= Sharia =

Islamic religious law

Sharia (/ʃəˈriːə/; Arabic: شَرِيعَة, romanized: šarīʿa, lit. 'path [to water]', IPA: [ʃaˈriːʕa]), also transliterated as Sharī'ah, Shari'a, Shariah—often referred to in the West as "Sharia Law"—is a body of religious law that forms the Islamic tradition based on scriptures of Islam, particularly the Qur'an and hadith.

In Islamic terms sharīʿah refers to immutable, intangible divine law, in contrast to fiqh (Islamic jurisprudence), which refers to its interpretations by Islamic scholars. Sharia, or fiqh as traditionally known, has always been used alongside customary law from the very beginning in Islamic history; it has been elaborated and developed over the centuries by legal opinions issued by qualified jurists – reflecting the tendencies of different schools – and integrated with various economic, penal and administrative laws issued by Muslim rulers; and implemented for centuries by judges in the courts until recent times, when secularism was widely adopted in Islamic societies.

Traditional theory of Islamic jurisprudence recognizes four sources for al-sharia: the Qur'an, sunnah (or authentic ahadith), ijma (lit. consensus) (may be understood as ijma al-ummah (Arabic: إجماع الأمة) – a whole Islamic community consensus, or ijma al-aimmah (Arabic: إجماع الائـمـة) – a consensus by religious authorities), and analogical reasoning. (Note: Twelver Shia jurisprudence does not recognize the use of qiyas, but relies on reason (ʿaql) in their place.)

It distinguishes two principal branches of law, rituals (Ibadah) and social dealings (Muamalat); subsections family law, relationships (commercial, political / administrative) and criminal law, in a wide range of topics assigning actions – capable of settling into different categories according to different understandings – to categories (ahkam) mainly as: mandatory, recommended, neutral, abhorred, and prohibited. Beyond legal norms, Sharia also enters many areas that are considered private practices today, such as belief, worshipping, ethics, clothing, and lifestyle, and gives to those in command duties to intervene and regulate them.

Over time with the necessities brought by sociological changes, on the basis of interpretative studies legal schools have emerged, reflecting the preferences of particular societies and governments, as well as Islamic scholars or imams on theoretical and practical applications of laws and regulations. Legal schools of Sunni Islam – Hanafi, Maliki, Shafiʽi, Hanbali, etc. – developed methodologies for deriving rulings from scriptural sources using a process known as ijtihad, a concept adopted by Shiism in much later periods meaning mental effort.

Although Sharia is presented in addition to its other aspects by the contemporary Islamist understanding, as a form of governance some researchers approach traditional sīrah narratives with skepticism, seeing the early history of Islam not as a period when Sharia was dominant, but a kind of "secular Arabic expansion" and dating the formation of Islamic identity to a much later period.

Approaches to Sharia in the 21st century vary widely, and the role and mutability of Sharia in a changing world has become an increasingly debated topic in Islam. Beyond sectarian differences, fundamentalists advocate the complete and uncompromising implementation of "exact/pure sharia" without modifications, while modernists argue that it can/should be brought into line with human rights and other contemporary issues such as democracy, minority rights, freedom of thought, women's rights, and banking by new jurisprudences. Several practices of Sharia have been deemed incompatible with human rights, gender equality, and freedom of speech and expression.

In Muslim majority countries, traditional laws have been widely used with or changed by European models. Judicial procedures and legal education have been brought in line with European practice likewise. While the constitutions of most Muslim-majority states contain references to Sharia, its rules are largely retained only in family law and penalties in some. The Islamic revival of the late 20th century brought calls by Islamic movements for full implementation of Sharia, including hudud corporal punishments, such as stoning.

== Terminology ==
The Arabic word شريعة (šarīʿa) derives from the root š-r-ʕ. In the Quran, شريعة (šarīʿa) and its cognate شرعة (širʿa) occur once each, with the meaning "way" or "path". This term was borrowed into Ottoman Turkish as شرع (şerʿ / şeriʿ), which then entered the English language as Sheri, a term that was used in late 19th- and early 20th-century law-related works, along with the French variant chéri.

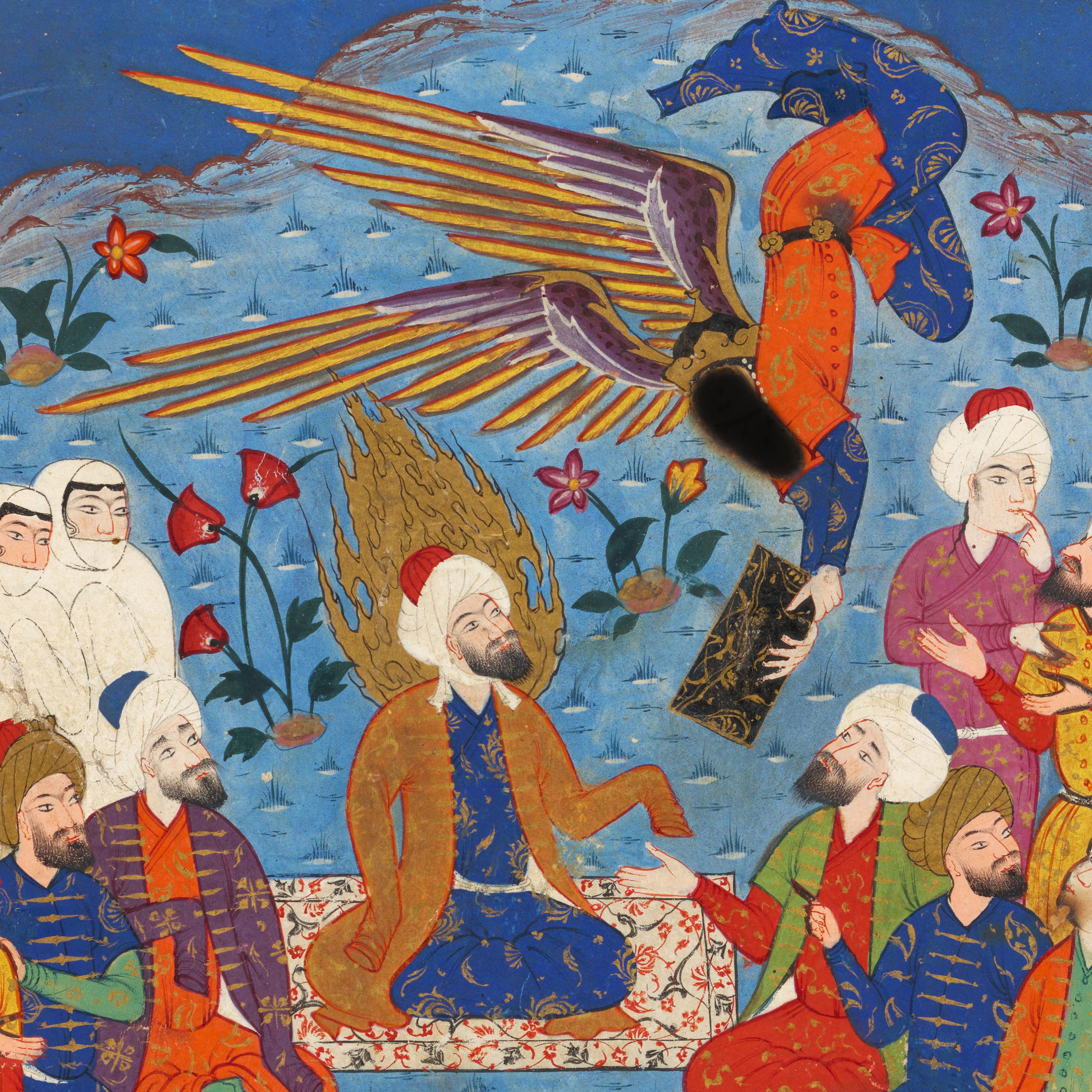
Musa receiving the Tawrat from Jibril. While sociology points out that terminology and narratives undergo evolutionary shifts across geographical and historical strata; the comparative method has revealed parallelism between the Jewish halakha —denoting divine laws— and the Islamic "sharia," regarding their "sources of legislation" and modes of interpretation. Both terms share a metaphor denoting a "path" or "way to follow". It is likely that the term "halakha" underwent a semantic shift, coming to denote "morality" (akhlaq) during the Islamic period, while the space it previously occupied was filled by "sharia."

According to lexicographical studies, this word and its derivatives —in texts reflecting a rural or nomadic setting— refer to the watering of animals at a permanent water source or along the seashore. Another area of usage is associated with the concepts of extension or length and is non-religious in nature. The word is cognate with the Hebrew saraʿ (Hebrew: שָׂרַע, lit. 'lady') and is likely to be the origin of the meaning "way" or "path".

The word شريعة (šarīʿa) was widely used by Arabic-speaking Jews during the Middle Ages, being the most common translation for the word Torah in the 10th-century Arabic translation of the Torah by Saadia Gaon. A similar use of the term can be found in Christian writers. The Arabic expression Sharīʿat Allāh (شريعة الله 'God's Law') is a common translation of Torat Elokim (תורת אלוהים, 'Teaching [of] God') and νόμος τοῦ θεοῦ ('God's Law' in Greek in the New Testament [Rom. 7: 22]).

=== Contemporary usage ===
In everyday usage and the language of sermons, the terminological and semantic distinction of the word is disregarded; instead, it is used interchangeably with —and as a substitute for— the concept of Dīn, which encompasses areas such as belief, morality, and custom. For example, شريعة موسى (šarīʿat mūsā) means "law" or "religion of Moses" and شريعتنا (šarīʿatunā) can mean "our religion" in reference to any monotheistic faith. Within Islamic discourse, شريعة (šarīʿa) refers to religious -strict- regulations governing the lives of Muslims. For many Muslims, the word means simply "justice," and they will consider any law that promotes justice and social welfare to conform to Sharia.

A related term al-qānūn al-islāmī (القانون الإسلامي, Islamic law), which was borrowed from European usage in the late 19th century, is used in the Muslim world to refer to a legal system in the context of a modern state. Mehmet Görmez draws a distinction between the concepts of shar'i (derived from Sharia) and mashru' (lit. approved by Sharia, legal); he states that not every ruling based on the sources of Sharia (nass) can be accepted as mashru' —a term he interprets as implying conformity with the principle of justice.

== Theories of origin and roots ==
According to the traditionalist (Atharī) Islamic perspective, the fundamental Principles of Islamic jurisprudence and Sharia are traced back to Muhammad through the Companions, who adopted his actions and approvals as a model (Sunnah) and transmitted this knowledge to subsequent generations in the form of hadith. These narrations paved the way first for informal discussions and later for systematic legal thought; this framework was most authoritatively articulated during the eighth and ninth centuries by the great jurists Abu Hanifa, Malik ibn Anas, al-Shafi‘i, and Ahmad ibn Hanbal —recognized as the founders of the Hanafi, Maliki, Shafi‘i, and Hanbali schools of Sunni jurisprudence.

Although modern historians initially accepted the general outlines of the traditionalist narrative, some have proposed new theories regarding the formation of 'fiqh', because Sharia laws did not possess the shallowness or inadequacy that would stem from the daily life practices of a rural tribal society numbering only a few thousand people.

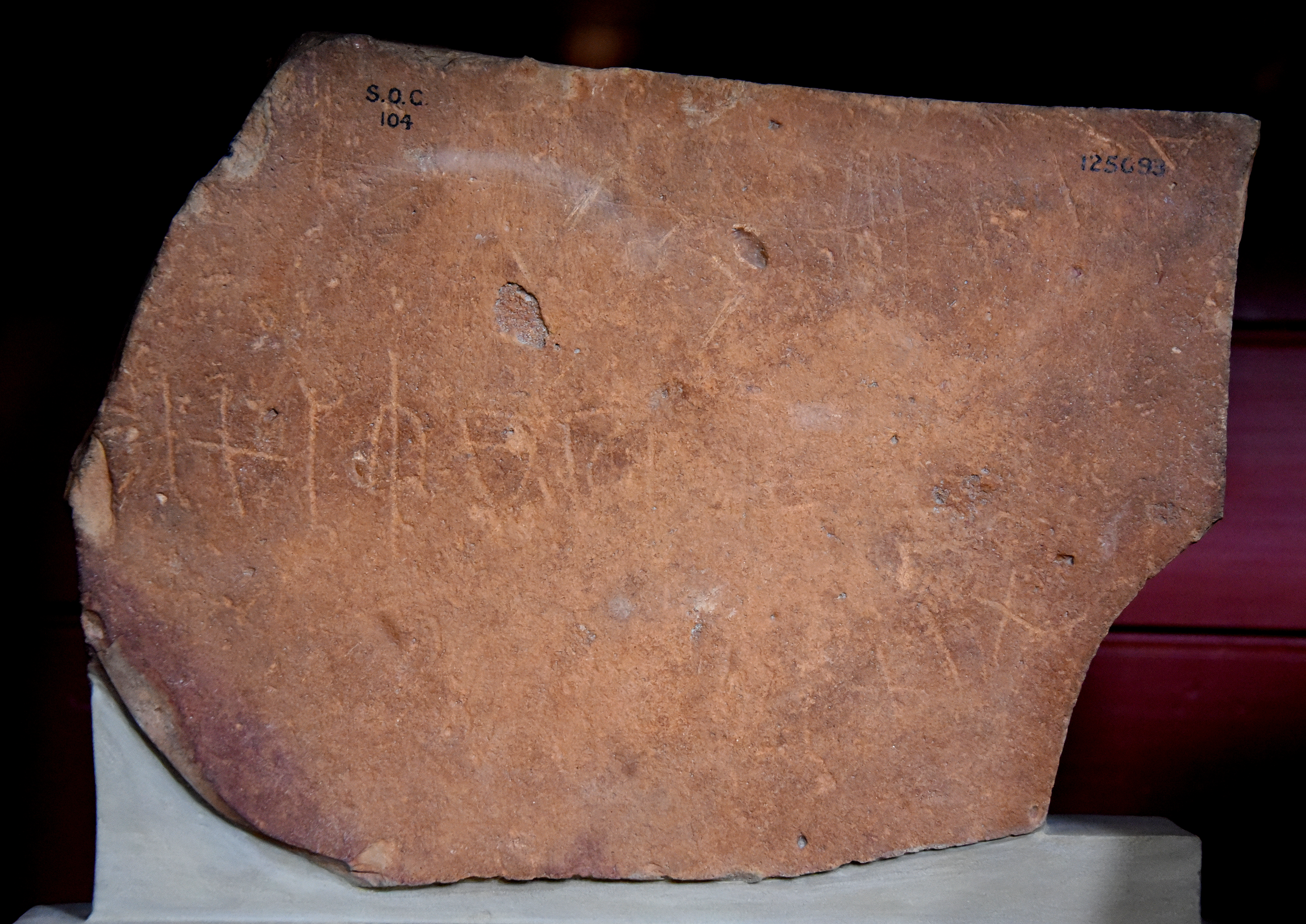
Safaitic script with a figure of a camel on a red sandstone fragment, from es-Safa, currently housed in the British Museum

Research has shown that, as is the case with Islamic belief system, certain elements that can be considered precursors to Sharia law and rituals —spanning a wide spectrum from acts of worship to civil mu'amalat and penal law— can be observed in neighboring Middle Eastern cultures and pre-Islamic Arab religions, some examples include the following; Pilgrimage is mentioned in pre-Islamic Safaitic-Arabic inscriptions, and continuity can be observed in certain details, especially in today's hajj and umrah rituals. The veiling order, which distinguishes between slaves and free women in Islam, also coincides with similar distinctions seen in pre-Islamic civilizations. Qisas was a practice used as a resolution tool in inter-tribal conflicts in pre-Islamic Arab society. The basis of this resolution was that a member from the tribe to which the murderer belonged was handed over to the victim's family for execution, equivalent to the social status of the murdered person.

The "condition of social equivalence" meant the execution of a member of the murderer's tribe who was equivalent to the murdered person. For example, only a slave could be killed for a slave, and a woman for a woman. In other cases, compensatory payment (Diya) could be paid to the family of the murdered. On top of this pre-Islamic understanding, a debate was added whether a Muslim can be executed for a non-Muslim during the Islamic period. The foundational verse for the Islamic rule of retaliation is Al Baqara (2:178): “O believers! Retaliation is prescribed for you in cases of murder: a free man for a free man, a slave for a slave, and a female for a female. But if the offender is pardoned by the victim’s guardian, then blood-money should be decided fairly and payment made courteously...”

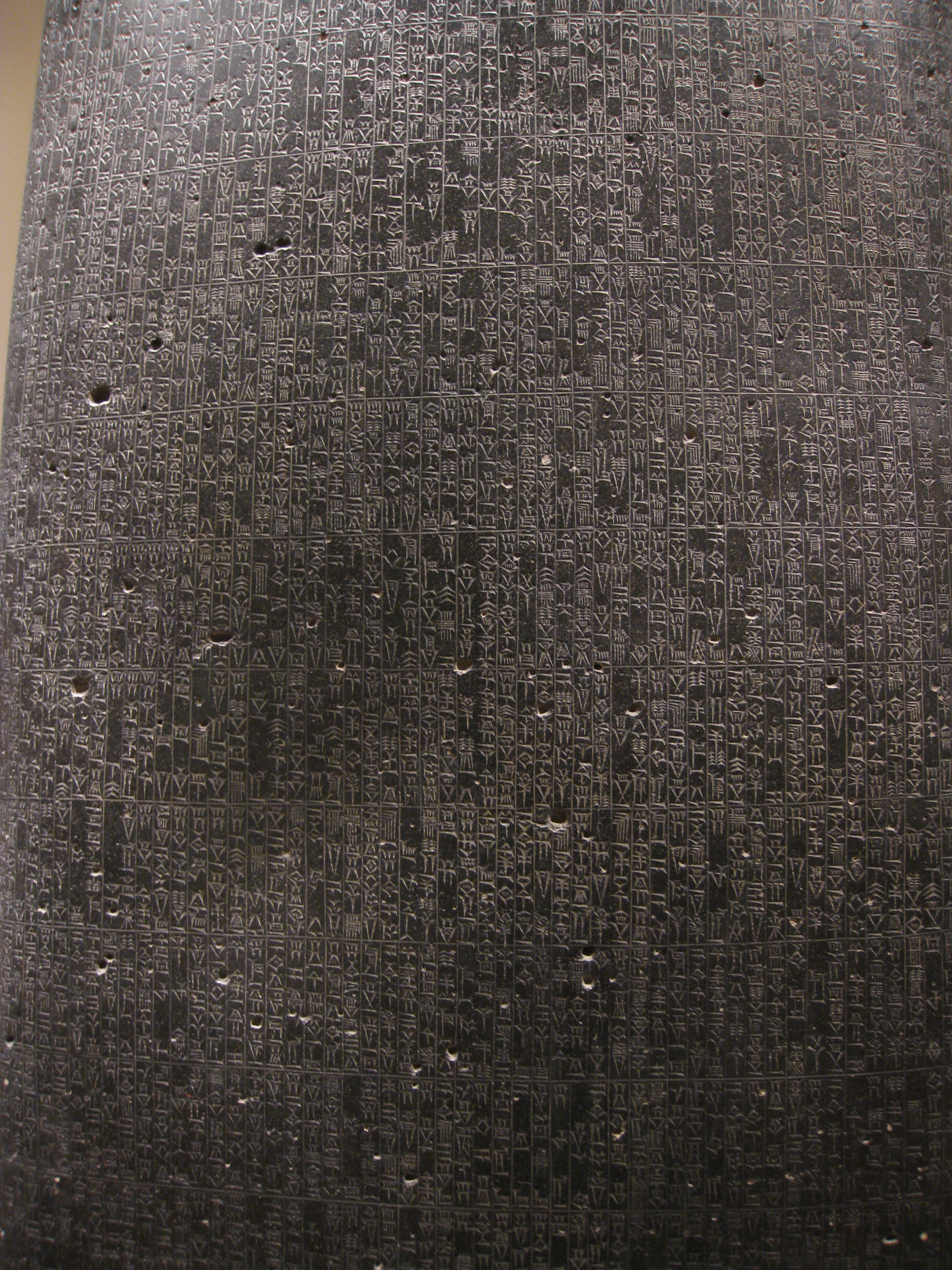
In the laws of Hammurabi, an eye for an eye was applied if a free man (avīlum) gouged out the eye/broke the bone of another free man of equal status; otherwise, a monetary penalty was paid.

A novel and compelling perspective —proposed by Ignác Goldziher in the late 19th century and elaborated upon by Joseph Schacht in the mid-20th century— sheds light on two key phenomenon in early Islamic history: the transformation of urf (custom) —which originally held a primary role in lawmaking alongside caliphal decrees and legal opinions (ra’y)— into Sunnah (a conceptual shift); and the infiltration of hadith into the later legal framework with a dominant role, despite their initially negligible role in legislation. This explanation, which refers to backward projection, also contained clues —alongside others— as to how the hadiths could be so comprehensive.

According to this view, the customs and traditions of populations in territories acquired through early conquests, as well as the legal and administrative legacies of the preceding Byzantine, Sasanian, Umayyad etc eras, were attributed to Muhammad via chains of transmission (isnad); this secured the social legitimacy required for the new legal paradigm, the theoretical foundations of which were established by al-Shafi‘i. (Note: "...the essential features of old Muhammadan jurisprudence, such as the idea of the 'living tradition' of the ancient schools of law [local practices of early Muslim communities]; a body of common doctrine expressing the earliest effort to systematize; legal maxims which often reflect a slightly later stage, and an important nucleus of legal traditions... it is safe to say that [this] Muhammadan legal science started in the later part of the Umaiyad period, taking the legal practice of the time as its raw material and endorsing, modifying, or rejecting it") (Note: Islamic "law did not derive directly from the Koran but developed... out of popular and administrative practices under the Umayyads, and this practice often diverged from the intentions and even the explicit wording of the Koran... Norms derived from the Koran were introduced into Muhammadan law almost invariably at a secondary stage") (Note: "In the time of Shafi'i, traditions from the Prophet were already recognized as one of the material bases of Muhammadan law. Their position in the ancient schools of law was, as we have seen, much less certain." Another example is that an early major works of fiqh—Muwatta Imam Malik (edited by Shaibani)—contains 429 ahadith by Muhammad but 750 by the Companions, Successors and others, in contrast to later works by al-Bukhari, Muslim, etc. that contain only ahadith by Muhammad.) (Note: "...a great many traditions in the classical and other collections were put into circulation only after Shafi'i's time; the first considerable body of legal traditions from the Prophet originated towards the middle of the second century...") In his view, the real architect of Islamic jurisprudence was al-Shafi'i, who formulated this idea (that legal norms must be formally grounded in scriptural sources) and other elements of classical legal theory in his work al-risala.

Some historians have sought a middle ground: Early Islamic law emerged from a combination of administrative and community-based practices in the conquered territories and shaped by the religious and ethical principles of Islam. While retaining certain aspects of pre-Islamic laws and customs —and modifying others— this legal system aimed to establish norms of Islamic conduct and resolving disputes arising within the community. This was a gradual process of development —taking place within the cultural and political context of the era and region— amidst retrospective constructs and traditions that reflected the understandings and solutions of the social fabric; it unfolded in circles of learning where students and aspiring scholars gathered to acquire knowledge from a local master and deliberate on religious matters—circles that would later come to be known as schools of law.

== Sociology ==
Fiqh is traditionally divided into the fields of uṣūl al-fiqh (lit. the roots of fiqh), which studies the theoretical principles of jurisprudence, and furūʿ al-fiqh (lit. the branches of fiqh), which is devoted to elaboration of rulings on the basis of these principles.

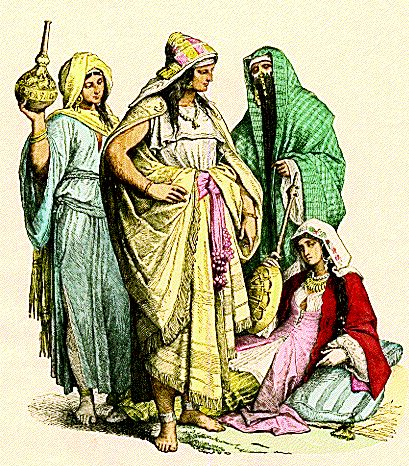
Early costumes of free, Arab women; philological research indicates that concepts such as "Ma'ruf" and "munkar" -which appear as frequently recurring mottos in the Quran— underwent a process of "Islamization." While "maʿruf " and "munkar" originally signified behaviors that were socially accepted or rejected across various historical contexts and geographical regions ie variable Urf, the terms would come to denote behaviors approved or rejected by Islamic jurists, fairly constant norms, ahkam

The initial confrontations with the normative, text- and tradition-centered approaches of Sharia proponents and the authority of the ulama began at an intellectual level with rationalists and philosophers over issues such as the definition of good and evil. While some jurists continued to impose strict rules on society —claiming they were "required by Sharia"— within the framework of their own methodologies, another group, unable to directly oppose Sharia or these rules, authored books on Ḥiyal (legal stratagems), that demonstrated Sharia-compliant ways to circumvent the established regulations. Esoteric and certain —marginal— Sufi movements viewed the exoteric (outward) form of religion and jurisprudential rules not as an ultimate goal, but rather as a transitional stage on the path to the Truth — a stage that was no longer strictly binding upon them. (Note: Sharia is the first of Four Doors and the lowest level on the path to God in Sufism and in branches of Islam that are influenced by Sufism, such as Ismailism and Alawism. It is necessary to reach from Sharia to Tariqa, from there to Ma'rifa and finally to haqiqa. In each of these gates, there are 10 levels that the dervish must pass through.) However, for the ruling religious-political elites, this situation served as a necessary rhetorical tool and an instrument of power for consolidating the masses (the awâm), maintaining social order, and ensuring the continuity of their rule. Preachers, meanwhile, recounted fabricated accounts of Muhammad’s journey to Hell and hagiographic tales attributed to the Companions and saints, all to emphasize the terrible fate awaiting those who abandoned rules and norms.

While uprisings of varying scales throughout history have challenged the implementation of Sharia —or the manner of its application— at different levels of intensity, some rebellions were driven by the argument that Sharia was not being implemented sufficiently or correctly. Fueled by historical defeat against the West, domestic authoritarianism, and systemic injustice, contemporary Islamist movements strive to impose an all-encompassing Sharia order modeled on a pristine 'Age of Bliss.' They operate along a spectrum that ranges from manufacturing consent through grass-roots social services to asserting control via political violence and terrorism. Sharia proponents are not obliged to speak the truth in every situation, as general Islamic ethics would recommend; they have the right to conceal their identity and resort to taqiyya in certain circumstances. Jan Michiel Otto summarizes the different meanings that can be attributed to this term in current literature and discourse. Some researchers point to the profound changes Sharia has undergone from the time of Muhammad and the early caliphs —which themselves may have been shaped by retrospective attributions— to the present day.

- Divine, abstract sharia: In this sense, Sharia is a rather abstract concept which leaves ample room for various interpretations.
- Classical sharia: The body of Islamic rules, principles and Ijtihād cases compiled by religious scholars during the first two centuries after Muhammad.
- Historical sharia(s): Includes the entire body of all principles, rules, cases and interpretations developed and transmitted throughout a history of more than one thousand years across the entire Muslim world, since the closing of the gate of free interpretation up to the present.
- Contemporary sharia(s): Contains the full spectrum of principles, rules, cases and interpretations developed and applied at present that migration, modernisation, information and communication have decreased the dominance of the legal schools on understanding. (See:Codification)

== Establishment / Classical period ==
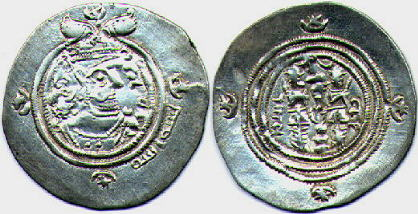
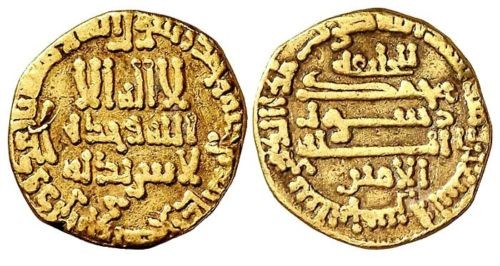
Coins of the Rashidun Caliphate (left), which feature the addition of the brief Arabic phrase Bism-Allah alongside the imagery on Sasanian coins, as well metal coins surviving from the Abbasids (right), reflect the history of the transition toward an approach in Islamic thought that strongly condemned foreign religious symbols and imagery.

Sharia literature operates through a sequence of objectives, sources, and instruments that often have fluid, overlapping relationships with one another; an objective may be viewed as a source or an instrument, and an instrument as a source. Classical jurisprudence has been described as "one of the major intellectual achievements of Islam" and its importance in Islam has been compared to that of theology in Christianity. (Note: "What theology is for the Christian, law is for the Muslim." referenced in)

Nevertheless, confusion persists —even today —regarding fundamental issues that pave the way for state intervention in the daily lives of individuals, such as the definition or classification of beliefs and attitudes, as legal matters —encompassing muamelat (social and civil transactions) and ukubat (penal provisions)— that entail responsibility against laws; and attittudes regarding faith, worship, ethics, clothing etc. a matter of counsel, but cannot be a subject of law or punishment.

=== Epistemological framework (Methodology, uṣūl al-fiqh) ===
Classical Islamic jurisprudence refers how to elaborate and interpret religious sources that are considered reliable within the framework of "procedural principles" within its context such as linguistic and "rhetorical tools" to derive judgments for new situations by taking into account certain purposes and mesalih. Textual phrases usually dealt with under simple antithetical headings: general and particular, command and prohibition, obscure and clear, truth and metaphor. It also comprises methods for establishing authenticity of hadith and for determining when the legal force of a scriptural passage is abrogated by a passage revealed at a later date.

The sources of judgment in classical fiqh are roughly divided into two: Manqūlāt (transmitted sources; Quran and hadith) and Aqliyyāt (rational sources; ijma, qiyas, ijtihad and others). Some of them (Aqliyyāt) are considered to be the product of scholastic theology and Aristotelian logic. It was an important area of debate among traditional fiqh scholars how much space should be given to rational methods in creating provisions such as extracting provisions from religious texts, as well as expanding, restricting, abolishing or postponing these provisions according to new situations, considering the purpose and benefit, together with new sociologies, in the face of changing conditions.

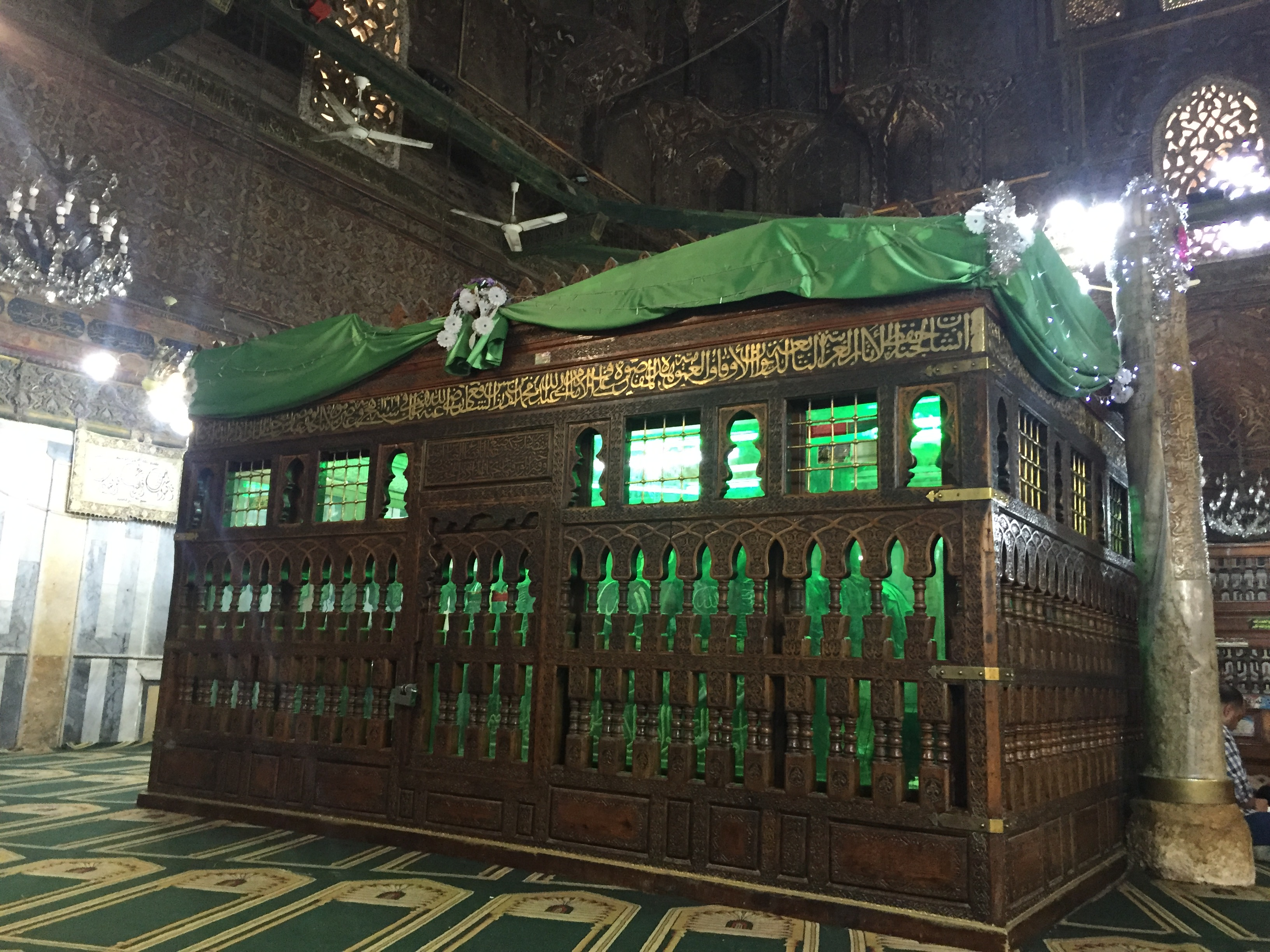
Imam Shafi'i tomb in Cairo, died 820 CE/204 AH, writer of Al-Risala on principles of jurisprudence

In this context, in the Classical period, the ulema were divided into groups (among other divisions such as political divisions) regarding the place of "'Aql" vis-à-vis naql: those who rely on narration (Atharists, Ahl al-Hadith), those who rely on reason (Ahl al-Kalām, Mu'tazila and Ahl al-Ra'y) and those who tried to find a middle way between the two attitudes such as Abu al-Hasan al-Ash'ari in theology (syncretists). In the classical age of Islam, there were violent conflicts between rationalists (aqliyyun; al-muʿtazila, kalamiyya) and traditionalist (naqliyyun, literalists, Ahl al-Hadith) groups and sects regarding the Quran and hadith or the place of reason in understanding the Quran and hadith, as can be seen in the Mihna example. Although the rationalists initially seemed to gain the upper hand in this conflict, with the rise of literalism, the Mutazila sank into history and literalism continued to live by gaining supporters.

The formulation of the Sunni view on topic can be summarized as follows; Human reason is a gift from God which should be exercised to its fullest capacity. However, use of reason alone is insufficient to distinguish right from wrong, and rational argumentation must draw its content from the body of transcendental knowledge revealed in the Quran and through the sunnah of Muhammad. In addition to the Quran and sunnah, the classical theory of Sunni fiqh recognizes two other sources of law: juristic consensus (ijmaʿ) and analogical reasoning (qiyas). It therefore studies the application and limits of analogy, as well as the value and limits of consensus, along with other methodological principles, some of which are accepted by only certain legal schools. This interpretive apparatus is brought together under the rubric of ijtihad, which refers to a jurist's exertion in an attempt to arrive at a ruling on a particular question.

The theory of Twelver Shia jurisprudence parallels that of Sunni schools with some differences, such as recognition of reason (ʿaql) as a source of law in place of qiyas and extension of the notion of sunnah to include traditions of the imams.

==== Aims of Sharia and public interest ====
Maqāṣid (aims or purposes) of Sharia and maṣlaḥa (welfare or public interest) are two related classical doctrines which have come to play an increasingly prominent role in modern times. Abū Hāmid al-Ghazālī, Izz al-Din ibn 'Abd al-Salam and Abu Ishaq al-Shatibi used maslaha and madasıd as equivalent terms. Synonyms for the term maqāṣid aš-šarīʿa are the expressions maqāṣid aš-šāriʿ ("intentions of the legislature"), maqāṣid at-tašrīʿ ("intentions of the legislature "), ruḥ aš -šarīʿa ("Spirit of Sharia"), ḥikmat at-tašrīʿ ("Wisdom of Legislation") and falsafat at-tašrīʿ ("Philosophy of Legislation").

They were first clearly articulated by al-Ghazali (d. 1111), who argued that Maqāṣid and maslaha was God's general purpose in revealing the divine law, and that its specific aim was preservation of five essentials of human well-being: religion, life, intellect, offspring, and property.

Although most classical-era jurists recognized maslaha and maqasid as important legal principles, they held different views regarding the role they should play in Islamic law. Some jurists viewed them as auxiliary rationales constrained by scriptural sources and analogical reasoning. Others regarded them as an "independent" source of law, whose general principles could override specific inferences based on the letter of scripture. Taking maqasid and maslaha as an "independent" source of sharia – rather than an auxiliary one – will pave the way for the re-critique and reorganization of ahkam in the context of maqasid and maslaha, thus (including hudud), which is often criticized in terms of today's values and seen as problematic, in terms of the purposes of Sharia and social benefits will be replaced by new ones. Abdallah bin Bayyah goes further with an approach that prioritizes purpose and benefit among the sources of Sharia and declares it to be the heart of "usul-al fiqh".

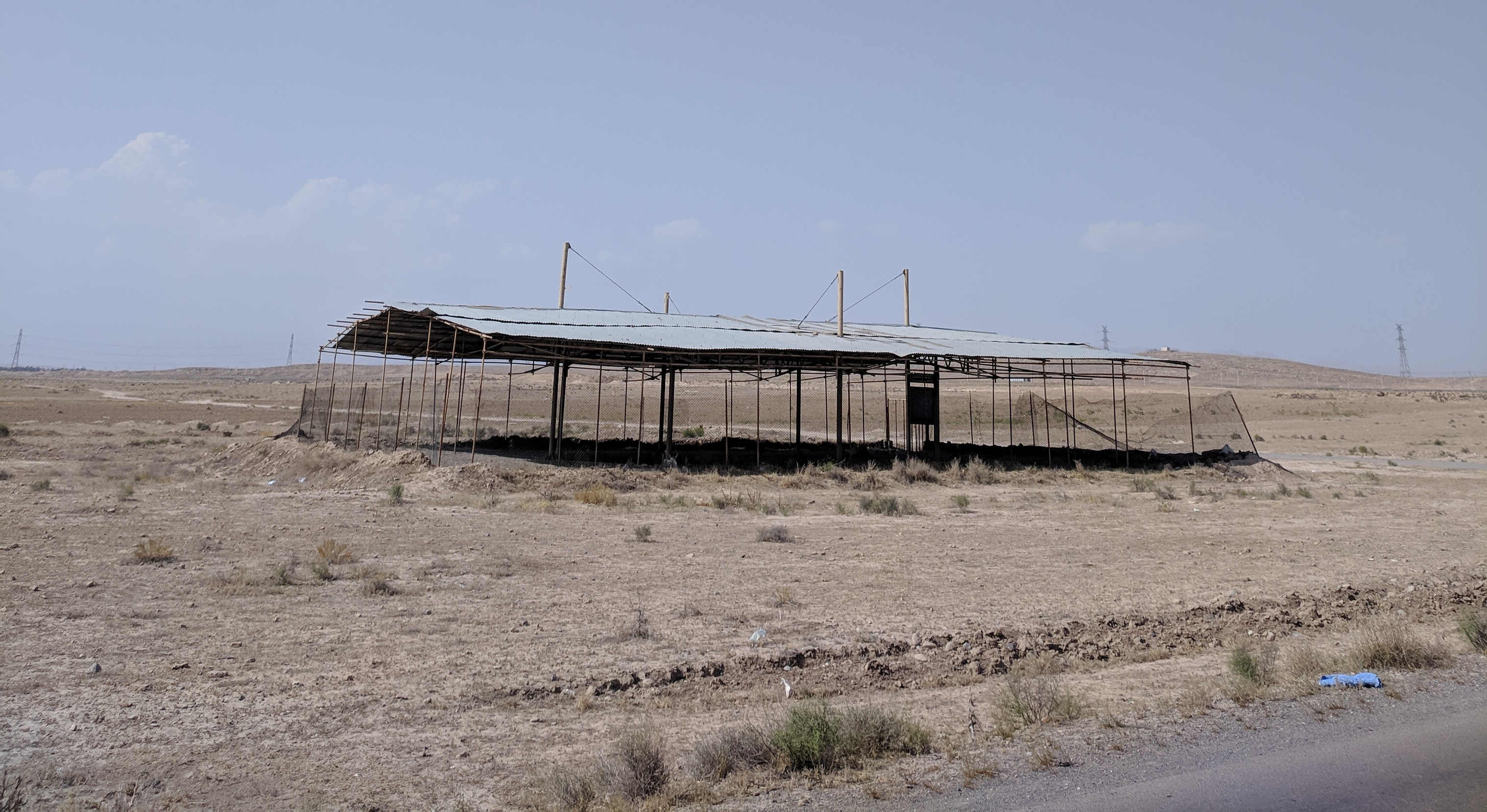
Mausoleum of Al-Ghazali in Tus; Many see Al-Ghazali as the last mujtahid, and his period as the period when the door of ijtihad closed and, in a sense, the Islamic Middle Ages began, and they think that Ghazali is responsible for this.

While the latter view was held by a minority of classical jurists, in modern times it came to be championed in different forms by prominent scholars who sought to adapt Islamic law to changing social conditions by drawing on the intellectual heritage of traditional jurisprudence. These scholars expanded the inventory of maqasid to include such aims of Sharia as reform and women's rights (Rashid Rida); justice and freedom (Mohammed al-Ghazali); and human rights and dignity (Yusuf al-Qaradawi).

==== Sources ====
Various sources of Islamic Laws are used by Islamic jurisprudence to elaborate the body of Islamic law, which are called Masdar (مصادر) or Dalil (دليل). Islamic scholar Rashid Rida (1865–1935 CE) lists the four basic sources of Islamic law, agreed upon by all Sunni Muslims: "the [well-known] sources of legislation in Islam are four: the Qur'an, the Sunnah, the consensus of the ummah and ijtihad undertaken by competent jurists". While traditional understanding strongly denies that Quran may have changed,(Al Hejr:9) the authenticity of hadiths could only be questioned through the chain of narration, though some western researchers suggests that primary sources may have also been evolved.

- Quran: in Islam, the Quran is considered to be the most sacred source of law. According to classical mainstream jurists, the verses of the Quran that were "revealed later" in Islamic language may have restricted or abolished the earlier verses. Therefore, deciding which verses of the Quran will be used, in addition to other knowledge and skills, may be the job of lawyers who know these issues in detail. Whether the Sunnah could limit the Quran remained a matter of debate. Fiqh sects are schools of understanding that try to determine the actions that people should do or avoid based on the Quran and hadiths. Hanafi sect requires that in order for something to be considered fard, it must be clearly commanded in the Qur'an "according to logical and grammatical requirements such as addressee, order and scope, etc.", expressions that do not meet this condition are placed in the "wujub" class, which expresses a lower level of necessity. Some of these fiqh results (ahkam) may also indicate exaggeration of statements, generalizations taken out of context, and imperative broadening of scope.

A small number of verses in the Quran are about general rules of governance, inheritance, marriage, crime and punishment. There are notable exceptions to some of these rules, as in Al-Ahzab 49; jurists state that they are specific to Muhammad alone. Although the Quran does not impose a specific legal-management system, it emphasizes custom in nearly 40 verses and commands justice. (An-Nahl; 90) The practices prescribed in the Quran are considered as reflections of contextual legal understandings, as can be clearly seen in some examples such as Qisas and diya.

The following statement in the Quran is thought to be the general rule of testimony in Islamic jurisprudence, except for crime and punishment – for example, debt, shopping, etc.; O believers! When you contract a loan for a fixed period of time, commit it to writing....with justice. Call upon two of your men to witness. If two men cannot be found, then one man and two women of your choice will witness so if one of the women forgets the other may remind her.... Rules of inheritance was also mentioned in the Quran, in regards to certain family members having their share..^{[Quran 4:11]}

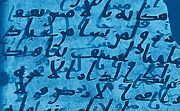
A page from the Sanaa manuscript. According to the Quranists, it was the only reliable source of religion, preserved from corruption. However, certain Quranic studies have led to the proposal of theses that radically alter the traditional narrative regarding its origins, development, and canonization. (Note: According to some researchers like John Wansbrough and Yehuda D. Nevo, later known as the Revisionist school of Islamic studies, the canonization of the Quran, through the unification of "various previous texts" into a single, unchanging standard text and the elimination of others, took place over a period of approximately 200 years. They argued that a common method within Islamic tradition was to legitimize a practice by attributing it to a past authority that enjoyed high popular acceptance. This suggests that the accounts of Uthman's cancellation and burning of the codices may actually refer to a single issue encompassing different codices. While variant readings were initially scorned and criticized as human creations, five centuries later these readings were sanctified by being linked to a divine source.)

In a different example, in the necklace story of Aisha, called Asbab al-Nuzul for surah An-Nur :11-20 four witnesses were required for the accusation of adultery. In addition, those who made accusations that did not meet the specified conditions would be punished with 80 lashes. The jurisprudence of later periods stipulates that witnesses must be men, covering all hadd crimes and people who did not have credibility and honesty in society (slaves, non-adl; sinners, infidels) could not testify against believers. In addition, the Islamic judiciary did not require proof of the issues defined as tazir. The statement in the Qur'an that determines the status of slaves in community is; ma malakat aymanuhum meaning "those whom your right hands possess".

Of the few criminal cases listed as crimes in the Quran, only a few of them are punished by the classical books of Sharia as determined by the verses of the Quran and are called hudud laws. How the verse Al-Ma'idah 33, which describes the crime of hirabah, should be understood is a matter of debate even today. The verse talks about the punishment of criminals by killing, hanging, having their hands and feet cut off on opposite sides, and being exiled from the earth, in response to an -abstract- crime such as "fighting against Allah and His Messenger". Today, commentators – in the face of the development of the understanding of law and the increasing reactions to corporal punishment – claim that the verse determines the punishment of "concrete sequential criminal acts" – such as massacre, robbery and rape – in addition to rebellion against the legitimate government, and that the punishment to be given depends on the existence of these preconditions.

- Sunnah / Hadith: Although hadiths have largely replaced the sunnah in orthodoxy legislation today, according to some research, the opposite was true in the early Islamic society. Sunnah originally meant a tradition that did not contain the definition of good and bad. Later, "good traditions" (Ma'ruf) began to be referred to as sunnah and the concept of "Muhammad's sunnah" was established. Muhammad's sunnah gave way to the "hadiths of Muhammad" which were transmitted orally, then recorded in corpuses and systematized and purified within following centuries. According to Harald Motzki and Daniel W. Brown the earliest Islamic legal reasonings that have come down to us were "virtually hadith-free", but gradually, over the course of second century A.H. "the infiltration and incorporation of Prophetic hadiths into Islamic jurisprudence" took place. The value of customs (see also: urf, ma'ruf) manifests itself in the classification of food and drinks as halal and haram; Some jurists such as Al- Shafi'i and Ibn Qudamah have determined the haram/halal criterion as "compatibility or contradiction with the Arab's customary habits and nature".

Although for many Muslim sects, hadith was second to the Quran in authority, the majority of Sharia rules were derived from hadith rather than the Quran. (Note: "The full systems of Islamic theology and law are not derived primarily from the Quran. Muhammad's sunna was a second but far more detailed living scripture, and later Muslim scholars would thus often refer to Muhammad as 'The Possessor of Two Revelations'".) The body of hadith provides more detailed and practical legal guidance, but it was recognized early on that not all of them were authentic. Hadith compilations were developed along divergent lines influenced by distinct cultural spheres where each sect established over time its own accredited corpus, and shaped by the presuppositions of religio-political divisions such as Sunni, Shia, and Kharijite; this situation, which compromised reliability, subsequently paved the way for scholars of hadith to establish specific criteria for verifying the authenticity of these narrations.

Later Islamic scholars developed various personal criteria for evaluating their authenticity by assessing the trustworthiness of the individuals listed in their transmission chains. These studies narrowed down the vast corpus of prophetic traditions to several thousand "sound (seeming to collectors)" hadiths, which were collected in several sect-specific canonical compilations. The hadiths which enjoyed concurrent transmission were deemed mutawatir; however, the vast majority of hadiths were handed down by only one or a few transmitters and were therefore seen to yield only probable knowledge. The uncertainty was further compounded by the ambiguity of the language contained in some hadiths and Quranic passages.

In Imam Malik's usage, hadith did not consist only of the words claimed to belong to Muhammad as is the case with Shiite Muslims. While hadith does not appear to be an important source of decision for early fiqh scholars such as Abu Hanifa, for later scholars, hadith is perceived as the words of Muhammad merely and is considered as a strong and separate source of decision alongside the Quran. Today, Quranists do not consider hadiths as a valid source of religious rulings.

- Ijma: it is the consensus that could in principle elevate a ruling based on probable evidence to absolute certainty. This classical doctrine drew its authority from a series of hadiths stating that the Islamic community could never agree on an error. This form of consensus was technically defined as agreement of all competent jurists in any particular generation, acting as representatives of the community. However, the practical difficulty of obtaining and ascertaining such an agreement meant that it had little impact on legal development. A more pragmatic form of consensus, which could be determined by consulting works of prominent jurists, was used to confirm a ruling so that it could not be reopened for further discussion. The cases for which there was a consensus account form less than 1 percent of the body of classical jurisprudence.
- Qiyas: it is the Analogical reasoning that is used to derive a ruling for a situation not addressed in the scripture by analogy with a scripturally based rule. In a classic example, the Quranic prohibition of drinking wine is extended to all intoxicating substances, on the basis of the "cause" (ʿilla) shared by these situations, which in this case is identified to be intoxication. Since the cause of a rule may not be apparent, its selection commonly occasioned controversy and extensive debate. Majority of Sunni Muslims view Qiyas as a central Pillar of Ijtihad. On the other hand; Zahirites, Ahmad ibn Hanbal, Al-Bukhari, early Hanbalites, etc rejected Qiyas amongst the Sunnis. Twelver Shia jurisprudence also does not recognize the use of qiyas, but relies on reason (ʿ'aql) in its place.

==== Intellectual exertion ====
Ijtihad lit. 'physical' or 'mental effort' refers to independent reasoning by an expert in Islamic law, or exertion of a jurist's mentality in finding a solution to a legal question in contrast with taqlid (conformity to precedent ijtihad). According to theory, ijtihad requires expertise in the Arabic language, theology, religious texts, and principles of jurisprudence (usul al-fiqh), and is not employed where authentic and trusted texts (Qur'an and hadith) are considered unambiguous with regard to the question, or where there is an existing scholarly consensus (ijma). An Islamic scholar who perform ijtihad is called "mujtahid". In the general understanding, beyond the limitation of ijtihad to those situations that do not have a clear ruling in the Quran and hadiths, scholars who have the ability to give general judgments are also ranked with definitions such as "mujtahid mutlaq", "mujtahid in sect", "mujtahid in issue". Rulings based on ijtihad are not decisions that require obligatory implementation for other Muslims.

Throughout the first five Islamic centuries, ijtihad continued to practise amongst Sunni Muslims. The controversy surrounding ijtihad started with the beginning of the twelfth century. By the 14th century, Islamic Fiqh prompted leading Sunni jurists to state that the main legal questions had been addressed and then ijtihad was gradually restricted. In the modern era, this gave rise to a perception amongst Orientalist scholars and sections of the Muslim public that the so-called "gate of ijtihad" was closed at the start of the classical era.

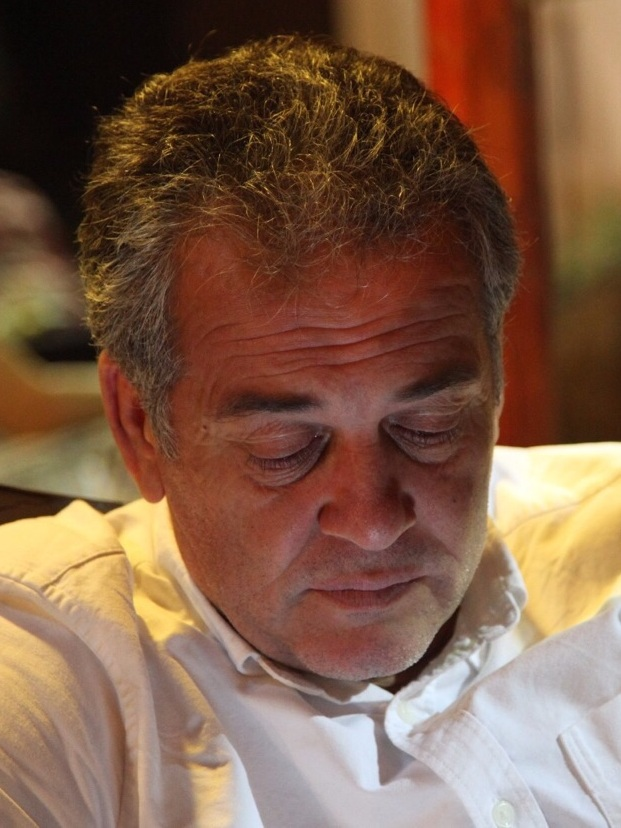
Mustafa Öztürk follows Fazlur Rahman Malik's footsteps and says that the verses are revealed on the historical context, the Ahkam are not among the essence and purposes of religion, with an example: Slaves were considered property; could be bought, sold, rented and shared. Pointing to a ruling by Al-Sarakhsi —who suggested that the issue of determining the lineage of a child born under such circumstances could be resolved by drawing lots— Öztürk asks: "How many of you today could accept such an understanding?"

Starting from the 18th century, Islamic reformers began calling for abandonment of taqlid and emphasis on ijtihad, which they saw as a return to Islamic origins. The advocacy of ijtihad has been particularly associated with Islamic Modernism and Salafiyya movements. Among contemporary Muslims in the West there have emerged new visions of ijtihad which emphasize substantive moral values over traditional juridical understandings.

Shia jurists did not use the term ijtihad until the 12th century. With the exception of Zaydis, the early Imami Shia were unanimous in censuring Ijtihad in the field of law (Ahkam) until the Shiite embrace of various doctrines of Mu'tazila and classical Sunnite Fiqh. After the victory of the Usulis who based law on principles (usul) over the Akhbaris ("traditionalists") who emphasized reports or traditions (khabar) by the 19th century, Ijtihad would become a mainstream Shia practice.

The classical process of ijtihad combined these generally recognized principles with other methods, which were not adopted by all legal schools, such as istihsan (juristic preference), istislah (consideration of public interest) and istishab (presumption of continuity).

Considering that, as a rule, there was a hierarchy and power ranking among the sources of Sharia; for example, a subcategory or an auxiliary source will not be able to eliminate a provision clearly stated in the main source or prohibit a practice that was not prohibited though it was known and practiced during the prophetic period. If we look at an example such as the abolition of the validity of Mut'a marriage, is touched upon in the Quran 4:24, and not prohibited (Sunnis translate the words used in the relevant verse with terms used to describe the ordinary marriage event) according to Sunnis is banned by Muhammad towards the end of his lifetime, and according to Shiites, by Omar, "according to his own opinion" and relying on power. The Shiite sect did not accept the jurisprudence of Omar, whose political and religious authority they rejected from the beginning.

==== Typifications; classes and labels ====
Fiqh is concerned with ethical standards as much as with legal norms, seeking to establish not only what is and is not legal, but also what is morally right and wrong. Sharia rulings fall into one of five categories known as "the five decisions" (al-aḥkām al-khamsa): mandatory (farḍ or wājib), recommended (mandūb or mustaḥabb), neutral (mubāḥ), reprehensible (makrūh), and forbidden (ḥarām).

It is a sin or a crime to perform a forbidden action or not to perform a mandatory action. Reprehensible acts should be avoided, but they are not considered to be sinful or punishable in court. Avoiding reprehensible acts and performing recommended acts is held to be subject of reward in the afterlife, while neutral actions entail no judgment from God. Jurists disagree on whether the term ḥalāl covers the first three or the first four categories. The legal and moral verdict depends on whether the action is committed out of necessity (ḍarūra) and on the underlying intention (niyya), as expressed in the legal maxim "acts are [evaluated according] to intention."

Hanafi fiqh does not consider both terms as synonymous and makes a distinction between "fard" and "wajib"; In Hanafi fiqh, two conditions are required to impose the fard rule. 1. Nass, (only verses of the Qur'an can be accepted as evidence here, not hadiths) 2.The expression of the text referring to the subject must be clear and precise enough not to allow other interpretations. The term wajib is used for situations that do not meet the second of these conditions. However, this understanding may not be sufficient to explain every situation.

For example, Hanafis accept 5 daily prayers as fard. However, some religious groups such as Quranists and Shiites, who do not doubt that the Quran existing today is a religious source, infer from the same verses that it is clearly ordered to pray 2 or 3 times, not 5 times. In addition, in religious literature, wajib is widely used for all kinds of religious requirements, without expressing any fiqh definition.

As seen above and in many other examples, classifications and labels have a relative character shaped by the understanding of the people and groups who make them. For example, believing in the existence and miracles of Awliya is presented as a "condition" for orthodox Islam by many prominent Sunni creed writers such as Al-Tahawi and Nasafi and is accepted in traditional Sunnis and Shi'ism. However, this understanding, along with expressions of respect and visits to the graves of saints, are seen as unacceptable heresy by puritanical and revivalist Islamic movements such as Salafism, Wahhabism and Islamic Modernism.

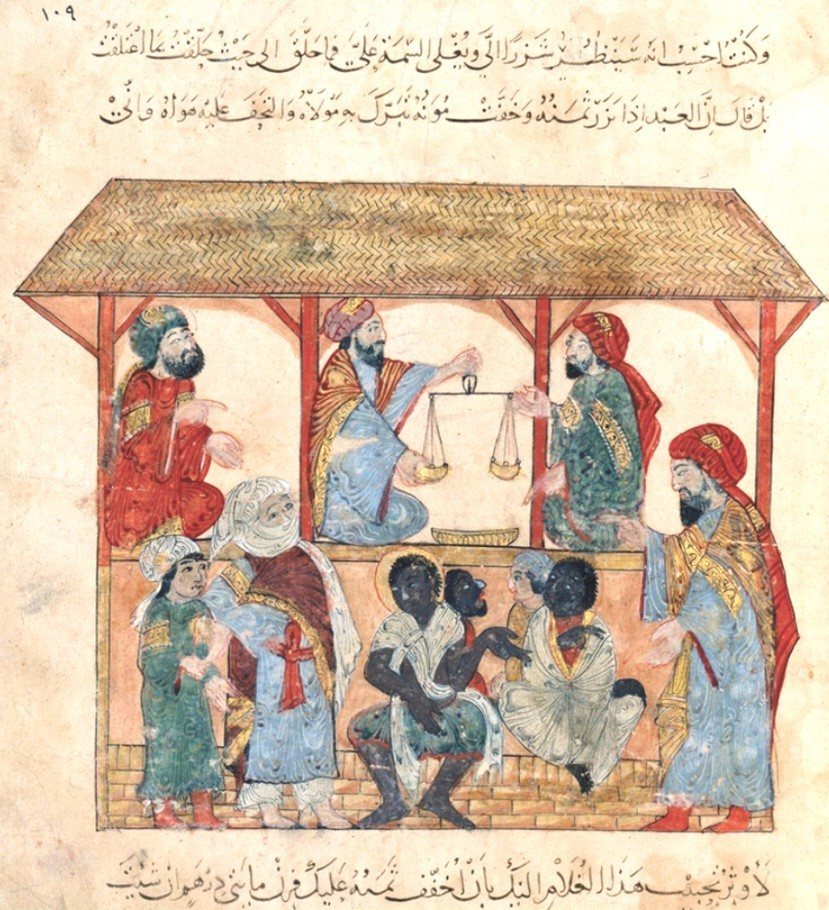
13th century slave market, during the era of slavery in Yemen. see also: Islamic views on concubinage.

About six verses address the way a woman should dress when in public; Muslim scholars have differed as how to understand these verses, with some stating that a Hijab is a command (fard) to be fulfilled (Note: By 1980, veiling was required in government and educational settings in Iran, with the 1983 penal code imposing 74 lashes for not adhering to the hijab, though the exact requirements were unclear. This led to public tensions and vigilante actions regarding proper hijab. Subsequent regulations in 1984 and 1988 clarified dress-code standards, and the current penal code prescribes fines or prison terms for failing to observe hijab, without detailing its specific form.) and others say simply not. (Note: Beyza Bilgin states that the expression 'let them put their outer coverings over themselves' in the 59th verse of Al-Ahzab was revealed because they harassed women under the conditions of that day, considering them to be concubines, and commented as follows: "In other words, veiling is a security issue that arose according to the needs of that period. These are not taken into consideration at all and are reflected as God's command. Women have been called God's command for a thousand years. Women said the same thing to their daughters and daughters-in-law." She said the following about covering herself in prayer : "They tell me; 'Do you cover yourself while praying?' Of course, I cover up when I'm in congregation. I am obliged not to disturb the peace. But I also pray with my head uncovered in my own home. Because the Quran's requirement for prayer is not covering up, but ablution and turning towards the qibla. This is a thousand year old issue. It's so ingrained in us. But this should definitely not be underestimated. Because people do it thinking it is God's command. But on the other hand, we should not declare a person who does not cover up as a bad woman.")

Islamic primary law sources, like the legal systems of classical antiquity and the ancient Near East, does not contain a true equivalent of the modern concept of rape, which is in turn based on the modern notions of individual autonomy and inviolability of the body, particularly the female body. Classical jurisprudence, attempted to fill this gap by likening rape to defined crimes such as adultery and hirabah. In some cases, this approach has had detrimental consequences for the victims. In Afghanistan and Dubai, some women who made accusations of rape have been charged with fornication or adultery.

The statement in the Qur'an that determines the status of slaves and concubines in the understanding of Sharia is as follows; ma malakat aymanuhum or milk al-yamin meaning "those whom your right hands possess". Hence, sexual use of female slaves was considered within of their definition that "they are the well-earned rewards or properties of their masters", and with a few exceptions, (Note: In Shiite jurisprudence, it is unlawful for a master of a female slave to grant a third party the use of her for sexual relations. The Shiite scholar Shaykh al-Tusi stated: ولا يجوز إعارتها للاستمتاع بها لأن البضع لا يستباح بالإعارة "It is not permissible to loan (the slave girl) for enjoyment purpose, because sexual intercourse cannot be legitimate through loaning" and the Shiite scholars al-Muhaqiq al-Kurki, Allamah Al-Hilli and Ali Asghar Merwarid made the following ruling: ولا تجوز استعارة الجواري للاستمتاع "It is not permissible to loan the slave girl for the purpose of sexual intercourse")

A special religious decision, which is "specific to" a person, group, institution, event, situation, belief and practice in different areas of life, and usually includes the approval/disapproval of a judgment, is called fatwa. Tazir penalties, which are outside the Qisas and Hudud laws, have not been codified, and their discretion and implementation are under the initiative and authority of the judge or political authority. Mustafa Öztürk points out some another developments in the Islamic creed, leading changes in ahkam such as determining the conditions of takfir according to theologians; First Muslims believed that God lived in the sky as Ahmad Ibn Hanbal says: "Whoever says that Allah is everywhere is a heretic, an infidel, should be invited to repent, but if he does not, be killed." This understanding changes later and gives way to the understanding that "God cannot be assigned a place and He is everywhere."

Judgment that concerns individuals is personal and, for example, in an Islamic Qisas or compensation decisions, jurist must take into account "personal labels" such as the gender, freedom, religious and social status such as mu'min, kafir, musta'min, dhimmi, apostate, etc. Similar distinctions also apply to witnessing practices, which have a fundamental value in the establishment of judicial provisions, such as the identification of the criminals. Islamic preachers constantly emphasize the importance of adalah, and in trials, the judge is not expected to observe equality among those on trial, but is expected to act fairly or balanced. Traditional fiqh states that legal and religious responsibility begins with rushd.

=== Topics and details (furūʿ al-fiqh) ===
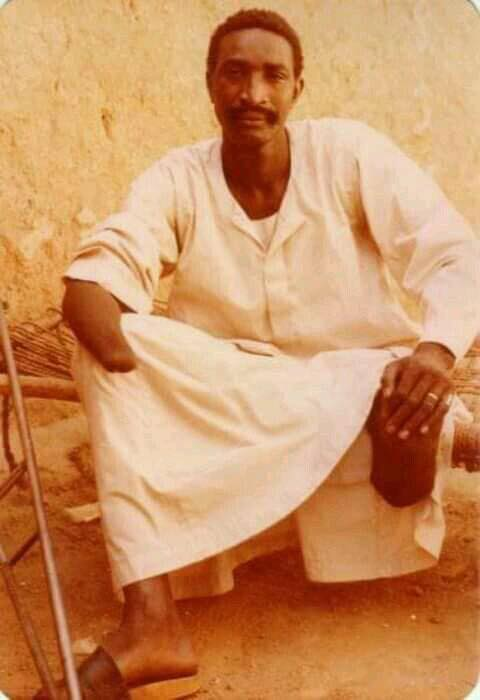
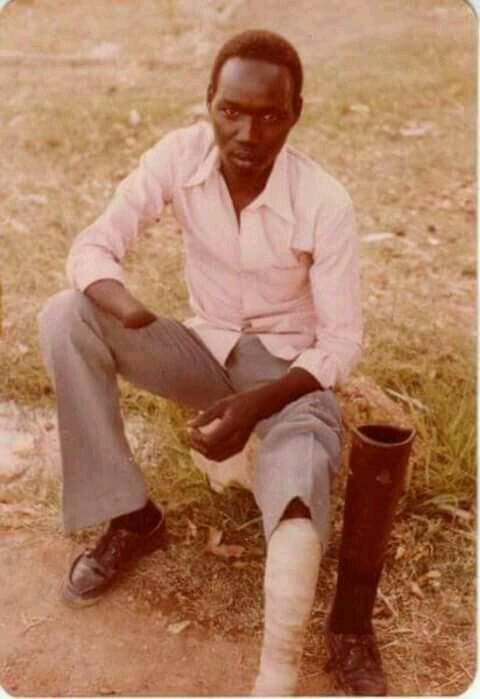
Cross amputation survivors, 1983 Sudan; A concrete manifestation of the hirabah penalty enforced under Jaafar Nimeiry’s September Laws, derived from a literal reading of Quran 5:33; illustrate the consequences of presenting the Quran as a timeless, immutable legal code, stripped of its historical context as well as the imposition of an irreversible, physical penalty for an abstract crime.

The domain of furūʿ al-fiqh (lit. branches of fiqh) is traditionally divided into ʿibādāt (rituals or acts of worship) and muʿāmalāt (social relations). Many jurists further divided the body of substantive jurisprudence into "the four quarters", called rituals, sales, marriage and injuries. Each of these terms figuratively stood for a variety of subjects. For example, the quarter of sales would encompass partnerships, guaranty, gifts, and bequests, among other topics. Juristic works were arranged as a sequence of such smaller topics, each called a "book" (kitab). The special significance of ritual was marked by always placing its discussion at the start of the work.

Some historians distinguish a field of Islamic criminal law, which combines several traditional categories. Several crimes with scripturally prescribed punishments are known as hudud. Jurists developed various restrictions which in many cases made them virtually impossible to apply. Other crimes involving intentional bodily harm are judged according to a version of lex talionis that prescribes a punishment analogous to the crime (qisas), but the victims or their heirs may accept a monetary compensation (diya) or pardon the perpetrator instead; only diya is imposed for non-intentional harm. Other criminal cases belong to the category of taʿzīr, where the goal of punishment is correction or rehabilitation of the culprit and its form is largely left to the judge's discretion.

Which crime falls into which category may vary depending on understanding. For example, according to some verses and hadiths, those who avoided alms and prayers were the ones to be fought against,) and according to some understandings, they were people who had abandoned religion – theologians debated whether worship was a part of faith – and according to classical fiqh sects, they were people who should be killed. However, even if today's dominant understanding defines the abandonment of worship as sinfulness, does not approve of giving worldly punishment for them. However, in Sharia governments, their testimony against a devout Muslim may not be accepted, they may be humiliated and barred from certain positions because of this tag. In practice, since early on in Islamic history, criminal cases were usually handled by ruler-administered courts or local police using procedures which were only loosely related to Sharia.

The two major genres of furūʿ literature are the mukhtasar (concise summary of law) and the mabsut (extensive commentary). Mukhtasars were short specialized treatises or general overviews that could be used in a classroom or consulted by judges. A mabsut, which usually provided a commentary on a mukhtasar and could stretch to dozens of large volumes, recorded alternative rulings with their justifications, often accompanied by a proliferation of cases and conceptual distinctions. The terminology of juristic literature was conservative and tended to preserve notions which had lost their practical relevance. At the same time, the cycle of abridgement and commentary allowed jurists of each generation to articulate a modified body of law to meet changing social conditions. Other juristic genres include the qawāʿid (succinct formulas meant to aid the student remember general principles) and collections of fatwas by a particular scholar.

=== Schools of law and characteristics ===
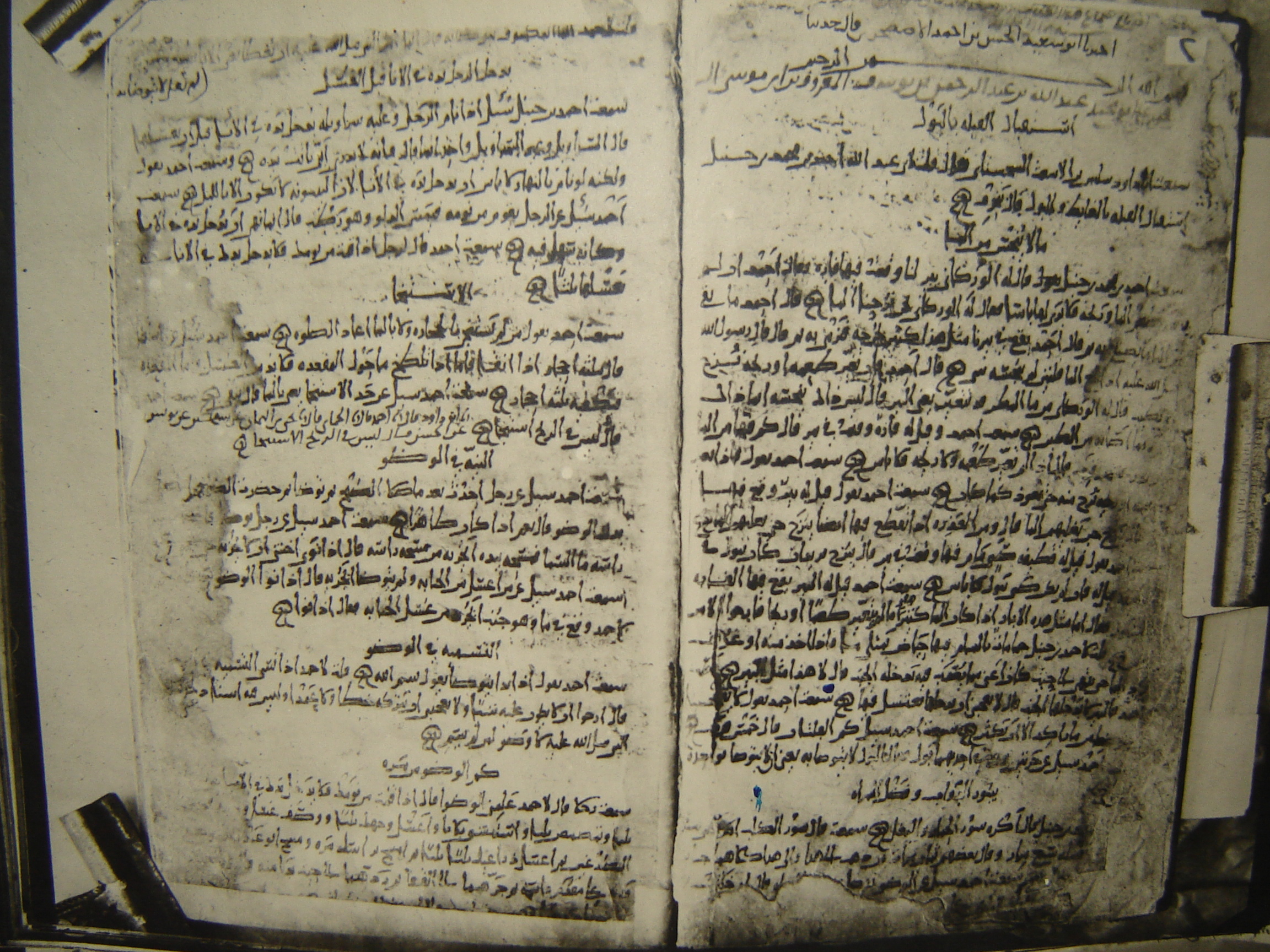
Juristic exchange between Abu Dawood and Ibn Hanbal. One of the oldest literary manuscripts of the Islamic world, dated October 879 AD.

Schools of Islamic law (madhhabs) are not static, rigid texts resulting from pre-conceived theories. Juristic thought gradually developed in study circles, -later referred to as schools of law- where independent scholars met to learn from a local master and discuss religious topics.

At first, these circles were fluid in their membership, but with time distinct regional legal schools crystallized around shared sets of methodological principles. The distinctive character of each school was shaped by the geography and socio-cultural environment in which it emerged, as well as by the crises of the era and interactions with political authorities. These structures are distinguished from one another by their unique epistemological stances, methodological choices, and interpretive frameworks.

Ultimately, traditionalist, rationalist, and synthesizing approaches—along with text-oriented/reactionary or political leanings—constitute the primary elements that define the fundamental identity and fabric of these schools. As the boundaries of the schools became clearly delineated, the authority of their doctrinal tenets came to be vested in a master jurist from earlier times, who was henceforth identified as the school's founder. In the course of the first three centuries of Islam, all legal schools came to accept the broad outlines of classical legal theory, according to which Islamic law had to be firmly rooted in the Quran and hadith.

The main Sunni schools of law are the Hanafi, Maliki, Shafi'i and Hanbali madhhabs. They emerged in the ninth and tenth centuries and by the twelfth century almost all jurists aligned themselves with a particular madhhab. These four schools recognize each other's validity and they have interacted in legal debate over the centuries. Rulings of these schools are followed across the Muslim world without exclusive regional restrictions, but they each came to dominate in different parts of the world.

For example, the Maliki school is predominant in North and West Africa; the Hanafi school in South and Central Asia; the Shafi'i school in Lower Egypt, East Africa, and Southeast Asia; and the Hanbali school in North and Central Arabia. The first centuries of Islam also witnessed a number of short-lived Sunni madhhabs. The Zahiri school, which is commonly identified as extinct, continues to exert influence over legal thought. The development of Shia legal schools occurred along the lines of theological differences of Imamate and resulted in formation of the Twelver, Zaidi and Ismaili madhhabs, whose differences from Sunni legal schools are roughly of the same order as the differences among Sunni schools. The Ibadi school —a distinct school of jurisprudence that emerged from the Kharijite movement, which began as a radical rebellion against the elitism and rule of lineage (whether the Sunni tradition developing under the Umayyad and Abbasid dynasties rooted in the Quraysh, or the Shi'a tradition centered on the Ahl al-Bayt) (Note: The Ibadis reject the belief that the leader of the Muslim community must be descended from the Quraysh tribe. (This differs from the Sunni belief and also the Shia belief which holds that ideally and eventually Muslims will be ruled by the Mahdi, who will be descended from Muhammad's household – Ahl al-Bayt – Muhammad having been a member of the Quraysh tribe.))— is predominant in Oman and distinguishes itself from other schools by advocating for an elective and accountable imamate.

== Pre-modern Islamic legal system ==
=== Jurists ===
Sharia was traditionally interpreted by muftis. During the first few centuries of Islam, muftis were private legal specialists who normally also held other jobs. They issued fatwas (legal opinions), generally free of charge, in response to questions from laypersons or requests for consultation coming from judges, which would be stated in general terms. Fatwas were regularly upheld in courts, and when they were not, it was usually because the fatwa was contradicted by a more authoritative legal opinion. The stature of jurists was determined by their scholarly reputation. The majority of classical legal works, written by author-jurists, were based in large part on fatwas of distinguished muftis.

These fatwas functioned as a form of legal precedent, unlike court verdicts, which were valid only for the given case. Although independent muftis never disappeared, from the 12th century onward Muslim rulers began to appoint salaried muftis to answer questions from the public. Over the centuries, Sunni muftis were gradually incorporated into state bureaucracies, while Shia jurists in Iran progressively asserted an autonomous authority starting from the early modern era.

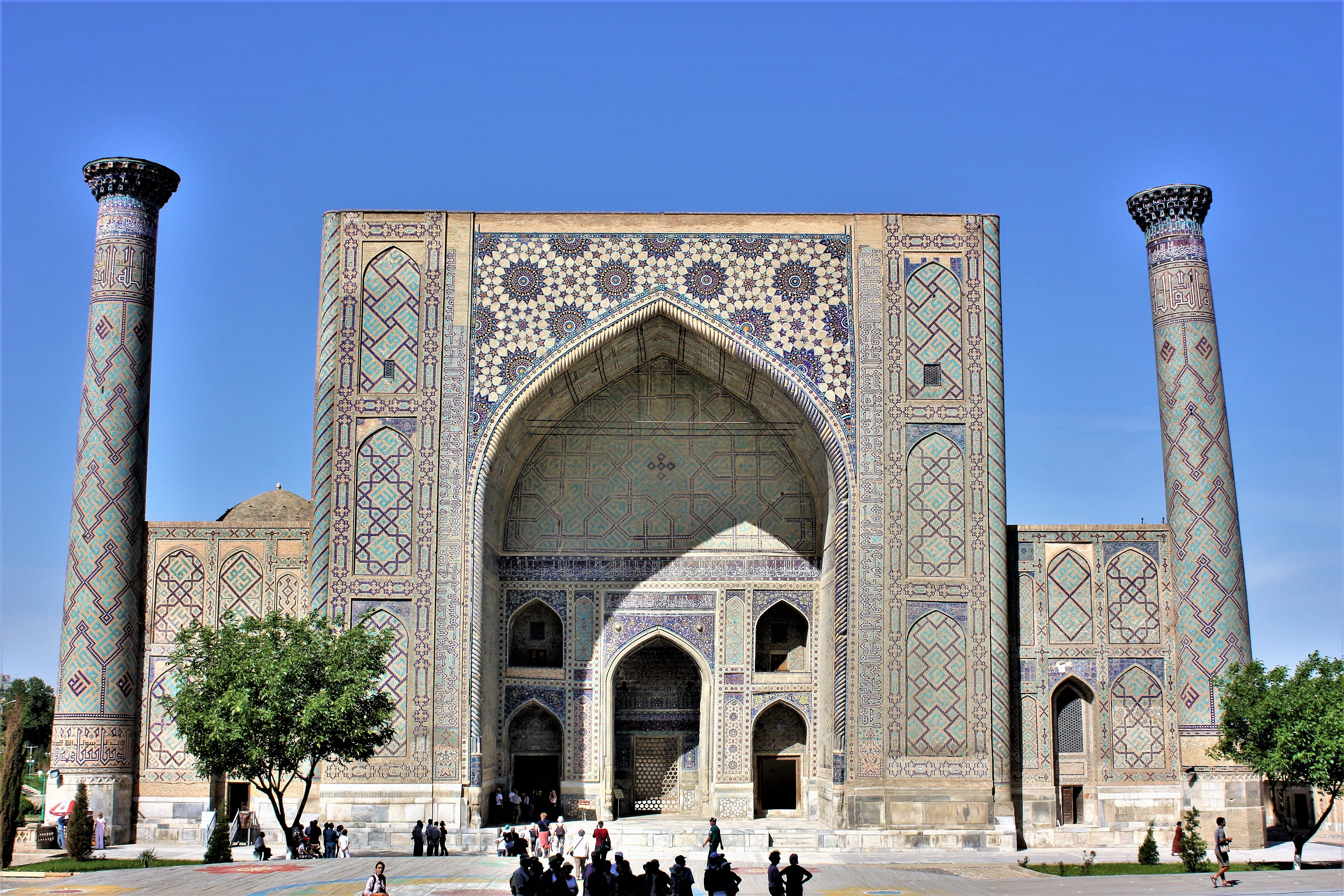
Ulugh Beg Madrasa, Samarkand (est. 1422)

Islamic law was initially taught in study circles that gathered in mosques and private homes. The teacher, assisted by advanced students, provided commentary on concise treatises of law and examined the students' understanding of the text. This tradition continued to be practiced in madrasas, which spread during the 10th and 11th centuries.

Madrasas were institutions of higher learning devoted principally to study of law, but also offering other subjects such as theology, medicine, and mathematics. The madrasa complex usually consisted of a mosque, boarding house, and a library. It was maintained by a waqf (charitable endowment), which paid salaries of professors, stipends of students, and defrayed the costs of construction and maintenance. At the end of a course, the professor granted a license (ijaza) certifying a student's competence in its subject matter.

Students specializing in law would complete a curriculum consisting of preparatory studies, the doctrines of a particular madhhab, and training in legal disputation, and finally write a dissertation, which earned them a license to teach and issue fatwas.

=== Courts ===
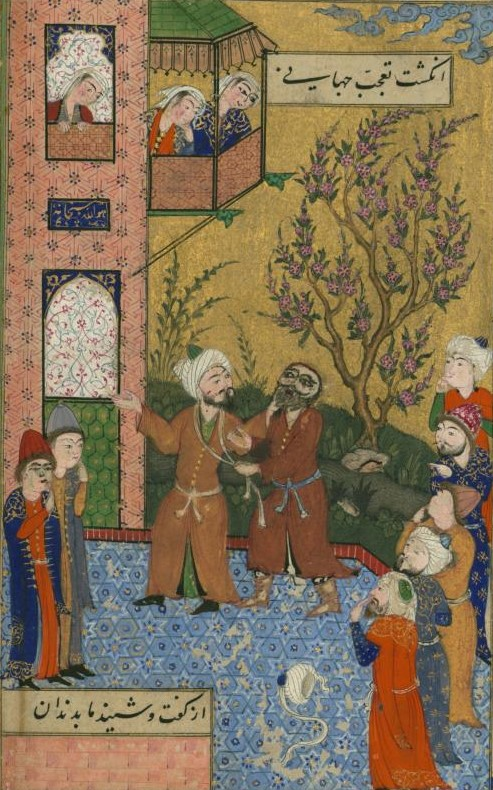
The poet Saadi and a dervish go to settle their quarrel before a judge (16th century Persian miniature).

A judge (qadi) was in charge of the qadi's court (mahkama), also called the Sharia court. Qadis were trained in Islamic law, though not necessarily to a level required to issue fatwas. Court personnel also included a number of assistants performing various roles. Judges were theoretically independent in their decisions, though they were appointed by the ruler and often experienced pressure from members of the ruling elite where their interests were at play.

The role of qadis was to evaluate the evidence, establish the facts of the case, and issue a verdict based on the applicable rulings of Islamic jurisprudence. The qadi was supposed to solicit a fatwa from a mufti if it was unclear how the law should be applied to the case.

Since Islamic legal theory does not recognize the distinction between private and public law, court procedures were identical for civil and criminal cases, and required a private plaintiff to produce evidence against the defendant. The main type of evidence was oral witness testimony. The standards of evidence for criminal cases were so strict that a conviction was often difficult to obtain even for apparently clear-cut cases. Most historians believe that because of these stringent procedural norms, qadi's courts at an early date lost their jurisdiction over criminal cases, which were instead handled in other types of courts.

If an accusation did not result in a verdict in a qadi's court, the plaintiff could often pursue it in another type of court called the mazalim court, administered by the ruler's council. The rationale for mazalim (lit. wrongs, grievances) courts was to address the wrongs that Sharia courts were unable to address, including complaints against government officials. Islamic jurists were commonly in attendance and a judge often presided over the court as a deputy of the ruler. Mazalim verdicts were supposed to conform to the spirit of Sharia, but they were not bound by the letter of the law or the procedural restrictions of qadi's courts.

The police (shurta), which took initiative in preventing and investigating crime, operated its own courts. Like the mazalim courts, police courts were not bound by the rules of Sharia and had the powers to inflict discretionary punishments. Another office for maintaining public order was the muhtasib (market inspector), who was charged with preventing fraud in economic transactions and infractions against public morality. The muhtasib took an active role in pursuing these types of offenses and meted out punishments based on local custom.

=== Punishments ===
The classical Islamic legal tradition did not have a separate category for criminal law as does modern law. The classical Islamic jurisprudence typically divided the subject matter of law into four "quarters", that is rituals, sales, marriage, and injuries. In modern usage, Islamic criminal law has been extracted and collated from that classical Islamic jurisprudence literature into three categories of rules: As crimes against God they cannot be forgiven but the punishments are seldom enforced as they can be averted by the slightest doubts or ambiguities.

- Hadd (literally "borders, boundaries, limits") is applied to punishments (ranging from public lashing, public stoning to death, amputation of hands, crucifixion, depending on the crime), for a limited number of crimes (murder, adultery, slander, theft, etc.), for which punishments have been determined (or traditionally thought to have been determined) in the verses of Quran.
- Qisas, (literally "retaliation in kind") and diya, (دية) ("blood money"), in Islamic jurisprudence, are the second category of crimes, where Sharia specifies equal retaliation (qisas) or monetary compensation (diya), as a possible punishment. Included in this category is homicide, for example, which Islamic law treats as a civil dispute between believers. Qisas principle is available against the accused, to the victim or victim's heirs, when a Muslim is murdered, suffers bodily injury or suffers property damage. In the case of murder, qisas means the right of a murder victim's nearest relative or wali (ولي) (legal guardian) to, if the court approves, take the life of the killer or do it in his behalf.
- Tazir (literally "to punish", sometimes spelled as taazir, ti'zar, tazar, ta'azar) is the third category, and refers to offense mentioned in the Quran or the Hadiths, but where neither the Quran nor the Hadiths specify a punishment. In Tazir cases, the punishment is at the discretion of the state, the ruler, or a qadi (kadi), or court acting on behalf of the ruler. Tazir punishment is for actions which are considered sinful in Islam, undermine the Muslim community, or threaten public order during Islamic rule, but those that are not punishable as hadd or qisas crimes. The legal restrictions on the exercise of that power are not specified in the Quran or the Hadiths, and vary. The judge enjoys considerable leeway in deciding an appropriate form of punishment, and the punishment does not have to be consistent across the accused persons or over time. The ruler or qadi also has the discretion to forgive tazir offenses.

=== Socio-political context ===
The social fabric of pre-modern Islamic societies was largely defined by close-knit communities organized around kinship groups and local neighborhoods. Conflicts between individuals had the potential to escalate into a conflict between their supporting groups and disrupt the life of the entire community. Court litigation was seen as a last resort for cases where informal mediation had failed. This attitude was reflected in the legal maxim "amicable settlement is the best verdict" (al-sulh sayyid al-ahkam).

In court disputes, qadis were generally less concerned with legal theory than with achieving an outcome that enabled the disputants to resume their previous social relationships. This could be accomplished by avoiding a total loss for the losing side or simply giving them a chance to articulate their position in public and obtain a measure of psychological vindication. Islamic law required judges to be familiar with local customs, and they exercised a number of other public functions in the community, including mediation and arbitration, supervision of public works, auditing waqf finances, and looking after the interests of orphans.

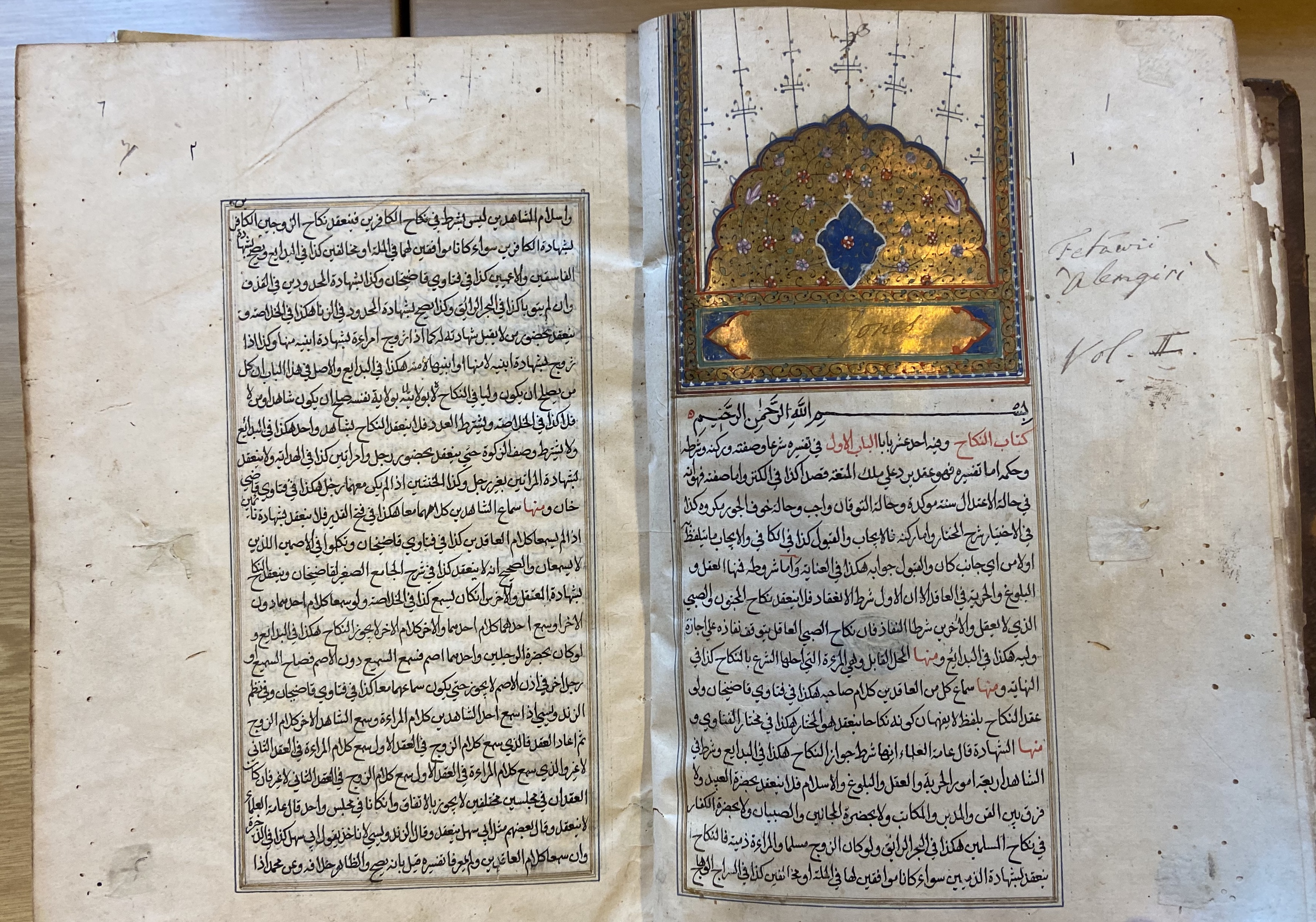
Manuscript copy of al-Fatawa al-'Alamgiri

Unlike pre-modern cultures where the ruling dynasty promulgated the law, Islamic law was formulated by religious scholars without involvement of the rulers. The law derived its authority not from political control, but rather from the collective doctrinal positions of the legal schools (madhhabs) in their capacity as interpreters of the scriptures. The ulema (religious scholars) were involved in management of communal affairs and acted as representatives of the Muslim population vis-à-vis the ruling dynasties, who before the modern era had limited capacity for direct governance. Military elites relied on the ulema for religious legitimation, with financial support for religious institutions being one of the principal means through which these elites established their legitimacy.

In turn, the ulema depended on the support of the ruling elites for the continuing operation of religious institutions. Although the relationship between secular rulers and religious scholars underwent a number of shifts and transformations in different times and places, this mutual dependence characterized Islamic history until the start of the modern era. Additionally, since Sharia contained few provisions in several areas of public law, Muslim rulers were able to legislate various collections of economic, criminal and administrative laws outside the jurisdiction of Islamic jurists, the most famous of which is the qanun promulgated by Ottoman sultans beginning from the 15th century. The Mughal emperor Aurangzeb (r. 1658–1707) issued a hybrid body of law known as Fatawa-e-Alamgiri, based on Hanafi fatwas as well as decisions of Islamic courts, and made it applicable to all religious communities on the Indian subcontinent. This early attempt to turn Islamic law into semi-codified state legislation sparked rebellions against Mughal rule.

==== Women, non-Muslims, slaves ====
In both the rules of civil disputes and application of penal law, classical Sharia distinguishes between men and women, between Muslims and non-Muslims, and between free persons and slaves.

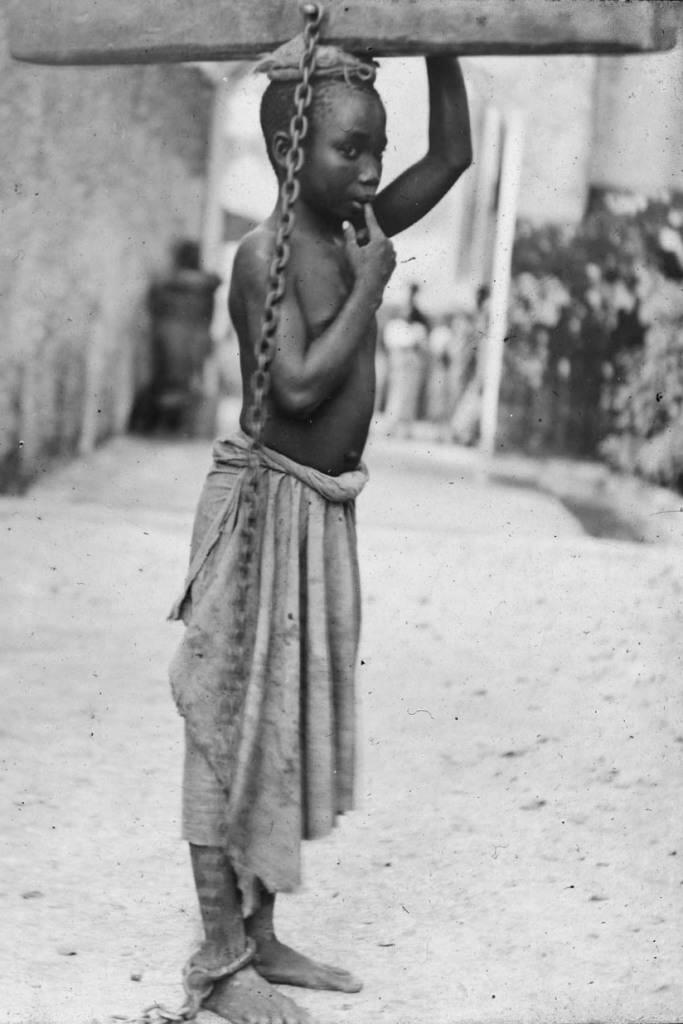
Zanzibar child slave sentenced to transport logs by Arab master in Sultanate, 1890s

Traditional Islamic law assumes a patriarchal society with a man at the head of the household. Different legal schools formulated a variety of legal norms which could be manipulated to the advantage of men or women, but women were generally at a disadvantage with respect to the rules of inheritance and witness testimony, where in some cases a woman's witness testimony is effectively treated as half of that of a man.

Various financial obligations imposed on the husband acted as a deterrent against unilateral divorce and commonly gave the wife financial leverage in divorce proceedings. Women were active in Sharia courts as both plaintiffs and defendants in a wide variety of cases, though some opted to be represented by a male relative.

Sharia was intended to regulate affairs of the Muslim community. Non-Muslims residing under Islamic rule had the legal status of dhimmi, which entailed a number of protections, restrictions, freedoms and legal inequalities, including payment of the jizya tax. Dhimmi communities had legal autonomy to adjudicate their internal affairs. Cases involving litigants from two different religious groups fell under jurisdiction of Sharia courts, where (unlike in secular courts) testimony of non-Muslim witnesses against a Muslim was inadmissible in criminal cases or at all. This legal framework was implemented with varying degree of rigor. In some periods or towns, all inhabitants apparently used the same court without regard for their religious affiliation. The Mughal emperor Aurangzeb imposed Islamic law on all his subjects, including provisions traditionally applicable only to Muslims, while some of his predecessors and successors are said to have abolished jizya.

According to Ottoman records, non-Muslim women took their cases to a Sharia court when they expected a more favorable outcome on marital, divorce and property questions than in Christian and Jewish courts. Over time, non Muslims in the Ottoman Empire could be more or less likely to use Islamic courts. For example, in 1729 at the Islamic court in Galata only two percent of cases involved non-Muslims whereas in 1789 non-Muslims were a part of thirty percent of cases. Ottoman court records also reflect the use of Islamic courts by formerly non-Muslim women. As it was illegal for non-Muslims to own Muslims and for non-Muslim men to marry Muslim women in the Ottoman empire, conversion to Islam would have been an option for non-Muslim women to free themselves of a spouse or master they did not want to subject to. However, this would likely lead to them being shunned by their former community.

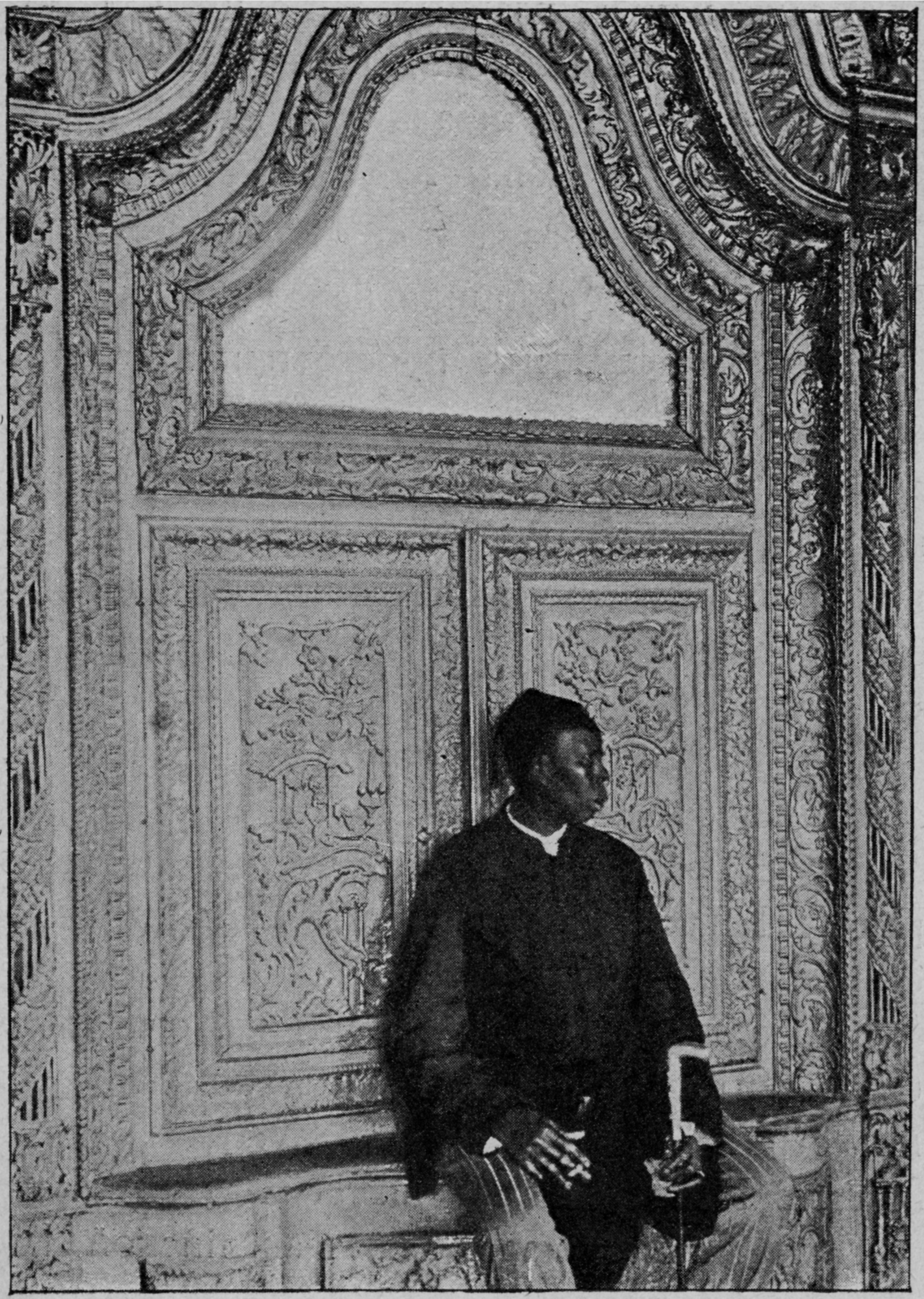
Chief Eunuch of Abdul Hamid II (1912)

Classical fiqh acknowledges and regulates slavery as a legitimate institution. It granted slaves certain rights and protections, improving their status relative to Greek and Roman law, and restricted the scenarios under which people could be enslaved. However, slaves could not inherit or enter into a contract, and were subject to their master's will in a number of ways. The labor and property of slaves were owned by the master, who was also entitled to sexual submission of his unmarried slaves.

Formal legal disabilities for some groups coexisted with a legal culture that viewed Sharia as a reflection of universal principles of justice, which involved protection of the weak against injustices committed by the strong. This conception was reinforced by the historical practice of Sharia courts, where peasants "almost always" won cases against oppressive landowners, and non-Muslims often prevailed in disputes against Muslims, including such powerful figures as the governor of their province. In family matters the Sharia court was seen as a place where the rights of women could be asserted against their husband's transgressions.

=== Under colonial rule ===
Starting from the 17th century, European powers began to extend political influence over lands ruled by Muslim dynasties, and by the end of the 19th century, much of the Muslim world came under colonial domination. The first areas of Islamic law to be impacted were usually commercial and criminal laws, which impeded colonial administration and were soon replaced by European regulations. Islamic commercial laws were also replaced by European (mostly French) laws in Muslim states which retained formal independence, because these states increasingly came to rely on Western capital and could not afford to lose the business of foreign merchants who refused to submit to Islamic regulations.

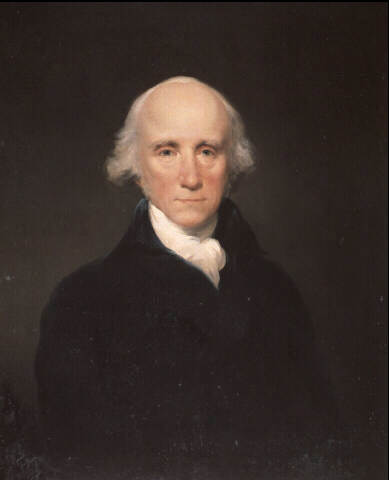
Warren Hastings initiated far-reaching legal reforms in British India.

The first significant changes to the legal system of British India were initiated in the late 18th century by the governor of Bengal Warren Hastings. Hastings' plan of legal reform envisioned a multi-tiered court system for the Muslim population, with a middle tier of British judges advised by local Islamic jurists, and a lower tier of courts operated by qadis. Hastings also commissioned a translation of the classic manual of Hanafi fiqh, Al-Hidayah, from Arabic into Persian and then English, later complemented by other texts.

These translations enabled British judges to pass verdicts in the name of Islamic law based on a combination of Sharia rules and common law doctrines, and eliminated the need to rely on consultation by local ulema, whom they mistrusted. In the traditional Islamic context, a concise text like Al-Hidayah would be used as a basis for classroom commentary by a professor, and the doctrines thus learned would be mediated in court by judicial discretion, consideration of local customs and availability of different legal opinions that could fit the facts of the case. The British use of Al-Hidayah, which amounted to an inadvertent codification of Sharia, and its interpretation by judges trained in Western legal traditions anticipated later legal reforms in the Muslim world.

British administrators felt that Sharia rules too often allowed criminals to escape punishment, as exemplified by Hastings' complaint that Islamic law was "founded on the most lenient principles and on an abhorrence of bloodshed". In the course of the 19th century, criminal laws and other aspects of the Islamic legal system in India were supplanted by British law, with the exception of Sharia rules retained in family laws and some property transactions. Among other changes, these reforms brought about abolition of slavery, prohibition of child marriage, and a much more frequent use of capital punishment.

The resulting legal system, known as Anglo-Muhammadan law, was treated by the British as a model for legal reforms in their other colonies. Like the British in India, colonial administrations typically sought to obtain precise and authoritative information about indigenous laws, which prompted them to prefer classical Islamic legal texts over local judicial practice. This, together with their conception of Islamic law as a collection of inflexible rules, led to an emphasis on traditionalist forms of Sharia that were not rigorously applied in the pre-colonial period and served as a formative influence on the modern identity politics of the Muslim world.

=== Ottoman Empire ===
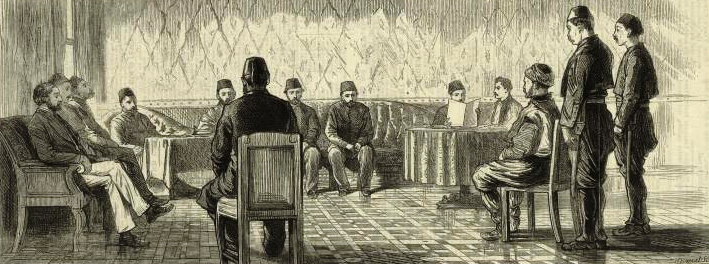
An Ottoman courtroom (1879 AD drawing)

During the colonial era, Muslim rulers concluded that they could not resist European pressure unless they modernized their armies and built centrally administered states along the lines of Western models. In the Ottoman Empire, the first such changes in the legal sphere involved placing the formerly independent waqfs under state control. This reform, passed in 1826, enriched the public treasury at the expense of the waqfs, thereby depleting the financial support for traditional Islamic legal education. Over the second half of the 19th century, a new hierarchical system of secular courts was established to supplement and eventually replace most religious courts. Students hoping to pursue legal careers in the new court system increasingly preferred attending secular schools over the traditional path of legal education with its dimming financial prospects.

The Tanzimat reforms of the 19th century saw reorganization of both Islamic civil law and sultanic criminal law after the model of the Napoleonic Code. In the 1870s, a codification of civil law and procedure (excepting marriage and divorce), called the Mecelle, was produced for use in both Sharia and secular courts. It adopted the Turkish language for the benefit of the new legal class who no longer possessed competence in the Arabic idiom of traditional jurisprudence. The code was based on Hanafi law, and its authors selected minority opinions over authoritative ones when they were felt to better "suit the present conditions". The Mecelle was promulgated as a qanun (sultanic code), which represented an unprecedented assertion of the state's authority over Islamic civil law, traditionally the preserve of the ulema.

The 1917 Ottoman Law of Family Rights adopted an innovative approach of drawing rules from minority and majority opinions of all Sunni madhhabs with a modernizing intent. The Republic of Turkey, which emerged after the dissolution of the Ottoman Empire, abolished its Sharia courts and replaced Ottoman civil laws with the Swiss Civil Code, but Ottoman civil laws remained in force for several decades in Jordan, Lebanon, Palestine, Syria, and Iraq.

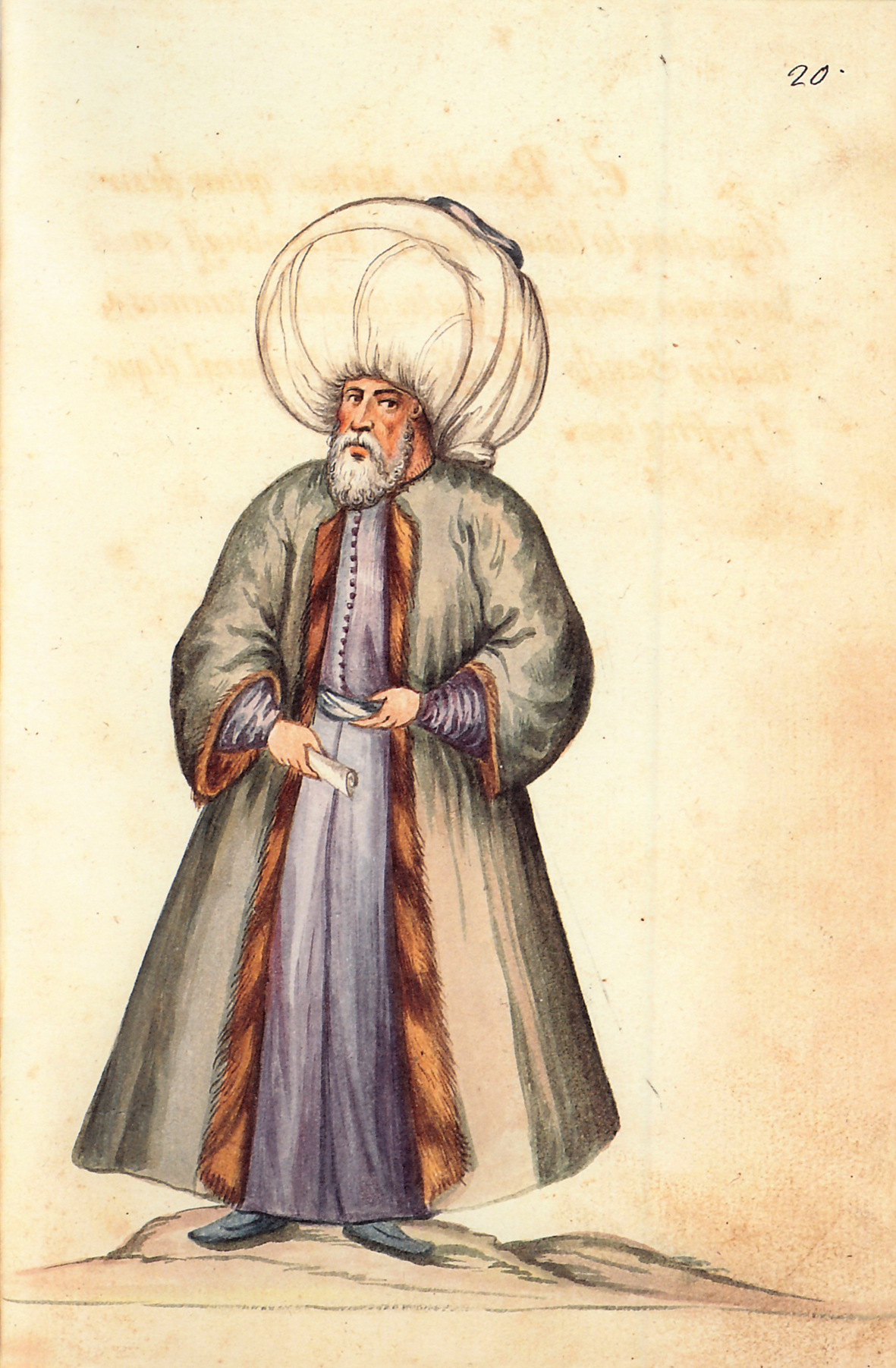
Turkish mufti (17th-century Spanish drawing)

=== Nation states ===
Westernization of legal institutions and expansion of state control in all areas of law, which began during the colonial era, continued in nation-states of the Muslim world. Sharia courts at first continued to exist alongside state courts as in earlier times, but the doctrine that sultanic courts should implement the ideals of Sharia was gradually replaced by legal norms imported from Europe. Court procedures were also brought in line with European practice.

Though the Islamic terms qadi and mahkama (qadi's/Sharia court) were preserved, they generally came to mean judge and court in the Western sense. While in the traditional Sharia court all parties represented themselves, in modern courts they are represented by professional lawyers educated in Western-style law schools, and the verdicts are subject to review in an appeals court. In the 20th century, most countries abolished a parallel system of Sharia courts and brought all cases under a national civil court system.

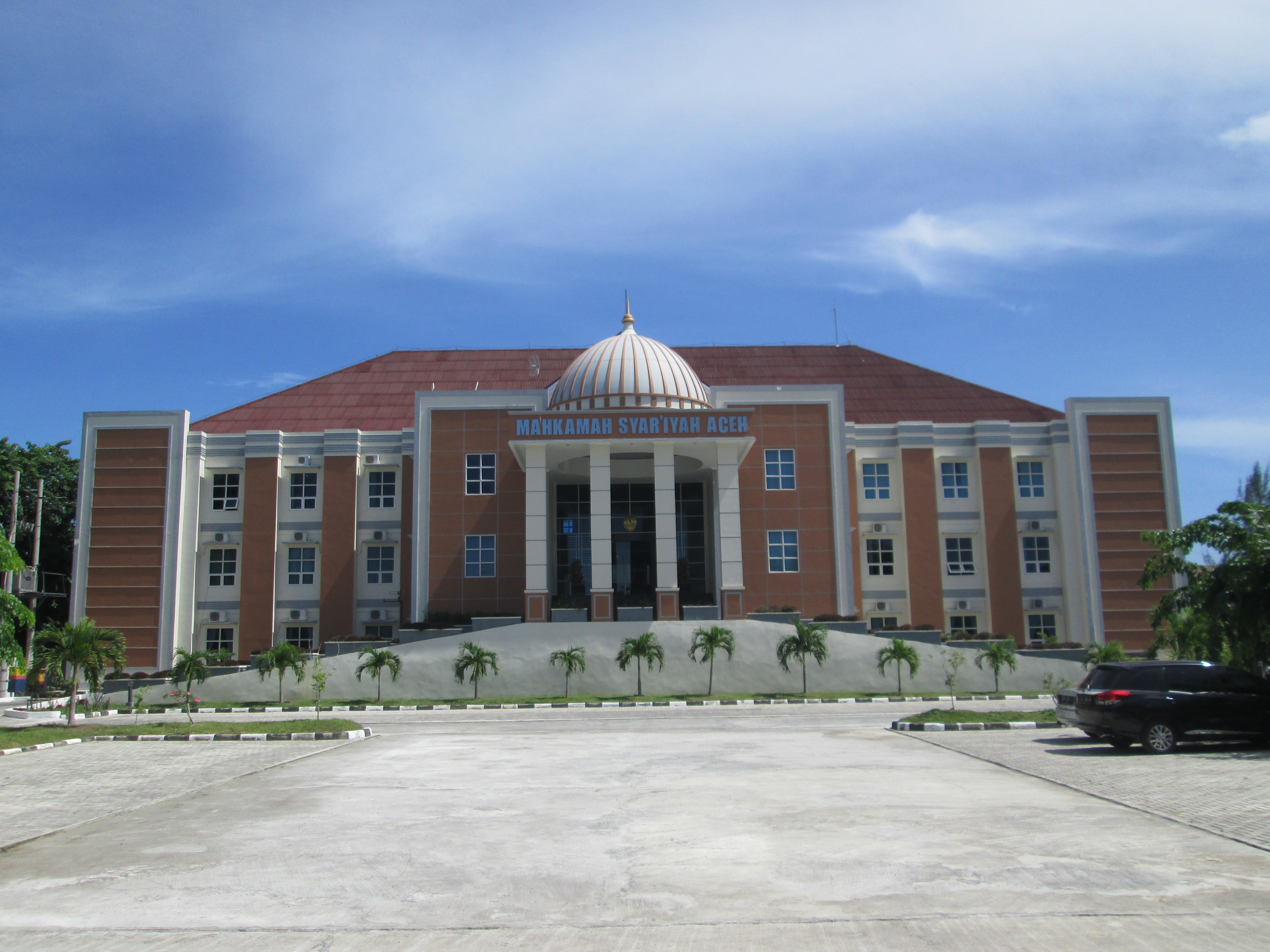
Mahkamah Syariyah (Sharia court) in Aceh, Indonesia

In most Muslim-majority countries, traditional rules of classical fiqh have been largely preserved only in family law. In some countries religious minorities such as Christians or Shia Muslims have been subject to separate systems of family laws. In Lebanon for example a 1926 decree of the French High Commissioner in Mandate Lebanon recognized the Shi’a as an independent religious community, with personal status judged under the Ja’fari rite. Thus shaping a sepearte legal system for family law in Lebanon.

Many Muslims today believe that contemporary Sharia-based laws are an authentic representation of the pre-modern legal tradition. In reality, they generally represent the result of extensive legal reforms made in the modern era. As traditional Islamic jurists lost their role as authoritative interpreters of the laws applied in courts, these laws were codified by legislators and administered by state systems which employed a number of devices to effect changes, including:

- Selection of alternative opinions from traditional legal literature (takhayyur), potentially among multiple madhhabs or denominations, and combining parts of different rulings (talfiq).
- Appeal to the classical doctrines of necessity (darura), public interest (maslaha), and the objectives (maqasid) of Sharia, which played a limited role in classical fiqh, but were now given wider utilitarian applications.
- Changes in administrative law that grant the courts discretionary powers to restrict certain practices which are not forbidden by substantive law (e.g., polygamy), in some cases imposing penal sanctions as additional deterrence.
- Modernist interpretation of Islamic scriptures without adherence to the rules or methodologies of traditional jurisprudence, known as neo-ijtihad.

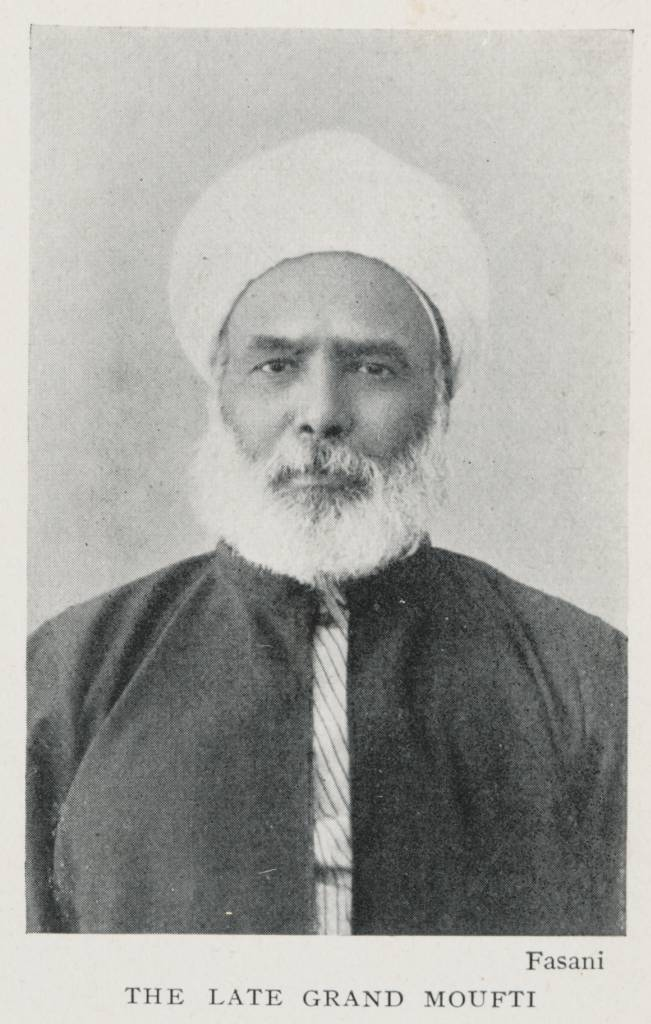
Muhammad Abduh exercised a powerful influence on liberal reformist thought.

The most powerful influence on liberal reformist thought came from the work of the Egyptian Islamic scholar Muhammad ʿAbduh (1849–1905). Abduh viewed only Sharia rules pertaining to religious rituals as inflexible, and argued that the other Islamic laws should be adapted based on changing circumstances in consideration of social well-being. Following precedents of earlier Islamic thinkers, he advocated restoring Islam to its original purity by returning to the Quran and the sunna instead of following the medieval schools of jurisprudence. He championed a creative approach to ijtihad that involved direct interpretation of scriptures as well as the methods of takhayyur and talfiq.

One of the most influential figures in modern legal reforms was the Egyptian legal scholar Abd El-Razzak El-Sanhuri (1895–1971), who possessed expertise in both Islamic and Western law. Sanhuri argued that reviving Islamic legal heritage in a way that served the needs of contemporary society required its analysis in light of the modern science of comparative law. He drafted the civil codes of Egypt (1949) and Iraq (1951) based on a variety of sources, including classical fiqh, European laws, existing Arab and Turkish codes, and the history of local court decisions. Sanhuri's Egyptian code incorporated few classical Sharia rules, but he drew on traditional jurisprudence more frequently for the Iraqi code. Sanhuri's codes were subsequently adopted in some form by most Arab countries.

Aside from the radical reforms of Islamic family law carried out in Tunisia (1956) and Iran (1967), governments often preferred to make changes that made a clear break from traditional Sharia rules by imposing administrative hurdles rather than changing the rules themselves, in order to minimize objections from religious conservatives. Various procedural changes have been made in a number of countries to restrict polygamy, give women greater rights in divorce, and eliminate child marriage. Inheritance has been the legal domain least susceptible to reform, as legislators have been generally reluctant to tamper with the highly technical system of Quranic shares.

Some reforms have faced strong conservative opposition. For example, the 1979 reform of Egyptian family law, promulgated by Anwar Sadat through presidential decree, provoked an outcry and was annulled in 1985 by the supreme court on procedural grounds, to be later replaced by a compromise version. The 2003 reform of Moroccan family law, which sought to reconcile universal human rights norms and the country's Islamic heritage, was drafted by a commission that included parliamentarians, religious scholars and feminist activists, and the result has been praised by international rights groups as an example of progressive legislation achieved within an Islamic framework.

=== Islamization ===
The Islamic revival of the late 20th century brought the topic of Sharia to international attention in the form of numerous political campaigns in the Muslim world calling for full implementation of Sharia. A number of factors have contributed to the rise of these movements, classified under the rubric of Islamism or political Islam, including the failure of authoritarian secular regimes to meet the expectations of their citizens, and a desire of Muslim populations to return to more culturally authentic forms of socio-political organization in the face of a perceived cultural invasion from the West.

Shiite leaders such as Ayatollah Khomeini drew on leftist anticolonialist rhetoric by framing their call for Sharia as a resistance struggle. They accused secular leaders of corruption and predatory behavior, and claimed that a return to Sharia would replace despotic rulers with pious leaders striving for social and economic justice. In the Arab world these positions are often encapsulated in the slogan "Islam is the solution" (al-Islam huwa al-hall).

Full implementation of Sharia theoretically refers to expanding its scope to all fields of law and all areas of public life. In practice, Islamization campaigns have focused on a few highly visible issues associated with the conservative Muslim identity, particularly women's hijab and the hudud criminal punishments (whipping, stoning and amputation) prescribed for certain crimes.

For many Islamists, hudud punishments are at the core of the divine Sharia because they are specified by the letter of scripture rather than by human interpreters. Modern Islamists have often rejected, at least in theory, the stringent procedural constraints developed by classical jurists to restrict their application. To the broader Muslim public, the calls for Sharia often represent, even more than any specific demands, a vague vision of their current economic and political situation being replaced by a "just utopia".

A number of legal reforms have been made under the influence of these movements, starting from the 1970s when Egypt and Syria amended their constitutions to specify Sharia as the basis of legislation. The Iranian Revolution of 1979 represented a watershed for Shiism advocates, demonstrating that it was possible to replace a secular regime with a theocracy. Several countries, including Iran, Pakistan, Sudan, and some Nigerian states have incorporated hudud rules into their criminal justice systems, which, however, retained fundamental influences of earlier Westernizing reforms.

In practice, these changes were largely symbolic, and aside from some cases brought to trial to demonstrate that the new rules were being enforced, hudud punishments tended to fall into disuse, sometimes to be revived depending on the local political climate. The supreme courts of Sudan and Iran have rarely approved verdicts of stoning or amputation, and the supreme courts of Pakistan and Nigeria have never done so. Nonetheless, Islamization campaigns have also had repercussions in several other areas of law, leading to curtailment of rights of women and religious minorities, and in the case of Sudan contributing to the breakout of a civil war.

Advocates of Islamization have often been more concerned with ideology than traditional jurisprudence and there is no agreement among them as to what form a modern Sharia-based "Islamic state" should take. This is particularly the case for the theorists of Islamic economics and Islamic finance, who have advocated both free-market and socialist economic models. The notion of "Sharia-compliant" finance has become an active area of doctrinal innovation and its development has had a major impact on business operations around the world.

== Contemporary conflicts and applications ==
According to human rights groups, some of the classical Sharia practices involve serious violations of basic human rights, gender equality and freedom of expression, and the practices of countries governed by Sharia are criticized. The European Court of Human Rights in Strasbourg (ECtHR) ruled in several cases that Sharia is "incompatible with the fundamental principles of democracy". "Human rights concept" have been categorically excluded by the governments of countries such as Iran and Saudi Arabia under Sharia, claiming that it belongs to secular and western values, while the Cairo conference by the Organisation of Islamic Cooperation declared that human rights can only be respected if they are compatible with Islam.

Use of sharia by country: Sharia influences family and criminal laws (Libya also added the Sharia). Sharia influences family laws. Sharia plays no role in the judicial system (Sudan declares a secular state in 2020). Regional variations of sharia law apply.

The transformations of Islamic legal institutions in the modern era have had profound implications for the madhhab system. Legal practice in most of the Muslim world has come to be controlled by government policy and state law, so that the influence of the madhhabs beyond personal ritual practice depends on the status accorded to them within the national legal system. State law codification commonly utilized the methods of takhayyur (selection of rulings without restriction to a particular madhhab) and talfiq (combining parts of different rulings on the same question). Legal professionals trained in modern law schools have largely replaced traditional ulema as interpreters of the resulting laws.

Global Islamic movements have at times drawn on different madhhabs and at other times placed greater focus on the scriptural sources rather than classical jurisprudence. The Hanbali school, with its particularly strict adherence to the Quran and hadith, has inspired conservative currents of direct scriptural interpretation by the Salafi and Wahhabi movements. Other currents, such as networks of Indonesian ulema and Islamic scholars residing in Muslim-minority countries, have advanced liberal interpretations of Islamic law without focusing on traditions of a particular madhhab.

=== Muslim-majority countries ===
The legal systems of most Muslim-majority countries can be classified as either secular or mixed. Sharia plays no role in secular legal systems. In mixed legal systems, Sharia rules are allowed to influence some national laws, which are codified and may be based on European or Indian models, and the central legislative role is played by politicians and modern jurists rather than the ulema (traditional Islamic scholars).

Saudi Arabia and some other Persian Gulf states possess what may be called classical Sharia systems, where national law is largely uncodified and formally equated with Sharia, with ulema playing a decisive role in its interpretation. Iran has adopted some features of classical Sharia systems, while also maintaining characteristics of mixed systems, like codified laws and a parliament.

==== Constitutional law ====
Constitutions of many Muslim-majority countries refer to Sharia as a source or the main source of law, though these references are not in themselves indicative of how much the legal system is influenced by Sharia, and whether the influence has a traditionalist or modernist character. The same constitutions usually also refer to universal principles such as democracy and human rights, leaving it up to legislators and the judiciary to work out how these norms are to be reconciled in practice.

Conversely, some countries (e.g., Algeria), whose constitution does not mention Sharia, possess Sharia-based family laws. Nisrine Abiad identifies Bahrain, Iran, Pakistan, and Saudi Arabia as states with "strong constitutional consequences of Sharia "on the organization and functioning of power".

==== Family law ====
Except for secular systems, Muslim-majority countries possess Sharia-based laws dealing with family matters (marriage, inheritance, etc.). These laws generally reflect influence of various modern-era reforms and tend to be characterized by ambiguity, with traditional and modernist interpretations often manifesting themselves in the same country, both in legislation and court decisions. In some countries (e.g., parts of Nigeria), people can choose whether to pursue a case in a Sharia or secular court.

==== Criminal law ====
Countries in the Muslim world generally have criminal codes influenced by civil law or common law, and in some cases a combination of Western legal traditions. Saudi Arabia has never adopted a criminal code and Saudi judges still follow traditional Hanbali jurisprudence. In the course of Islamization campaigns, several countries (Libya, Pakistan, Iran, Sudan, Mauritania, and Yemen) inserted Islamic criminal laws into their penal codes, which were otherwise based on Western models. In some countries only hudud penalties were added, while others also enacted provisions for qisas (law of retaliation) and diya (monetary compensation). Iran subsequently issued a new "Islamic Penal Code".

The criminal codes of Afghanistan and United Arab Emirates contain a general provision that certain crimes are to be punished according to Islamic law, without specifying the penalties. Some Nigerian states have also enacted Islamic criminal laws. Laws in the Indonesian province of Aceh provide for application of discretionary (ta'zir) punishments for violation of Islamic norms, but explicitly exclude hudud and qisas. Brunei has been implementing a "Sharia Penal Code", which includes provisions for stoning and amputation, in stages since 2014. The countries where hudud penalties are legal do not use stoning and amputation routinely, and generally apply other punishments instead.

==== Property law ====
Sharia recognizes the concept of haqq. Haqq refers to personal rights of the individual and the right to generate and accumulate wealth. The various ways in which property can be acquired under Sharia are purchase, inheritance, bequest, physical or mental effort, diya and donations. Certain concepts relating to property under Sharia are Mulk, Waqf, Mawat and Motasarruf.

=== Court procedures ===
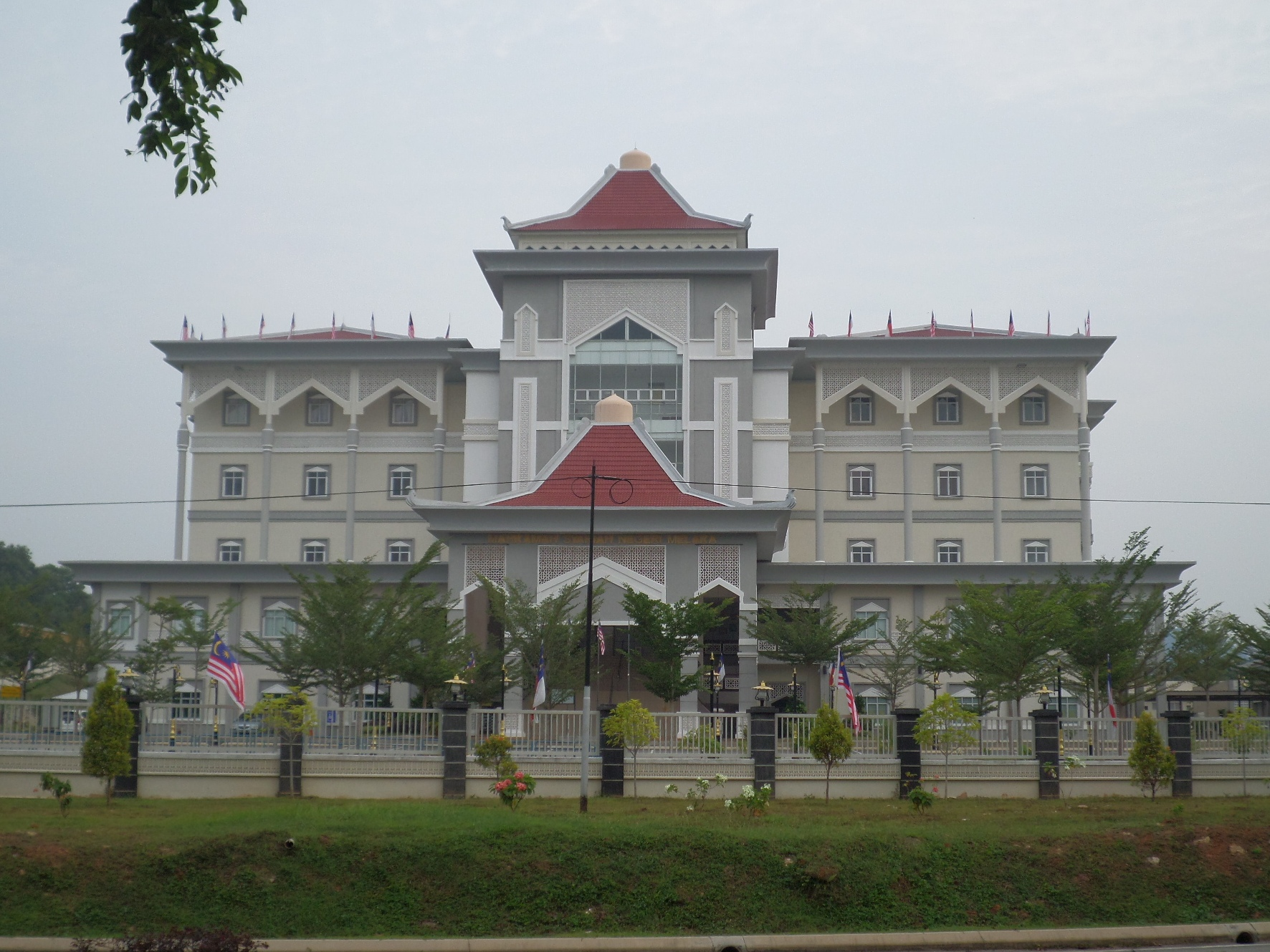
Shariah court in Malacca, Malaysia

Sharia courts traditionally do not rely on lawyers; plaintiffs and defendants represent themselves. In Saudi Arabia and Qatar, which have preserved traditional procedure in Sharia courts, trials are conducted solely by the judge, and there is no jury system. There is no pre-trial discovery process, and no cross-examination of witnesses. Unlike common law, judges' verdicts do not set binding precedents under the principle of stare decisis, and unlike civil law, Sharia is left to the interpretation in each case and has no formally codified universal statutes.

The rules of evidence in Sharia courts traditionally prioritize oral testimony, and witnesses must be Muslim. In criminal cases, women witnesses are unacceptable in stricter, traditional interpretations of Sharia, such as those found in Hanbali jurisprudence, which forms the basis of law in Saudi Arabia.

==== Evidences / testimonies ====
In Criminal cases: A confession, an oath, or the oral testimony of Muslim witnesses are the main evidence admissible in traditional sharia courts for hudud crimes, i.e., the religious crimes of adultery, fornication, rape, accusing someone of illicit sex but failing to prove it, apostasy, drinking intoxicants and theft.

According to classical jurisprudence, testimony must be from at least two free Muslim male witnesses, or one Muslim male and two Muslim females, who are not related parties and who are of sound mind and reliable character. Testimony to establish the crime of adultery, fornication or rape must be from four Muslim male witnesses, with some fiqhs allowing substitution of up to three male with six female witnesses; however, at least one must be a Muslim male.

Forensic evidence (i.e., fingerprints, ballistics, blood samples, DNA etc.) and other circumstantial evidence may likewise rejected in hudud cases in favor of eyewitnesses in some modern interpretations. In the case of regulations that were part of local Malaysian legislation that did not go into effect, this could cause severe difficulties for women plaintiffs in rape cases. In Pakistan, DNA evidence is rejected in paternity cases on the basis of legislation that favors the presumption of children's legitimacy, while in sexual assault cases DNA evidence is regarded as equivalent to expert opinion and evaluated on a case-by-case basis.

In civil cases: Quran 2:282 recommends written financial contracts with reliable witnesses, although there is dispute about equality of female testimony.

Marriage is solemnized as a written financial contract, in the presence of two Muslim male witnesses, and it includes a brideprice (Mahr) payable from a Muslim man to a Muslim woman. The brideprice is considered by a Sharia court as a form of debt. Written contracts were traditionally considered paramount in Sharia courts in the matters of dispute that are debt-related, which includes marriage contracts. Written contracts in debt-related cases, when notarized by a judge, is deemed more reliable.

In commercial and civil contracts, such as those relating to exchange of merchandise, agreement to supply or purchase goods or property, and others, oral contracts and the testimony of Muslim witnesses historically triumphed over written contracts. Islamic jurists traditionally held that written commercial contracts may be forged. Timur Kuran states that the treatment of written evidence in religious courts in Islamic regions created an incentive for opaque transactions, and the avoidance of written contracts in economic relations. This led to a continuation of a "largely oral contracting culture" in Muslim-majority nations and communities.

In lieu of written evidence, oaths are traditionally accorded much greater weight; rather than being used simply to guarantee the truth of ensuing testimony, they are themselves used as evidence. Plaintiffs lacking other evidence to support their claims may demand that defendants take an oath swearing their innocence, refusal thereof can result in a verdict for the plaintiff. Taking an oath for Muslims can be a grave act; one study of courts in Morocco found that lying litigants would often "maintain their testimony right up to the moment of oath-taking and then to stop, refuse the oath, and surrender the case." Accordingly, defendants are not routinely required to swear before testifying, which would risk casually profaning the Quran should the defendant commit perjury.

==== Diya ====
In classical jurisprudence monetary compensation for bodily harm (diya or blood money) is assessed differently for different classes of victims. For example, for Muslim women the amount was half that assessed for a Muslim man. Diya for the death of a free Muslim man is twice as high as for Jewish and Christian victims according to the Maliki and Hanbali madhhabs and three times as high according to Shafi'i rules. Several legal schools assessed diya for Magians (majus) at one-fifteenth the value of a free Muslim male.

Modern countries which incorporate classical diya rules into their legal system treat them in different ways. The Pakistan Penal Code modernized the Hanafi doctrine by eliminating distinctions between Muslims and non-Muslims. In Iran, diya for non-Muslim victims professing one of the faiths protected under the constitution (Jews, Christians, and Zoroastrians) was made equal to diya for Muslims in 2004, though according to a 2006 US State Department report, the penal code still discriminates against other religious minorities and women. According to Human Rights Watch and the US State Department, in Saudi Arabia Jewish or Christian male plaintiffs are entitled to half the amount a Muslim male would receive, while for all other non-Muslim males the proportion is one-sixteenth.

=== Role of fatwas ===
Fatwa issued 14 February 1989

I would like to inform all the intrepid Muslims in the world that the author of the book entitled The Satanic Verses, which has been compiled, printed and published in opposition to Islam, the Prophet and the Qur'an, as well as those publishers who were aware of its contents, have been declared madhur el dam [those whose blood must be shed]. I call on all zealous Muslims to execute them quickly, wherever they find them, so that no-one will dare to insult Islam again. Whoever is killed in this path will be regarded as a martyr.

The spread of codified state laws and Western-style legal education in the modern Muslim world has displaced traditional muftis from their historical role of clarifying and elaborating the laws applied in courts. Instead, fatwas have increasingly served to advise the general public on other aspects of Sharia, particularly questions regarding religious rituals and everyday life. Modern fatwas deal with topics as diverse as insurance, sex-change operations, moon exploration and beer drinking.

Most Muslim-majority states have established national organizations devoted to issuing fatwas, and these organizations to a considerable extent replaced independent muftis as religious guides for the general population. State-employed muftis generally promote a vision of Islam that is compatible with state law of their country.

Modern public and political fatwas have addressed and sometimes sparked controversies in the Muslim world and beyond. Ayatollah Khomeini's proclamation condemning Salman Rushdie to death for his novel The Satanic Verses is credited with bringing the notion of fatwa to world's attention, although some scholars have argued that it did not qualify as one. (Note: Khomeini himself did not call this proclamation a fatwa, and in Islamic legal theory only a court can decide whether an accused is guilty. However, after the proclamation was presented as a fatwa in Western press, this characterization was widely accepted by both its critics and its supporters.) Together with later militant fatwas, it has contributed to the popular misconception of the fatwa as a religious death warrant.

Modern fatwas have been marked by an increased reliance on the process of ijtihad, i.e. deriving legal rulings based on an independent analysis rather than conformity with the opinions of earlier legal authorities (taqlid), and some of them are issued by individuals who do not possess the qualifications traditionally required of a mufti. The most notorious examples are the fatwas of militant extremists. When Osama bin Laden and his associates issued a fatwa in 1998 proclaiming "jihad against Jews and Crusaders", many Islamic jurists, in addition to denouncing its content, stressed that bin Laden was not qualified to either issue a fatwa or proclaim a jihad. New forms of ijtihad have also given rise to fatwas that support such notions as gender equality and banking interest, which are at variance with classical jurisprudence.

In the internet age, a large number of websites provide fatwas in response to queries from around the world, in addition to radio shows and satellite television programs offering call-in fatwas. Erroneous and sometimes bizarre fatwas issued by unqualified or eccentric individuals in recent times have sometimes given rise to complaints about a "chaos" in the modern practice of issuing fatwas. There exists no international Islamic authority to settle differences in interpretation of Islamic law. An International Islamic Fiqh Academy was created by the Organisation of Islamic Cooperation, but its legal opinions are not binding. The vast amount of fatwas produced in the modern world attests to the importance of Islamic authenticity to many Muslims. However, there is little research available to indicate to what extent Muslims acknowledge the authority of different muftis or heed their rulings in real life.

=== Role of hisba ===
The classical doctrine of hisba, associated with the Quranic injunction of enjoining good and forbidding wrong, refers to the duty of Muslims to promote moral rectitude and intervene when another Muslim is acting wrongly. Historically, its legal implementation was entrusted to a public official called muhtasib (market inspector), who was charged with preventing fraud, disturbance of public order and infractions against public morality.

This office disappeared in the modern era everywhere in the Muslim world, but it was revived in Arabia by the first Saudi state, and later instituted as a government committee responsible for supervising markets and public order. It has been aided by volunteers enforcing attendance of daily prayers, gender segregation in public places, and a conservative notion of hijab. Committee officers were authorized to detain violators before a 2016 reform.

With the rising international influence of Wahhabism, the conception of hisba as an individual obligation to police religious observance has become more widespread, which led to the appearance of activists around the world who urge fellow Muslims to observe Islamic rituals, dress code, and other aspects of Sharia.

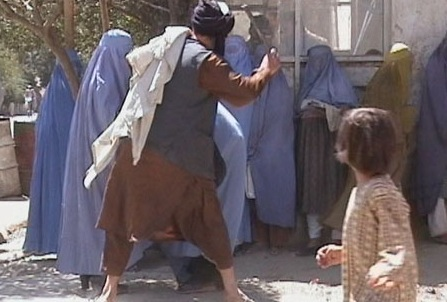
Taliban religious police beating a woman in Kabul on 26 August 2001, as reported by RAWA, for opening her burqa (face)

In Iran, hisba was enshrined in the constitution after the 1979 Revolution as a "universal and reciprocal duty", incumbent upon both the government and the people. Its implementation has been carried out by official committees as well as volunteer forces (basij).

Elsewhere, policing of various interpretations of Sharia-based public morality has been carried out by the Kano State Hisbah Corps in the Nigerian state of Kano, by Wilayatul Hisbah in the Aceh province of Indonesia, by the Committee for the Propagation of Virtue and the Prevention of Vice in the Gaza Strip, and by the Taliban during their 1996–2001 and 2021–present rule of Afghanistan. Religious police organizations tend to have support from conservative currents of public opinion, but their activities are often disliked by other segments of the population, especially liberals, urban women, and younger people.

In Egypt, a law based on the doctrine of hisba had for a time allowed a Muslim to sue another Muslim over beliefs that may harm society, though because of abuses it has been amended so that only the state prosecutor may bring suit based on private requests. Before the amendment was passed, a hisba suit brought by a group of Islamists against the liberal theologian Nasr Abu Zayd on charges of apostasy led to the annulment of his marriage. The law was also invoked in an unsuccessful blasphemy suit against the feminist author Nawal El Saadawi. Hisba has also been invoked in several Muslim-majority countries as rationale for blocking pornographic content on the internet and for other forms of faith-based censorship.

=== Muslim-minority countries ===
Sharia also plays a role beyond religious rituals and personal ethics in some countries with Muslim minorities. For example, in Israel Sharia-based family laws are administered for the Muslim population by the Ministry of Justice through the Sharia Courts. In India, the Muslim Personal Law (Shariat) Application Act provides for the use of Islamic law for Muslims in several areas, mainly related to family law. In England, the Muslim Arbitration Tribunal makes use of Sharia family law to settle disputes, though this limited adoption of Sharia is controversial.

== Communal support and opposition ==
=== Support ===
A 2013 survey based on interviews of 38,000 Muslims, randomly selected from urban and rural parts in 39 countries using area probability designs, by the Pew Forum on Religion and Public Life found that a majority—in some cases "overwhelming" majority—of Muslims in a number of countries support making "Sharia" or "Islamic law" the law of the land, including Afghanistan (99%), Iraq (91%), Niger (86%), Malaysia (86%), Pakistan (84%), Morocco (83%), Bangladesh (82%), Egypt (74%), Indonesia (72%), Jordan (71%), Uganda (66%), Ethiopia (65%), Mali (63%), Ghana (58%), and Tunisia (56%).

In Muslim regions of Southern-Eastern Europe and Central Asia, the support is less than 50%: Russia (42%), Kyrgyzstan (35%), Tajikistan (27%), Kosovo (20%), Albania (12%), Turkey (12%), Kazakhstan (10%), Azerbaijan (8%). Regional averages of support were 84% in South Asia, 77% in Southeast Asia, 74% in the Middle-East/North Africa, 64%, in Sub-Saharan Africa, 18% in Southern-Eastern Europe, and 12% in Central Asia .

However, while most of those who support implementation of Sharia favor using it in family and property disputes, fewer supported application of severe punishments such as whippings and cutting off hands, and interpretations of some aspects differed widely. According to the Pew poll, among Muslims who support making Sharia the law of the land, most do not believe that it should be applied to non-Muslims. In the Muslim-majority countries surveyed this proportion varied between 74% (of 74% in Egypt) and 19% (of 10% in Kazakhstan), as percentage of those who favored making Sharia the law of the land.

In all of the countries surveyed, respondents were more likely to define Sharia as "the revealed word of God" rather than as "a body of law developed by men based on the word of God". In analyzing the poll, Amaney Jamal has argued that there is no single, shared understanding of the notions "Sharia" and "Islamic law" among the respondents. In particular, in countries where Muslim citizens have little experience with rigid application of Sharia-based state laws, these notions tend to be more associated with Islamic ideals like equality and social justice than with prohibitions. Other polls have indicated that for Egyptians, the word "Sharia" is associated with notions of political, social and gender justice.

In 2008, Rowan Williams, the Archbishop of Canterbury, has suggested that Islamic and Orthodox Jewish courts should be integrated into the British legal system alongside ecclesiastical courts to handle marriage and divorce, subject to agreement of all parties and strict requirements for protection of equal rights for women. His reference to the Sharia sparked a controversy. Later that year, Nicholas Phillips, then Lord Chief Justice of England and Wales, stated that there was "no reason why Sharia principles [...] should not be the basis for mediation or other forms of alternative dispute resolution." A 2008 YouGov poll in the United Kingdom found 40% of Muslim students interviewed supported the introduction of Sharia into British law for Muslims. Michael Broyde, professor of law at Emory University specializing in alternative dispute resolution and Jewish law, has argued that Sharia courts can be integrated into the American religious arbitration system, provided that they adopt appropriate institutional requirements as American rabbinical courts have done.

=== Opposition ===
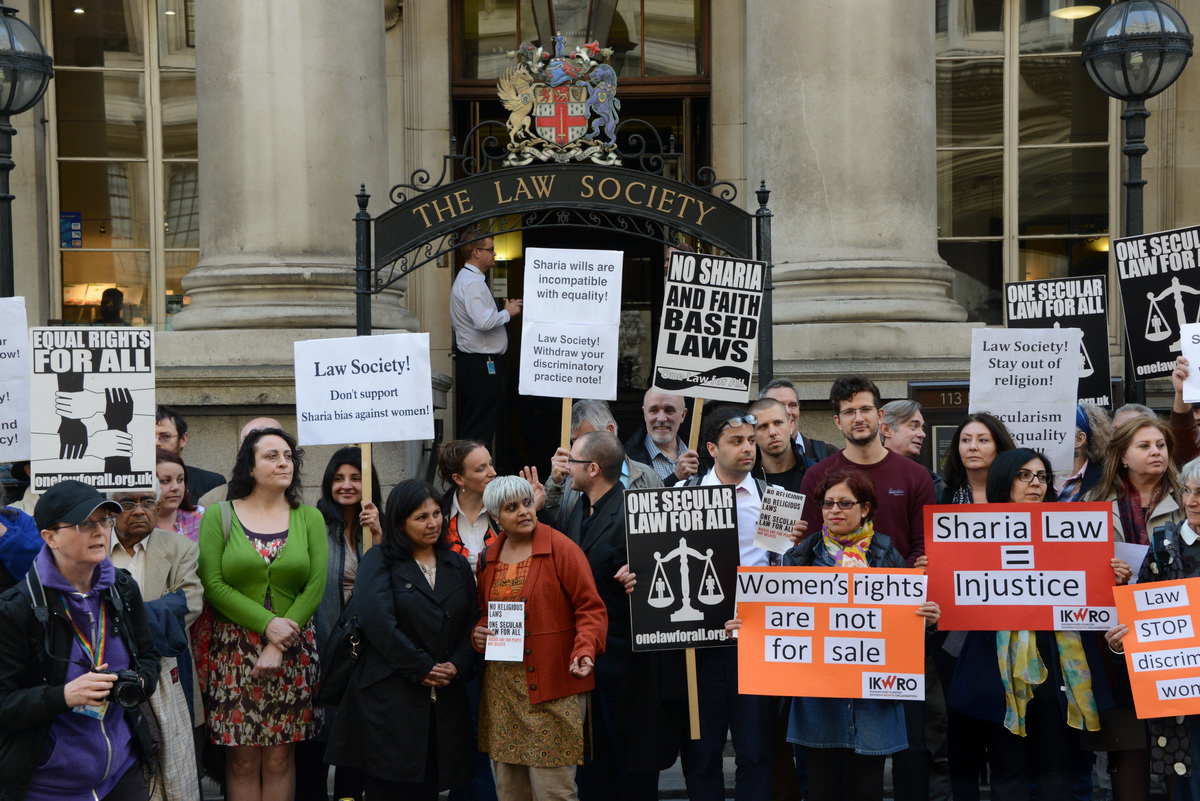
Protest against Sharia in the United Kingdom (2014)

In the Western world, Sharia has been called a source of "hysteria", "more controversial than ever", the one aspect of Islam that inspires "particular dread". On the Internet, "dozens of self-styled counter-jihadis" emerged to campaign against Sharia law, describing it in strict interpretations resembling those of Salafi Muslims. Also, fear of Sharia law and of the ideology of extremism among Muslims as well as certain congregations donating money to terrorist organizations within the Muslim community reportedly spread to mainstream conservative Republicans in the United States.

Former House Speaker Newt Gingrich won ovations calling for a federal ban on Sharia law. The issue of "liberty versus Sharia" was called a "momentous civilisational debate" by right-wing pundit Diana West. In 2008 in Britain, the future Prime Minister (David Cameron) declared his opposition to "any expansion of Sharia law in the UK." In Germany, in 2014, the Interior Minister (Thomas de Maizière) told a newspaper (Bild), "Sharia law is not tolerated on German soil."

Some countries and jurisdictions have explicit bans on Sharia law. In Canada, for example, sharia law has been explicitly banned in Quebec by a 2005 unanimous vote of the National Assembly, while the province of Ontario allows family law disputes to be arbitrated only under Ontario law. In the U.S., opponents of Sharia have sought to ban it from being considered in courts, where it has been routinely used alongside traditional Jewish and Catholic laws to decide legal, business, and family disputes subject to contracts drafted with reference to such laws, as long as they do not violate secular law or the U.S. constitution. After failing to gather support for a federal law making observing Sharia a felony punishable by up to 20 years in prison, anti-Sharia activists have focused on state legislatures.

By 2014, bills aimed against use of Sharia have been introduced in 34 states and passed in 11. A notable example of this would be 2010 Oklahoma State Question 755, which sought to permanently ban the use of Sharia law in courts. While approved by voters, the Tenth Circuit Court of Appeals placed an injunction on the law. Citing the unconstitutionality of the law's impartial focus on a specific religion, the law was struck down and never took effect. These bills have generally referred to banning foreign or religious law in order to thwart legal challenges.

According to Jan Michiel Otto, Professor of Law and Governance in Developing Countries at Leiden University, "[a]nthropological research shows that people in local communities often do not distinguish clearly whether and to what extent their norms and practices are based on local tradition, tribal custom, or religion. Those who adhere to a confrontational view of Sharia tend to ascribe many undesirable practices to Sharia and religion overlooking custom and culture, even if high-ranking religious authorities have stated the opposite".

== Contemporary theoretical debates ==
=== Compatibility with democracy ===
It has been argued that the extent to which Sharia is compatible with democracy depends on how it is culturally interpreted, with a cultural position that Sharia represents the human attempt to interpret God's message associated with a greater preference for democracy than an Islamist interpretation that Sharia law is the literal word of God.

==== General Muslim views ====
Scholars John Esposito and Natana J. DeLong-Bas distinguish four attitudes toward Sharia and democracy prominent among contemporary Muslims:

- Advocacy of democratic ideas, often accompanied by a belief that they are compatible with Islam, which can play a public role within a democratic system, as exemplified by many protestors who took part in the Arab Spring uprisings;
- Support for democratic procedures such as elections, combined with religious or moral objections toward some aspects of Western democracy seen as incompatible with Sharia, as exemplified by Islamic scholars like Yusuf al-Qaradawi;
- Rejection of democracy as a Western import and advocacy of traditional Islamic institutions, such as shura (consultation) and ijma (consensus), as exemplified by supporters of absolute monarchy and radical Islamist movements;
- Belief that democracy requires restricting religion to private life: a view held by a minority in the Muslim world.

According to Polls conducted by Gallup and Pew Research Center in Muslim-majority countries, most Muslims see no contradiction between democratic values and religious principles, desiring neither theocracy nor a secular democracy but rather a political model where democratic institutions and values can coexist with the values and principles of Sharia.

==== Islamic political theories ====
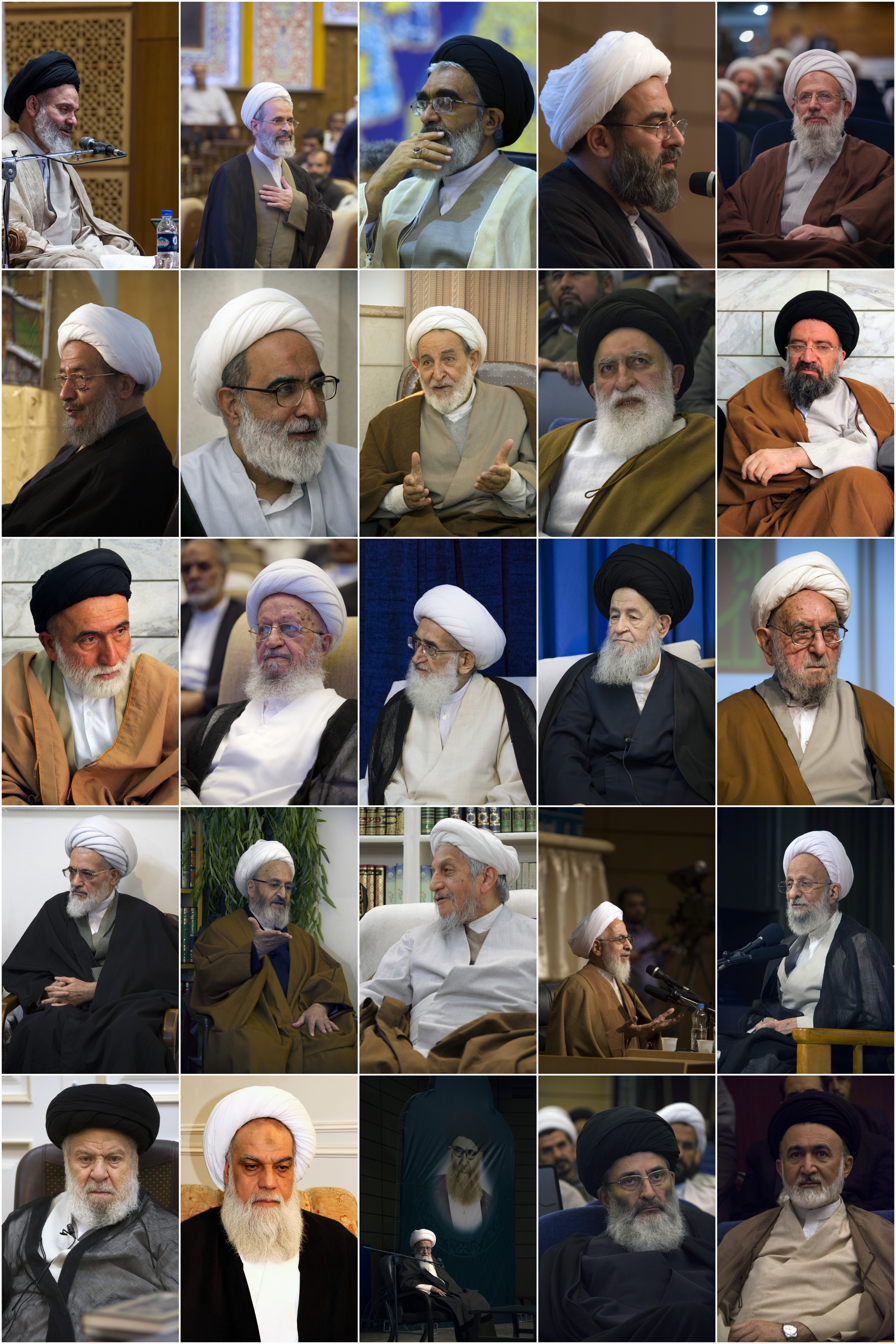
Grand Ayatollahs of Qom, Iran; Religious leaders who have the authority to interpret Sharia sources in Shia Islam used assertive names and titles such as Ruhollah, Ayatollah, Hujjat al-Islam, which directly connect their identities to Allah or Islam, and gained tutelage over people and the administration.

Muslih and Browers identify three major perspectives on democracy among prominent Muslim thinkers who have sought to develop modern, distinctly Islamic theories of socio-political organization conforming to Islamic values and law:

- The rejectionist Islamic view, elaborated by Sayyid Qutb and Abul A'la Maududi, condemns imitation of foreign ideas, distinguishing Western democracy and the Islamic doctrine of shura (consultation between ruler and ruled). This perspective, which stresses the comprehensive implementation of Sharia, was widespread in the 1970s and 1980s among various movements seeking to establish an Islamic state, but its popularity has diminished in recent years.
- The moderate Islamic view stresses the concepts of maslaha (public interest), ʿadl (justice), and shura. Islamic leaders are considered to uphold justice if they promote public interest, as defined through shura. In this view, shura provides the basis for representative government institutions that are similar to Western democracy but reflect Islamic rather than Western values. Hasan al-Turabi, Rashid al-Ghannushi, and Yusuf al-Qaradawi have advocated different forms of this view.
- The liberal Islamic view is influenced by Muhammad Abduh's emphasis on the role of reason in understanding religion. It stresses democratic principles based on pluralism and freedom of thought. Authors like Fahmi Huwaidi and Tariq al-Bishri have constructed Islamic justifications for full citizenship of non-Muslims in an Islamic state by drawing on early Islamic texts. Others, like Mohammed Arkoun and Nasr Hamid Abu Zayd, have justified pluralism and freedom through non-literalist approaches to textual interpretation. Abdolkarim Soroush has argued for a "religious democracy" based on religious thought that is democratic, tolerant, and just. Islamic liberals argue for the necessity of constant reexamination of religious understanding, which can only be done in a democratic context.

==== European Court of Human Rights ====
In 1998, the Constitutional Court of Turkey banned and dissolved Turkey's Refah Party over its announced intention to introduce Sharia-based laws, ruling that it would change Turkey's secular order and undermine democracy. On appeal by Refah the European Court of Human Rights determined that "sharia is incompatible with the fundamental principles of democracy". Refah's Sharia-based notion of a "plurality of legal systems, grounded on religion" was ruled to contravene the European Convention for the Protection of Human Rights and Fundamental Freedoms. It was determined that it would "do away with the State's role as the guarantor of individual rights and freedoms" and "infringe the principle of non-discrimination between individuals as regards their enjoyment of public freedoms, which is one of the fundamental principles of democracy".

In an analysis, Maurits S. Berger found the ruling to be "nebulous" and surprising from a legal point of view, since the Court neglected to define what it meant by "Sharia" and would not, for example, be expected to regard Sharia rules for Islamic rituals as contravening European human rights values. Kevin Boyle also criticized the decision for not distinguishing between extremist and mainstream interpretations of Islam and implying that peaceful advocacy of Islamic doctrines ("an attitude which fails to respect [the principle of secularism]") is not protected by the European Convention provisions for freedom of religion.

=== Compatibility with freedom of religion ===
==== Apostasy ====
Countries that criminalize religious conversion as of 2020. Some Muslim-majority countries impose the death penalty or a prison sentence for apostasy away from Islam or ban non-Muslims from proselytizing.

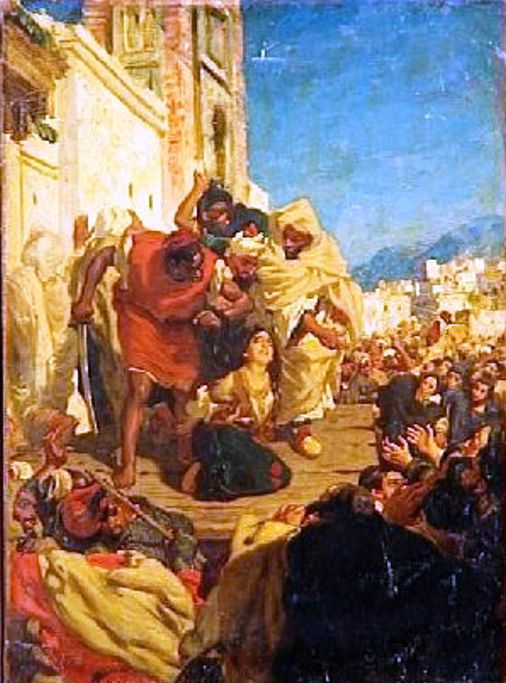
Execution of a Moroccan Jewish woman (Sol Hachuel) on the grounds of leaving Islam (apostasy), painting by Alfred Dehodencq

According to Islam, religious conversion away from Islam (apostasy from Islam) is a sin, while "there is no compulsion in religion". A number of liberal and progressive Islamic scholars have argued that apostasy should not be viewed as a crime. Others argue that the death penalty is an inappropriate punishment, inconsistent with the Qur'anic verses such as Al-Baqara 256 containing "no compulsion in religion"; or that it was a man-made rule enacted in the early Islamic community to prevent and punish the equivalent of desertion or treason. According to Khaled Abou El Fadl, some Muslims do not believe that apostasy requires punishment. Typically there is a waiting period to allow time to repent and to return to Islam.

Early Islamic jurists set the standard for apostasy from Islam so high that practically no apostasy verdict could be passed before the 11th century, but later jurists lowered the bar for applying the death penalty, allowing judges to interpret the apostasy law in different ways, which they did sometimes leniently and sometimes strictly. In the late 19th century, criminal penalties for apostasy fell into disuse, although civil penalties were still applied. Wael Hallaq writes that "[in] a culture whose lynchpin is religion, religious principles and religious morality, apostasy is in some way equivalent to high treason in the modern nation-state". Some Islamic jurists continue to regard apostasy as a crime deserving the death penalty. Some Sharia interpreters believe apostasy should be enforced only if apostasy becomes a mechanism of public disobedience and disorder (fitna). (Note: According to the interpretation of Turkish Muslim scholar Ahmet Albayrak regarding apostasy from Islam as a form of wrongdoing, punishment for leaving Islam is not a sign of intolerance towards other religions, and it is not aimed at one's freedom to leave Islam and to choose a different faith. In his opinion, it is more correct to say that the punishment is imposed as a safety precaution when conditions warrant the imposition of it; for example, the punishment is imposed if apostasy from Islam becomes a mechanism of public disobedience and disorder (fitna).)

Twenty-three Muslim-majority countries, as of 2013, penalized apostasy from Islam through their criminal laws. As of 2014, apostasy from Islam was a capital offense in Afghanistan, Brunei, Mauritania, Qatar, Saudi Arabia, Sudan, the United Arab Emirates, and Yemen. In other countries, Sharia courts could use family laws to void the Muslim apostate's marriage and to deny child-custody rights as well as inheritance rights. In the years 1985–2006, four individuals were legally executed for apostasy from Islam: "one in Sudan in 1985; two in Iran, in 1989 and 1998; and one in Saudi Arabia in 1992". While modern states have rarely prosecuted apostasy, Islamists have tended to exploit apostasy for political gain. In a 2008–2012 Pew Research Center poll, public support for capital punishment for apostasy among Muslims ranged from 78% in Afghanistan to less than 1% in Kazakhstan, reaching over 50% in 6 of the 20 countries surveyed. Some Sharia courts have limited the freedom of religion for Muslims.

The death penalty or other punishment for apostasy in Islam is a violation of universal human rights, and an issue of freedom of religion and conscience.

=== Compatibility with human rights ===
Governments of several predominantly Muslim countries have criticized the Universal Declaration of Human Rights (UDHR) for its perceived failure to take into account the cultural and religious context of non-Western countries. Iran declared in the UN assembly that UDHR was "a secular understanding of the Judeo-Christian tradition", which could not be implemented by Muslims without trespassing the Islamic law. Islamic scholars and Islamist political parties consider 'universal human rights' arguments as the imposition of a non-Muslim culture on Muslim people, a disrespect of customary cultural practices and Islam. In 1990, the Organisation of Islamic Cooperation, a group representing all Muslim-majority nations, met in Cairo to respond to the UDHR, then adopted the Cairo Declaration on Human Rights in Islam.

Ann Elizabeth Mayer points to notable absences from the Cairo Declaration: provisions for democratic principles, protection for religious freedom, freedom of association, and freedom of the press, as well as equality in rights and equal protection under the law. Article 24 of the Cairo declaration states that "all the rights and freedoms stipulated in this Declaration are subject to the Islamic shari'a".

In 2009, the journal Free Inquiry summarized the criticism of the Cairo Declaration in an editorial: "We are deeply concerned with the changes to the Universal Declaration of Human Rights by a coalition of Islamic states within the United Nations that wishes to prohibit any criticism of religion and would thus protect Islam's limited view of human rights. In view of the conditions inside the Islamic Republic of Iran, Egypt, Pakistan, Saudi Arabia, Sudan, Syria, Bangladesh, Iraq, and Afghanistan, we should expect that at the top of their human rights agenda would be to rectify the legal inequality of women, the suppression of political dissent, the curtailment of free expression, the persecution of ethnic minorities and religious dissenters—in short, protecting their citizens from egregious human rights violations. Instead, they are worrying about protecting Islam".

H. Patrick Glenn states that Sharia is structured around the concept of mutual obligations of a collective, and it considers individual human rights as potentially disruptive and unnecessary to its revealed code of mutual obligations. In giving priority to this religious collective rather than individual liberty, Islamic law justifies the formal inequality of individuals (women and non-Islamic people). Bassam Tibi states that the Sharia framework and human rights are incompatible. Abdel al-Hakeem Carney, in contrast, states that Sharia is misunderstood from a failure to distinguish Sharia from siyasah (politics).

==== LGBTQ rights ====
Homosexual intercourse illegal: Death penalty Death penalty on books but not applied Up to life in prison Imprisonment Prison on books but not enforced

Homosexual intercourse is illegal in classical Sharia, with different penalties, including capital punishment, stipulated depending on the situation and legal school. In pre-modern Islam, the penalties prescribed for homosexual acts were "to a large extent theoretical" according to the Encyclopaedia of Islam, owing in part to stringent procedural requirements for their harsher (hudud) forms and in part to prevailing social tolerance toward same-sex relationships.

Historical instances of prosecution for homosexual acts are rare, and those which followed Sharia rules are even rarer. Public attitudes toward homosexuality in the Muslim world turned more negative starting from the 19th century through the gradual spread of Islamic fundamentalist movements such as Salafism and Wahhabism, and under the influence of sexual notions prevalent in Europe at that time. A number of Muslim-majority countries have retained criminal penalties for homosexual acts enacted under colonial rule. In recent decades, prejudice against LGBT individuals in the Muslim world has been exacerbated by increasingly conservative attitudes and the rise of Islamist movements, resulting in Sharia-based penalties enacted in several countries.

The death penalty for homosexual acts is currently a legal punishment in Brunei, Iran, Mauritania, some northern states in Nigeria, Pakistan, Qatar, Saudi Arabia, parts of Somalia, and Yemen, all of which have Sharia-based criminal laws. It is unclear whether the laws of Afghanistan and United Arab Emirates provide for the death penalty for gay sex, as they have never been carried out. Criminalization of consensual homosexual acts and especially making them liable to capital punishment has been condemned by international rights groups. According to polls, the level of social acceptance for homosexuality ranges from 52% among Muslims in the U.S. to less than 10% in a number of Muslim-majority nations.

==== Women ====
A "cariye" or Ottoman concubine, painting by Gustav Richter (1823–1884)

===== Personal status and child marriage =====
Sharia is the basis for personal status laws in most Islamic-majority nations. These personal status laws determine rights of women in matters of marriage, divorce, and child custody. A 2011 UNICEF report mentions that Sharia law provisions differ for women in financial matters from general human rights provisions. In many countries, in legal proceedings relating to Sharia-based personal status law, in financial cases, a woman's testimony is worth half of a man's before a court.

The 1917 codification of Islamic family law in the Ottoman Empire distinguished between the age of competence for marriage, which was set at 18 for boys and 17 for girls, and the minimum age for marriage, which followed the traditional Hanafi limits of 12 for boys and 9 for girls. Marriage below the age of competence was permissible only if proof of sexual maturity was accepted in court, while marriage under the minimum age was forbidden.

During the 20th century, most countries in the Middle East followed the Ottoman precedent in defining the age of competence while raising the minimum age to 15 or 16 for boys and 13–16 for girls. Marriage below the age of competence is subject to approval by a judge and the legal guardian of the adolescent. Egypt diverged from this pattern by setting the age limits of 18 for boys and 16 for girls, without a distinction between competence for marriage and minimum age.

===== Property rights =====
Islamic law granted Muslim women certain legal rights, such as property rights which women in the West did not possess until "comparatively recent times". Starting with the 20th century, Western legal systems evolved to expand women's rights, but women's rights in the Muslim world have to varying degree remained tied to the Quran, hadiths and their traditional interpretations by Islamic jurists. Sharia grants women the right to inherit property from other family members, and these rights are detailed in the Quran. A woman's inheritance can be unequal if she inherits from her father, as daughters inherit half as much as their brothers.^{[Quran 4:11]}

===== Domestic violence =====
Jonathan A.C. Brown says:

The vast majority of the ulama across the Sunni schools of law inherited the Prophet's unease over domestic violence and placed further restrictions on the evident meaning of the 'Wife Beating Verse'. A leading Meccan scholar from the second generation of Muslims, Ata' bin Abi Rabah, counseled a husband not to beat his wife even if she ignored him but rather to express his anger in some other way. Darimi, a teacher of both Tirmidhi and Muslim bin Hajjaj as well as a leading early scholar in Iran, collected all the Hadiths showing Muhammad's disapproval of beating in a chapter entitled 'The Prohibition on Striking Women'. A thirteenth-century scholar from Granada, Ibn Faras, notes that one camp of ulama had staked out a stance forbidding striking a wife altogether, declaring it contrary to the Prophet's example and denying the authenticity of any Hadiths that seemed to permit beating. Even Ibn Hajar, the pillar of late medieval Sunni Hadith scholarship, concludes that, contrary to what seems to be an explicit command in the Qur'an, the Hadiths of the Prophet leave no doubt that striking one's wife to discipline her actually falls under the Shariah ruling of 'strongly disliked' or 'disliked verging on prohibited'.

The Surah 4:34, in the Quran, has been debated for domestic violence and also has been subject to varied interpretations. According to some interpretations, Sharia condones certain forms of domestic violence against women, when a husband suspects nushuz (disobedience, disloyalty, rebellion, ill conduct) in his wife only after admonishing and staying away from the bed does not work. These interpretations have been criticized as inconsistent with women's rights in domestic abuse cases. Musawah, CEDAW, KAFA and other organizations have proposed ways to modify Sharia-inspired laws to improve women's rights in Muslim-majority nations, including women's rights in domestic abuse cases.

Others believe that wife-beating is not consistent with a more modernist perspective of the Quran. Many Imams and scholars who learned Shariah in traditional Islamic seminaries object to the misuse of this verse to justify domestic violence. Muslims for White Ribbon Campaign was launched in 2010 with Imams and Muslim leaders committing to join with others to work to end violence against women. Khutbah campaigns were held in many parts of the world to speak out against domestic violence and encourage Muslim congregants to eradicate domestic abuse.

===== Rape =====
Rape is considered a serious crime in the Sharia law since the Islamic prophet Muhammad ordered rapists to be punished by stoning. The terms ghasaba and ightasaba have been used by traditional jurists when discussing sexual assault and its punishment. Imam Al-Shāfi'ī defined rape as: "Forcing a woman to commit zinā against her will". To the Ḥanafis, illegal intercourse is considered rape when there is no consent and no deliberate action from the victim. In Mālik's view, rape refers to any kind of unlawful sexual intercourse by usurpation and without consent. This includes instances when the condition of the victims prevents them from expressing their resistance, such as insanity, sleep, or being underage. The Hanbalites, similar to the Mālikites, consider the use of any kind of force as a denial of consent from the victim. The threat of starvation or suffering the cold of winter is also regarded as being against one's will.

=== Slavery ===
Sharia authorized the institution of slavery, using the words abd (slave) and the phrase ma malakat aymanukum ("that which your right hand owns") to refer to women slaves seized as captives of war. Under Islamic law, Muslim men could have sexual relations with female captives and slaves. Sharia, in Islam's history, provided a religious foundation for enslaving non-Muslim women and men but allowed for the manumission of slaves. A slave woman who bore a child to her Muslim master (umm al-walad) could not be sold, becoming legally free upon her master's death and the child was considered free and a legitimate heir of the father.

=== Terrorism ===
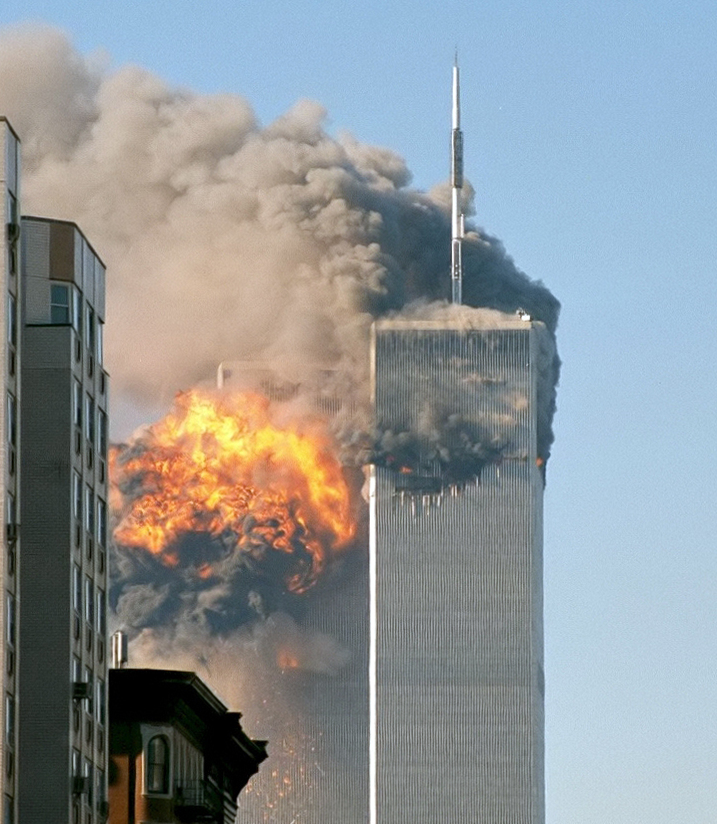
Al-Qaeda ideologues have used their interpretation of Sharia to justify terrorist attacks.

Some extremists have used their interpretation of Islamic scriptures and Sharia, in particular the doctrine of jihad, to justify acts of war and terror against Muslim as well as non-Muslim individuals and governments. The expert on terrorism Rachel Ehrenfeld wrote that the "Sharia's finance (Islamic banking) is a new weapon in the arsenal of what might be termed fifth-generation warfare (5GW)". However, Sharia-compliant financing actually requires a person to stay away from weapons manufacturing.

In classical fiqh, the term jihad refers to armed struggle against oppressors. Classical jurists developed an elaborate set of rules pertaining to jihad, including prohibitions on harming those who are not engaged in combat. According to Bernard Lewis, "[a]t no time did the classical jurists offer any approval or legitimacy to what we nowadays call terrorism" and the terrorist practice of suicide bombing "has no justification in terms of Islamic theology, law or tradition". In the modern era the notion of jihad has lost its jurisprudential relevance and instead gave rise to an ideological and political discourse. While modernist Islamic scholars have emphasized defensive and non-military aspects of jihad, some radicals have advanced aggressive interpretations that go beyond the classical theory. For al-Qaeda ideologues, in jihad, all means are legitimate, including targeting Muslim non-combatants and the mass killing of non-Muslim civilians.

Some modern ulema, such as Yusuf al-Qaradawi and Sulaiman Al-Alwan, have supported attacks against Israeli army reservists and hence should be considered soldiers, while Hamid bin Abdallah al-Ali declared that suicide attacks in Chechnya were justified as a "sacrifice". Many prominent Islamic scholars, including al-Qaradawi himself, have issued condemnations of terrorism in general terms. For example, Abdul-Aziz ibn Abdullah Al ash-Sheikh, the Grand Mufti of Saudi Arabia has stated that "terrorizing innocent people [...] constitute[s] a form of injustice that cannot be tolerated by Islam", while Muhammad Sayyid Tantawy, Grand Imam of al-Azhar and former Grand Mufti of Egypt has stated that "attacking innocent people is not courageous; it is stupid and will be punished on the Day of Judgment".

=== Blasphemy ===
Blasphemy laws and penalties by jurisdiction: Death sentences Prison sentences Fines, other restrictions, or unknown penalty Blasphemy is a common law offence Blasphemy laws repealed No blasphemy laws

In classical fiqh, blasphemy refers to any form of cursing, questioning, or annoying God, Muhammad or anything considered sacred in Islam, including denying one of the Islamic prophets or scriptures, insulting an angel or refusing to accept a religious commandment. Jurists of different schools prescribed different punishments for blasphemy against Islam by Muslims and non-Muslims, ranging from imprisonment or fines to the death penalty. In some cases, Sharia allows non-Muslims to escape death by converting and becoming a devout follower of Islam. In the modern Muslim world, the laws pertaining to blasphemy vary by country, and some countries prescribe punishments consisting of fines, imprisonment, flogging, hanging, or beheading.

Blasphemy laws were rarely enforced in pre-modern Islamic societies, but in the modern era, some states and radical groups have used charges of blasphemy to burnish their religious credentials and gain popular support at the expense of liberal Muslim intellectuals and religious minorities.

Blasphemy, as interpreted under Sharia, is controversial. Representatives of the Organisation of Islamic Cooperation have petitioned the United Nations to condemn "defamation of religions" because "Unrestricted and disrespectful freedom of opinion creates hatred and is contrary to the spirit of peaceful dialogue". The Cairo Declaration on Human Rights in Islam subjects free speech to unspecified Sharia restrictions: Article 22(a) of the Declaration states that "Everyone shall have the right to express his opinion freely in such manner as would not be contrary to the principles of the Shariah." Others, in contrast, consider blasphemy laws to violate freedom of speech, stating that freedom of expression is essential to empowering both Muslims and non-Muslims, and point to the abuse of blasphemy laws in prosecuting members of religious minorities, political opponents, and settling personal scores.

In Pakistan, blasphemy laws have been used to convict more than a thousand people, about half of them Ahmadis and Christians. While none have been legally executed, two Pakistani politicians, Shahbaz Bhatti and Salmaan Taseer, have been assassinated over their criticism of the blasphemy laws. The Pakistani blasphemy laws are based upon colonial-era legislation, which made it a "crime to disturb a religious assembly, trespass on burial grounds, insult religious beliefs or intentionally destroy or defile a place or an object of worship", with these laws being modified between 1980 and 1986 by the military government of General Zia-ul Haq to make them more severe. A number of clauses were added by the government in order to "Islamicise" the laws and deny the Muslim character of the Ahmadi minority.

== Comparison with other legal systems ==
Legal systems of the world. Sharia in green, civil law in blue, common law in red.

=== Jewish law ===
Islamic legal tradition has a number of parallels with Judaism. In both religions, revealed law holds a central place, in contrast to Christianity which does not possess a body of revealed law, and where theology rather than law is considered to be the principal field of religious study.

Both Islamic and Jewish law (Halakha) are derived from formal textual revelations (Quran and Pentateuch) as well as less formal, orally transmitted prophetic traditions (hadith and mishna). According to some scholars, the words sharia and halakha both mean literally "the path to follow". The fiqh literature parallels rabbinical law developed in the Talmud, with fatwas being analogous to rabbinic responsa.

However, the emphasis on qiyas in classical Sunni legal theory is both more explicitly permissive than Talmudic law with respect to authorizing individual reason as a source of law, and more implicitly restrictive, in excluding other, unauthorized forms of reasoning.

=== Common law systems ===
Early Islamic law developed a number of legal concepts that anticipated similar such concepts that later appeared in English common law. Similarities exist between the royal English contract protected by the action of debt and the Islamic Aqd, between the English assize of novel disseisin and the Islamic Istihqaq, and between the English jury and the Islamic Lafif in classical Maliki jurisprudence. The law schools known as Inns of Court also parallel Madrasahs. The methodology of legal precedent and reasoning by analogy (Qiyas) are also similar in both the Islamic and common law systems, as are the English trust and agency institutions to the Islamic Waqf and Hawala institutions, respectively.

Elements of Islamic law also have other parallels in Western legal systems. For example, the influence of Islam on the development of an international law of the sea can be discerned alongside that of the Roman influence. George Makdisi has argued that the madrasa system of attestation paralleled the legal scholastic system in the West, which gave rise to the modern university system. The triple status of faqih ("master of law"), mufti ("professor of legal opinions") and mudarris ("teacher"), conferred by the classical Islamic legal degree, had its equivalents in the medieval Latin terms magister, professor and doctor, respectively, although they all came to be used synonymously in both East and West.

Makdisi suggested that the medieval European doctorate, licentia docendi was modeled on the Islamic degree ijazat al-tadris wa-l-ifta, of which it is a word-for-word translation, with the term ifta' (issuing of fatwas) omitted. He also argued that these systems shared fundamental freedoms: the freedom of a professor to profess his personal opinion and the freedom of a student to pass judgement on what he is learning.

There are differences between Islamic and Western legal systems. For example, Sharia classically recognizes only natural persons, and never developed the concept of a legal person, or corporation, i.e., a legal entity that limits the liabilities of its managers, shareholders, and employees; exists beyond the lifetimes of its founders; and that can own assets, sign contracts, and appear in court through representatives. Interest prohibitions imposed secondary costs by discouraging record keeping and delaying the introduction of modern accounting.

Such factors, according to Timur Kuran, have played a significant role in retarding economic development in the Middle East. However, the rise of monopoly wealth and corporations have proven to also be detrimental to the economic equality of a society. Ziauddin Sardar also suggests that the promotion of equitable wealth distribution and suppression of monopoly capital are a part of Islam's message that emphasises genuine equity and justice.

== See also ==
- Criticism of Islam
- Criticism of Islamism
- Dīn
- Glossary of Islam
- Guardianship of the Islamic Jurists
- Halakha
- Imam Nawawi's Forty Hadith – a brief collection of forty hadith by the founder of the Shāfiʿī school – each used to illustrate a fundamental of shariah
- Islamic advice literature
- Islamic republic
- Islamic Sharia Council – a court in the United Kingdom with no legal authority
- Judicial independence
- Ma'ruf
- Parliamentary sovereignty
- Principle of legality in French criminal law
- Sources of Islamic law
- Theonomy
