= Islamic criminal jurisprudence =

Criminal law in line with Sharia prescriptions

Islamic criminal law (Arabic: فقه العقوبات) is criminal law in accordance with Sharia. Strictly speaking, Islamic law does not have a distinct corpus of "criminal law".

Islamic law divides crimes into three different categories depending on the offense – Hudud (crimes "against God", whose punishment is fixed in the Quran and the Hadiths), Qisas (crimes against an individual or family whose punishment is equal retaliation in the Quran and the Hadiths), and Tazir (crimes whose punishment is not specified in the Quran and the Hadiths, and is left to the discretion of the ruler or Qadi, i.e. judge). Some add the fourth category of Siyasah (crimes against government), while others consider it as part of either Hadd or Tazir crimes.

Crimes against God are prosecuted by the state as hudud crimes, and all other criminal matters, including murder and bodily injury, are treated as disputes between individuals with an Islamic judge deciding the outcome based on Sharia fiqh such as Hanafi, Maliki, Shafi'i, Hanbali and Ja'ari followed in the Islamic jurisdiction. According to the some interpretations, classification made with the phrase "against God's borders", unlike other crimes, hudud crimes are excluded from the scope of amnesty, even if the people against whom these crimes are committed give up their rights.

In practice, since early on in Islamic history, criminal cases were usually handled by ruler-administered courts or local police using procedures which were only loosely related to sharia. In the modern era, sharia-based criminal laws were widely replaced by statutes inspired by European models, although in recent decades several countries reintroduced elements of Islamic penal law into their legal codes under the growing influence of Islamist movements.

== Evidences/testimonies ==
The following statement in the Quran is thought to be the general rule of testimony in Islam, except for crime and punishment - for example, debt, shopping, etc.;

O believers! When you contract a loan for a fixed period of time, commit it to writing. Let the scribe maintain justice between the parties. The scribe should not refuse to write as Allah has taught them to write. They will write what the debtor dictates, bearing Allah in mind and not defrauding the debt. If the debtor is incompetent, weak, or unable to dictate, let their guardian dictate for them with justice. Call upon two of your men to witness. If two men cannot be found, then one man and two women of your choice will witness—so if one of the women forgets the other may remind her.

In a different example, in the necklace story of Aisha, which is called Asbab al-Nuzul for surah An-Nur:11-20 in Islamic terminology, four witnesses were required for the accusation of adultery. In addition, those who made accusations that did not meet the specified conditions would be punished with 80 lashes. The jurisprudence of later periods stipulates that witnesses must be men, covering all hadd crimes and people who did not have credibility and honesty in society (slaves, non-adl; sinners, infidels) could not testify against believers. In addition, the Islamic judiciary did not require strict proofs for the issues defined as tazir. The situation where sufficient conditions are not met for the hudud, or a weak sign or evidences that provides the Judicial discretion is sufficient such penalties.

== Classification of crimes ==
In addition to the different criteria to be sought in proving the crime, the evaluation of had crimes in the category of crimes against God's borders leads to a distinction between tazir crimes and others regarding the crime and the approach to the criminal; which crime falls into which category may vary depending on understanding In Islamic jurisprudence, the fact that the crime is within the scope of tazir crimes does not mean that it will be light, but unlike the hudud crimes, the heavy corporal punishments prescribed for the crime can be replaced with relatively light penalties such as fines, imprisonment or exile, and can be completely forgiven by the administration or the judge.

For example, according to some verses and hadiths, those who avoided alms and prayers were the ones to be fought against,) and according to some understandings, they were people who had abandoned religion - theologians debated whether worship was a part of faith - and according to classical fiqh sects, they were people who should be killed. Classical jurists discussed not whether the person who did not pray should be killed or not, but what class of punishment was the punishment given, such as hudud or tazir, and also the situation of apostasy of him or her, which led to secondary consequences such as the confiscation of the property of this person after the killing and the burial of his or her body in a Muslim cemetery according to Islamic traditions. Even if today's dominant understanding defines the abandonment of worship as sinfulness and does not approve of giving worldly punishment for them, in governments under sharia, their testimony against a devout Muslim may not be accepted, they may be humiliated and barred from certain positions because of this tag.

== Hudud ==
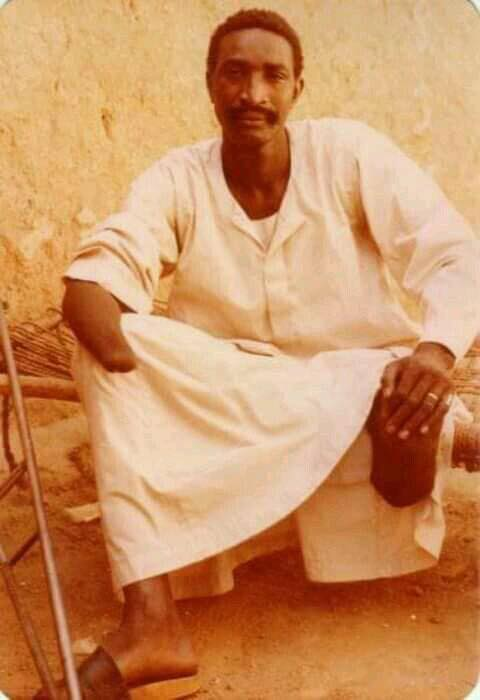
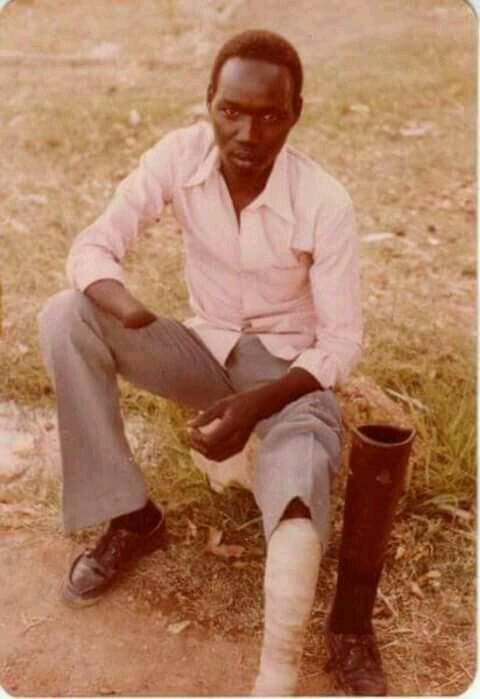
Cross amputation survivors, Adam Ismaeel (left) and Ibrahim Osman (right), of the September 1983 Laws in Sudan, pictured in 1986; According to the understanding, these people must have declared war against Allah and the Prophet.(see:Cross-amputation)

Traditional Islamic jurisprudence divides crimes into offenses against God and those against man. The former are seen to violate God's hudud, or 'boundaries'. These punishments were specified by the Quran, and in some instances by the Sunnah.

Hudud laws prescribe fixed punishments for between five and seven types of crimes, depending on the particular school of thought. The offenses incurring hudud punishments are zina (unlawful sexual intercourse), unfounded accusations of zina, consuming intoxicants, highway robbery, and some forms of theft. Jurists have differed as to whether apostasy and rebellion against a lawful Islamic ruler are hudud crimes.

Hudud punishments range from public lashing to publicly stoning to death, amputation of hands and crucifixion. Hudud crimes cannot be pardoned by the victim or by the state, and the punishments must be carried out in public. However, the evidentiary standards for these punishments were often impossibly high, and they were infrequently implemented in practice. For example, meeting hudud requirements for zina and theft was virtually impossible without a confession, which could be invalidated by a retraction. Based on a hadith, jurists stipulated that hudud punishments should be averted by the slightest doubts or ambiguities (shubuhat). The harsher hudud punishments were meant to deter and to convey the gravity of offenses against God, rather than to be carried out.

During the 19th century, sharia-based criminal laws were replaced by statutes inspired by European models nearly everywhere in the Islamic world, except some particularly conservative regions such as the Arabian peninsula. The Islamic revival of the late 20th century brought along calls by Islamist movements for full implementation of sharia. Reinstatement of hudud punishments has had particular symbolic importance for these groups because of their Quranic origin, and their advocates have often disregarded the stringent traditional restrictions on their application. In practice, in the countries where hudud have been incorporated into the legal code under Islamist pressure, they have often been used sparingly or not at all, and their application has varied depending on local political climate. Their use has been a subject of criticism and debate.

== Qisas ==
Qisas is the Islamic principle of "an eye for an eye". This category includes the crimes of murder and battery.

Punishment is either exact retribution or compensation (Diyya).

The issue of qisas gained considerable attention in the Western media in 2009 when Ameneh Bahrami, an Iranian woman blinded in an acid attack, demanded that her attacker be blinded as well. The concept of punishment under Qisas is not based on "society" versus the "individual" (the wrong doer), but rather that of "individuals and families" (victim(s)) versus "individuals and families" (wrong doer(s)). Thus the victim has the ability to pardon the perpetrator and withhold punishment even in the case of murder. Bahrami pardoned her attacker and stopped his punishment (drops of acid in his eyes) just before it was to be administered in 2011.

=== Diyyat ===
Diyya is compensation paid to the heirs of a victim. In Arabic the word means both blood money and ransom.

The Quran specifies the principle of Qisas (i.e. retaliation), but prescribes that one should seek compensation (Diyya) and not demand retribution.

We have prescribed for thee therein (the Torah) 'a life for a life, and an eye for an eye, and a nose for a nose, and an ear for an ear, and a tooth for a tooth, and for wounds retaliation;' but whoso remits it, it is an expiation for him, but he whoso will not judge by what God has revealed, these be the unjust.

== Tazir ==
Tazir includes any crime that does not fit into Hudud or Qisas and which therefore has no punishment specified in the Quran. Tazir in Islamic criminal jurisprudence are those crimes where the punishment is at the discretion of the state, the ruler or a Qadi, for actions considered sinful or destructive of public order, but which are not punishable as hadd or qisas under Sharia.

== See also ==
- Capital and corporal punishment in Islam
- Hudood Ordinances
- Repentance in Islam
