= Seven Destructive Sins =

Hadith concept in Islamic theology detailing seven major sins

The Seven Destructive Sins (Arabic: السبع الموبقات Al-Sab' al-Mubiqat), also referred to as the Seven Grave Sins, is a foundational prophetic tradition (Hadith) in Islam that designates seven prohibited actions carrying severe theological and legal penalties. These offenses were explicitly enumerated by the Prophet Muhammad and are recorded in the canonical Sunni Hadith compendiums.

The primary text is documented in the collections of Sahih al-Bukhari and Sahih Muslim:

Narrated Abu Hurairah: The Messenger of Allah said: "Avoid the seven destructive sins." The companions inquired: "O Messenger of Allah, what are they?" He replied: "Associating partners with Allah, magic, killing a soul which Allah has forbidden except by right, consuming usury, consuming the wealth of an orphan, fleeing from the battlefield on the day of battle, and slandering chaste, believing, unaware women."

== Etymology and definition ==
=== Linguistic origin ===
The term *al-Mubiqat* is derived from the Arabic trilateral root w-b-q (وَبِقَ), which philologically denotes perishing, becoming trapped, or facing destruction. In classical Arabic lexicography, a person is described as *wabiqa* when they become heavily entangled or ruined by their transgressions.

=== Jurisprudential framework ===
In Islamic jurisprudence, *Al-Mubiqat* is synonymous with the highest tier of major sins (Al-Kaba'ir). Classical commentators, including Ibn Hajar al-Asqalani, noted that these specific actions were designated as "destructive" because they directly result in the spiritual perdition of the perpetrator in the afterlife and entail formal legal punishments (Hudud or Tazir) in worldly governance.

The Quran employs derivatives of the same linguistic root to indicate a barrier to salvation or a place of absolute destruction, such as in Surah Al-Kahf (18:52): "...And We will make between them a [place of] certain destruction (mawbiqa)" and Surah Ash-Shura (42:34): "Or He destroys them (yuwbiq-hunna) for what they earned."

== Jurisprudential analysis of the seven sins ==
Legal scholars across the major schools of Islamic law agree that the specification of "seven" sins in this text does not establish an absolute numerical restriction for major sins. Instead, the tradition highlights these seven due to their immediate threat to the foundational public benefits protected under Maqasid al-Shariah (the higher objectives of Islamic law): religion, life, intellect, wealth, and honor.

=== Polytheism ===
The assignment of co-equals or intermediaries to God (Arabic: شِرْك, romanized: shirk, lit. 'association') in worship or lordship is classified as the gravest transgression in Islamic theology, rendering all spiritual deeds void if unrepented.

=== Magic ===
Classical jurists view active engagement in sorcery, occult practices, or malicious spells (سحر, siḥr) as a subversion of faith. It often carried capital statutory penalties under historic Islamic criminal law regulations and still can be punished by death in Saudi Arabia.

=== Unjustified homicide ===
The intentional or semi-intentional taking of human life outside the authorized boundaries of judicial capital punishment or defensive combat operations is included amoungsth the seven destructive sins, however, traditional Islamic jurisprudence treats homicide only as a civil dispute between victim and perpetrator, rather than an act requiring corrective punishment by the state to maintain order.

=== Usury ===
In Islam, usury (ربا, ribā) includes any form of enrichment that involves paying or charging interest in financial transactions.

=== Consuming the wealth of an orphan ===
The misappropriation or embezzlement of property belonging to a minor orphan by a designated trustee or guardian.

=== Fleeing from the battlefield ===
Fleeing from the battlefield (التولي يوم الزحف, al-tawalli yawm al-zahf) means the unauthorized desertion of combat lines during an aggressive military action.

=== False accusation ===
Quadf (القذف) is the false accusation of unchastity, adultery, or fornication directed at innocent individuals. Legal consensus dictates that while the text specifies women, it applies equally to men, carrying a fixed statutory penalty of 80 lashes.

== Scriptural correlation on minor transgressions ==
Prophetic traditions emphasize that the persistent commission of minor, unrepented sins can cumulatively result in spiritual destruction, effectively shifting their status to *Mubiqat*. In Sahih al-Bukhari, Anas ibn Malik stated: "You indulge in certain misdeeds which you consider more insignificant than a hair, but we used to count them as destructive sins (*Mubiqat*) during the lifetime of the Prophet."

== Legal parameters of repentance ==
Under Islamic legal theology, standard major sins can be expiated through sincere repentance (Tawbah Nasuh), which demands immediate cessation of the act, deep remorse, and a firm resolution to avoid recurrence. However, if the destructive sin involves a direct violation of human rights (Huquq al-Ibad)—such as homicide or financial fraud against orphans—the repentance is legally invalid unless the usurped property is fully restored or personal restitution is granted by the victim or their legal heirs.

== See also ==
- Al-Kaba'ir (Major Sins)
- Sin in Islam
- Islamic military jurisprudence
- Qadhf
