= Gandhi Street murders =

Double murder in Tehran, Iran

- Motive: Familial conflict, alleged cultural influences
- Conviction: Murder (2 counts)
- Penalty: Death (commuted to 10 and 12 years in prison)

Details
- Date: 1 January 1997

The Gandhi Street murders were a double murder in Tehran, Iran, committed on 1 January 1997 by two 16-year-olds, Somayeh and Shahrokh. The victims were Somayeh's younger siblings, 13-year-old Sepideh and 8-year-old Mohammadreza, who were killed in their family's villa on Gandhi Street. Both perpetrators were initially sentenced to death under the principle of Qisas, but the sentence was later commuted after Somayeh's father granted pardon. Shahrokh received ten years in prison and Somayeh twelve, although reports suggest both were released after only a few years. The case became widely known in Iran. Scholars and commentators have since linked the notoriety of the case to broader social anxieties in the post-revolutionary country.

== Events ==
The perpetrators, both 16 years old, Somayeh and Shahrokh, were in a romantic relationship that Somayeh's father opposed due to social and family norms. According to later reports, Somayeh struggled with depression and psychological distress, and her relationship with Shahrokh intensified tensions within the household. Planning for the killings reportedly began the night before the murders.

On 1 January 1997, Somayeh and Shahrokh lured Somayeh's younger siblings, 13-year-old Sepideh and 8-year-old Mohammadreza, to the second floor of their family's villa on Gandhi Street in Tehran. The children were killed through a combination of strangulation and drowning in the bathroom. Some reports suggested that air injections with syringes were also attempted, though this was not confirmed by forensic authorities. Their initial plan reportedly included killing Somayeh's mother as well, but this attempt failed. After surviving the attack, the mother fled the house and alerted neighbors, leading to the immediate involvement of police and the arrest of Somayeh and Shahrokh.

== Investigation and trial ==
The perpetrators later admitted that they had been influenced by popular culture, with claims linking their actions to the American film Natural Born Killers (1994) and to Western music genres such as heavy metal. However, in subsequent interviews, Somayeh denied that music or film directly motivated the crime.

Somayeh and Shahrokh were tried in early 1997 in Tehran. On 5 February 1997, both were sentenced to death by qisas (retribution in kind). The sentence was later commuted after Somayeh's father formally forgave the perpetrators, in accordance with Iranian law, which grants families of victims the right to pardon. As a result, Shahrokh received a ten-year prison sentence and Somayeh twelve years. Reports indicate that neither served their full terms and both were released after approximately three to four years.

== Public response ==
The Gandhi Street murders generated widespread media attention in Iran and were remembered as one of the most shocking juvenile crimes of the 1990s. The young age of the perpetrators, their romantic relationship, and the familial nature of the killings drew comparisons in international media to literary and popular culture. The Associated Press described the case as "a Romeo-and-Juliet story with a Stephen King ending." In Iran, the case became known as the "Crime of Gandhi Street" (جنایت خیابان گاندی). It was cited in academic and cultural discussions as an event that intensified parental concerns about teenage relationships and the influence of Western media on youth. Scholars analyzing the Persian blogosphere have noted that the case "left a huge mark in the psyche of Iranians" and served as a cautionary tale in public discourse.
