= Leges inter Brettos et Scottos =

10th-century Scottish law code

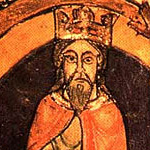
David I, who codified the Laws of the Bretts and Scotts

Ethnolinguistic division of northern Britain, 1100

The Leges inter Brettos et Scottos or Laws of the Brets and Scots was a legal codification under David I of Scotland (reigned 1124 – 1153). Only a small fragment of the original document survives, describing the penalties for several offences against people.

Historically, the term "Brets" refers to Brythonic peoples, while "Scots" refers to Gaelic-speaking peoples. Skene however, asserted that here "Scots" refers to all of the peoples living north of the firths of Clyde and Forth.

Aside from the document's intrinsic importance to Scottish history, it is significant in its similarity to corresponding areas both of Irish Brehon law and of Welsh law, which are better-preserved than the laws of medieval southern Scotland, allowing reasonable conjectures to be made regarding the laws and customs of the region, as few historical records exist.

The Laws or their precursor were relevant in the early twelfth century, as the Laws of the Four Burghs (Latin: Leges Quatuor Burgorum) explicitly banned parts of it relating to the cro (or weregild). (Note: The Laws of the Four Burghs is dated between 1135 and 1157, and there is uncertainty and some contention in establishing the specific date. The four burghs were then Stirling, Edinburgh, Lanark, and Linlithgow, with the latter two replaced by Roxburgh and Berwick in 1168.)

The Laws were specifically abolished in 1305 by Edward I of England, following his invasion of Scotland. This does not appear to have diminished their influence in Scottish law, however. Among the surviving clauses the practice of 'Galanas' (British or Welsh) continued to at least the end of the 16th century:

"In March 1587, a month after the execution of Mary, Queen of Scots, there was a meeting between ambassadors from England and Scotland. According to the account of the well-informed contemporary Scots lawyer David Moysie, the English assured the Scots... that Elizabeth was "verie sore for taking Queine Mares lyfe", and asked what satisfaction could be offered to James VI. The Scots' reply must have sounded very odd to English ears. They stated that it was not up to James to tell them. Rather, it was the "custome of Scotland" that the committers of a murder should make offers of compensation to the kin and friends of the victim, who would then discuss and resolve upon them... So deeply embedded was the principle of compensation in the fabric of Scottish justice that it could as well be invoked, if for diplomatic reasons, for a king as for the lowest of the gentry; for anyone, in fact, who had the means to compensate, and who had kin and friends to support him. The sixteenth-century English ambassadors may well have been as baffled as the thirteenth-century English clerk who wrote in bewilderment: "Find out what the law of galanas is?". "

== The surviving clauses ==
The surviving clauses show the society's origins as a kinship based culture, where a perpetrator's family is responsible for the perpetrator's transgressions, and the family of a victim is compensated for the loss of a family member. As with other Celtic societies, the rights and obligations of women are explicitly guaranteed (though at a lesser standing than that of men). Marriages are treated as relationships between different families, and payments accrue to the family of the victim's spouse under some circumstances, but accrue to the victim's family under other circumstances.

=== Definition of the penalties ===
- Penalties for death, including honour-price (clause LV) – cro, enach, and galnes (cf. Irish crólige báis relating to éraic, Irish enech, and Welsh galanas, resp.). Payment is made to the victims or their families. This is the feature of tribal law commonly known in English as a weregild.
- Penalties for homicides that breach the king's peace (clause LVI) – These are separate from other penalties that might result from killing a person. It includes breaches to the peace of lesser individuals (such as breaching the peace of a noble), which have lesser penalties. Payment is made to the person whose peace was breached.
- Penalties for wounding or insults to personal honour (clauses LVII and LVIII) – kelchin or gelchach (cf. Irish enech and Welsh sarhad). Payment is made to the victims or their families. Penalties are distinguished for greater and lesser wounds (e.g., different penalties for drawing blood than for a wound that does not draw blood).

=== Penalty amount according to social position ===
The amounts to be paid were on a scale according to the social position of the victim, with the king at the top with the greatest value, then with a lesser amount for his son or high-ranking noble, an even lesser amount for other nobles, and so on down to the least amount for a common person. Amounts for homicide were given both as a number of cows, and as an equivalent amount of gold. Amounts for wounding or insult were given in gold only.

Payments for a female victim were one third less than that of her husband (but equal to that of her brother if she were unmarried), and make clear that women retained their original kinship and rights after marriage, as death penalties were owed by her family (and not by her husband's family), while death payments were made to her family (and not to the husband's family). Also, the importance of the marriage is acknowledged in that some payments for insult accrue to the spouse of the victim, rather than to the victim's family.

== See also ==
- Anglo-Saxon law
- Davidian Revolution
- Brehon law
- Celtic law
- Welsh law
