= Zina =

Islamic legal term referring to unlawful sexual intercourse

Zināʾ (زِنَاء) or zinā (زِنًى or زِنًا) is an Islamic legal term referring to unlawful sexual intercourse. According to traditional jurisprudence, zina can include adultery, fornication, prostitution, sodomy, incest, and bestiality. Zina must be proved by testimony of four Muslim eyewitnesses to the actual act of penetration, confession repeated four times and not retracted later. The offenders must have acted of their own free will. Rapists could be prosecuted under different legal categories which used normal evidentiary rules. Accusing zina without presenting the required eyewitnesses is called qadhf (القذف), which is itself a hudud offense.

When an unmarried male commits adultery with an unmarried female (they should receive) one hundred lashes and banishment for one year and in case of a married male committing adultery with a married female, they shall receive one hundred lashes and be stoned to death as per the Sunnah.

There are very few recorded examples of the stoning penalty for zinā being implemented legally. Before legal reform was introduced in several countries during the 20th century, the procedural requirements for proving the offense of zinā to the standard necessary to impose the stoning penalty were effectively impossible to meet.

Zina became a more pressing issue in modern times, as Islamist movements and governments employed polemics against public immorality. In recent decades, several countries passed legal reforms that incorporated elements of hudud laws into their legal codes, and many modern Islamists have also disregarded the condition of strict evidence requirements. In Nigeria, local courts have passed several stoning sentences, all of which were overturned on appeal or left unenforced. In Pakistan, the Hudood Ordinances of 1979 subsumed prosecution of rape under the category of zina, making rape extremely difficult to prove and exposing the victims to jail sentences for admitting illicit intercourse forced upon them, although these laws were amended in 2006, and again in 2016. According to human rights organizations, stoning to death for zina has also been carried out in Saudi Arabia. Ordinances like the Hudud Ordinances are not Islamic, in terms of rape and zina. The Deobandi ʿulamāʾ declared these Ordinances as un-Islamic.

== Islamic scriptures ==
Muslim scholars have historically considered zinā a hudud sin, or crime against God. It is mentioned in both Quran and in the Hadiths.

=== Introduction and definition ===
The Quran deals with zinaʾ in several places. First is the Qur'anic general rule that commands Muslims not to commit zina:

Do not go near adultery. It is truly a shameful deed and an evil way.

— Surah Al-Isra 17:32

In the Hadiths, the definitions of zina have been described as all the forms of sexual intercourse, penetrative or non-penetrative, outside of marriage. However, sex between a man and his female slave was not defined as extramarital sex; a man having the right to sexual intercourse with his own female slave.

Abu Huraira reported Allah's Apostle as saying: “Allah has decreed for every son of Adam his share of zina, which he will inevitably commit. The zina of the eyes is looking, the zina of the tongue is speaking, one may wish and desire, and the private parts confirm that or deny it.”

— 8:77:609, 33:6421

=== Adultery and fornication ===
==== Quran ====
Stoning punishment, a form of capital punishment for adultery, is not mentioned in the canonical text of the Quran. Most of the rules related to fornication, adultery and false accusations from a husband to his wife or from members of the community to chaste women can be found in Surah an-Nur (the Light). The surah starts by giving very specific rules about punishment for zina:

As for female and male fornicators, give each of them one hundred lashes, and do not let pity for them make you lenient in ˹enforcing˺ the law of Allah, if you ˹truly˺ believe in Allah and the Last Day. And let a number of believers witness their punishment.

— Surah An-Nur 24:2

Those who accuse chaste women ˹of adultery˺ and fail to produce four witnesses, give them eighty lashes ˹each˺. And do not ever accept any testimony from them—for they are indeed the rebellious— except those who repent afterwards and mend their ways, then surely Allah is All-Forgiving, Most Merciful.

— Surah An-Nur 24:4–5

According to Jonathan A. C. Brown, Surah an-Nisa verse 4:25 prescribes punishment for a female slave guilty of a sexual offense as half of the punishment of a free woman:

But if any of you cannot afford to marry a free believing woman, then ˹let him marry˺ a believing bondwoman possessed by one of you. Allah knows best ˹the state of˺ your faith ˹and theirs˺. You are from one another. So marry them with the permission of their owners, giving them their right of Mehar ( a compulsory gift to bride) in fairness, if they are chaste, neither promiscuous nor having secret affairs. If they commit indecency after marriage, they receive half the punishment of free women. This is for those of you who fear falling into sin. But if you are patient, it is better for you. And Allah is All-Forgiving, Most Merciful. – Quran 4:25

==== Hadith ====
The public lashing punishment for fornication and adultery are also prescribed in Hadiths, the books most trusted in Islam after Quran, particularly in Kitab Al-Hudud.

'Ubada b. As-Samit reported: Allah's Messenger as saying: Receive teaching from me, receive teaching from me. Allah has ordained a way for those women. When an unmarried male commits adultery with an unmarried female, they should receive one hundred lashes and banishment for one year. And in case of married male committing adultery with a married female, they shall receive one hundred lashes and be stoned to death.

— 17:4191

Ma'iz came to the Prophet and admitted having committed adultery four times in his presence so he ordered him to be stoned to death, but said to Huzzal: If you had covered him with your garment, it would have been better for you.

— 38:4364

Hadith Sahih al Bukhari, another authentic source of sunnah, has several entries which refer to death by stoning. For example,

Narrated 'Aisha: 'Utba bin Abi Waqqas said to his brother Sa'd bin Abi Waqqas, "The son of the slave girl of Zam'a is from me, so take him into your custody." So in the year of Conquest of Mecca, Sa'd took him and said. (This is) my brother's son whom my brother has asked me to take into my custody." 'Abd bin Zam'a got up before him and said, (He is) my brother and the son of the slave girl of my father, and was born on my father's bed." So they both submitted their case before Allah's Apostle. Sa'd said, "O Allah's Apostle! This boy is the son of my brother and he entrusted him to me." 'Abd bin Zam'a said, "This boy is my brother and the son of the slave girl of my father, and was born on the bed of my father." Allah's Apostle said, "The boy is for you, O 'Abd bin Zam'a!" Then Allah's Apostle further said, "The child is for the owner of the bed, and the stone is for the adulterer," He then said to Sauda bint Zam'a, "Veil (screen) yourself before him," when he saw the child's resemblance to 'Utba. The boy did not see her again till he met Allah.

— 9:89:293

Other hadith collections on zina between men and woman include:

- The stoning (Rajm) of a Jewish man and woman for having committed illegal sexual intercourse.
- Abu Hurairah states that the Prophet, in a case of intercourse between a young man and a married woman, sentenced the woman to stoning and the young man to flogging and banishment for a year. (Sahih Muslim 17:4209)

=== Rape ===
Rape has been defined as zina al-jabr (forceful illicit sex) in the traditional Islamic texts. Few hadiths have been found regarding rape in the time of Muhammad. The most popular transmitted hadith given below indicates the ordinance of stoning for the rapist but no punishment and no requirement of four eyewitnesses for the rape victim.

Narrated 'Alqamah bin Wa'il Al-Kindi: From his father: "A woman went out during the time of the Prophet (ﷺ) to go to Salat, but she was caught by a man and he had relations with her, so she screamed and he left. Then a man came across her and she said: 'That man has done this and that to me', then she came across a group of Emigrants (Muhajirin) and she said: 'That man did this and that to me.' They went to get the man she thought had relations with her, and they brought him to her. She said: 'Yes, that's him.' So they brought him to the Messenger of Allah (ﷺ), and when he ordered that he be stoned, the man who had relations with her, said: 'O Messenger of Allah, I am the one who had relations with her.' So he said to her: 'Go, for Allah has forgiven you.' Then he said some nice words to the man (who was brought). And he said to the man who had relations with her: 'Stone him.' Then he said: 'He has repented a repentance that, if the inhabitants of Al-Madinah had repented with, it would have been accepted from them.'"

— Jami` at-Tirmidhi, 17:37, 38:4366

The hadiths declare rape of a free or slave woman as zina. However, despite the power imbalance between a master and his slave, making it impossible for a slave to give true consent, sex between a man and his female slave was not defined as rape nor as zina; a man having the right to sexual intercourse with his own female slave.

==== View of scholars ====
Malik related to me from Nafi that a slave was in charge of the slaves in the khumus and he forced a slave-girl among those slaves against her will and had intercourse with her. Umar ibn al-Khattab had him flogged and banished him, and he did not flog the slave-girl because the slave had forced her.

— 1:85:81,41 3.15

Malik related to me from Ibn Shihab that gave a judgment that the rapist had to pay the raped woman her bride-price. Yahya said that he heard Malik say, "What is done in our community about the man who rapes a woman, virgin or non-virgin, if she is free, is that he must pay the bride-price of the like of her. If she is a slave, he must pay what he has diminished of her worth. The hadd-punishment in such cases is applied to the rapist, and there is no punishment applied to the raped woman. If the rapist is a slave, that is against his master unless he wishes to surrender him."

— 36 16.14

If a confession or the four witnesses required to prove a hadd crime are not available, but rape can be proved by other means, the rapist is sentenced under the ta'zir system of judicial discretion. According to the eleventh-century Maliki jurist Ibn 'Abd al-Barr:

The scholars are unanimously agreed that the rapist is to be subjected to the hadd punishment if there is clear evidence against him that he deserves the hadd punishment, or if he admits to that. Otherwise, he is to be punished (i.e., if there is no proof that the hadd punishment for zina may be carried out against him because he does not confess, and there are not four witnesses, then the judge may punish him and stipulate a punishment that will deter him and others like him). There is no punishment for the woman if it is true that he forced her and overpowered her, which may be proven by her screaming and shouting for help.

— Al-Istidhkaar, 7/146

=== Homosexuality ===
Islamic teachings (in the hadith tradition) presume same-sex attraction, extol abstention and (in the Qur'an) condemn consummation. There are no reports relating to homosexuality in the best known and authentic hadith collections of Sahih al-Bukhari and Sahih Muslim, other canonical collections record a number of condemnations of the "act of the people of Lut" (male-to-male anal intercourse). Some Quranic verses are used to propose a prohibition of homosexual activities, including:

And ˹remember˺ when Lot scolded ˹the men of˺ his people, ˹saying,˺ “Do you commit a shameful deed that no man has ever done before? You lust after men instead of women! You are certainly transgressors.”

— Surah Al-A'raf 7:80–81

In another verse, the statement of the prophet Lot has also been pointed out,

Why do you ˹men˺ lust after fellow men, leaving the wives that your Lord has created for you? In fact, you are a transgressing people.”

— Surah Ash-Shu'ara 26:165–166

Some scholars indicate this verse as the prescribed punishment for homosexuality in the Quran:

And the two among you who commit this sin—discipline them. If they repent and mend their ways, relieve them. Surely Allah is ever Accepting of Repentance, Most Merciful.

— Surah An-Nisa 4:16

However, there are different interpretations of the last verse where the Quran refers to as "two among you". Pakistani scholar Javed Ahmed Ghamidi sees it as a reference to premarital sexual relationships between men and women. In his opinion, the preceding Ayat of Sura Nisa deals with prostitutes of the time. He believes these rulings were temporary and were abrogated later when a functioning state was established and society was ready for permanent rulings, which came in Sura Nur, Ayat 2 and 3, prescribing flogging as a punishment for adultery. He does not see stoning as a prescribed punishment, even for married men, and considers the Hadiths quoted supporting that view to be dealing with either rape or prostitution, where the strictest punishment under Islam for spreading "fasad fil ardh", meaning corruption in the land, referring to egregious acts of defiance to the rule of law was carried out.

Maliki, Shafi'i and Hanbali jurists insist that anal sex between men is a hudud crime punished with death, however Hanafi jurists argue that the act is immoral and forbidden but does not qualify as a hudud violation.

The Hadiths consider homosexuality as zina. For example, Abu Dawud state,

From Abu Musa al-Ash'ari, the Prophet states that: "If a woman comes upon a woman, they are both adulteresses, if a man comes upon a man, then they are both adulterers.”

— Al-Tabarani in al-Mu‘jam al-Awat: 4157, Al-Bayhaqi, Su‘ab al-Iman: 5075

The discourse on homosexuality in Islam is primarily concerned with activities between men. There are, however, a few hadith mentioning homosexual behavior in women; The jurists are agreed that "there is no hadd punishment for lesbianism, because it is not zina. Rather a ta’zeer punishment must be imposed, because it is a sin..'". Although punishment for lesbianism is rarely mentioned in the histories, al-Tabari records an example of the casual execution of a pair of lesbian slavegirls in the harem of al-Hadi, in a collection of highly critical anecdotes pertaining to that Caliph's actions as ruler. Some jurists viewed sexual intercourse as possible only for an individual who possesses a phallus; hence those definitions of sexual intercourse that rely on the entry of as little as the corona of the phallus into a partner's orifice. Since women do not possess a phallus and cannot have intercourse with one another, they are, in this interpretation, physically incapable of committing zina.

=== Anal sex ===
All Sunni Muslim jurists agree that anal sex is haram (prohibited), based on the hadith of Muhammad. In contrast, according to Twelver Shia Muslim jurists, anal sex is considered makruh (strongly disliked) but is permissible with the consent of the wife.

Many scholars point to the story of Lot in the Quran as an example of sodomy being an egregious sin. However, multiple others hold the view that the destruction of Sodom and Gomorrah was not specifically due to the sodomy practiced in those towns but as a combination of multiple transgressions. The death by stoning for people of Sodom and Gomorrah is similar to the stoning punishment stipulated for illegal heterosexual sex. There is no punishment for a man who sodomizes a woman because it is not tied to procreation. However, other jurists insist that any act of lust in which the result is the injection of semen into another person constitutes sexual intercourse.

Sodomy often falls under that same category as sex between an unmarried man and woman engaging in sexual acts. Male-male intercourse is referred to as liwat while female-female intercourse is referred to as sihaq. Both are considered reprehensible acts, but there is no consensus on punishment for either. Some jurists define zināʾ exclusively as the act of unlawful vaginal penetration, hence categorizing and punishing anal penetration in different ways. Other jurists included both vaginal and anal penetration within the definition of zināʾ and hence extended the punishment of the one to the other.

Religious discourse has mostly focused on such sexual acts, which are unambiguously condemned. The Quran refers explicitly to male-male sexual relations only in the context of the story of Lot, but labels the Sodomites's actions (universally understood in the later tradition as anal intercourse) an "abomination" (female-female relations are not addressed). Reported pronouncements by Muhammad (hadith) reinforce the interdiction on male-male sodomy, although there are no reports of his ever adjudicating an actual case of such an offence; he is also quoted as condemning cross-gender behaviour for both sexes and banishing them from local places, but it is unclear to what extent this is to be understood as involving sexual relations. Several early caliphs, confronted with cases of sodomy between males, are said to have had both partners executed by a variety of means. While taking such precedents into account, medieval jurists were unable to achieve a consensus on this issue; some legal schools prescribed capital punishment for sodomy, but others opted only for a relatively mild discretionary punishment. There was general agreement, however, that other homosexual acts (including any between females) were lesser offences, subject only to discretionary punishment.

=== Incest ===
Hadith forbids incestuous relationship (zinā bi'l-mahārim), sexual intercourse between someone who is seen as your mahram and prescribes execution as punishment.

Narrated Ibn 'Abbas: That the Prophet said: "If a man says to another man: 'O you Jew' then beat him twenty times. If he says: 'O you effeminate' then beat him twenty times. And whoever has relations with someone that is a mahram (family member or blood relative) then kill him."

— Jami` at-Tirmidhi, 17:46

It was narrated from Ibn`Abbas that the Messenger of Allah (ﷺ) said:“Whoever has intercourse with a Mahram relative, kill him; and whoever has intercourse with an animal, kill him, and kill the animal.”

— Sunan Ibn Majah, 2564

=== Masturbation ===
Islamic scripture does not specifically mention masturbation. Like most people before the morals of the Age of Enlightenment, pre-modern Islam faced masturbation mostly with indifference. A few hadiths underline this view. Muhammad is reported to have said that "it is your fluid, or your member, so do whatever you like, as it were." There are a few hadiths demonizing masturbation but these are classified as unreliable.

To prohibit masturbation, scholars (ulama) of fiqh (Islamic jurisprudence) may have invoked the Qur'anic proclamation (Quran 23:1–6) that Muslims must protect their sexual organs, except from their legal spouses (azwājihim) or what their right hands own. The Mālikīs jurists follow suit and seem to categorically prohibit masturbation. Abū Bakr b. al-ʿArabī goes as far as to demonize this practise, stating that it was introduced by šayṭān (devil). Imam al-Shafi'i states that male masturbation (istimmā') runs afoul of the Qur'anic proclamation (Quran 23:1–6) that Muslims must protect their sexual organs, except from their legal spouses (azwājihim) or what their right hands own. The Shafi'i school agree with the Mālikīs, and some of them consider masturbation a lesser form of zinā. The founder al-Shafi'i argued that this encourages men to neglect their wives and may cause the termination of family lineage.

The Ḥanafīs have mixed opinions. Most of them are rather critical about, but generally allow for unmarried people and even obligatory if the alternative is illicit sex. Similarly, diverse are opinions among the Ḥanbalīs. Ibn Taimiyya's statement, a proto-Salaf Hanbalite scholar, states that the consensus of early and later jurists (salafan wa-ḫalafan) was to categorically prohibit masturbation, is clearly an overstatement. Due to a lack of concern about masturbation from Quran and hadiths, Ḥanbalīs generally disliked (makrūh), but did not forbid masturbation. However, if one couldn't find a spouse, one would be encouraged to masturbate.

Those who didn't adhere to any of these four major schools are often going into more detail. Ibn Ḥazm explains that "a woman who rubs something against herself (without inserting it) until she climaxes is not guilty of sin; the same is true of a man who masturbates. No scholar, he points out, disagrees that it is perfectly lawful for a person to touch their sex organ (specifying the use of the left hand for men), and since no scriptural text explicitly prohibits masturbation, it must be lawful". However, he adds that it is not appropriate for civilized people to do this.

=== Bestiality ===
According to the hadith, bestiality is defined under zina and its punishment is execution of the accused person along with the animal.

Narrated Ibn 'Abbas: That the Messenger of Allah said: "Whomever you see having relations with an animal then kill him and kill animal." So it was said to Ibn 'Abbas: "What is the case of the animal?" He said: "I did not hear anything from the Messenger of Allah about this, but I see that the Messenger of Allah disliked eating its meat or using it, due to the fact that such a (heinous) thing has been done with that animal."

— Jami` at-Tirmidhi, 17:38

It was narrated from Ibn`Abbas that the Messenger of Allah (ﷺ) said:“Whoever has intercourse with a Mahram relative, kill him; and whoever has intercourse with an animal, kill him, and kill the animal.”

— Sunan Ibn Majah, 2564

== Inclusions in the definition ==
Technically, zina only refers to the act of penetration, while non-penetrative sex acts outside of marriage were censured by Muhammad as that which can lead to zina.

According to Sharia, the punishment for zina varies according to whether the offender is muhsan (adult, free, Muslim and married at least once) or not muhsan (i.e. a minor, a slave, a non-Muslim or never married). A person only qualifies as muhsan if he or she meets all of the criteria. The punishment for an offender who is muhsan is stoning. (rajm); the punishment for an offender who is not muhsan is 100 lashes.

== Accusation process and punishment ==
Islamic law requires evidence before a man or a woman can be punished for zina. These are:

1. A Muslim confesses to zina four separate times. However, if the confessor takes back his words before the punishment is enforced or during the punishment, he/she will be released and set free. The confessor is, in fact, encouraged to take back their confession.
2. Four free adult male Muslim witnesses of proven integrity. They must testify that they observed the couple engaged in unlawful sexual intercourse without any doubt or ambiguity. They are able to say that they saw their private parts meet "like the Kohl needle entering the Kohl bottle."
3. Unlike witnesses in most other circumstances, they are neither legally nor morally obliged to testify, and in fact legal texts state that it is morally better if they don't.
4. If any of the witnesses take back their testimony before the actual punishment is enforced, then the punishment will be abandoned, and the witnesses will be punished for the crime of false accusation.
5. The witnesses must give their testimony at the earliest opportunity.
6. If the offense is punished by stoning to death, the witnesses must throw the stones.

If a pregnant woman confesses that her baby was born from an illegal relationship, then she will be subject to conviction in the Islamic courts. In cases where there are no witnesses and no confession, then the woman will not receive punishment just because of pregnancy. Women can fall pregnant without committing illegal sexual intercourse. A woman could be raped or coerced. In this case, she is a victim and not the perpetrator of a crime. Therefore, she cannot be punished or even accused of misconduct merely on the strength of her falling pregnant.

The four witnesses' requirement for zina is revealed by Quranic verses 24:11 through 24:13 and various hadiths. The testimony of women and non-Muslims is not admitted in cases of zina or in other hadd crimes.

Any witness to or victim of non-consensual sexual intercourse, who accuses a Muslim of zina, but fails to produce four adult, pious male eyewitnesses before a sharia court, commits the crime of false accusation (Qadhf, القذف), punishable with eighty lashes in public.

These requirements made zina virtually impossible to prove in practice. Hence, there are very few recorded examples of stoning for zina being legally carried out. In the 623-year history of the Ottoman Empire, the best-documented and most well-known pre-modern Islamic legal system, there is only one recorded example of the stoning punishment being applied for zina, when a Muslim woman and her Jewish lover were convicted of zina in 1680 and sentenced to death, the woman by stoning and the man by beheading. This was a miscarriage of justice according to the standards of Islamic law: adequate evidence was not produced, and the correct penalty for non-Muslims was 100 lashes rather than death.

Some schools of Islamic jurisprudence (fiqh) created the principle of shubha (doubt). According to this principle, if there is room for doubt in the perpetrator's mind about whether the sexual act was illegal, he or she should not receive the hadd penalty but could receive a less severe punishment at the discretion of the judge. Jurists had varying opinions on what counted as legitimate "doubt" for this purposes. A typical example is a man who has sex with his wife's or his son's slave. This is zina – a man can lawfully have sex only with his own slave. But a man might plausibly believe that he had ownership rights over his wife's or his son's property, and so think that having sex with their slaves was legal. The Ḥanafī jurists of the Ottoman Empire applied the concept of doubt to exempt prostitution from the hadd penalty. Their rationale was that since legal sex is legitimized, in part, by payment (the dower paid by the husband to the wife upon marriage or the purchase price of a slave), a man might plausibly believe that prostitution, which also involves a payment in return for sexual access, was legal. This principle did not mean that such acts were treated as legal: they remained offenses, and could be punished, but they were not liable for the hadd penalty of 100 lashes or stoning.

=== Sunni practice ===
People who are not muhsan (i.e. a slave, a minor, never married) are punished for zina with one hundred lashes in public.

Maliki school of Islamic jurisprudence considers pregnancy as sufficient and automatic evidence, unless there is evidence of rape. Other Sunni schools of jurisprudence rely on early Islamic scholars who state that a fetus can "sleep and stop developing for 5 years in a womb", and thus a woman who was previously married but now divorced may not have committed zina even if she delivers a baby years after her divorce. They also argue that the woman may have been forced or coerced (see section above, 'Accusation process and punishment'). The position of modern Islamic scholars varies from country to country. For example, in Malaysia which officially follows the Shafi'i fiqh, Section 23(2) through 23(4) of the Syariah (Sharia) Criminal Offences (Federal Territories) Act 1997 state,

Section 23(2) – Any woman who performs sexual intercourse with a man who is not her lawful husband shall be guilty of an offence and shall on conviction be liable to a fine not exceeding five thousand ringgit or to imprisonment for a term not exceeding three years or to whipping not exceeding six strokes or to any combination thereof.

Section 23(3) – The fact that a woman is pregnant out of wedlock as a result of sexual intercourse performed with her consent shall be prima facie evidence of the commission of an offence under subsection (2) by that woman.

Section 23(4) – For the purpose of subsection (3), any woman who gives birth to a fully developed child within a period of six qamariah months from the date of her marriage shall be deemed to have been pregnant out of wedlock.

— Islamic Laws of Malaysia

Minimal proof for zina is still the testimony of four male eyewitnesses, even in the case of homosexual intercourse.

Prosecution of extramarital pregnancy as zina, as well as prosecution of rape victims for the crime of zina, have been the source of worldwide controversy in recent years.

=== Shi'a practice ===
Again, minimal proof for zina is the testimony of four male eyewitnesses. The Shi'is, however, also allow the testimony of women if there is at least one male witness, testifying together with six women. All witnesses must have seen the act in its most intimate details, i.e. the penetration (like "a stick disappearing in a kohl container," as the fiqh books specify). If their testimonies do not satisfy the requirements, they can be sentenced to eighty lashes for unfounded accusation of fornication (kadhf). If the accused freely admits the offense, the confession must be repeated four times, just as in Sunni practice. Pregnancy of a single woman is also sufficient evidence of her having committed zina.

== Human rights controversy ==
Muslim-majority regions with zina laws against consensual premarital and extramarital sex.

The zina and rape laws of countries under Sharia law are the subjects of a global human rights debate.

Hundreds of women in Afghan jails are victims of rape or domestic violence. This has been criticized as leading to "hundreds of incidents where a woman subjected to rape, or gang rape, was eventually accused of zināʾ" and incarcerated.

Iran has prosecuted many cases of zina, and enforced public stoning to death of those accused between 2001 and 2010.

Zina laws are one of many items of reform and secularization debate with respect to Islam. In the early 20th century, under the influence of the colonial era, many penal laws and criminal justice systems were reformed away from Sharia in Muslim-majority parts of the world. By contrast, in the second half of the 20th century, after respective independence, a number of governments including Pakistan, Malaysia and Iran have reverted to Sharia with traditional interpretations of Islam's sacred texts. Zina and hudud laws have been re-enacted and enforced.

Contemporary human rights activists refer to this as a new phase in the politics of gender in Islam, the battle between forces of traditionalism and modernism in the Muslim world, and the use of religious texts of Islam through state laws to sanction and practice gender-based violence.

In contrast to human rights activists, Islamic scholars and Islamist political parties consider 'universal human rights' arguments as impositions of a non-Muslim culture on Muslim people, a disrespect of customary cultural practices and sexual codes that are central to Islam. Zina laws come under hudud – seen as a crime against Allah; the Islamists refer to this pressure and proposals to reform zina and other laws as contrary to Islam. Attempts by international human rights to reform religious laws and codes of Islam have become the Islamist rallying platforms during political campaigns.

== In popular culture ==
- The Stoning of Soraya M. – A 2008 Persian-language American drama film adapted from French-Iranian journalist Freidoune Sahebjam's 1990 book La Femme Lapidée, regarding to a mistaken-punishment of a false zina accusation.

== See also ==
- Islamic criminal jurisprudence
- Islamic family jurisprudence
- Islamic sexual jurisprudence
- Modesty in Islam
- Namus
- Nikah mut‘ah
- Nikah urfi
- Ma malakat aymanukum and sex
- Rajm
- Islamic views on sin
- Taqwa
- Repentance in Islam
- Sex and the law
- Concubinage in Islam
