= Fasiq =

Arabic term referring to someone who violates Islamic law

Fasiq (Arabic: فاسق fāsiq) is an Arabic term referring to someone who violates Islamic law. As a fasiq is considered unreliable, his testimony is not accepted in Islamic courts. The terms fasiq and fisq are sometime rendered as "impious", "venial sinner", or "depraved".

Constant committing of minor sins or the major sins that do not require greater punishment, which are described as wickedness in fiqh (Islamic jurisprudence) terminology, are punished by the judge's discretion, without a certain limit and measure.

In tazir punishments, there is no obligation to prove the crime by witnessing or similar mechanisms.

== Origin ==
Fasiq is derived from the term fisq (Arabic: فسق), "breaking the agreement" or "to leave or go out of".

In its original Quranic usage, the term did not have the specific meaning of a violator of laws, and was more broadly associated with kufr ("disbelief"). Some theologians have associated fasiq-related behaviour to ahl al-hawa ("people of caprice").

== Theological debate ==
- The jurist Wasil ibn Ata (700–748 CE) submitted that a fasiq remained a member of Muslim society, so retained rights to life and property though he could not hold a religious position. This opinion set him at odds with Murji'ah jurists who considered a fasiq to be a munafiq ("hypocrite"), and the Kharijites who considered the fasiq a kafir.
- To the Kharijites "faith without works" was worthless, so one who professed Islam yet sinned was fasiq, and thus a kafir.

== Applications ==
In the period leading up to the 1979 Iranian Revolution, Ayatollah Khomeini described Iranian Shah Mohammad Reza Pahlavi as fasiq.

== See also ==
- Sharia
- Munafiq
- Kafir
- Glossary of Islam
- Outline of Islam
- Index of Islam-related articles
