= Diya (Islam) =

Retaliatory compensation in Islamic law

Diya (Arabic: دية; pl.: diyāt, Arabic: ديات) in Islamic law, is the financial compensation paid to the victim or heirs of a victim in the cases of killing, bodily harm or property damage not done deliberately. It is an alternative punishment to qisas (equal retaliation). In Arabic, the word means both blood money and ransom, and it is transcribed sometimes as diya or diyeh.

Diya compensation rates have historically varied based on the gender and religion of the victim and whether they are free or slave. (If a killing is intentional, qisas (execution) and not diyah applies unless the family of the victim pardons the killer.)

In the modern era, diya plays a role in the legal system of Iran, Pakistan, Saudi Arabia and the United Arab Emirates.

In Iran, the diya for recognized religious minorities (Zoroastrians, Jews, and Christians, with the exception of evangelical Protestants) is half that of a Muslim man. In Iran the diya for Muslim women in insurance claims, such as the loss of life in automobile accidents, is equal to that of a Muslim man, but is half of that of a Muslim man in certain cases.

In Pakistan, the diya is the same for Muslims and non-Muslims, while in Saudi Arabia it differs depending on the religion of the victim. Diyat in Saudi Arabia is the market value of 100 adult camels or their equivalent, which is currently 300,000 to 400,000 riyals. In 2021, Hefazat-e-Islam Bangladesh demanded from the contemporary Bangladesh government 20 to 40 million taka as diyat, equivalent to the value of 100 camels, for each of their slain members.

== Basis in Scripture ==
The Qur'an specifies the principle of Qisas (i.e. retaliation) and compensation (diyah) in cases where one Muslim kills another Muslim.

It is not for a believer [Muslim] to kill a believer unless (it be) by mistake. He who hath killed a believer by mistake must set free a believing slave, and pay the diya to the family of the slain unless they remit it as a charity. If he (the victim) be of a people hostile unto you, and he is a believer, then (the penance is) to set free a believing slave. And if he cometh of a folk between whom and you there is a covenant, then the diya must be paid unto his folk and (also) a believing slave must be set free. And whoso hath not the wherewithal must fast two consecutive months. A penance from Allah. Allah is Knower, Wise.

— Quran 4:92

Hadiths also mention it:

Narrated Abu Juhaifa: I asked 'Ali "Do you have anything Divine literature besides what is in the Qur'an?" Or, as Uyaina once said, "Apart from what the people have?" 'Ali said, "By Him Who made the grain split (germinate) and created the soul, we have nothing except what is in the Quran and the ability (gift) of understanding Allah's Book which He may endow a man, with and what is written in this sheet of paper." I asked, "What is on this paper?" He replied, "The legal regulations of blood-money [diya] and the (ransom for) releasing of the captives, and the judgment that no Muslim should be killed in Qisas (equality in punishment) for killing a Kafir (disbeliever)."

— Sahih al-Bukhari, 9:83:50

Narrated Hisham's father: 'Umar asked the people, "Who heard the Prophet giving his verdict regarding abortions?" Al-Mughira said, "I heard him judging that a male or female slave should be given as a blood-money [diya]. 'Umar said, "Present a witness to testify your statement." Muhammad bin Maslama said, "I testify that the Prophet gave such a judgment."

— Sahih al-Bukhari, 9:83:42, see also Sahih al-Bukhari, 9:83:36, 9:83:41, 9:83:45

Umar ibn Abd al-Aziz, an early caliph admired for his piety and scholarship, ruled on Diya:

Yahya related to me from Malik that he heard that Umar ibn Abd al-Aziz gave a decision that when a Jew or Christian was killed, his blood-money was half the blood-money [diya] of a free Muslim.

— Al-Muwatta, 43 15.8b

== In traditional Islamic law ==
Islamic law treats homicide and unintentional homicide (not just bodily injury and property damage), as a civil dispute between believers, rather than corrective punishment by the state to maintain order. The offender must either face equal retaliation known as Qisas ("Life for life, eye for eye, nose for nose, ear for ear, tooth for tooth, and wounds equal for equal." Quran 5:45), pay diyat to the victim or heirs of the victim, or be forgiven by the victim or victim's heir(s).

In all cases of death, injury, and damage, under traditional sharia doctrine, the prosecutor is not the state but only the victim or the victim's heir (or owner, in the case when the victim is a slave). Diyah is similar in practice to "out-of-court settlement" in a tort case, but with important differences. Under sharia practice, tort-like civil liability settlement is limited to property damage, while in the cases of bodily injury and death, the "blood money" diyah compensation is fixed by a formula (such as the value of certain number of camels). The victim, victim's heir or guardian may alternatively forgive the bodily injury or murder as an act of religious charity (expiation of their own past sins).

The value of diyat, under all schools of sharia, varied with the victim's religion, gender and legal status (free or slave). For a free male Muslim, the diyah value of their life was traditionally set as the value of 100 camels. This was valued at 1000 dinars or 12000 dirhams, corresponding to 4.25 kilograms of gold, or 29.7 to 35.64 kilograms of silver. The diyah value in case the victim was a non-Muslim (Dhimmi) or slave varied in the sharia of different schools of Islamic law, and what religion the victim was.

Diyah must be paid by the murderer or the estate of the murderer. In some cases, such as when the murderer is a juvenile, the diyah is owed by the family of the murderer (Aqila). In other cases, the group ('Aqila) that must pay diyah to the victim or victim's heirs is the tribe or urban neighbors of the culprit.

=== Diyah for Non-Muslims ===
Diyah is not the same for non-Muslims and Muslims in sharia courts. In cases of unintentional crimes, Muslims and non-Muslims are treated differently in the sentencing process.

In early history of Islam, there were considerable disagreements in Muslim jurist opinions on applicability of qisas and diyah when a Muslim murdered a non-Muslim (dhimmi, musta'min or a slave).

Jurists of different schools of Islamic jurisprudence assign different values to non-Muslims. According to the Hanbali sharia, the life of a Christian or Jew is worth half that of a Muslim, and thus the diyah awarded by modern-era Hanbali courts is half that awarded in case of Muslim's death. Maliki fiqh also consider the life of a Christian or Jew to be worth half a Muslim's life, but Shafi'i schools of jurisprudence consider it to be worth a third that of a Muslim. The legal schools of Hanbali, Maliki and Shafi'i Sunni Islam as well as those of Shia Islam have considered the life of polytheists and atheists as one-fifteenth the value of a Muslim during sentencing.

Most scholars of Hanafi school of sharia ruled that, if a Muslim killed a dhimmi, qisas was applicable against the Muslim, but this could be averted by paying a diyah. In one case, the Hanafi jurist Abu Yusuf initially ordered qisas when a Muslim killed a dhimmi, but under Caliph Harun al-Rashid's pressure replaced the order with diyah if the victim's family members were unable to prove the victim was paying jizya willingly as a dhimmi. The Maliki, Shafi'i and Hanbali code of sharia have historically ruled that Qisas does not apply against a Muslim, if he murders any non-Muslim (including dhimmi) or a slave for any reason.

A diyah was payable instead. The early Hanafi jurists considered the payable diyah for Muslim and non-Muslim victims to be same, while the Maliki and Hanbali schools considered a non-Muslim value of life as worth half of a Muslim, and the Shafi'i school considered it worth a third. The Ja'fari school considered a non-Muslim victim's value to be only 800 dirhams in contrast to 10000 dirhams for a Muslim victim. The compensation value payable to the owner of a slave by a Muslim murderer, was the market price paid for the slave.

In the Hanafi and Maliki sharia doctrines, a diyah was not payable to a non-Muslim from a murderer's estate, if the murderer dies for natural or other causes during the trial.

If the victim was musta'min (non-Muslim foreigner visiting), or an apostate (converting from Islam to another religion), neither diya nor qisas applied against the Muslim who killed the victim. But Abdul Aziz bin Mabrouk Al-Ahmadi narrates that the Hanafi scholars say that Musta'min is entitled to Diyya equal to Diyya of a Muslim, and he quotes this opinion from a group of other Muslim scholars, including some of the Companions of the Prophet, and he also narrates that this is one of the opinions of the Hanbalis if the killing occurred intentionally.

== Application in contemporary Muslim countries ==
In the modern era, diya plays a role in the legal system of Iran, Pakistan, Saudi Arabia and the United Arab Emirates. For example, in Saudi Arabia, the heirs of a Muslim victim have a right to settle for Diya instead of the execution of the murderer.

The amount of diya is calculated differently by different states where it makes part of the legal code. In Pakistan and Saudi Arabia, the amount is determined by the judge. In the United Arab Emirates, the government negotiates the amount with the family or heirs of the victim on behalf of the offender. In Iran, the family or heirs of the victim negotiate it directly with the offender.

In Pakistan, the diya for Muslim citizens, non-Muslim citizens and foreigners is the same. Iran made the diya for Muslims and non-Muslims equal in 2003. Nonetheless, the diyah compensation rights of Muslims and non-Muslims have varied among Muslim nations and were unequal in some countries in the late 20th century, remaining unequal in the 2010s in Saudi Arabia.

The customary law of the Somali people also recognizes the obligation of diyah, but defines it as being between subgroups, or mag, who may be part of different clans or even the same clan.

Some of these countries also define, by lawful legislation, a hierarchy of compensation rates for the lives of people; religious affiliation and gender are usually the main modulating factors for these Blood Money rates.

=== Saudi Arabia ===
In Saudi Arabia, when a person kills another, intentionally or unintentionally, the prescribed blood money must be decided by sharia court. The amount of compensation is based on the percentage of responsibility. Blood money is to be paid not only for murder, but also in the case of unnatural death, interpreted to mean death in a fire, industrial or road accident, for instance, as long as the responsibility for it falls on the accused. The diyah compensation amount depends on the religion of the victim.

Human Rights Watch and United States' Religious Freedom Report note that in sharia courts of Saudi Arabia, "The calculation of accidental death or injury compensation is discriminatory. In the event a court renders a judgment in favor of a plaintiff who is a Jewish or Christian male, the plaintiff is only entitled to receive 50 percent of the compensation a Muslim male would receive; all other non-Muslims (Buddhists, Hindus, Jains, Sikhs, Animists, Atheists) are only entitled to receive one-sixteenth of the amount a male Muslim would receive".

While Saudi judges have the last say in any settlement, as of 2011, diya price for a Muslim man, in Saudi Arabia, was SR300,000 ($80,000) for an accidental death and SR400,000 ($106,666) in premeditated murder. (The price was raised that year due to a rise in the price of camels.)

Diyah in Saudi has been controversial, as in a 2013 case, where a father molested and murdered his five-year-old daughter, but avoided jail by paying money to her mother.

=== Iran ===
During the four haraam months; namely Dhu al-Qi'dah, Dhu al-Hijjah, Muharram, and Rajab; when wars and killings were traditionally discouraged in the Arabian Peninsula and later in the larger Islamic world, the blood money rates is increased by a third.

Iran's 1991 Islamic Penal Code originally only specified the diya for a Muslim man. In the absence of a specification of diya for non-Muslims, Iranian judges referred to traditional Shi'ite fiqh. In 2003, Article 297 of the 1991 Code was amended according to a fatwa by Ayatollah Khamenei. This resulted in recognition of equal diya for Muslims and non-Muslims. However, according to the 2006 US State Department Religious Freedom Report on Iran, women and Baháʼís were excluded from the equalization provisions of 2003 and that Baháʼí blood was considered "Mobah, meaning it can be spilled with impunity". The 2013 Islamic Penal Code (which replaced the 1991 code), recognizes the equality between Muslims and non-Muslims in article 554. The 2013 penal code also makes diya for men and women equal in cases of homicide. However, according to Mohammad H. Tavana, it is unclear if the diya between men and women is equal in cases of bodily harm; that has been left to the Iranian courts to decide.

=== Iraq ===
In Iraq, the Bedouin tribes carry on the practice of demanding blood money, though this does not necessarily obviate the proceedings of the secular judicial system.

=== Pakistan ===
Pakistan, which is predominantly a Sunni Muslim nation, introduced Qisas and Diyat Ordinance in 1990, amending sections 229 to 338 of Pakistan Penal code. The new Ordinance replaced British era criminal laws on bodily hurt and murder with sharia-compliant provisions, as demanded by the Shariat Appellate Bench of Pakistan's Supreme Court. The Criminal Procedure Code was also amended to give legal heirs of a murdered person to enter into compromise and accept diyah compensation, instead of demanding qisas-based retaliatory penalties for murder or bodily hurt. The democratically elected government of Nawaz Sharif, in 1997, replaced the Ordinance by enacting the qisas and diyah sharia provisions as the law, through an Act of its Parliament. The sharia-compliant Qisas and Diyat law made murder a private offense, not a crime against society or state, and thus the pursuit, prosecution, and punishment for murder has become the responsibility of the victim's heirs and guardians. The Pakistan Penal Code modernized the Hanafi doctrine of qisas and diya by eliminating distinctions between Muslims and non-Muslims.

Controversies arising from the Diyat law of Pakistan involve cases of honor killings of girls, where the killers were employed by the same family members of the victim who under the Diyyah law have the power to forgive the killer. The loophole was corrected in 2016. Another issue is the intentional murder or bodily harm of poor people by wealthy individuals, where the only punishment the perpetrators suffer is paying monetary compensation that constitutes a small fraction of their income or wealth.

=== Somalia, Djibouti & Somaliland ===
Somalis whether in Djibouti, Somalia or Somaliland are all predominantly Sunni Muslim. Different groups within Somali society undertake oral agreements with each other to define xeer law. Despite this informal nature, there is a series of generally accepted principles, agreements, and ideas that constitute xeer, referred to collectively as "xissi adkaaday".

Diya is one of these principles and is referred to in Somali as mag. It is generally paid by the collective group (clan, sub-clan, lineage, or mag group) from which an offender originates as compensation for the crimes of murder, bodily assault, theft, rape, and defamation of character, given to the victim or victim's family.Mag payment most often takes the form of livestock usually camels which are found in the highest concentration in Somali inhabited territories and prized as a measure of wealth. As such victims will readily accept the animal as a form of compensation.

== Related concepts ==
Daaif notes that a concept similar to diyah was present in pre-Islamic Arabia, where it was paid in terms of goods or animals rather than cash. At least one western scholar of Islam (Joseph Schacht) translates diya as weregeld (Weregeld is also known as "man price", and was a value placed on every being and piece of property to be paid—in the case of loss—as restitution to the victim's family or to the owner of the property. It was used, for example in the Frankish Salic Code).

== See also ==
- Blood money
- Éraic
- Galanas
- Główszczyzna
- Hudud
- Qisas
- Sharia
- Weregild
- Zina
