= Hudud =

Category of prescribed punishments in Islamic law

In traditional Islamic jurisprudence, Hudud (also transliterated as Hadood, Hadud, Hudood, Arabic: حدود, romanized: ḥudūd; sing.: Hadd Arabic: حد), meaning "borders, boundaries, limits", refers to punishments (ranging from public lashing, public stoning to death, amputation of hands, crucifixion, depending on the crime), for several specific crimes (drinking alcohol, illicit sexual intercourse, false accusations of adultery, theft, apostasy from Islam, highway robbery) for which punishments have been determined by verses of Quran or hadith.

Hudud is one of three categories of crime and punishment in classical Islamic literature, the other two being Qisas ("eye for an eye") or Diya (paying victims compensation), and Ta'zeer (punishment left to the judge's or ruler's discretion). Hudud are crimes "against God", and cover the punishments given to those who exceed the "limits of God" (hududullah), associated with the Quran and in some cases inferred from hadith. (Qisas, Diya, and Ta'zeer deal with "crimes against man".)

Hudud crimes cannot be pardoned by the victim or by the state and the punishments must be carried out in public, but in traditional practice were rarely implemented because the evidentiary standards were so high, Offenders who escaped a hudud punishment could still receive a ta'zir sentence.

These punishments were applied throughout most of Islamic history, replaced in many parts of the Islamic world in the 19th century by European-inspired models, and then restored in the late 20th to early 21st century in several Muslim-majority states as a result of the Islamic revival and calls by Islamists for full implementation of Sharia. In the 21st century, hudud, including amputation of limbs, is part of the legal systems of Afghanistan, Brunei, Iran, Mauritania, Saudi Arabia, the United Arab Emirates, Yemen, and the northern part of Nigeria.

== Scriptural basis ==
Hudud offenses with prescribed punishments are mentioned in the Quran. The punishments for these offenses are drawn from both the Quran and the Sunnah. The Quran does not define the offenses precisely: their definitions were elaborated in fiqh (Islamic jurisprudence).

Hududullah, or the "limits of God", is a phrase found several times in the Quran, but not as a label for a particular type of crime. The Quran warns Muslims of the sin of transgressing the limits, which should not even be approached (Quran 2:187). But nowhere does the phrase appear in the clear context of labeling certain crimes (see Quran, 2:229, 4:14, 58:4, 65:1), though 4:14 is followed by discussion of sexual impropriety.

=== Quran ===
The Qur'an describes several crimes determined by scholars as hudud and in some cases sets out punishments.

==== Theft (sariqa) ====
The hudud crime of theft is referred to in Quran verse 5:38:

As for male and female thieves, cut off their hands for what they have done—a deterrent from Allah. And Allah is Almighty, All-Wise.

— Surah Al-Ma'idah 5:38

==== Hirabah ====
The crime of waging war against Allah and His Messenger and spreading mischief in the land is traditionally thought to be referred to in verse 5:33, but while the verse gives punishments for the crime, it does not explain what it is, its "constituent elements, modes of crime and conditions". It is often defined by scholars as "robbery and civil disturbance against Islam" inside a Muslim state:

Indeed, the penalty for those who wage war against Allah and His Messenger and spread mischief in the land is death, crucifixion, cutting off their hands and feet on opposite sides, or exile from the land. This ˹penalty˺ is a disgrace for them in this world, and they will suffer a tremendous punishment in the Hereafter.

— Surah Al-Ma'idah 5:33

==== Zina ====
The crime of illicit consensual sex (zina) is referred to in several verses, including Quran 24:2: The Quran gives lashing as the punishment, not stoning; stoning being found in hadith.

As for female and male fornicators, give each of them one hundred lashes, and do not let pity for them make you lenient in ˹enforcing˺ the law of Allah, if you ˹truly˺ believe in Allah and the Last Day. And let a number of believers witness their punishment.

— Surah An-Nur 24:2

==== Qadhf ====
The crime of "accusation of illicit sex against chaste women without four witnesses" (qadhf) has a hudud punishment based on several Quranic verses, including 24:4, 24:6.

Those who accuse chaste women ˹of adultery˺ and fail to produce four witnesses, give them eighty lashes ˹each˺. And do not ever accept any testimony from them——for they are indeed the rebellious—

— Surah An-Nur 24:4 (Note: see also Quran 24:6, 9:66, 16:106)

==== Drinking alcohol ====
The crime of drinking alcohol is referred to in Quranic verse 5:90, (the hudud punishment however, is described in hadiths):

O believers! Intoxicants, gambling, idols, and drawing lots for decisions are all evil of Satan's handiwork. So shun them so you may be successful.

— Surah Al-Ma'idah 5:90

=== Hadiths ===
In some cases Islamic scholars have used hadiths to establish hudud punishments, which are not mentioned in the Quran. Thus, stoning as punishment for zina is based on hadiths that narrate episodes where Muhammad and his successors prescribed it.

Sahih hadith are "sound" hadith. Hadith are the sayings, practices and traditions of Muhammad as observed by his companions, and compiled by scholars. Sahih hadith are considered by Sunni Muslims to be the most trusted source of Islamic law after the Quran. They extensively describe hudud crimes and punishments. The tendency to use existence of a shubha (lit. doubt, uncertainty) to avoid hudud punishments is based on a hadith that states "avert hadd punishment in case of shubha".

== Hudud offences and punishments ==
=== Difference in number ===
Sources differ as to how many Hudud crimes there are. According to at least one scholar (Muhammad Shafi) there are just five hudud crimes in shariah -- (1) Robbery, (2) Theft, (3) Adultery, (4) False Accusation of Adultery, plus one more, drinking wine—added as a result of the consensus (Ijma`) of the Companions of Muhammad. Article One of the Penal Code of the state of Qatar lists six hudud punishments, adding apostasy to those of Muhammad Shafi. Hajed A. Alotaibi in his book on Minor Crimes in Saudi Arabia, states that Hudud "generally" covers seven crimes, adding "rebellion" to the Qatar list of crimes.

=== Offenses ===
The offences subject to hudud punishment:

- Theft (sariqa, السرقة). Punished with amputation of a hand.
- Illicit sexual intercourse (zina, الزنا). Includes pre-marital sex and extra-marital sex. Although the punishment for zina mentioned in the Quran is lashing, not stoning, all schools of traditional jurisprudence agreed on the basis of hadith that the offense is to be punished by stoning if the offender is muhsan (adult, free, Muslim, and married or previously married). Lashing is the penalty for offenders who are not muhsan, i.e. they do not meet all of the above criteria. The offenders must have acted of their own free will. Classification of homosexual intercourse as zina differs according to legal school. Some understandings tend to add homosexual relationships to these crimes, which are defined as an evil act in the Qur'an with an undefined response such as "punish/discipline them" (4ː16).
- False accusation of zina (qadhf, القذف). Punished by 80 lashes. (See: The Necklace Incident)
- Drinking alcohol (shurb al-khamr). Punished by 40 to 80 lashes, depending on the legal school. This is a Hadd crime "on the basis of a consensus (Ijma`)" of the Companions of Muhammad.
- Apostasy from Islam, i.e. leaving Islam for another religion or none at all, is regarded as one of hudud crimes liable to capital punishment in traditional Maliki, Hanbali and Shia jurisprudence, but not in Hanafi and Shafi'i fiqh, though these schools also regard apostasy as a grave crime whose punishment is death.

Apostasy from Islam is condemned in the Quran, but the punishments prescribed are in the afterlife (except that we are asked to "not accept their testimony forever") and do not include execution. However the classical understanding of sharia punishes them with death. Furthermore, some interpretations include acts such as failure to worship ("abandoning prayer and alms") as evidence of apostasy and punishable by death. (See: Ridda wars)

- Banditry, highway robbery (qat'al tariq) is a crime in Islam but one that jurists have differed on as to whether it is hiraba and a hudud crime. Although hiraba and the punishment for it is mentioned in the Quran, it is narrated that Muhammad applied retaliation (Qisas), which is a method based on the Quran, for a similar situation, not what is stated in the relevant (5:33) verse. (Note: The Prophet Muhammad ordered the killers punished in exactly the same way. Yet prominent scholars were skeptical of reports that he had actually ordered the murderers' hands or feet to cut off.)T
- Fasad, (mischief in the land, moral corruption against Allah, social disturbance, creating disorder within the Muslim state), rebellion against a lawful Islamic ruler (baghi) / hirabah, qat' al-tariq or fasad.Verse Al-Ma'idah 33, describes the crime of hirabah. How it would should be understood is a matter of debate even today. The verse talks about the punishment of criminals by killing, hanging, having their hands and feet cut off on opposite sides, and being exiled from the earth, in response to an abstract crime such as "fighting against Allah and his messenger".
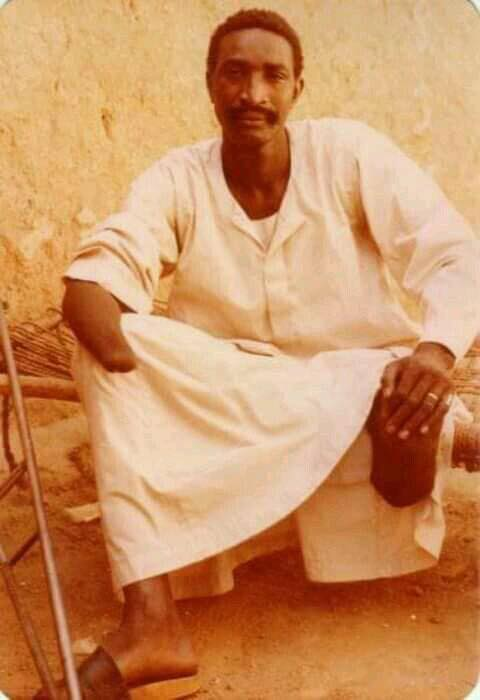
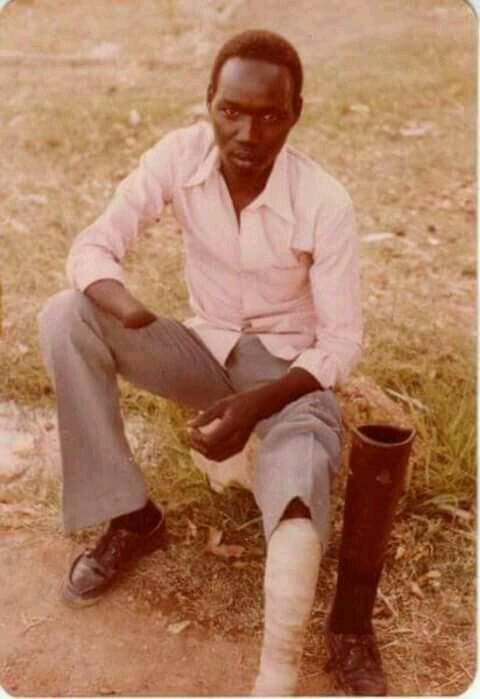
Cross amputation survivors, Adam Ismaeel (left) and Ibrahim Osman (right), of the September 1983 Laws in Sudan, pictured in 1986; the amputees were allegedly guilty of declared "war against Allah and the Prophet".

Punished with death followed by crucifixion, amputation of the right hand and the left foot (the combined right-left double amputation procedure is known as the ancient punishment of "cross-amputation") or banishment. Different punishments are prescribed for different scenarios and there are differences of opinion regarding specifics within and between legal schools. Expanding or narrowing the conditions and scope of this crime according to new situations and universal standards are issues that continue to be discussed today.

==== Differences among schools ====
There are a number of differences in views between the different madhhabs with regard to the punishments appropriate in specific situations and the required process before they are carried out. There are also legal differences (ikhtilaf) over the term limitation of pronouncing the punishment. Hanafite scholars assert that punishment for hadd crimes other than qadhf (false accusation of illegal sex) have to be implemented within a month; except for witnesses with a valid legal justifications for delayed testimony or in cases of self-confession.

Marja' following Shia jurisprudence generally believe that hudud punishments can be changed by appropriately qualified jurists.

==== Nonhudud crimes ====
Murder, injury and property damage are not hudud crimes in Islamic criminal jurisprudence, and are subsumed under other categories of Islamic penal law in Iran which are:

- Qisas (meaning retaliation, and following the principle of "eye for an eye"), and Diya ("blood money", financial compensation paid to the victim or heirs of a victim in the cases of murder, bodily harm or property damage. Diyyah is an alternative to Qisas for the same class of crimes).
- Ta'zeer – punishment administered at the discretion of the judge.

== History ==
Because the stringent traditional restrictions on application of hudud punishments, they were rarely applied historically. Criminals who escaped hudud punishments could still be sanctioned under the system of tazir, which gave judges and high officials discretionary sentencing powers to punish crimes that did not fall under the categories of hudud and qisas. In practice, since early on in Islamic history, criminal cases were usually handled by ruler-administered courts or local police using procedures that were only loosely related to Sharia. During the 19th century, Sharia-based criminal laws were replaced by statutes inspired by European models nearly everywhere in the Islamic world, except some particularly conservative regions such as the Arabian peninsula.

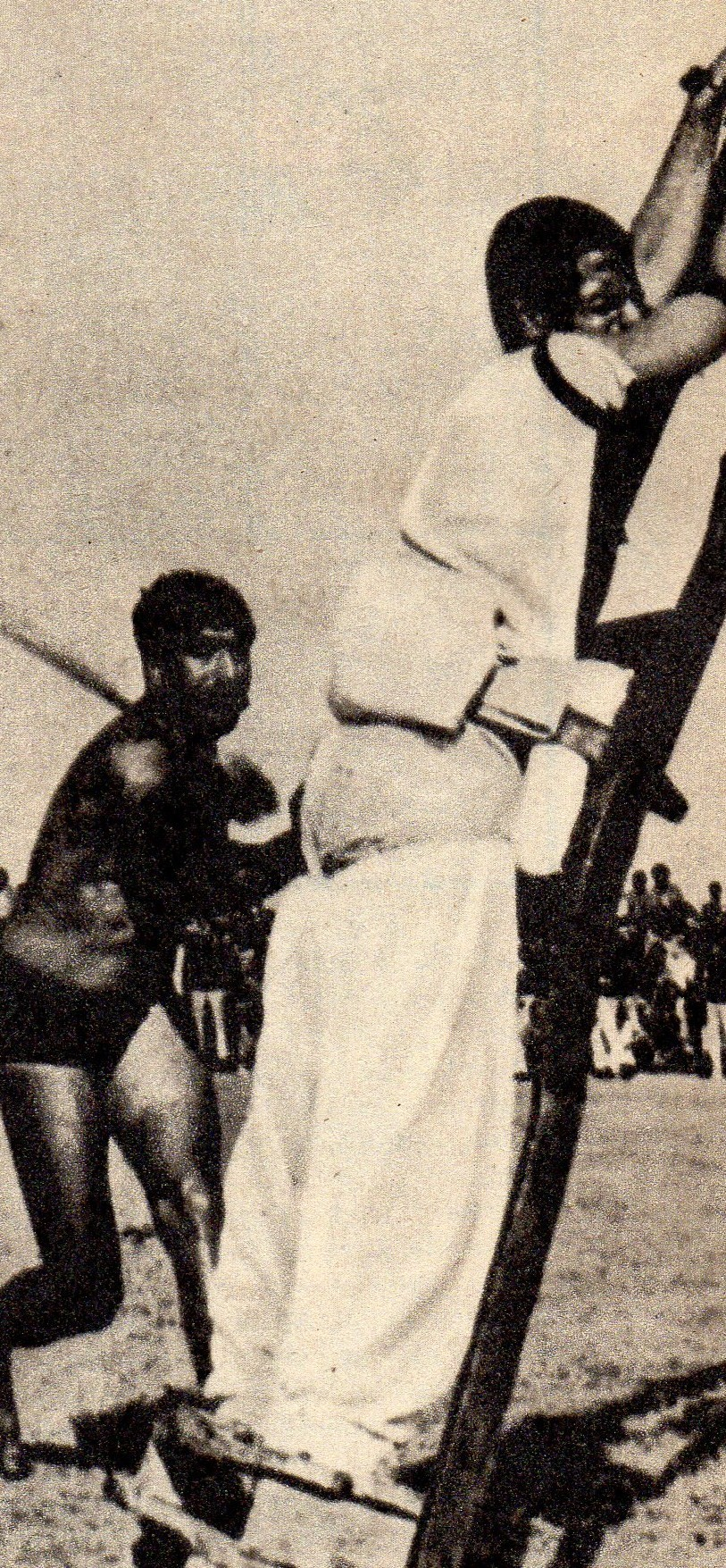
Flogging of a man who seduced a woman in Islamabad, Pakistan (1970s)

=== Post-colonial era ===
The Islamic revival of the late 20th century brought along calls by Islamist movements for full implementation of Sharia. Reinstatement of hudud punishments has had particular symbolic importance for these groups because of their Quranic origin, but in countries where hudud have been incorporated into the legal code under Islamist pressure, the punishments have often been used sparingly or not at all, depending on local political climate.

By 2013 about a dozen of the 50 or so Muslim-majority countries had made hudud applicable, with many countries disregarding traditional strict requirements. In 1979 Pakistan instituted the Hudood Ordinances. In July 1980 Iran stoned to death four offenders in Kerman. By the late 1980s, Mauritania and Sudan had "enacted laws to grant courts the power to hand down hadd penalties". During the 1990s Somalia, Yemen, Afghanistan, and northern Nigeria followed suit. In 1994 the Iraqi president Saddam Hussein (who had persecuted and executed many Islamists), issued a decree "ordering that robbers and car thieves should lose their hands". Brunei adopted hudud laws in 2014.

Enforcement of hudud punishments has varied from country to country. In Pakistan and Libya, hudud punishments have not been applied at all because of strict evidentiary requirements. In Nigeria local courts have passed several stoning sentences for zina, all of which were overturned on appeal and left unenforced because of lack of sufficient evidence.

During the first two years when Sharia was made state law in Sudan (1983 and 1985), a hudud punishment for theft was inflicted on some criminals, and then discontinued though not repealed. Floggings for moral crimes have been carried out since the codification of Islamic law in Sudan in 1991.

==== Zina ====
The hudud punishment for zinā in cases of consensual sex and the punishment of rape victims who failed to prove the coercion, which has occurred in some countries, have been the subject of a global human rights debate.

In 2012 a Sudanese court sentenced Intisar Sharif Abdallah, a teenager (but an adult under Islamic law), to death by stoning in the city of Omdurman under article 146 of Sudan's Criminal Act after charging her with "adultery with a married person". She was held in Omdurman prison with her legs shackled, along with her 5-month-old baby. (She was released on July 3, 2012, after an international outcry.)

In Pakistan many rape victims who have failed to prove accusations have been jailed this has been criticized as leading to "hundreds of incidents where a woman subjected to rape, or gang rape, were eventually accused of zināʾ" and incarcerated. Charles Kennedy states that majority of cases against women jailed on charges of zina in Pakistan are filed by their family members against disobedient daughters and estranged wives as harassment suits. Hundreds of women in Afghanistan jails are victims of rape or domestic violence, accused of zina under tazir. In Pakistan, over 200,000 zina cases against women under the Hudood laws were under way at various levels in Pakistan's legal system in 2005. In addition to thousands of women in prison awaiting trial for zina-related charges, rape victims in Pakistan have been reluctant to report rape because they feared being charged with zina. The resulting controversy prompted the law to be amended in 2006, though the amended version has been criticized for continuing to blur the legal distinction between rape and consensual sex.

==== Judicial amputation ====
According to Amnesty International, between 1981 and December 1999 there were at least 90 amputations (although this punishment is not exclusively used to carry out a hudud punishment) and at least five cross-amputations (hand and foot on opposite sides amputated) for judicial punishment. Amputation as punishment is also practiced in Muslim countries like Brunei, the United Arab Emirates, Iran, Saudi Arabia, Yemen, and 11 of the 36 states within Nigeria.

==== Crucifixion ====
Verse Q.5:33 mentions crucifixion (Arabic: الصلب, romanized: aṣ-ṣalib) as among the punishments for waging war against God and His Messenger and spreading corruption in the land. There are different interpretations of crucifixion in Islam, but at least in Saudi Arabia, takes the form of displaying beheaded remains of a perpetrator "for a few hours on top of a pole". They are far fewer in number than executions. One case was that of Muhammad Basheer al-Ranally who was executed and crucified on December 7, 2009, for "spreading disorder in the land" by kidnapping, raping and murdering several young boys. ISIS has also reportedly crucified prisoners.

== Requirements for conviction ==
Confession and eyewitness testimony are the principle means of establishing guilt for hudud crimes. Hudud were famous for seldom being implemented because the evidentiary standards were very high. Based on a hadith, jurists stipulated that hudud punishments should be averted by the slightest doubts or ambiguities. (Note: shubuhat, sing. shubha) Meeting hudud requirements for zina and theft was virtually impossible without a confession in court, which could then be invalidated by a retraction.

=== Illegal sex ===
Certain standards for proof must be met in Islamic law for zina punishment to apply. In the Shafii, Hanbali, and Hanafi schools of fiqh, rajm (public stoning) or lashing is imposed for religiously prohibited sex only if the crime is proven, either by self-confession or by four male adults witnessing at first hand the actual sexual intercourse at the same time in its most intimate details. Shia Islam allows substitution of one male Muslim with two female Muslims, but requires that at least one of the witnesses be a male. The Sunni Maliki school of law consider pregnancy in an unmarried woman as sufficient evidence of zina, unless there is evidence of rape or compulsion. The punishment can be averted by a number of legal "doubts" (shubuhat), however, such as existence of an invalid marriage contract or possibility that the conception predates a divorce. The majority Maliki opinion theoretically allowed for a pregnancy lasting up to seven years, indicating a concern of the jurists to shield women from the charge of zina and to protect children from the stigma of illegitimacy. These requirements made zina virtually impossible to prove in practice.

If a person alleges zina and fails to provide four consistent Muslim witnesses, or if witnesses provide inconsistent testimonies, they can be sentenced to eighty lashes for unfounded accusation of fornication (qadhf), itself a hadd crime." Rape was traditionally prosecuted under legal categories requiring less stringent evidentiary rules. In Pakistan, the Hudood Ordinances of 1979 subsumed prosecution of rape under the category of zina, making rape extremely difficult to prove and exposing the victims to jail sentences for admitting illicit intercourse. The resulting controversy prompted the law to be amended in 2006, though the amended version is still criticized by some for blurring the legal distinction between rape and consensual sex.

=== Theft ===
Malik ibn Anas, the originator of the Maliki judicial school of fiqh, recorded in his work Al-Muwatta a great many detailed circumstances under which the punishment of hand amputation should and should not be carried out.

In his comments on the verse in the Quran on theft, scholar Yusuf Ali asserted that most Islamic jurists believe that "petty thefts are exempt from this punishment", and that "only one hand should be cut off for the first theft." Islamic jurists disagree as to when amputation is mandatory religious punishment.

Another list of restrictions comes from a fatwa given by one Taqī al-Dīn ʿAlī b. ʿAbd al-Kāfī al-Subkī (d. 756/1356), a senior Shafi scholar and judge from one of the leading scholarly families of Damascus. According to Taqi, Hadd [punishment] is only obligatory for perpetrator of a theft for whom the following conditions apply:

1. [the item] was taken from a place generally considered secure (ḥirz)
2. it had not been procured as spoils of war (mughannam)
3. nor from the public treasury
4. and it was taken by his own hand
5. not by some tool or mechanism (āla)
6. on his own
7. while he was of sound mind
8. and of age
9. and a Muslim
10. and free
11. not in the Haram
12. in Mecca
13. and not in the Abode of War
14. and he is not one who is granted access to it from time to time
15. and he stole from someone other than his wife
16. and not from a uterine relative
17. and not from her husband if it is a woman
18. when he was not drunk
19. and not compelled by hunger
20. or under duress
21. and he stole some property that was owned
22. and would be permissible to sell to Muslims
23. and he stole it from someone who had not wrongfully appropriated it
24. and the value of what he stole reached three dirhams of pure silver by the Meccan weight
25. and it was not meat
26. or any slaughtered animal
27. nor anything edible or potable
28. or some fowl or game
29. or a dog
30. or a cat
31. or animal dung
32. or feces (ʿadhira)
33. or dirt
34. or red ochre (maghara)
35. or arsenic (zirnīkh)
36. or pebbles or stones
37. or glass
38. or coals
39. or firewood
40. or reeds (qaṣab)
41. or wood
42. or fruit
43. or a donkey or a grazing animal
44. or a copy of the Quran
45. or a plant pulled up from its roots (min badā'ihi)
46. or produce from a walled garden
47. or a tree
48. or a free person
49. or a slave
50. if they are able to speak and are of sound mind
51. and he had committed no offense against him
52. before he removed him from a place where he had not been permitted to enter
53. from his secure location
54. by his own hand
55. and witness is born
56. to all of the above
57. by two witnesses
58. who are men
59. according to [the requirements and procedure] that we already presented in the chapter on testimony
60. and they did not disagree
61. or retract their testimony
62. and the thief did not claim that he was the rightful owner of what he stole
63. and his left hand is healthy
64. and his foot is healthy
65. and neither body part is missing anything
66. and the person he stole from does not give him what he had stolen as a gift
67. and he did not become the owner of what he stole after he stole it
68. and the thief did not return the stolen item to the person he stole it from
69. and the thief did not claim it
70. and the thief was not owed a debt by the person he stole from equal to the value of what he stole
71. and the person stolen from is present [in court]
72. and he made a claim for the stolen property
73. and requested that amputation occur
74. before the thief could repent
75. and the witnesses to the theft are present
76. and a month had not passed since the theft occurred

Another restriction is that a thief who makes a confession before the testimony be allowed to retract his confession after. For if the thief does that first and then direct evidence (bayyina) is provided of his crime and then he retracts his confession, the punishment of amputation is dropped according to the more correct opinion in the Shafi school, because the establishment [of guilt] came by confession not by the direct evidence. So his retraction is accepted.

== Efficacy ==
=== Amputation ===
Those arguing in favor of that the hudud punishment of amputation for theft often describe the visceral horror/fear of losing a hand as providing strong deterrence against theft, while the numerous restrictions on its application make it seldom used and thus more humane than other punishments. Supporters include Abdel-Halim Mahmoud, the Grand Imam of Al-Azhar from 1973 to 1978, who stated amputation was not only ordained by God but brought law and order to the land when implemented by Ibn Saud in Saudi Arabia — though amputation was carried out only seven times. In his popular book Islam the Misunderstood Religion, Muhammad Qutb asserts that amputation punishment for theft "has been executed only six times throughout a period of four hundred years".

However, according to historian Jonathan A.C. Brown, at least in the mid-1100s in the Iraqi city of Mosul the Muslim jurists found the punishment less than effective. Faced with a crime wave of theft, the ulama "begged their new sultan ... to implement harsh punishments" outside of sharia. The hands of arrested thieves were not being cut off because evidentiary standards were so strict, nor were they deterred by the ten lashes (discretionary punishment or tazir) that Shariah courts were limited to by hadith.

== Disputes and debates over reform ==
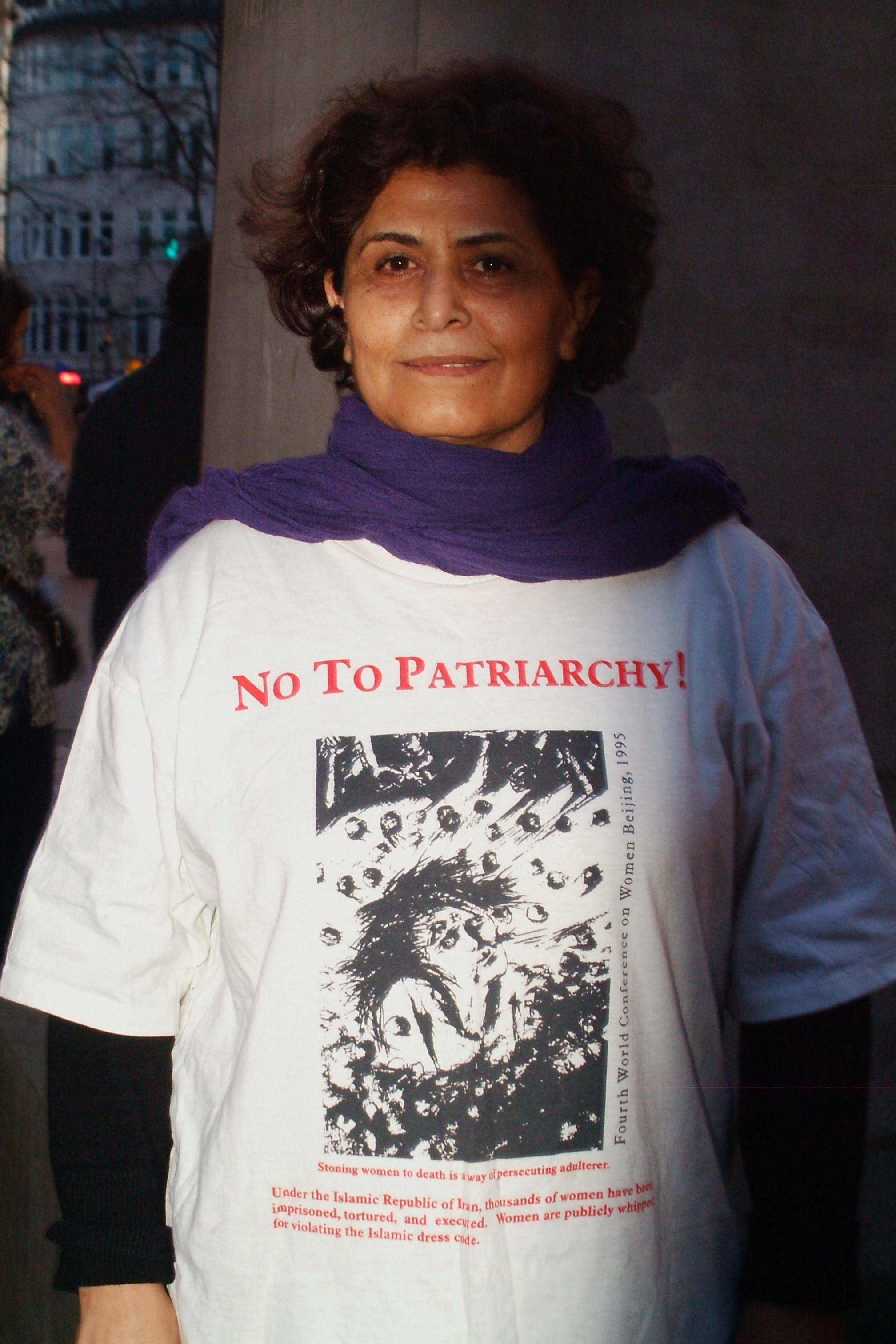
Protests in Hanover against stonings of women in Iran (2012)

A number of scholars/reformers have suggested that traditional hudud penalties "may have been suitable for the age in which Muhammad lived" but are no longer, or that "new expression" for "the underlying religious principles and values" of Hudud should be developed. Tariq Ramadan has called for an international moratorium on the punishments of hudud laws until greater scholarly consensus can be reached.

Many contemporary Muslim scholars think that the hudud punishments are not absolute obligations as they are acts of mu'amalah (non-worship), thus, they think that hudud is the maximum punishment.

Hudud punishments have been called incompatible with international norms of human rights and sometimes simple justice. At least one observer (Sadakat Kadri) has complained that the inspiration of faith has not been a guarantee of justice, citing as an example the execution of two dissidents for "waging war against God" (Moharebeh) in the Islamic Republic of Iran—the dissidents waging war by organizing unarmed political protests. The Hudood Ordinance in Pakistan led to the jailing of thousands of women on zina-related charges, were used to file "nuisance or harassment suits against disobedient daughters or estranged wives". The sentencing to death of women in Pakistan, Nigeria, Sudan for zina caused international uproar, being perceived as not only as too harsh, but a punishment of victims not wrongdoers.

Among the questions critics have raised about the modern application of hudud, include: why, if the seventh-century practice is divine law eternally valid and not to be reformed, have its proponents instituted modern innovations? These include use of general anesthetic for amputation (in Libya, along with instruction to hold off if amputation might "prove dangerous to [the offender's] health"), selective introduction (leaving out crucifixion in Libya and Pakistan), using gunfire to expedite death during stoning (in Pakistan). Another question is why they have been so infrequently applied both historically and recently. There is only one record of a stoning in the entire history of Ottoman Empire, and none at all in Syria during Muslim rule. Modern states that "have so publicly enshrined them over the past few decades have gone to great lengths to avoid their imposition." There was only one amputation apiece in Northern Nigeria and Libya, no stonings in Nigeria. In Pakistan the "country's medical profession collectively refused to supervise amputations throughout the 1980s", and "more than three decades of official Islamization have so far failed to produce a single actual stoning or amputation." (Note: The courts of Pakistan have avoided enforcement of the hadd penalties entirely, extrajudicial lynchings and guerilla activity notwithstanding. Colonel Qaddafi's Libya conducted just one official amputation, in a 2003 case involving a four-man robbery gang. Northern Nigeria has claimed about the same number of hand in total, ... [and] has not carried out any stonings at all. ...) (Saudi Arabia is the exception with four stonings and 45 amputations sentences during the 1980s though they were overturned because of lack of required evidence. As of 1999, Frank Vogel stated that there were four cases of execution by stoning reported between 1981 and 1992, but nothing since. The Thomson Reuters Foundation reports that as of 2013 stoning was legal in Saudi Arabia and offenders had been sentenced to stoning but there were "no reports of stonings being carried out".)

Among two of the leading Islamist movements (the Muslim Brotherhood and Jamaat-e-Islami), the Muslim Brotherhood has taken "a distinctly ambivalent approach" toward hudud penalties with "practical plans to put them into effect ... given a very low priority". In Pakistan, Munawar Hasan, then Ameer (leader) of the Jamaat-e-Islami, has stated that "unless and until we get a just society, the question of punishment is just a footnote."

Supporting hudud punishments are Islamic revivalists such as Abul A'la Maududi (the founder of Jamaat-e-Islami), who writes that in a number of places the Quran "declares that sodomy is such a heinous sin ... that it is the duty of the Islamic State to eradicate this crime and ... punish those who are guilty of it." According to Richard Terrill, hudud punishments are considered claims of God, revealed through Muhammad, and as such immutable, unable to be altered or abolished by people, jurists or parliament.

Opposition to hudud (or at least minimizing of hudud) within the framework of Islam comes in more than one form. Some (such as elements of the MB and JI mentioned above) support making its application wait for the creation of a "just society" where people are not "driven to steal in order to survive." Another follows the Modernist approach calling for hudud and other parts of Sharia to be re-interpreted from the classical form and follow broad guidelines rather than exact all-encompassing prescriptions. Others consider hudud punishments "essentially deterrent in nature" to be applied very, very infrequently.

Others (particularly Quranists) propose excluding ahadith and using only verses in the Quran in formulating Islamic Law, which would exclude stoning (though not amputation, flogging or execution for some crimes). The vast majority of Muslims and most Islamic scholars, however, consider both Quran and sahih hadiths to be a valid source of Sharia, with Quranic verse 33.21, among others, (Note: Quran 3:32, 3:132, 4:59, 8:20, 33:66) as justification for this belief.

Indeed, in the Messenger of Allah you have an excellent example for whoever has hope in Allah and the Last Day, and remembers Allah often. ... It is not for a believing man or woman—when Allah and His Messenger decree a matter—to have any other choice in that matter. Indeed, whoever disobeys Allah and His Messenger has clearly gone ˹far˺ astray.

— Surah Al-Ahzab 33:21–36

== See also ==
- Islamic criminal jurisprudence
- Cairo Declaration on Human Rights in Islam
- Zia-ul-Haq's Islamization
- Hudood Ordinance

== Sources ==
- Kadri, Sadakat (2012). Heaven on Earth: A Journey Through Shari'a Law from the Deserts of Ancient Arabia to the Streets of the Modern Muslim World. Macmillan. ISBN 9780099523277.
- Kennedy, Charles (1996). Islamization of Laws and Economy, Case Studies on Pakistan. Institute of Policy Studies, The Islamic Foundation.
