= Główszczyzna =

Polish form of blood money

Główszczyzna (Polish pronunciation: [ɡwufˈʂt͡ʂɨzna]) in Polish tradition was a name for a fine, paid by a killer or his family to the family of his/her victim. The name is derived from głowa, meaning head.

== See also ==
- Blood money (restitution)
- Diyah
- Éraic
- Galanas
- Weregild
