= Éraic =

Irish blood money

Éraic (or eric) was the Irish equivalent of the Welsh galanas and the Germanic weregild, a form of tribute paid in reparation for murder or other major crimes. The term survived into the sixteenth century as eiric, by then relating only to compensation for the killing of an Irishman. In the case of homicide, if the attacker fled, the fine had to be paid by the tribe to which he belonged and the criminal's soul.

In Irish mythology the éraic takes an important place. In the Oidheadh Chloinne Tuireann, the children of Tuireann owed an éraic to Lugh Lamhfada. Lugh set them a series of seemingly impossible quests as recompense. They achieved them all, but were fatally wounded in completing the last one.

== See also ==
- Blood money (restitution)
- Damages
- Diyah
- Główszczyzna
- Weregild
