= Ameneh Bahrami =

Iranian woman blinded in an acid attack

- Persian: آمنه بهرامی
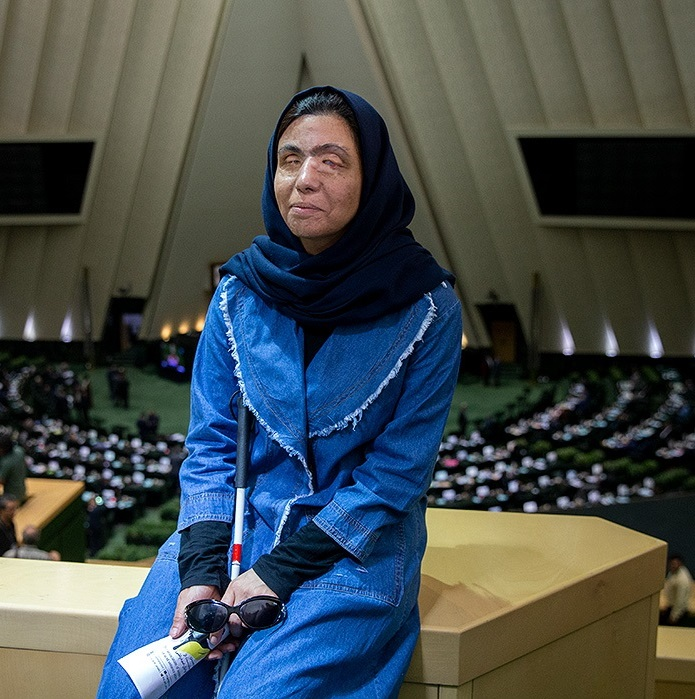
- Ameneh Bahrami in 2019
- Born: 1978 (age 46–47); Tehran, Imperial State of Iran
- Education: Azad University
- Known for: Victim of October 2004 acid attack

Ameneh Bahrami (Persian: آمنه بهرامی; born 1978 in Tehran, Iran) is an Iranian woman blinded in an acid attack. She became the focus of international controversy after demanding that her attacker, Majid Movahedi, be punished by being similarly blinded. The punishment is permitted under the Qisas principle of sharia.

== Attack ==
Movahedi had reportedly been harassing Bahrami, who he had met as a fellow student at Azad University in Eslamshahr, for some time but no police action had been previously taken. Bahrami was walking home from her job at a medical engineering company in October 2004 when he attacked her. She attempted to escape, but Movahedi blocked her path and threw acid in her face. She subsequently underwent 17 surgeries, some in Spain, but remains badly disfigured and blind in both eyes. The Iranian government has paid an equivalent of about £22,500 towards her treatment.

== Trial and response ==
Bahrami testified against Movahedi at his trial. She informed the court that she desired "to inflict the same life on him that he inflicted on me". She requested that twenty drops of acid be dropped in his eyes.

Tehran's deputy public prosecutor, Mahmoud Salarkia, defended the punishment. "If this sentence is properly publicized in the media, it will stop the repetition of such incidents," he said. "Awareness of punishment has a huge deterrent effect in stopping social crimes." Human rights advocates strongly criticized the punishment.

The punishment was due to be carried out on April 15, 2009, Movahedi's appeal was rejected by the court, although the blinding did not take place that year.

A new punishment date of May 14, 2011, was revealed, but again the punishment was not carried out and was postponed indefinitely. On July 31, 2011, Ameneh forgave and pardoned her attacker, stating that she did so for her country.

Movahedi stated that if he were to be blinded, the authorities should also "empty out" Bahrami's eyes to ensure that she could not secretly see.

== Subsequent life ==
Bahrami refused traditional "blood money" from her attacker, as she felt that her attacker deserved harsh retribution for his actions. However, she had no health insurance and her medical bills were high, forcing her to raise money online to help pay for her surgeries. She was described as having become self-sufficient after the attack and had learned how to do tasks such as preparing food and walk to her parents' apartment independently. As of 2010, she lived in Spain.

== See also ==
- Human rights in the Middle East
- Human rights in Iran
- Sharia
