= Fasad =

Arabic term for moral corruption

Fasād (Arabic: فساد /fa.saːd/), or fasaad, is an Arabic word meaning 'rottenness', 'corruption', or 'depravity'. In an Islamic context, it can refer to "spreading corruption on Earth" or "spreading mischief in a Muslim land", moral corruption against Allah, or disturbance of the public peace.

The spread of fasad is a major theme in the Quran, and the notion is often contrasted with islah ("setting things aright"). Classical Quranic commentators commonly interpreted "corruption in the land" as open disobedience against God or its result. In certain contexts, classical jurists took it to refer to the legal category of Hirabah, comprising armed assault, rape and murder. Some contemporary Muslims view destruction of the natural environment to be among the central meanings of verses referring to fasad.

The term has been used in the legal codes of the Islamic Republic of Pakistan and Islamic Republic of Iran. In Iran, laws referencing it have been used to prosecute or threaten political opposition figures.

== In Islamic scripture ==
=== Quran ===
The spread of fasad is a major theme in the Quran, and the notion is often contrasted with islah ("setting things aright").

Terms derived from the verbal root f-s-d appear in a number of Quranic verses. The verb afsad (to cause fasad) appears, for example, in chapter 2 (Al-Baqara), verse 11-12,

When they are told, “Do not spread corruption in the land,” they reply, “We are only peace-makers!” Indeed, it is they who are the corruptors, but they fail to perceive it.

— Surah Al-Baqara 2:11-122

Classical Quranic commentators commonly interpreted spreading "corruption in the land" or "mischief on the earth" as open disobedience against God or its result. Some contemporary Muslims view destruction of the natural environment to be among the central meanings of these verses.

In chapter 5 (Al-Ma'ida) of Qur'an, verse 33 contains the expression "to strive mischievously in the land" (yas'awna fi-l-ardi fasadan):

Indeed, the penalty for those who wage war against Allah and His Messenger and spread mischief in the land is death, crucifixion, cutting off their hands and feet on opposite sides, or exile from the land. This ˹penalty˺ is a disgrace for them in this world, and they will suffer a tremendous punishment in the Hereafter.

— Surah Al-Ma'idah 5:33

The scope of this verse has been limited by most classical commentators to the armed crimes falling under the legal category of Hirabah, which comprises armed robbery, assault (including rape), and murder, particularly of innocent travelers on the road. A "small minority" viewed this verse as applying to apostates in general. This verse follows verses 26-31 which refer to the incident in which Qabil (Cain), son of Adam, killed his brother Habil (Abel).

Those who cause mischief in the land (yufsiduna fi al-ard) are counted as "the losers" in Al-Baqara, verse 27:

those who violate Allah’s covenant after it has been affirmed, break whatever ˹ties˺ Allah has ordered to be maintained, and spread corruption in the land. It is they who are the ˹true˺ losers.

— Surah Al-Baqara 2:27

The word "losers" indicates being bereft of something, and can also mean "being lost", in the sense of losing one's way or one's self.

=== Hadiths ===
Mischief has a broad meaning in Sahih Bukhari and other texts of Islam.

Breaking ties with one's Muslim kith and kin is stated to be a form of fasad in Book 78 of Sahih Bukhari,

The Prophet said, "Allah created the creations, and when He finished from His creations, Ar-Rahm i.e., womb said, "(O Allah) at this place I seek refuge with You from all those who sever me (i.e. sever the ties of Kith and kin). Allah said, 'Yes, won't you be pleased that I will keep good relations with the one who will keep good relations with you, and I will sever the relation with the one who will sever the relations with you.' It said, 'Yes, O my Lord.' Allah said, 'Then that is for you ' " Allah's Messenger added. "Read (in the Qur'an) if you wish, the Statement of Allah: 'Would you then, if you were given the authority, do mischief in the land and sever your ties of kinship?' (47:22)

— Sahih al-Bukhari 5987

Sunan Abu Dawud, in 40:4372, states that the punishment for fasad was revealed for polytheists.

== In modern politics and law ==
=== Pakistan ===
Pakistan law includes the principle of fasad-fil-arz (corruption on earth), which allows an offender to be punished (with a sentence of up to 14 years of imprisonment) even if they are forgiven by the victim's party under Qisas and Diyat.

=== Iran ===
After the Islamic revolution in Iran, suspected royalists were purged from the civil service and the army with justifications that employed the Quranic notions of fasad and fitna. The clerical leadership attempted to present this campaign as analogous to the actions of the Islamic prophet Muhammad and Ali ibn Abi Talib. Acting as the prayer leader of Tehran, Ayatollah Hussein-Ali Montazeri commented that Muhammad was sent by God "to salvage [the inhabitants of Mecca] from corrupted moralities [mafasid akhlaq]". He identified fasad with "plotters, spies and traitors in government offices and institutions" and warned that failure to take action against it would put an end to "the sciences, the arts and progress".

In the Islamic Republic of Iran the offense is known as Mofsed-e-filarz and is a capital crime. The charge was used by Islamic Republican judicial authorities in the early days of the Iranian Revolution, resulting in many imprisonments and executions. Possibly more than 8,000 people suffered that fate, ranging from former members of the Shah's government, leaders of opposition or terrorist groups, or simply opponents of the regime. It has been used against leaders of the Baháʼí Faith on a number of occasions, and in February 2011 a large majority of members of the Iranian parliament called for the prosecution and execution of Iranian opposition leaders Mehdi Karroubi and Mir-Hossein Mousavi on the charge of mofsed-e-filarz.

== See also ==
- Apostasy in Islam
- Corruption
- Mofsed-e-filarz
- War crime
- Maslaha
