= Blood money (restitution) =

Compensation paid by an offender

Blood money, also called bloodwit, is money or some sort of compensation paid by an offender, usually a murderer, or their family group, to the family or kin group of the victim.

== Particular examples and uses ==
Blood money is, colloquially, the reward for bringing a criminal to justice. A common meaning in other contexts is the money-penalty paid by a murderer to the kinsfolk of the victim. These fines completely protect the offender, or the kinsfolk thereof, from the vengeance of the injured family. The weregild compensation system was common among Germanic peoples as part of ancient Germanic law, before the introduction of Christianity.

A scale of payments, graduated according to the heinousness of the crime, was fixed by laws, which further settled who could exact the blood-money, and who were entitled to share it. Homicide was not the only crime expiable: blood-money could be exacted for most crimes of violence. Some acts, such as killing someone in a church or while asleep, or within the precincts of the royal palace, and corporal infamy (rape) were "bot-less". The death penalty was inflicted instead. Such a criminal was outlawed, and could be killed on sight or thrown into a bog in case of rape, according to Tacitus.

=== In Islam ===
In Islamic terms, Qisas can in some cases result in blood money (diyya) being paid out to the family of victims. The amount varies from country to country and from case to case.

=== In Judaism ===
As a person's life is considered as being the property of God, Judaism forbids the taking of blood-money for the life of a murdered victim.

=== In Japan ===
In Japanese culture it is common to give blood money, or mimaikin, to a victim's family. Such was the case with Lucie Blackman's father, who accepted £450,000 as blood money for the murder of his daughter.

=== In Korea ===
Under the Korean legal system, it is common for those accused of both minor (such as defamation) and serious crimes to offer blood money (habuigeum, 합의금(合意金)) to the victim. If accepted, then the perpetrator is usually excused from further punishment. Despite being common practice, its use in high-profile cases sometimes results in protests.

== Other meanings or uses ==
=== In Christianity ===
In the Christian Bible, the term is used to refer to the thirty pieces of silver Judas Iscariot received, in exchange for revealing the identity of Jesus Christ to the forces sent by the Pharisees and/or the Sanhedrin. After the crucifixion of Christ, Judas returned the payment to the chief priests, who "took the silver pieces and said, 'It is not lawful to put them into the treasury, because it is the price of blood.'"

=== In shipping ===
"Shanghaiing" was the practice of the forced conscription of sailors. Boarding masters, whose job it was to find crews for ships, were paid "by the body," and thus had a strong incentive to place as many seamen on ships as possible. This pay was called blood money.

== See also ==
- Anglo-Saxon law
- Blood feud
- Blood law
- Blood libel
- Danegeld
- Diyya
- Ericfine
- Feud
- Galanas
- Germanic law
- Główszczyzna
- Kanun
- Leges inter Brettos et Scottos
- Leibzoll
- Religious minority
- Protection money
- Tallage
- Weregild
- Wrongful death
