= Galanas =

Former concept in Welsh law

Galanas in Welsh law was a payment made by a killer and his family to the family of his or her victim. It is similar to éraic in Ireland and the Anglo-Saxon weregild.

== Definition ==
The details of galanas were laid out in the Laws of Hywel Dda, codified during the mid tenth century reign of King Hywel Dda, but dating back to earlier oral traditions passed down through bards and jurists. The earliest surviving written documents of the laws are Peniarth MS. 28 and Peniarth MS. 29 (known as the Black Book of Chirk) written c. 1200.

The compensation payment required depended on the status of the victim, but could also be affected by the circumstances of the killing, for example a killing from ambush or by poison meant the payment of double galanas. The payment was due from relatives as distant as the fifth cousins of the killer, with each degree of relationship paying double the rate of the next, for example first cousins of the killer paid double the sum payable by second cousins. Women paid half the rate of payment by men. The first third of the galanas falls on the homicide, his father and mother and brothers and sisters. The remainder is shared between the kindred, with two thirds falling on the father's kindred and one third on the mother's kindred.

The same rules applied to the receipt of galanas. In the existing texts, dating from the 13th century, one third of the sum paid was due to the Lord as the enforcing authority, but this is considered to be an innovation.

Galanas is mentioned 512 times in the known collected manuscripts of Welsh language prose written between 1300 and 1425. It has been suggested that Edward I of England attempted to abolish galanas through the Statute of Rhuddlan following his 1284 conquest of the Welsh principality. This statute laid out the constitutional basis for the government of the Principality of Wales from 1284 until 1536. It introduced English common law to Wales, but also permitted the continuance of Welsh legal practices within the Principality. The galanas tradition is thought to have survived well into the fifteenth century in the Welsh Marches border regions.

== See also ==
- Blood money
- Diyya
- Éraic
- Główszczyzna
- Weregild
