= Musta'min =

Islamic term for non-Muslims temporarily residing in Muslim-ruled lands

Mustaʾmīn or Musta'man (Arabic: مستأمن) is a historical Islamic term for a non-Muslim foreigner temporarily residing in Muslim lands with aman, or guarantee of short-term safe-conduct (aman mu'aqqat), affording the protected status of dhimmi (non-Muslim subjects permanently living in a Muslim-ruled land) without the payment of jizya.

Merchants, messengers, students and other groups could be given an aman, while foreign envoys and emissaries were automatically protected.

== Types of safe-conducts ==
The short-term safe-conduct can be personal or general:

- Personal aman (khass) can be granted by any sane and mature Muslim to one or a group of non-Muslim foreigners (harbis).
- General aman ('amm) can be granted only by the caliph or his deputy to an unspecified number of harbis.

The term is valid up to one year for the musta'min, along with his minor children and all the women related to him. Many Hanbalite jurists allowed the period of aman to one lunar year. Others argued for an indefinite aman.

== Legal rights ==
Once given aman, the musta'mins are free to engage in trade and travel. They are allowed to bring their family and children. They have permission to visit any city in Muslim territory except the holy cities of Mecca and Medina. A musta'min man is allowed to marry a dhimmi woman and take her back to his homeland; however, musta'min women do not have the same right. The musta'min are subject to civil and criminal law in the territory and may not do or say anything that could be construed as harming the interests of Islam. If caught doing so, the musta'min could be expelled or executed and the aman grantor could also be penalized.

== See also ==
- Dhimmi
- Dhimmitude
- Jizya

== Sources ==
- Khadduri, Majid (1955). "Foreigners in Muslim Territory: Ḥarbīs and Mustaʼmīns". War and Peace in the Law of Islam. Baltimore: Johns Hopkins Press. ISBN 1-58477-695-1.
- Yakoob, Nadia; Aimen Mir (2004). "A Contextual Approach to Improving Asylum Law and Practices in the Middle East". In Yvonne Yazbeck Haddad, Barbara Freyer Stowasser (ed.). Islamic Law and the Challenges of Modernity. Walnut Creek, CA: AltaMira Press. ISBN 0-7591-0671-1.
