= Tazir =

Category of offense in Islamic law

In Islamic law, tazir (ta'zeer, ta'zir or ta’dhir, Arabic: تعزير, romanized: taʿzīr lit. scolding, "to punish") refers to punishment for offenses at the discretion of the judge (Qadi) or ruler of the state. It is one of three major categories of punishments or sanctions under Islamic law (sharia, the other two or three being hadd, and qisas/diyya). Contrary to the lightness implied in "scolding", these discretionary punishments can range from a warning from the judge to corporal punishment such as flogging, fines, imprisonment, exile, and in extreme cases execution.

Tazir punishments are sometimes described as being for violations of Islamic law not specified in either the Qur'an nor the hadith, and so not reaching "the level of hudud" (crimes and punishments determined in the Qur'an or hadith), qisas ("eye for an eye" proportional retaliation punishment), or diya (compensation payments for situations where sharia does not allow for qisas retaliation).

== Etymology and meaning ==
Ta'zir literally means "scolding", but also conveys the meanings of 'to give punishment, reject, prohibit, and assist.' Ta'zir is also used as a form of punishment for a crime. In this case, the word is derived from the verb azzara (Arabic: عزر, romanized: azzara), meaning 'to give punishment' or 'to discipline'. or “to give correction.”

=== In scripture ===
Tazir (or another word with the 3-z-r root) is found three times in the Quran, where it is usually translated into English not as "scolding" but as "honor", or a similar word.

- “So that you may honor and support him (Muhammad).” Q.48:9
- “You shall believe in My messengers, and honor and support them.” Q.5:12
- “They believed in him, honored him, and supported him". Q.7:157

== Context in sharia ==
Rather than being divided into categories such as criminal law, civil law, family law, etc. as secular modern law is, classical Islamic legal jurisprudence typically divides the subject matter of law into four "quarters" -- rituals, sales, marriage, and injuries. In modern usage, Islamic criminal law has been extracted and collated from that classical Islamic jurisprudence literature into three categories of rules mentioned above:

- Hadd (literally "limit") are rules and punishments that are stated in the Quran (and sometimes hadiths). Hadd crimes are relatively few: theft, adultery, making unproven accusations of adultery, alcohol consumption, apostasy, and highway robbery or rebellion. As crimes against God they cannot be forgiven/pardoned, but are also rarely implemented because the evidentiary standards are so difficult to meet.
- Qisas, (literally "retaliation in kind") and diya, (دية) ("blood money") punishments are grouped together in Islamic jurisprudence. Included in this category is homicide, for example, which Islamic law treats as a civil dispute between believers. When qisas (Eye for an eye) is applied against the accused in the case of the murder of a Muslim, the victim's nearest relative or wali (ولي) (legal guardian) may take the life of the killer or have the court do it in his behalf.
- Tazir is the third category, and refers to offense mentioned in the Quran or the hadiths, but where neither the Quran nor the hadiths specify a punishment. In tazir cases, the punishment is at the discretion of the state, the ruler, or a qadi (kadi), or court acting on behalf of the ruler. Tazir punishment is for actions which are considered sinful in Islam, undermine the Muslim community, or threaten public order during Islamic rule, but those that are not punishable as hadd or qisas crimes. The legal restrictions on the exercise of that power are not specified in the Quran or hadiths, and vary. The judge enjoys considerable leeway in deciding an appropriate form of punishment, and the punishment does not have to be consistent across the accused persons or over time. The ruler or qadi also has the discretion to forgive tazir offenses.

Tazir is defined by jurist Al-Nawawi as a punishment awarded for crimes which have no hadd nor kaffara, while Hanbali jurist Ibn Qudama defines tazir as a “legal punishment for a crime which has no hadd", and doesn't mention kaffara. Hanafi scholar Imam al-Kasani defines tazir as a crime which has no specified punishment in sharia. It is a crime either against the right of God such as abandoning the prayer and fasting, or against the right of an individual such as harming a Muslim with a word or deed.

== Tazir offenses ==
=== Examples in scripture ===
The word tazir is not used in the Quran or the Hadith, in the sense that modern Islamic criminal law uses it. However, in several verses of the Quran, crimes are identified, punishment of the accused indicated, but no specific punishment is described. Examples being:

And as for the two who are guilty of indecency from among you, give them both a punishment; then if they repent and amend, turn aside from them; surely Allah is Oft-returning (to mercy), the Merciful.

— Quran 4:16

And (as for) those who dispute about Allah after that obedience has been rendered to Him, their plea is null with their Lord, and upon them is wrath, and for them is severe punishment.

— Quran 42:16

These instances led early Islamic scholars to interpret the Quran as requiring discretionary punishment of certain offenses, namely tazir.

=== Other examples ===
Tazir offenses are broadly grouped into two sub-categories in Islamic literature. The first are those offenses that have the same nature but do not exactly meet the complete requirements of hudud crimes. Examples of such tazir offenses include thefts among relatives, or attempted but unsuccessful robbery, fornication that does not include penetration, and homosexual contacts such as kissing that does not result in fornication. The second sub-category of tazir offenses relate to offenses committed by an individual that violate the behavior demanded in the Quran and the Hadiths. Examples of the second sub-category include false testimony, loaning money or any property to another person for interest in addition to principal, any acts that threaten or damage the public order or Muslim community or Islam.

Tazir or discretionary punishment may also be used when offenses for which penalties are prescribed in law are attempted but not completed or where mitigating circumstances or weak evidence make the prescribed penalty unreasonable.

The fourteenth century Islamic jurist Ibn Taymiyyah included any form of disobedience as a tazir offense, although his views were not accepted widely and listed several examples where there is no legal penalty in sharia:

1. the man who kisses a boy or a woman unrelated to him by marriage or a very near kinship;
2. the man who commits adultery;
3. the man who flirts without fornication;
4. the man who eats a forbidden thing like blood, or dead animal which suffers natural death, or meat that is slaughtered in an unlawful manner;
5. the man who steals a thing lying in open or one whose value is unclear;
6. the man who debases the commodities such as foodstuffs and clothes, or who gives short measure of capacity or weight;
7. the man who bears false witness or encourages others to bear false witness;
8. the judge who judges contrary to what Allah has enjoined;
9. the non-Muslim or Muslim engaged in espionage;
10. the man who questions Qadi's opinion or challenges the views of other Muslims;

Numerous other offenses are included in tazir category.

== Tazir punishments ==
=== History ===
Tazir punishments were common in sharia courts. Punishments vary with the nature of crime and include a prison term, flogging, a fine, banishment, and seizure of property. The sixteenth-century Egyptian jurist Ibn Nujaym said that tazir could consist of lashing, slapping, rubbing the ears, a stern telling-off, disparagement short of slander, or an angry look from the judge. Punishment may include a combination of physical and financial punishment, such as lashes and a double fine in the case of punishing someone who steals from a place other than a secure one, which is what the Prophet Muhammad did to someone who had stolen hanging dates before they are placed in the store.

=== Scholars' rules ===
The goal of tazir is deterrence and governance, and punishment should be sentenced with that in mind, varying with the circumstances of the crime. A tazir punishment must not exceed the severity of hudud punishment, so for example, if the penalty for a hudud offence is 80 lashes (as it is for qadhf, the false accusation of adultery, when committed by a non-slave male) then in a similar tazir case, a perpetrator found guilty would receive no more than 79 lashes.

Execution is allowed in cases where a practice might split the Muslim community, such as espionage on behalf of an enemy of the Muslim state. All four schools of fiqh (madhhab), namely Hanafi, Maliki, Shafii and Hanbali, permit the death penalty at the discretion of the state or qadi, for certain tazir offenses if it is proven by at two least witnesses or a self confession.

=== Contemporary application ===
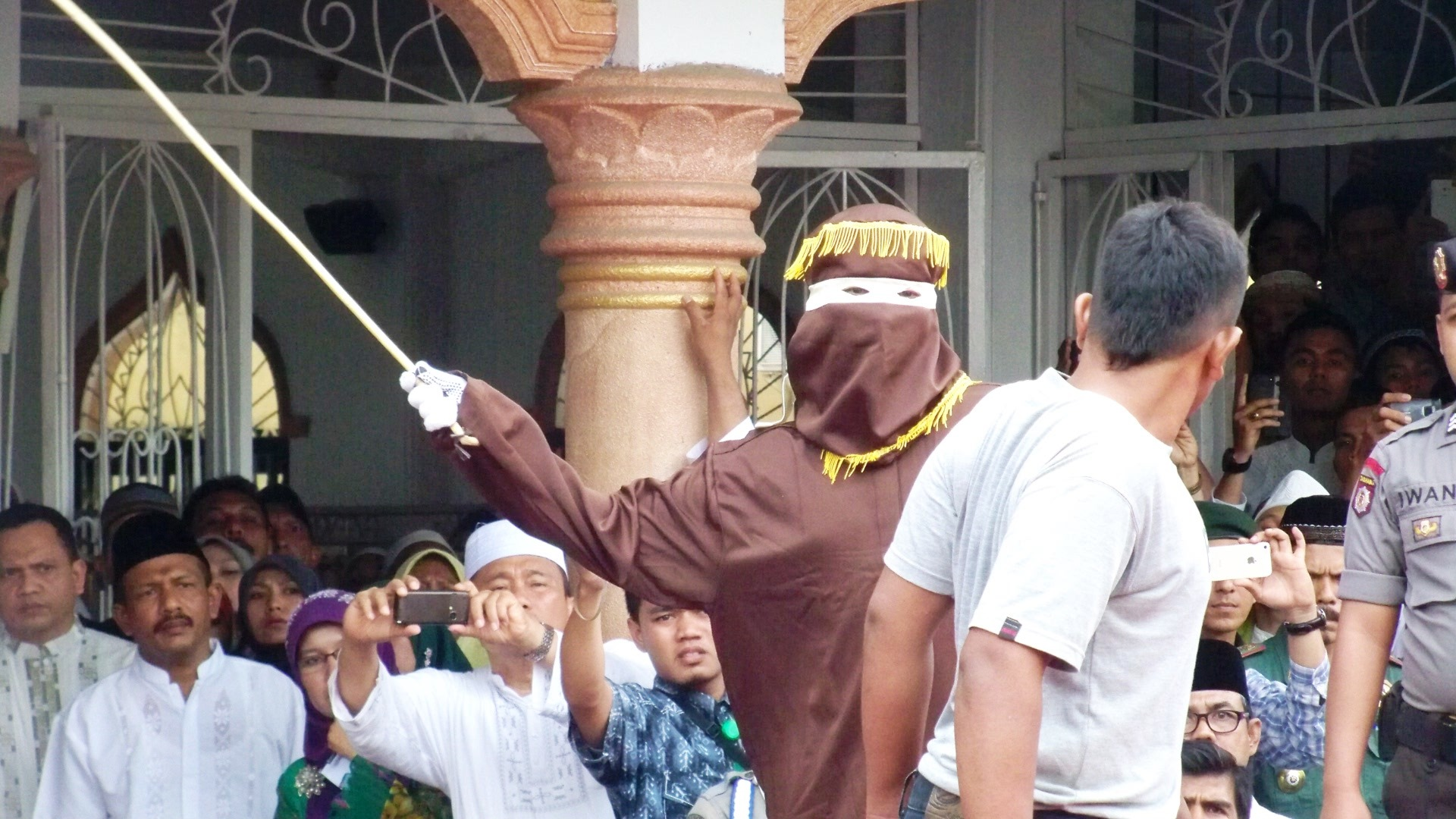
A convict receiving a caning sentence in Banda Aceh in Indonesia under sharia, 19 September 2014.

Brunei introduced tazir into its Syariah Penal Code Order effective 2014. Tazir crimes in Brunei now include offenses such as failing to perform Friday prayers by anyone above 15 years old, any Muslim disrespecting the month of Ramadan, and khalwat (dating or any form of close proximity between unrelated members of opposite sex).

In the province of Aceh in Indonesia, an institutional framework for sharia law enforcement (including tazir) has slowly been put in place since 1999. Tazir crimes in Aceh include "gambling, cheating, falsification of documents, illicit relations, failing to fast during Ramadan and failing to observe daily (salat) prayers ... offences which disrupt public order or undermine the public interest, such as traffic violations."

==== Islamic Republic of Iran ====
Iran introduced tazir into its legal code after the 1979 Revolution, naming the section as Qanon-e Tazir. ta’zir crimes incur "discretionary punishments applied by the State that are not derived" from sharia.

These tazir laws allow prosecution of offenses such as illicit kissing, failing to wear proper head dress such as hejab, and making critical statements against judges and members of the Guardian Council. The death penalty can be imposed under ta’zir crimes for “'cursing the Prophet' (article 513 of the Penal Code), ... drug smuggling or trafficking, murder, espionage and crimes against national security", according to the Center for Human Rights in Iran.

According to the Abdorrahman Boroumand Center, over a 30+ year period, courts in the Islamic Republic of Iran have sentenced "thousands" of individuals to flogging, "sometimes up to more than 300 or 400 lashes", although these include sentences for hudud crimes. There are "at least" 148 offenses punishable by flogging in the Islamic Republic. In addition to sharia hudood punishments for alcohol use, fornication, etc., flogging is also used in the interrogation of detainees (under tazir).

== See also ==
- Hudud
- Qisas
- Sharia

== Sources ==
- Akramov, Mukhtor (2024). "Ta'dhir in Islamic Law : Types of Crimes and Punishments". Jurnal ISO. 4 (2): –1–7.
