= Frood Fouladvand =

Iranian monarchist (born 1941, disappeared 2007)

- Born: 26 November 1941; Shah Valeh, Azna, Lorestan, Iran
- Disappeared: 17 January 2007 (age 66); Yüksekova, Hakkâri, Turkey
- Status: Missing for 19 years, 2 months and 26 days, presumed to have been abducted by Iranian security forces

Frood Fouladvand (Persian: فرود فولادوند; 26 November 1941 – 17 January 2007) was an Iranian actor, film director, playwright, screenwriter, monarchist, and founder of the group Kingdom Assembly of Iran (API). He was known for his political activism and vocal opposition to the Iranian government, as well as his prolific film career in Iran and Egypt. He and two other API members disappeared in January 2007 near Yüksekova in Turkey near the Iran–Turkey border whilst on what was described by his supporters as a mission to "liberate" Iran. It is presumed that he was abducted by Iranian security forces.

== Life before politics ==
Frood Fouladvand was born as Fathollah Manouchehri in the Lorestan Province of Iran. He belonged to the Fouladvand tribe, who are Bakhtiari Lurs. During the Imperial Era, he worked as a playwright, director, actor, screenwriter and voice dubber. Fouladvand enjoyed much domestic success in his roles, and was one of the important figures in the film dubbing industry. Fouladvand did all of his artistic work under his birth name, Fathollah Manouchehri.

On the advent of the Iranian Revolution, Fouladvand would leave Iran, going to Turkey, Egypt, Germany, and finally the United Kingdom, where he remained a resident until his disappearance. He would adopt the name Frood, as he felt it was more Iranian-sounding than Fathollah, which means "The Victory of Allah" in Arabic.

== Political activities ==
Fouladvand was an advocate for the overthrow of the Iranian Government and a restoration of Monarchy in Iran. Ideologically, he was a proponent of secularism and was known for being a very harsh critic of Islam, viewing it as an anti-Iranian religion. He resided in the United Kingdom whilst he was politically active. He ran a satellite television show known as "Your TV" from London, which he used to support his cause for the overthrow of the Iranian government and restoration of the monarchy. On 17 June 2005 he and three other API members were arrested in several raids by armed police, and involving MI5, on suspicion of terrorism. According to a Section 298 (2) "Application for Forfeiture of Detained Cash" document, it was suspected that they were intending to illegally overthrow the Iranian government, by force if necessary. His supporters condemned the arrests and associated raid, claiming that police had tried to "silence" Fouladvand, and had "brutally assaulted" him and three of his supporters.

== Kingdom Assembly of Iran ==
Derafsh-e Kaviani. The Derafsh-e Kaviani was the official flag of the Aryan Empire, as well as Fouladvand's party, and he often featured it in his programmes.

Kingdom Assembly of Iran (Persian: انجمن پادشاهی ایران, romanized: Anjoman-e Pâdeshâhi-ye Irân) or API, also "The Monarchy Assembly Iran", "Soldiers of the Kingdom Assembly of Iran" or "Iran Monarchy Committee" (Persian: تندر), is an Iranian exile monarchist opposition group which was founded Frood Fouladvand. It seeks to overthrow the Islamic Republic and restore the Iranian monarchy under a new dynasty. The group is currently banned in the Islamic Republic of Iran. It has a military wing called Tondar, a name which means 'thunder' in Persian. Iranian authorities have described it as a terrorist organisation. It is not on the US terrorist organization list.

One of API's more notable protests involved staging a sit-in on a Lufthansa flight from Frankfurt to protest the Iranian regime. On 13 March 2005, fifty-nine passengers on the flight refused to disembark upon arrival in Brussels, and a 13-hour sit-in ensued. Three passengers left voluntarily, and Belgian police eventually boarded and escorted the other fifty-six passengers off.

The ultimate aim of API however was to overthrow the Iranian Theocracy and restore a monarchy under a new dynasty. Fouladvand had stated that he intended to serve as Regent until someone he deemed embodied the Farr-e Kiani was found to sit on the throne. He had even go so far as to prepare a constitution for a new Imperial Iran.

== Disappearance ==
Frood Fouladvand disappeared on 17 January 2007 along with two other API members, Alexander Valizadeh and Nazem Schmidtt. According to API they were attempting to return to Iran in order to overthrow the Iranian regime. It is presumed that they were abducted by Iranian security forces in Yüksekova, Turkey and taken into custody of the Ministry of Intelligence. Their hired car was found with its windows smashed, wiring cut, and number plates removed. Amnesty International expressed concern that Fouladvand and his companions were "at risk of torture or other ill-treatment, and may even be sentenced to death". In 2007, a Kingdom Assembly of Iran spokesman stated that Fouladvand and two companions were "missing and believed murdered by Iranian intelligence". In a newsletter on 4 June 2008, the anti-capital punishment group, Hands Off Cain, raised concerns that Fouladvand either had been, or would soon be, executed by the Iranian government. The UK ambassador to Iran had spoken to the authorities in Tehran, but had not received any information as of 18 June 2008. Whilst some API members believed that he had been abducted and subsequently executed, others including his successor as leader, Djamshid Sharmahd, as late as 2010, still claimed that Fouladvand was actually in hiding, and undercover. Sharmahd was himself abducted on the orders of the Iranian government in 2020.

API continued to operate, and would claim responsibility for the bombing of a Mosque in Shiraz in 2008.

== See also ==
- Capital punishment in Iran
- Iranian nationalism
- List of people who disappeared mysteriously (2000–present)
