= Execution of Majid Kazemi =

2023 execution in Iran

Majid Kazemi
- Cause of death: Execution by hanging
- Known for: Third execution related to the Mahsa Amini protests

Majid Kazemi Sheikh-Shabani was one of three individuals convicted in connection with the Khaneh Esfahan case, accused of opening fire and causing the deaths of two Basij members and a Special Unit colonel in Isfahan. He was charged with moharebeh (waging war against God) and was executed on May 19, 2023, despite calls from human rights organizations and prominent figures for a suspension of the sentence.

Kazemi was arrested on November 21, 2022, five days after the Khaneh Esfahan incident, at the home of his brother, Hossein. According to reports, he was beaten by security forces during the arrest. In an audio recording from prison, dated January 13, 2023, Kazemi stated that he had been subjected to torture and forced to confess under duress.

Two other defendants in the case, Saeed Yaghoubi and Saleh Mirhashmi Baltaghi, were also executed. Reports indicate that Kazemi and the other defendants were denied access to legal representation of their choice.

== Before execution ==
The death sentences of Majid Kazemi Sheikh-Shabani and the other defendants were upheld by the Supreme Court of the Islamic Republic of Iran.

Prior to their execution, Saleh Mirhashmi and Saeed Yaghoubi were transferred to solitary confinement in Dastgerd Prison. Majid Kazemi Sheikh-Shabani was also placed in solitary confinement on the same day.

The Iranian state media broadcast video confessions of the three defendants before their execution. Human rights organizations have described such broadcasts as coerced and part of a broader pattern of forced confessions aired prior to executions in Iran.

== Protests against the death sentence ==
Following the Supreme Court's ruling, the broadcasting of televised confessions, and the transfer of the convicted individuals to solitary confinement, family members and segments of the public gathered in front of Dastgerd Prison to protest and call for a halt to the executions.

On the evening of May 14, 2023, Mohammad Hashemi, a cousin of Majid Kazemi, tweeted about the possible execution of Kazemi and two other defendants in the Khaneh Esfahan case. According to Hashemi, information he received indicated that the executions were scheduled for dawn on May 15. In response, a group of Isfahan residents assembled outside the prison in an attempt to prevent them.

Protests outside Isfahan Central Prison began late Sunday night, with videos shared on social media showing groups of residents gathering in their cars, honking, and blocking roads. In some footage, demonstrators could be heard chanting slogans opposing the executions.

A group of legal experts and attorneys addressed a letter to Iran’s judiciary and the Supreme Court judges, citing legal irregularities in the handling of the case and calling for an immediate suspension of the executions. Additionally, actress Taraneh Alidoosti urged the United Nations and its Human Rights Council via Instagram to intervene.

== After the executions ==
=== Arrests and pressure on families ===
Following the execution of the defendants in the Khaneh Esfahan case on the morning of Friday, May 19, pressure on their families intensified. Two brothers of Majid Kazemi were beaten and arrested, and his sister was also detained while seeking information about them. On Saturday, the mother of Saleh Mirhashemi stated in an audio recording that government forces had handcuffed her husband and prevented the family from holding a memorial service.

Majid Kazemi’s sister was released on May 22, 2023, but his two brothers remain imprisoned.

=== Grave desecration ===
When Majid Kazemi’s family visited his grave, they found it burned. The night before the incident, authorities had warned the family against visiting the grave for a memorial marking his birthday.

== See also ==
- Capital punishment in Iran
- Human rights violations by the Islamic Republic of Iran
- Execution of Mohammad Mehdi Karami
