= Tondar =

Tondar could refer to:

- Tondar, the Iranian copy of the Heckler & Koch MP5
- Kingdom Assembly of Iran
