= 2022 Shah Cheragh attack =

2022 mass shooting in Iran

Shah Cheragh attack
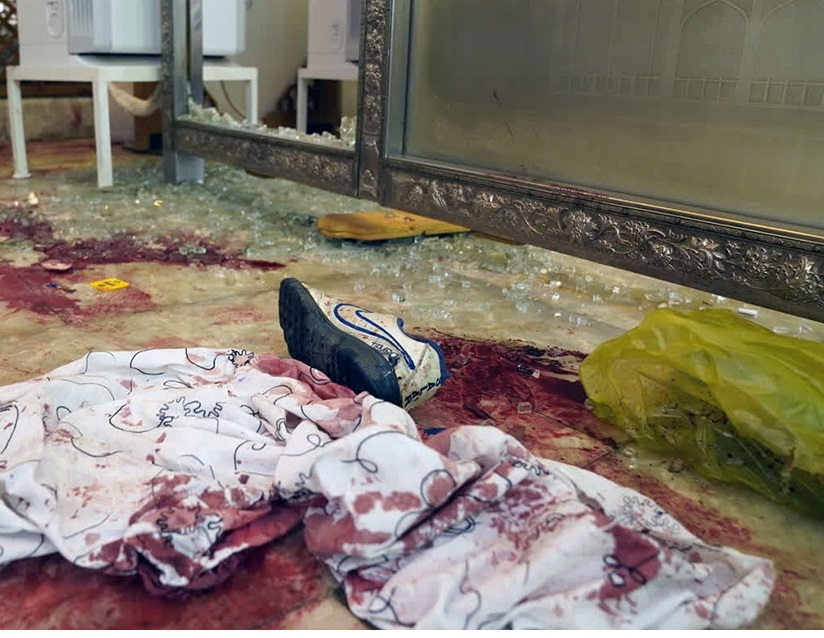
- Bloodstains over the floor of Shah Cheragh, Iran, along with Chador and shoe of a victim.
- Location: 29°36′35″N 52°32′35″E; Shiraz, Fars province, Iran
- Date: 26 October 2022
- Target: Shi'ites
- Attack type: Mass shooting
- Weapon: AKMS style rifle
- Deaths: 16 (including the assailant)
- Injuries: 40+
- Perpetrator: Islamic State – Iran Province
- No. of participants: 1 armed gunman, killed by Iranian security forces, others 2 captured alive
- Motive: Islamic Statism; Anti-Shia'ism; IS anti-Shia sentiment

The Shah Cheragh attack (Persian: حمله به حرم شاه‌چراغ) was a mass shooting that occurred on 26 October 2022 at Shah Cheragh mosque, a Shia pilgrimage site in Shiraz in southern Iran, in which at least 13 people were killed. The Islamic State claimed responsibility for the attack. Iranian authorities condemned the attacks.

== Attack ==
On 26 October 2022, 15 people were killed in a mass shooting at Shah Cheragh mausoleum in Shiraz, Fars province, Iran. Sources report either thirteen or fifteen people as being killed as a result of the mass shooting, including children.

== Perpetrator ==
The Islamic State's “Fars” (Iran) Province claimed responsibility for the attack via Amaq, the group's propaganda media. The three attackers are described by Iranian state media as appearing to be takfiri terrorists. Two attackers were arrested after the attack; the other remained at large. Later the same day, Islamic State reportedly claimed responsibility for the attack. The Iranian authorities stated that the attackers were not Iranian nationals. Another suspected participant, an ISIS–K leader who allegedly facilitated the attack, was arrested on May 15. Conflicting reports from the local judiciary chief suggest that only one attacker was involved.

A report by The Washington Institute for Near East Policy said ISIS had uploaded a video of the perpetrator, identified by the alias "Abu Aisha Al-Umari", declaring allegiance to the Islamic State. According to Voice of America Persian News Network, some Iranian protestors speculated that this terrorist attack was a conspiracy of the Iranian government to divert public opinion from Iran's nationwide protests. Mohammad Gharawi, director of the New Generation Media Center said that ISIS "is now taking revenge for the fact that Iran contributed to its elimination in Iraq and Syria".

Associate professor Fouad Izadi, member of the Faculty of World Studies of the University of Tehran, said the attack was "an ISIS trademark" as the group was known for attacking mosques and shrines in the past. On the other hand, the Institute for the Study of War assessed that the attack does not match the typical ISIS pattern and views it as an attempt to stoke sectarian tensions in Iran. The Institute expected the Iranian government to exploit it to weaken and/or suppress the ongoing Mahsa Amini protests regardless of the perpetrator.

On 8 July 2023, two men were executed for their involvement in the attack.

== Reactions ==
=== Domestic ===
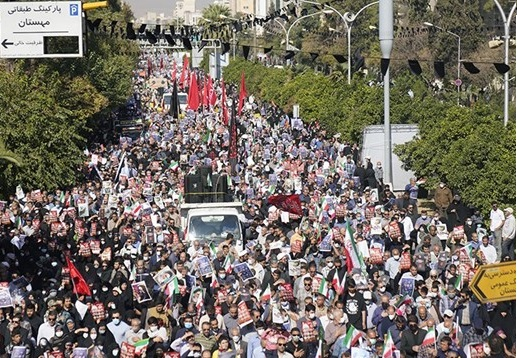
Funeral of Shah Cheragh shooting victims

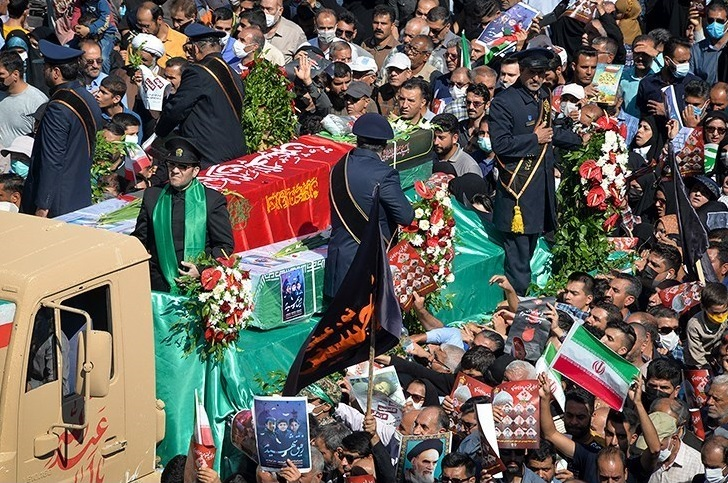
Coffins of the victims of the Shah Cheragh mass shooting incident

Iranian Supreme Leader, Ali Khamenei called on Iranians to unite and vowed to punish the perpetrators of the attack. Interior Minister Ahmad Vahidi blamed the Mahsa Amini protests for paving the ground for the attack on the mausoleum. Officials in the Fars province, where the attack took place, declared three days of mourning. Iran's president, Ebrahim Raisi said "Experience shows that Iran's enemies, after failing to create a split in the nation's united ranks, take revenge through violence and terror." The Iranian government accused the protestors of Mahsa Amini's death of paving the way for such attacks to occur.

Iranian authorities organized rallies in Shiraz and elsewhere in the country to denounce the shooting. According to state-affiliated media "large numbers of students and professors" reportedly took part in demonstrations denouncing the Shiraz terrorist attack.

=== International ===
The United Nations Secretary-General António Guterres strongly condemned the terrorist assault on the Shah Cheragh Holy Shrine in Shiraz, Iran, which is claimed by the Islamic State. The message said that targeting religious places is heinous and the Secretary-General emphasized: "bring[ing] to justice the perpetrators of this crime against civilians exercising their right to practice their religion". Also, the Secretary-General expressed his condolences to the bereaved families, the Iranian people, and the Iranian government wished a swift recovery for the injured.

Oman offered condolences to the government and people of Iran. Pakistan condemned the attack and expressed solidarity with the Iranian people. Lebanon called for the punishment of those responsible even if those responsible are their own citizens. Turkey denounced the "heinous and cruel terrorist attack." Finland said that it was "Deeply saddened by the terrorist attack at the Shah Cheragh shrine in Shiraz" and it "strongly condemns terrorism in all its forms and manifestations". India strongly condemned the attack and extended condolences to Iran and urged the world "unite and combat terrorism in all its forms and manifestations". Japan strongly condemned the terrorist attack and expressed condolences to the victims and their families.

== See also ==
- Assassination and terrorism in Iran
- Iran and the Islamic State
- List of terrorist incidents linked to the Islamic State
- Shiraz bombing
