= Masoud Ahmadi Moghaddasi =

Murdered Iranian Judge

Personal details
- Born: 1963 Mashhad, Iran
- Died: 2 August 2005 (aged 42) Tehran, Iran
- Cause of death: Gunshot wounds
- Occupation: Judge

Masoud Ahmadi Moghaddasi (Persian: مسعود احمدی مقدسی; 1963 – 2 August 2005) was an Iranian judge and deputy to Saeed Mortazavi. He was assassinated on Tehran's Ahmad Ghasir Avenue while commuting home from work. The shooter was Majid Kavousifar, who was hanged two years later.

Moghaddasi was born in 1963 at the Balakhiaban neighbourhood of Mashhad to a poor family. His family was from Yazd.
