= Nazhvan Forest Park =

Park in Iran

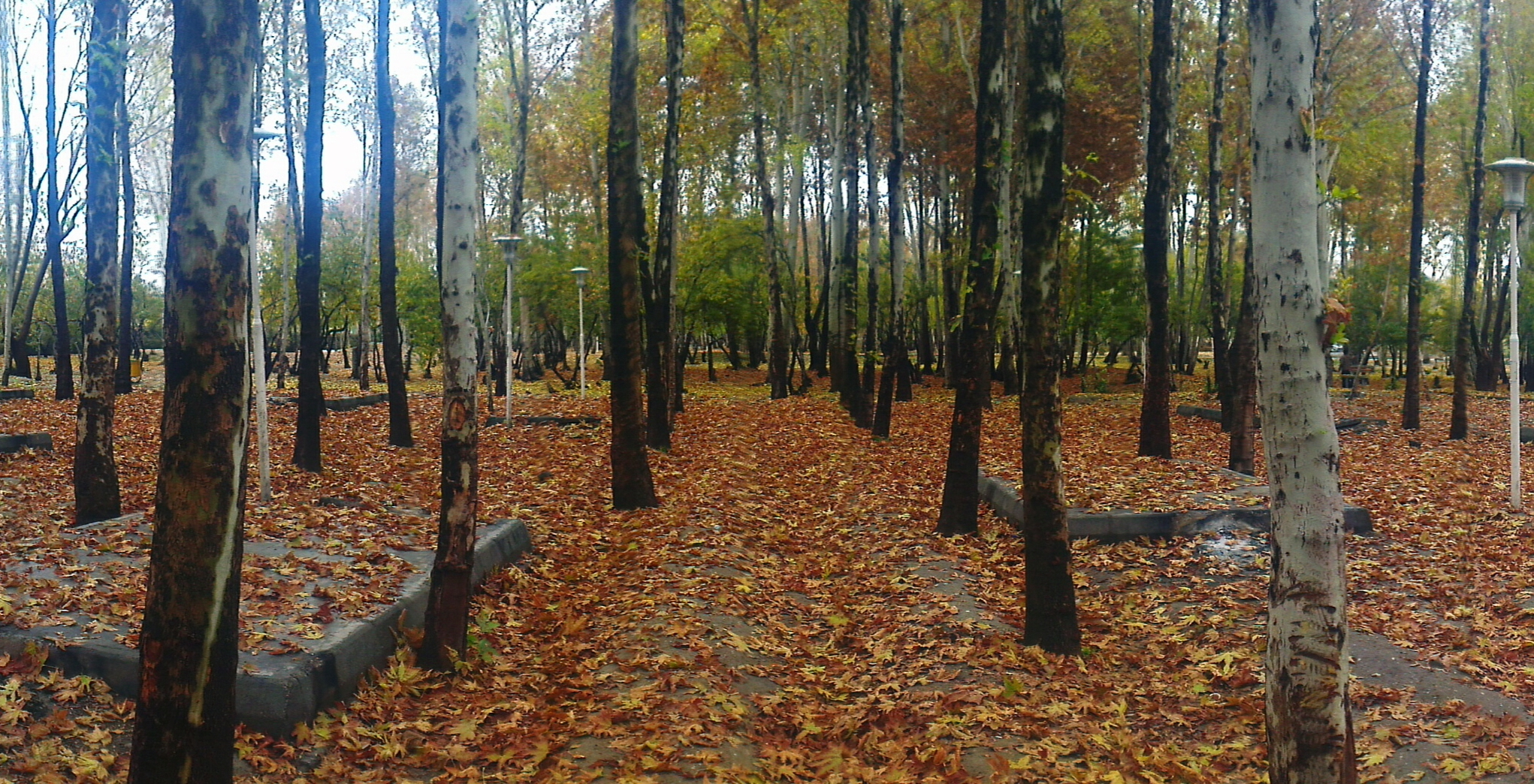
- Interactive map of Nazhvan Forest Park
- Type: Urban park
- Location: Isfahan, Iran
- Coordinates: 32°38′32″N 51°37′35″E
- Area: 1200 ha
- Owner: Municipality of Isfahan
- Status: Open all year

The Nazhvan Forest Park is one of the few gardens in Isfahan, which has been rather safe from expansion and development of the city and freshens the air of Isfahan. The word nazhvan consists of two words nazh, which means "poplar" in Persian and van, which is a Persian suffix for place. Therefore nazhvan means "a place for poplars". Nazhvan has an area of 1200 ha and is located in the western part of the city. It's the only remaining part of the green space in the suburban area of Isfahan. A personification of Isfahan's lungs; it has a special importance from the bio-environmental point of view for the city. The Zayanderud river flows through the middle of the Nazhvan garden which makes it different from other parks in Isfahan. As part of the Project On Prosperity of Nazhvan, the local government of Isfahan created facilities in Nazhvan as nearby recreational area like sport grounds, a swimming pool, a campsite, playgrounds for children, also facilities for horse droshky, horse sport, boating and cycling.

== Gallery ==
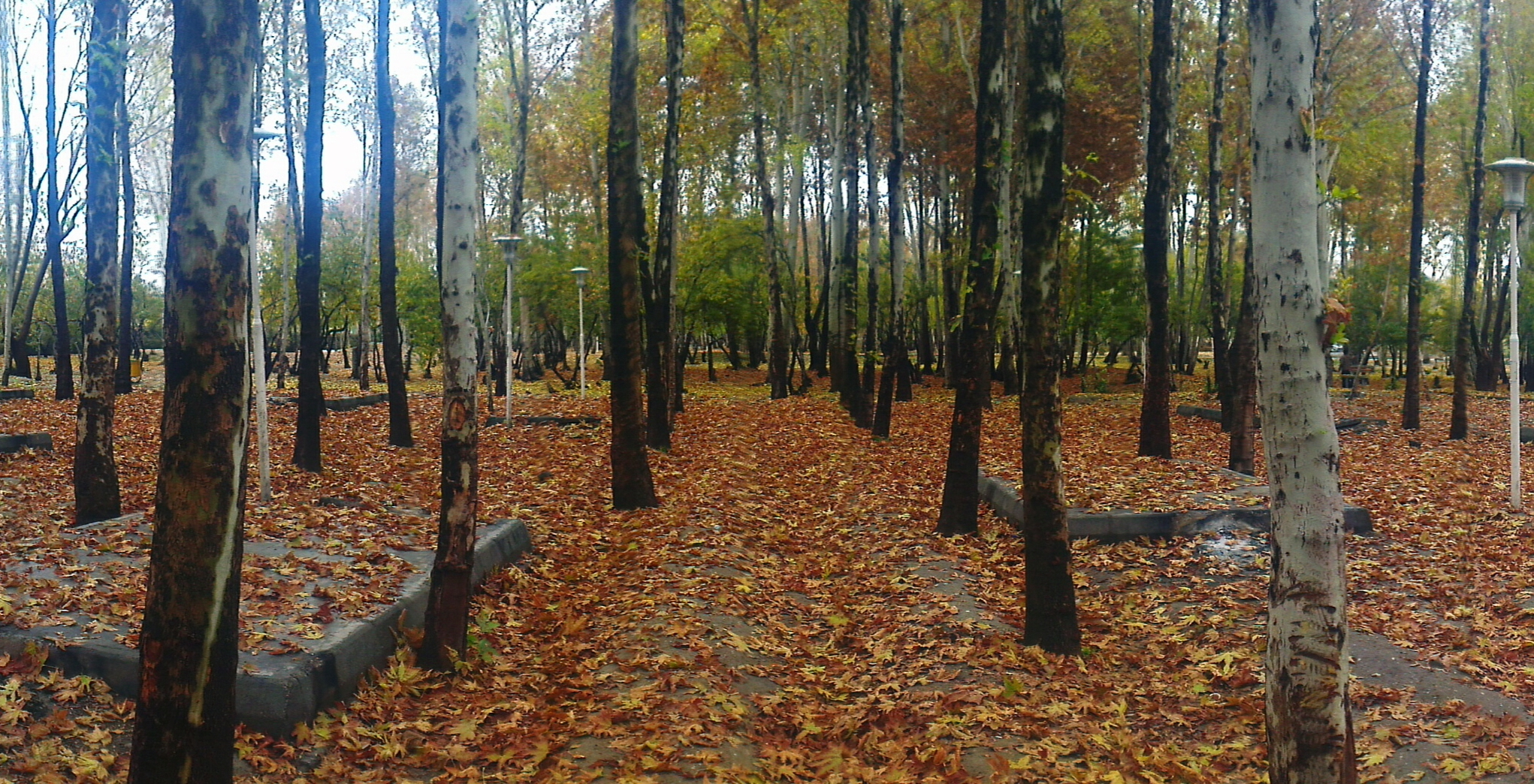

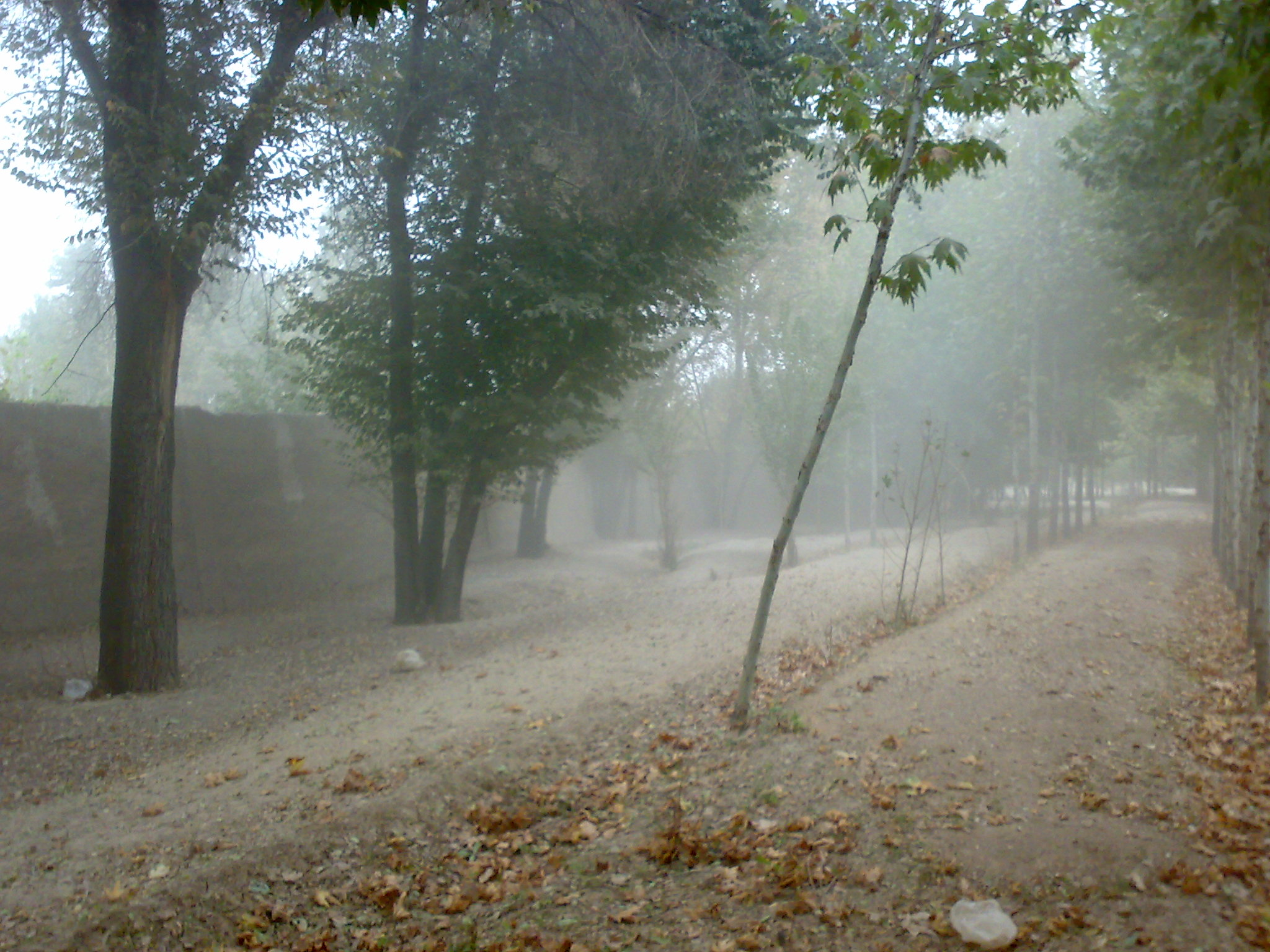

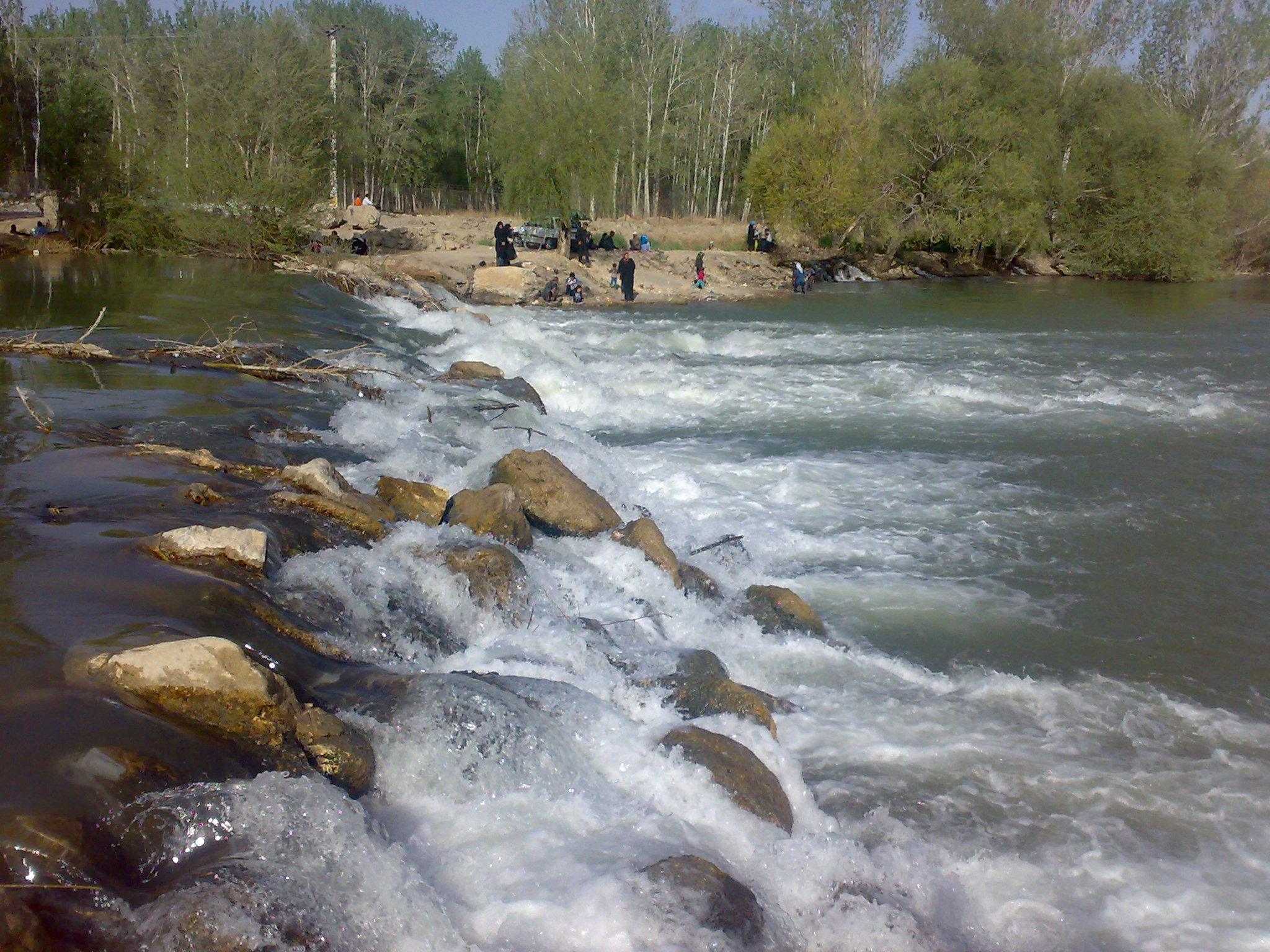

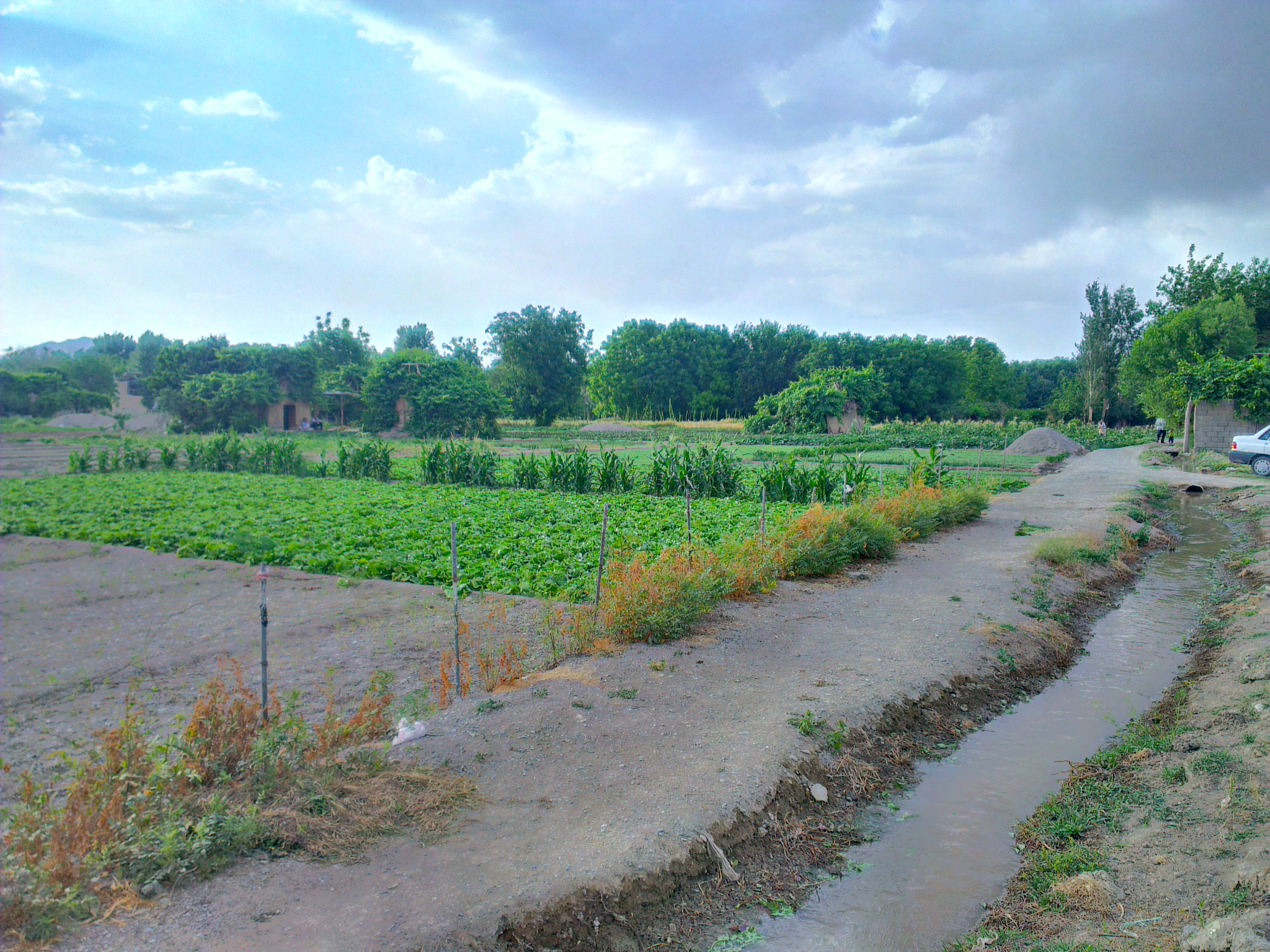

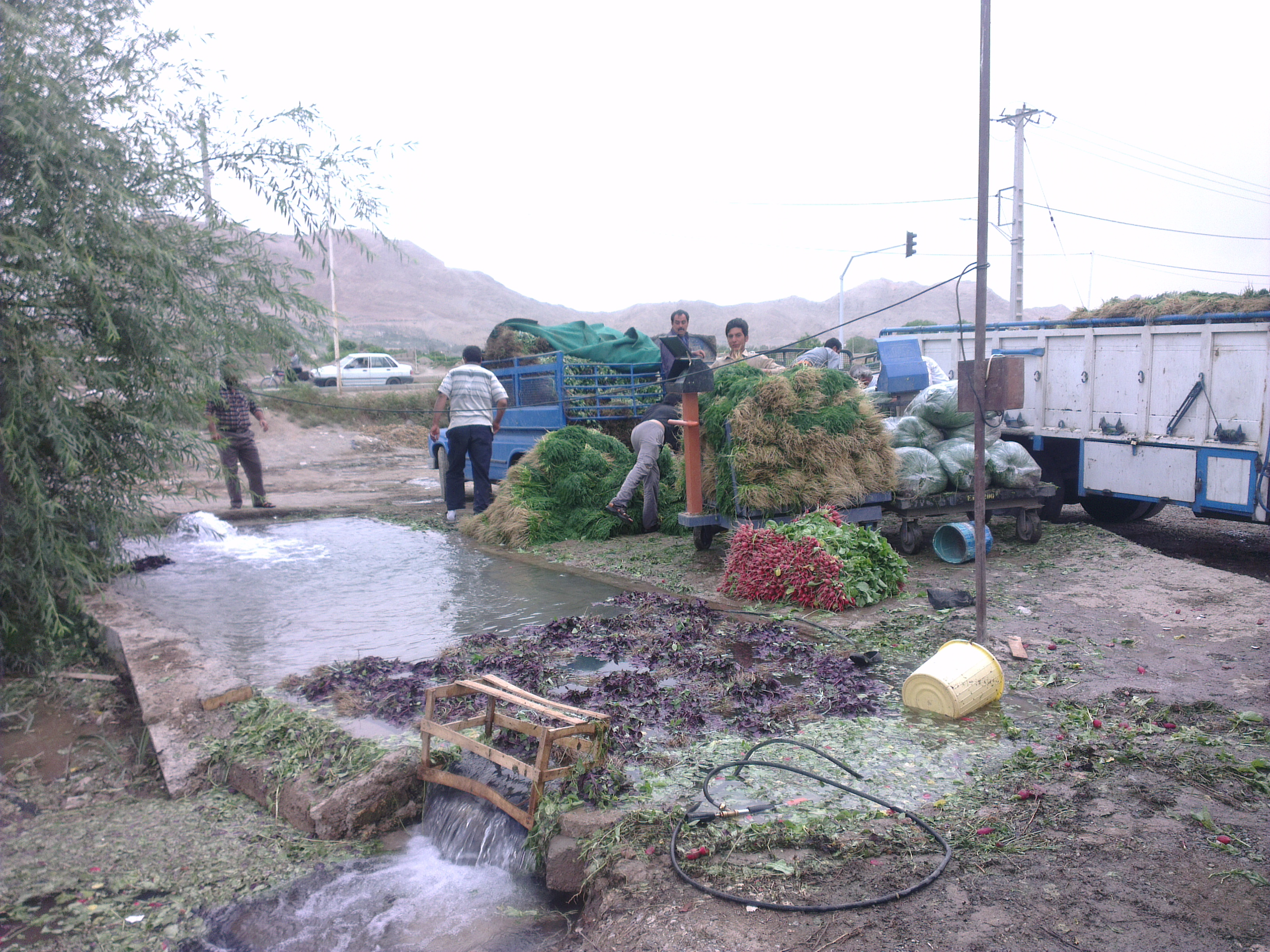

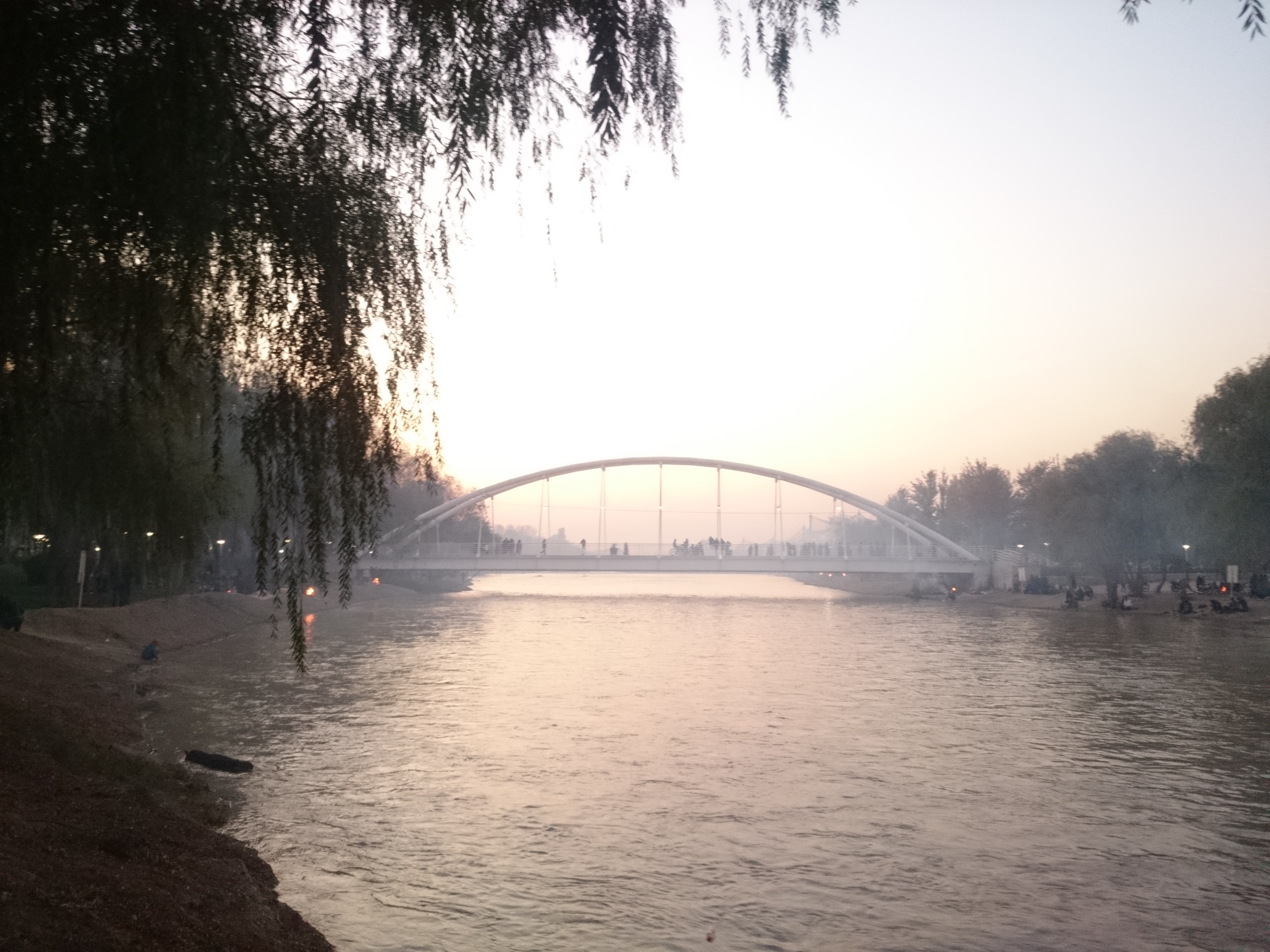

== See also ==
- District 13, Isfahan
