= Jamshid Sharmahd =

German affiliate of Kingdom Assembly of Iran (1955–2024)

- جمشید شارمهد
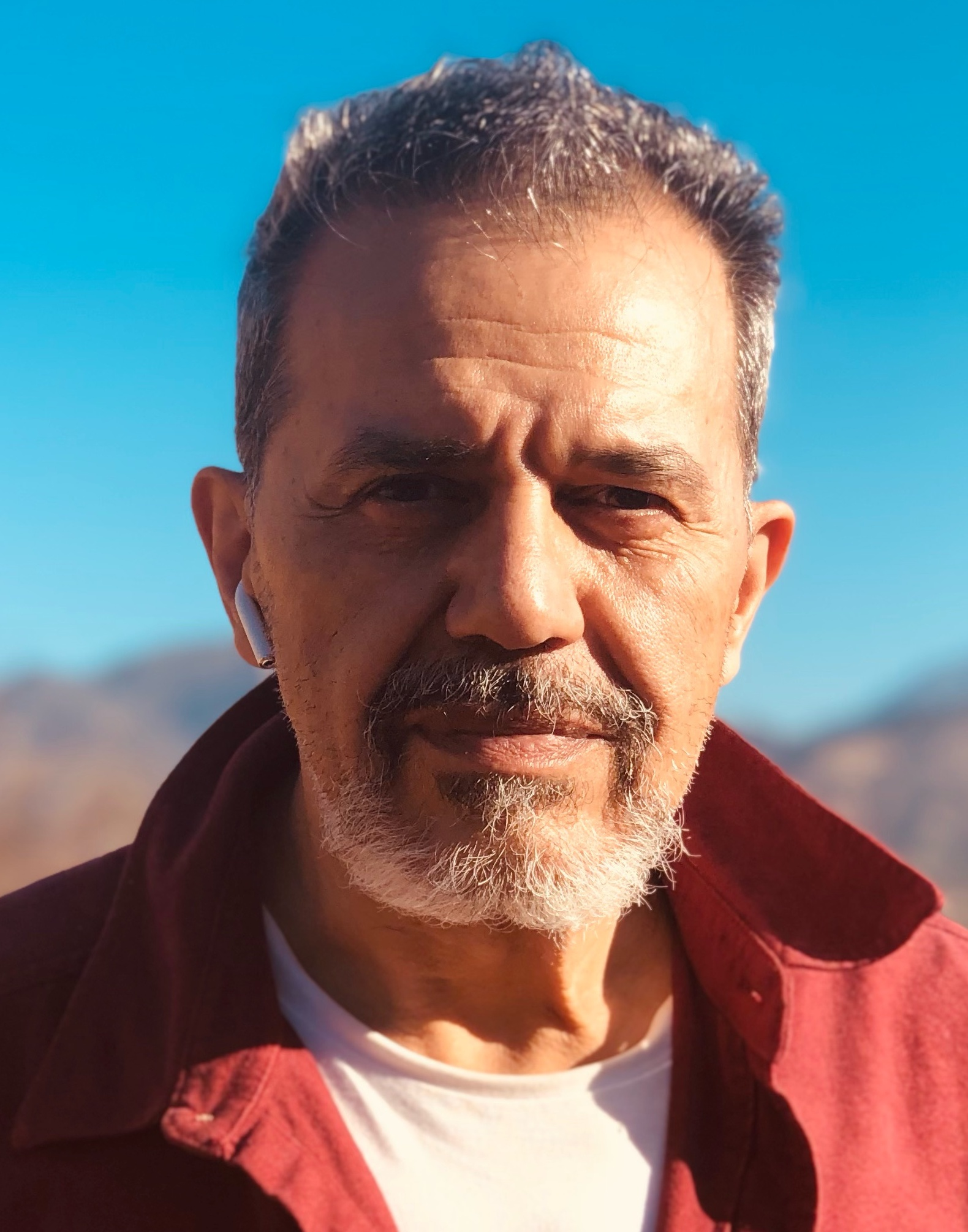
- Sharmahd in 2019
- Born: 23 March 1955; Tehran, Iran
- Died: 28 October 2024 (aged 69); Tehran, Iran
- Cause of death: Execution
- Citizenship: Germany
- Education: Software engineering, information technology
- Occupations: Journalist; software engineer
- Children: Gazelle Sharmahd, Shayan Sharmahd

Jamshid Sharmahd (Persian: جمشید شارمهد; 23 March 1955 – 28 October 2024) was a German national and software engineer, based in Los Angeles, California. A permanent resident of the United States from 2003, Sharmahd had been targeted by the Iranian government for his connections to Tondar, an Iranian monarchist group engaging in violent attacks against the Islamic regime. He was abducted by Iranian agents in a forced disappearance in 2020. In a 2023 trial condemned by Amnesty International, Germany, the United States, and the European Council, Sharmahd was sentenced to death. He was held in solitary confinement until his execution on 28 October 2024.

== Biography ==
Jamshid Sharmahd was born in Tehran, Iran, on 23 March 1955. When he was seven years old, he moved with his father to Hanover, West Germany, where he grew up in a German-Iranian household. He was Zoroastrian. He studied to become an electrician, and in 1980 briefly returned to Iran where he got married. In 1983, he returned to West Germany with his wife and daughter. He became a naturalized German citizen in 1995.

Sharmahd established his own software company and in 2003 moved to the United States, where he became a permanent resident (green card holder). After moving to the U.S., Sharmahd resided in the Los Angeles area, living in Glendora, California. Sharmahd had Parkinson's disease.

According to Sharmahd's daughter, Sharmahd provided technical support and website design services for Tondar ("Thunder"), a news platform and monarchist opposition movement. Among the array of Iranian opposition groups, Tondar is considered obscure. The Iranian government accuses Tondar of being a terrorist organization, which the group's members deny. Sharmahd's daughter said that he had become more involved in the group's web publishing and broadcasting in 2007, after group leader Frood Fouladvand was kidnapped in Turkey. Sharmahd helped operate Tondar's Los Angeles-based television and radio programming, including a satellite radio station accessible in Iran. Although his work was intended to be uncredited, a technical error led to the exposure of Sharmahd's name on the public platform. After he was kidnapped in 2020, the Iranian government asserted that Sharmahd ran Tondar, part of the Kingdom Assembly of Iran.

Members of the group in California feared reprisal from Iranian agents, and Tondar's former office in Los Angeles was twice burglarized. Sharmahd was targeted by the Iranian government. Mohammad Reza Sadeghnia was arrested in July 2009 near the Los Angeles airport and pleaded guilty in Los Angeles Superior Court to attempting to hire a hit man to kill Sharmahd, but in 2010 skipped his court date and fled to Iran. Sadeghnia's lawyer denied that his client was an Iranian agent, and said that the prosecution stemmed from his client's drunken comments that he could not have carried out.

== Kidnapping in Dubai ==
In late July 2020, secret agents from Iran's Ministry of Intelligence abducted Sharmahd and took him to Iran. Sharmahd had been in Dubai, where he had been awaiting a connecting flight to India, when he was kidnapped. His last message to his family was received on 28 July 2020. Cell phone tracking data showed movements south from Dubai to Al Ain the next day, and then to Sohar, Oman, on 30 July, when tracking ended. The Iranian Intelligence Ministry said it had seized Sharmahd in a "complex operation" but provided no details.

The Iranian government alleged that Sharmahd was responsible for a 2008 attack on a mosque in Shiraz that killed 14 people and injured 200; it also claimed that in 2017 he had revealed "classified information" on Revolutionary Guard missile sites. The Working Group on Arbitrary Detention stated that "Mr. Sharmahd is being deprived of his liberty as a result of exercising the right to freedom of opinion and expression." Sharmahd denied all charges, and his family campaigned for his release. Sharmahd's abduction was one of a series of kidnapping plots orchestrated by the Iranian government against dissidents, as part of its campaign of transnational repression. Sharmahd's abduction was compared to the previous case of Ruhollah Zam, an exiled journalist who was lured back to Iran and executed in 2020.

== Forced disappearance and execution in Iran ==
In February 2023, Sharmahd was sentenced to death by a Revolutionary Court in Tehran on charges of "corruption on earth by planning and directing terrorist attacks." The Iranian Supreme Court upheld the death sentence on 26 April 2023. Amnesty International condemned the trial as grossly unfair, reporting that Iranian authorities had tortured Sharmahd while he was in detention, held him in solitary confinement for extended periods, and denied him access to his Parkinson's disease medications and other treatments. The trial was overseen by Abolghasem Salavati, a judge loyal to the Iranian regime who presided over other prosecutions of dissidents.

The German and U.S. governments also condemned the trial as a sham, with German Minister for Foreign Affairs Annalena Baerbock saying Sharmahd "never had even the semblance of a fair trial." Sharmahd was repeatedly denied German consular assistance and access to trials. In response to the sentence, Germany expelled two Iranian diplomats.

In 2022, the Working Group on Arbitrary Detention (WGAD) released a 13-page document confirming Sharmahd's arrest, forced disappearance, human rights violations, and torture. The WGAD concluded that Sharmahd's detention was arbitrary and called for his "immediate unconditional release." In January 2023, Friedrich Merz, the chairman of the CDU/CSU parliamentary group, took over the political sponsorship for Sharmahd. Merz attempted to travel to Iran to verify the health of Sharmahd, but Iranian authorities denied him a visa. Merz repeatedly demanded Sharmahd's release and called for the German government "to significantly step up its efforts to release Jamshid Sharmahd." In April 2023, the European Council publicly condemned the death sentence of Sharmahd.

Sharmahd was executed in Tehran on 28 October 2024, at the age of 69. Iranian state media announced his execution. German Chancellor Olaf Scholz condemned the execution and called it "a scandal." Baerbock, the German foreign minister, condemned "the murder of Jamshid Sharmahd by the Iranian regime in the strongest possible terms." Sharmahd's daughter criticized the U.S. and German governments, contending that they had failed to do enough to secure Sharmahd's release. She called for the return of Sharmahd's body for burial in accordance with Zoroastrian burial rites. Masih Alinejad, an Iranian American activist who was reportedly the target of an Iranian assassination attempt foiled by U.S. authorities, said in response to the execution, "The Islamic Republic understands no language of peace or diplomacy. Their language is that of hostage-taking, execution, assassination and murder." Iran Human Rights, an Oslo-based NGO, tallied Sharmahd's killing as one of at least 166 executions carried out in Iran in October 2024.

On 5 November 2024, a spokesman for the Iranian judiciary asserted that Sharmahd died before he could be executed, contradicting the Iranian government's earlier statements. The official gave no details. The German Foreign Ministry, in response, stated: "His death was confirmed to us by the Iranian side. Jamshid Sharmahd was abducted by Iran and held for years without a fair trial, in inhumane conditions and without the necessary medical care. Iran is responsible for his death."

== Diplomatic fallout ==
Sharmahd's abduction and execution worsened Germany–Iran relations. The day after he was put to death, Germany summoned Iran's charge d'affaires to register a formal diplomatic protest. The German ambassador to Iran, Markus Potzel, also submitted a protest to the Iranian authorities and was recalled to Berlin. The German Foreign Minister also ordered the closure of all three Iranian consulates in Germany (in Frankfurt, Hamburg, and Munich), leaving only the Iranian embassy in Berlin. As part of the closure of Iranian consulates general in Germany, 32 Iranian diplomats were stripped of their residence permits.

Josep Borrell, the European Union's High Representative for Foreign Affairs, called Sharmahd's execution "appalling" and said it was "seriously harming" EU–Iran relations. Borrell noted that the EU had imposed new sanctions against Iran shortly before Sharmahd was killed, and would consider additional "targeted and significant measures" against Iran, including adding its Islamic Revolutionary Guard Corps to the EU's list of terrorist groups.

== See also ==
- Extraordinary rendition
- List of foreign nationals detained in Iran
