= Capital punishment in Iran =

Executions in Iran 2011–2024 (Official, true number probably higher due to unreported cases. From 2015 onward, some established unreported cases have been taken into account as well.) View source data.

Capital punishment is a legal penalty in Iran. The list of crimes punishable by death includes murder; rape; child molestation; homosexuality; drug trafficking; armed robbery; kidnapping; terrorism; burglary; incest; fornication; adultery; sodomy; sexual misconduct; prostitution; plotting to overthrow the Islamic government; political dissidence; sabotage; arson; rebellion; apostasy; blasphemy; extortion; counterfeiting; smuggling; recidivist consumption of alcohol; producing or preparing food, drink, cosmetics, or sanitary items that lead to death when consumed or used; producing and publishing pornography; using pornographic materials to solicit sex; capital perjury; recidivist theft; certain military offences (e. g., cowardice, assisting the enemy); "waging war against God"; "spreading corruption on Earth"; espionage; and treason. Iran carried out at least 977 executions in 2015, at least 567 executions in 2016, and at least 507 executions in 2017. In 2018, there were at least 249 executions, at least 273 in 2019, at least 246 in 2020, at least 290 in 2021, at least 553 in 2022, at least 834 in 2023, and at least 901 executions in 2024. In 2023, Iran was responsible for 74% of all recorded executions in the world, with the UN confirming that at least 40 people were executed in one week in 2024. According to a report by Amnesty International, Iran was responsible for 64% of all recorded executions worldwide in 2024.

Despite international requests for his release, the Iranian government executed a British-Iranian national, Alireza Akbari, in January 2023, who once served as Iran's deputy defense minister. The execution was condemned by the UK and Prime Minister Rishi Sunak, who referred to it as politically motivated, and a "callous and cowardly act" carried out by a "barbaric regime".

State-sanctioned executions witnessed a rapid spike in numbers during 2023. In May 2023 alone, Iran executed at least 142 individuals, its highest monthly rate since 2015. At least 30 of those killed were from the predominantly Sunni Baluchistan. During the 2026 war in Iran, 146 people have been reportedly executed.

Iran is believed to execute the most people per capita. Iran claims that the execution numbers human-rights groups allege are "exaggerated", and that executions are only carried out "after a lengthy judicial process". Iranian officials insist that they are "fighting a large-scale drug war along its eastern borders, and the increase of drug lords and dealers causes a rise in executions". According to the BBC, Iran "carries out the second highest number of executions than any other country, after China".

== Capital crimes ==
Death sentences in Iran are, in theory, legal for a variety of crimes, such as armed robbery, treason, espionage, murder, certain military offenses, drug trafficking, rape, homosexuality, sodomy, sexual misconduct, incestuous relations, fornication, prostitution, plotting to overthrow the Islamic regime, political dissidence, sabotage, apostasy, blasphemy, adultery, producing and publishing pornography, burglary, recidivist consumption of alcohol, recidivist theft, rebellion, some economic crimes, kidnapping, terrorism and few others.

There are four classes of crimes in Iranian law: qesas crimes, hadd crimes, tazir crimes, and deterrent crimes.

number of execution by year
year	number	note
2020	267	
2021	314	42% for drug crimes
2022	582	49% were for murder, 44% for drug crimes
2023	853	more than half were for drug crimes
2024	972	most were for drug crimes
2025	1,639	

=== Court system ===
In Iran, laws are created by the Islamic Consultative Assembly, also known as the Parliament of Iran (Majlis). They must be verified by the Guardian Council and signed by the president of Iran. The laws must be consistent with Sharia, although many laws are derived from pre-revolution civil law, rather than Sharia. For example, while almost 80% of Iranian executions are for drug traffickers, drug trafficking laws are part of Iranian civil law, not Sharia law.

There are three types of criminal courts. Criminal courts of first instance try serious crimes, hadd crimes, and qesas crimes, such as murder, rape, and theft. These courts can issue death sentences. Criminal courts of second instance try misdemeanors and contraventions. The Islamic Revolutionary Courts try offenses aimed against the state and its associated institutions. Crimes include smuggling (e. g., of drugs or weapons), terrorism, counterfeiting, and treason. The revolutionary courts can also issue death sentences.

In most cases (about 90%), executions are carried out in a provincial prison in the province where the crime took place. In serious cases, the criminal is publicly executed at the spot where the crime was committed. Many serious criminals or drug-related criminals are sent to larger, more centralized prisons, such as Evin and Gohardasht Prisons in Tehran and Vakilabad Prison in Mashhad.

A death sentence can be appealed to the Supreme Court of Cassation of Iran, which can affirm or deny the sentence. If the Supreme Court of Cassation finds irregularities, it can send the case to a lower court for a re-trial. There is no limit on the number of times that a defendant may appeal, but if guilt is established, the Court will affirm the sentence. In murder and rape cases, the perpetrator can ask for forgiveness from the victim's family; in other cases, the perpetrator can ask for clemency from the "Amnesty and Pardons Commission" of Iran to reduce their sentences.

In 2011, an amendment to the Dangerous Drugs Act ended the official right of appeal for repeat drug offenders. Instead, they can directly appeal to the Prosecutor General of Iran. This change was made because the regular appeals courts were overloaded and could not carry out their work quickly due to a heavy volume of drug cases.

Often execution is delayed until the person completes a prison sentence. Some murder and rape cases are delayed for five years in order to maximize the possibility of forgiveness and reaching a settlement.

In Iran (as in other Muslim countries), there are two types of sentences resulting in death. The first is a "qesas-e-nafs" (retribution) sentence, when a murder victim's family refuses to forgive a murderer (see "Qesas crimes" below). The other type is a regular death sentence, "hokm-e-edam", for crimes such as rape and drug trafficking. These sentences are completely separate in Iranian law, and this has created some confusion in news sources when authorities say that a murder will not result in "execution", but in "qesas".

In 2015, Amnesty International argued that executions in Iran were after sentences by courts that were almost always "completely lacking in independence and impartiality", and that "Trials in Iran are deeply flawed, detainees are often denied access to lawyers, and there are inadequate procedures for appeal, pardon, and commutation".

=== Qesas crimes (murder) ===
In Sharia law, a qesas crime is a class of crime that can be punished by retribution. The Sharia crime of intentional murder (ghatl-e-amd) is one crime punished by qesas, which in this case is a life for a life.

Diyya is a private settlement claim between the victim's family and the perpetrator. The victim's family has the option to forgive the criminal by accepting diyya (a financial settlement to compensate for the family's loss) rather than allowing the perpetrator to be executed. Because murder is considered a private matter between the perpetrator and the victim's family, the state may not commute a qesas-e-nafs sentence. The conviction, but not the sentence, can be appealed. Judges may only recommend the course of action the family takes, and in many cases ask the family to forgive the murderer.

In many cases, judges try to persuade the family to forgive the murderer, even at times pressuring them to do so. Often, a murder execution is delayed for five years after the murder was committed in order to persuade the family to exercise forgiveness, and allow time for the murderer to pay diyya. If pardoned, the perpetrator still faces criminal penalties through the tazir code. Anybody who commits intentional murder must face a minimum of 2–3 years in prison, which is usually about the same time it takes to pay the diyya. Usually, longer sentences are given, and if other crimes were committed along with the murder, the person will serve a longer prison sentence, possibly even up to life imprisonment.

The perpetrator may be convicted for murder in the case of a confession, if there are two witnesses to the crime, if there are 50 sworn testimonies, and/or if one or more people testifies 50 times against the defendant. However, in practice, judges also allow circumstantial evidence.

Qesas cannot be applied in cases of self-defense or manslaughter, where the proof requirements above are not met, to minors (age 15 for boys, 9 for girls prior to 2008; after 2008, age 18 in most cases), to those declared insane, in a case where the victim is the perpetrator's spouse or spouse's lover and the perpetrator caught the spouse committing adultery, or in the case of a father murdering his children. In these cases, the perpetrator is punished through a tazir discretionary sentence, ranging from 2 years to life in prison. Sometimes the death penalty can be used regardless if the person has been found guilty of moharebeh ("spreading corruption on the earth"). Crimes of passion may not always be recognized as a legitimate defense, with the exception of a spouse caught committing adultery (punishable by imprisonment). People who murder in self-defense can usually be released after paying blood money to the victim's family, and the courts would usually help to facilitate that.

In the case of manslaughter or insufficient proof, the perpetrator is not required to pay diyya. If a murderer was working under someone else's orders, and can prove it, they may receive a tazir punishment such as imprisonment, fines, and/or whipping, but sometimes even death. In these cases, the person(s) who ordered the killing are subject to qesas or diyya. If a woman is killed carrying an unborn child after the first trimester, it is considered the murder of two people.

If the family demands retribution, they cannot receive diyya, although they may receive some minor civil restitution. Most cases (2/3) are resolved through diyya. Qesas executions are a minority of executions in Iran, consisting of 20–30% (although those executed for other crimes may have committed murder previously).

Diyya tables are set every year by the Iranian government. Diyya is equivalent to the price of 100 camels, and must be paid in cash. Diyya is doubled if the intentional murder is committed during the holy months Ramadan and Muharram. However, in practice, diyya is negotiated between the parties and they generally settle for more or less diyya than the official amount. If the person cannot pay diyya, they would be held in prison until the amount is paid, even if their regular discretionary prison sentence ends. Usually their family or friends are expected to help raise the amount, or in some cases the state can pay for it.

According to the official tables, the family of a female victim receives half the amount of diyya due to the family of a man (though the amount is equal in accidental death cases); however, in practice, diyya is negotiated, and usually the amount is equal, especially in recent years.

Before 2004, non-Muslims would receive half the diyya of a Muslim, but the law was changed to give Muslims and non-Muslims equal diyya.

=== Tazir/deterrent crimes ===
In Islamic criminal jurisprudence, a tazir crime is a crime that is punished according to a judge's discretion. A "deterrent crime" is a crime with a fixed sentence. Tazir punishments should generally be less severe. There are no strict proof requirements, as there are for hadd. Tazir and deterrent crimes are often comparable to a misdemeanor, though not in cases where the crime is deemed to be equal to a moharebeh/mofsede-fel-arz crime (see above).

Arms smuggling is punishable by death or life in prison if the offense is deemed to be at the level of "moharebeh". Possession, sale, and/or use of illegal military weapons may be punishable by death or life in prison.

Human trafficking is punishable by death or life in prison if the trafficked person was under 18 years of age, or if rape, murder, or financial exploitation occurred. Operation of prostitution rings is also punishable by death, as well as "making large-scale pornographic websites". A person operating a blog, website, or any type of internet application that is deemed to spread "corruption", "insulting of Islam", "terrorism/violence", or "treason" may be punishable by death. In most cases, lesser penalties are given.

Large-scale fraud or counterfeiting, if enough to disrupt the "financial stability of the Islamic Republic", or "intentionally aimed at undermining the government", is punishable by death or life in prison if at the level of "mofsede-fel-arz". In addition, people who act against the Islamic Republic, or are convicted of terrorism, can be sentenced to death for moharebeh or mofsede-fel-arz.

According to Iran's Anti-Narcotics Law, possession of narcotics is a felony punishable by death or life imprisonment if:

1. The person is found in possession of over 30 grams (1.1 ounces) of heroin, morphine, cocaine, LSD, methamphetamine, or similar drugs. The death sentence is not applied for first offenses where the sale was not completed, or the amount was less than 100 grams (3.5 ounces), or for repeat offenses where collective amount was 30–100 grams.
2. The person is found in possession of over 5000 grams/5 kilograms (11.02 lbs) of opium, hashish, or cannabis. The death sentence is not applied for first offenses where the sale was not completed, and the amount was less than 20 kilograms. The death sentence is also applied on the third conviction for possession of 5–20 kg of such drugs.
3. The person is found in possession of more than five kilograms of prescription or industrial drugs for illegal use, or is a repeat offender possessing 5-20 kilograms of such drugs.
4. The person is a repeat offender convicted with growing opium poppies for drug use, or cannabis.
5. The person is convicted of armed smuggling of any illegal narcotics, committing an armed crime while in possession of drugs, or being a member or head of a narcotics trafficking gang.

In drug cases, a record of the amount of drugs a person is caught with is kept, so that the information is available in the event of a later arrest. Once a certain cumulative amount above is reached, the person is sentenced to the death penalty or life imprisonment. The offense should be deemed tantamount to "mofsede-fel-arz", in order for the perpetrator to be executed.

Drug crimes, smuggling, and crimes against the stability of the country are tried in the Revolutionary Court system, a special court that handles such cases relating to national security. In 2011, the right of appeal was revoked for certain drug crimes, and, instead, the case must be appealed to the Prosecutor-General of Iran. Mitigating factors allow the judge to give a lesser penalty of life imprisonment (which can be decreased upon appeal). In practice, the majority of dealers get a prison sentence on first offense, but on the second or third offense, they are executed or sentenced to life imprisonment. In armed drug-smuggling cases, the prisoner often must serve a prison sentence prior to execution (typically 5–10 years). Most executed drug dealers have been implicated in other crimes at some point (including theft, robbery, rape, and murder).

Iran is currently fighting a major drug war on its provinces in the east, primarily the Sistan and Baluchistan province and parts of Khorasan province. Since Iran borders Afghanistan and Pakistan, the two largest opium-producing countries in the world, Iran is a major trafficking route to Europe and the west. Since 2000, up to 2,000 Iranian soldiers have died fighting armed drug cartels and smugglers. Most of Iran's executions are related to drug trafficking — a recent announcement by the judiciary said that 74% of executions in Iran were drug-related. In 2015, according to Iran's vice-president for women and family affairs, Shahindokht Molaverdi, in an unnamed village in Sistan and Baluchistan, every adult male was executed on drugs charges.

In 2016, lawmakers proposed a bill to end capital punishment for drug offences. A justice minister also supported the proposal.

=== Hudud crimes ===
Hudud crimes are mentioned in the Quran, and considered to be comparable to felonies. Some of these laws are part of Iran's penal code, while others are not. Their punishments are also described in the Quran and Hadith. Hadud crimes must be proven by confession, two witnesses (four witnesses in the case of adultery), or, in rare cases, by "judge's knowledge" (where, based on available evidence, the defendant's guilt is extremely obvious). If the prosecution cannot provide the proof for a hadud crime, it is tried as a lesser tazir crime. The application of hudud crimes differ significantly in Iran from what is prescribed by classical Sharia. Conviction for these require a high proof rate, and cannot be given when there is any reasonable doubt. All hudud crimes also have a tazir penalty, and in most cases, the perpetrator is sentenced to the tazir penalty. If a perpetrator is repentant, the hudud punishment could be pardoned.

In the majority of cases, people who commit a hudud offensive would be given tazir punishments, such as imprisonment or fines, but in some serious cases, the hudud punishment could be given in addition to it.

Moharebeh ("waging war against God", or "war against the State") is a charge levied against people who commit acts against the government. Another related crime is Mofsede-fel-arz, which is "spreading corruption on the earth", which can be applied for political crimes such as treason. The Iran's judiciary system has also used another related crime, Baghy, which is translated to "armed rebellion against the Islamic government", especially against protesters during the 2022 Mahsa Amini protests. These are punishable by death or life imprisonment.

Similarly, a court could find that, if a person's crimes (of any type) were heinous enough, and the person is a continued threat to society, they are guilty of "Mofsede-Fel-Arz" (spreading corruption on the earth), which is a related crime and punishable by death/imprisonment.

However, moharebeh and mofsede-fel-arz are famous for being political charges disguised as religious crimes. These are often levied against those involved in espionage, treason, activism, opposition to the government, or terrorism. In 2008, "operation of prostitution rings" and "running pornographic websites/businesses" were added to the list. Large-scale economic crimes that disrupt the economy are also punishable by death if the perpetrator is found guilty of mofsede-fel-arz. Belonging to an armed anti-regime opposition group, or being part of "riotous disturbances" / "armed acts" against the state, are punishable by death or imprisonment if the perpetrator is found guilty of moharebeh.

==== Adultery/sex crimes (zina) ====
===== Adultery =====
Adultery (zina-e-mohsen) is punishable by 100 lashes for unmarried people, and by death on the fourth offense. It is punishable by death (stoning) for married people, and in all cases of incest. If an unmarried non-Muslim male has sexual relations with a Muslim female, the non-Muslim male will be put to death. Four witnesses (rather than two witnesses) are required to prove adultery, the person must confess four times, or they must be convicted by judge's knowledge (through definite circumstantial evidence). If the person confesses twice, and is "repentant", or the victim's family forgives the adulterer, the judge can give a tazir (discretionary) sentence of 99 lashes instead, or imprisonment. Convictions and executions for this crime are extremely rare, usually only carried out in the case of death, and rare even then.

Between 1979 and 2002, 40–76 adultery/incest executions (by stoning) were recorded for both men and women. Even if the actual numbers are higher, the punishment is nonetheless rare in proportion to confirmed cases of adultery. The punishment is given mostly in aggravated circumstances when the four witnesses or a confession is available, and the spouse died. Most adulterers go unpunished, or receive a lighter sentence. Divorce is usually the most common method in dealing with adultery.

===== Rape =====
Rape (zina-be-onf) is related to adultery, has the same proof requirements, and is punishable by death (hanging). In Iran, for the most part, convictions are made either by confession or "judge's knowledge", rather than witnesses.

In many cases the rape victim settles the case by accepting compensation (jirah) in exchange for withdrawing the charges or forgiving the rapist. This is similar to diyya, but equal to a woman's dowry. A woman can also receive diyya for injuries sustained. Normally, the rapist still faces tazir penalties, such as 100 lashes and jail time for immoral acts, and often faces further penalties for other crimes committed alongside the rape, such as kidnapping, assault, and disruption of public order.

===== Sodomy =====
Sodomy (lavat) is punishable by death. The judge can determine the type of death, but in practice, it is always hanging. The proof requirements are the same as for adultery, and such sentences are very rare. If one of the consenting participants was under 18, the punishment is 100 lashes for the minor. If the guilty is repentant, they generally receive a reduced sentence of 99 lashes. All people convicted of sodomy spend one year in prison in addition, and can be sentenced to more prison time at the judge's discretion. Few people are sentenced to death for sodomy, but prior to 2012, both partners could receive the death penalty.

==== Drinking ====
Consumption of alcohol (one glass) is punished by 80 lashes, but repeated offences may lead to death penalty, although rarely exercised. In 2012, two men were sentenced to death after a third offense in Khorasan. The sentence was confirmed by the Supreme Court, but it may be commuted to flogging if the convicted repent. On 9 July 2020, a man was executed in Mashhad for drinking alcohol. The judicial system later confirmed the execution and defended it by saying that he had drinking offenses before.

===== Other =====
Apostasy (murrtaad) is not codified in the penal code, but is nevertheless subject to prosecution by Iranian courts, due to the primary role of Sharia in the legal system. Some two hundred members of the Baha'i religion, an indigenous faith, but proscribed as a form of apostasy, have been hanged, while many have been and are imprisoned. A range of serious and petty sanctions are routinely placed on the Baha'i community, including a ban on young adherents attending university. The death sentence could be given for a male, though the last such execution was in 1990. A case is Youcef Nadarkhani, an Iranian Christian Pastor sentenced to death for apostasy 21–22 September 2010 in the province of Gilan, but the sentence has not been carried out. For women, the maximum sentence is life in prison.

Blasphemy (sabb-al-nabi) of the Islamic prophet Muhammad, his daughter, or his family is a crime in Iran, and a blasphemer would be found guilty of apostasy as well by default. Blasphemy is punishable by death or imprisonment.

For all other hudud crimes, the fourth offense would be a capital offense, unless the person repents.

Other hudud crimes include incest, theft (serghat-e-haddi), lesbianism (mosahegheh), false accusation of sex crimes (ghazf), pimping (ghavvadi), and drunkenness (shurb-e-khamr). However, for all but the most serious cases, the crime is punished through the tazir code, and the judge gives a discretionary sentence.

=== Offenders under age 18 ===
The execution of minors in Iran has been a major issue for human rights groups. As of May 2009, there were at least 137 known juvenile offenders awaiting execution in Iran, but the total number could be much higher, as many death penalty cases in Iran are believed to go unreported. Of the 43 child offenders recorded as having been executed since 1990, 11 were still under the age of 18 at the time of their execution, while the others were either kept on death row until they had reached 18, or were convicted and sentenced after reaching that age. In 2006, a teenage girl of the age of 16, Atefah Sahaaleh, was sentenced to death, and executed two weeks later by hanging in a public square for the charges of adultery and "crimes against chastity". Death row prisoners sentenced while underage include at least one at 13-year-old (executed at 21) and a 14-year-old (executed at 18).

Despite signing the convention on the Rights of the Child, Iran, according to human rights groups, is the world's largest executioner of juvenile offenders. This has been ascribed to the difference in definition of a "minor" between non-Muslim and (some) Muslim countries. Article 49 of the Islamic Penal Code in Iran defines a child as "someone who has not reached the age of puberty (bulugh) as stipulated by Islamic law and as specified in the 1991 Civil Code as 15 lunar years for boys and nine lunar years for girls." Since 1995, Iran's Supreme Court has commuted non-murder death sentences to 2–8 years in prison.

In February 2012, Iran adopted a new penal code, which officially banned the death penalty for minors under the age of 18 in favor of "social penalties" and "educational programs". Minors who commit murder when aged 15–18 can still receive the death penalty in rare cases if the judge is confident that the perpetrator had reached full adult mental development at the time of the crime and that it was committed intentionally with a well thought-out plan. For minors by default and for young adults (older than 18) with low mental development, execution is not used and the perpetrator is prosecuted in a juvenile court. Iran uses the lunar Islamic calendar to determine the age of criminal responsibility, which is shorter than the standard solar calendar, so as a result some people sentenced to death at the age of 18 would be 17 years old in solar calendar years.

== Criticism ==
Iran has garnered media attention and criticism for carrying out executions of minors, despite having signed the Convention on the Rights of the Child, which forbids executing child offenders for crimes committed under the age of 18. Iran justifies its actions by claiming dispensation in cases where the convention is deemed "incompatible with Islamic jurisprudence". Iran has also been criticized for using stoning as capital punishment, though in 2005, an Iranian judiciary spokesman strongly denied the accusations of stoning and executing minors, describing them as "propaganda against the Iranian state".

At Berlin International Film Festival, on 29 February 2020 Iranian film about executions (There Is No Evil) won top prize.

== Methods ==
=== Hanging ===
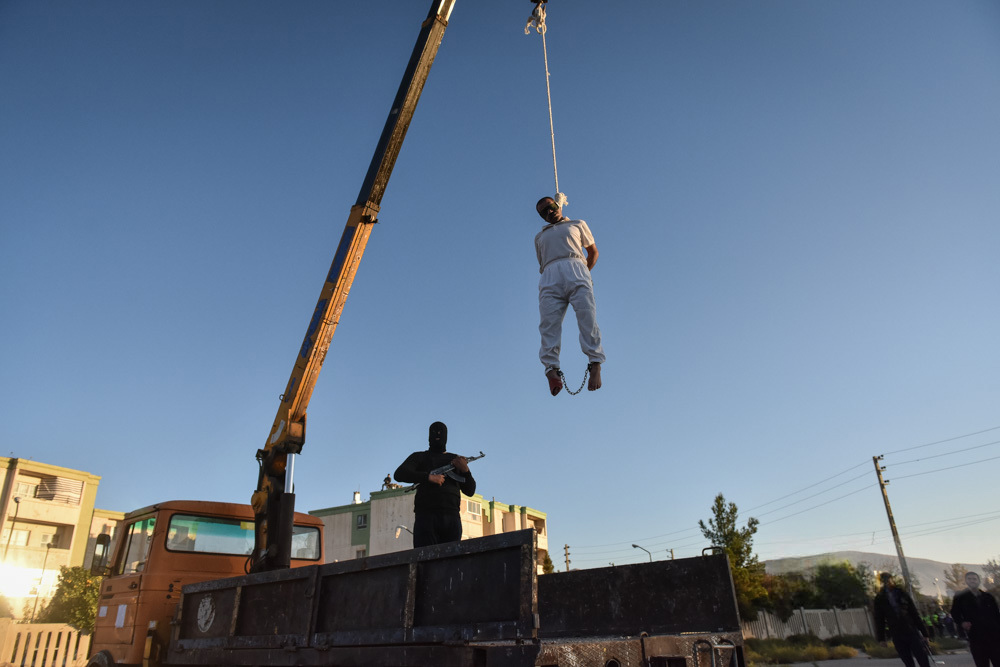
Public hanging being carried out in Shiraz, 2018

Hanging is the only common method of execution in 21st-century Iran, usually carried out in prison.

Compared to other countries that use hanging (such as Japan or Malaysia) with a complex gallows designed to drop the condemned and break the neck, Iran's gallows are very simple and inexpensive. They consist only of a frame and a stool, with some stools able to hold up to seven people at a time and having wheels. Public executions are usually carried out by a mobile crane. Sometimes, the convicted suspect is suspended from the crane, but more often, the crane is used as a gallows, and the person is pulled off a stool (see Upright jerker). The victim is usually blindfolded. Iranian nooses are thick, with 7–10 knotted coils, and are often made of blue plastic rope with little to no drop. Death is caused by strangulation and carotid reflex (where blood vessels to the head are cut off), taking 10–20 minutes, causing visible pain and distress to the condemned.

Famous hangings in Iran include Sheikh Fazlollah Nouri in 1909, and serial killer Mohammed Bijeh, the "Desert Vampire", who raped and murdered 17 boys, in 2005. At dawn, on 27 July 2007, 29 men were hanged in Evin Prison on various charges of murder and drug trafficking. In 2010, Shahla Jahed was hanged in Tehran for the 2002 murder of the wife of Iran footballer Nasser Mohammadkhani. In 2006, a teenage girl of the age of 16, Atefeh Sahaaleh, was sentenced to death, and executed two weeks later by hanging in a public square for the charges of adultery and "crimes against chastity". In 2009, a public execution of two men in Sirjan for armed robbery was broken up when relatives stormed the gallows and cut the men down while still alive; they were later re-captured and hanged until dead. A video of the incident was posted on the Internet.

=== Firing squad ===
Execution by firing squad is legal, but seldom used in Iran today. Historically, it was used for military and political crimes. In 1974, under the Shah's regime, Marxist activists Khosrow Golesorkhi and Keramat Daneshian were executed by firing squad on charges of conspiring to kidnap Reza Pahlavi, the Crown Prince of Iran. They were shot after a televised trial in Tehran. This case was one of the big events that turned public opinion against the Shah. During the 38 years in which the Shah reigned, 1,000 or more people were sentenced to death for crimes against the government, mostly by firing squad after conviction by a special SAVAK military tribunal.

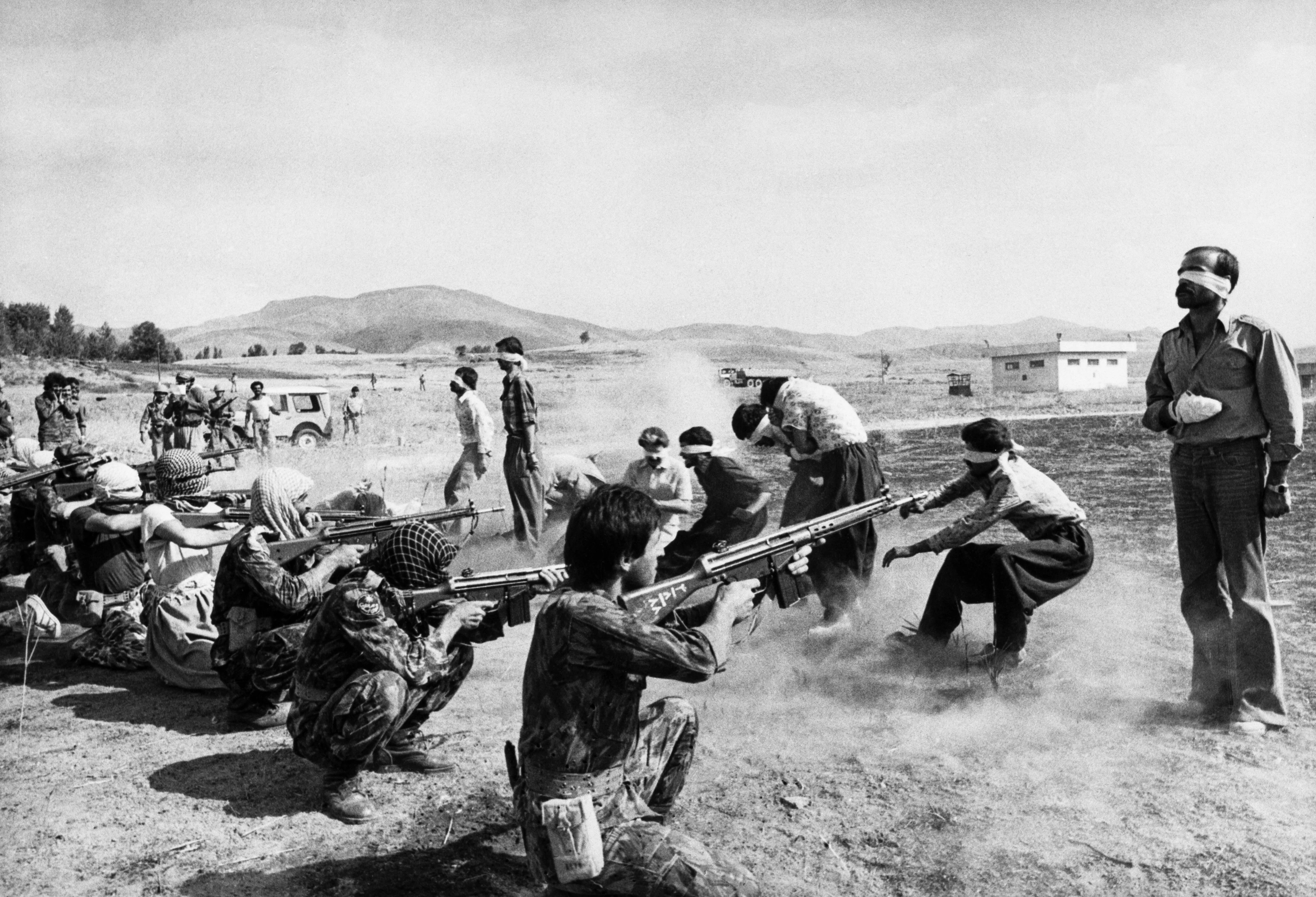
Pulitzer-winning photograph: "Firing Squad in Iran" (1979)

In the years after the Islamic Revolution of 1979, thousands of people were sentenced to be shot for political offenses including drug trafficking, and crimes against the Islamic Republic by the newly established Revolutionary Courts. These included many of the Shah's former ministers, such as former prime minister Amir Abbas Hoveida, and the head of SAVAK General Nematollah Nassiri. By 1980, one year after the Shah was overthrown, the new Islamic Republic executed over 700 people by firing squad. Many of the members of the former regime are suspected to have been unjustly executed in biased trials. A campaign against drug trafficking resulted in the executions of many for drug possession, including addicts, often based on minimal evidence. Some of these people were also alleged opponents of the regime.

In 1982, a purge of communists in Iran (such as the Tudeh Party) resulted in executions of the party's leaders and some members on charges of spying for the Soviet Union. Political executions continued on a lesser scale. When the Islamic Penal Code of Iran was adopted in 1982, ordinary crimes began to be punished by hanging once again by regular, non-Revolutionary courts. Political opponents continued to be executed by firing squads, but on a lesser scale.

In 1988 the government secretly executed 2,000–4,000 political prisoners, many former members or sympathizers of the Mujahedeen group, former communists, and other dissidents. Those executed had all renounced their former ties to their old opposition organizations and many were about to finish their prison sentences when they were suddenly and secretly executed. The charges were "moharebeh" or apostasy, seen by critics as a gross example of using a religious charge for political reasons. They were executed by hanging for most part, but a few were executed by firing squad.

Since 1988, political executions have been less common, although extrajudicial killing of high-profile regime opponents continued until 1998, such as the Chain murders. Since the late 1980s, virtually all executions have been carried out by hanging, both political or criminal.

Critics of the Revolutionary Courts complained about the process, stating that the trials lacked defense attorneys, were too short (often lasting hours, even minutes), and could not be appealed and that there was a lack of evidence and convictions were often based on strong rumors, with political opponents being unjustly prosecuted and sentences. Critics also complained that the judges were biased, unfair, too rigid, used the death sentence much too often, and applied the death penalty to undeserving people. There were also criticisms of confessions obtained through torture. When asked what if a person was wrongfully executed, one of the judges said that an innocent person "would receive a reward by God in heaven"; so, little care was taken to see if the accused were actually guilty.

Ayatollah Khomeini himself was sentenced to death by firing squad for treason against the Shah in 1964, by a military court, but his sentence was commuted to exile in Iraq (General Hassan Pakravan, another head of SAVAK who helped commute Khomeini's sentence, was one of the first shot upon Khomeini's return).

One of the most famous "hanging" judges in Iran was a cleric, Sadegh Khalkhali, the first head of the Revolutionary Court, who sentenced drug traffickers and former members of the Shah's government alike to be shot. He personally sentenced 800–2,000 people to death. In 1980, Jahangir Razmi won the Pulitzer Prize for his famous photo "Firing Squad in Iran", which showed seven Kurds and two Shah's policemen being executed minutes after being convicted for "terrorism and crimes against God" by Khalkhali in the airport in Sanandaj, during a revolt by Kurdish armed groups. Their trial lasted 30 minutes.

After many years of not being used, the firing squad was last used in 2008, to execute a man convicted of raping 17 children, according to the Fars News Agency. The man had originally been sentenced to death by sword decapitation, but the Iranian Supreme Court ultimately approved his execution by firing squad.

=== Stoning ===
Individuals sentenced to stoning are placed in a stoning pit, buried to the neck (women) or waist (men), and others hurl stones at them until they escape the stoning pit, are incapacitated, or are killed. Because men (unlike women) are only buried to the waist, men occasionally do escape the stoning pit, which terminates the penalty. Mohammad-Javad Larijani, chief of Iran's Human Rights Council (in 2010), rejected international condemnations of stoning, saying that, "in the eyes of some people, stoning is a lesser punishment than execution because there is a chance you should survive." However, there are at least two newspaper reports of women managing to pull themselves out of their hole while being stoned, but being killed nonetheless after being forced back into the hole. Iranian law mandates that stones used must be small enough to not kill instantly. According to Shaparak Khorsandi, in stoning executions in Iran, most victims are dead within two hours of the first stone throw.

While "Iran does not publish how many people are stoned or sentenced to stoning each year", and it is "very difficult to provide systematic reporting and empirical data on stoning of women inside Iran", information has been gleaned by human rights groups from newspaper reports. Reports from Amnesty International and International Committee Against Executions (ICAE) tally a total of 150 people executed by stoning in Iran from 1980 to 2009.

Stoning was temporarily blocked as legal punishment by Supreme Leader Ruhollah Khomeini's order in 1981. Following vociferous domestic and international controversy over stoning in the early years of the Islamic Republic, the government placed a moratorium on stoning in 2002. In January 2005, the Iranian judiciary spokesman Jamal Karimirad was quoted as saying, "Stoning has been dropped from the penal code for a long time, and in the Islamic republic, we do not see such punishments being carried out", further adding that if stoning sentences were passed by lower courts, they were overruled by higher courts, and "no such verdicts have been carried out". Contradicting this, in 2008 "the Iranian Judiciary confirmed that a man was stoned to death for adultery in Qazvin Province on 5 July", and according to the International Campaign for Human Rights in Iran, "six people were stoned to death between 2006 and 2008 and an additional 13 people await their sentence from Iranian prisons". In 2012, stoning was officially removed from the code and replaced by an unspecified death penalty. In theory, it could still be used as a punishment because the penal code allows judges to impose sentencing according to "valid Islamic sources" and Sharia punishments. There were reports by the opposition Melli-Mazhabi Web site of a stoning sentence being carried out in 2012. The Tehran Forensic Medicine Department rejected those claims without providing explanations for the causes of death.

As of 19 November 2019, the International Federation for Human Rights issued a statement that "stoning for adultery" was still "stipulated in law" in Iran; that "several persons are still on death-row" with a sentence of stoning, and that "in 2018, two women were sentenced to stoning".

=== Falling from heights ===
Iran is accused of using this form of execution for punishing homosexuality. According to Amnesty International in 2008, Tayyeb Karimi and Yazdan were convicted of abduction, rape and theft and sentenced to death by a judge in Shiraz, Fars province, southern Iran, in May 2007. They were to be thrown off a cliff or from a great height. The judge ordered that they be executed in the way described. Four other men have been sentenced to 100 lashes each for their involvement in the same crimes.

== Typical execution ==
=== In prison ===
Although, by law, all executions must take place in "public", the location is not usually specified. In most cases, executions take place in the main prison of the county or province where the crime took place, in front of witnesses (family, prosecutors, other prisoners).

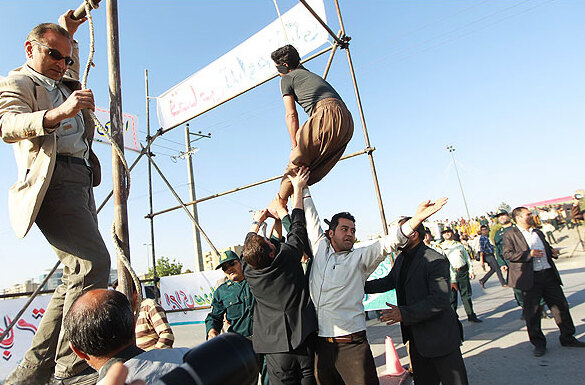
Vahid Zare robbed and murdered a young soldier, was sentenced to death, hanged by a crane yet pardoned in extremis by the family of his victim. He was rescued from the gallows (see picture) and transported to a hospital.

Criminals from Tehran are hanged in Evin Prison (and according to some reports in Ghezel Hesar Prison in some cases). Amnesty International reported on cases in which prisoners were transferred from Evin Prison to Ghezel Hesar before their execution, often after trials criticized as unfair and involving allegations of torture or forced confessions. In the Karaj area, Gohardasht Prison carries out executions. Tehran's Qasr Prison also conducted executions until it closed in 2005. In Mashhad, executions are carried out in Vakilabad Prison. The gallows are typically located in a large indoor shed, or in a remote courtyard.

1–2 days prior to the execution, the prisoner is informed of their execution date and moved to solitary confinement. In murder cases (and often rape cases), both the victim's and prisoner's family are required to be there by law, in order to keep the possibility of a forgiveness settlement open. In non-murder executions, sometimes, the prisoner's family is informed after the fact. Usually the condemned may see relatives prior to the execution. The prisoner's attorney may also attend the execution.

Executions are carried out at 4 am local time, just before the call for morning salat (prayer). When the platform is moved away, the condemned dies of strangulation and loss of blood to the brain. Usually they fall unconscious within seconds. If the condemned struggles after being released, the prison guards will typically pull down on the rope to speed up the death.

In the case of a murder, the victim's next of kin is allowed to pull the stool out from under the condemned. There have been occasions where the victim's family pardoned the murderer right at the foot of the gallows. A few times, the person was pardoned and cut down from the gallows after surviving the hanging process.

=== In public ===
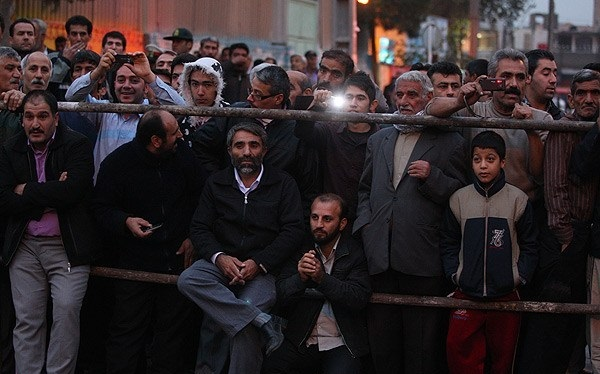
Iranians observing a public execution.

Public executions in Iran are less common, sometimes applied to those found guilty of crimes such as gang rape, child murder, murder during an armed robbery, or massive drug trafficking. Public executions were restricted between the 1920s and 1950s for the most part, but became common after the Islamic Revolution, usually carried out from mobile cranes. In 2008, Iran banned public execution; however, the moratorium has not gone into effect as of 2011, according to Amnesty International. They take place when the prosecutor requests and the judge accepts that since the criminal's crimes were so terrible they "caused public outrage", the criminal must die at the spot where the crime was committed. The Supreme Court must also approve the sentence. It is estimated that about 5–10% of executions are carried out in public, usually around 6 am local time.

In 2002, the "Black Vultures", the nickname of a group of five men who assaulted and gang raped dozens of women in northern Tehran, were hanged in public from cranes, two in the main bus terminal and three in the main square of Lavizan district.

On 2 August 2007, Maijid and Hossein Kavousifar were hanged in downtown Tehran for murdering a judge, as well as shooting and killing two innocent bystanders during an earlier bank robbery.

On 5 January 2011, a man only identified by Iranian media as "Yaghub" was hanged in the main square of the Sa'adat Abad district in Tehran, where he had in October 2010 murdered a man by repeatedly stabbing him and then stood over the victim while he bled to death threatening to kill anyone who intervened. The murder was recorded on a mobile phone.

=== Further examples ===
- Asghar the Murderer was executed for raping and killing 33 young adults.
- Mohammed Bijeh was executed for raping and killing 16 young boys and 2 adults.
- Amirhossein Pourjafar was executed for rape, murder and body mutilation of a 7-year-old girl.
- Saeed Hanaei was executed for killing 16 female prostitutes and drug addicts.

=== Controversies ===
In July 2005, the Iranian Student News Agency, a partially government-funded press agency, covered the execution of Mahmoud Asgari and Ayaz Marhoni in Mashhad who, as initially reported by Iranian sources, were executed for committing homosexual acts; however, when disturbing photos of the hanging were widely distributed around the Internet, and drew international attention and condemnation, it resulted in subsequent allegations by the Iranian regime that they were executed for the rape of a 13-year-old boy. The executions of the two teenagers divided the human rights community over whether it was a gay issue, but all human rights groups condemned the hangings, as they were for crimes allegedly committed when the boys were minors. The initial report from the Iranian Student News Agency had stated that they were hanged for sodomizing and raping a 13-year-old boy (his father was interviewed about the case in the local Mashad newspaper). Online gay advocacy groups such as OutRage! asserted that they were hanged for being homosexuals; other groups, in light of evidence that the teenagers were convicted of rape, emphasized that the executions were a violation of the UN Convention on the Rights of the Child and the International Covenant on Civil and Political Rights (Iran is a signatory to both), which prohibit the execution of minors. After the international outcry, the Iranian government repeated once again that the hangings were for raping the boy. However, others still allege that they were hanged for being gay. Later that year, another two young men, referred to in the media by their first names, Mokhtar and Ali, were hanged in the northern city of Gorgan for lavat (sodomy).

In 2010, Arash Rahmanipour and Mohammad-Reza Ali Zamani were hanged in Tehran for moharebeh, alleged terrorism, and being a member of the banned Kingdom Assembly of Iran. When they were executed, their execution was falsely reported as being connected to the 2009 election protests, possibly in order to intimidate the opposition, despite their arrest months before the election. Abdolreza Ghanbari's moharebeh death sentence for protesting in the 2009 Ashura protests was upheld in March 2012, meaning that his execution could be carried out at any time. In 2012, 5 Ahwazi Arabs were hanged in retaliation for the alleged death of a policeman during riots a year before. In 2011, when the riots originally took place, 9 men were hanged in retaliation for alleged "deaths and rapes" during the riots, three of them in public. One of them was 16 years old when hanged.

In 2011, two policemen were hanged in Tehran for beating to death three protesters in the Kahrizak Detention Center during the 2009 election protests.

In 2014, Reyhaneh Jabbari was hanged for killing a man she alleged was trying to sexually abuse her, despite an international campaign that sought to avoid her execution.

On 3 May 2016, Reza Hosseini, 34, was executed in Ghezel Hesar prison on alleged drug charges after a revolutionary court trial that lasted a couple of minutes. His wife insists Hosseini was innocent. She says Hosseini was arrested because he got into an altercation with the authorities, and the drugs were actually discovered by authorities in another place. Hosseini never pleaded guilty. At that, Judge Tayerani replied: "If you are innocent, then you will go to heaven after you are hanged."

On 20 December 2018, Human Rights Watch urged the regime in Iran to investigate and find an explanation for the death of Vahid Sayadi Nasiri, who had been jailed for insulting the Supreme Leader Ali Khamenei. According to his family, Nasiri had been on hunger strike, but he was denied medical attention before he died.

On 12 September 2020, Navid Afkari was executed for murder. The U.S. State Department believed he had been tortured into giving a false confession.

On 12 December 2020, the journalist Ruhollah Zam was executed for "spreading corruption on Earth."

On 5 September 2022, Iran's official IRNA news agency reported that the two women, LGBT rights activists Zahra Seddiqi Hamedani and Elham Choubdar, had been sentenced to death on charges of "corruption on earth" and human trafficking. The European Union condemned the death sentences on 13 September 2022.

On 8 December 2022, Mohsen Shekari, aged 23, was executed by hanging. A Revolutionary Court had found him guilty of enmity against God and of wounding a member of a paramilitary force with a machete. He had been taking part in the Mahsa Amini protests.

On 12 December 2022, Majidreza Rahnavard, aged 23 was publicly hanged in Mashhad for Moharebeh in connection to killing two members of the Basij Resistance Force, Danial Rezazadeh, and Hossein Zeinalzadeh, during the Mahsa Amini protests. His execution resulted in international condemnation. The execution was carried out only 23 days after his arrest. Human rights organizations such as the United Nations have expressed distress and concern that protesters are being sentenced to death following sham trials with no due process. Rahnavard's mother was only informed of his execution after his death and was later given the cemetery's name and plot number. Upon arrival at the cemetery, Rahnavard's family were welcomed by the sight of security guards burying his body. A vote was cast in November by the UN Human Rights Council to initiate an investigation into Iran's handling of the demonstrations. Still, Tehran refused to cooperate because the mission was "political." On Wednesday, 14 December 2022, Iran's expulsion from the UN Commission on the Status of Women will be put to a vote, which the UN Watch predicts will pass overwhelmingly despite Tehran's objections. Australia and New Zealand have recently joined the United States, the European Union, the United Kingdom, and Canada in blacklisting a handful of Iranian officials and entities in response to the ongoing protests, which Tehran has condemned. Rahnavard's execution on Monday, similar to Shekari's, showed how quickly the Iranian judiciary is handling cases involving the protests. He was executed less than a month after his arrest. On 17 November, the judiciary claimed Rahnavard committed a "terrorist" act, and two days later, he was reportedly arrested for "Moharebeh," the Farsi definition for "waging war against God." Majidreza Rahnavard's trial took place in Mashhad, Khorasan-e Razavi Province, over the course of just one session before a Revolutionary Court. November 29 where he was convicted of "enmity against God" (Moharebeh). Rahnavard was denied access to a lawyer of his own choice. He was assigned a lawyer, but didn't present a defense, similarly to Mohsen Shekari, who, according to Iran Human Rights, was denied access to his lawyer during his interrogation and legal proceedings.

Furthermore, the acceleration of this specific use of the death penalty proves it to have most uncompromising and extreme element, all under the leadership of supreme leader Ali Khamenei. Originally, the protests sparked opposition to force the veiling of women in response to the death in custody of 22-year-old Mahsa Amini. A dozen others have been suspected and sentenced to death, and other activists are being warned to be careful. Certain situations, such as closed-door hearings, are an aspect of this as well. Another young male, 23-year-old Mahan Sedarat, faces execution after the judiciary confirmed his sentence. Through social media, others were raising awareness and attempting to revoke his sentence and save his life. The young man was transferred to Rajaei Shahr prison in the city of Karaj, which ended up being the place where his execution occurred. It is known that at least 488 people have officially been killed during protests in Iran for standing up for what they believe in. From a bigger perspective, another 18,200 have likely been detained by officials in Iran.

Since 2022, and specifically after the Mahsa Amini protest, capital punishment in Iran has become highly disputed, as the government has used it as a political tool for repression. Many were executed after very quick trials, raising criticism for being unfair, as the victim's confections were forced by torture. For three consecutive years, there has been a high increase in the amount of executions in Iran, even for non violent crimes. This causing Human rights organization to conclude the government is using executions as a means of intimidation and control.

As of April 2026, the year 2025 was the highest in executions committed by the Islamic Republic, with at least 1,639 people put to death, an average of about 4 per day, though the exact number is a state secret in Iran An additional 500 people may have been executed, but have not been confirmed. According to a report by NGOs Iran Human Rights (IHR) and Together Against the Death Penalty (EPCM), over half of the executions were carried out by Revolutionary Courts after "grossly unfair trials and without due process".

During the 2026 Iran war, executions were used to suppress the population by sentencing protesters, political prisoners, and alleged spies after fast, often unfair trials. Human rights organizations claimed the war was an excuse to increased use of the death penalty to suppress dissent and maintain control.

On 20 February 2026, Amnesty International warned that at least 8 people, allegedly linked to the January 2026 protests, were sentenced to death in expedited "torture-tainted grossly unfair trials". An additional 22 individuals, two of whom children, were reportedly at risk of facing the death penalty, after being denied legal council during the investigation and being refused external legal representation appointed by their families, and after their "confessions" were extracted through torture. In response, Amnesty International called on the International community to pressure the Iranian authorities "to stop using the court system as a conveyor belt for executions" and on UN member states to petition the UN Security Council for the prosecution of those responsible for human rights violations in the Islamic Republic of Iran. By 5 April, three of the convicted, Amirhossein Hatami, Mohammadamin Biglari and Shahin Vahedparast, had been executed by the Revolutionary Courts.

On 25 February, Le Monde quoted a source familiar with the Islamic Repblic judicial system, who said "As long as the threat of an American attack hangs over the country, the execution machine will not be fully set in motion. If the regime stabilizes and this pressure disappears, many [prisoners] will be hanged." However, according to Human Rights monitor, during the first three months of 2026, at least 656 executions had already been carried out by Iranian authorities, while many more were believed to have been executed under the cover of Iran's 2026 internet shutdown.

== Public advocacy against capital punishment in Iran ==
At the 76th Cannes Film Festival, Iranian model Mahlagha Jaberi wore a symbolic gown designed by Jila Saber. The dress featured a halter neckline shaped like a noose, on the back of the dress appeared the text "Stop Executions", although festival security intervened, and she was prevented from displaying it on the red carpet, in line with Cannes rules limiting political statements. The dress was intended as a political statement against executions in Iran, aimed to raise global awareness of increasing use of the death penalty in Iran.

== See also ==
- Crime in Iran
- Execution of Behrouz Ehsani and Mehdi Hassani
- Human rights in Iran
- 2025–2026 Iranian protests
