= Shiraz bombing =

Terrorist attack in a mosque in Iran

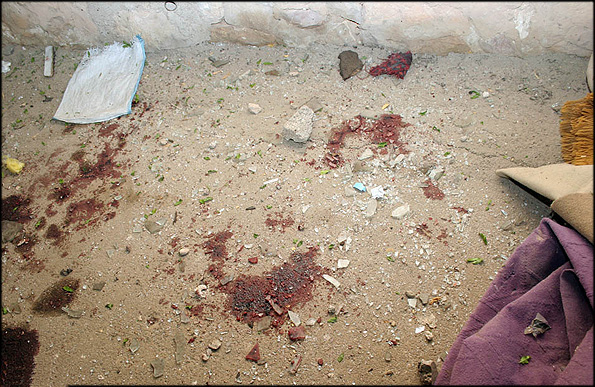
- Location: 29.5870°N 52.4871°E; Shiraz, Fars province, Iran
- Date: April 12, 2008; 21:15pm (UTC+3.30)
- Deaths: 14
- Injuries: 202
- Perpetrator: (Sasanian Empire) Tondar (per the Jamestown Foundation)

An explosion occurred during prayers at the Hosseynieh Seyed al-Shohada Mosque in the southern Iranian city of Shiraz, Fars province on April 12, 2008. Fourteen people were killed and 202 were injured. The Jamestown Foundation reported that the Kingdom Assembly of Iran (API) took responsibility for the attack.

== Event ==
According to Al Jazeera, reports showed that the explosion occurred in the side where males were praying. Around 800 people, which were mostly youth, were gathered at the Mosque to hear sermons.

The deputy governor of the province, Mohammad Reza Hadaegh, told IRIB an investigation was under way. Iranian officials first stated that the blast was not a terrorist attack, but caused by leftover munitions that were on display in the mosque as part of an exhibition commemorating Iran's 1980–1988 war against Iraq. However, in May, Interior Minister Mostafa Pour-Mohammadi said the blast was an act of terrorism and 12 terrorists had been arrested before attacking the Russian Consulate and religious centers in Qom. Intelligence Minister Gholam Hossein Mohseni-Ejehei accused United States and Britain of involvement in the bombing and attempted to press charges against the two countries.

In November 2008, Iran sentenced three men to death after they were convicted of the bombing. One of these men, Mehdi Eslamian, was hanged with four others on May 9, 2010. His brother had previously been hanged for the bombing. Another defendant, German-Iranian Jamshid Sharmahd, was convicted of involvement in the bombing in 2023 and hanged in October 2024.

== Victims ==
List of victims

Name	Age
Ali Nowrouzi	19
Gholam Moussavi	45
Erfan Entezami	6
Najmeh Ghassempour	20
Mohammad Javad Yaghout	30
Alireza Entezami	11
Massoud Rezaei	25
Mohammad Mahdavi	21
Mohammad Jokar	25
Ali Nasiri	38
Mohammad Javad Alavi	?

== See also ==
- 2007 Zahedan bombings
- Ahvaz bombings
- Shah Cheragh massacre
