= Gazelle Sharmahd =

Human rights activist

- Born: Tehran, Iran
- Occupation: Human rights activist
- Father: Jamshid Sharmahd

Gazelle Sharmahd is a human rights activist based in the United States. She campaigned for the release of her father, Jamshid Sharmahd, following his abduction in 2020. In 2024, she launched #CutTheRope, a campaign opposing executions in Iran.

== Background ==
Sharmahd was born in Tehran, Iran, and grew up in Hanover, Germany. She later worked as a nurse in a cardiac intensive-care unit in Los Angeles. Following her father's abduction, she left nursing and devoted herself to campaigning.

== Advocacy ==
After her father was abducted in Dubai in 2020 and taken to Iran, Sharmahd called on the German and US governments to secure his release. Her campaign included media appearances, social media advocacy, and public protests.

In March 2023, she visited Berlin, where she met politicians including Friedrich Merz, and urged the German government to apply public pressure on Iran. She criticized its strategy of quiet diplomacy. The German Foreign Office said it had worked on the case from the outset through diplomatic channels.

On 21 June 2023, Sharmahd filed a criminal complaint with Germany's federal prosecutor, with the support of the European Center for Constitutional and Human Rights. The complaint alleged crimes against humanity by eight members of Iran's judiciary and intelligence services in connection with her father's abduction and detention.

In February 2024, she launched #CutTheRope, calling for an end to executions in Iran. The initiative encouraged participants to publish photographs or videos using the hashtag. Supporters included former prisoners Nazanin Zaghari-Ratcliffe and Kylie Moore-Gilbert.

On 30 April 2024, Sharmahd spoke at a US House Foreign Affairs Committee roundtable on Americans detained abroad. She urged lawmakers to seek more information from the administration about efforts to secure detainees' release.

On 15 May 2024, she delivered a remote address to the 16th Geneva Summit for Human Rights and Democracy, discussing her father's detention and her campaign.

Following her father's death in Iranian custody in 2024, Sharmahd called for the return of his remains and clarification of the circumstances of his death. His body was transferred to Germany in February 2025. In April 2025, she attended a memorial in Berlin and continued calling for answers about his death.
