= Isfahan Central Prison =

Prison in Isfahan, Iran

- Interactive map of Isfahan Central Prison
- Location: Esfahan, Iran; 32°36′15″N 51°34′51″E
- Capacity: 2200
- Population: 8/5k
- Managed by: the Judiciary system Prisons Organization, General Directorate of Prisons and Provisional and Correctional Measures of Isfahan Province
- Website: https://www.prisons.ir/service/Provinces/esfahan

Isfahan Central Prison, also called Dastgerd Prison, is a prison in south Isfahan, Isfahan province, Iran, on the Zobahan freeway. There have been numerous accounts of human rights abuses against prisoners there. It is highly crowded prison, and there are plans to replace it with a new prison located outside the city.

== Organization ==
The Iranian intelligence community and Investigation police have their own wards.

== History ==
At least 230 confirmed executions occurred at the prison during the 1988 executions of Iranian political prisoners.

In 2013, six prisoners attempted to escape via a hand dug tunnel measuring 23 meters.

The prison has carried out capital punishment against prisoners since at least 2009, including the execution of minors. The prison has been used to detain arrested protesters since 2017. Multiple protests have occurred near or outside the prison to express disapproval of death sentences and prisoner mistreatment.

In 2020, the United States placed sanctions on Isfahan Central Prison, alongside Zahedan Prison, due to alleged human rights abuses of "responsible for extrajudicial killings and arbitrary detention", and that Isfahan held more prisoners than it had the capacity to. As of 2020 2500 prisoners worked outside the prison.

== Mahsa Amini protests ==
Since September 2022, when the death of Mahsa Amini incited protests across the country, the prison has served both as a holding place for arrested protesters and as a site of protest against the execution of prisoners. There have been reports of torture against the detained protesters.

== Planned replacement ==
The new prison will be in the east and will be 80,000 hectares, making it three times larger than the current prison. The old building will be sold and repurposed.

== See also ==
- District 13, Isfahan
