= Mohammad-Reza Ali-Zamani =

Iranian activist (1972–2010)

- محمدرضا علی‌زمانی
- Born: 1972; Iran
- Died: 28 January 2010 (aged 38)

Muhammed-Reza Ali-Zamani (Persian: محمدرضا علی‌زمانی; ca. 1972 – 28 January 2010) was an Iranian activist working for the "Iran Monarchy Committee" or Kingdom Assembly of Iran, who was sentenced to death by an Islamic Revolutionary Court, in October 2009 for moharebeh – "taking up arms against Iran's Islamic system" – and executed on 28 January 2010.

According to his indictment, Ali-Zamani joined the Kingdom Assembly of Iran "after hearing about it on a television satellite channel" and is accused of "distributing anti-regime CDs and propaganda" and "copies of The Satanic Verses", being trained in chemical weapons and providing information on Iranian officials "targeted for assassination". According to Dordaneh Fouladvand — an Assembly spokeswoman—he had worked with the organisation but had played no role in the post-election protests. According to the same source: "His job was simply to pass on news for our radio station and to make broadcast packages". In January 2010, Ali-Zamani and 20 year old Arash Rahmanipour were hanged on the same day.

His was the first case following the mass protests following the 2009 election to result in a death sentence, and human rights campaigners fear it may "pave the way for further politically driven executions" in Iran. He was one of over 100 opposition supporters who were accused of inciting street protests after the election was reported to be among the first of these detainees executed. He was reportedly denied access to a defense attorney.

Mark Fitzpatrick, from the International Institute for Strategic Studies, suggested that Ali-Zamani's harsh sentence was an effort on the part of the Iranian government to discourage future protests: "It sounds like the regime continues to feel very vulnerable and is utilizing all the powers of control at its disposal to stamp out protests," Mr. Fitzpatrick said.
