= Arash Rahmanipour =

Iranian activist

Arash Rahmanipour آرش رحمانی پور
- Born: 1990; Iran
- Died: January 28, 2010 (aged 19–20)

Arash Rahmanipour (Persian: آرش رحمانی پور; c. 1990 – January 28, 2010) was one of the two people hanged in early 2010 by the Iranian government after being convicted of waging war against God (Moharebeh) and attempting to overthrow the Islamic regime. Some government-controlled media outlets had originally alleged that one of the reasons behind Arash Rahmanipour's execution was for participation in post-election protests, trying to associate him with Iranian Green Movement, in what has been called by some analysts "an attempt to intimidate a widespread protest movement challenging the nation's hard-line establishment", despite the fact that Rahmanipour was arrested months before the 2009 presidential elections and was in jail during the post-election protests.

== Accusations and execution ==
The regime has claimed that the two were members of a political group "the Kingdom Assembly of Iran" and this membership is announced as the reason for execution. The Kingdom Assembly of Iran confirmed it had worked with Ali-Zamani, (but not Rahmanipour) and "dismissed the allegations" and insisted he had been forced to confess. The group said he had played no role in the post-election protests and had merely passed on news to its radio station.

The Islamic regime had announced nine others are sentenced to death and called them moharebeh or "enemies of God". This came along with warning of more public trials of opposition supporters. This is apparently an "attempt to intimidate a widespread protest movement challenging the nation's hard-line establishment" Los Angeles Times said. According to The Washington Post newspaper, the two men were arrested before the 2009 presidential elections and the protests over the legitimacy of the elections, but were tried in "the same mass trial" as the election protestors "in an attempt to show that the political opposition is in league with violent armed groups in a foreign-backed plot to overthrow the Islamic system."

According to officials of the regime "these two were executed in connection with Iranian protests after June election" But Rahmanipour's lawyer Nasrin Sotoudeh denies the allegation of her client had to do with current Iranian protests. Sotoudeh noted in interviews that Rahamanipour was arrested months before the 2009 election and was later imprisoned herself for giving these interviews. Sotoudeh was threatened to be detained, in her attempt to enter the courtroom where Arash Rahmanipour's trial was held, according to the Los Angeles Times. Furthermore, the lawyer described Rahmanipour's execution as a violation of Iranian law since the whole process was conducted unlawfully and privately, reported by CNN.

According to Los Angeles Times "The government has stepped up legal pressure on the opposition movement with another round of confrontations possible Feb. 11, the 31st anniversary of the founding of the Islamic Republic."

The execution took place on Thursday January 28, 2010 just before dawn. The other executed prisoner was Mohammad-Reza Ali-Zamani.

=== Family response ===
Rahmanipour's father condemned the execution of his son as unjust and stated that he only learned of the execution and his son's death from the media. He has called his son a martyr, and according to a report on English-language Al Jazeera International by reporter Dorsa Jabbari, he refused to "accept condolences over his son's death, only congratulations, as his son had died a martyr for the cause of Iranian democracy." According to Al Jazeera, Arash Rahmanipour's father held the Iranian justice system responsible for the execution of his son.
