= District 13, Isfahan =

District in Isfahan, Iran

Coordinates: 32.614695°N 51.616146°E

District 13 (منطقه 13 اصفهان) is one of the largest of Isfahan's fifteen districts.

== Facilities ==
Recreation facilities include 11 sports venues and 1 swimming pool.

Eleven pocket parks are located in the district.

It is the site of the first Iranian green energy plus structures.

It is the top district in mechanized irrigation.

== Neighborhoods ==
The ten neighborhoods are:

- Hakim Nezami حکیم نظامی,
- Amirie,
- Shafaq,
- Kuye Gulzar,
- Keshavarzi,
- Kuye Valiasr,
- Baq Ziar,
- Qaemie (قائمیه).

== Construction ==
As of 2023, 88 hectares of buildings were older structures. The district is the top construction spot in the city of Isfahan by number of permits issued.

Isfahan Municipality has created a tourism program for the district.

== Transport ==
Major transport routes include the Mofateh Bridge, Valiasr Bridge and Vahid Bridge.

== Other sites ==
- Baq ferdus garden باغ فردوس
- Zurkhane
- Taekwondo gym
- Isfahan Central Prison
- Specialized children's books library, theater salon
- Nastaran park
- Isfahan province south west terminal
- Azadegan
- Janbazan جانبازان
- Cultural centers buildings, Amirie امیریه, Niaiesh نیایش
- Andishe underpass
