= Zahra Seddiqi Hamedani =

Iranian LGBTQI+ activist

- زهرا صدیقی همدانی
- Born: 1991 (age 34–35); Naqadeh, Iran
- Known for: LGBT activism

Sareh Mansouri, often identified by her birth name Zahra Seddiqi Hamedani (Persian: زهرا صدیقی همدانی; born c. 1991), is an Iranian LGBTQI+ activist who was arrested by the Islamic Revolutionary Guard Corps on 27 October 2021 while illegally crossing into Turkey to seek asylum. After suffering maltreatment during her initial period of imprisonment, additional charges were made against her and on 4 September 2022, she was sentenced to death for 'Corruption on Earth'. The sentencing and imprisonment has been widely condemned by the international community as the charges seem to stem solely from her activism and identity. Mansouri was reported to live in Cologne, Germany in December 2023

== Life and activism ==
Details about Sareh's life are sparse, but it has been reported that she has two children, a boy and a girl age 12 and 14, and previously attended home church services in Iran. She has been photographed wearing a crucifix but it is uncertain if she identifies as a Christian or otherwise. Sareh was active on social media in support of gay rights and considered a prominent figure in Iranian LGBTI circles. In May 2021, Sareh spoke out about the mistreatment of LGBTI+ people living in Iraqi Kurdistan for a BBC Persian documentary. It is thought that this activism resulted in her later imprisonment as she was detained in Erbil, Iraq in October 2021. It seems she went to Iran soon after her release to make a move towards safety. Acting in defiance of her persecution Sareh stated:

"I want you to know how much pressure we LGBT people endure. We risk our lives for our emotions, but we will find our true selves.... I hope the day will come when we can all live in freedom in our country... I am journeying toward freedom now. I hope I'll arrive safely. If I make it, I will continue to look after LGBT people. I will be standing behind them and raising my voice. If I don't make it, I will have given my life for this cause."

This was later shared by Amnesty International and the Iranian Lesbian and Transgender Network, 6RANG.

== Imprisonment and sentencing ==
Shortly before her attempted escape into Turkey, Sareh predicted her own arrest claiming:

"I may be arrested at any moment because they have all the information about me... my life is in real danger... If I don't arrive [in Turkey], it is clear what happened."

Sareh was arrested on 27 October 2021 while attempting to cross into Turkey and held at the prison in Urmia. She was tortured repeatedly during a period of 53 days in solitary confinement following her arrest. On 16 January 2022, Sareh was charged with committing 'Corruption on Earth' via "the promotion of homosexuality," "promoting Christianity," and "collaboration with anti-Iranian media". Throughout the trial process, Tasnim News Agency released court allegations and video recordings made by detainees under duress indicating that Zahra had been involved in a human trafficking operation to bring women and girls out of Iran for exploitation by homosexual organizations abroad. Sareh was condemned to death by the courts on 5 September 2022. The verdict received extensive press coverage outside of Iran with over 60 international news outlets covering the story. Two days after learning about her sentence, Sareh tried to kill herself with an overdose of medication. She was returned to prison in "a bad mental state" after hospitalization following the suicide attempt.
