= Mohammed Bijeh =

Iranian serial killer

- Born: Quchan, Razavi Khorasan province, Iran
- Died: 16 March 2005; Pakdasht, Iran
- Cause of death: Execution by hanging
- Other name: "Vampire of the Tehran Desert"
- Conviction: Murder
- Penalty: Death

Details
- Victims: 21–29 (Note: Reports vary)
- Span of crimes: March 2004 – September 2004
- Country: Iran
- State: Pakdasht

Mohammed Bijeh (Persian: محمد بيجه; died 16 March 2005) was an Iranian serial killer. He was convicted of raping and killing around 20 children, mostly boys, and was sentenced to 100 lashes followed by execution. All the boys were between 8 and 15 years old. The murder of children around Tehran was recognized as the largest criminal case in contemporary Iranian history and provoked national outrage. Bijeh's execution, which was witnessed by over 5,000 people, including children, sparked debates on whether public executions should continue within the country.

== Crimes ==
Bijeh committed the crimes between March and September 2004. Bijeh would lure his victims into the desert and said they would hunt animals. He would proceed to kill the children, and burn or bury their bodies to dispose them. Several victims came from poor Afghan refugee families, who did not report their children missing to avoid deportation. The number of victims varies; the BBC reported he was found guilty of murdering between 19 and 22 people; however, the local population estimates the number to be higher.

== Arrest and trial ==
Bijeh was reportedly imprisoned in April 2004 after the disappearance of five boys; however, he was released on bail after no evidence of his guilt was found. According to a lawyer in Bijeh's trial, Farideh Ghairat, he was caught after two of his attempted victims escaped and reported him and an accomplice, Ali Gholampour. The three other children with the pair were sexually assaulted and murdered. Bijeh was tried in Branch 74 of the Tehran Provincial Court. The trial was held in private in respect for the victims' families. Bijeh stated that if he were not arrested, he would have killed 100 children. Bijeh claimed that the murders were committed to earn money, and he initially planned to target children of government officials; however, in fear of being caught, decided to pursue children from poor families. Bijeh confessed to the crimes and recounted them in detail. He was convicted of 21 counts of premeditated murder, corruption on earth, and sentenced to 16 counts of retribution, one count of public execution, 100 lashes, and 15 years in prison.

Gholampour was acquitted of involvement in the murders but was convicted of taking part in some of the kidnappings, which he confessed to. He was sentenced to 15 years in prison and 100 lashes. The police investigation was extensively criticized, with several officers suspended due to incompetence.

== Execution ==
On 16 March 2005, in Pakdasht, the town near the desert area where the killings occurred, in front of a crowd of about 5000, Bijeh's shirt was removed, and he was handcuffed to an iron post, where he received 100 lashings. A brother of one of the victims managed to get past security and stabbed Bijeh. The mother of one of the victims put a blue nylon rope around his neck, and he was hoisted about 10 metres in the air by a crane until he died. Several bystanders chanted "Marg bar Bijeh" (Death to Bijeh) and "Allahu akbar" (God is great).

== See also ==
- Asghar the Murderer
- List of serial killers by country
- List of serial killers by number of victims
