= Majid Kavousifar =

Iranian civilian executed for murdering a judge

- مجید کاووسی‌فر
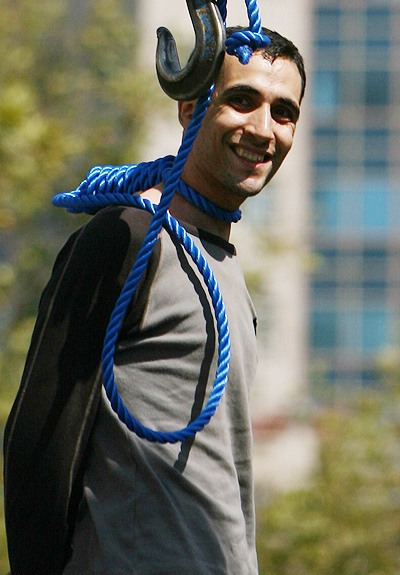
- Kavousifar moments before his execution in Tehran
- Born: 1978 or 1979
- Died: 2 August 2007 (aged 28); Tehran, Iran
- Status: Executed by hanging
- Convictions: Murder (3 counts); Armed robbery (8 counts); Illegal firearms possession Illegal drug use
- Penalty: Death

Majid Kavousifar (Persian: مجید کاووسی‌فر) was an Iranian man who, along with his nephew Hossein Kavousifar, were convicted of the murder of Judge Masoud Ahmadi Moghaddasi. Majid and Hossein Kavousifar were both publicly executed by hanging in Tehran in August 2007.

== Assassination of Masoud Ahmadi Moghaddasi ==
Masoud Ahmadi Moghaddasi was one of several judges of Iran's Islamic Revolutionary Court, that collectively sentenced more than 2,800 to 3,800 political prisoners to execution during the 1988 executions of Iranian political prisoners. The mass executions were largely thought to be a political purge with Operation Mersad preceding the executions. Moghaddasi also presided over the trials of Iranian political dissidents, such as Akbar Ganji.

As Moghaddasi was leaving a court building in Tehran on 2 August 2005, an assailant on a motorcycle shot the judge twice with a pistol, killing him. That assailant was subsequently identified as Majid Kavousifar.

== Escape from Iran, and arrest ==
After murdering Moghaddasi, Majid Kavousifar escaped from Iran to United Arab Emirates and went to the United States embassy to apply for refugee status. Instead, the embassy surrendered him to Emirati police, and the UAE extradited Kavousifar to Iran in 2006.

== Trial ==
After their arrest, Iran's Ministry of Intelligence interrogated the Kavousifars, and determined that the duo murdered Moghaddasi because of personal motivations, and not political reasons. Majid confessed to the murder after three hours of interrogation.

Majid and Hossein Kavousifar were tried before Branch 15 of the Revolutionary Court in Tehran. Majid testified in court to killing Moghaddasi, claiming his motive was because the judge had on a previous occasion wrongly convicted him of alcohol possession (a crime under Iran's version of Islamic law). During that previous trial, Moghaddasi sentenced Majid to be whipped, but subsequently reduced his punishment to a fine. This experience made Majid conclude Moghaddasi was a corrupt and unjust judge, and retaliated by killing him.

On 14 March 2007, the Revolutionary Court found Majid and Hossein Kavousifar guilty of spreading corruption on the earth, the murders of Moghaddasi and the other two, armed robbery, illegal possession of firearms, and other crimes, and sentenced them to the death penalty. In addition, the court sentenced Majid to a whipping of 74 lashes and a fine of one million tomans (a toman is equivalent to 10,000 Iranian rials) for illegal drug use.

== Execution ==
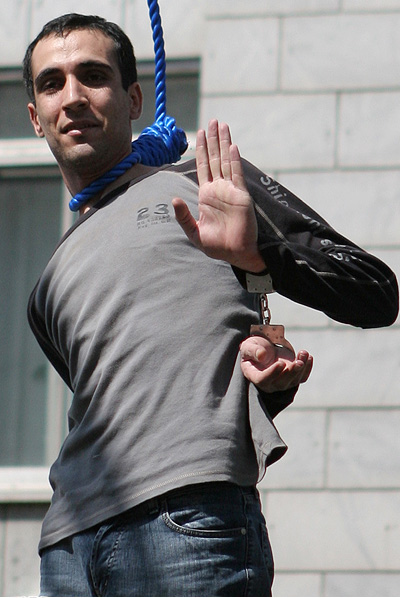
Majid Kavousifar waving to the crowd

Majid and Hossein were both hanged in public on 2 August 2007, in front of the Ershad Judiciary Complex in central Tehran. At the time, the Kavousifars' hangings were the first public executions carried out in Tehran in five years. Majid and Hossein were hanged from ropes attached to five meter long cranes; however, both men were placed on stools, which were pulled from under their feet at the moment of their execution. Majid appeared to die instantly, while Hossein struggled for a few moments before going limp. After several minutes, their bodies were removed and placed into an ambulance.

Hossein Kavousifar appeared visibly distressed as he awaited his execution, but his uncle (Majid) gestured to him and smiled in an attempt to reassure him. Majid Kavousifar showed no remorse to police officers in his last words, telling them, "I reached the point at which I decided to eradicate any injustice." Majid was described in one report as "waving one hand from his handcuffs at his co-conspirator at [sic] the watching crowds" and making "a show of puffing out his chest, grinning at the crowds and even chatting to the burly black-clad executioner, in an apparent final check of the execution procedure."

== Internet popularity ==
Photos of Majid Kavousifar's execution went viral in the late 2010s with fictional stories including "a Christian got executed in a Muslim country" or "an Algerian hacker who was executed for stealing money from Israeli banks."
