= Monarchism in Iran =

Political movement in post-revolutionary Iran

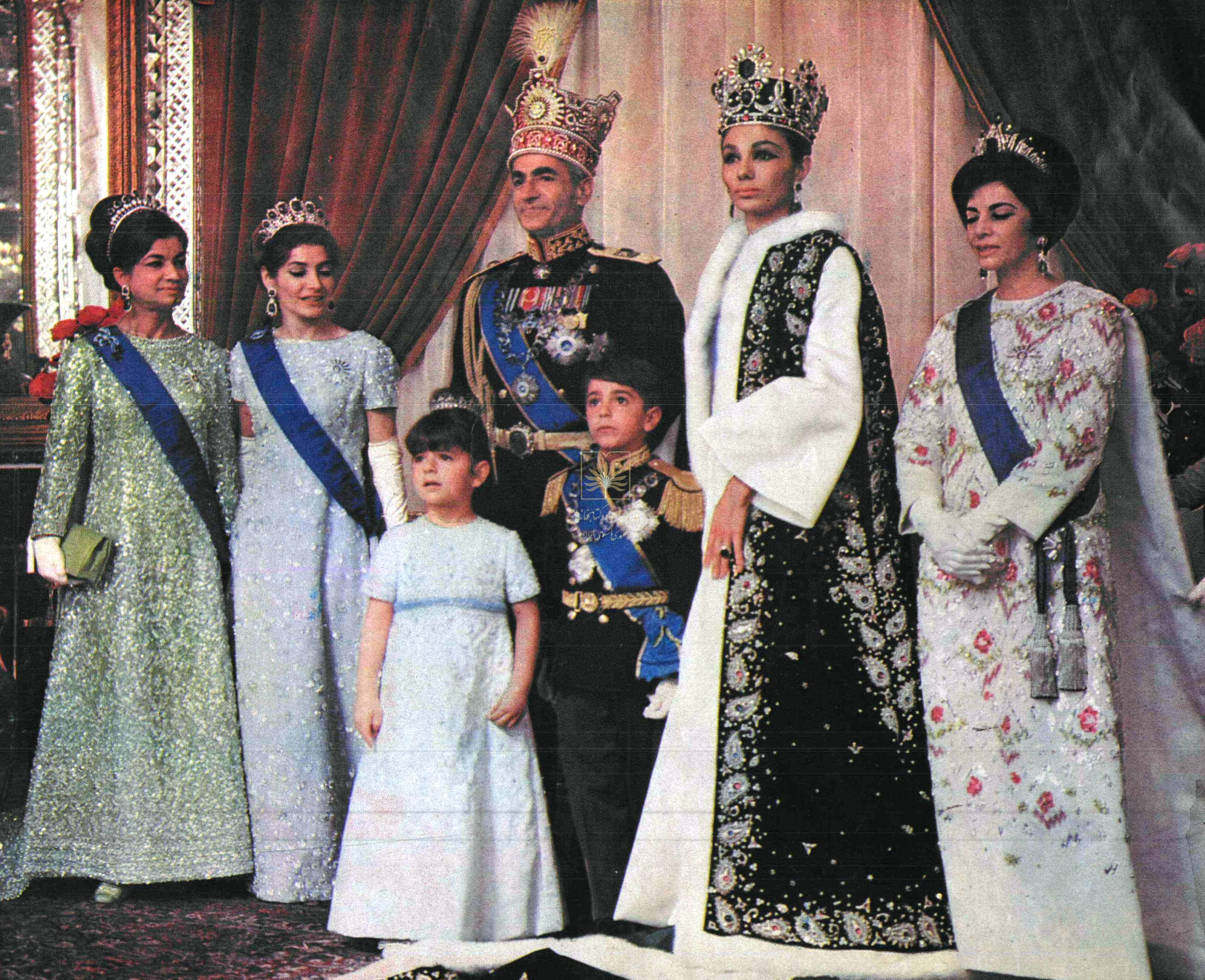
The Iranian imperial family at the coronation of Mohammad Reza Pahlavi in 1967

The flag of Iran used before the 1979 Revolution, featuring the Lion and Sun. It became widely used as a symbol of Iranian monarchism in the 2020s.

Iranian monarchism (Persian: پادشاهی‌خواهی در ایران) is the advocacy of restoring the monarchy in Iran, which was abolished during the 1979 Revolution. Iran, in its various known forms, beginning with the Median dynasty, was a monarchy (or composed of multiple smaller monarchies) from the 7th century BCE until 1979.

In the 2020s, monarchy in Iran was considered as one of the main currents opposing the Islamic Republic of Iran. According to surveys conducted by the GAMAAN Institute in 2023, the tendency towards the monarchy and acceptance of Reza Pahlavi among different sections of Iranian society, especially during the Mahsa Amini protests, had grown significantly.

== History ==
=== Before 1979 ===
It first became a constitutional monarchy in 1906 under the Qajar dynasty, but underwent a period of autocracy during the years 1925–1941 during the rule of Reza Shah, who, after staging a coup d'état that led to the founding of the Pahlavi dynasty, made himself the absolute ruler. Parliament became a rubber stamp, the press was censored and the Communist Party and trade unions banned. After Reza Shah's abdication in 1941, the Iranian National Assembly was restored to power. During the years 1941 to 1953, Iran remained a constitutional monarchy and active parliamentary democracy with Shah Mohammad Reza Pahlavi retaining extensive legal executive powers.

On March 15, 1951, the National Assembly, led by Prime Minister Hossein Ala, unanimously voted to nationalize the oil industry, which at the time was dominated by the Anglo-Iranian Oil Company (now BP). In 1953, the British MI6 and American CIA orchestrated a coup against Mohammed Mossadegh's government. Agents fueled rumors that the republican-minded Mossadegh was planning on abolishing the monarchy and declaring himself president of a new Republic of Iran, leading to a pro-monarchist backlash from the public and leading to a successful result in the coup against the prime minister.

The Shah, who had gone into exile during the coup, returned to Iran and named General Fazlollah Zahedi as the new prime minister. Many contemporary sources attribute the coup, or counter coup, entirely to the U.S. American CIA and agents of the British MI6 who are reported to have organized and paid for it. These sources point to many other coups in which the CIA was instrumental, such as that in Chile in 1973. Monarchists, however, argue that the counter-coup was in fact a popular uprising, and that the foreign intelligence agencies' undeniable involvement was peripheral. At least some historians argue the coup could not have taken place without both CIA organizing and Iranian support.

Afterwards, the era of constitutional monarchy gradually came to an end as the Shah increasingly exercised his executive powers unilaterally, thus leading towards the development of autocracy. By the early 1970s, with most political parties having been banned, Iran had effectively become a one-party state under the royalist Rastakhiz Party. National Front leaders like Karim Sanjabi and moderate traditional Islamic leaders like Mohammad Kazem Shariatmadari continued to espouse a constitutional monarchy.

Under increasing international pressure, particularly from President Jimmy Carter of the United States, the Shah pushed forward major democratic reforms in the late 1970s, designed to gradually restore the constitutional monarchy as it had originally been. However, several uprisings in 1978 and 1979 culminated in the Shah, who had been diagnosed with terminal cancer and had kept the fact secret, leaving the country with his family to seek treatment overseas. Within a few weeks the Shah's government had effectively collapsed and the Second Revolution had begun.

=== After 1979 ===
The new provisional revolutionary government officially abolished the monarchy and declared Iran to be a republic. In April 1979, the Islamic Republic of Iran was established, under the Supreme Leadership of Ruhollah Khomeini.

In the months following the Revolution, former Field Marshal of the Imperial Armed Forces Bahram Aryana organized a counter-revolution in exile. Based in Paris, France, with other military officials of the Imperial Armed Forces and Prince Shahriar Shafiq, he established Azadegan, a paramilitary resistance intended to help restore the constitutional monarchy. Fearing a growing counter-revolution, Prince Shahriar was assassinated in Paris in December 1979 by Khomeinist agents, which was a major setback for the monarchist resistance. Despite a number of successful operations which garnered international media attention in 1980 and 1981, the outbreak of war between Iran and Iraq officially brought any hope for counter-revolution to an end.

In the 1990s and the decade following 2000, the Shah's reputation has staged something of a revival, with many Iranians looking back on his era as a time when Iran was more prosperous and the government less oppressive. Journalist Afshin Molavi reports even members of the uneducated poor — traditionally core supporters of the revolution that overthrew the Shah — making remarks such as 'God bless the Shah's soul, the economy was better then;' and finds that "books about the former Shah (even censored ones) sell briskly," while "books of the Rightly Guided Path sit idle."

The Crown Prince of Iran, Reza Pahlavi, himself does not publicly advocate the restoration of his dynasty, instead stating that the matter is for Iranians themselves to decide in a national referendum whether or not to restore the constitutional monarchy and the House of Pahlavi. However, the Crown Prince publicly announced his desire for western support in collapsing the current government of Iran, even suggesting himself as an interim leader for the new regime. Additionally, reports following the publication of an email sent by former WE Believe in Israel director and current British MP Luke Akehurst reveal that British MPs and peers were invited by Akehurst to a 30 June 2025 meeting where the Crown Prince would present his plan to collapse the Islamic Republic of Iran's government in order to establish a secular regime potentially aligned with Israel.

== See also ==
- Iranian nationalism
- Iranian opposition
- Kingdom Assembly of Iran
- List of royal consorts of Iran
- Pahlavism
- Political parties in Iran
- Politics of Iran
- Republic of China nationalism
- Secularism in Iran
- White Turks
