= Kingdom Assembly of Iran =

Political party

- The emblem that is commonly used by API. It is based on Derafsh Kaviani, which is a symbol of the Sasanian Empire.
- Other name: Tondar
- Founding leader: Frood Fouladvand (MIA)
- Leader: Masmatus (POW)
- Spokesperson: Jamshid Sharmahd (executed)
- Founded: 2004
- Dates active: 2004–present
- Headquarters: United States
- Active regions: Iran
- Ideology: Iranian monarchism; Iranian nationalism; Ultranationalism; Zoroastrianism; Anti-Arab sentiment; Islamophobia

The Kingdom Assembly of Iran, (Note: Persian: انجمن پادشاهی ایران, romanized: Anjoman-e Pâdeshâhi-ye Irân (API)) also known as Tondar, (Note: Persian: تندر, lit. 'Thunder') is a decentralized Iranian monarchist militant organization, primarily known for its efforts to overthrow the Islamic Republic and restore the Iranian monarchy by violent means such as terrorism. The API were responsible for the Shiraz bombing in 2008. The group is currently banned in the Islamic Republic of Iran.

== Organization ==
The Kingdom Assembly of Iran formerly ran a satellite television service from London, named 'Your TV'. It stopped broadcasting in 2008. API then initiated radio and television broadcasts from Los Angeles named 'Radio Tondar'.

Exact membership of the API remains unknown. In 2010, the group claimed "100,000 members in the U.S.", despite experts estimating it to have a size of a few hundred worldwide.

=== Ideology and platform ===
The core ideology of the Kingdom Assembly of Iran is monarchism, which it embraces more on organic, emotional and romantic elements rather than a political reasoning. In contrast to typical monarchists who glorify the Pahlavi dynasty, the group looks back more to pre-Islamic Persian Empire as a source of inspiration.

The group is staunchly against Islam and characterizes it as "alien" and "violent". In a posting, the Kingdom Assembly of Iran blames 1,400 years of "shameful Islamic tradition" as the fundamental problem of Iran due to Gender Inequality and Oppression, Cultural Repression and Violence and Intolerance which existed in Iran ever since the Arab invasion. Tondar opposes the violent and forced destruction of Iranian culture following the Arab invasion, asserting that Iranians had a distinct cultural identity prior to this event. It argues that Iranians were indirectly pressured to convert to Islam through the imposition of the 'Jizya,' a tax paid by non-Muslims instead of Zakat, usually lower than Zakat and gave military exemption and to be ruled by their own laws. The organization draws a clear line between Arab people and between Iranian/Persian and Islamic/Arabic identity.

The group considers anyone associated with the Iranian government to be a "traitor", and does not recognize any distinguishment between the reformists and the conservatives. It considers the Green Movement of Iran to be a deception by the regime, arguing that the elected president holds no real authority, which rests entirely with the Supreme Leader, who possesses dictatorial power. Like most Iranian opposition groups, Tondar views reformists as merely a faction within the existing regime. However, Iranian authorities tried to discredit 2009 Iranian presidential election protests by linking them to groups such as the Kingdom Assembly of Iran during a series of trials.

In a 2010 interview with The Wall Street Journal, spokespersons for the group acknowledged that the group has "fighters" who seek replacing of Iran's current system with monarchy. On its Facebook page, as of May 2010 the API called for "the overthrow of the Islamic regime... by ALL MEAN[s]!!!!". In 2020 the intelligence minister of the regime accused the group of planning 27 attacks.

== Activities and alleged activities ==
=== 2005 ===
In 2005, 56 Iranians staging a sit-in against the Iranian Islamic government were arrested at the Brussels airport for refusing to leave a Lufthansa plane. At least one protester, Armin Atshgar, identified himself as a member of the group and told the press that "We want the European Union to remove the Islamic leaders from Iran." The group was also reportedly active at the annual Nowruz Persian parade in New York City.

=== 2008 ===
The Jamestown Foundation reported that the organization took responsibility for the 2008 Shiraz explosion at the Hosseynieh Seyed al-Shohada Mosque where 12 people were killed and 202 injured. Mohammad-Reza Ali-Zamani and Arash Rahmanipour, alleged by the government to be members of the assembly, were arrested and tried for the bombing by the Judiciary of the Islamic Republic of Iran. In January 2010 they were executed for moharebeh ("waging war against God") and attempting to overthrow the Iranian government. An Assembly spokesperson has denied that Ali-Zamani had played any role in the post-election protests, stating that he had worked with the organization, but his job was "simply to pass on news for our radio station and to make broadcast packages".

=== 2010 ===
In 2010, the Iranian regime accused the organization of planning terror attacks in Iran. The group runs pro-Iranian opposition radio and television stations and has called for the overthrowing of the Iranian government.

The group members have denied that the group is a terrorist organization and denied involvement with the attacks in Iran.

Iran analysts said Iran may be pointing the finger at Tondar because it prefers to "blame the internal dissent and tumult on outside forces".

=== 2020 ===
On 1 August 2020, Iran's Ministry of Intelligence announced they detained Jamshid Sharmahd, spokesperson of the assembly. Iranian state television (IRIB) broadcast a report on Sharmahd's arrest, linking him to the 2008 bombing of the Hosseynieh Seyed Al-Shohada Mosque in Shiraz. It also said his group was behind a 2010 bombing at Ruhollah Khomeini's mausoleum in Tehran that wounded several people.

== See also ==
- Monarchism in Iran
