= Malaysian legal history =

Malaysian legal history has been determined by events spanning a period of some six hundred years. Of these, three major periods were largely responsible for shaping the current Malaysian system. The first was the founding of the Malacca Sultanate at the beginning of the 15th century; second was the spread of Islam in the indigenous culture; and finally, and perhaps the most significant in modern Malaysia, was British colonial rule which brought with it constitutional government and the common law system.

== Malacca Sultanate ==
During the realm of the Sultanate, Malacca was an important trading port and the maintenance of law and order was crucial to its prosperity. The administration of justice was placed under the direct charge of the Bendahara (or chief minister) who exercised both political and judicial functions. The Temenggung (which is the commander of troops and police) was responsible for apprehending criminals, maintaining prisons and generally keeping the peace. The welfare of foreigners residing in the state was looked after by several Shahbandars (harbour masters and collectors of customs).

Little is known of the legal system in those days but it is generally accepted that the law administered then was a combination of Muslim law and the "Adat Temenggung" (patriarchal Malay customary law). The "Adat Temengung" was the law of the Sultan or the law ordained by the rulers and later adopted in the other regions of Peninsular Malaysia. It was the basis of the law as found in Malay legal digests compiled between the 15th and 19th centuries.

The formal legal text of traditional Malacca consisted of the Undang-Undang Melaka (Laws of Malacca), variously called the Hukum Kanun Melaka and Risalat Hukum Kanun, and the Undang-Undang Laut Melaka (the Maritime Laws of Malacca). The laws as written in the legal digests went through an evolutionary process. The legal rules that eventually evolved were shaped by three main influences, namely the early non-indigenous Hindu/Buddhist tradition, Islam and the indigenous "adat".

== European and British influence ==
When Malacca fell into the hands of the Portuguese from 1511 to 1641 and the Dutch from 1641 till 1786, the local people continued to practise Islamic laws and Malay customs. It could be said that the Portuguese and the Dutch laws made relatively little impact on the legal system as a whole other than the political and administrative structures.

In 1786, Britain acquired the island of Penang, the first territory in Malaysia to fall into British hands. The main preoccupation of the British administrators during the first decades after the founding of Penang, was the maintenance of some form of order and to this end, local customs and law were allowed to continue but tempered by such portions of the English law as were considered just and expedient. Some judgements meted out may seem rather strange by today's standard but it should be borne in mind that they merely reflected the harsh and often chaotic conditions of those pioneering days. Complaints and petitions were made over many years for a better system of administering justice. Finally, it came in the form of the Royal Charter of Justice of 1807. The Charter is the most significant event in Malaysian legal history as it marked the beginning of the statutory introduction of English law into this country. The Charter established the Court of Judicature of the Prince of Wales' island (as Penang was then known) to exercise jurisdiction in all civil, criminal and ecclesiastical matters. It was interpreted by the courts as introducing to Penang the law of England as it stood in 1807 insofar as it was suitable to local conditions and circumstances.

When Penang, Singapore, which was founded by the British in 1819 along with Malacca, which fell to the British as a trade-off under the Anglo-Dutch Treaty of 1824, formed the Straits Settlement in 1826, a new charter, the Charter of Justice was introduced. A new court called 'The Court of Judicature of Prince of Wales' Island, Singapore and Malacca" was created by this Charter. Penang in a sense had a second statutory reception of English law although it was the first for Singapore and Malacca. In one stroke of the pen, the Straits Settlements received a large dose of English law.

Despite the new Charter, the administration of justice was far from satisfactory. A third Charter of Justice was granted in 1855 which enabled the reorganisation of the court system. In 1867, when the administration of the Straits Settlements from India was transferred to the Colonial Office, the court system was reorganised once again. By Ordinance 5 of 1868, the Court of Judicature of Prince of Wales' Island, Singapore and Malacca was abolished. A new court known as the Supreme Court of the Straits Settlements was established. In 1873, the Supreme Court was further reorganised under four judges – the Chief Justice, the Justice of Penang, the Senior Puisne Judge and the Junior Puisne Judge. The Court of Quarter Sessions was established as a criminal court and presided over by the Senior and Junior Puisne Judges in Singapore and Penang respectively. A Court of Appeal was also constituted. By then, the judiciary had slowly evolved into its modern form.

Few of the British Indian statutes were imported in the Federated Malay States through the British Residents, including the Penal Code, the Contract Ordinance, the Criminal Procedure Code, and the Civil Procedure Code.

English commercial law was formally introduced into the Straits Settlements by Section 6 of the Civil Law Ordinance, 1878. This provision, as re-enacted in the Civil Law Act, 1956 (Revised 1972), is still applicable in Penang and Malacca.

English land law was specifically excluded by sub-section 2. The whole section of this Ordinance was incorporated into the Civil Law Ordinance of 1909 and later re-enacted as Section 5 of the Civil Law Ordinance (Chap. 42 of the 1936 Revised Edition). This was the legal situation in the Straits Settlements until its dissolution in 1946 following the formation of the Malayan Union.

The statutory introduction of English law to the Federated Malay States comprising the states of Perak, Selangor, Pahang and Negeri Sembilan occurred in 1937 with the introduction of the Civil Law Enactment, 1937. The Unfederated Malay States, consisting the states of Kedah, Perlis, Kelantan, Terengganu and Johor, became part of the Federation of Malaya in 1948 and the Civil Law (Extension) Ordinance, 1951, extended the application of the Enactment to these states.

Law of Sarawak Ordinance 1928 established as statutory authority for introduction of English law into Sarawak, later substituted with the Application of Laws Ordinance 1949 for broader application. Civil Law Ordinance 1938 established as statutory authority for introduction of English law into North Borneo, later substituted with the Application of Laws Ordinance 1951 for broader application.

Both enactments were replaced by the Civil Law Ordinance, 1956, which applied to all eleven states of the Federation. When Malaysia was established in 1963, it became necessary to harmonise the law to take effect in Sabah and Sarawak. The 1956 Ordinance was then superseded by the Civil Law Act, 1956 (revised 1972) which came into force on 1 April 1972.

== Bibliography ==
- Undang-Undang Melaka & Undang-Undang Laut. Editor Liaw Yock Fang. Kuala Lumpur: YAYASAN KARYAWAN, 2003 (ISBN 983-9510-06-1); 440 hlm.
- Liaw Yock Fang. Undang-Undang Melaka, a critical edition. Koninklijk Instituut voor Taal-, Land- en Volkenkunde, Martinus Nijhoff, The Hague, 1976.
- Undang-Undang Melaka. A Critical Edition, ed. by Liaw Yock Fang, Doctoral Thesis (Proefschrift) Leiden University, The Hague: De Nederlandsche Boek- en Steendrukkerij/ Verlagshuis S. L. Smits, 1976.
- Liaw Yock Fang, “The Undang-undang Melaka”, Melaka: The Transformation of a Malay Capital, c. 1400–1980, ed. by K. Singh Sandhu and P. Wheatley, Kuala Lumpur: Oxford University Press, 1983, vol. 1, pp. 180–94.
- Liaw Yock Fang. Naskah Undang-Undang Melaka: Suatu Tinjauan. – "Sari" N 25. Bangi: Universiti Kebangsaan Malaysia, 2007, p. 85–94.
- Winstedt, Richard O., “The Date of the Malacca Legal Codes”, Journal of the Royal Asiatic Society of Great Britain and Ireland, 1–2 (1953): 31–3.
- Winstedt, R.O. and P.E. de Josselin de Jong, “The Maritime Laws of Malacca. Edited, with an outline translation”, Journal of the Malayan Branch of the Royal Asiatic Society, 29.3 (1956).
- Ashgar Ali Ali Mohamed; Muhamad Hassan Ahmad, eds. (2023). Malaysian Legal System (3rd ed.). CLJ. ISBN 978-967-457-186-3. Wikidata Q123909383.
- Hasbollah Mat Saad (2018). A Brief History of Malaysia: Texts and Materials (2nd ed.). Pena Hijrah Resources. ISBN 978-967-5523-15-1. Wikidata Q123909819.

== See also ==
- Law of Malaysia
