= "Off the Straight Path": Illicit Sex, Law, and Community in Ottoman Aleppo =

2008 book by Elyse Semerdjian

- Author: Elyse Semerdjian
- Language: English
- Subject: Ottoman history Islamic law Gender and sexuality
- Publisher: Syracuse University Press
- Publication date: 8 December 2008
- Pages: 247
- ISBN: 978-0-8156-5155-0
- LC Class: KBP559.958.S46

"Off the Straight Path": Illicit Sex, Law, and Community in Ottoman Aleppo is a 2008 book by historian Elyse Semerdjian about the regulation and prosecution of sexual behaviour in Aleppo under the Ottoman Empire. It examines the relationship between Islamic law, customary practices, community standards and judicial proceedings concerning sexual offences.

== Content ==
The book focuses on Islamic legal concept of zina (a broad category concerning illicit sexual relations under Islamic law) and its treatment in Islamic jurisprudence (including the Quran, hadith and fatwa pronouncements), Ottoman legal sources, and the courts of Ottoman Aleppo. Semerdjian uses sharia court records to examine cases involving sexual offenses, sex work, domestic violence, and rape. She argues that judicial practice did not necessarily correspond to the punishments prescribed in Islamic jurisprudential texts, and that community standards, customary law, and local circumstances influenced the handling of cases.

Semerdjian argues that the Ottoman legal system was flexible in its treatment of sexual offenses. In particular, she identifies a disparity between the severe hudud punishments associated with zina in classical Islamic jurisprudence and the fines, expulsion, and other less severe measures recorded in the Aleppo court registers.

== Reception ==
Kecia Ali highlighted its use of court records and its examination of sexual offenses and community standards, while Dror Zeevi in the Journal of the American Oriental Society discussed its analysis of proceedings in the Aleppo Sharia courts. Peter Sluglett, Karen M. Kern and Mona L. Russell also reviewed the book in the Bulletin of the School of Oriental and African Studies, the International Journal of Middle East Studies and The Historian, respectively.

Najwa al-Qattan, writing in the Journal of Middle East Women's Studies, praised the breadth of the book's sources but criticised its organisation, editing and treatment of historical categories.

== See also ==
- Sexual and gender minorities in the Ottoman Empire
