= Islamic law (disambiguation) =

Islamic law may refer to:

- Sharia, Islamic divine law derived from the religious precepts of Islam
  - consens of Ulama (Fiqh) based on Quran and Hadith traditions.
- Qanun, Islamic dynastic law established by Islamic sovereigns, in particular the Ottoman sultans
