= Malaysia Law Reform Committee =

The Malaysia Law Reform Committee is a body that was set up in Malaysia in 2009 to consider whether the law needed reform.

== Purpose ==
The Malaysia Law Reform Committee was set up in December 2009. Its primary purpose was to re-study all the laws for their relevance and influence on the daily lives and activities of Malaysians with a view to making the necessary recommendations to the government for reform. The revision of the country's laws would be considered on such criteria as their relevance to everyday life and their discernible benefits to the public and the communities who reside and work in the country.

The Malaysia Law Reform Committee is chaired by Liew Vui Keong, the Deputy Minister of Law Parliamentary Affairs in the Prime Minister's Department. He has announced that among its first tasks will be a study of archaic business and commercial laws that impede business growth and development. This announcement followed the recommendation made by the Prime Minister Najib Razak that suggested that the MLRC make its study of the country's archaic business-related laws a top priority.

Priority will be given to the updating of commercial laws, development laws and laws relating to trade and commerce. Laws that could create problems to the business affairs of the country will undergo an appraisal for reform.

The Government is very concerned with the people's views and opinions on laws that hinder business growth, and will aim to secure the private sector’s crucial input for the MLRC’s action. Towards this end the MLRC will review and update such laws and work together with other government agencies, as well as the special task force to facilitate business (Pemudah) in carrying out the initiative. The Cabinet is of a similar view on archaic laws that involve land ownership that to date has been proven a hindrance and problematic to business.

The Prime Minister, Datuk VK Liew, said, “I will be taking up this massive task through discussions with the various government agencies that deal with these commercial laws, bringing to our attention their obsolescence. These archaic laws don’t augur well for business development.” He also said, “The MLRC will be also holding dialogues and discussions with a cross section of business communities for their collective views and suggestions for improved trading, general commerce and other business related activities.”

== Preliminary findings ==
The Malaysia Law Reform Committee has reported that the total number of principal Acts of Parliament that exist under the Laws of Malaysia Series is 703. These laws, which date back to the country's pre-independence or colonial period, have undergone some degree of review since 1968, but not for their content and relevance.
