= Law of Malaysia =

The law of Malaysia is mainly based on the common law legal system. This was a direct result of the colonisation of Malaya, Sarawak, and North Borneo by Britain between the early 19th century to the 1960s. The supreme law of the land—the Constitution of Malaysia—sets out the legal framework and rights of Malaysian citizens.

Federal laws enacted by the Parliament of Malaysia apply throughout the country. There are also state laws enacted by the State Legislative Assemblies which applies in the particular state. The constitution of Malaysia also provides for a unique dual justice system—the secular laws (criminal and civil) and sharia laws.

== History ==
Adat (customary practices and tradition) provided Malay law before colonization.

Prior to the independence in 1957, most of the laws of United Kingdom were imported and either made into local legislation or simply applied as case laws. Malaysian law is also based on other jurisdictions namely Australia and India. The criminal law in Malaysia—the Criminal Procedure Code—was based on the Indian criminal code. Similarly, the Contracts Act is based on the Indian model. Malaysian land law is based on the Australian Torrens system.

The Federal Constitution is the supreme law of the land. It provides the legal framework for the laws, legislation, courts, and other administrative aspects of the law. It also defines the government and monarch, and their powers, as well as the rights of the citizens.

== Dual justice system ==
The dual system of law is provided in Article 121(1A) of the Constitution of Malaysia. The State List also provides that Islamic law is a state law matter with the exception for the Federal Territories of Malaysia. Islamic law refers to sharia law, and in Malaysia it is known and spelled as syariah. The court is known as the Syariah Court. Looking at the Malaysian legal system as a whole, sharia law plays a relatively small role in defining the laws on the country. It only applies to Muslims. With regard to civil law, the Syariah courts have jurisdiction in personal law matters, for example marriage, inheritance, and apostasy. There are also sharia criminal laws, for example there is the Kelantan Syariah Criminal Code Enactment 1993. Their jurisdiction is however limited to imposing fines for an amount not more than RM 5000, and imprisonment to not more than 3 years. In August 2007, the then Chief Justice of Malaysia proposed to replace the current common law application in Malaysia with sharia law.

=== Complications ===
Complications have arisen with regard to the dual justice system, for example with regard to freedom of religion. Article 11 of the Constitution provides that "Every person has the right to profess and practice his religion". However, in the case of Lina Joy—a Malay who converted to Christianity—the Federal Court of Malaysia refused to allow her to change her religion indicated in her identity card (MyKad). The judges held that they had no jurisdiction on the matter—that it was a matter of the Shariah Court, as indicated in Article 121(1A) of the Constitution.

== Federal law and state law ==
The Malaysian Parliament Building.

Federal laws are made by legislators (members of Parliament and senators) sitting in the Parliament of Malaysia and applies nationwide. Federal laws are known as Acts (of Parliament). State laws are made by assemblymen sitting in the State Legislative Assembly (Dewan Undangan Negeri) and only applies in the particular state. State laws are often referred to as enactments or ordinances. Article 75 of the Constitution states that a federal law shall prevail over any inconsistent state laws, including sharia laws.

=== Sabah and Sarawak ===
After the formation of Malaysia in 1963, the Federal Constitution was amended to include special provisions applicable to the regions of Sabah and Sarawak. Some federal Acts of Parliament apply to these states differently on a number of matters, particularly on issues related to immigration, land and natural resource management. For example, in the Peninsular, the National Land Code governs most of the laws relating to land. In Sabah, the main legislation is the Sabah Land Ordinance; and in Sarawak, the Sarawak Land Code.

=== Kelantan attempts to impose strict Islamic laws ===
In 2015, the Malaysian Islamic Party (PAS) attempted to introduce hudud law in Kelantan, but was unsuccessful.

== Common law ==
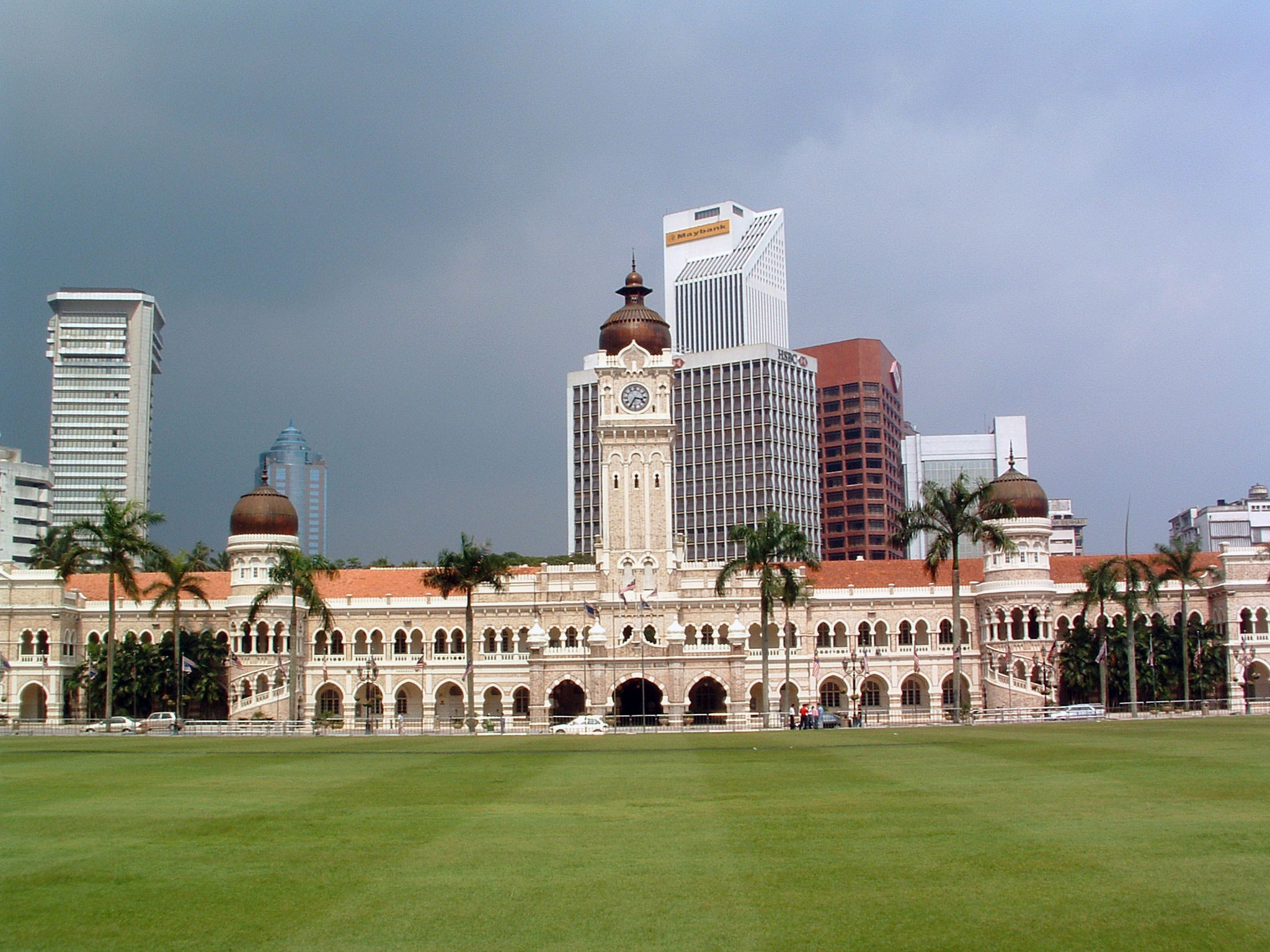
The Sultan Abdul Samad Building used to house the apex courts of Malaysia.

The laws of Malaysia can be divided into two types of laws — written law and unwritten law. Written laws are laws which have been enacted in the constitution or in legislation. Unwritten laws are laws which are not contained in any statutes and can be found in case decisions. This is known as the common law or case law. In situations where there is no law governing a particular circumstance, Malaysian case law may apply. If there is no Malaysian case law, English case law can be applied. There are instances where Australian, Indian, and Singaporean cases are used as persuasive authorities.

The application of English law or common law is specified in statutes. Section 5 of Criminal Procedure Code states that English law shall be applied in cases where no specific legislation has been enacted. Similarly, in context of civil law, Sections 3 and 5 of Civil Law Act allows for application of English common law, equity rules, and statutes in Malaysian civil cases where no specific laws have been made. In 2007, Chief Justice of Malaysia, Ahmad Fairuz Abdul Halim questioned need to resort to English common law despite Malaysia having already been independent for 50 years and proposed to replace it with Islamic law jurisprudence or sharia law. However, Malaysian Bar Council responded by saying that common law is part of Malaysian legal system and that is no basis to replace it. Court appeals to the Privy Council in the UK have been fully abolished since 1 January 1985.

The principle of stare decisis also applies in Malaysian law. This means that any decisions by a court higher in the hierarchy will be binding upon the lower courts.

== See also ==
- Courts of Malaysia
- Law enforcement in Malaysia
- Malaysian legal history
- Full text of the Constitution of Malaysia from Wikisource
