= Al-Siyasa al-Shar'iyya fi Islah al-Ra'i wa al-Ra'iyya =

- Author: Ibn Taymiyyah
- Original title: السياسة الشرعية في إصلاح الراعي والرعية
- Language: Arabic
- Publisher: Ministry of Islamic Affairs, Dawah and Guidance – Kingdom of Saudi Arabia
- Publication date: First edition, 1418 AH
- Publication place: Damascus
- Media type: Print (hardcover)
- Pages: 136

Al-Siyasa al-Shar'iyya fi Islah al-Ra'i wa al-Ra'iyya (meaning: The politics or policy of the Shariah (Islam) in purifying the ruler and the ruled) is a book written by Ibn Taymiyyah which he wrote about political aspects of Islam in the form of a letter to a guardian of Islamic authority. It covered what a Muslim ruler should do in fulfilling his trust and ruling among the people justly within the limits of Islamic law. It included explanation of just politics and the righteous guardianship of the ruler was given as Allah sees it from every ruler.

Kadızade Mehmed translated the book into Ottoman Turkish with additions and comments, called it "The Crown of Letters and the Path of Ways", and presented it to Murad IV.

== Volumes and chapters ==
The book is written in two volumes:

- Book 1: Penalties Concerning the Violation of Rights due to Allah

Chapters:

  - Nature of a Limit (Set by Allah) and of a Right (Huquq) (due to Him)
  - Punishment of Muharibin and Highwaymen
  - The Duty of the Muslims if the Ruler Pursued the "Warriors Against Allah" and the Highwaymen but they Evaded his Pursuit
  - Penalties on Theft
  - Penalties Concerning Adultery
  - Penalties on Drinking and Defaming
  - Forms of Disobedience not Provided for in the Legal Penalties, and the Legal Flogging (Concerning Them)
  - Jihad and Decisive Fight
- Book 2: Penalties and Rights Belonging to a Certain Human Being (Private Law)

Chapters:

  - The Souls (Retaliation)
  - Wounds
  - Dishonouring Others
  - Forging Lies
  - Matrimony
  - Transactions
  - Counsel
  - The Necessity for Authority
