= Hukum Kanun Pahang =

Hukum Kanun Pahang (Malay for 'Pahang Laws', Jawi: حكوم قانون ڤهڠ), also known as Kanun Pahang or Undang-Undang Pahang was the Qanun or legal code of the old Pahang Sultanate. It contains significant provisions that reaffirmed the primacy of Malay adat, while at the same time accommodating and assimilating the Islamic law. The legal code was largely modelled on the Undang-Undang Melaka and Undang-Undang Laut Melaka, and was compiled during the reign of the 12th Sultan of Pahang, Abdul Ghafur Muhiuddin Shah. It is regarded as one of the oldest digest of laws compiled in the Malay world.

Historically, the Pahang Laws were adopted in Johor, following the union between Pahang and Johor in 1623, and had also significant influence in the promulgation of Perak and Brunei Laws. In 2012, the Hukum Kanun Pahang was included in the Nation Heritage List of Malaysia, under tangible heritage object category.

== History ==
The adoption of various aspects of Melakan system of administration originated from the mid 15th century, when the Old Pahang Kingdom was conquered and brought into the realm of Melaka. Early rulers of the later Pahang Sultanate, which was established as a vassal to Melaka, promulgated court traditions based on the Melakan system as enshrined in both Undang-Undang Melaka and Undang-Undang Laut Melaka, and enforced the existing adat and religious rules to maintain social order. All rules, prohibitions and customs that have been codified as laws, were in turn collected through oral traditions and memorized by senior ministers.

Between 1592 and 1614, under the order of the 12th Sultan of Pahang, Abdul Ghafur Muhiuddin Shah, the laws were improved with the details and most importantly, were recorded. The legal text would contains detailed provisions on ceremonial matters, settlement of social conflicts, maritime matters, Islamic laws and general matters. The original 44-clauses of Undang-Undang Melaka were expanded into the 93 clauses of the Pahang laws.

Shortly after the death of Abdul Ghafur Muhiuddin Shah, Pahang descended into chaos after suffering devastating attacks from Aceh. The installation of a relative, Raja Bujang, to the Pahang throne, and few years later in 1623, to the Johor throne, had united both states under a single administration. Pahang Laws were part of the elements that were integrated into the new administration. It was mentioned in the surviving text of Hukum Kanun Pahang, that the laws were also enforced in Johor.

The Pahang Laws had also significant influence in the promulgation of Hukum Kanun Brunei ('Brunei Laws') and Undang-Undang 99 ('the 99 Perak Laws'). Although both Perak and Brunei were never subjugated by Pahang, this was made possible as both states enjoyed strong diplomatic, trade and even marriage relations with the rulers of Pahang. Sultan Abdul Ghafur himself was married to a daughter of Saiful Rijal of Brunei, and he betrothed his eldest son to a grand daughter of the Sultan of Perak.

== Content ==
Similar to the Melakan Laws, the Pahang Laws was an evolving legal code and heavily influenced by both Malay Adat and Sharia law. In general, Islamic influence is dominant throughout the text, although the adat law is also prevalent in certain clauses related to commercial, family and marriage laws. In the early chapters of the text, extending from clause 1 to clause 23, are evidences of pre-Islamic influences. The legal code was further expanded to clause 66 as a result of Islamic influence. It was again further expanded up to clause 93 after receiving Melakan influences through Undang-Undang Melaka and Undang-Undang Laut Melaka. The 93 clauses of the legal code are neither systematically arranged nor classified, but can be categorised as follows;

- Criminal law

Includes punishments for criminal offences like murder, theft, robbery, and trespassing. Method of punishments includes qisas and fines. Other criminal offences mentioned are adultery, rape, sodomy. gambling, bribery and many others. All these provisions are found in the following clauses: 4, 5, 6, 7, 8, 22, 46, 47, 48, 50, 51, 52, 53, 54, 55, 56, 57, 58, 59, 63, 70, 72, 74, 79, 84, 86, 90, 92, and 93.

- Commercial law

Includes rules of commerce, lease, secured loan, loan, wage and so on. It also contains the first codified laws pertaining to waqf in the Malay world. All these provisions are found in the following clauses: 2, 3, 9, 11, 12, 14, 16, 17, 18, 24, 25, 26, 27, 28, 29, 30, 31, 32, 33, 34, 35, 36, 37, 38, 39, 41, 42, 43, 44, 62, 77, 81, 85, 87, and 88.

- Family and marriage laws

Provisions for family and marriage laws are found in clause 67 of Hukum Kanun Pahang which regarded as directly copied from 3 clauses (25, 26, 27) of Undang-Undang Melaka.

- Matters related to general religious offense and ibadah

Includes punishments for offences like apostasy and omitting salah, and the rules on jihad, witnesses and oaths. Such provisions are found in clauses 60, 61, 62, 64, and 65.

- Adat law and constitution

Outlines the roles and special positions of the Sultan and his ministers. Provisions for adat law and constitution can be found in the following clauses; 1, 12, 20, 21, 23, 56, 57, 75, 76, 82, 83, 89, and 91.

The most important part of the legal code, described as 'part one', states that the code was composed during the reign of Sultan Abdul Ghafur and applies not only to Pahang but also to Perak and Johor. A preface then states that the king should look after his subjects and appoints the leaders of the state, including the mangkubumi ('regent'), penghulu bendahari ('the treasurer'), temenggung ('leader of the army and the police'), hulubalang ('generals'), shahbandar ('harbour master'), and menteri ('ministers'). The duties of these officials are described, one by one.

== See also ==
- Undang-Undang Laut Melaka
- Undang-Undang Melaka

== Bibliography ==
- Abd. Jalil Borham (2002), Pengantar Perundangan Islam (An Introduction to Islamic Legislature), Johor Bahru: Universiti Teknologi Malaysia press, ISBN 983-52-0276-1
- Liaw, Yock Fang (2013), A History of Classical Malay Literature, Institute of Southeast Asian Studies, ISBN 978-981-4459-88-4
- Mohammad bin Pengiran Haji Abd. Rahman (2001), Islam di Brunei Darussalam, Dewan Bahasa dan Pustaka Brunei, ISBN 978-999-1701-81-3
- Siti Mashitoh Mahamood (2006), Waqf in Malaysia: Legal and Administrative Perspectives, University of Malaya press, ISBN 983-100-287-3
- Zaini Nasohah (2004), Pentadbiran undang-undang Islam di Malaysia : sebelum dan menjelang merdeka, Utusan Publications, ISBN 978-967-6115-19-5
