= Siyasa =

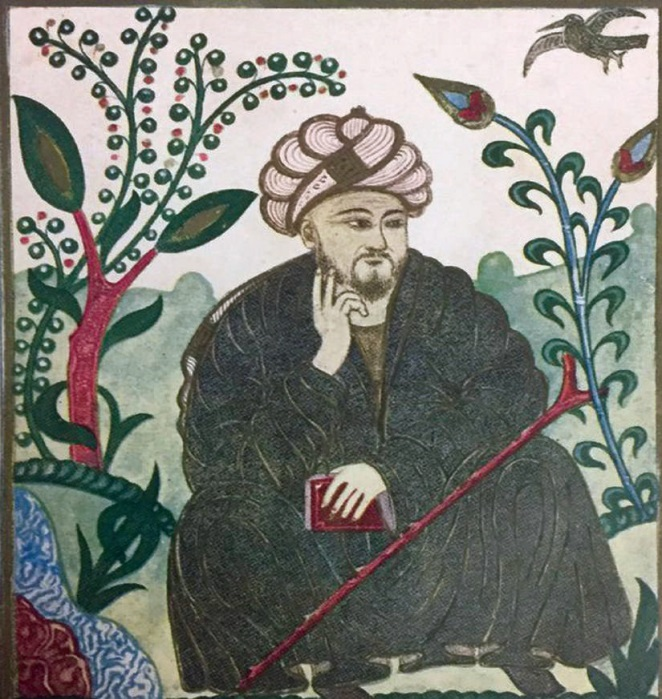
Depiction of al-Farabi, Islamic philosopher and political theorist

Siyasa (Arabic: سياسة, romanized: siyāsa) is an Arabic term associated with political authority. In pre-modern Islamic literature it was used to refer to statecraft and management of the affairs of the state. This usage has given rise to the sense of "politics" that the word has in modern Arabic. In classical Islamic works of Greek-influenced political theory, such as al-Farabi's al-Siyasa al-Madaniyya, the term refers to a branch of philosophy that studies the art of managing a polity. In Sunni Islamic jurisprudence (fiqh), the term appears in the phrase siyasa shar'iyya, which literally means governance according to sharia.

The phrase refers to the doctrine, sometimes called the political dimension of Islamic law, which was elaborated in the late medieval period in an attempt to harmonize Islamic law with the practical demands of statecraft. The doctrine emphasized the religious purpose of political authority and advocated non-formalist application of Islamic law if required by expedience and utilitarian considerations. It first emerged in response to the difficulties raised by the strict procedural requirements of Islamic law, which rejected circumstantial evidence and insisted on witness testimony, making criminal convictions difficult to obtain in courts presided over by qadis (sharia judges).

In response, Islamic jurists permitted greater procedural latitude in limited circumstances, such as adjudicating grievances against state officials in the mazalim courts administered by the ruler's council and application of "corrective" discretionary punishments for petty offenses. However, under the Mamluk Sultanate, non-qadi courts expanded their jurisdiction to commercial and family law, running in parallel with sharia courts and dispensing with some formalities prescribed by fiqh. Further developments of the doctrine attempted to resolve this tension between statecraft and jurisprudence. In later times it has been employed to justify legal changes made by the state in view of public interest, as long as they are not contrary to sharia. It was invoked by Ottoman rulers to promulgate a body of administrative, criminal, and economic laws known as qanun.

== See also ==
- Procedural law – Sum of the legal norms in court procedures
- Political aspects of Islam
- Maslaha
- Al-Siyasa al-Shar'iyya fi Islah al-Ra'i wa al-Ra'iyya
