= Qanun (law) =

Arabic word; refers to Islamic laws

Qanun or Kanun is an Arabic term (Note: Arabic: قانون, romanized: qānūn; Ottoman Turkish: قانون, romanized: kānūn, derived from Ancient Greek: κανών, romanized: kanōn, which is also the root for the modern English word "canon") that refers to laws established by Muslim sovereigns, especially the body of administrative, economic and criminal law promulgated by Ottoman sultans. It is used to contrast with sharia, the body of law elaborated by Muslim jurists. It is thus frequently translated as "dynastic law," and in Ottoman contexts as "sultanic law."

== History ==
The idea of qanun entered the Muslim world in the thirteenth century, borrowed from the Mongol Empire following their invasions. The 10th sultan of the Ottoman Empire, Suleiman, was known in the Ottoman Empire as Suleiman Kanuni ("the Lawgiver"), due to the laws he promulgated.

After the fall of the Abbasid Caliphate in 1258, a practice known to the Turks and Mongols transformed itself into Qanun, which gave power to caliphs, governors, and sultans alike to "make their own regulations for activities not addressed by sharia". This became increasingly important as the Middle East modernized, addressing problems of a modern state, which were not covered by sharia. The Qanun began to unfold as early as Umar I (586–644 CE). Many of the regulations covered by Qanun were based on financial matters or tax systems adapted through the law and regulations of territories Islam had conquered.

Kanun took on significant importance during the period of modernization in the Ottoman Empire. Kanun and sharia did not contradict each other concerning administrative matters and so kanun was assimilated easily into Ottoman regulatory functions. Kanun promulgated by Ottoman sultans was used for financial and penal law. Under Sultan Mehmed II (1451–1481), the kanun continued to be strictly applied for those practices. However, the influence of Abu ʾl-Suʿūd, the grand mufti of Istanbul from 1545 to 1574, kanun was expanded to deal with matters concerning property rights. Previously, property rights had been exclusively under the jurisdiction of sharia. Despite that seeming contradiction, skillful bureaucrats allowed kanun and sharia to coexist harmoniously. The kanun retained its relevance in the Middle East regarding civil, commercial, administrative and penal laws. It influences the ways that sharia is reproduced.

== Etymology ==
The term ḳānūn derives itself from the Greek word κανών. Originally having the less abstract meaning of "any straight rod," it later referred to any "measure or rule" in Greek. It was derived in turn from the Akkadian word Qanûm 𒂵𒉡𒌑𒌝. The word was then translated into and adopted by Arabic after the Ottoman Empire's conquest of Egypt under Sultan Selim I (ca. 1516). In the Ottoman Empire, the term still carried the word's original meanings of a system of tax regulation. However, it later came to also refer to "code of regulations" or "state law," a well-defined secular distinction to "Muslim law," known as sharia.

== See also ==
- Ottoman law
- Palestinian law
- Qanun Aceh
- Qanun of Malaysia:
  - Hukum Kanun Pahang, an attempt to codify the law in the Pahang Sultanate
  - Undang-Undang Melaka, the legal code of the Malacca Sultanate
    - Undang-Undang Laut Melaka, the section of the Malaccan legal code which dealt specifically with maritime law
