= Elyse Semerdjian =

American Historian

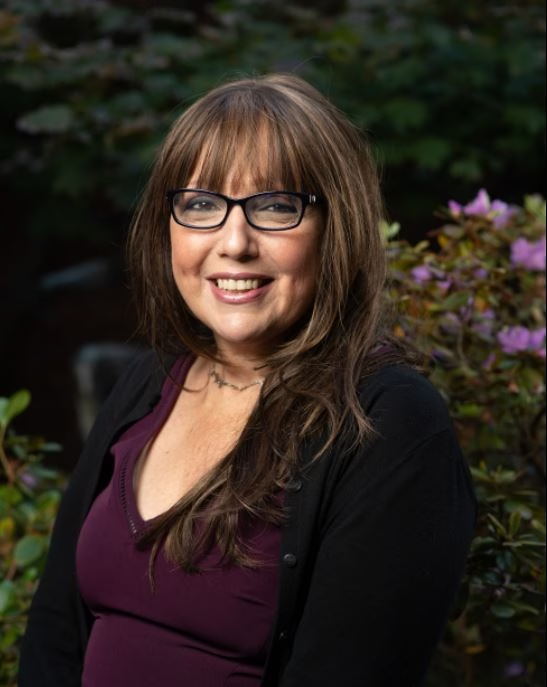
- Born: 1970 (age 55–56); Detroit, Michigan, U.S.
- Education: Georgetown University (Ph.D.) University of Michigan (M.A.) Albion College (B.A.)
- Occupation: Historian
- Title: Robert Aram and Marianne Kaloosdian and Stephen and Marian Mugar Chair of Armenian Genocide Studies
- Term: March 2024-Present
- Predecessor: Taner Akçam
- Website: elysesemerdjian.com

Elyse Semerdjian is an American historian specializing in the social history of the Ottoman Empire, particularly gender, sexuality, and Armenian history.

She holds the Robert Aram and Marianne Kaloosdian and Stephen and Marian Mugar Chair of Armenian Genocide Studies at the Strassler Center for Holocaust and Genocide Studies at Clark University in Worcester, Massachusetts, where she also teaches in the History Department.

Semerdjian earned a bachelor's degree before completing an M.A. in Middle Eastern studies at the University of Michigan and a Ph.D. in history at Georgetown University in 2003. She previously served as professor of Islamic World/Middle Eastern History and chair of the History Department at Whitman College in Walla Walla, Washington, and has held visiting positions including the Dumanian Visiting Professorship in Armenian Studies at the University of Chicago. She is the author of "Off the Straight Path": Illicit Sex, Law, and Community in Ottoman Aleppo (2008) and Remnants: Embodied Archives of the Armenian Genocide (2023), the latter of which won the 2025 Lemkin Book Award from the Institute for the Study of Genocide and the 2024 best book prize from the Association for Middle East Women's Studies.
