= Prostitution in the Ottoman Empire =

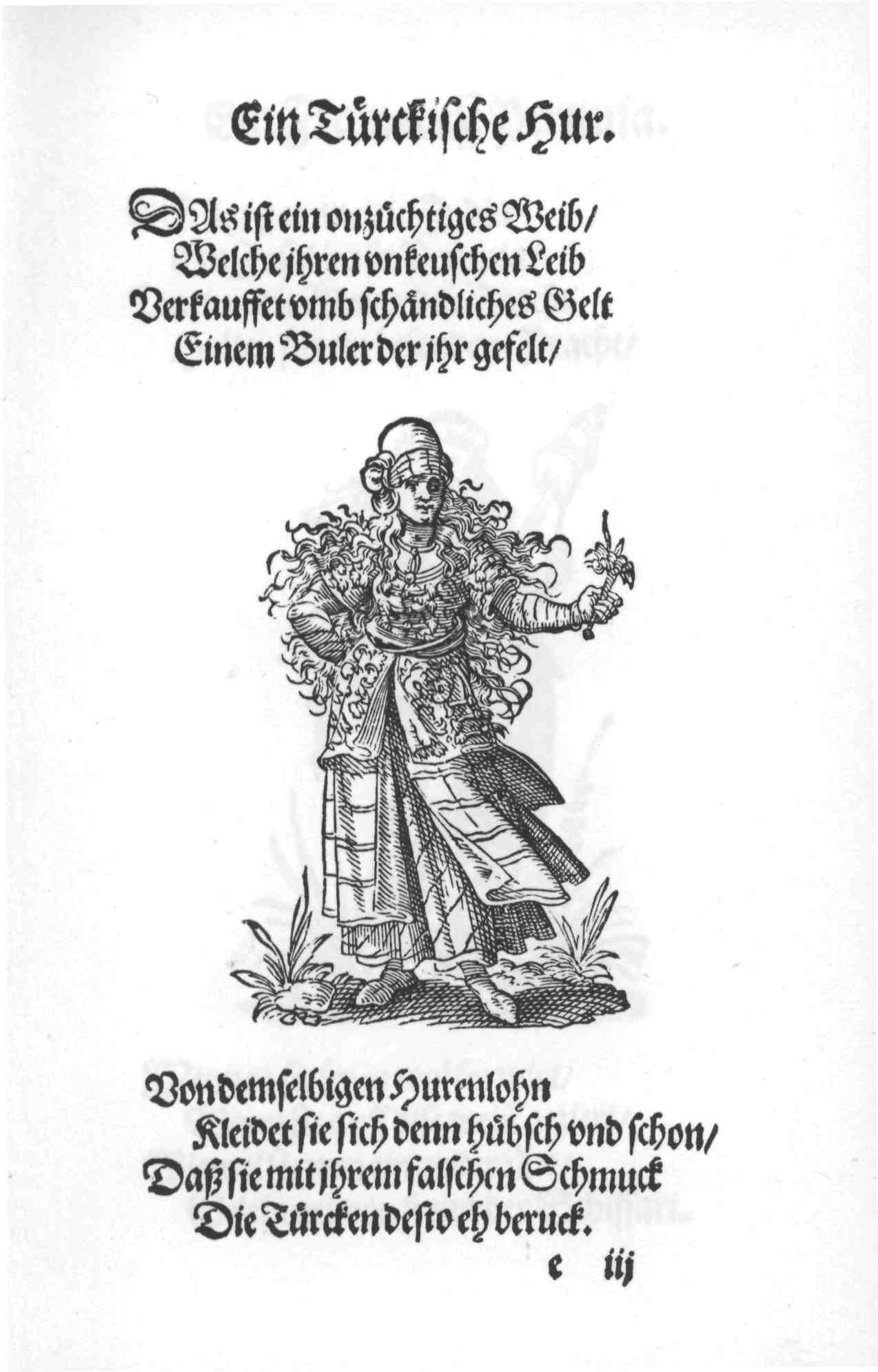
A Turkish Prostitute – a woodcut by Jost Amman with text by Conrad Lautenbach from a women's fashion book printed by Sigmund Feyrabend in Frankfurt am Main in 1586

Prostitution was prevalent in the Ottoman Empire, with both men and women, as well as Christians, Jews, and Muslims engaging in the practice. Clients met prostitutes in a variety of locations, including coffeehouses, inns for bachelors ("bachelor rooms"), laundries, restaurants, barbershops, and candy stores.

Prostitutes often served sailors and military members, particularly in their lodgings; additionally, prostitutes served clients in private homes, abandoned buildings, and taverns. In early modern Istanbul, evidence suggests that some women worked alone to find clients in public areas at night, while others worked together to bring clients to rooms they rented. To avoid attracting attention, some female prostitutes disguised themselves as men, and certain pimps married their prostitutes to remain inconspicuous. Many people who engaged in prostitution did so out of economic necessity and were primarily those left without a support system due to divorce, widowhood, or economic downturns.

Legally, the Ottoman Empire had a complicated relationship with prostitution. While Islamic law prescribes harsh punishments for crimes of illicit sex, most prostitutes did not face capital punishment. Instead, prostitutes were typically banished from their neighborhood or city or forced to pay a fine.

Scholars attribute this gap between legal theory and practice to the difficulty of proving sexual misconduct, the incentives faced by the state to permit prostitution, and the ambiguity embedded in legal theory on prostitution, given its legal equivalence to the broader category of zinā (fornication). Slaves, however, were often sexually exploited by their owners. Though Quran 24:33 prohibits slave owners from pimping their slaves, a pimp selling his slave to a new owner for sexual use and then having the ownership of her returned to him after intercourse, was seen as a loophole and not defined as prostitution.

== Legal treatment of prostitution ==
=== Legal classification and punishment ===
Under Islamic law, the crime of prostitution is considered an act of zinā, which encompasses sexual relations outside marriage or concubinage. As an offense included in the hudud, or Qur'anic punishments, zinā is one of the most severe offenses in Islam, alongside drinking alcohol and theft. Thus, Islamic law prescribes harsh fixed penalties for zinā: 100 lashes for a slave, non-Muslim, or unmarried offender and stoning to death if the offender is free, Muslim, and married. The application of these severe penalties required extraordinarily rigorous proof, namely, the testimony of four male Muslim witnesses of high moral standing who had to directly witness the act of penetration. As a result, it was "almost impossible to attain" evidence of illicit sex in most circumstances. Compounding this difficulty, witnesses were disincentivized from testifying because they could be accused of qadhf (sexual slander) if the prosecution of zinā was unsuccessful. If found to have made a false accusation of zinā, the offender would be punished with a fixed penalty of 80 lashes.

Despite the harsh penalties prescribed by Islamic law, Ottoman courts rarely enforced hudud fully, including the crime of zinā. In fact, prostitution was explicitly excluded by 16th to 18th century Ottoman jurists from the hudud penalties, although the act was not deemed legal. While the theoretical law called for severe corporal punishment and even death for offenders of sexual law, there is only one known case of stoning in the Ottoman Empire. The most common punishment for prostitutes was banishment from one's neighborhood or city. In legal records from Ottoman Aleppo, no prostitutes suffered physical punishments, only facing "banishment from the quarter", after which they could move to another quarter and continue to engage in prostitution. Punishments were slightly more serious in Istanbul, where prostitutes were banished to another area of the state and consequently alienated from their community.

There were certain instances in which legal consequences for prostitution were more severe than banishment, however. During the holy month of Ramadan, prostitutes were forbidden to be in public, and they were gathered and imprisoned to "protect the moral decency of society". Additionally, prostitutes occasionally faced forms of public humiliation and corporeal punishment, such as pillorying. These punishments were typically inflicted by high officials who were particularly stringent about sexual crimes, of which Sultan Mehmed II is an example.

=== Slavery and prostitution ===
However, the situation was different in the case of slavery. During the era of slavery in the Ottoman Empire, prostitution was connected to slavery. Islamic Law formally prohibited prostitution as zina. However, since the legal principle of concubinage in Islam allowed a man to have intercourse with his female slave without it being defined as zina, prostitution was practiced by a pimp selling his female slave on the slave market to a client, who was allowed to have intercourse with her as her new owner, and who after intercourse returned his ownership of her to her pimp on the pretext of discontent, which was a legal and accepted method for prostitution in the Islamic world. The prostitution of female slaves was formally prohibited as a result of the issuing of a new code of law, the Kanunname of 1889.

=== Legal theory vs. legal practice ===
One challenge facing researchers on this subject is the ambiguity present in Ottoman legal records concerning prostitution. In Islamic law, zinā occurs when a woman has sexual contact with any man except for her husband or master, which includes prostitution. The conflation of the broad category of zinā with prostitution suggests that a woman who has contact with a man outside of her family is considered a prostitute. As a result, it is difficult for scholars to determine whether archival material related to women's sexual behavior pertains to prostitution, adultery, or "moral looseness". Ottoman court documents also utilize euphemistic language to describe sexual offenses, employing vague terms accusing men and women of being "'harmful to neighbors (yu'thi al-jiran)', committing 'acts of indecency (af 'al shani'a)', or 'morally repugnant deeds (af'al qabiha).'" These descriptions give little information about the specific crimes of which the defendants are accused, but they appear to be crimes under the category of zinā. Scholar Abdul-Karim Rafeq proposes that such euphemisms were used to protect the privacy of families and neighborhoods who did not want the details of these crimes to be made public. Offering a different perspective, Elyse Semerdjian suggests that vague descriptions allowed accusers to avoid the extremely difficult requirements of proving zinā, instead seeking punishment at the judge's discretion.

Scholars of Ottoman prostitution provide a variety of explanations of why the treatment of prostitution differed so greatly from Islamic legal theory. Firstly, the legal resemblance between prostitution and concubinage complicated the application of zinā. The dynamic between a client and a prostitute was similar to that of a husband and wife or a master and slave since it also involved an exchange of money for sexual services. In legal records, Ottoman jurists were conflicted over this dynamic; some argued "that by paying for the services rendered, the client assumed temporary quasi-ownership of the prostitute, making the relationship akin to concubinage". This similarity introduced legal ambiguities regarding the encounters between clients and prostitutes, preventing the application of fixed penalties for zinā.

Other arguments highlight the social necessities and benefits of prostitution from the perspective of the Ottoman state. As Marinos Sariyannis explains, Ottoman law treated prostitution as "unavoidable, though immoral". Accordingly, prostitution in Ottoman Aleppo was seen as inevitable due to the demands of soldiers for prostitutes and the city's persistent military presence. Eradicating prostitution entirely was not feasible, as doing so could lead to increased risks from soldiers and possibly from unruly single men living in the area. Consequently, the government permitted the discreet operation of prostitution within designated entertainment districts like Galata and Pera. The government may also have directly benefited from this practice and deliberately allowed it to continue. According to Ö. L. Barkan, the state sought to collect "taxable income" from prostitution in the form of adultery fines, thus providing a source of revenue—albeit at the cost of "public morality". Historical records indicate that local governors had the power to tax or outlaw the practice of prostitution within their cities. In 18th-century Damascus, for instance, the governor abandoned unsuccessful attempts to curb prostitution and simply instituted a monthly fee from each prostitute to generate income.

To explain the disparity between the legal treatment of prostitution in theory and in practice, scholar James Baldwin points to how court cases originated. Ottoman sharīʿa courts did not proactively prosecute zinā cases, given their immense burden of proof; instead, subjects were the primary instigators of prostitution cases. Most commonly, residents brought cases against prostitutes and pimps in their communities in order to "clean up their neighborhood, not to exact vengeance or to set an example through punishment". Further, the nearly impossible onus of proof and the penalties for making a false accusation dissuaded subjects from explicitly accusing others of zinā, leading them instead to offer vague evidence sufficient to warrant banishment. Through this explanation, Baldwin argues that Ottoman courts did not simply stray from Islamic jurisprudence but had a nuanced response to prostitution shaped by the initiative of private litigants.

== History of prostitution ==
The sixteenth century saw strict punishments for those who engaged in prostitution. The earliest known edict relating to prostitution in the Ottoman Empire was issued in 1567, which stated that prostitutes were to be identified and imprisoned. A second amendment shortly after allowed men to marry prostitutes under the condition that the couple immediately leave Istanbul. In 1577, the sultan ordered all "whores" and women without husbands expelled from the empire. Prostitutes were forbidden from following the army during campaigns and were temporarily imprisoned whenever the army visited Istanbul. In 1596, five women caught with cavalry soldiers were executed, and the soldiers were imprisoned.

In the 17th century, during a period of Ottoman "decline and social unrest because of the weakening of authority", the state enacted further measures to combat illicit sexual activity. Sultan Suleiman's kanunname (law code) imposed harsher consequences for adulterers. In 1652, the governor of Sofia, the capital of Rumeli, or the modern-day Balkans, publicly hanged several prostitutes as a warning and expelled all others. In 1657, prostitutes in Tulca, Izmail, and Kiliya, in modern-day Ukraine, were detained and left naked on an island to die of mosquito-borne disease.

Prostitution became more acceptable in the Ottoman Empire in the 1800s through pornographic literature and depictions and was even part of public festivals. The number of court trials on prostitution in Damascus increased, implying a spread of prostitution throughout the empire. This spread may have been aided by the easing of punishment for prostitution. Instead of execution, authorities favored temporary imprisonment and expulsion from the area to deal with prostitution. Some governors also preferred to control prostitution by levying taxes, rather than through bans. In 1749, the governor of Damascus refused to punish local prostitutes in accordance with sharīʿa law, which would have meant execution. In 1778, the law stated prostitutes were to be imprisoned until they promised to quit, although some imams ignored this ruling. While in Istanbul, sailors in the Ottoman Navy often stayed in places called "bachelor's rooms" which was where most prostitution took place. Brothels also began to emerge in this time. In 1789, the sultan ordered all prostitutes imprisoned when navy forces were in the city, but that had little effect. Eventually, the government demolished the bachelor's rooms in 1811 to deal with the problem.

In the late 1800s, the Ottoman Empire decided to regulate prostitution instead of attempting to ban it. Punishments weakened and the 1852 Penal Code, 1858 Criminal Code, and 1885 Regulation of Brothels limited imprisonment to a year and fines. During the Crimean War, prostitutes were taxed, and brothels were required to undergo medical and sanitary inspections, in part to limit the spread of syphilis. Brothels needed to register the people who worked in them, with the register including name, pseudonym, age, nationality, and address. Prostitutes would receive an identification card with a photograph and proof of weekly medical examinations.

During World War I, 774 Muslim women were registered as prostitutes in Istanbul, although sociologist Clarence Richard Johnson, working at the time, estimated there were between 4,000 and 4,500 prostitutes and 159 brothels in the city. In 1915, 151 people accused of bringing prostitutes into the city, including those of Russian, Argentinian, Romanian, American, Austrian, French, British, and Greek citizenship, were banished in an attempt to limit the problem. According to researcher Stefan Hock, "deportation was the preferred method of addressing sex work during World War I. The policy had an established precedent in the long history of Islamic jurisprudence, and it fulfilled the strategic needs of a twentieth-century military". Ottoman authorities also launched an initiative to provide the increasing number of Muslim women involved in Prostitution with employment. However, these initiatives were more geared towards keeping Muslim women out of prostitution, rather than helping the ones who had already "fallen".

== Religion, ethnicity, and class ==
=== Religion ===
It was illegal for Muslim women to marry or engage sexually with non-Muslim men, while Muslim men could marry non-Muslim women. However, many Muslim women engaged in prostitution, mainly working in their homes and public spaces rather than in brothels. Female prostitutes generally attempted to limit their sexual interactions to "confessional lines" since cases were more likely to be brought to court when religious boundaries were crossed.

Until 1914, Muslim women could not be registered as prostitutes, despite likely constituting the majority of prostitutes at the time. Christian and Jewish women would sometimes wear a veil to pose as Muslim to fetch a higher price, since the restrictions on Muslim women made them more taboo and desirable. Most authorities ignored Christian and Jewish women who engaged in prostitution.

=== Ethnicity ===
In 1530, Romani ("gypsy") women in Istanbul, Edirne, Filibe, and Sofia were required to pay a 100 asper fee monthly if they undertook "activities contrary to the sharīʿa". Romani women who were repeatedly caught engaging in illicit behavior were to be registered and could be detained and punished.

In 1874, a Bulgarian newspaper, The Levant Times, claimed the lower class of the town Stara Zagora was forced into prostitution due to poverty. It claimed "the poor girls had no choice but to work at farms (çiftlik) and gardens where they had been forcibly assaulted by 'bad guys.'" Women in this situation were often detained and expelled from their homelands. In many cases, prostitutes of Ottoman citizenship were imprisoned and restricted in economic movement, while non-Ottomans were expelled from the empire outright.

In the 1800s, European prostitutes traveled to the Ottoman Empire for better economic opportunities, increasing the number of sex workers. The 1917 Russian Revolution increased the number of Russian prostitutes, with 169 registered in 1921. They reported unemployment and famine as reasons for prostitution.

During the Armenian genocide, many Armenian women who lacked any other way to support themselves were forced into prostitution. This created a severe social stigma, as many women were forced to service the Turkish men who had perpetrated the genocide. Many Kurdish women also turned to prostitution out of necessity at this time.

=== Class ===
Women, especially freed slaves, immigrants, widows, or divorcees, lacked social support systems as they could no longer rely on husbands, slave owners, or other ties to men, and were forced to turn to prostitution. This often tainted them as "disreputable", which limited their further economic opportunities.

In Ottoman Aleppo, most prostitutes were immigrants from rural areas around the city and Southern Anatolia, and the number of prostitutes would increase in times of economic crisis.

In the Ottoman Empire, prostitutes were often former slaves. Slavery in the Ottoman Empire was nominally abolished by the Reform of 1889, and the Avret Pazarları slave market was officially closed by the Disestablishment of the Istanbul Slave Market. However, the nominal emancipation made it easier for employers to get rid of slaves they no longer wanted, by firing them rather than having to sell them. Former female slaves rarely had other options than to continue to work for their former enslavers. If they were fired, they were often forced to rely on prostitution to survive, and this situation was sufficiently common that the Young Turks founded the Hizmetçi İdaresi as a Servant Institution to assist former female slaves in finding employment as domestic workers and maidservants in order to escape having to work as prostitutes to survive.

== Male prostitutes ==
Most male prostitutes were registered with the state, and they often worked in public bathhouses. Same-sex relationships were considered inappropriate, but in practice were considered less immoral than adulterous relationships between men and women or sex with female prostitutes. Accordingly, some jurists excluded same-sex relationships from punishment. The government often only interfered with male prostitution in cases of male-on-male rape.

== Trafficking ==
In 1846–1847, the official Disestablishment of the Istanbul Slave Market pressed the slave trade in female slaves underground, from the open slave market to the private houses of the slave merchants, which is considered to have worsened the conditions of the slave market in Istanbul, by moving it away from state control and supervision.

During the late Ottoman Empire, Istanbul became a central hub for the trafficking of women, with networks operating both domestically and internationally. Istanbul's ports constituted the center of trafficking of women, serving as a bridge between Europe, the Middle East, Africa, and even America. Jewish, Greek, and European men worked in trafficking women, although women were more frequently responsible for trafficking women, and those caught procuring women were exiled. Often, women, particularly young, non-Muslim women were promised jobs and then sold to brothels. In parallel with this, chattel slave trade such as the Circassian slave trade, continued until the 20th century.

Within the Ottoman Empire, women could work as madams, and male imams and non-Muslims tavern owners also worked as pimps. Families sometimes engaged in the work of prostitution together, with couples, siblings, and in-laws facilitating the act, especially in Aleppo.
