= Undang-Undang Melaka =

Legal code of the Malacca Sultanate (1400–1511)

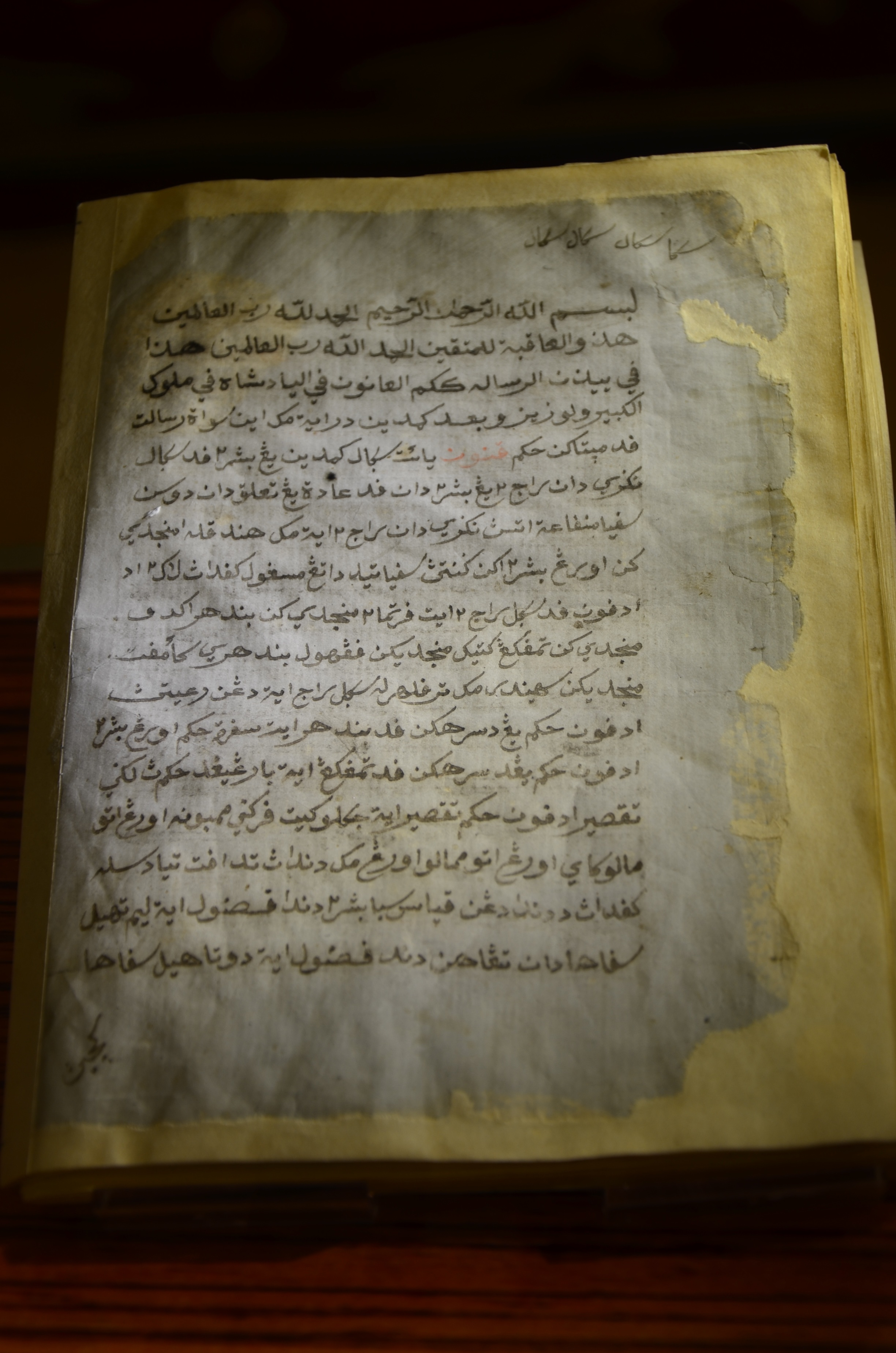
A copy of Undang-Undang Melaka displayed in the Royal Museum, Kuala Lumpur. Transcribed in AH 1175/AD 1762 by Sayid Al-Syarif Jamaluddin ibni Sayid Al-Syarif Abdullah in Mataram, Java.

Undang-Undang Melaka (Malay for 'Law of Malacca', Jawi: اوندڠ٢ ملاک ), also known as Hukum Kanun Melaka, Undang-Undang Darat Melaka and Risalah Hukum Kanun, was the legal code of the Malacca Sultanate (1400–1511). It contains significant provisions that reaffirmed the primacy of Malay customary law or adat, while at the same time accommodating and assimilating Islamic principles. The legal code is believed to have been originally compiled during the reign of Muhammad Shah (1424–1444), before it was continuously expanded and improved by the succeeding sultans. The Malacca system of justice as enshrined in the Undang-Undang Melaka was the first digest of laws, compiled in the Malay world. It became a legal resource for other major regional sultanates like Johor, Perak, Brunei, Pattani and Aceh, and has been regarded as the most important of Malay legal digests.

== History ==
According to Malay Annals, earliest form of justice system had been in existence since the early days of Malacca. Early Malaccan rulers promulgated court traditions and enforced the existing adat and religious rules to maintain social order. All rules, prohibitions and customs that have been codified as laws, were in turn collected through oral traditions and memorized by senior ministers of the sultanate. During the reign of Muhammad Shah, laws were issued and recorded along with provisions for punishments of every offenses. Among notable rules mentioned in the Malay Annals, were the prohibition of using yellow clothes and wearing golden anklets. Under the order of the fifth Sultan, Muzaffar Shah (1445–1459), the legal digest of Muhammad Shah was further refined with the inclusion new laws and regulations. It was then continued to be expanded and improved until the reign of the last sultan, Mahmud Shah (1488–1511).

As a part of important legacy of the Malacca Sultanate, which throughout its existence had exercised strong influence over Maritime Southeast Asia, the legal code of Malacca was copied and spread to other such sultanates as Johor, Perak, Aceh, Brunei and Pattani. It was made a reference in developing the local jurisprudence, with subsequent revisions and additions were made to its contents, to suit the usage in a particular sultanate. This has contributed to the existence of a variety of hybrid copies of the manuscript in different structures and contents. In sum, there are 50 known surviving manuscripts of Undang-Undang Melaka, which can be categorized into; fundamental, Aceh, Pattani, long, Islam and Johor, and fragmented or short versions.

== Content ==
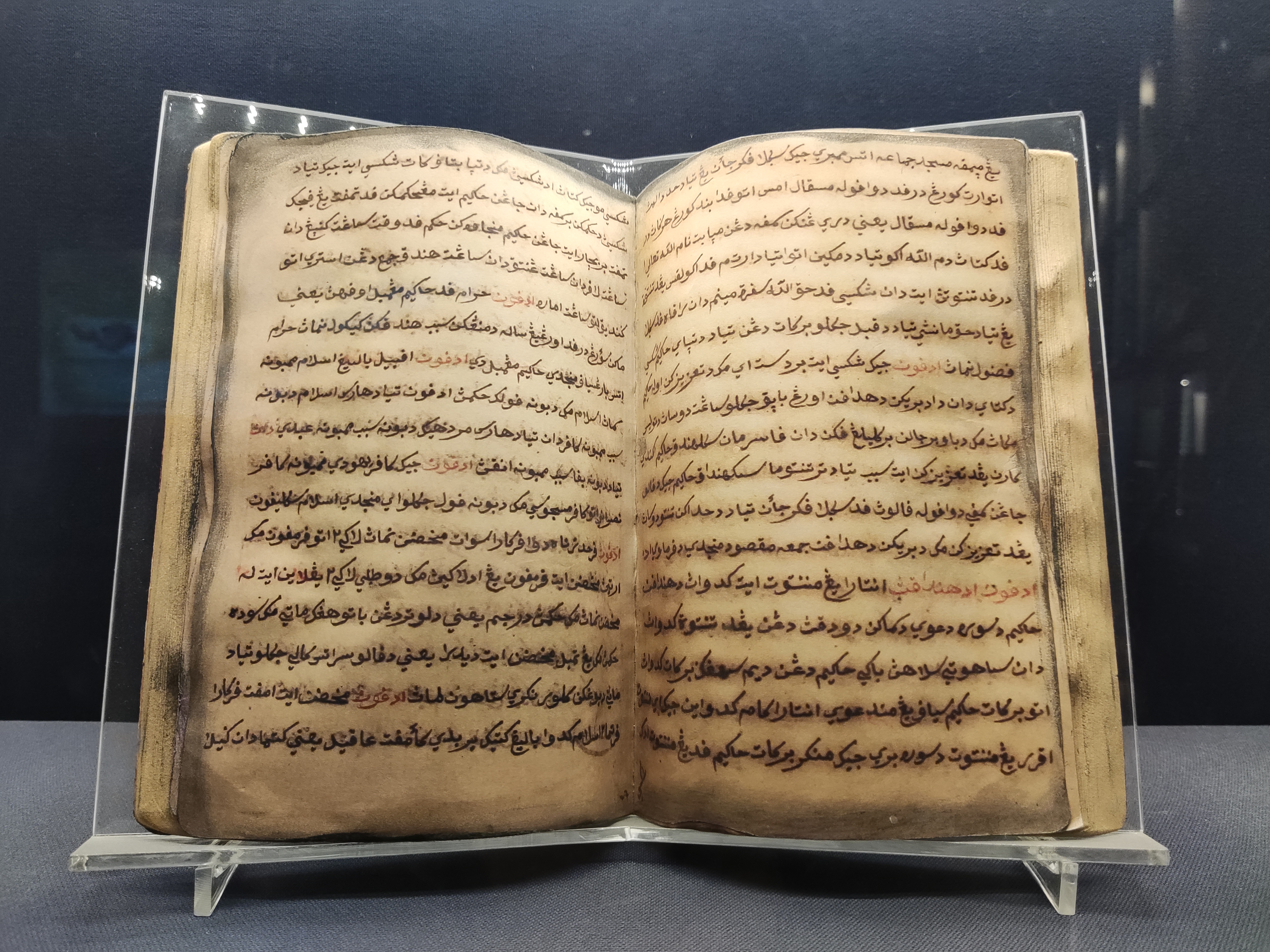
Replica displayed at Bank Negara Malaysia Museum and Art Gallery

Based on the published version of Undang-Undang Melaka, the text consists of six parts dealing among others with maritime, marriage and trade law. The six parts are:

- Intisari (abstract)
- Undang-Undang Laut (maritime law)
- Hukum Perkahwinan Islam (Islamic marital jurisprudence)
- Hukum Perdagangan dan Syahadat (Islamic economic jurisprudence)
- Undang-Undang Negeri (state law)
- Undang-Undang Johor (Johor law).

Due to continuous additions and revisions since the time of Malacca Sultanate, the original 19 chapters of the text was expanded to 22, and lastly to the longest 44 chapters that we know today. Although elements of customary law (adat) with influences from Animistic-Hindu-Buddhist era still prevailed in the text, marks of Islamic influences are strong, clearly evidenced with the existence of various terminologies and law of Islamic origin. For example, zina (section 40:2), qadhf or false accusation of zina (section 12:3), theft (section 7:2 and 11:1), robbery (section 43), apostasy (section 36:1), drinking intoxicants (section 42), baghy (section 5 and section 42). Qisas and diyya is legislated in section 5:1, 3; section 8:2, 3; section 18:4 and section 39, causing injury in section 8:2 and its various types in sections 16, 17, and 21. Punishment for the abovementioned crimes conform with those of classical Islamic law. There are also provisions for crimes punishable with tazir, i.e., when the crime lacks the conditions for hudud penalty (section 11:1), kissing between a man and a woman (section 43:5), gambling (section 42), giving false testimony (section 36).

Section 25:2 is an example of provisions for Islamic marital jurisprudence, it outlines the conditions for ijab and qabul as well as rulings and conditions for witnesses. Besides that, the rulings on the dissolution rights or khiyar, talaq and all the conditions related to it, including the muhallil (a type of marriage when a man marries an irrevocably divorced woman so that after divorcing her she may get remarried to her first husband), are all contained in section 27 and 28:1. An example on provisions related to Islamic economic jurisprudence is section 30, that provides rulings on riba. The same section also identify the types of goods allowed in trade as well as those prohibited such as alcoholic drinks, dogs, pigs and rice wine.

Undang-Undang Melaka also absorbed directly several fiqh rulings by referring to texts like Fath al-Qarib from Ibn Al-Qasim al-Ghazi, al-Taqrib from Imam Abu Syuja' and lastly Hasyiyah 'ala Fath al-Qarib from Ibrahim al-Bajuri. Thus, based on its references, historians have concluded that Undang-Undang Melaka is more inclined to Shafi'i school of thought. This is further supported by section 36:2, which outlines the ruling on salat in accordance with Shafi'i thought.

== See also ==
- Undang-Undang Laut Melaka
- Hukum Kanun Pahang

== Bibliography ==
- Abd. Jalil Borham (2002), Pengantar Perundangan Islam (An Introduction to Islamic Legislature), Johor Bahru: Universiti Teknologi Malaysia press, ISBN 983-52-0276-1
- Fauzia, Amelia (2013), Faith and the State: A History of Islamic Philanthropy in Indonesia, BRILL, ISBN 978-9004233973
- Liaw, Yock Fang (2007), "Naskah Undang-Undang Melaka: Suatu Tinjauan (Manuscript of Undang-Undang Melaka: an overview)" (PDF), Sari, 25: 85–94, archived from the original (PDF) on 2019-11-01
- Ooi, Keat Gin (2004), Southeast Asia: a historical encyclopedia, from Angkor Wat to East Timor, ABC-CLIO, ISBN 1-57607-770-5
