= Undang-Undang Laut Melaka =

Undang-Undang Laut Melaka (Malay for 'Maritime laws of Melaka', Jawi: اوندڠ٢ لاءوت ملاک) was a legal code of Melaka Sultanate (1400–1511) that deals specifically on matters related to maritime laws and regulations, as well as nautical procedures concerning seafaring affairs of merchant vessels. It was composed by a group of Melakan shipowners, most of whom were Javanese in origin. The other important legal code of Melaka was the Undang-Undang Melaka ('laws of Melaka'), though it still contains certain provisions related to maritime laws, was sometime known as Undang-Undang Darat Melaka ('laws on the land of Melaka') instead. The clauses contained in the Undang-Undang Laut Melaka cover an extensive area, taking into account a wide variety of circumstances that could arise on a ship, with respect to social issues, such as slavery, adultery, murder, stealing, disrespecting an officer and negligence in carrying out duties; also, economic aspects such as tax and trade, including measurement of weight and area. The legal code also outlines a very well-structured organisation on ships, with titles of the officers are clearly specified complete with their responsibilities. In Melaka's court, matters related to the enforcement Undang-Undang Laut Melaka was placed under the authority of Laksamana ('admiral of the fleet').

== History ==
The actual date when the legal code was drafted remains unknown. However, based on its manuscript, the promulgation of Undang-Undang Laut Melaka was the result of a meeting of a group of Melakan nakhodas (sea captain) during the reign of Muhammad Shah (1424–1444):

First of all, Patih Harun and Patih Elias assembled Nakhoda Zainal, Nakhoda Dewa and Nakhoda Ishak, for the purpose of consulting and advising relative to the usages at sea, and of compiling, in conformity thereto, a code of Undang-Undang, or institutions. After they had consulted together, and collected the laws, they presented them to Datuk Bendahara, in the kingdom of Melaka, who laid them at the feet of the illustrious Muhammad Shah; whereupon the ruler said — I grant the request of the Bendahara, and establish these laws and institutions for your government and that of your posterity. When you administer these laws at sea, they shall not be afterwards interfered with on shore. Henceforth let the laws of the sea be carried into effect at sea, in like manner as those of the land are carried into effect on land; and let them not interfere with each other; for you (addressing himself to the nakhodas) are as rajas ('king') at sea, and I confer authority on you accordingly.

== Content ==
According to Stamford Raffles, the clauses of Undang-Undang Laut Melaka which numbered up to 20, can be grouped into four distinctive chapters:

=== Chapter I ===
1. Authority of the code.
2. Description of persons on board a vessel.
3. Of the officers and crew, their authority, duties, and the nature of their engagements — explains the administrative structure or hierarchy of power on ship. A ship is like a state or a kingdom where the nakhoda (sea captain) is the king. This power hierarchy follows successively downwards which partly described as the following:
4. Designation at sea	Comparative designation on land
  Nakhoda (sea captain)	Raja
  Juru mudi (helmsman)	Bendahara
  Juru batu ('leadsman')	Temenggung
  Malim (pilot)	Imam
  Tukang kanan (petty officer in charge of starboard)	Sida-sida
  Tukang kiri (petty officer in charge of portside)	Sida-sida
  Tukang agong ('head workman')	Sida-sida
  Awak-awak (crew)	Rakyat
5. Another position which was just as important as that of the nakhoda was that of the malim (pilot). It is rather difficult to find a comparative designation on the land, because most of his functions were maritime related. The position of malim is often compared to that of an imam (leader of prayer group) on a ship due to his sailing skills. He was the one who decides when to set sail because he is knowledgeable about the prevailing winds, storm prediction and waves, sandbanks and corals. Clearly, the malim was the first person to give advice to the nakhoda about each voyage. The function of the juru mudi, who was the nakhoda's closest aide, was comparable to that of the bendahara ('prime minister'). The juru batu is said to have been the same status as the temenggung ('chief of public security'), this means that his role was to keep the peace on the ship and act as a judge in any dispute. This corresponds to an excerpt of Undang-Undang Laut Melaka, "….to decide right and wrong". Undang-Undang Laut Melaka gives an example, a crewman (awak-awak) who refused to follow the orders of the tukang agong was punished by the juru batu by canning of up to seven strokes. Among other provisions in the clause are:
  - Rules and procedures for the crew on the duty of berkepang (guarding the ship). Four points are mentioned for the guard to pay attention to: water getting into the ship, incoming storms and wind, enemies boarding the ship, and fire outbreaks.
  - Details on the duties of muda-muda; controlling the ship's rudder, guarding the weapons, defending the ship in warfare. They also responsible as the personal guards to nakhoda in ports.
  - Procedures for the crew who guarded the ship's tupai (the main of access point between deck and hold).
  - Procedures on supplies (food) for the awak-awak.
  - It was established that the nakhoda was responsible for providing a loan to whoever required it. This is subject to certain procedures and processes, including the repayment terms and tax levied. For example, it is stated that the person who borrows is normally tied to an agreement for three years, three months, there days.
6. Of the kiwis, or travelling merchants — in the 15th century Melaka, a system of commenda was well developed, whereby merchants would send goods in another man's ship, either in the care of some of his agents, travelling as kiwis, or entrusted to the nakhoda for a fixed return. The clause outlines the responsibilities of a kiwi especially in matters related to rental rates and rights to a petak (a partition for storing goods). The duties of the kiwi to look after the petak he rented and the time period allowed, are also mentioned in the clause . Penalties are specified for failure to fill up the rented petak within the stipulated period. A kiwi may join a ship's voyage in several ways; firstly, by renting a petak, secondly, by assisting the nakhoda with a capital of three or four tahils of gold, or by making an agreement to give 3/10 of his sales to the nakhoda. Also mentioned in this clause are the responsibilities of the maula or penghulu kiwi ('chief kiwi'). The chief kiwi shall be entitled to half of the division of hold, in which the rice or provisions are stowed.

=== Chapter II ===
5. Of the divisions of a vessel — certain areas on board can only be occupied by selected people according to their status. For example, the balai lintang ('covered porch' or 'across hall') is specifically for meetings, while the balai bujur ('principal hall') is for muda-muda. The peterana lawang is reserved for the nakhoda, muda-muda and tukang agong, the awak-awak is prohibited to enter any of these three areas. The clause also mentions on other issues on petak rental and the status of the rental space should any matter arise with regard to the crew member, such as altercation, illness, criminal act and so forth.
6. Regulations for the safety of a vessel while at sea.
7. Of fire.
8. Of throwing cargo overboard — procedures of throwing the ship's cargo overboard in the event of a big storm, for the safety of the ship's crew. The cargo that need to be reduced will be thrown out depending on the rate and value owned by each passenger and shareholder of each petak.
9. Of vessel running foul of each other — rules and penalties for ships colliding at sea, especially during rainstorms. The clause also mentions the procedures taken if a ship hit 'lintang payer' (vessels anchored across the sea or rivers to collect tax); the fine had to be paid by all those sailing on the ship, whether a free man, a slave, old, young, poor, rich, men and women, everyone have to contribute.
10. Of putting into ports, and the mode of trading — procedures and regulations for trading at the ports/towns. On arrival at port, when the market was at its most favourable, the nakhoda had first right to sell his merchandise, four days before the kiwis and six days before other sailors.' The nakhoda also had the priority to offer his goods at the highest price. Anyone offering their goods at a higher price than the nakhoda could have his goods confiscated by the nakhoda after being paid only the cost price. This clause also stated that a nakhoda had to consult his officers if he wished to stop at any port which was not in the original schedule. In the same way, if he decided to cross a bay, strait, etc. he had to firstly get the consent of the juru mudi, juru batu and tukang agong.
11. Of detentions — the clause stated that: "when the season is nearly over, and the nakhoda omits to sail, the kiwi shall wait, on his account, for seven days, after which, if the nakhoda does not proceed, and the season is over, the price paid for the petak shall be returned to the kiwis. If the kiwis are the cause of the delay, and the season is nearly over, the nakhoda shall detain the vessel seven days on their account, after which he is authorised to sail without them, if they are not ready; and no more shall be paid or done relating thereto."
12. Of persons quitting a vessel.

=== Chapter III ===
13. Of persons who may be in distress, or who have been wrecked at sea — procedures for nakhoda who met castaways with their treasures, due to a shipwreck.
14. Of troves — procedures of distribution of confiscated treasures at sea. These procedures also followed the status categories of the beneficiaries-whether a slave, a person in debt or relative of the nakhoda. The code stated that: "Whatever is found on the sea, whovever may discover it, is the property of the nakhoda of the vessel, who may give what he thinks proper to the persons who found it. Whatever may be found on shore by persons belonging to the vessel, at the time when they are not acting under the nakhodas orders, nor performing the duty of the vessel, even if the parties are kiwis or turun menugen, the trove shall be divided into three parts, and one-third shall appertain to the finder, and the remaining two parts become the property of the nakhoda."
15. Of carrying off slaves from another country — procedures and laws for nakhoda who found slaves who had run away from their owners.

=== Chapter IV ===
16. Of crimes and punishments on board a vessel — penalties for those who fought and murdered on board ship including the punishment for a kiwi who tried to kill the nakhoda. There are also details of the persons who can be sentenced to death on board ship. Four types of offences can incur the death sentence;
17. i) Speaking offensively and being disloyal to the nakhoda.
  ii) Planning or collaborating with other crew members to kill the nakhoda, kiwi, tukang or malim.
  iii) A person who carries kris on board, whilst others do not.
  iv) Very bad behaviour and acting disrespectfully.
18. Of disrespectful and contumacious conduct towards the nakhoda — for one who is outspoken and rude to the nakhoda or kiwi, the person can be punished, and may be killed if he retaliates with hostility.
19. Of adultery, and criminal connection with women on board a vessel — this clause is explained according to the status of the offenders, whether a free man, a slave, a single girl, a bachelor, a wife, a husband.
20. Of quarrels and dissections — the clause for those who fought on board ship.
21. Of theft.

== See also ==
- Undang-Undang Melaka
- Hukum Kanun Pahang

== Bibliography ==
- Ahmad Sarji Abdul Hamid (2011), The Encyclopedia of Malaysia, vol. 16 - The Rulers of Malaysia, Editions Didier Millet, ISBN 978-981-3018-54-9
- Mardiana Nordin (2008), "Undang-Undang Laut Melaka: A Note on Malay Maritime Law in the 15th century", Memory and Knowledge of the Sea in Southeast Asia, Kuala Lumpur: Institute of Ocean and Earth Sciences (IOES), University of Malaya, ISBN 978-983-9576-36-8
- Reddie, James (1841), An Historical view of the law of maritime commerce, W. Blackwood and sons, ISBN 9780598467324
- Reid, Anthony (1993), Southeast Asia in the Age of Commerce 1450-1680. Volume Two: Expansion and Crisis, New Haven and London: Yale University Press
- Tarling, Nicholas (2000), The Cambridge History of Southeast Asia, vol. 2, Cambridge University Press, ISBN 978-052-1663-70-0
