= My body, my choice =

Slogan for bodily autonomy

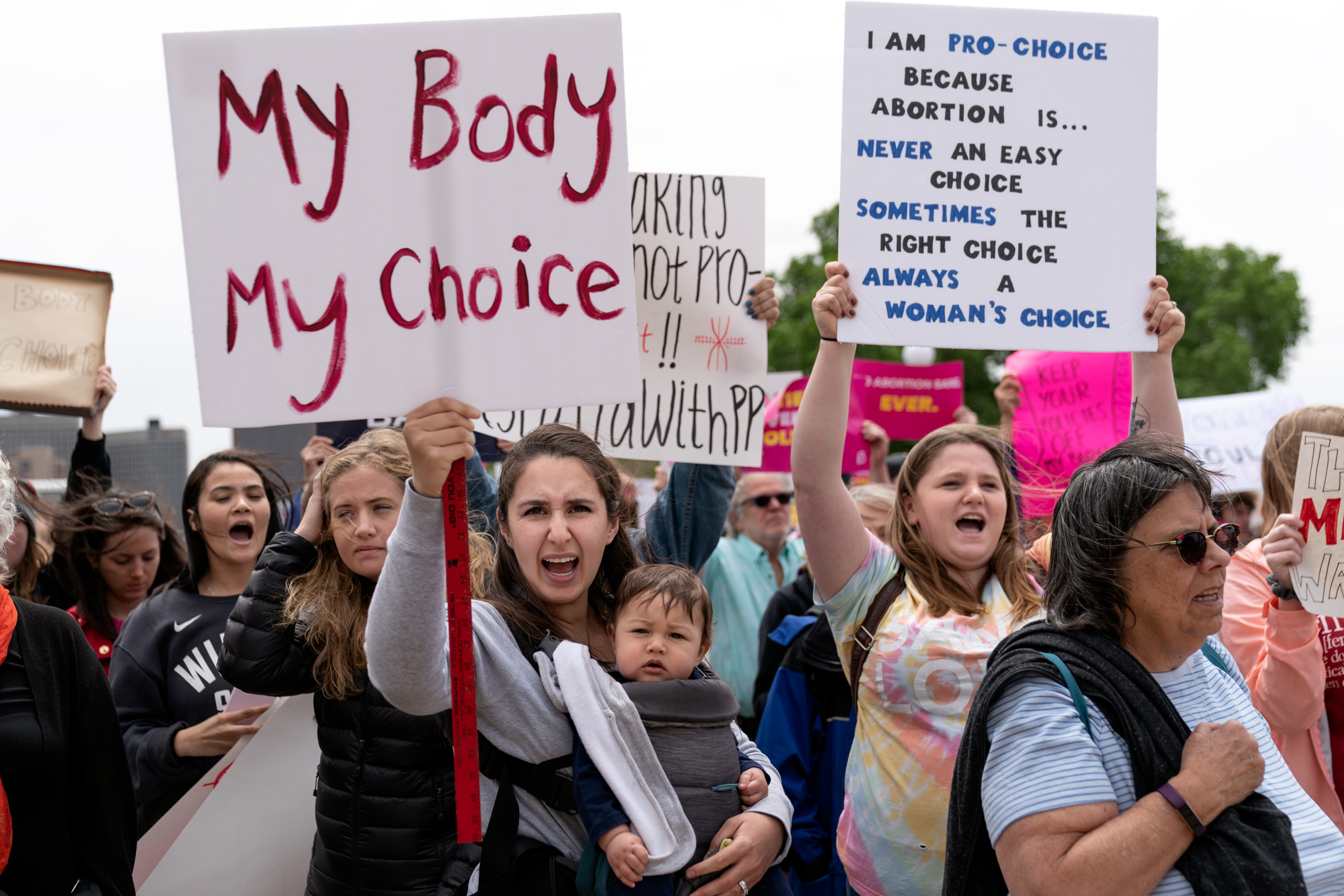
"My body / my choice" sign at a Stop Abortion Bans Rally in St Paul, Minnesota, May 2019

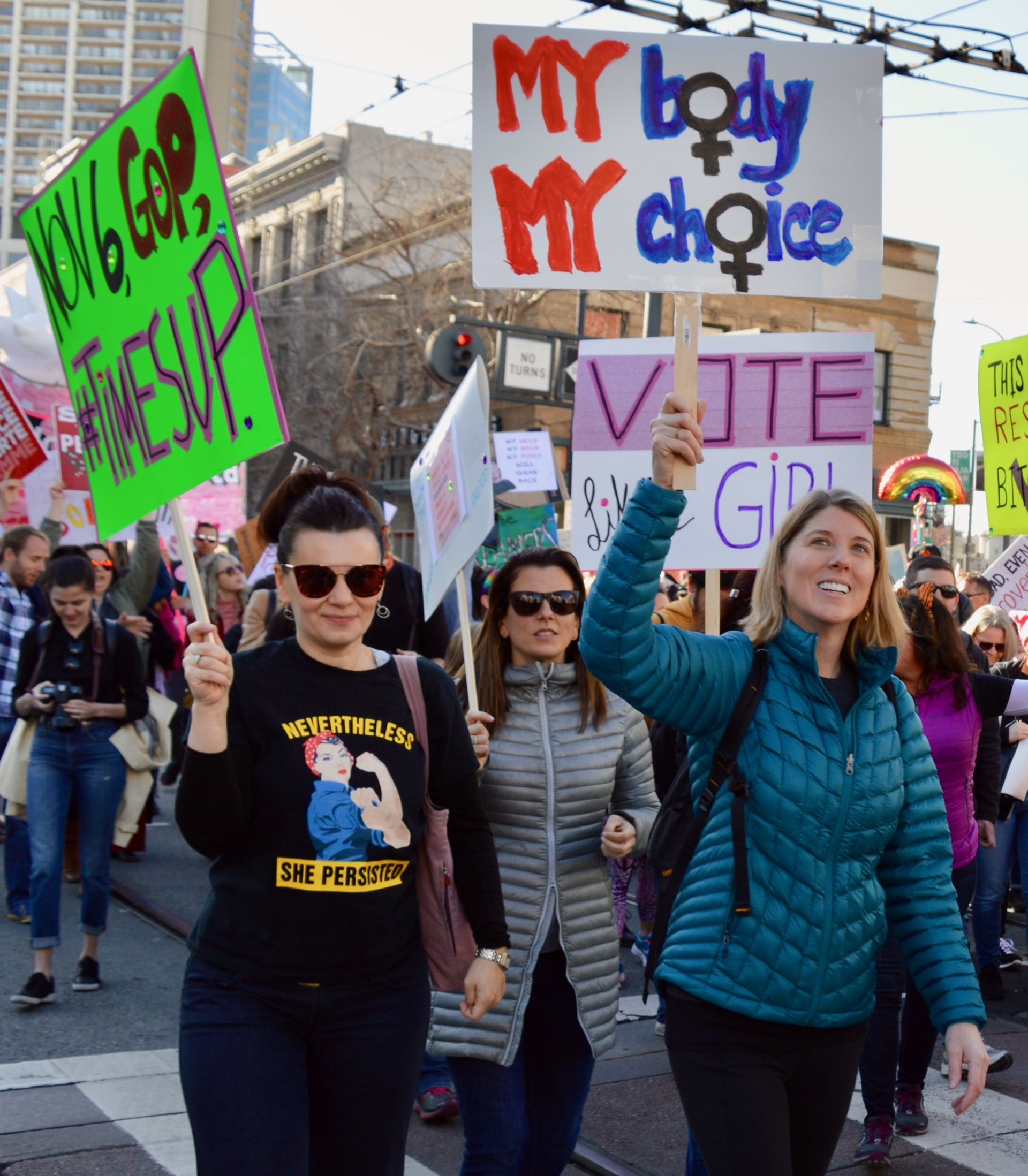
"My body / My choice" at Women's March San Francisco, January 2018

My body, my choice is a slogan describing freedom of choice on issues affecting the body and health, such as bodily autonomy, abortion and end-of-life care. The slogan emerged around 1969 with feminists defending an individual's right of self determination over their bodies for sexual, marriage and reproductive choices as rights. The slogan has been used around the world and translated into many different languages. The use of the slogan has caused different types of controversy in different countries and is often used as a rallying cry during protests and demonstrations and/or to bring attention to different feminist issues.

== Bodily autonomy and integrity ==
"My body, my choice" is a slogan that is meant to represent the idea of personal bodily autonomy, bodily integrity and freedom of choice. Bodily autonomy constitutes self determination over one's own body without external domination or duress. Bodily integrity is the inviolability of the physical body and emphasizes the importance of personal autonomy, self-ownership, and the self-determination of human beings over their own bodies. In the field of human rights, the violation of the bodily integrity of another is regarded as either unethical infringement and/or possibly criminal. Freedom of choice describes an individual's opportunity and autonomy to perform an action selected from at least two available options, unconstrained by external parties.

Academics have shown how the framework of individual choice allowed the slogan to cross over to a wide range of feminist political claims. However, this ideological flexibility also enabled its use by those protesting against COVID-19 restrictions and vaccination during the global pandemic. Feminists have also critiqued the slogan’s emphasis on individual choice, arguing that it overlooks systemic barriers to accessing abortion, including disparities in healthcare access linked to wealth, employment, citizenship, and the legacies of racism and discrimination. In response to these critiques and the slogan’s appropriation, organisations like Planned Parenthood have shifted away from pro-choice language, promoting alternatives such as 'Bans Off Our Bodies' and 'Protect Abortion Access' that emphasize community and systemic solutions.

According to Suzannah Weiss, the slogan, "My body, my choice" is a feminist idea which can be applicable to women's reproductive rights and other women's rights issues. It is also the opposite to treating women's bodies like property, and asserts the importance of a culture of consent. Rameeza Ahmad describes how the Pakistani version of "my body, my choice," "Mera Jism Meri Marzi," is important to feminists because it is important for women to know they have control over their own bodies. Kristin Rowe-Finkbeiner writes that while it seems simple that women's freedom is linked to women's own control and decisions about their own bodies, in practice the slogan of 'My body, my choice' is too often changed to mean of "not really your body, not really your choice." and women's rights like access to birth control, abortion, and reproductive health are attacked.

A background document for the International Conference on Population and Development (ICPD25) held at Nairobi summit in 2019 sums up, "state of complete physical, mental and social well-being in all aspects relating to sexuality and the reproductive system Good sexual and reproductive health" can only be termed to be "Good sexual and reproductive health", to achieve the same, every person need to have a right to make decisions governing their body and to access services that support those rights. The document further elaborates that everyone has the right to make their own choices about their own sexual and reproductive health, which means that every one should be able to have a satisfying and safe sex life, the right to self-determination to reproduce and the freedom to decide if, when and how often to do so.

== History and use ==
In late 1969 the slogan was coined as a feminist struggle for reproductive rights and subsequently noted by the global feminist struggle.

=== Austria ===
In June 2019, the Vatican City women's football team decided to withdraw from a football match with a Vienna-based Austrian women's football club, since Austrian women used the occasion to display the slogan "my body, my rules" on their bodies, along with pro LGBT slogans as a mark of protest against the Catholic Church's position on abortion.

=== Hong Kong ===
In 2011 Hong Kong started an anti slutshaming and anti victim blaming movement called slut walk. Its 7th annual march in 2018 focused on the "My body, my choice" slogan, to raise awareness against "sexual, gender and body-based" violence prevalent in Hong Kong.

=== India ===
In India the concept of My body, my choice was discussed in a March 2003 article in the Indian women's magazine, Femina.

In March 2015 a short film, My Choice, as part of Vogue India's social awareness initiative. Indian actress, Deepika Padukone, played the lead role and the film was directed by Homi Adajania. My Choice not only refers to reproductive rights but also a range of women's rights issues relating to South Asian women, such as freedom to choose clothing, movement, love, sex and marriage.

=== Malaysia ===
In December 2019, Malaysian Deputy Education minister, Teo Nie Ching launched an educational video called "My body is mine" to educate kids about 'Safe touch and unsafe touch' as part of child safety education and save them from possibilities of negative child grooming and decided to include the subject in Malay school books in subject Pendidikan Jasmani dan Kesihatan (Physical education and health).

=== Pakistan ===
Mera Jism Meri Marzi (Urdu: میرا جسم میری مرضی; lit. 'My body, my choice') is a feminist slogan used by feminists in Pakistan in context of women rights.

The slogan Mera Jism Meri Marzi was popularized by the Aurat March in Pakistan which has been observed on International Women's Day. The slogan has been very controversial. According to The Friday Times 2022 March end news report a man from Lahore killed his fifth time pregnant wife for chanting the slogan Mera Jism Meri Marzi.

=== South Africa ===
In 2018, multiple South African sexual and reproductive health and rights organizations came together to champion a social and community media initiative named #MyBodyMyChoice. The initiative "call[s] for protecting and promoting women's rights to make decisions about their reproductive health, bodies and lives." The underlying principle is that if it is a woman's body, she should be the one to make choices about and have the agency to access the health support she needs, and take well-informed decisions in relation to her own body, health and life. This considered a fundamental right—irrespective of their sexuality, where they live, how much they earn, or their ethnicity.

=== South Korea ===
In South Korea, the slogan of "my body, my choice" has meant choosing whether or not to marry and to have children. It is a push for single women's equality in the workplace, where there is a large wage gap between men and women.

=== Turkey ===
In 2012, an abortion rights demonstration in the Kadiköy district in Istanbul drew 3,000 women. Protesters carried banners reading "My body, my choice" in response to the government's plans to limit abortion access in the country.

=== United Kingdom ===
Emma Watson has worn T-shirts with the slogan, "my body, my choice" to bring attention to the need for funding of rape crisis centres in England and Wales.

=== United States ===
In 2015, in the United States, the slogan was used as a hashtag, to indicate support for Planned Parenthood, which was in danger of losing government funding. In 2019, as the most restrictive abortion law in the United States was signed by Alabama governor, Kay Ivey, demonstrators used the slogan outside of the Alabama Capitol in protest.

=== Zambia ===
In 2017 Protest in Lusaka for Women's empowerment issues Zambian women marched with slogans like "My Body, My Sexuality. My Rights, My Choice"; "My Body, My Choice"; "We Have the Right to Be Heard"; and "Before I'm a Woman, I'm a Human."

== Context of women's rights movements ==
Issues commonly associated with notions of women's rights include the right to bodily integrity and autonomy; to be free from sexual violence; to vote; to hold public office; to enter into legal contracts; to have equal rights in family law; to work; to fair wages or equal pay; to have reproductive rights; to own property; to education. According to Ursula Barry throughout human history the bodily autonomy of women has been contested. The notion of the body (but not the mind) being associated with women has served as a justification to deem women as property, objects, and exchangeable commodities (among men). For example, women's bodies have been objectified throughout history through the changing ideologies of fashion, diet, exercise programs, cosmetic surgery, childbearing, etc. This contrasts to men's role as a moral agent, responsible for working or fighting in bloody wars. The race and class of a woman can determine whether her body will be treated as decoration and protected, which is associated with middle or upper-class women's bodies. On the other hand, the other body is recognized for its use in labor and exploitation which is generally associated with women's bodies in the working-class or with women of color. Second-wave feminist activism has argued for reproductive rights and choice. The women's health movement and lesbian feminism are also associated with this debate. According to Barry, challenges facing women include sexual objectification, sexual harassment and gender based sexual abuse and violence. Barry emphasizes that women's freedom from violence is about the right to bodily integrity. While discussing choices surrounding reproduction, bodily autonomy is about freedom of one's own choices. Impediments posed by conservatives and religious and cultural moral police includes autonomy over one's own fertility includes both opposition to forms of positive fertility treatments, opposition to contraception, sterilization and also abortion. According to Barry, the right and access to abortion manifests one of the last struggles to achieve women's bodily autonomy.

According to Shehzil Malik, the slogan means that for all actions between people, actions require consent and that means that women need not experience their bodies getting groped, abused, harassed, or violated. According to Needa Kirmani this slogan disturbs those foundations of the patriarchy which controls and exploit women's bodies against their own will. Kirmani says those who oppose the slogan perpetuate a culture of rape, sexual harassment, child marriage, physical abuse, lack of healthcare, domestic violence, human trafficking, and bonded labour/slavery. According to Sondra Horton Fraleigh a woman's body is not determined by limitations but is a lived experience created through one's free-willed actions and choices in inter connected continuity with one's mind. Emma Fraser asserts that it is by a lack bodily autonomy society declines that women do have mind beyond their bodies and that amounts to cruelty with women.

"My body, my choice" also intersects with class struggles, which are also concerned with "a refusal of biopolitical control and the assertion of the right to live self-directed lives autonomous of the demands of the powerful."

=== Statistics ===
On the eve of International summit ICPD25 that is commemoration of 25th year of International Conference on Population and Development held at Nairobi in November 2019; UNFPA news report presents grim picture with help of global statistics; more than 800 women die from preventable causes during pregnancy and childbirth. As well as this, 33,000 girls are forced in marriages every day. 4 million girls are forced to go through female genital mutilation every year and an estimated 232 million women who would prefer modern contraception to prevent pregnancies are unable to access them.

According to UNFPA's 2019 State of World Population Report, which could avail key information on status of Women's status of decision making role only for 51 countries; out of the countries where information was available only 57% women either married or in relationship could make decisions regarding sexual intercourse with their partner, contraception use and health care. Only two countries namely Philippines and Ukraine were found to be in forefront with 81% women could ensure sexual and reproductive autonomy for themselves. Mali, Niger and Senegal were in lowest list with only 7% women getting freedom to decide about their own bodies regarding sexual intercourse with their partner, contraception use and health care. According to UNFPA Executive Director Dr. Natalia Kanem, it is long way to go for all girls and women to have autonomy in decision making and means to govern their own bodies.

== Variations and translations in other languages and geographies ==
Some variations in English include, "My life my choice; My life my rules", "My body, my rules. My life, not yours", "Keep your laws off my body", and "My body, my terms". During the April 2004 march in Washington, D.C., a pro-abortion March raised slogans like "My Body Is Not Public Property!", "It's Your Choice, Not Theirs!", "The government does not belong in our bedrooms...It does not belong in our doctors' offices." Anti-abortion protesters replied with "Have compassion on the little ones!" and "Women Need Love, Not Abortion." placards. The pro-abortion marchers responded with slogans like "Pro-life, that's a lie, you don't care if women die", and "Not the church, not the state, women will decide their fate." In 2014 Amnesty international campaigned with slogan "My body, my rights".

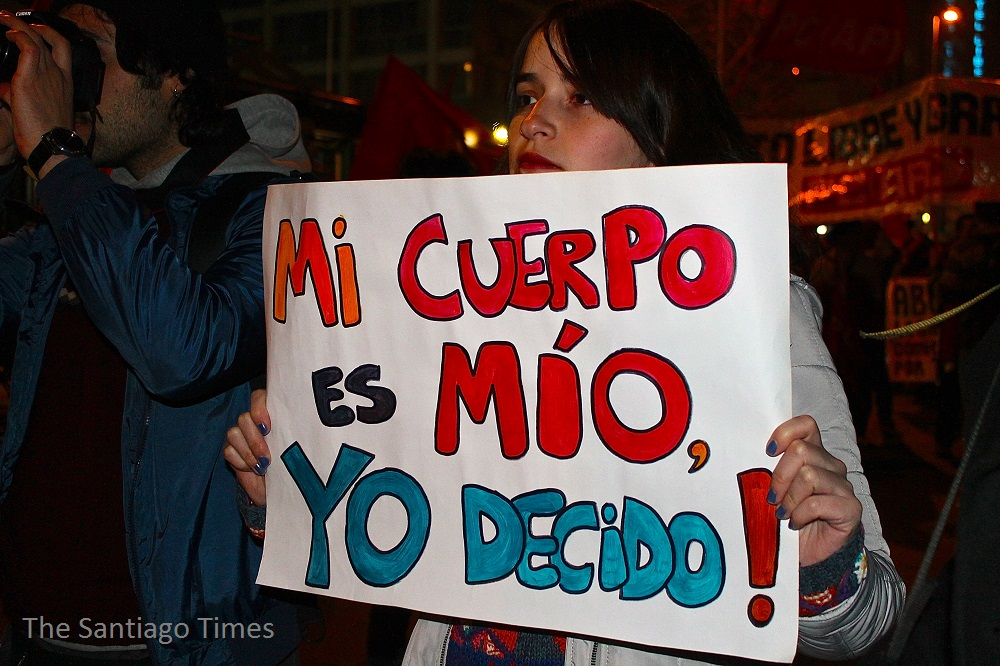
A demonstrator carries a placard that reads, "Mi cuerpo es mío Yo Decido" ("My body is mine, I decide", during a pro-abortion march in Santiago, Chile, July 25, 2013.

In the Bangla language, the slogan is "shorir amar shidhhanto amar". In Spanish it is translated as "Mi cuerpo es mío" ("My body is mine.") In French it is "Mon corps, mon choix" (My body, my choice). In German, the commonly used slogan is "Mein Körper gehört mir!" ("My body belongs to me!"). On 11 March 2013, Amina Sboui was the first Tunisian woman to post a photograph of herself nude from the waist up on Facebook, with the phrase "My body is mine and not the source of anybody's honour" in Arabic.

In Russian and Ukrainian languages words meaning 'body' rhyme with words meaning 'matter, concern', so the slogan is translated as 'My body, my business': Russian: моё тело — моё дело, Ukrainian: моє тіло ― моє діло.

The Urdu language slogan Mera Jism Meri Marzi (My body, my choice) has some variations too. In Aurat March in Pakistan, many signs found a way to spin the main four words of Mera Jism Meri Marzi into statements like Meri zindagi, meri marzi (My life, my choice), Meri zindagi mere faisale (My life, my decisions), Meri zindagi, mera haq, mera ikhtiyar (My life, my right, my discretion). Mera wajood, meri marzi (my existence, my choice).

In India an alleged rape case victim phrased her argument in Hindi Mera sharir mera hai, mere employer ka khilona nahi (My body is mine, Not a toy to be played by my employer).

== Advocacy and criticism ==
=== India ===
When the 2015 viral short film, My Choice, starring Deepika Padukone, was released, it received a largely negative response on social media. Quartz India criticized the film for being hypocritical, since Padukone was advocating choice, while still adhering to patriarchal standards in other movies she stars in. The writer of the Quartz article, Gunjeet Sra, felt that the choices made only reflected those already approved by society.

=== Pakistan ===
Some of the criticism of "My body, my choice" in comes from the religious right in Islam. Both men and women from "conservative Islamist organizations", such as Jamiat Hafsa, have protested against the Pakistani version of the slogan, 'Mera Jism Meri Marzi'. In 2020, these hardline critics of the slogan stated that it was "anti-Islamic" to imply that women could do as they wished with their bodies.

Sometimes the criticism of the slogan is that it is too strident and inappropriate. Men in Pakistan who support women's rights may not support the slogan itself. The slogan is considered vulgar and many see the slogan as being only about "sexual independence", rather than about the whole sum of bodily autonomy. Writer Anjum Altaf says that critics' attempts to suggest alternative slogans to 'My body, my choice' don't realize that this amounts to mansplaining by subjecting feminist struggle to patriarchal approval what actually they are fighting against.

Writer Zainab Najeeb contends that the slogan is neither a challenge to religious beliefs, nor should it been seen as scandalous. Najeeb states that opponents of the slogan 'Mera Jism Meri Marzi' believe it is about promoting prostitution, and asserts that the slogan is a declaration of women's independence and bodily freedom. Proponents of the slogan claim that it is being misinterpreted and misunderstood by critics. It is also suggested that the slogan continues to be expanded in definition to apply to opposition against abuse and harassment of women. Rameeza Ahmad states that women everywhere have to face huge patriarchal injustices against their own bodies. Like men, women too need to have right to choose their religion or what they want to wear (or not wear) and that the message behind the slogan is very important. Mehr Tarar asserts that women's claim of rights over their own bodies and own choices is a God-given right strengthened by the finest of human values.

=== Turkey ===
The President of Turkey, Recep Tayyip Erdoğan, is anti-abortion and has criticized the slogan. Erdoğan has said, "They say it is my body, my choice. Feminists say this...No one has the right to abort a fetus in a body."

=== United States ===
Criticism of the use of "my body, my choice" in the United States often comes in response to its use in abortion rights issues. Critics claim that the slogan fails to include the fetus as an entity that deserves a voice and a right to bodily autonomy as well. The slogan or "attitude" of "my body, my choice" has also been criticized by anti-abortion advocates as being an essentially "self-centered" choice.

Comedian Dave Chappelle critiqued that phrase in a comedy sketch. Whilst defending the unilateral right of women to decide whether they have an abortion, he added that if a woman decides to keep the baby, the man shouldn't be forced to pay for it: "If you can kill this motherf---er [sic], I can at least abandon them. It’s my money, my choice."

Nicholas J. Fuentes
(@NickJFuentes)
tweeted:

Your body, my choice. Forever.

November 5, 2024

White nationalist Nick Fuentes mocked the term after Donald Trump was announced as the winner of the 2024 election. Fuentes tweeted, "Your body, my choice. Forever." Left wing opponents of Fuentes doxxed him in retaliation, with the message: "Your House, Our choice".

The phrase "Your body, my choice. Forever", became popular on TikTok, where female users reported that accounts were commenting "your body, my choice" en masse on their posts. On November 8, the Institute for Strategic Dialogue published a report detailing the exponential increase of the phrase's usage on X (formerly Twitter), TikTok, Facebook, and Reddit on the day after the 2024 elections. They also noted instances of its usage offline, specifically on high school and college campuses.

The phrase “my body, my choice” was used in New York by some sex workers advocating for the decriminalisation of sex work.

=== Zambia ===
2018 UN Gender equality index indexes Zambia at 131 out of 162 countries. In Zambia a youth collective called 'Africa First' takes lead in creating social dialogue awareness regarding youth sexuality and abortion and stigma around the issue. Feminist Coven and Sistah Sistah Foundation have arranged women's rights Marches around the same themes with slogans like 'keep your policies off my body' to contest rape culture and raise their voices on issues like education and reproductive health to equal political and economic representation.

== In popular culture ==
=== Books ===
In writer Laurell K. Hamilton's novel Danse Macabre, the character Ronnie asks another character, Anita, "how you can be pro-choice and pro-life same time?" Anita replies that she wants women to have choices; still there is another life once big enough to live outside the womb.

My Body My Choice: The Fight for Abortion Rights was written by Robin Stevenson and published in 2019. The book covers the conflict over abortion around the world. Booklist wrote that it "should be required reading for teens of every gender."

Author Jess McCabe introduces a glossary of concepts related to the slogan 'My body, my choice' which includes Abortion, Bodily autonomy, Contraception, First nations, Forcible sterilization, Gendered, Heteronormativity, Institutionalized culture, LGBTQI, Prenatal testing, Pro-choice, Reproductive justice, Selective abortion, Sex positive feminism, Sexual consent, Social model of disability, Social mores, Social justice; in her book 30-Second Feminism: 50 Key Ideas, Events, and Protests, Each Explained in half a minute.

=== Exhibition ===
As part of the women's rights movement with the concept of "My body, my choice", South Africans arranged photography and multimedia exhibitions. One exhibition named Voices and Choices, curated by director Mmabatho Montsho, presented abortion stories and experiences with the mediums of photography, graphics, art and videos. Larissa Klazinga of Rhodes university, experimented with exhibition of photographs of various protest messages which women identify themselves, with a view of contesting objectification and injustices along with their naked bodies, with a concept that women have power to speak about their own bodies and decide how much to reveal for themselves.

=== Fashion ===
In 2019, Gucci debuted a fashion collection based on feminist social movements. The collection was inspired by fashion of the 1970s and included clothing bearing the words, "My body, my choice."

=== Film ===
Actor Arnold Schwarzenegger's character Dr. Alex Hesse used the phrase in the 1994 film Junior in relation to the character's rights and desires regarding their reproductive capability.

== Use outside of feminist issues ==
=== Vaccination ===
Those who are against mandatory vaccination have used the slogan to express their right to refuse to be vaccinated or to vaccinate their children. The slogan has been similarly co-opted by those against the wearing of face masks during the COVID-19 pandemic. Academic analysis has explored the phrase’s cultural and political evolution, highlighting the reasons for its appropriation across diverse contexts, including its hostile repurposing in anti-vaccine rhetoric."

=== Opponents of infant circumcision ===
Opponents of infant circumcision have used the slogan as a critique of the practice's alteration of infant genitals. Circumcision's legality, requirements, and recommendation by medical bodies varies, largely on grounds of bodily autonomy.

=== Transhumanism ===
According to Kyle Munkittrick in Discover, "My body, my choice" can also be claimed by transhumanists.

=== End-of-life care ===
End-of-life care can be seen through "My body, my choice".

== See also ==
- A Change of Sex
- Abortion debate
- Abortion in Turkey
- Abortion-rights movement
- Cognitive liberty
- Freedom of choice
- International Conference on Population and Development
- Intersex human rights
- Liberty
- Morphological freedom
- My Body My Rules
- My Body, My Child
- My Choice (disambiguation)
- My Death, My Decision
- My Life My Choice
- Planned Parenthood
- Reproductive rights
- Right to die
- Right to personal identity
- Self-ownership
- Sexual and reproductive health and rights
- United Nations Commission on Population and Development
- United Nations Population Fund
- Voluntary euthanasia
