= Aurat March =

Annual Pakistani women's rights marches

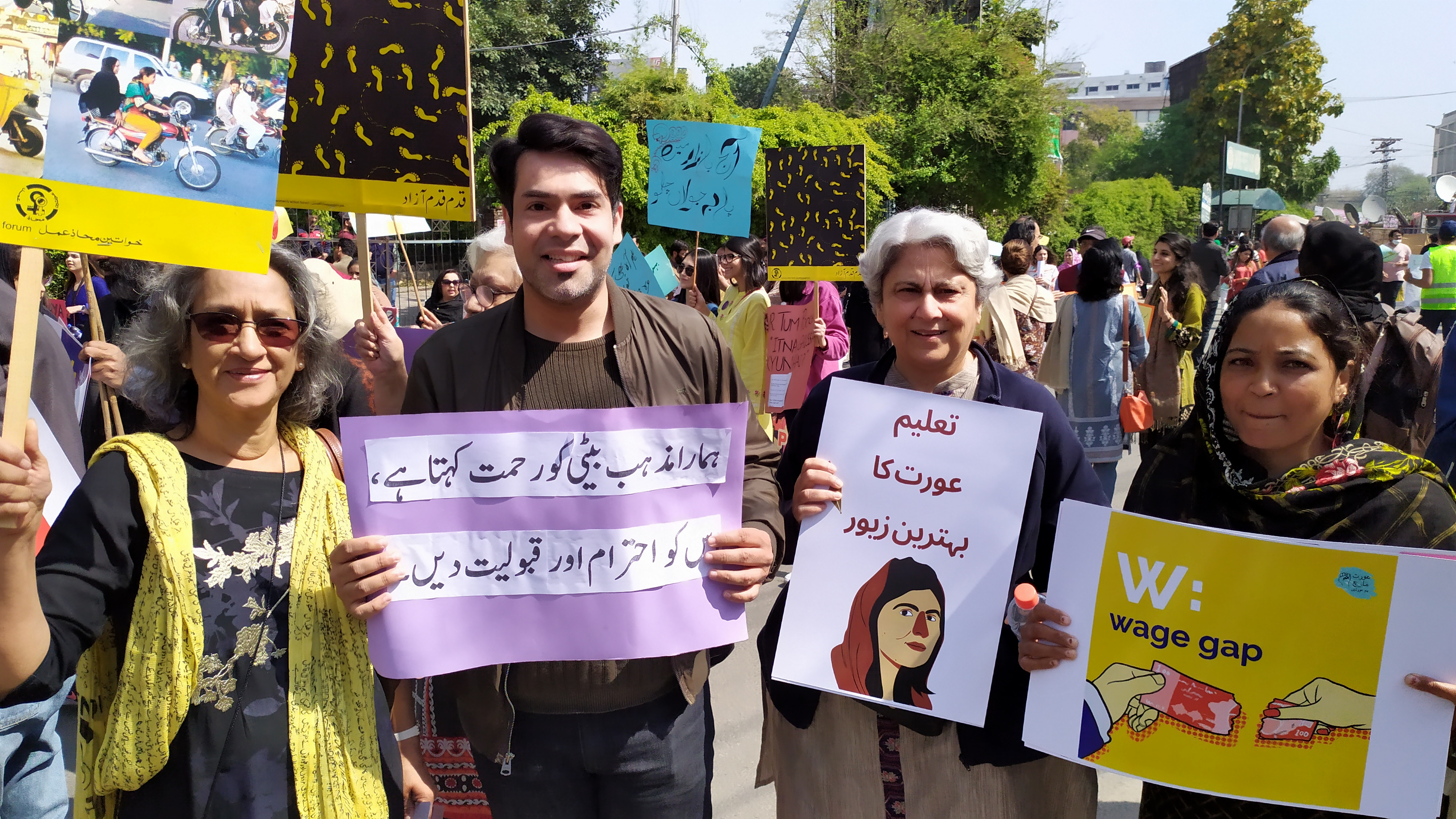
Marchers holding placards during Aurat March 2020

The Aurat March (Urdu: عورت مارچ, lit. 'Women's March') is a non-violent annual socio-political demonstration in Pakistani cities such as Islamabad, Karachi, Lahore, Multan, Peshawar to observe International Women's Day on 8 March.

The first Aurat Marches were begun by women's collectives in parallel with the Pakistani #MeToo movement on International Women's Day. The first march was held on 8 March 2018 in Karachi. Marches were organized in 2019 in Lahore and Karachi by Hum Auratein (We the Women, a women's collective) and elsewhere in the country, including Islamabad, Hyderabad, Sukkur, Peshawar, Mardan, and Faisalabad, by Women Democratic Front (WDF), Women's Action Forum (WAF), and other groups. The march was endorsed by the Lady Health Workers Association and included representatives of a number of women's-rights organizations.

The march calls for greater accountability for violence against women and supports women who experience violence and harassment at the hands of security forces, in public spaces, at home, and in the workplace. Women and men carry posters with slogans such as Ghar ka Kaam, Sab ka Kaam ("Housework is everyone's work"), and Mera Jism Meri Marzi ("My body, my choice") became a rallying cry.

== Manifesto ==
The march manifesto demands economic justice, including implementation of labor rights and the Protection Against Harassment of Women at the Workplace Act, 2010, recognition of women's unpaid contributions to the "care economy", and provision of maternity leave and daycare centers to ensure women's inclusion in the labor force. It also demands access to safe air and drinking water, protection of animals and wildlife, recognition of women's participation in the production of food and cash crops, access to a fair judicial system, the inclusion of women with disabilities and the transgender community, reproductive justice, access to public spaces, inclusion in educational institutions, the rights of religious minorities, promotion of an anti-war agenda, and an end to police brutality and forced disappearances.

== Themes ==
According to Zuneera Shah, the etymology of the word aurat is misogynistic and it has controversial roots in Arabic. Due to this, many Indian, Iranian, and Arab feminists find the word problematic. Western dominance of feminism has encouraged a dislike of the movement in countries such as Pakistan. Localization of the struggle for women's rights is important to South Asian activists relating to the feminist movement. Shah says that with the Aurat March, concepts such as pidar shahi (patriarchy) are receiving a wider circulation.

The theme of the 2018 march was "Equality", and the theme of the 2019 march was "Sisterhood and Solidarity". According to Nighat Dad, "The agenda of this march was to demand resources and dignity for women, for the transgender community, for religious minorities and those on the economic margins but more importantly to acknowledge that women's emancipation is inherently linked with the improvement of all mistreated groups and minorities". The themes of the 2020 march were khudmukhtari (autonomy) and violence, sexual and economic.

== Non-violence ==
The Marchers mostly rely on obstructive nonviolence tactics that disrupt injustice without using force, like public demonstrations, marches, and symbolic occupation of civic spaces. Constructive nonviolence tactics are also deployed to build solidarity, through grassroot education, talking circles, legal awareness campaigns, and networking opportunities.

== 2018 and 2019 marches ==
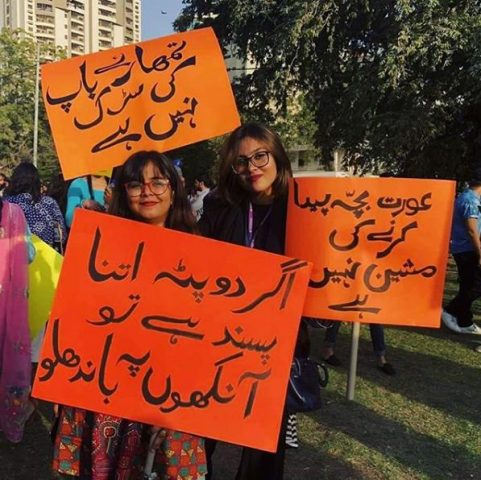
Marchers in 2019

Hundreds of signs at the march highlighted fundamental rights such as access to education and employment. "Mera Jism Meri Marzi" (My body, my choice) became the best-known slogan of the march. Other slogans included "Why are you afraid of my self-determination?", "A woman's right to autonomy over her own body", and "In fact, everyone should get to decide for themselves what happens to their body". Slogans in the 2018 march included "Our rights are not up for grabs and neither are we", "Girls just wanna have fundamental human rights", "Transwomen are women; shut up!", "Tu kare tou Stud, Mai Karun tou slut" ("If you do it you're a stud, but if I do it I'm a slut"), "Safe-street program for women", "Stop being menstrual-phobic", "Consent ki Tasbeeh Rozana Parhen" ("Ask for consent every time") and "Paratha rolls, not gender roles".

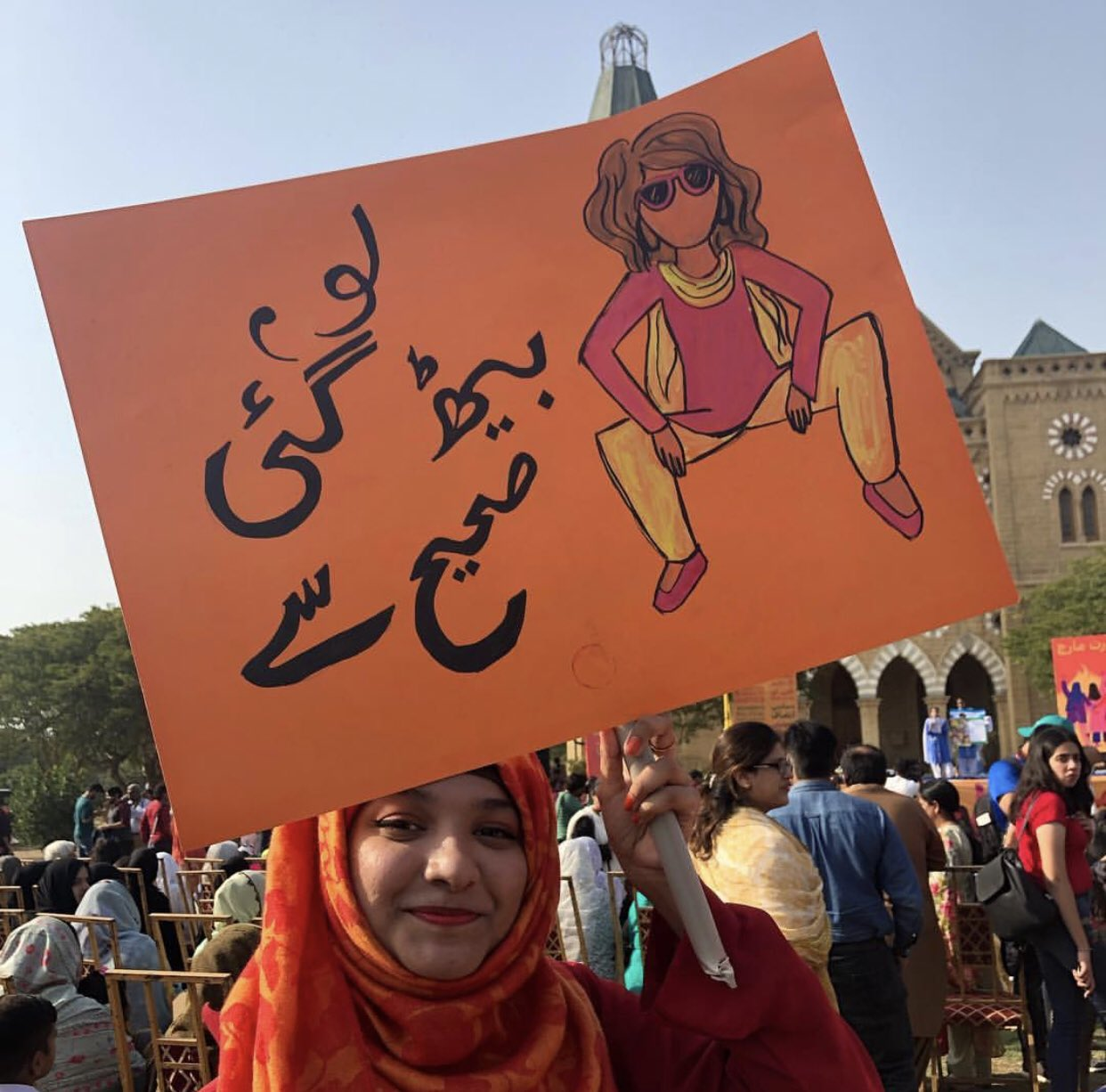
A sign during the 2019 march saying Lo Beth Gayi Sahi Se ("There you go, now I'm sitting properly")

In March 2019, signs appeared saying "Jab tak aurat tang rahay gi, jang rahay gi, jang rahay gi" ("As long as women are restricted, war will persist, war will persist"), "Men of quality will never be afraid of equality" and "Keep your dick pics to yourself". Another had a drawing of a vagina and two ovaries with the slogan, "Grow a pair!" Other signs read, "If you like the headscarf so much, tie it around your eyes"; a girl sitting with her legs spread and "Lo Beth Gayi Sahi Se" ("Here, I'm sitting correctly"), and "Nazar teri gandi aur purdah mein keroun" ("Your gaze is filthy, yet I'm the one who has to veil?") "Aaj waqai maa behn ek ho rahi hai" depicts all women coming together without differences. One sign said that perhaps because women are no longer tawaifs, some consider every independent woman one. Others read, "My shirt is not short, it's your mindset that is narrow" and "Oh, I am sorry. Does this hurt your male ego?" "These are my streets too" claimed public spaces.

In her article, Ailia Zehra analyzes a sign reading: "If Cynthia does it, she's applauded. If I do it, I'm the villain." (Cynthia D. Ritchie – an American living in Pakistan – tweeted a photo of herself on a bicycle to encourage women to use public spaces, unaware of her perceived privileged status as a white woman).

Nighat Dad, who organized the women's march in Lahore, said that people were angry about the posters because most Pakistanis – especially men – were not yet ready to allow the marchers freedom of choice. Dad said that topics such as women's sexuality and their rights to their own bodies are being discussed for the first time because of the march, but "Online harassment has gone too far in terms of death and rape threats to the organizers and also to the marchers." According to Nisha Susan, the slogan "Lo Baith Gayi Theek Se" ("Here, I'm sitting correctly") is not about woman-spreading but is an opposition to the constant policing of women's bodies.

Opponents called the marchers "vulgar" opportunists who had transgressed conservative Pakistani values and replaced a struggle for rights with an anti-Islamic agenda. Feminist writer Sadia Khatri describes the narrative in an article, saying that posters advocating education, inheritance, and marital rights receive less attention. Feminism based on respectability is not feminism, and gatekeeping encourages oppression.

In the article "Womansplaining the Aurat March: Dear men, here's why Pakistan's women are asserting their rights", Rimmel Mohydin tells men to "smile, you'll look prettier that way." Mohydin notes that women are the subject of sexist jokes, but are considered offensive if they make sexist jokes: "Every wisecrack, every sassy one-liner, every appealing slogan masked years and years of invisible pain that women have suffered". A woman can tell a man that she won't warm his bed if he doesn't warm his own food, but what upsets men is that she could laugh at his expense. Mohydin writes, "It is difficult to know where to place your feet when you find that the backs that you have been walking on are now standing up. That's why the author's compassion is with misogynist politicians." Referring poster slogan "Keep your dick pics to yourself ... What seems to have affronted the male collective the most is the shattering of a fantasy world where women enjoy being subjected to unsolicited pictures of male genitals ... Nobody seems to say anything to the sender, but the reluctant receiver is apparently the problem. Either she likes it (which, to them, makes her a 'slut') or she doesn't (which offends them). So as usual, women cannot win ... Are they upset at the loss of this opportunity to titillate women with their phallus? Why are they all shrivelling up? Have protesting women given them performance anxiety? ... The placards were a mirror and instead of taking this moment as an opportunity to introspect, they have decided to beat their chest instead. Not their slain bodies, not their acid-burnt faces, not their immobility, not their lack of representation, not the dearth of affordable housing, not the moral policing their choices and bodies are subjected to, not the denial of female education, not the constant threat of sexual harassment and onslaught, not the social structures that cut women's potential in half, not the exploitation, not the objectification, not the fact that for many, women are still not human".

The 2019 March was followed by mass cyberbullying against attendees of the March. Slogans on placards brought by attendees to the March were doctored and replaced with controversial statements to malign the movement and its aims. According to an article by Zuneera Shah, many attendees went through considerable cyberharrassment after the March, to the extent of receiving violent threats inciting violence and rape against attendees. One Marcher's face and placard were also featured without their consent on national television during a segment defaming Aurat March which aired on HumTV, one of the leading national television channels. An organizer of Aurat March Lahore added, "No amount ofbacklash can take away the magic that happens on that day. It fuels us all for the entire year."

Film star Shaan Shahid tweeted that the posters did not represent Pakistani culture or values. Shahid was criticized for his films, which sexualize women and reduce them to props emphasizing his character's masculinity, and defended his position as freedom of expression. Actress Veena Malik was criticized for tweeting that the march had "brought humiliation to [the] women of Pakistan." Poet Kishwar Naheed said in a video, "The next time you make such slogans, remember your culture, your traditions."

Guardian journalist Mehreen Zahra-Malik called some of the backlash frightening; a film student reported that a group of boys sexually harassed her 16-year-old sister online and threatened to rape her for posting support for the march on Instagram. Nighat Dad, photographed with a sign reading "Divorced And Happy", was sexually harassed and threatened with sexual violence. Women participating in the march received threats of physical and sexual violence from social-media users after posting photographs of the posters. According to the Human Rights Commission of Pakistan, about 500 women per year are the victims of honour killings.

On 20 March 2019, the Khyber Pakhtunkhwa Assembly protested against the Aurat March. Muttahida Majlis-i-Amal legislator Rehana Ismail presented a resolution saying that women participating in the march were holding "obscene" placards and calling the marchers' demands for female empowerment "un-Islamic and shameful." After lukewarm opposition, the resolution passed unanimously.

One popular poster called for men to warm their own food; another asked them to find their own socks. A third read, "I'll warm your food but you warm your own bed." Nida Kirmani, a feminist sociologist at the Lahore University of Management Sciences, said that such posters received the harshest reactions because they challenged power in a household. In a New York Times article, Mohammed Hanif said that men in Pakistan who claim to protect women actually guard their own interests; Hanif did not understand how women holding signs could be seen as a threat to the national moral order. According to newspaper editor Sabahat Zakariya, the slogans trigger masculine anxiety.

== Social-media hashtags ==
A social-media hashtag of the 2018 march was #KhaanaKhudGaramKarLo (#Heat your own meal). #WhyIMarch was a hashtag for the 2019 march, with many celebrities, human-rights activists and others sharing their stories with the hashtags #HumAurtein #auratmarch #AuratMarch2019 #JaggaDein. Before the 2020 march, the hashtags #AuratMarch2020 and #MeraJismMeriMarzi appeared on social media.

== 2020 march ==
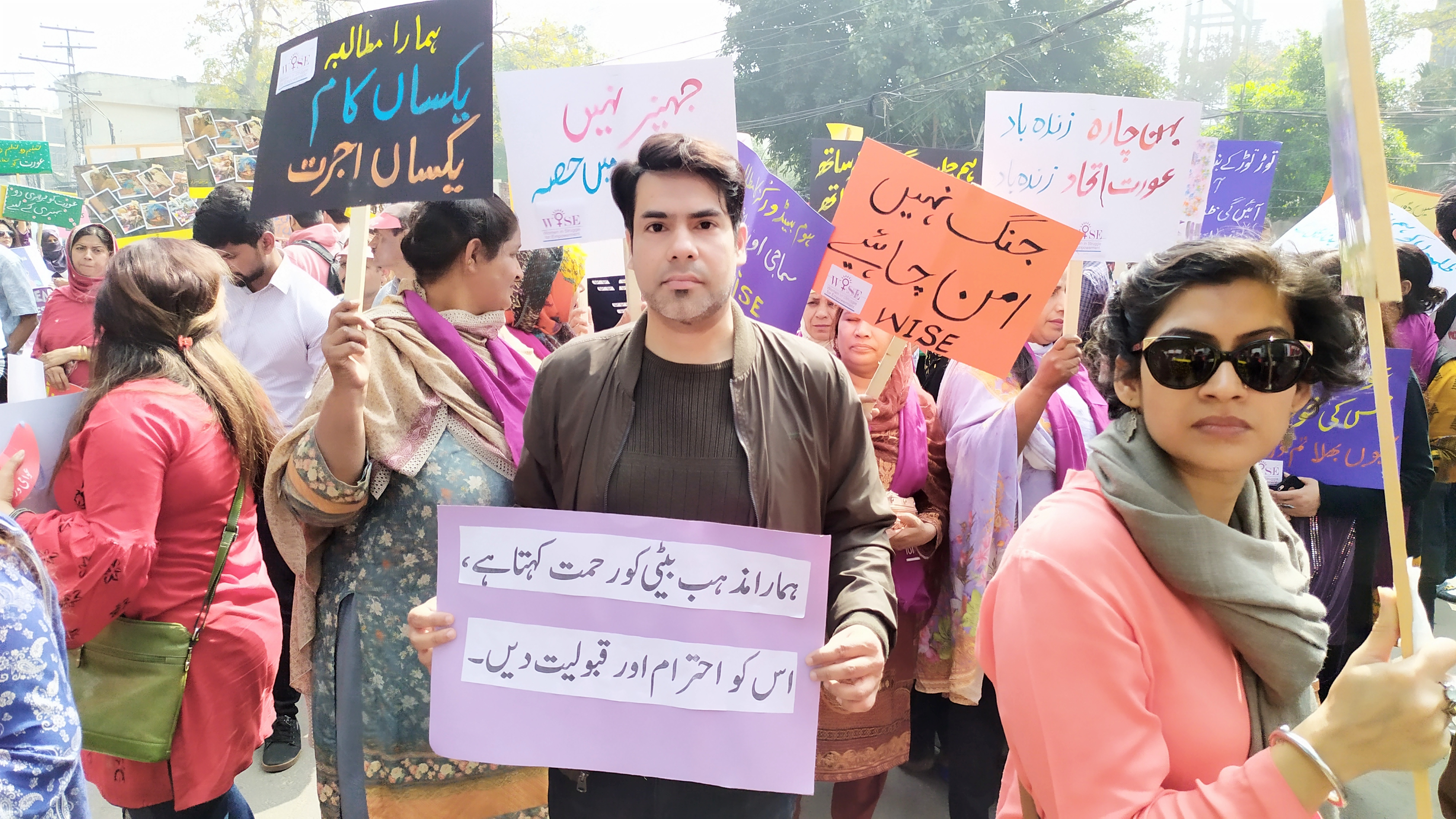
Men joined the 2020 march outside the Lahore Press Club.

The 2020 Aurat March was held on 8 March Karachi, Hyderabad, Lahore and Quetta, and the Aurat Azadi March was held in Islamabad, Sukkur and Multan.

=== Lahore ===
Artist Shehzil Malik began collecting poster-design submissions on 8 March. Participants in the march created a mural of posters submitted by volunteers in Lahore's Hussain Chowk, which was destroyed within hours. Janita Tahir said that march participants were being threatened by conservative men, and the threats needed to be taken seriously.

A petition was filed in the Lahore High Court by the Judicial Activism Council chairman to stop the march, saying that it was "against the very norms of Islam". The petition was rejected by the court's chief justice, who emphasized that freedom of expression could not be banned.

Marchers gathered outside the Press Club and walked along Egerton Road to Aiwan-e-Iqbal. Participants had a number of placards. Despite a social-media storm before the march, many men were present in support. Participants delivered speeches and held placards and banners displaying slogans decrying gender-based violence, misogyny and patriarchy. A resolution was submitted to the Punjab Assembly by Kanwal Liaquat (MPA-PMLN) demanding an end to all forms of gender discrimination and condemning underage marriage.

=== Quetta ===
The Quetta march, which began and ended at the Quetta Press Club, was organized by the Women's Alliance. In addition to social-discrimination issues, the secret installation of cameras in University of Balochistan washrooms and student meeting areas the previous year was highlighted.

=== Performance piece and song ===
"Tum ho rapist", an Urdu version of "A Rapist in Your Path" revised to reflect the Pakistani experience, was performed. Canadian-Pakistani singer Sophia Jamil (also known as Fifi) released her song, "Mera Jism Meri Marzi" ("My Body, My Choice"), on YouTube. Some sang Hum Dekhenge a 1980s protest song against repression.

=== Reaction ===
Sarah Khan on feminism

"Keep man and woman at the place which is designated by Allah ... Don't teach your daughters to do [the] Aurat March; educate your sons ... men should have equal rights too."

— Sarah Khan

The march was again criticized, particularly for its slogans (Mera Jism Meri Marzi in particular), but supporters pointed out the double standard in Pakistani society. Pro- and anti-march sentiments were exchanged in mainstream media, and social media followed suit. #فحاشی_مارچ_نامنظور ("unacceptable, vulgar march") was circulated by a small number of conservative groups, including groups affiliated with the ultra-conservative Tehreek-e-Labaik Pakistan opposed to the march. In April 2019, cleric Jawad Naqvi had called march organizers "the most evil of all women".

Hareem Shah on Aurat March slogans

"..Feminists .. say things like 'Khana Khud Garam Karlo' if you don't want to serve your husband, then you should not get married because your husband is like your God.."

— Hareem Shah (Social media influencer)
Faiqa Mansab on backlash

"..Aurat March..demands were basic..safety..health care..resulted in backlash from Pakistan Taliban..what scares me most is the hidden Taliban in every household.."

— Faiqa Mansab (Feminist author)

Controversy increased before the 2020 march. Ultra-conservatives maintained Islam is already a feminist religion and instead of making additional demands, Muslim women needed to return to a more-modest culture. A haya (modesty) march was organized with the slogan "Our bodies, Allah's choice". Former Prime Minister Nawaz Sharif's Muslim League party (PML-N) did not publicly oppose the Aurat March, but cautioned marchers not to violate Islamic cultural markers. Prime Minister Imran Khan's government, ruled by his Pakistan Tehreek-e-Insaf party (which had yielded to ultra-conservative pressure a month earlier, opposing an Islamabad march), formally supported the march but equated its slogans with national honor. After the march, Khan criticized the inequity of the Pakistani educational system.

The left-of-center Pakistan Peoples Party was more welcoming of the march. PPP Senator Mustafa Nawaz Khokhar accused Khan and his party of considering the ultra-conservative, PML-N and PTI positions a de facto anti-woman alliance. The PPP supported the march unconditionally. Janita Tahir said that Aurat March participants were asking why Khan, a vocal proponent of international human rights, is relatively silent about the half of the Pakistani population which is in a weaker position In her article, Farzana Rasheed asked why Islamic republicanism and freedom are mutually exclusive. Rasheed noted the Khan-conservative alliance's inconsistency in condoning extremist violence while claiming to be a democratic, peaceful nation.

According to Sohail Akbar Warraich, Pakistan's right-wing press aggressively examines the Aurat March for LGBTQ-friendly and pro-choice elements; "not in line with Pakistan's Islamic social fabric" and being "obscene and vulgar", are common conservative dog whistles. Warraich wrote that early in the COVID-19 pandemic, the religious right was in retreat; that phase was short-lived, however, and the government has resumed pressuring women's NGOs (as it had done since the Aurat Marches began).

=== Posters and slogans 2020 ===
The 2020 march's slogans included "Saying 'Mashallah' does not make your harassment halal", "Domestic violence kills more than corona", "I march so one day my daughters won't have to", "Imagine not loving the women in your life enough to advocate for their rights". Men held signs saying, "I am surrounded by the opposite gender and I feel safe. I want the same for them", "Proud husband of a feminist, proud father of a feminist, proud feminist", and "I will be a proud jorru ka Ghulam". Jorru ka Ghulam ("wife's slave") is a pejorative term for a caring husband.

== 2021 march ==
The organizers of the Lahore march decided on "Women's Health Crisis" as its theme to draw attention to the effects of the COVID-19 pandemic on Pakistani women, and selected a poster by Shehzil Malik depicting the health concerns of women due to their environment. The Karachi march organizers staged a sit-in at Frere Hall, with opposition to patriarchal violence its main theme. A manifesto demanded an end of the two-finger test and more female and transgender representation on hospital medico-legal teams. An Aurat Foundation report said that despite continued under-reporting of violence against women and girls, reported cases from 25 Pakistani districts increased to 2,297 in 2020 (during the pandemic). Fifty-seven percent of the cases were in Punjab, and 27 percent were in Sindh. The reported crimes included honor killings, murder, rape, suicide, acid-burning, kidnapping, child and forced marriage, dowries and inheritance. According to Shehzil Malik, Pakistan has Asia's highest rate of breast cancer and 52 percent of women of reproductive age are anemic. The march posters were intended to initiate conversations about a pandemic of toxic patriarchal norms, and the health metaphor highlighted the anguish of structural sexism and exploitation in Pakistani society – a patriarchal society which prioritizes profit over care for Pakistani women face.

Conservatives led by the president of a local trade group in Mardan (a township in the Peshawar region) held a counter-protest before the Aurat March. Firdous Ashiq Awan, special assistant to the chief minister of Punjab, said that the Pakistan Tehreek-e-Insaf government wants to build a society with gender equality and women's rights in line with Islamic principles and values.

On 8 March in Lahore, women wrote their experiences of harassment and discrimination on a "#MeToo blanket"; women in Karachi displayed their laundry, with instances of harassment and discrimination written on them. That year's placards were devoted to gender-based violence, sexual harassment, rape, and female infanticide. #PatriarchykaPandemic (Pandemic of Patriarchy) was a new social-media hashtag. Motivational songs such as "Kurye meray des diye" were performed at the Lahore march and shared on social media. Women in Karachi protested with slogans such as "Jab tak aurat tang rahegi, jang rahegi jang rahegi" ("The struggle will continue until women rise up").

Some slogans evoked popular Bollywood music. One, "Tere liye hee tou signal tor taar ke aaya toxic masculinity chhor chhaar ke" ("I jumped all the red lights for you and gave up my toxic masculinity"), was based on the Hindi song lyric "Tere liye hee tou signal tor taar ke aaya Dilli wali girlfriend chhor chhaar ke" ("I jumped all the red lights for you, leaving my girlfriend back in Delhi"). To the woman holding the sign, a man having friendships with other women was less of a concern than his misogyny would be. Another placard read, "Yunhi koi creep mil gaya tha sare raah chalte chalte" ("A creep showed up while I was on my way").

Ali Gul Pir released the satirical song "Tera Jism, Meri Marzi" ("Your Body, My Choice") in response to critics of the Aurat March slogan. Lyrics such as "Tera Jism, Meri Marzi. Chup aurat achi bolnay waali gandi" ("Your body, my choice; a silent woman is good, and a woman who speaks is bad") and "Aese kesay tune socha sab aesi wesi hain, jesi teri niyat hai, sab dikhti hi wesi hain" ("How did you think that all women are 'like that'? You see women as your intention and motive") expose and question misogyny and patriarchy.

=== Social-media disinformation ===
Although opponents of the Aurat March accused its organizers on social media of flying a French flag, the flag of the Women Democratic Front is red, white, and purple. It was also claimed that the organization supports a foreign agenda and is funded by foreign organizations. Critics of the march reportedly released a doctored video to discredit the movement and expose its supporters to blasphemy charges.

=== Manifestos ===
The social-media campaign and Karachi manifesto focused on violence against women, such as legislation discriminating against women and trans people, acid attacks, and forced disappearances. The Lahore "Feminist Manifesto on Healthcare" called for equal participation in health and medical policymaking, medical research, and medical trials. Other points included concerns about climate change, harassment and violence against female healthcare workers, the elimination of chemical castration as a punishment for rape, and a halt to virginity tests.

== 2022 march ==
Armeena Khan explains the Aurat March

""Aurat March ...is not the complete solution,..only..an important part of a range of actions required. As for privileged and educated women being part of the Aurat March,...Their social position doesn't disqualify them. It's like saying Jinnah shouldn't have marched for the establishment of Pakistan because he was a westernised, educated, privileged man who had little in common with a poor subcontinent Muslim..."

— Armeena Khan quoted in Images The Dawn Date 2022 March 11

Explaining the reason for continuation of Aurat March in 2022, Saman Rizwan says that, in comparison to 2020, the gender gap in Pakistan increased by 0.7 percentage points during the year 2021.

=== Backlash and debates in media and social media ===
According to Hafiz Naeem ur Rehman, the president of Jamat-e-Islami (JI) (a religiously right wing conservative political party) they acknowledge women issues like inadequate wages need for separate public transport for women, but they strongly oppose objectionable slogans in the Aurat March. Maulana Rashid Mehmood Soomro explained Jamiat Ulema-e-Islam (JUI-F)'s objections to those slogans in Aurat March which they think to be contrary to their Islamic ideology and allegedly promote vulgarity. And added threats to stop Aurat March by force if it includes slogans not acceptable to them. According to Mufti Muneeb-ur-Rehman, erstwhile Chairman Ruet-e-Hilal Committee of Pakistan, Islam already provides for rights for women in four corners of Sharia, hence there is no need of women's Aurat March which according to them promotes western culture and agenda. According to Ghazala Shafiq, one of Aurat March organizer, unfair gendered treatment to women and minorities in Pakistan is contrary to constitution of Pakistan therefore Aurat March movement is relevant and Aurat March receive criticism and threats from various right wing factions since Aurat March slogans contain unlikable truths in them.

According to Pakistan's minister for religious affairs and interfaith harmony, Noorul Haq Qadri, Islamic societies are the best in protecting women's rights, Qadri says Aurat March banners, placards and slogans do not match with the Pakistan's social, political and religious standard imbibed in the collective thought of the Pakistani people, and that individual or civil society participating in Aurat March ought not to get leeway to undermine the religious injunctions and instead Aurat March be celebrated as Hijab day to focus discrimination by Hindu extremists against Muslim minorities in India. Later Information Minister Fawad Chaudhry distanced Government of Pakistan saying that governments does not have any right to police people's point of views and clothing. According to Haseeb Hanif, during anti-2022 India (Karnataka) hijab row pro-hijab march held by Pakistan's right wing political party Jamiat Ulema-e-Islam (F) while demanding freedom of choice for Muslim girl students in India, asking whether human rights defenders are blind, the leaders of the JUIF simultaneously termed women's rights demands in Aurat March Pakistan as obscene and in the same voice opposed ensued yearly Aurat March in Pakistan to be held on 8 March 2022 and threatened that shall be stopped by them forcefully with sticks and batons. According to Abbas Nasir Pakistan Tehreek-e-Insaf run government of Pakistan and Jamiat Ulema-e-Islam (F) oppose Aurat March since though may be they are different and competitive political parties, but are united in their deep-seated misogyny and patriarchy. Nasir cites recent (2022) instances including the one instance of tribal retribution in which two young women, were raped and paraded in their village because a couple from their tribe got married of their own choice. Nasir says Pakistan's misogynist and patriarchal clergy fails to understand that Pakistan's women through their Aurat March are not looking for patronizing favour but are striving for legitimate equal rights and freedom from unjust status quo which undermines women's legitimate equal rights and persecution going on since centuries in form of honor killings to molestation, to denial of legitimate right and freedom and respect for their personal choices. Daily Times editorial 'Fear of the Aurat March' says that the federal minister Noorul Haq Qadri is not bringing any constructive contribution to the table by positioning Hijab as an antithesis to a Pakistan wide legitimate women's movement and that Qadri is failing to introspect within while on one hand cherry picking the predicament of some Muslim women, on the other hand Qadri seems to condone all unfortunate goes right underneath his watch is very unbecoming of both as a state representative as well as a leading voice of religion. The Daily Times author Aliya Anjum's article title advices men to have Hijab Day for themselves and points out right to public space for women according to Hadith literature. The Daily Times also says that there are too many women's issues which need attention of Pakistan authorities as well as society still the editorial believes Aurat March should prefer less controversial slogans. According to Farah Khwaja as evident from foreboding disheartened responses of Pakistani men to Aurat March, which are predisposed for continuation of moral policing on clothing choices of Pakistani women in public spaces and are ready to contend whether or not those comply to their orthodox hunch of 'modesty'. Khwaja says the simple steps of women marching unitedly demanding for their fundamental rights leads to so much backlash and hate in Pakistan. Possibly the same men who are asking for rights to wear Hijab in other nations should also amplify their voices when women's rights are undermined in Pakistan itself. Farah Khwaja says while Pakistanis slam other nations for their drawbacks, they also ought to take notice of how Pakistan as a nation is failing its own women and religious minorities.

Pakistan's senator Sherry Rehman said that on one hand Pakistanis are condemning Indian attitude and on other hand conspiring to ban unarmed women's march in Pakistan and denying Pakistani women of their freedom and rights on International Women's Day itself. According to Safia Bano as Aurat March date comes near hostility and trolling begins, Pakistani women's demands in manifesto are disregarded instead focus is lead towards few banners because demands regarding day today problems do not make interesting news. According to the Dawn Images dated 19 February 2022; many users on social media criticized Noorul Haq Qadri for inexpedient attempts to divert attention from legitimate demands for rights by women of Pakistan. The International News in its editorial says that while in high-profile case of Noor Mukadam justice has been served, women of Pakistan deserve consistency in justice, and the editorial points out same time Qandeel Baloch's brother is acquitted and religious affairs minister also orthodox politicians of JUI-F are talking against organizing of Aurat March.

=== Marches amidst intimidation and attacks ===
According to the Dawn Images dated 9th March, negative misinformation campaigns against Aurat March along with WhatsApp messages urging family elders to restrict their family women from participating in Aurat March proved to be an impediment for many women. According to The Friday Times News Desk, during organization of 2022 International Women's Days Marches in Pakistan's various cities, at some places Marches had to be ended early due to pressure tactics by government administration, police and judiciary were not cooperative enough and intimidating attacks by conservative opposing religious and political groups. District administration of Islamabad reportedly mislead desirous attendees about venue of March, ordered participants to disperse, threatened operators of sound system and even switched off microphones of participating women. Reportedly in a hate speech, a religio political leader in the counter protest rally at Islamabad publicly prayed for same fate for Aurat March participants as of a murdered victim Noor Mukaddam sans any action from police against the hate speech. According to news reports in Friday Times, Daily Time and The Dawn, in Lahore authorities ultimately provided some protection but seemed not keen enough in providing requisite protection and security to the Aurat March. Aurat March women marched through Lahore's Egerton Road sloganeering and holding banners and posters in their hand demanding inclusivity, equal rights, security for women. According to Daily Times news report approximately 2000 women attended 2022 Lahore Aurat March. At the starting point march organizers staged exhibit called 'Journalism Must Be Ethical', made of cardboard cutouts depicting those kind of media journalist who said to have misrepresented or misreported Aurat March, harassed marching women or posted images of the marchers with clickbait intention. The cut-outs were holding banners quoting the journalists they had said or represented and a QR code to access the alleged misinformation spread by them. News report of Sanniah Hassan for Baghi TV expressed apprehension saying such inclusion of cutouts jeopardizes legitimate interests of their and other journalists. At the end of Aurat March Lahore women sang feminist songs like 'Rapist Ho Tum' and Tappay songs in classical folklore form with feminist overtones. And at the exit of the march some of the participant's kurtas were displayed inscribed with ages when they were harassed and their relation with the harasser. A counter-protests claiming to protect of Islamic values, called women's "hijab marches", were also taken out by in Lahore similar to the ones in Karachi and Islamabad. According to The Friday Times, despite some barricades maintained by police In Lahore, 'Haya March' (Morality March), passed in close proximity of mere 200 meters and men from Haya March attacked women in Aurat March and authorities asked women of Aurat March to close their march abruptly.

=== 2022 Manifestos ===
Aurat March Lahore has made 17 demands through its 2022 manifesto. The 2022 Lahore manifesto theme talks of focus on 'Asal Insaaf' i.e. 'True Justice' which wishes structural revision of the state and society's conception of justice and addressing systemic inadequacies, expresses concern over discriminatory towards gender and ethnic minorities in the Pakistan's judiciary and excessive focus on carceral punishment to combat crime. The 2022 Lahore manifesto demand includes more financial support to 'survivor-centric' welfare organizations, universal basic income and care work income for all, decriminalisation of defamation laws. While the Lahore manifesto expressed concerns over compromising of individual privacy and liberty through 'safe city project' (which provides for China like integrated monitoring of public places with 3D CCTV cameras), the demand came for criticism claiming safe city project is likely to benefit for safety of women in public places.

2022 Aurat March Karachi 'Mehnatkash Aurat Rally' ('working women's rally') manifesto makes various demands for women in unorganized sector including security, minimum wages and also asks improved provisions for Women's shelter homes with 'peace, bread and equality' as main slogan.

== 2023 march ==
The 2023 marches in Hyderabad, Ghotki, Lahore, Islamabad and Multan were held on 8 March, while the march in Karachi it held on the 12.

== 2024 march ==
The 2024 marches were held on 8 March in major cities of Pakistan including Karachi, Lahore and Islamabad with major emphasis on economical justice for women, end of gender-based violence against women, enforced disappearances in Pakistan and world peace.

== 2025 march ==
The 2025 Aurat March took place on 8 March in Islamabad.

== 2026 march ==
On 5 May 2026, when Aurat March activists gathered around the Karachi Press Club for a press conference demanding a No Objection Certificate (NOC) for the anticipated 2026 march, seven of the activists, including Sheema Kermani and Shahzadi Rai, were briefly detained by the police. Kermani was forcefully removed from her car and taken away in a police vehicle. The activists were detained at the Aram Bagh police station for one hour. About four organizers managed to evade police women and managed to reached the conference hall where they revealed that their activist friends were detained despite the fact that section 144 didn't apply to press conferences. Najma Maheshwari, an activist, revealed mistreatment by the police, including use of "filthy language" and "abuse." The Human Rights Commission of Pakistan (HRCP) strongly condemned the arrest and detention of activists, organisers, and volunteers of Aurat March Karachi. The commission asserted that the incident was part of a "deeply troubling pattern" involving the denial of public space to people asserting their rights.

== Impact ==
According to Moneeza Ahmed, the Aurat March's primary benefit is to initiate a nationwide dialogue about women's-rights issues; feminism has become part of mainstream discourse in Pakistan. Ahmed says that the march has brought discussion of issues of consent and bodily and sexual autonomy to the forefront. Ahmed and Ajwah say that women-related laws have much room for improvement, and the Aurat March increases the pressure for change; the reporting of institutional Me Too issues and awareness of issues such as the two-finger test has improved. According to Dr. Nida Kirmani though incidences like a TikTok creator woman getting sexually assaulted in precincts of Pakistan's prominent national monument the Minar-e-Pakistan in Lahore on Pakistan's (2021) Independence Day exposes rife violence against women, such gender-based violence is not new in Pakistan but getting more media and social media attention and this has not limited in the virtual realm for example, after the Minar-e-Pakistan incident, young women and men held demonstrations on the same place where the Tik Toker lady had been assaulted a week before, in an attempt to manifest women's right to be present in public spaces. According to Neelam Yousaf, irrespective of one agrees or hates, Aurat March is having revolutionary impact and is succeeding in initiating a conversation and consciousness around women's rights in Pakistan and Pakistani women are striving to achieve equal rights.

== Academic studies ==
According to Lorna Stevens, Olga Kravets, Pauline Maclaran, Aurat March started since 2018 International Women's Day is now an annual protest in Pakistan. As per linguistic analysis of Abgeena Riaz Khan, Aziz Ahmad, Rab Nawaz Khan, Usman Shah and Itbar Khan, the phrase "aurat march," contains an Urdu word along with English morpheme is an example of Intra-Sentential Switching. Ina Goel classifies Aurat March as integral part of global Fourth-wave feminism. According to Malik Afzal, Muhamad Pakri, Nurul Abdullah (2021), the narrative of honour and decency is used by centers of patriarchal powers in Pakistan to suppress the narrative of women's empowerment that emancipate in the form of the Aurat March in Pakistan. Pakistani woman needs to be accepted as woman and orthodox thought in Pakistan about female body is due for reexamination.

== See also ==
- All Pakistan Women's Association
- Aurat Foundation
- Blue Veins
- Feminism in Pakistan
- Girls at Dhabas
- Me Too movement (Pakistan)
- Mera Jism Meri Marzi
- Musawah
- Pakistan Federation of Business and Professional Women
- Rape in Pakistan
- Violence against women in Pakistan
- Women in Islam
- Women in Pakistan
- Women related laws in Pakistan
- Women's Action Forum
- Women's Protection Bill
- Women's rights
- Women's liberation movement in Asia

== Bibliography ==
- Mehreen Qaisar, Contemporary Pakistani women's movement and dilemma of the Pakistani society. (November 2021) Conference: Gender And Women's Studies '21 – VI. International Interdisciplinary Conference On Gender And Women'S Studies Proceedings at: İstanbul (Turkey), Women's Leadership Programmes: A Path to Positive Thinking?
- Khan, Ayesha. The Women's Movement in Pakistan: Activism, Islam and Democracy. United Kingdom, Bloomsbury Publishing, 2018.
- Feminism, Postfeminism and Legal Theory: Beyond the Gendered Subject?. United Kingdom, Taylor & Francis, 2018.
- Shaikh-Farooqui, Amneh. Fearless: Stories of Amazing Women from Pakistan. India, Penguin Random House India Private Limited, 2020.
- From Terrorism to Television: Dynamics of Media, State, and Society in Pakistan. Milton Park: Taylor & Francis, 2020.
- Chapter 5 Pakistan: Digital Justice, Ed.:Vogelstein, Rachel B., and Stone, Meighan. Work: Awakening: #MeToo and the Global Fight for Women's Rights. United States, PublicAffairs, 2021.
- "The Aurat March" – Shama Dosa (chapter 23), Routledge Handbook of Gender in South Asia. Milton Park: Taylor & Francis, 2021.
- Chapter 12, A Cartographic Journey of Race, Gender and Power: Global Identity. United Kingdom, Cambridge Scholars Publishing, 2021.
- Afzal, Malik Haroon; Pakri, Muhamad Rashidi Mohd; and Abdullah, Nurul Farhana Low (2021). Is Women's Empowerment a Thucydides' Trap for Patriarchy in Pakistan? The Aurat (Woman) March-2020 and Bina Shah's Before She Sleeps. Journal of International Women's Studies, 22(9), 111–127
- Daanika R. Kamal, Networked Struggles: Placards at Pakistan's Aurat March, Feminist Legal Studies, (15 December 2021). https://doi.org/10.1007/s10691-021-09480-4'
- Aaisha Salman. "The West and the Feminist: Contemporary Feminist Activism in Pakistan and the Politics of National Culture ". Kohl: a Journal for Body and Gender Research Vol. 8 No. 1 (24 January 2022): pp. 52–66. (Last accessed on 12 March 2022). Available at: https://kohljournal.press/west-and-feminist
- Shirin Zubair, Mera Jism Meri Marzi: Framing the contestations of Women's Rights in Pakistan, pp 307–325 in 'Global Contestations of Gender Rights Ed.: Alexandra Scheele, Julia Roth, Heidemarie Winke' ISBN 9783837660692 Publishers: Bielefeld University Press
- Sonia Mukhtar, Shamim Mukhtar, Waleed Rana, A Public Health Perspective of "My Body, My Choice" in Aurat March of Pakistan: A Crisis of Marital Rape During COVID-19 Pandemic, January 18, 2022, Sage Journals https://doi.org/10.1177/10105395211072500
