= 2021 Minar-e-Pakistan mass sexual assault =

2021 crime in Lahore, Pakistan

On 14 August 2021, Ayesha Akram, a social media celebrity, was sexually assaulted by a crowd at Minar-e-Pakistan, Lahore, Pakistan. In a video recording of the incident that went viral days later, the crowd was seen picking up the woman, throwing her up in the air between them, tearing off her clothes, and assaulting and groping her.

The incident caused widespread outrage in Pakistan, with the Amnesty International and many of Pakistan's prominent figures expressing their outrage and disgust over the assault.

The victim would later state that her partner had preplanned the incident. This resulted in a shift of public opinion regarding the case.

== Incident ==
Ayesha Akram, a nurse by profession and freelance TikToker and YouTube vlogger, was attacked, molested, and looted, along with her team members, by a large crowd in the evening of 14 August 2021. The incident took place on the 75th independence anniversary of Pakistan in the precincts of Minar-e-Pakistan near Greater Iqbal Park. According to reports, the situation lasted from 6:30 p.m. to 8:40 p.m. According to sources, the meet-up event with fans was planned by the victim Ayesha Akram herself along with her team of TikTokers. In her first information report, Akram stated that she and her six companions were shooting a video near the monument when the mob of around 300 to 400 people surrounded and attacked them. Akram was quoted as saying "the crowd was huge and people were scaling the enclosure and coming towards us". She stated that she and her companions tried as hard as they could to escape from the crowd. Observing the situation, the park's security guard opened the gate to the enclosure around Minar-e-Pakistan. Akram said that the men broke and jumped over the fence, surged towards her, and started pulling on her. She said that as they grasped her, they tore off her clothes and tossed her into the air. She explained that some men tried to help her, but the crowd was overwhelmingly large and they were unable to do anything at that moment.

Akram additionally said that the mob of men forcefully took off her gold ring and gold earrings, along with assaulting a friend of hers and snatching his cellphone, along with Rs. 15,000. The police could not respond to calls in time and spectators of the event were unable to help.

According to team leader Zaman Qureshi of the first response police team of the Dolphin Force, they themselves had to rescue Akram, of whom they found in a very vulnerable condition. Their team had to provide her with drinking water and a shirt to cover herself, since her clothes were torn apart by the instigators.

== Reactions ==
The incident caused widespread outrage in Pakistan, with Amnesty International and many of Pakistan's prominent figures expressing their outrage and disgust over the assault. Amnesty stated that it was "alarmed by the assault of a woman in Lahore in broad daylight on 14 August", explaining that "at a time when the country is reeling from the murder of Noor Mukadam and Qurat ul Ain, [the] episode compounds the horror even more."

=== Celebrity reactions ===
Many celebrities took to social media to express outrage and ask higher-ups to serve justice to Akram, with some left completely stunned over the perceived audacity of the perpetrators.

- Pakistani religious conservative scriptwriter Khalil-ur-Rehman Qamar said he concedes that "a woman's honour and dignity isn't safe in [Pakistan]", does "not know who to blame", and is attempting to "understand the mental level and state of mind of the 400 men present there."
- Mahira Khan said she couldn't "believe what [she] just saw", stating "I've said it before and I will say it again - make an example out of these men!"
- Yashma Gill argued that "even if I say that she supposedly planted three or four men, and the rest of the men just followed suit, then sure, she planted them, but don't those men have free will? They had the power to choose right from wrong, and they chose wrong. So they are to be blamed as well. You can't keep victim-blaming only."
- Actor Mansha Pasha said "we preach religion and patriotism here but we follow hedionism and barbarism", stating in a follow-up tweet that "this whole drama of why was she there and what was she wearing is getting really old and noone [sic] is buying it anymore."
- Vlogger Shaheer Jaffery commented on the incident through a series of Tweets, stating "the truth is, it doesn't matter what the educated Twitter class thinks or says. The majority of people are just trolls and would see what happened as 'just'!", adding in another Tweet "we'd defend our sisters and daughters to the point that we can lay our lives for them. However, some random girl passing by is an opportunity to harass. There's a disconnect in empathy. In feeling for another human. We don't care much about each other." Jaffery also added "the girl screams for help as she's groped by hundreds of men. There is Azaan going on in the background. I'm finding it hard to wrap my head around that scenario."
- Pakistani comedian Ali Gul Pir said that "If we accept [the theory] that she went for a TikTok meeting, if we accept [the theory] that the guy with her was her boyfriend, and we accept that the next day she posted a picture in which she looked happy, even if we accept all that, all your theories, what those 400 men did was wrong, was a crime and was horrible."

=== Political reactions ===
- The President of Pakistan, Dr. Arif Alvi, said it was "regretful" that people opted to film the harassment at the Minar-e-Pakistan incident instead of forbidding the wrongdoers. He also explained that he believed it was equally essential to teach society proper ethics and responsibilities. He went on to state: "The whole society needs to learn to provide women the space which is needed for security."
- Maryam Nawaz stated on Twitter that "[the] heart-wrenching scenes at Minar-e-Pakistan warrant collective introspection. We as parents, teachers and leaders need to reflect upon the upbringing of our youngsters to make public spaces safe for women. Those involved must be dragged to justice to create deterrence for future [sic]."
- Prime Minister Imran Khan said he was "ashamed" and "pained" by the assault. He referred to what he perceived as a lack of proper upbringing of children's greater exposure to events due to mobile phones. He called for the need to teach children the Seerat-un-Nabi — biographies of Muhammad. Minister for Human Rights Shireen Mazarisaid stated that "certainly effective implementation of our laws will have some deterrent effect but mindsets also have to change to stop crimes against all vulnerable mbrs [sic] of our society."
- The Leader of the Opposition in the National Assembly, Shehbaz Sharif, stated, "What is more worrying is the direction our society is headed in. The recent anti-women incidents are a reminder that malaise is deep-rooted. Very Shameful!"
- Pakistan People's Party chairperson Bilawal Bhutto Zardari said in a tweet: "The assault of a young women [sic] by a mob at #minarepakistan should shame every Pakistani. It speaks to a rot in our society. Those responsible must be brought to justice. The women of Pakistan feel insecure and it is all our responsibility to ensure safety and equal rights to all."

=== Other reactions ===
- Karachi-based lawyer and human rights activist Jibran Nasir expressed concerns about the "widespread victim-blaming on social media", stating: "Why are crimes committed against a man seen as an exception despite his own conduct but crimes against a woman is considered a natural outcome of her actions?"
- Some conservatives took the opportunity to criticise the feminist slogan Mera Jism Meri Marzi, whereas many feminists media columns such as Soha Nisar claimed continued headlines like the Minar-e-Pakistan incident showed that "a majority of the dominant patriarchal sex is still apathetic to its meaning. [...] Today, I have finally understood why the slogan 'Mera Jism Meri Marzi' is so important. Until and unless women don't take ownership of their bodies, they can never get liberated from men."
- Global concern over the incident caused many people to question why Pakistan was seemingly unable to provide a "safe environment" for women against sexual violence, even at its national monument and during a national holiday.

=== Protests ===
Prominent organisations, like Aurat March supporters, Tehreek-e-Niswan, Aurat Foundation, Human Rights Commission of Pakistan, Women Action Forum, War Against Rape, and Sindh Commission of the Status of Women took part in protests in Karachi and Lahore.

== Debate in media and social media ==
The rapid increase in cases of violence against women provoked a debate about the failure to protect women in Pakistan, examining the culture of impunity for perpetrators and the reasons behind society's perceived tendency to restrain women's independence and inflict pain on them. In a video interview given to Deutsche Welle, journalist Arzoo Kazmi commented that following Akram's assault, Pakistani society was sliding back into regressive, "conservative" policies like those of the Zia-ul-Haq era, noting how restrictions on women's freedom of movement and education lead to disrespectful behavior towards women in public places. Many politicians and public figures, including activists, celebrities, and members of civil society, condemned the incident on social and mainstream media. Mehmil Khalid Kunwar quoted a report by the advocacy group Sustainable Social Development Organisation (SSDO), noting 6,754 women were kidnapped and 1,890 raped in the first six months of 2021 in Punjab province alone, but the rate of reporting in media of these events remained low. Kunwar says the low publicity of such incidents makes women feel more vulnerable about their security and protection in social settings. The hashtags "Minar-e-Pakistan", "Lahore incident" and "400 men, yes all men" trended on social media. "#YesAllMen" trended, in refutation to the phrase "not all men" that is frequently used by men in response to incidents of sexual violence against women in Pakistan. Some sectors of Pakistani society said the victim and her friend had invited fans and that her boldness displayed in her TikTok videos contributed to the incident. Some, using the hashtag "#NotAllMen", said the assault was a publicity stunt organised by Akram. A court case against Akram was filed to that effect, but the court rejected the petition. The Prime Minister of Pakistan at the time, Imran Khan, blamed the incident on the availability of smartphones. His remarks made many critics of Khan recall a previous statement from June 2021, stating that "...if a woman is wearing very few clothes it will have an impact on the men unless they are robots... If you raise temptation in society to a point – and all these young guys have nowhere to go – it has a consequence in the society". He was criticised for suggesting that an increase in sexual violence was related to how women dress and behave. Other sectors of the media criticised these explanations as victim-blaming. According to Salman Akram Raja (a prominent supreme court advocate in Pakistan), far from Pakistan's argued superior local cultural upbringing, with its profound offerings of decency, the mobsters at Minar-e-Pakistan lost their self-restraint, religious or other, which would have expected them to protect the confined woman, or even any TikToker. Raja said that the reactions across electronic, print and social media platforms that rapidly transformed the helpless hurled around, stripped body of the molested woman to slut shame woman saying "The boys must be punished but the woman asked for it.", claiming the victim to be an attention-seeking conspirator against Pakistan. Raja said a cursory study of Muttahida Ulema Board approved Single National Curriculum textbooks since 2020 indicated that girls and women in hijab or purdah who would not seek to enjoy freedoms like music and singing have become the resumed standard of the idealised 'good woman/child' and that the assaulted woman at Minar-e-Pakistan failed that norm.

According to Kamila Hyat of The News International, certain people argued that Akram was responsible for provoking the violence against herself, perhaps by blowing kisses to some of her fans, whom she invited to the event; by posing for selfies with people in her group; or by allowing the young man who had accompanied her to put an arm around her shoulder. Hyat said the fact that the victim did not consent to being groped, hustled, thrown into the air, squeezed, and almost rendered unconscious is "evident". Actress Yashma Gill explained that since men have the free will and power to choose right from wrong, the victim is blameless. According to journalist Rajaa Moini, Akram was physically assaulted and faced exceedingly negative scrutiny because for many Pakistanis, her visibility on TikTok – freely accessing "digital freedoms" – was construed to mean that she had questionable morals, which validated the attack to prevent cultural degradation. Moini said that enabling and justifying violence, specifically against women, often involved the weaponisation of their personal information.

Vlogger Maria Amir noted that having video evidence go viral on social media is not beneficial to the victim of the situation, but is often the only way to attract public attention and assemble enough indignation to motivate authorities to take action. She also argues that viral videos have also been effective in persuading Pakistani men that violence against women is both "real and deadly". According to Muhammad Moiz, a global policy practitioner, while TikTok and Instagram – as well as the increased visibility they provide – are newer technology, women, as well as those who "chastise them for engaging in acts of self-expression and pleasure" have become highly prominent in social media. Moiz and Shmyla Khan, activists for digital privacy and online gender expression, note that digital media simply imports "preexisting power structures" to social media platforms, creating "more tools to commit violence with".

Moini noted that gendered treatment of the word azad holds "a unique place in the Urdu lexicon, inspiring equal levels of reverence, pride, and in the context of women, utter hostility and revulsion." In Pakistan, azad mulk (a free country) is, as stated by Moini, cause for "celebration and revelry", yet azad aurat (a free woman) "is met with accusations of cultural degradation, an active threat to the nation at best, and a justification for barbaric violence against her at worst". Amir concurred, pointing out the powerful symbolisation of how Pakistanis have "twisted the very meaning of 'independence' and 'freedom' to cater solely to one gender at the expense of another." Media and feminists also questioned and expressed outrage over harassment against women in another set of seven cases in and around Lahore since the Minar-e-Pakistan incident, including the harassment of a woman traveling by rickshaw in Lahore on pre-Independence Day evening, a man removing his pants to taunt a woman in another, and the mockery of Pakistani actress Mehwish Hayat's Independence Day message by discussing the colour of her bra beneath her traditional Kurta top. Journalist Anmol Irfan reflected on the irony that most media interviews of the victims were by male journalists who seemingly did not receive the same kinds of threats.

== Medicolegal examination ==
A medical examination of Akram was conducted at the Nawaz Sharif Teaching Hospital on 19 August 2021. On 20 August 2021, the Punjab government issued the medical examination report of Akram which confirmed details of her injuries after being assaulted. According to a medicolegal report, she was found to have dozens of bruises and scratches on the body including her chest, waist, legs and elbow, plus inflammation on the neck and hands.

== Police investigation ==
=== Initial investigation ===
Punjab police formed four special teams for investigating the assault. They sent 30 videos and 60 photographs to Pakistan's national database for identification. They also geo-fenced 28,000 people by examining call records made between 6:30 and 7:47 p.m. on 14 August. They shortlisted 350 suspects, two of whom qualified for pre-arrest bail. The police initially arrested 161 suspects; however, as the victims could only identify six of them in an identification parade, the police had released 155 of the suspects by 7 September.

One pending case challan nominated six suspects, with the other challan nominating 11 suspects, of whom included men and teenage boys; the case was scheduled to come before court on 6 September 2022. A sessions court led by Ishrat Abbas issued non bailable warrants against seven non-appearing suspects, additionally rescheduling the hearing to 30 September 2022. Prosecution attorneys expressed concern over the considerable delay, which was taking place due to defendant objections.

=== October arrests ===
On 8 October 2021, police announced that they had arrested eight suspects and charged them with assaulting Akram on 14 August. Among the eight arrested was one of her associates. Akram accused the associate of masterminding the incident. She further accused him of recording videos of her and blackmailing her for money, stating that she had already paid her associate 1 million in extortion costs. The suspects' families protested against their arrests outside of the police station.

The associate's lawyer denied the allegations and demanded bail for the associate on the basis that the police had completed the questioning and that Akram had allegedly given conflicting statements. The prosecution maintained that the associate was guilty and opposed the granting of bail. However, on 7 February 2022, the associate was granted bail by the Lahore High Court, subject to surety bonds of Rs. 100,000.

== Accusations of pre-planning ==
Akram nominated 13 suspects to the police including a member of her team 'Amir Sohail'. She alleged that Amir had pre planned the incident against her. Moreover, she also accused him of recording vulgar videos of her before the incident and that he had used these videos to blackmail her and that he and his 'tiktok gang' had extorted a million rupees from her. An audio clip was found by police which confirmed the allegations of blackmailing against Rambo. There were allegations that Ayesha herself had planned this incident for publicity. The statement by a security guard at the scene claims that Ayesha had a chance to escape but she remained at the site despite being warned. During police investigation an alleged plot surfaced between Ayesha and Rambo to extort money from the suspects.

== Impact and legacy ==
The delayed police response led to suspensions and transfers of some of the concerned police officials in Lahore. According to DIG Investigator Shariq Jamal Khan, a 300% rise in the registration of sexual assault cases was observed in Lahore within one and a half months of the case. Jamal Khan said that sexual assault cases happened in Lahore prior to the incident, but the event seemed to have "given women the confidence to stand up" and register first information reports against crimes more confidently.Some cases were discarded after they turned out to be false. At the end of 2021, media in Pakistan, namely Dawn, The News International, Geo TV, and Aaj TV, counted the Minar-e-Pakistan incident of 14 August as one of the most talked about incidents of assault against women in Pakistan.

== See also ==
- Violence against women in Pakistan
- Mass sexual assault
- Mera Jism Meri Marzi
- Dolphin Force
