= Feminism in Pakistan =

Feminism in Pakistan refers to the movements which aim to define, establish, and defend the rights of women in Pakistan. This may involve the pursuit of equal political, economic, and social rights, alongside equal opportunity. These movements have historically been shaped in response to the national and global reconfiguration of power in the country, including colonialism, nationalism, Islamization, dictatorship, democracy, and the war on terror. The relationship between the women's movements and the Pakistani state has undergone significant shifts from mutual accommodation to confrontation and conflict.

== Background ==
The situation of women in Pakistan has been described to "confound easy categorization". For several generations women have been allowed to attend university and hold jobs, but there is still common gender-based violence and a widespread societal conception of women as property who should not have an existence outside the domestic sphere.

According to the Global Gender Gap report of the World Economic Forum (WEF), Pakistan's parity score in the Economic Participation and Opportunity subindex is 36.2%, one of the lowest scores world-wide. Pakistan has a ranking of 142 of 146 countries overall. According to UNICEF, 54% of Pakistani girls become pregnant before their 18th birthday, and 46% of girls are not in education, employment or training. The International Monetary Fund has estimated that raising women's economic productivity and growth to that of men could boost Pakistan's GDP by 30 percent.

According to writer Zoya Rehman, the image of Pakistani womanhood has been a construction of the Pakistani state since its inception, heavily influenced by colonialism and Pakistan's establishment as an Islamic nation. After independence, the government used religious right-wing sexism as a tool to gain popular support. Within this perception, Pakistani women are controlled, denigrated, and expected to guard their sexuality. They can be subject to "honor"-based violence when they do not meet cultural expectations.

Usman Quais argues that honor killings as well as other forms of gender based and sexual violence today are linked to and made worse by systemic barriers: lack of education, poverty, disrupted judicial system, and governmental negligence, which were exacerbated by years of colonial conflicts. Afiya S. Ziya argues that this cultural orthodoxy is maintained by propaganda produced by the Inter-Services Public Relations, a Pakistani government agency, that purports to define what is legitimate and permissible as Pakistani culture.

Women in Pakistan have advocated for women's political empowerment through reform legislation. The Muslim Personal Law of Sharia, which recognized a woman's right to inherit all forms of property, was passed in 1948 after activists mobilized support. There was an unsuccessful attempt include a Charter of Women's Rights in the 1956 constitution. The most important socio-legal reform to be driven by feminist movements in Pakistan, 1961 Muslim Family Laws Ordinance covering marriage and divorce, is still widely regarded as empowering to women.

Women from minority religions face a particularly severe lack of protections. The UN has expressed dismay at the continuing legal disregard for women in the Christian and Hindu communities against forced religious conversion, abduction, trafficking, child, early and forced marriage, domestic servitude and sexual violence.

== History ==
According to Maliha Zia, while there are strong movements for women's equality and non-discrimination, there is no over-encompassing feminist movement. Zia divides the history of feminist movements in Pakistan into three phases: the first one beginning in 1947, the second one in the period after the Zia-ul-Haq dictatorship ended in 1988, and the third one since 9/11.

=== First phase: 1947–1952 ===
Muslim women were some of the most affected victims of Partition; it is reported that 75,000 women were abducted and raped during this period. Soon after, Fatima Jinnah formed the Women's Relief Committee, which later evolved into the All Pakistan Women's Association. Jinnah later founded a secret radio station, and, in 1965, came out of her self-imposed political retirement to participate in the presidential election against military dictator Ayub Khan.

Begum Ra'na Liaquat Ali Khan helped the refugees who fled India during partition and organized the All Pakistan Women's Association in 1949, two years after the creation of her country. Noticing that there were not many nurses in Karachi, Khan requested the army to train women to give injections and first aid, therefore allowing women to be in para-military forces. Nursing became a career path for many girls. Khan continued her mission, even after her husband was assassinated in 1951, and became the first female Muslim delegate to the United Nations in 1952.

According to Ayesha Khan, in the initial decades after independence, women's leadership was largely elite and invested in Muslim nationalism, striving for limited rights for women. Women in civil society came into confrontation with the government when dictatorial Islamization started limiting their rights.

=== Second phase: 1980s ===
When the military dictatorial regime of Muhammad Zia-ul-Haq gained power, they initiated the Islamisation of Pakistan. These reforms replaced parts of the British-era Pakistan Penal Code, making adultery and fornication criminal offenses, and introducing the punishments of whipping, amputation, and stoning to death. The feminist movement in Pakistan highly opposed this implementation of Islam, which they believed to be based on an archaic understanding of Islamic literature, asking instead for liberal modernist interpretation. After much controversy and criticism, parts of the law were considerably revised by the 2006 Women's Protection Bill.

In this context, the vocal Women's Action Forum (WAF) was formed in 1981. According to Madihah Akhter, General Zia ultimately sought to morally police the role of women in the public sphere, which brought unexpected pressure on Pakistani women. As a reaction to the form of Zia's Islamization, many Pakistani women, including writers, academics, and performers, became active in the opposition of these policies. Akhter argued that the younger generation of 1980s activists were more feminist in their outlook and approach; the Women's Action Forum, she says, used "progressive interpretations of Islam" to counter the state's implementation of religiously interpreted morality, and in doing so, gained the unexpected support of right wing Islamic women's organizations. They campaigned through various mediums such as newspaper articles, art, poetry, and song.

=== After Zia: 1988–2008 ===
After the end of General Zia's rule, Pakistan elected its first female prime minister, Benazir Bhutto. Under her administration, all-women police stations were founded and female judges were appointed for the first time. However, many anti-feminist laws of the General Zia era remained.

In the post-Zia era, activists have been able to produce research that has focused on strengthening the political voice of women and promoting inclusive democratic governance. They have also produced some of the first Pakistani research and awareness-raising material on the sexual and reproductive rights of women, environmental issues, and citizen-based initiatives for peace between India and Pakistan.

=== 2008–2017 ===
This was a period when the People's Party of Pakistan (PPP) was attained political stability within the country and was able to avoid economic decline. The PPP held all parts of government, the president, the prime minister, and the speaker. It became the first party to hold a 5-year term, and add a constitutional amendment that decentralized governmental power. This comes from the party's belief that the central government had been overpowering local governments but the PPP remained in opposition to the socialist leftist movement of Muttahida Qaumi Movement/MQM. This was also a time period where more women of different backgrounds were getting involved in the mainstream political spear. Good number of women related laws were passed in between 2008 to 2012. Elections Act, 2017 expects minimum 10% women voter turn out per constituency otherwise election commission has powers to declare lesser women turn out election to be void. This law besides on field efforts by NGO 'Women in Struggle for Empowerment (WISE)' founded by Bushra Khaliq, helped improve women voter participation to some extent.

More women from marginalized and low-caste statuses were politically organizing. There was still a general lack of attention to women's rights by all mainstream political parties.

Sharmeen Obaid-Chinoy

Sharmeen Obaid-Chinoy is a documentarian and a filmmaker who seeks to tell the stories of marginalized voices in her community. Obaid-Chinoy has worked all over the world to tell the stories of survivors who have not been given a platform. One of her most notable films "Saving Face" details the experiences of Pakistani women who have survived acid attacks and their processes of physical and social recovery. She won an Oscar for this project and helped raise awareness of the realities faced by these survivors. She also produced a film about honor killings,"A Girl in the River: The Price of Forgiveness" from the perspective of a rare survivor. This film reached the prime minister who was inspired to pass a law that ended a loop-hole within the legal system for honor killings. Her story telling is closely tied with activism; she believes that movies have more power in places where literacy rates are low. She explains, "[b]y bringing the voices of the ordinary people faced with extraordinary challenges to television screens around the world, I hope to affect change in one community at a time". Thus Obaid-Chinoy also participates in hands-on activist efforts by running a movie truck that travels across the country bringing new movies and ideas to different communities. The truck adapts to the local cultural contexts by providing an inside screening room for women in areas that are gender segregated.

Malala Yousafzai

Malala Yousafzai is a notable activist from Swat Valley for women's and girl's right to education who came to activism during this period from her personal experiences and passion for learning. When she was 10 the Taliban took over her community and banned girls from participating in public education. She and her father criticized the Taliban. Yousafzai started an anonymous blog where she spoke out about her concerns. She became internally displaced in 2009 due to the conflicts within her community. Once she returned she advocated openly for her right to education. She was awarded both the Pakistan's National Youth Peace Prize and the International Children's Peace Prize. Yousafzai was subsequently shot by the Taliban while riding the school bus. She survived the severe injury and went to study in the U.K. and earned her degree from Oxford. Yousafzai has gone on to write a book, I Am Malala, about her experiences and advocacy work. Yousafzai also runs a nonprofit that focuses on advocating for the education of girls in the global south by conducting research, and connecting local activists to funds.

=== 2018 – present ===
The feminist movement in Pakistan was altered after 2008 with the popularization of social media. The movement gained momentum as women were increasingly able to share their ideas and beliefs. Aurat March (Women Marches) are now held in numerous cities over the country, advocating for issues such as increased political participation and representation of women, gender and sexual minorities, religious minorities, and other marginalized groups in Pakistan. The movement has also demanded for public spaces to be made safer for women and transgender people, as well as called for an end to all violence against women and transgender people.

== Variants ==
According to Maliha Zia, feminism in Pakistan can be found in two forms: Secular Liberal Feminism and Islamic Feminism. There are many debates between these forms of activism. Both are heavily shaped by the context of Pakistan and its political system. Although these are the two emerging sects of feminist activism many scholars argue that this is a complicated topic with many gray areas.

=== Liberal Feminism ===
Liberal feminism is most prominent in leftist liberal circles, and is often supported by left-leaning political parties such as PPP. It is often characterized by liberal values of freedom, liberty, human rights and secularism. This differs from that of western Liberal Feminism that typically focuses on personal achievements and working within the pre-existing systems. Liberal or secular feminism in the context of Pakistan works outside of the pre-existing Islamic political structures and take a human-rights-centered approach to women's liberation that is not based on the rights laid out in Islamic texts. This sect focuses on and prioritizes women-specific issues, whereas other sects might prioritize issues of class or race. One goal of this branch is to create secular legal reform.

=== Nisaism/Islamic Feminism ===
Nisaism/Islamic Feminism is more traditionalist in nature and supports the acquisition of women rights under an Islamic lens. The movement is mainly supported by centrists and the right-wing parties of Pakistan. The word Nisaism comes from Surah Nisa, a chapter of Qur'an, demonstrating the Islamic roots of the movement. The movement has faced some criticism for preaching Islamic rights; some secular feminists believe that Islam is intertwined with the patriarchy. To fully understand this approach one must understand the political and legal systems within Pakistan. Pakistan is an Islamic country making courts and judicial processes influenced by Islamic practices and teachings. Thus, laws must be in accordance with the Quran in order for them to be passed by the Shariat Court, which is the only court that has constitutional power. This makes activism through Islam a more viable reality for some feminists wanting to make legal change.

== Art and literature ==
Pakistani feminist art and literature is often at odds with orthodox advice literature, known for imposing religious dogma through puritanical reform; feminist authors often describe the journey of feminism in Pakistan as an oscillating battle, where women's movements struggle against the continued backlash of the patriarchal hegemony. According to Shahbaz Ahmad Cheema, the Pakistani patriarchy produces literature and art with the ultimate goal of making women accept, internalize, and promote patriarchal discourse as an ideal. Afiya S Zia identifies some of the writings she considers to be most problematic, such as those of Sir Syed Ahmed Khan; Ashraf Ali Thanawi's Bahishti Zewar; and, in post-partition times, Abu Ala Maududi's writings, which she considers to intend to create and sustain a privileged Muslim class, further facilitating and supporting patriarchal male dominance. Television and film likewise continue to present submissive and subservient Pakistani women in a male-dominated Pakistani society.

S.S. Sirajuddin in the Encyclopedia of Post-Colonial Literature in English, expresses reservations about the availability of free space for feminism in Pakistan, and feels that the nation is still much affected by religious fervor. However, she admits that awareness of feminist concerns, the changing role of women, and female identity do exist in Pakistan, and these concerns are reflected in Pakistan's English literature.

Major female characters can be observed in novels like Bapsi Sidhwa, and Sara Suleri's Meatless Days. Pakistani poets like Maki Kureishi, Hina Faisal Imam, Alamgir Hashmi, and Taufiq Rafat are considered to be sensitive but restrained in their portrayal.

One of the first feminist films in Pakistan was called Aurat Raj (Women's Rule). It was released in 1979, but failed to achieve at the box-office.

Womansplaining: Navigating Activism, Politics and Modernity in Pakistan is 2021 collection of feminist essays edited by Sherry Rehman consisting of essays by Hina Jilani, Khawar Mumtaz, Afiya Shehrbano Zia and others narrating the history of the Muslim Family Law Ordinance, Women's Action Forum and various legislative changes in Pakistan's history. Bina Shah and Fifi Haroon write about feminism and the arts, Nighat Dad tells about feminism in the digital age.

=== Ismat Chughtai ===
Beginning in the 1930s, Ismat Chughtai wrote extensively on themes including female sexuality and femininity, middle-class gentility, and class conflict, often from a Marxist perspective.

=== Fatima Bhutto ===
Fatima Bhutto is the daughter of former Minister Murtaza Bhutto. She is the author of three novels. Songs of Blood and Sword is a memoir of her father, who was assassinated.

=== Farkhanda Shahid Khan ===
Farkhanda Shahid Khan is a feminist researcher, activist, and academic. She teaches contemporary English literature at Government College University Faisalabad. Her research focuses on Feminism, Marxism, Culture, and Gender & Sexuality with an emphasis on the Global South. In academic collaboration with the School of Literature, Languages & Cultures at the University of Edinburgh, Khan is currently working on a project that examines the complexities of women residing in the red-light districts and brothel quarters in Pakistan, an often-taboo subject in the country. In addition to her academic endeavors, Khan frequently writes for national and international press, providing nuanced insights into human rights issues, particularly those pertaining to women's rights in Pakistan and its neighbouring countries. She has advocated for gender equality in various forums, including UN Women, Private Members' Special Committee on Gender Equity in the Legislative Assembly of British Columbia and The City of Atlanta's Human Relations Commission. Furthermore, she leads the Pakistan chapters of The Literary Think Tank and the Edinburgh University Feminist Society. She is also the founder of Feminist Society at Government College University Faisalabad.

== Feminist organizations of Pakistan ==
- Alliance Against Sexual Harassment at Work place (AASHA)
- All Pakistan Women's Association (APWA)
- Convention on the Elimination of All Forms of Discrimination Against Women (CEDAW)
- Democratic Women's Association (DWA)
- Gender and Development
- Feminist Society at GCUF (femsoc@gcuf) founded by Farkhanda Shahid Khan at the department of English Literature in Government College University Faisalabad
- National Commission on the Status of Women (NCSW)
- United Front for Women's Rights (UFWA)
- Women's Political Participation Project
- Tehrik-e-Niswan (The Women's Movement)
- Sindhiani Tahreek (Sindhi women's movement)
- Women Democratic Front
- Aurat Foundation
- Society for Appraisal and Women Empowerment in Rural Areas (SAWERA)
- Acid Survivors Trust International
- Pakistan Federation of Business and Professional Women
- Young Women's Christian Association (YWCA)
- Pakistan Women Lawyers' Association
- Women's Action Forum (WAF)
- Pax Femina
- Feminist Society at LUMS (FemSoc@Lums)
- Shirkat Gah
- Aurat March
- Malala Fund
- Girls at Dhabas
- Blue Veins
- Shemale Association for Fundamental Rights (SAFAR)
- Wajood (NGO on Transgender rights, run by Bubbli Malik)
- Akhuwat Khawajasira Program (Organization for Transgender rights, Prjoct Coordinator: Aradhiya Khan)
- All Pakistan Transgender Election Network (APTEN) (Chairperson Nayyab Ali)
- Pakistan Jamhooriat-Pasand Khwateen (Pakistan Women's Democratic Front)
- Dastak
- The Fearless Collective

== Pakistani feminists ==
- Atiya Fyzee Rahamin Known for passion in art, music, writing and education and travel; In 1926 at an educational conference at Aligarh, Fyzee defied expectations of Purdah seclusion and addressed the gathering unveiled (without Hijab) to demand equal rights with men to go about on God's earth freely and openly
- Asma Barlas - Pakistani-American professor at Ithaca College, and author of "Believing Women" in Islam: Unreading Patriarchal Interpretations of the Qur'an
- Hoorunisa Palijo - Founder of Revolutionary Sindhiani Tahreek (Feminist resistance against military dictatorship of General Zia Era in 1980
- Fahmida Riaz - Feminist Poet, Writer and Activist.
- Noorul Huda Shah - Feminist Author and Drama Writer
- Mukhtaran Bibi - Pakistani advocate for rape prevention and women's rights
- Zaib-un-Nissa Hamidullah - Pakistan's first woman columnist and editor, first woman to speak at Al-Azhar University, and author of The Bull and the She Devil
- Nigar Ahmed - Key Activist for Pakistani Women Rights and Founder of Aurat Foundation
- Riffat Hassan - Pakistani-American theologian and scholar of the Qur'an
- Zilla Huma Usman - Pakistani politician and activist, assassinated February 2007
- Benazir Bhutto - Prime Minister of Pakistan, assassinated December 27, 2007
- Asma Jahangir - Co-founder of Human Rights Commission of Pakistan social activist, lawyer
- Amar Sindhu - famous Author, Poet, Activist and Women Rights Leader.
- Farkhanda Shahid Khan - Pakistani feminist researcher, activist, and academic
- Fouzia Saeed - Pakistani social activist, feminist and author of key literature on women issues including her famous book TABOO: The Hidden Culture of a Red-Light District.
- Sheema Kermani - Classical dancer and social activist, pioneer for theatre activism in Pakistan, founder of Tehrik-e-Niswan.
- Nida Mahmoed - Pakistan based first feminist English poet
- Malala Yousafzai - Pakistani activist for female education and the youngest-ever Nobel Prize laureate
- Sabeen Mahmud - Social Activist, Founder The Second Floor.

== Bibliography ==
- Yaqin, Amina. Gender, Sexuality and Feminism in Pakistani Urdu Writing. United Kingdom, Anthem Press (review)
- Manzoor, Asma . "Aurat Justuju Aur Nisai Andaz E Fikar". Pakistan Journal of Gender Studies, vol. 21, no. 2, Sept. 2021, pp. 153–4
- Feminism, Postfeminism and Legal Theory: Beyond the Gendered Subject?. United Kingdom, Taylor & Francis, 2018

== See also ==
- Acid throwing
- Aurat March
- Honour killing in Pakistan
- Me Too movement (Pakistan)
- Modesty patrol
- Mera Jisam Meri Marzi
- Rape in Pakistan
- Swara
- Vani
- Women in Arab societies
- Women's organisations based in Pakistan
- Women's rights
- Women in Pakistan
- Islamic Feminism
- Women in Islam
- Women related laws in Pakistan
