= MeToo movement in Pakistan =

Movement against sexual abuse and harassment

The #MeToo movement (Urdu: #MeinBhi) in Pakistan is modeled after the international #MeToo movement and began in late 2018 in Pakistani society. It has been used as a springboard to stimulate a more inclusive, organic movement, adapted to local settings, and has aimed to reach all sectors, including the lowest rungs of society.

After the death of 7-year-old Zainab Ansari in January 2018, who was raped and killed, there were a wave of declarations on Pakistan social media in the #MeToo style. According to Pakistan's national commissioner for children and founder of the help line for women, Zia Ahmed Awan, 93% of Pakistan women experience some form of sexual violence in public places in their lifetime.

According to journalist Naila Inayat, in Pakistan, women are "damned if they speak, damned if they don't". Most sexual harassment cases in Pakistan go unreported because those who do come forward are abused and their character and morality are judged. #MeToo or not, in Pakistan, the victim rather than the offender is shamed and blamed, which often results in suffering in silence. According to Farah Amjad, The #MeToo movement in Pakistan "has struggled to make an impact in a deeply patriarchal country". A new generation of feminists is also pressing to change the current situation.

According to Qurrat Mirza, the organizer of Aurat Jalsa (Women's meeting), a precursor to Aurat March 2020, talking about sexual misconduct and bullying of Pakistani women in the MeToo movement often results in legal action, as defamation lawsuits are filed against victims. The cost of defending oneself against defamation prevents many women from filing cases and can result in jail time or fines.

== Issues, allegations and cases ==
In Pakistan when the #MeToo movement began, many issues relating to sexual harassment, misconduct, and violence against Pakistani women surfaced, generating identification and discussion on the range of behaviors and roles of many alleged offenders across the media, film industry, stage, and political realm, including Pakistan's Prime Minister. In addition, clergy charity and social welfare institutions, the judiciary, and Pakistani security establishments such as the police and military came under the spotlight of accusations.

Pakistani women have faced frequent instances of misconduct at work. The high percentage of occurrence without adequate means for redress often leads to women's silence because they are unable to take legal action. Already facing a lack of safety and pay gap at work, women face the constant fear of losing their jobs if they choose to speak about harassment at work. For instance, 70% of the households in the fishing community are headed by women. Needing the income, they often face harassment in silence. Trade unions typically do not help, because of vaguely written laws which favor wealthy and powerful men. For example, the Protection Against Harassment of Women at the Workplace Act, 2010 does not even define what constitutes a workplace. The law also does not apply to informal workers, such as domestic service workers or students.

Failure to adequately describe a workplace leads to low attention to some of the most vulnerable working women, like the over 125,000 women health care workers who provide vaccinations and family planning services for the poorest neighborhoods in Pakistan. Christian sanitation workers, who often have inadequate training and safety equipment, often also face religious discrimination, as do peasant women in Punjab pressing for land rights against military forces. Though there is an ombudsperson to ensure working with women at the Lahore High Court, petitions have been dismissed on technicalities. According to Qurrat Mirza, decriminalization of defamation and legislation which protects minority women from forced religious conversion and forced marriages need to be taken up.

According to Ann Elizabeth Mayer, the Pakistani government has played a contradictory double role in pressing for protections for women. Though ratifying the international Convention on the Elimination of All Forms of Discrimination Against Women (CEDAW), the ratifying committee proposed a reservation which was worded vaguely calling on states to take appropriate measures to abolish discrimination against women which were in-line with the provisions of Constitution of the Islamic Republic of Pakistan. The reservation gave the appearance of complying with international and Islamic law.

=== Domestic violence in Pakistan ===
Domestic violence in Pakistan is an endemic social and public health problem. According to a study carried out in 2009 by Human Rights Watch, it is estimated that between 20 and 30 percent of women in Pakistan have suffered some form of abuse. An estimated 5,000 women are killed per year from domestic violence, with thousands of others maimed or disabled. Women have reported attacks ranging from physical to psychological and sexual abuse from intimate partners.

=== Rape in Pakistan ===
According to Women's Studies professor Shahla Haeri, rape in Pakistan is "often institutionalized and has the tacit and at times the explicit approval of the state". The rape and assault of Christian, Hindu, Sikh and other minorities is reported to be prevalent in Pakistan. Inaction, refusal to file complaints, and intimidation and corruption amongst the police and judiciary are also frequent problems.

Child sexual abuse is widespread in Pakistani schools. In a study of child sexual abuse in Rawalpindi and Islamabad, out of a sample of 300 children, 17% claimed to have been abused and in 1997 one child a day was reported as raped, gang raped or kidnapped for sexual gratification. In September 2014, the British Channel 4 broadcast a documentary called Pakistan's Hidden Shame, directed by Mohammed Naqvi and produced by Jamie Doran, which highlighted the problem of sexual abuse of street children in particular, an estimated 90 percent of whom have been sexually abused.

=== Backlash and defamation in Pakistan ===
As the female body is often attached to both personal and family honor in Pakistan, violence against women is used to inflict punishment or seek revenge. If victims fail to maintain silence, they can be criminally prosecuted under the penal code's defamation law. Police lack sensitivity training, and blaming the victim is common. Police and agents of the Federal Investigation Agency (FIA) do not take reports seriously, often failing to file reports or sending victims to various jurisdictions. The criminal law system ends up favoring perpetrators by allowing victims to be intimidated, abusers to be indirectly identified, and defamation cases to be filed without allowing for the resolution of the case, which is often protracted.

Other feminists are focusing on providing victims with broader legal services. Nighat Dad heads the Digital Rights Foundation, which created 'Ab Aur Nahin' (Translation:Now, No more), a legal support framework for sexual harassment victims. The platform provides working women and students with networks of counselors and pro-bono lawyers to assist them in fighting legal retaliation and misconduct.

=== Individual cases ===
==== Zainab rape-murder case ====
After the death of 7-year-old Zainab Ansari, who was raped and killed in January 2018, a wave of declarations began on Pakistan social media in the #MeToo style. New legislation in 2017, established that the punishment for sexual assault against a minor in Pakistan would result in 14 to 20 years in prison and a minimum fine of 1 million rupees. Sheema Kermani, a classical dancer, has been called the leader of this movement. Former model Frieha Altaf and designer Maheem Khan shared stories of sexual abuse, and challenged Pakistan to be more proactive at stopping children from getting raped.

==== Ali Zafar vs. Meesha Shafi ====
On 19 April 2018, Meesha Shafi accused fellow singer Ali Zafar of sexual harassment on Twitter. More women came in Shafi's support and accused Zafar of misconduct. Zafar categorically denied the allegations and filed a legal defamation suit. Reported as a "high-profile" case, it was ruled in Zafar's favour on 31 March 2026, and Shafi was ordered to pay Rs. 50 lakh in damages. Meanwhile, other cases that were filed include Shafi's workplace harassment case, Zafar's cybercrime case, and two counter-defamation suits against Zafar. While Zafar's legal team claimed that no other case can be pending due to the verdict covering everything, Shafi's legal team filed an appeal against the verdict.

==== Stand-up comedy ====
At least four women leveled allegations of sexual misconduct against Junaid Akram, a prominent stand-up comedian and vlogger. Most of the accusers were girls in their teens and early twenties. Akram denied "all allegations of sexual harassment and sexual misconduct", labeled them "false", and announced that he intended to pursue legal actions and had "already met my legal team".

Akram also clarified that his "marital status is public information".

==== Charity sector ====
The son of world-renowned late philanthropist Abdul Sattar Edhi, Faisal Edhi, who now heads the Edhi Foundation, was accused of sexual misconduct by a former journalist, who said the man "grabbed my hand tightly and tried to kind of pull me back into the van". Faisal Edhi has denied the claims.

== Suicides in Pakistan ==
In 2014, a 17-year-old woman cricketer named Halima Rafiq, alleged that officials of the Multan Cricket Club traded sexual favors for spots on the state team. When the Pakistan Cricket Board conducted an inquiry and then exonerated officials, instead banning five female players for six months, an official sued Rafiq. He asked for $20,000 in damages, which led her to committed suicide. In another case, a 15-year-old who had allegedly been gang raped attempted suicide after one of her alleged attackers, who was part of the ruling political party apparatus, was supported in the Friday Times. The article "claimed DNA tests could prove sexual contact between the victim and the main perpetrator was consensual" and was later retracted.

In an allegedly false case of sexual misconduct claimed by a student against lecturer, Muhammad Afzal, of MAO College, an inquiry declared Afzal innocent, but the college management refused to provide him with a clearance certificate. When his wife left him, Afzal committed suicide citing extreme stress in his suicide note and writing that he would leave the issue in the court of Allah. Afzal's suicide turned the focus away from victims and refocused the debate on the alleged perpetrators and potentially false accusations. The case began to be used to condone ignoring the growing number of sexual harassment cases and culture of violence in the country.

Filmmaker Jami Moor citing his own unaddressed ordeal of sexual harassment came in favor of #MeToo movement. He tweeted saying, what the victims of misconduct say and how they say or hide is all true...So one wrongful suicide doesn't mean all other women victims are fake or liars. He has no doubts that 99.99% victims of sexual misconduct always tell the truth and that he feels upset that vested interests were attacking the #MeToo movement and victims.

== Dismissal and trivialisation ==
Some observers in Pakistan see #MeToo as an import from the West aimed at harming Pakistani culture, destroying family values and exploiting women for a "foreign agenda". Still others, like Pervez Musharraf, former Army Chief and President of Pakistan, have characterized victims as opportunists who used allegations of rape to secure visas and citizenship abroad. Movie director Khalil-ur-Rehman Qamar exemplified the trivialization that the movement receives with his remarks that the #MeToo movement was about women wanting the right to assault men. He said "If you wish to strive for equality then kidnap men as well. Rob a bus, gang rape a man, so that I can understand what you [women] mean by equality."

After 2019's International Women's Day march, called Aurat March, attended by thousands of women across Pakistan, politician and television host, Aamir Liaquat Hussain called for an investigation to determine where women got the money for their demonstrations, suggesting that there were outside influences funding the events. Still other men voiced objection to protesters' posters, like one that said, "Keep your dick pics to yourself." Islamic feminists also complained that the protestors were secular and that their values were too western to represent women who held to Islamic cultural values.

Journalist Rafia Zakaria noted that Pakistan's #MeToo movement is an urban and class-based movement, as only 37% of the country is aware of the internet. Many elite feminists remain silent or try to minimize the problems closing ranks to protect those in their own social class. This manifests in several ways, for example, when a woman from the Pakistan-Afghanistan border region who videoed threats by army personnel and claimed they made sexual overtures to her, she was ignored because no one was interested in battling with the powerful military. In another case, when politician Ayesha Gulalai Wazir accused Prime Minister Imran Khan of inappropriate texts, she was accused by her party and the media of being a political opportunist. Shireen Mazari, Federal Minister for Human Rights, dismissed Gulalai's allegations.

=== Role of Pakistani traditional and social media ===
Pakistani media more often than not protects influential elite offenders, especially those who are engaged in the media industry. When a #MeToo allegation was made against a media tycoon, his identity was initially shielded, and then the accusation was deflected as an attack on the newspaper Dawn for having been critical of the government.

Though there is growing participation of feminists in Pakistani social media, which has increased global discussion of feminism and its context in Pakistan, low awareness of the internet has prevented involvement by those with limited income, low education levels, or who live in rural environments. To bridge the gap, in 2018 the Women's Democratic Front (WDF) was created to promote outreach on social media to working-class and rural women. The WDF is based in Lahore and includes members from the leftist Awami Workers Party

On the other hand, though social media and the internet have allowed women to speak, the platforms have also increased the amount of bullying and harassment they face on line. The Digital Rights Foundation based in Lahore, conducted research in 2017, which determined that 40% of women face cyber-harassment. Fake profiles created to victimize women, blackmail, and abusive comments, have escalated psychological problems such as depression and low self-esteem for victims. Though the Prevention of Electronic Crimes Act of 2016 makes "blackmailing, hacking, unsolicited contact, defamation, fake profiles, online stalking, threats, gender-based bullying" a crime, punishable by prison terms of up to 5 years (10 if the victim is a minor), victims still must file complaints at the FIA regional office. FIA's inadequate responses and lack of access to regional offices for rural women, serve as barriers to the pursuit of legal action.

== Impact ==
Amjad says the #MeToo movement has had mixed results in the country. In part because patriarchy is deeply entrenched in the socio-political and cultural identity of Pakistan, and in part because of the stratified feminist movement which is divided by class, self-interest and status. Though reform has been slow to come, the movement has given momentum to reform of the existing sexual misconduct laws, launch new initiatives, and has heightened awareness of the legal challenges faced by victims.

Saba Karim Khan, an associate instructor in the division of social sciences at New York University in Abu Dhabi, advocates introducing sex education programs in schools and training both sexes about consent and what constitutes harassment in language that they understand rather than legal terms. She also believes that encouraging victims to speak up will achieve the goals of #MeToo movement in Pakistan. Students at Cedar College in Karachi, frustrated by the slow response of administrators to harassment at their school, contacted activists and lawyers to help them draft a policy for sexual harassment for the school. School officials were receptive and brought in other members to the team, which in 2018 resulted in a broad policy covering sexual harassment and misconduct, as well as intimidation, like bullying or cyber-stalking.

The #MeToo movement sparked analysis by the Pakistani legal fraternity, who wrote media articles about the various laws governing sexual misconduct and their limitations. When pressed by activist, Asma Jahangir, the Supreme Court of Pakistan directed federal and provincial legislatures to simplify the processes and strengthen protections in the existing codes dealing with sexual misconduct. In private initiatives, like the one launched at Cedar College with the help of members of the Girls at Dhabas and the Women's Action Forum, the policy developed for one school, has become a model policy for other educational institutions across Pakistan.

== See also ==
- Women in Pakistan
- Feminism in Pakistan
- Women's Action Forum
- All Pakistan Women's Association
- Girls at Dhabas
- Blue Veins
- Pakistan Federation of Business and Professional Women
- Aurat Foundation
- Women's rights
- Women in Islam
- Cynthia D. Ritchie
- Judiciary of Pakistan#Harassment of women judges
- Women related laws in Pakistan

== Bibliography ==
- Vogelstein, Rachel B., and Stone, Meighan. Awakening: #MeToo and the Global Fight for Women's Rights. United States, PublicAffairs, 2021.
