= Mera Jism Meri Marzi =

Feminist slogan in Pakistan

Mera Jism Meri Marzi (Urdu: میرا جسم میری مرضی; lit. 'My body, my choice') is a slogan used by feminists in Pakistan to demand bodily autonomy and protest gender-based violence.

The slogan was popularized during the Aurat March in Pakistan, which has been observed on International Women's Day since 2018.

== Origin and background ==
Feminism in Pakistan

"When I say
Mera Jism Meri Marzi,
I don't mean
I want strip my clothes off
and run around naked! ...
I mean to say that
I am a human
and this is my body,
so it is up to me
whether I allow you
to stare at it
or touch it, or not.
It means that I
can report you
if you don't comply.
It means that I
can take an action
against you if you harass me
because you have
no right over MY body."
~ Mahira Khan.

— dailypakistan.com.pk
"Mahira Khan faces backlash
for supporting
Mera Jism Meri Marzi slogan'".
February 2021

The slogan was first chanted in Pakistan during the 2018 Aurat March. Protestors and organizers carried signs with different slogans, including Mera Jism Meri Marzi.

The march came under harsh criticism from conservatives, who said that the march opposed typical religious and cultural values of Pakistani society, which is patriarchal and predominantly Muslim. These conservatives said that the slogan was a call for vulgarity and nudity. However, feminists said that the slogan should be interpreted in a broader sense: they were protesting against abuse and harassment. More specifically, they use the slogan because they believe that women should not be touched or pursued sexually against their will. According to Muhammad Anwar Nasar, the slogan is symbolic, not literal. The expression underlines the structural violence, injustices, and inequality inflicted on Pakistani women. By using this slogan, Pakistani feminists protest honor killings, acid attacks, harassment in public places and offices, child rape, forced pregnancy, female genital mutilation, forced child marriages, the vani custom, and domestic violence. The slogan also demands an equitable world without sexism.

Zainab Najeeb, a reporter, advises opponents of the slogan not to misinterpret the language. Conservative opponents have said that the slogan supports prostitution and attacks morality; Najeeb disagrees. She contends that women are humans, and as humans they should have bodily autonomy. She argues that both the Constitution and Islamic texts recognize women as human beings, so no contradiction exists between the slogan and religious society. Najeeb asserts that Mera Jism Meri Marzi is a declaration of women's independence: the slogan defends a woman's right to dress as she pleases, to receive medical help without fear of social taboos, to be seen as a human rather than a "piece of meat", to choose a partner or to not have a partner at all, and to protect herself from harassment.

== Usage ==
The slogan was first used in Pakistan during the Aurat March in 2018. It saw use again during the 2019 Aurat March. It has been hotly debated in the Pakistan media and on social media platforms. For the most part, the slogan Mera Jism Meri Marzi has been criticized for not conforming to social norms. Feminists promote the slogan with the hashtag #MeraJismMeriMarzi on social media platforms. Those who oppose the slogan use the hashtag #WeRejectMeraJismMeriMarzi.

== Variations ==
The slogan Mera Jism Meri Marzi has led to new slogans. During the 2020 Aurat March, many protestors used slogans with similar meanings, such as:

- Meri Zindagi Meri Marzi (میری زندگی میری مرضی; lit. 'My life, my choice')
- Meri Zindagi Mere Faisalay (میری زندگی میرے فیصلے; lit. 'My life, my decisions')
- Meri Zindagi Mera Ikhtiyar (میری زندگی میرا اختیار; lit. 'My life, my discretion')
- Mera Mazhab Meri Marzi (میرا مذہب میری مرضی; lit. 'My religion, my choice')
- Mera Wajood Meri Marzi (میرا وجود میری مرضی; lit. 'My existence, My choice')
- Mera Poster Tumhari Marzi? (میرا پوسٹر تمہاری مرضی؟; lit. 'My poster, your choice?')

Other heavily criticized slogans used during the Aurat March include:

- Nazar teri gandi aur purdah mein keroun ("Why do I adopt the veil because of your bad habit of ogling?")
- Agar dupatta itna pasand hai tou apni aankhon pe bandh lo ("If you like the scarf so much, then tie it around your eyes")
- Tu kare tou Stud, Mai Karun tou Slut ("If you do it, you're a stud, but if I do it, I'm a slut")
- Khana khud garam karo ("Ready the food yourself")

== Criticism ==
The religious right criticized Mera Jism Meri Marzi and other slogans, including those mentioned above, because they believed that the slogans went against traditional values. Clergy labeled the slogan indecent, and a National Assembly panel called it "immoral". It was also criticized for not addressing the real issues that women in Pakistan face. Mera Jism Meri Marzi was discussed extensively on social media, and many conservatives started campaigns against it. It became a major tool in online fights, with both liberals and conservatives using the slogan to defend their own opinions or degrade others. The slogan was also debated in national media, with women's rights activists vouching for it and clergy calling it un-Islamic. Feminists defended the slogan, citing a February 2020 honor killing in which two brothers killed their sister and her child after the sister married a person of her own choice; the feminists viewed the murder as an attack on the sister's bodily autonomy.

== Controversies ==
Writer Khalil ur Rehman Qamar appeared on a talk show on Neo News. During the debate, feminist activist Marvi Sirmed interrupted him by chanting "Mera Jism Meri Marzi". He retaliated with sexist remarks and comments about her body, which led some to boycott him. He had previously been criticized for some of his remarks on his drama Meray Paas Tum Ho, which were interpreted as misogynistic. However, many people on social media defended Khalil ur Rehman Qamar and supported his statements.

Owing to the ongoing debate over Mera Jism Meri Marzi, the Pakistan Electronic Media Regulatory Authority (PEMRA) released an advisory restricting media houses from broadcasting the slogan.

A case was filed in Lahore High Court to stop the Aurat March, and certain feminist slogans such as Mera Jism Meri Marzi were discussed during the hearing; however, the court allowed the march on the condition that no discriminatory or immoral slogans be used. Another case was also filed in the Islamabad High Court to stop the Aurat March. The court asked the petitioner how these slogans are un-Islamic and dismissed the petition.

== Reciprocal slogans and meme war ==
In response to the Aurat March, some men organized the Mard March (lit. 'Men's march') in Islamabad. Many carried signs with slogans spoofing Mera Jism Meri Marzi, including Apni chupkalli khud maro ("Kill the lizard yourself"), Ladies first, Gents first kab ayega? ("Ladies first, when will there be gents first?"), and Meri nazrein, Meri marzi ("My eyes, my choice").

== In popular media and culture ==
- 'Aurat Gardi', a web series by Javeria Saud, endorsed the slogan.

== See also ==
- Aurat March
- Aurat Foundation
- Blue Veins
- Girls at Dhabas
- International Women's Day
- Me Too movement (Pakistan)
- Rape in Pakistan
- Violence against women in Pakistan
- Women in Islam
- Women's Action Forum
- Women's Protection Bill
- Women's rights
