= Moral policing =

Moral policing may refer to:

- Moral police in India
- Muslim patrol incidents in London
- Mishmeret tzniyut in Israel
- Islamic religious police
