= Freedom of choice =

Political and social concept

Freedom of choice is an individual's opportunity and autonomy to perform an action selected from at least two available options, unconstrained by external parties.

== In politics ==
In the abortion debate, for example, the term "freedom of choice" may emerge in defense of the position that a woman has a right to determine whether she will proceed with or terminate a pregnancy. Similarly, other topics such as euthanasia, vaccination, contraception, and same-sex marriage are sometimes discussed in terms of an assumed individual right of "freedom of choice". Some social issues, for example the New York "Soda Ban" have been both defended and opposed, with reference to "freedom of choice".

== In economics ==
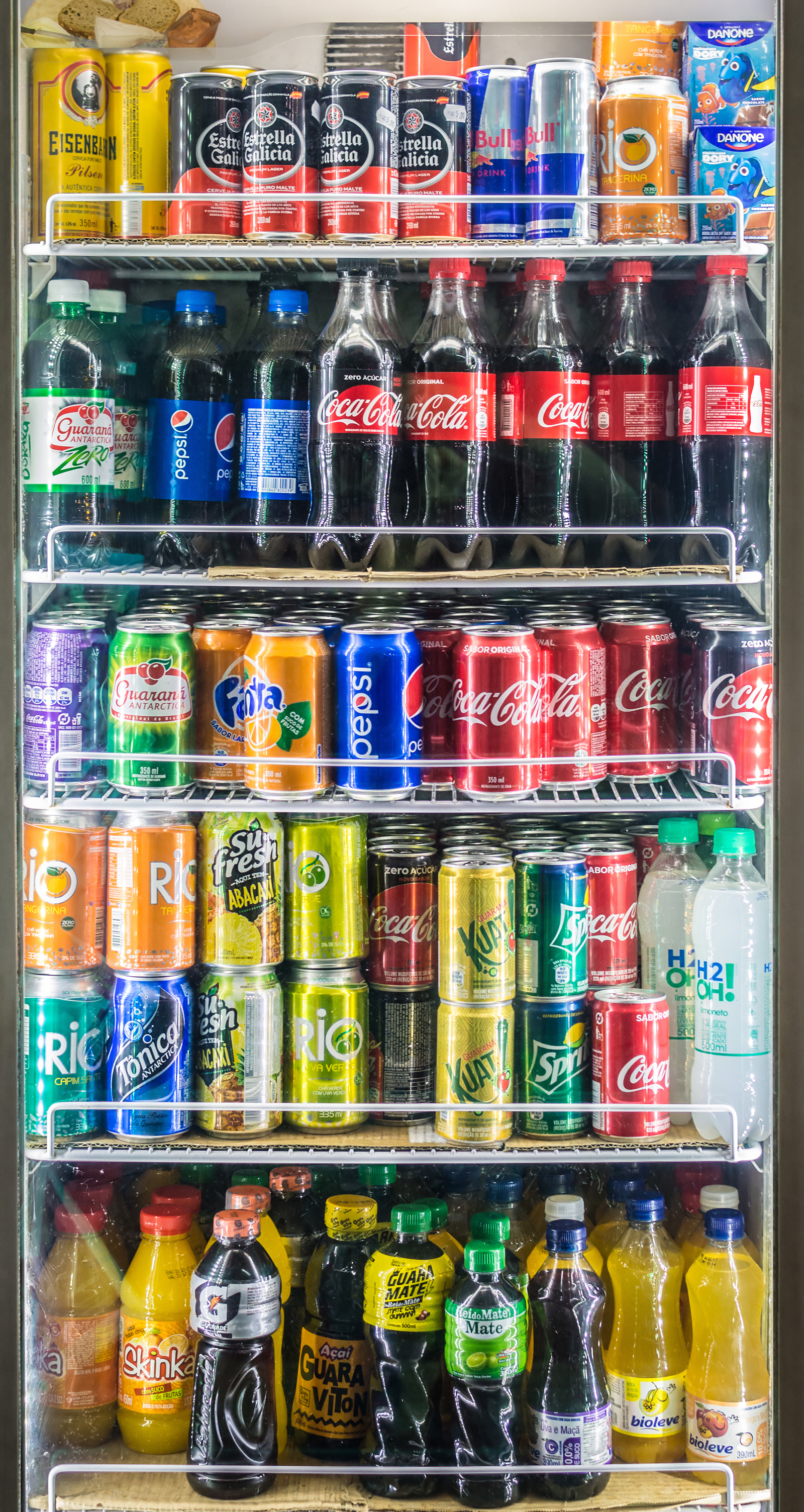
The freedom of choice on which brand and flavor of soda to buy is related to market competition.

In microeconomics, freedom of choice is the freedom of economic agents to allocate their resources (such as goods, services, or assets) as they see fit, among the options that are available to them. It includes the freedom to engage in employment available to them.

Ratner et al., in 2008, cite the literature on libertarian paternalism which states that consumers do not always act in their own best interests. They attribute this phenomenon to factors such as emotion, cognitive limitations and biases, and incomplete information - which they state may be remedied by various proposed interventions. They discuss providing consumers with information and decision tools, organizing and restricting their market options, and tapping emotions and managing expectations. Each of these, they state, could improve consumers' ability to choose.

However, economic freedom to choose ultimately depends upon market competition, since buyers' available options are usually the result of various factors controlled by sellers, such as overall quality of a product or a service and advertisement. In the event that a monopoly exists, the consumer no longer has the freedom to choose to buy from a different producer. As Friedrich Hayek pointed out:

Our freedom of choice in a competitive society rests on the fact that, if one person refuses to satisfy our wishes, we can turn to another. But if we face a monopolist we are at his absolute mercy.

— Friedrich Hayek, The Road to Serfdom, "Can planning free us from care?"

As exemplified in the above quote, libertarian thinkers are often strong advocates for increasing freedom of choice. One example of this is Milton Friedman's Free to Choose book and TV series.

There is no consensus as to whether an increase in economic freedom of choice leads to an increase in happiness. In one study, the Heritage Foundation's 2011 Index of Economic Freedom report showed a strong correlation between its Index of Economic Freedom and happiness in a country.

== In history ==
Suzanne K. Becking sees "the freedom to choose" as a fundamental basis of colonisation and national development in North America.

== Measuring freedom of choice ==
The axiomatic-deductive approach found in game theory has been used to address the issue of measuring the amount of freedom of choice (FoC) an individual enjoys. In a 1990 paper, Prasanta K. Pattanaik and Yongsheng Xu presented three conditions that a measurement of FoC should satisfy:

1. Indifference between no-choice situations. Having only one option amounts to the same FoC, no matter what the option is.
2. Strict monotonicity. Having two distinct options x and y amounts to more FoC than having only the option x.
3. Independence. If a situation A has more FoC than B, by adding a new option x to both (not contained in A or B), A will still have more FoC than B.

They proved that the cardinality is the only measurement that satisfies these axioms, which they observed to be counter-intuitive and suggestive that one or more axioms should be reformulated. They illustrated this with the example of the option set "to travel by train" or "to travel by car", that should yield more FoC than the option set "to travel by red car" or "to travel by blue car". Some suggestions have been made to solve this problem, by reformulating the axioms, usually including concepts of preferences, or rejecting the third axiom.

== Relationship with happiness ==
A 2006 study by Simona Botti and Ann L. McGill showed that, when subjects were presented with differentiated options and had the freedom to choose between them, their choice enhanced their satisfaction with positive and dissatisfaction with negative outcomes, relative to nonchoosers.

A 2010 study by Hazel Rose Markus and Barry Schwartz compiled a list of experiments about freedom of choice and argued that "too much choice can produce a paralyzing uncertainty, depression, and selfishness". Schwartz argues that people frequently experience regret due to opportunity costs for not making an optimal decision and that, in some scenarios, people's overall satisfaction are sometimes higher when a difficult decision is made by another person rather than by themselves, even when the other person's choice is worse. Schwartz had written a book and given speeches criticizing the excess of options in modern society, though acknowledging that "some choice is better than none".

== See also ==
- Choice § Evaluability in economics – Deciding between multiple options
- Choice feminism – Forms of feminism that emphasize freedom of choice
- Consumer Bill of Rights § The right to choose – Guidelines for consumer protection
- Consumer choice – Aspect of economics
- Consumer sovereignty – Economic consumer theory
- Equal opportunity – Aspect of social equality
- Externality – Imposed cost or benefit in economics
- Free to Choose, a book and TV series by Milton Friedman and Rose Friedman
- Free-rider problem – Market failure benefitting non-paying users
- Free will – Ability to make choices voluntarily
- My body, my choice – Slogan for bodily autonomy
- Parasitism (social offense) – Crime of living at the expense of others
- Right to die – Moral and legal concept
- Right to silence – Right to refuse to answer questions
- Self-ownership – Concept of property in one's own person
- Social conscience – Sense of responsibility or concern for the problems of society
- Tragedy of the commons – Overuse of a shared resource
- Tyranny of small decisions – Economic phenomenon
