= Shehzil Malik =

Pakistani illustrator and artist (born 1987)

- Born: 1987 (age 38–39); Lahore, Punjab, Pakistan
- Education: Rochester Institute of Technology (MFA, 2014)
- Occupations: Illustrator; graphic designer; artist
- Years active: 2014–present
- Website: shehzil.com

Shehzil Malik (born 1987) is a Pakistani illustrator, graphic designer and artist whose work focuses on feminism, gender-based violence and representations of South Asian women.

== Early life and education ==
Malik was born in Lahore in 1987. She studied visual communication design at the Rochester Institute of Technology in the United States as a Fulbright scholar, graduating with an MFA in 2014.

== Career ==
After completing her studies, Malik returned to Lahore and worked as an art director at Ogilvy & Mather. She has taught at Beaconhouse National University. Between 2021 and 2023 she held a fellowship at the Graduate School of the Universität der Künste Berlin, and she has been based in Berlin subsequently.

Malik's early series Women in Public Spaces depicted street harassment and the constraints placed on women's movement. Her subsequent Brown Is Beautiful series engaged with colourism and skin lightening practices, while her Hijabi Biker image, which depicted a veiled young woman riding a motorbike, was reproduced as an 11-foot mural on a wall in Lahore.

Malik has produced posters and visual materials for several editions of the Aurat March, the annual Pakistani International Women's Day march. For the Aurat March in 2019 she created the series My Body, My Choice, addressing themes including rape, female genital mutilation and maternal mortality.

== Writing ==
Malik wrote and illustrated the picture book The Biker Girls, her debut as an author–illustrator. She illustrated the picture-book biography A Girl Called Genghis Khan (Sterling Children's Books) by Michelle Lord, based on the life of the Pakistani squash player Maria Toorpakai Wazir. She also edited Bystander Anthology, a volume of comic and graphic narratives bringing together approximately 50 South Asian contributors on themes of geography, gender and identity.
