= Pakistan Federation of Business and Professional Women =

Pakistan Federation of Business and Professional Women is a women's rights organization based in Karachi, Pakistan. Begum Kulsoom Saifullah Khan was a President.

== See also ==
- All Pakistan Women's Association
- Aurat Foundation
- Blue Veins
- Nursing in Pakistan
- Women's Action Forum
- Women's rights
- Women in Islam
- Women in Pakistan
