= Violence against women in Pakistan =

Public health issue of violent acts against women

Violence against women in Pakistan, particularly intimate partner violence and sexual violence, is a major public health problem and a violation of women's human rights in Pakistan. Women in Pakistan mainly encounter violence by being forced into marriage, through workplace sexual harassment, domestic violence and by so-called honour killings.

== History ==
In Pakistan, domestic violence is considered a private matter, as it occurs in the family. Spousal abuse is rarely considered a crime socially unless it takes the extreme form of murder or attempted murder. Various forms of domestic violence include physical, mental and emotional abuse.

In the late 70s and 80's, Pakistan witnessed a regression of women's rights and laws were amended to reflect this discrimination. However, in the last 10–15 years, there has been some success in passing policies and laws to prevent practices such as early age marriages, honor killings, sexual harassment, domestic violence and rape. Many of these laws have been introduced by women parliamentarians in Pakistan.

According to Dr. Rukhsana Iftikhar and Dr. Maqbool Ahmad Awan in the Journal of Political Studies, "Pakistan is an agrarian state where the concept of personal ownership is very much common", with the two writing "Women are also considered personal properties in Pakistan". The two state that such violence persists due to religious and cultural norms within the country. Pakistani women are expected to maintain modesty while men are expected to project masculinity to keep honour among their families. Traditional views in Pakistan believe that if dishonour is not corrected, it may spread beyond the singular incident and into the community.

== Acts of violence ==
Poverty is one of the important causes for violence in Pakistan. In Pakistan, every third women is illiterate and hence unaware about her rights. Increased level of education can create awareness and help them to speak up for their rights and bring change in their status. Some ancient traditions and customs which are still followed include exchange marriages, marriage with Quran, Karo Kari, honor killing and dowry.

=== Domestic violence ===
In a 2008 survey, 70% of women respondents reported that they experienced domestic violence. According to a 2009 Human Rights Watch report, 70-90% of Pakistani women suffered with some kind of domestic violence. About 5,000 women are killed annually from domestic violence in Pakistan, with thousands of other women maimed or disabled. Law enforcement authorities do not view domestic violence as a crime and usually refuse to register any cases brought to them.

In the 2012-2013 Pakistan Demographic and Health Survey, 3,867 married or previously married women were questioned. Of the respondents, 47% of these women believed that physical violence was just if a wife had argued with her husband. The survey found that such beliefs on domestic violence were often passed down to future generations of children. Marital rape is also a common form of spousal abuse and it is considered to be a crime under Pakistani laws.

=== Forced conversion of minority girls ===
In Pakistan, Hindu and Christian girls are kidnapped, raped, forcibly converted to Islam and forced to marry Muslim men. About 1,000 non-Muslim girls are forcibly converted to Islam in Pakistan every year.

However, according to "[t]he All Pakistan Hindu Panchayat (APHP)...[the] majority of cases of marriages between Hindu women and Muslim men were result of love affairs. It said due to honour, the family members of women concoct stories of abduction and forced conversions". Forced conversions to Islam have become a new form of violent extremism in Pakistan. It affects almost all religious minority groups in Pakistan but Hindu teenage girls in the Sindh province are the main victims. Even after 70 years, the trend of forced conversions in the country is continues to occur, despite Pakistan's constitution, which provides equal rights to all religious minorities.

=== Honour killing ===
Historically, honour killings have occurred in sub-continent for hundreds of years and authorities in the country, legally obligated to treat such incidents as a crime of homicide, often ignore such killings. As of 2019, thousands of honour killings occurred annually in Pakistan.

=== Rape and sexual violence ===
The topic of sex is a taboo subject in Pakistan, therefore women often refrain from reporting their experiences with rape. According to a study carried out by Human Rights Watch in 2009, there was a rape once every two hours and a gang rape every hour in 2009.

Women's Studies professor Shahla Haeri stated that rape in Pakistan is "often institutionalized and has the tacit and at times the explicit approval of the state". According to lawyer Asma Jahangir, who was a co-founder of the women's rights group Women's Action Forum, up to seventy-two percent of women in custody in Pakistan are physically or sexually abused.

=== Transgender women ===
Between 2015 and 2020, according to TransAction Alliance Khyber Pakhtunkhwa, 68 transgender people were murdered in the province of Khyber-Pakhtunkhwa, and in 2018 alone, 479 transgender women were attacked in the province.

== Law ==
=== Existing laws ===
Article 25 of the 1973 Pakistani constitution states: "All citizens are equal before law and are entitled to equal protection of law. There shall be no discrimination on the basis of sex. Nothing in this Article shall prevent the State from making any special provision for the protection of women and children."

Article 23 of the 1973 Constitution states: "Provision as to property. Every citizen shall have the right to acquire, hold and dispose of property in any part of Pakistan, subject to the Constitution and any reasonable restrictions imposed by law in the public interest."

Article 310A states: "Punishment for giving a female in marriage or otherwise in badla-e-sulh, wanni or swara.- Whoever gives a female in marriage or otherwise compels her to enter into marriage, as badal-e-sulh, wanni, or swara or any other custom or practice under any name, in consideration of settling a civil dispute or a criminal liability, shall be punished with imprisonment of either description for a term which may extend to seven years but shall not be less than three years and shall also be liable to fine of five hundred thousand rupees."

The Prevention of Anti Women Practices Act 2011 states: "Whoever by deceitful or, illegal means deprives any woman from inheriting any movable or immovable property at the time of opening of succession shall be punished with imprisonment for either description for a term which may extend to ten years but not be less than five years or with a fine of one million rupees or both."

=== National Commission on Status of Women ===
National Commission on Status of Women in Pakistan is federally administrated department to ensure the effective legislation for women in Pakistan. National Commission on the Status of Women (NCSW) is a statutory body, established in July 2000. It is an outcome of the national and international commitments of the Government of Pakistan. Three Commissions have completed their respective term of three years. Term of the last Commission expired on 31 December 2008. It was established with the specific purpose to examine policies, programs and other measures taken by the Government for women's development and gender equality. The strategies of NCSW are Work and lobby with lawmakers, parliamentarians and other decision makers for promotion of laws and regulations aimed at empowering women. Advocate, lobby and build coalitions and network for promoting women's rights whereas the priorities are Ensuring the development of implementation mechanisms for laws passed in last five years. Undertaking select litigations, e.g. against Jirga's, honor killing etc. Promoting enactment of pending legislations for women's protections and empowerment.

=== Women related laws in Pakistan ===
- Domestic Violence (Prevention and Protection) Bill 2009
- Acid Control and Acid Crime Prevention Act 2010
- The Dowry And Bridal Gifts Act
- The Protection Against Harassment of Women at the workplace Act ( 2010)
- The Criminal Law (Amendment) Act 2010
- The Prevention of Anti-Women Practices Act ( 2011)
- The Women in Distress and Detention Fund ( 2011)
- The Criminal Law (Amendment) Act 2011( Prevention of Acid crimes incidents)
- The Domestic Violence Prevention and Protection Bill 2012
- National Commission on Status of Women Act 2012
- National Commission for Human Rights Act 2012
- Women, Violence and Jirgas Act

=== Women's property and use rights in personal laws ===
==== The Muslim Family Laws Ordinance, 1961 ====
A Muslim marriage is still legal if it is contracted according to the religious requisite. A man who wants to enter a subsequent marriage must submit an application and pay a fee to the local Union Council. The application must state the reasons for the proposed marriage and indicate whether the applicant has obtained the consent of the existing wife or wives. A polygamous marriage contracted without the Union Council's approval cannot be registered. The minimum marriage age is set at 18 years for men and 16 for women. Under-age marriages are not rendered invalid.

==== The dissolution of Muslim Marriage Act, 1939, amended in 1961 ====
A wife is entitled to all the property that she has earned for herself and also to the benefits deriving from the property of the husband. The Act guarantees women with the right to divorce, also known as Khula. Maintenance of the wife is responsibility of husband during the whole duration of marriage. A woman can get a decree for the dissolution of the marriage if her husband contracts a polygamous marriage in contravention of the Muslim Family Laws Ordinance.

==== The Married Women's Property Act, 1874 ====
A married woman has the right to separate property and to take legal proceedings in her name.

=== Inheritance legal mechanisms ===
Inheritance provisions may vary depending on whether the deceased was a Christian, a Hindu, or a Muslim. Inheritance for Muslims is governed by Islamic Shariah. The definitions of heirs, and their shares, are decided according to their sects and sub-sects.

==== The Muslim Family Law Ordinance, 1961 ====
Female children are entitled to half the inheritance of male children; wives inherit one-eighth of their husband's estate. The 1962 West Pakistan Muslim Personal Law Shariat Application Act entitled Muslim women to inherit all property, including agricultural property. It also extended the Shariat to all of West Pakistan, except tribal areas in the North West Frontier Province. The law of inheritance is based on the following principles: All shares are distributed to legal heirs by intestate succession. Heirs acquire an absolute interest in specific shares of the estate of their ancestor, even before distribution. Vested inheritance may occur. For example, if an heir dies before distribution, but was alive at the ancestor's death, the share of his/her vested inheritance passes on to his/ her heirs.

== Domestic violence during COVID-19 ==
Domestic violence cases surged during the lock-down period that was imposed because of COVID-19.

Many media outlets reported cases of domestic violence nationwide. Statistics show a 25% rise in domestic violence for one province only. Government agencies and NGOs working for the victims have suffered from the Pandemic as well and are lacking in infrastructure. Many of the shelters have been turned into quarantine stations due to which domestic violence cases cannot be entertained. The government has issued a COVID-19 alert that provides a helpline, 1099, and a WhatsApp number 0333 908 5709, to report cases of domestic violence during lock down.

Amidst the COVID-19 lockdowns, lost jobs, economic downturn, and husbands working from home, Pakistan is witnessing a disturbing surge in spousal abuse and domestic violence.

== List of government departments and NGOs working for women ==
Legal hotlines provide emergency support and referral services over the phone those in volatile relationships. Hotlines are generally dedicated to women escaping abusive relationships and provide referral to women's shelters. There are various helplines providing services to women in sufferings in Pakistan.

=== Ministry of Human Rights Women Centre and helplines ===
The Ministry of Human Rights is managing and operating Shaheed Benazir Bhutto Human Rights Centre for Women in Islamabad. Victims of violence can share their sufferings in strict confidentiality with volunteers and social of pain and humiliation. The center is equipped with facilities including free medical and legal aid and has a shelter home.

The Ministry of Human Rights operates helpline number 1099, and the centre is located at Ministry of Human Rights, St # 04, Pitrass Bukhari Road, Sector H-8/1, Islamabad and is reachable over the phone at +92519101256-8

=== PCSW helpline ===
The Punjab Women's Toll-Free Helpline 1043 and online complaint form is available 24/7. Managed and supervised by PCSW, this helpline team comprises all-women call agents, three legal advisors, psychosocial counselor, supervisors and management staff to address inquiries and complaints, and to provide psycho social counseling, on workplace harassment, gender discrimination, property disputes and inheritance rights, domestic violence and other women's issues.

=== AGHS Legal Aid Cell ===
AGHS provides legal aid in the violation of human rights by the state or non- state actors, women in obtaining their rights under family law and to women and children, and other victims of the abuse of due process and in prisons to women and juveniles. Email us: aghs@brain.net.pk | Call: 042-35842256-7

=== SLACC Helpline ===
The Sindh Legal Advisory Call Centre provides free of cost legal advice on civil, criminal, public service related matters. on toll free number 0800-70806. The service may be available to anyone in Pakistan.

=== DRF Helpline ===
Digital Rights Foundation's cyber harassment helpline is toll-free helpline for victims of online harassment and violence. The helpline provides a free service on its toll-free number 0800-39393 everyday from 9:00 a.m. to 5:00 p.m and over email at helpdesk@digitalrightsfoundation.pk.

=== Rozan Helpline ===
Rozan, an Islamabad-based non-profit works on issues related to emotional and psychological health, gender, violence against women and children, and psychological and reproductive health of adolescents. It provides free counseling over the phone on toll free number 0800–22444 and regular number 0303-4442288 from Monday to Saturday, between 10:00 am to 6:00 pm.

== See also ==
- Women related laws in Pakistan
