= 1983 women's march, Lahore =

Feminist protest

On 12 February 1983, a women's march was held in Lahore, Pakistan. The march was led by the Women's Action Forum (WAF) and the Punjab Women Lawyers Association. It assembled at Mall Road in Lahore to proceed toward the Lahore High Court in Pakistan to protest against the discriminatory Law of Evidence and other Hudood Ordinances. The marchers were tear gassed and baton charged by police injuring many women. 50 of the marchers were arrested for defying the prohibition of public assembly that was in force. Pakistan's National Women's Day has been held officially on this day, in commemoration, since declared in 2012.

== Baton-charge incident ==
Hina Jilani planned for the marchers to reach the Lahore Highcourt premises in small groups of two to three. However, Hall road was cordoned off by the police. At Hall Road, Habib Jalib started reading his poetry and one of the protesters, Mubaraka, of the Democratic Women's Association managed to slip through the cordon and signaled other activists to follow her. The police tear gassed and baton-charged the protestors. Madeeha Gauhar was hit by a baton and many of the protesting women were arrested.

The prime cause for the demonstration was the proposed law of evidence, which intended to reduce the value of testimony of women to half of that of men. According to Anita M. Weiss, protesting women were afraid that women may be hindered from testifying in certain kind of hudud cases (like if a woman is sole witness to husband's or father's killing) and that their testimony in other cases will turn inconsequential unless corroborated by another woman. This was compounded by General Zia regime's moves to reduce women's rights using Pakistan's Sharia laws which were called the Hudood ordinances. It was the first public demonstration by any group in defiance of the martial law of General Muhammad Zia Ul Haq.

The clergy Ulama declared the women's protest as an act of apostasy for not being as per scriptural mandate. According to Anis Haroon, when they held solidarity demonstrations at Jinnah Mausoleum in Karachi against the treatment given to women at the Lahore March, the police did not beat them but molvis claimed that their actions annulled nikah (marriages). Talbot says when women contested misinterpretations of the clergy the Ulama rejected their competence in interpreting the Islamic scripture for the women being trained in western law also.

=== Prominent participants ===
- Farida Shaheed
- Asma Jahangir
- Habib Jalib
- Hina Jillani
- Madeeha Gauhar
- Lala Rukh

== Reverberation ==
According to Rahat Imran, a documentary film 'Jaloos' narrated by then contemporary activist Mehnaz Rafi, records the 1988 procession and also recounts the continuation of protests each 12 February on the same route since 1983. According to Anita M. Weiss, due to continued protests by aggrieved women, the government had to delay implementation of contentious changes in the law for almost two years. Weiss says, the version of the law finally adopted devalued testimony of two women equaling to one man's testimony in financial matters and in other cases acceptance of single woman's testimony is left to the presiding magistrate's discretion. Rahat says the contemporary documentary 'Jaloos' lists legal changes enforced by Zia, including the Zina Hudud ordinance, and the Law of Evidence—eventually coded in October, 1984—which weakened and gravely affected women's legal rights and equal status as citizens, and since then has become matter of consistent agitation and opposition.

=== Media coverage in February 1983 ===
The Pakistani media coverage largely projected women's protest as negative, emphasizing stereotypical gender roles for women in Muslim society. Research revealed that except for few newspapers like The Muslim, most of the media coverage included anti-women clichés and rhetoric. The government-run NPT newspapers and also private news papers like Daily Nawa-i-Waqt were negative towards the empowered women's role.

Pakistan's print media, Government controlled and private, was heavily pressured by the biased gate keeping of the General Zia Ul Haq regime through agencies like the National Press Trust. A later study observed 42 media stories, out of which 16 were supportive and 26 were not. The supportive statements included 'women have been given all rights by the Constitution'; 'women should play their role in all fields'; 'Hadd laws are anti-women' and 'women should not be the targets of biased laws'. The non–supportive statements in the media included 'Islam does not permit women to go out of house'; 'Women's best role is in their homes' and 'women organizations are spreading vulgarity'.

According to Ayesha Khan, The Government of Pakistan owned news paper published news saying that some renowned ulema clergy declared that women's protests against Law of Evidence amount to be declaration of war against God's directions. Khan says there were some other Urdu and English news papers too published material terming protests to be sacrilegious, effectively closing doors on possibilities of open debate regarding the Islamic law.

== Legacy ==
Pakistan's National Women's Day is annually observed on February 12 to mark the first women's march in Pakistan against the Zia regime which was on 12 February 1983. The date was recognised by Pakistan's prime minister, Yousaf Raza Gillani, in 2012. According to The News International still there is long way to go and much remains to be done for gender equality, since getting better recognition to women's movement 1983 onward, Pakistani women have formed enduring civil society, advanced in academics at universities, and improved political presence, could get few discriminatory laws amended too. According to Ayesha Khan while discriminatory laws from Zia times are still on the statute but positive development is issues of women's rights are getting politicized and coming into focus since then.

== See also ==
- Women related laws in Pakistan#Law of Evidence
- Status of women's testimony in Islam

== Bibliography ==
- Imran, Rahat. Activist Documentary Film in Pakistan: The Emergence of a Cinema of Accountability. United Kingdom, Taylor & Francis, 2016.
- Khan, Ayesha. The Women's Movement in Pakistan: Activism, Islam and Democracy. United Kingdom, Bloomsbury Publishing, 2018.
- Weiss, Anita M.. Interpreting Islam, Modernity, and Women's Rights in Pakistan. United Kingdom, Palgrave Macmillan, 2014. Page 49.
- Omvedt, Gail. “Women in Governance in South Asia.” Economic and Political Weekly, vol. 40, no. 44/45, 2005, pp. 4746–52, JSTOR 4417361.
- Imran, R. (2005) 'Legal injustices: The Zina Hudood Ordinance of Pakistan and its implications for women', Journal of International Women's Studies, 7(2), pp. 78–100
- Jalal, A. (1991). The Convenience of Subservience: Women and the State of Pakistan. In: Kandiyoti, D. (eds) Women, Islam and the State. Palgrave Macmillan, London. https://doi.org/10.1007/978-1-349-21178-4_4
- Mumtaz, Khawar, and Shaheed, Farida. Women of Pakistan: two steps forward, one step back?. United Kingdom, Zed Books, 1987. archive.org
- Korson, J. Henry, and Michelle Maskiell. “Islamization and Social Policy in Pakistan: The Constitutional Crisis and the Status of Women.” Asian Survey, vol. 25, no. 6, 1985, pp. 589–612, https://doi.org/10.2307/2644377.
- Women's Movements in Asia: Feminisms and Transnational Activism. United Kingdom, Taylor & Francis, 2010. Page 167
- Khan, Noor Ullah. Human Rights Violations during Military Rule of General Zia ul Haq. Pakistan Journal of Criminology . Jul2018, Vol. 10 Issue 3, p106-118. 13p.

=== Further reading ===
- Two women still equal one man, The Express Tribune April 3, 2022
- Shah, Niaz A.. Women, the Koran and International Human Rights Law: The Experience of Pakistan. Netherlands, Martinus Nijhoff Publishers, 2006. Page 145
- Khan, Shahnaz. Zina and the Moral Regulation of Pakistani Women, Feminist Review, Volume: 75 issue: 1, page(s): 75–100, Issue published: December 1, 2003; Sage Journals, https://doi.org/10.1057/palgrave.fr.9400111
