= Tanveer Jahan =

Pakistani human rights defender and trainer

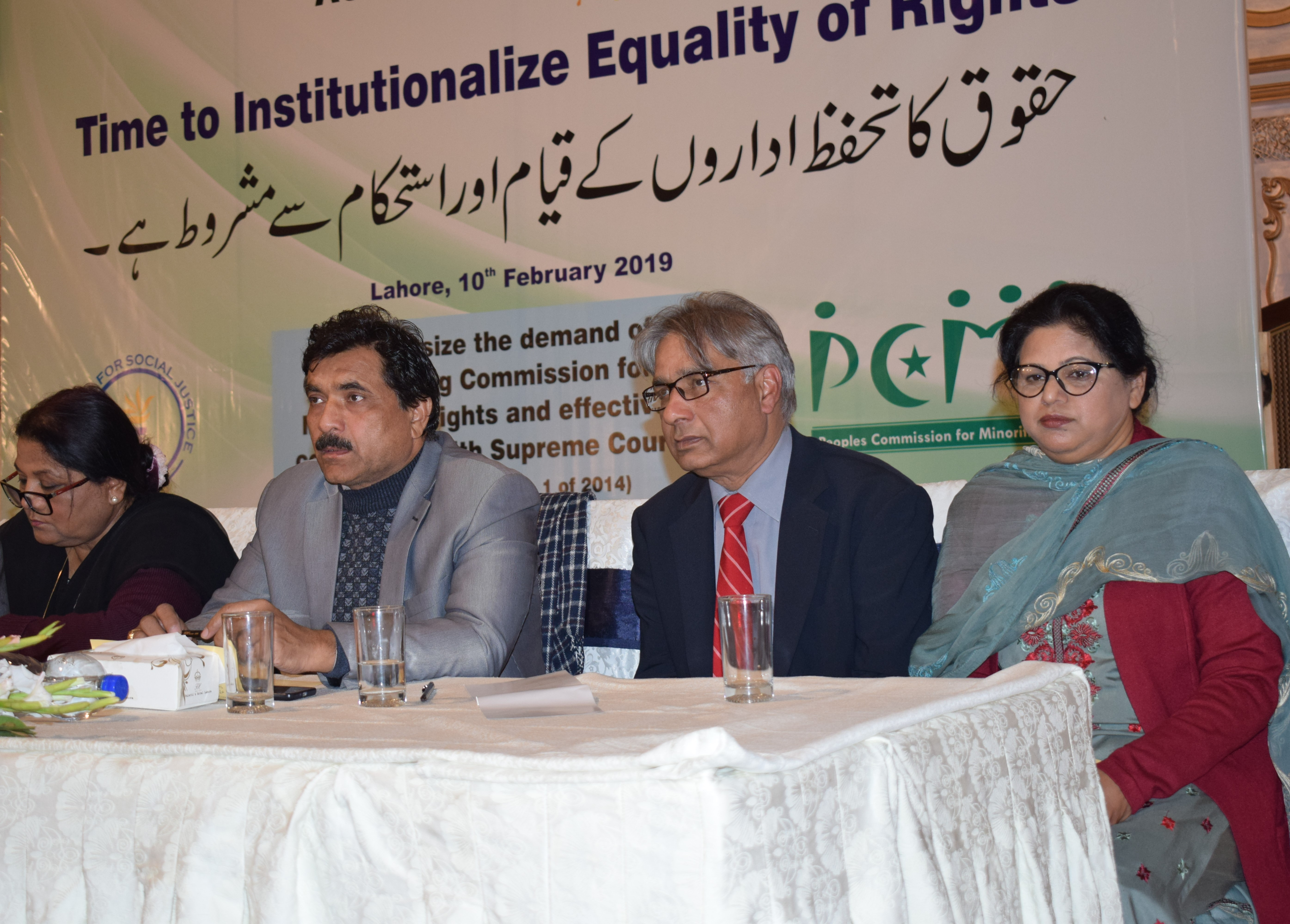
- Tanveer Jahan participates in a conference on equal rights on 10 February 2019
- Born: 14 April 1962 (age 64); Lahore, Pakistan
- Education: Master of Philosophy; University of Punjab (Pakistan)
- Occupations: Human rights defender; trainer
- Organization: Democratic Commission for Human Development
- Spouse: Wajahat Masood

Tanveer Jahan (Urdu: تنویر جہاں; born 14 April 1962) is a Pakistani human rights defender and trainer. Jahan has been associated with the social development sector in Pakistan for over 35 years. She serves as Executive Director at the Democratic Commission for Human Development, and as National Coordinator of the Pakistan Human Rights Defenders Network. She has served as a member at the National Commission on the Status of Women (NCSW).

== Early life, Education and Career ==
She was born and raised in Lahore, Pakistan. She completed her early education at Government High School and earned a post-graduation degree in Philosophy from the University of the Punjab. She married analyst and columnist Wajahat Masood. The couple has a daughter, Kamini (Kamini is a Sanskrit word and means beautiful lady).

She started taking part in the human rights movement for the restoration of democracy and gender equality as a student. In 1995 she started working with Human Rights Commission of Pakistan (an independent human rights body that engages in providing support to persecuted religious, gender and other minority groups). As a coordinator of the women's rights program, she engaged in fact-finding missions and provided evidence-based data on violation of women's rights to HRCP's annual report.

In 2003, she began serving as Executive Director of the Democratic Commission for Human Development, which engages in integrated initiatives in human rights education, research, and advocacy. She developed training modules on conflict resolution and prevention, human rights advocacy, child rights, women rights, and active citizenship. She contributed to making UN human rights treaties and declarations available in Urdu including; UDHR, ICCPR, ICESCR, CEDAW, CAT, CRC, Declaration of principles of tolerance, the Elimination of Intolerance and of Discrimination and many others.

She introduced a human rights course for secondary school students that helped expose children to concepts of human rights, non-discrimination and equality, citizenship, and tolerance. She worked to bring the human rights agenda to the development work of small community-based organizations, and has provided training to thousands of lawyers, journalists, and activists on themes such as; conflict analysis, conflict resolution, early warning systems, human rights and protection of human rights defenders.

She spoke out against child marriage, corporal punishment, child trafficking in the Gulf States, child abuse, custodial torture, death penalty, religious extremism, gender-based violence and has been pushing for an autonomous commission on children's rights, which was established in Pakistan in April 2020. She advocates for mainstreaming women's rights, effective women's political participation, equal rights of women and men, and endorses international women's day. While a member of the NCSW she was involved in panel discussions on religious minority rights, policy dialogues on pro-women laws and policies, and reports and research studies on women's rights.

She has joined campaigns and networks, and has led some of them, including the Child Rights Movement. She is a member of the Civil Society Working Group on GSP+, an advocacy group established to monitor Pakistan's compliance with international human rights commitments, and engage with stakeholders, including European Union governments, on key reforms required to meet the GSP+ conditions. She is a member of the Joint Action Committee for People's Rights, a platform of human rights organizations and defenders working across Pakistan to speak against human rights violations.

She worked with international organizations, and began working as Country Representative of Label Step, Switzerland in 2004. She served as a Consultant with Norwegian Human Rights Fund from 2003 to 2014. She has given talks and lectures on international forums on the theme such as women's rights and rights of human rights defenders.

She launched a campaign against degrading treatment and torture in 2013 under which a study on Pakistan's criminal justice system highlighted its obstacles to dispensation of justice. She launched a campaign for protection of human rights defenders and women-centric organizations in Pakistan in 2016 under which two studies assessed the challenges and threats they face.

She has served as the National Coordinator of the Pakistan Human Rights Defenders Network (PHRDN) since 2016, which is aimed at improving the skills of human rights defenders in analyzing risk assessment and capacity assessment and enables them to deal with risks and threats for their protection as well as their organizations’ security, and advocating for protection of human rights defenders' rights.

In 2018, along with other organizations, PHRDN consulted with the National Commission for Human Rights on the formulation of policy guidelines for the protection of human rights defenders in Pakistan. In 2019, it launched a research study assessing the economic, developmental and relational impact of policy for regulation of INGOs in Pakistan and the markers of national interest in the social sector.

== Publications ==
She has contributed to several publications on themes such as human rights and peacebuilding.

- What is advocacy?
- Using Media for human rights advocacy
- Training module on human rights activism
- Training module on Women's Rights
- Training module on Child Rights
- Training module on Religious Freedom & Minorities Rights
- Training module on conflict handling skills
- Study on Impact of compromise in murder cases

=== Articles ===
- Protecting child rights (Urdu)
- Ventilator gave me life (Urdu)
- Jallianwala Bagh massacre (Urdu)
- Bhagat Singh's statement in the Court (Urdu)
- Effects of violence on Women
- The sole voice: Women's rights activist, Nighat Said Khan
- Justice for women: too little and too slow

== See also ==
- Democratic Commission for Human Development
- Human Rights Commission of Pakistan
- National Commission on the Status of Women
