= National Commission on the Status of Women =

- قومی کمیشن برائے وقار نسواں
- Abbreviation: NCSW
- Formation: 2000
- Legal status: Statutory body of the Government of the Pakistan; Human rights institution
- Location: Islamabad, Pakistan
- Chairperson: NILOFAR BAKHTIAR
- Website: www.ncsw.gov.pk

National Commission on Status of Women (NCSW; Urdu: قومی کمیشن برائے وقار نسواں, romanized: Qaumi Kamition Baraye Waqar Naswan) is a Pakistani statutory body established by then President Pervez Musharraf, under Ordinance XXVI dated 17 July 2000. It is an outcome of the national and international commitments of the Government of Pakistan like the Beijing Declaration and Platform for Action, 1995; and the National Plan of Action (NPA) for Women, 1998.

The main objective of the Commission is the emancipation of women, equalization of opportunities and socio-economic conditions amongst women and men, and elimination of all sorts of discrimination against women.

== Functions and mandate ==
The main functions of the NCSW include the examination of the policy, programs, and other measures taken by the Pakistani Government for women's development and the review of all policies, laws, rules, and regulations affecting the status and rights of women and gender equality in accordance with the Constitution. Other focus areas of the NCSW include violence against women and the needs of rural working women.

NCSW was formed with the intention of examining policies, programs, and laws that affect women's development and gender equality. The commission strives to build and maintain relationships with NGOs and other experts in order to effectively protect women's rights. NCSW mainly works and lobbies with lawmakers, parliamentarians and other decision-makers for promotion of laws and regulations aimed at empowering women in the social, economic and political spheres.

== Background ==
Two short term commissions were formed in 1976 and 1983 by then government of Pakistan that undertook an analysis of women's status in the country, identifying issues and gaps, and making recommendations to address them. Women's rights activists and organisations raised a demand in the 1980s for establishing a permanent commission that could pursue making of laws, policies and interventions for women's rights and monitor their implementation. Finally, the official National Commission on the Status of Women was formed through a presidential ordinance in 2000, however it was given statutory powers under the NCSW Act 2012 with an expanded scope and mandate.

The National Commission on the Status of Women Act, 2012 was passed by the parliament to establish a statutory body with a broad mandate and powers to carry out inquiry of women's rights violations. The National Commission on the Status of Women (Amendment) Act, 2018 was adopted by the parliament to ensure that the new chairperson of NCSW would be elected within 30 days after the retirement of the incumbent head. This law provides a time frame for the appointment of the chairperson in order to make the commission more effective. In 2013, NCSW gained administrative and financial autonomy to run its affairs effectively.

Since 2002, all chairpersons have served for at least one term of three-years including Justice (Retd.) Majida Rizvi, Dr. Arfa Sayeda Zehra, and Anis Haroon. However, Khawar Mumtaz remained in the office for two consecutive terms i.e. 2013–2019. Six commissions served out their terms and cycled through different chairpersons, and the commission is currently on its seventh term which started with the appointment of its 12 members from all administrative units of Pakistan in June 2020.

== Membership ==
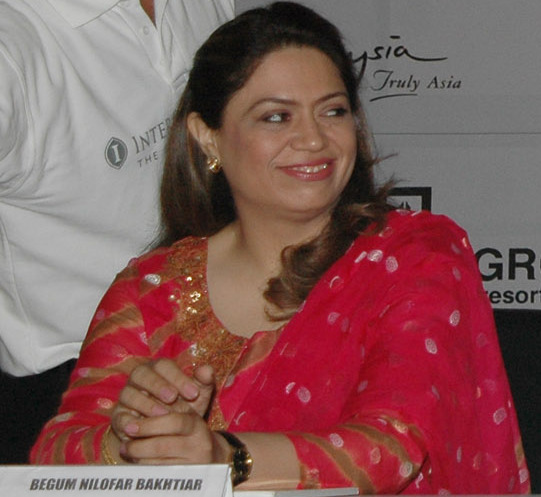
Nilofar Bakhtiar

NCSW is composed of a Chairperson and thirteen independent members, preferably women, two each from four provinces Punjab, Sindh, Balochistan and Khyber Pakhtunkhwa, one each from Federally Administered Tribal Areas, Azad Jammu and Kashmir, Gilgit Baltistan and Islamabad Capital Territory, and one representative the religious minority communities, as well as representatives of each provincial commissions on the status of women, and five ex-officio members representing different government ministries including; Law, Finance, Foreign Affairs, Interior, Human Rights. The Chairperson and the members are appointed for a term of three years.

Chairpersons
No	Name	From	To
1.	Dr. Shaheen Sardar Ali	1 September 2000	22 July 2001
2.	Dr. Faqir Hussain (Acting)	23 July 2001	6 March 2002
3.	Justice (Rtd.) Majida Rizvi	7 March 2002	7 March 2005
4.	Dr. Arfa Sayeda Zehra	2 February 2006	1 January 2009
5.	Anis Haroon	25 January 2009	26 March 2012
6.	Khawar Mumtaz (1st term)	1 January 2013	31 December 2015
7.	Khawar Mumtaz (2nd term)	31 October 2016	30 October 2019
8.	Nilofar Bakhtiar	28 July 2021	Present

Current members (June 2020 – June 2023)
No	Name	Province/Areas/Other
1.	Sahibzadi Madiha Sultan	Azad Jammu and Kashmir
2.	Fatima Iqbal	Balochistan
3.	Rehana Bibi Khilji	Balochistan
4.	Sosan Aziz	Gilgit Baltistan
5.	Rubina Naz	Khyber Pakhtunkhwa
6.	Asiya Azeem	Islamabad Capital Territory
7.	Dr. Kanwal Afridi	Khyber Pakhtunkhwa
8.	Shaista Bukhari	Punjab
9.	Ruhi Syed	Punjab
10.	Habiba Hasan	Sindh
11.	Haya Emaan Zahid	Sindh
12.	Prof. (Dr.) Sarah Safdar	Khyber Pakhtunkhwa / Minority Member

=== Former Members ===
2016 – October 2019
No	Name	Province/Areas/Other
1.	Fatima Iqbal	Azad Jammu and Kashmir (AJK)
2.	Maria Iqbal Tarana	Chairperson, Azad Jammu and Kashmir (AJK) Commission on the Status of Women (AJKCSW)
3.	Sana Durrani	Balochistan
4.	Rukhsana Ahmed Ali	Balochistan
5.	Ali Begum	FATA
6.	Bibi Nabat Ali	Gilgit Baltistan
7.	Dr. Huma Qureshi	Islamabad
8.	Mossarat Qadeem	Islamabad
9.	Dr. Maryam Bibi	Khyber Pakhtunkhwa
10.	Neelum Toru	Chairperson, Khyber Pakhtunkhwa Commission on the Status of Women (KPCSW)
11.	Sohail Akbar Warraich	Punjab
12	Farida Shaeed	Punjab
13.	Fauzia Viqar	Chairperson, Punjab Commission on the Status of Women (PCSW)
14.	Kausar S. Khan	Sindh
15.	Dr. Misbah Bibi Qureshi	Sindh
16.	Dr. Misbah Bibi Qureshi	Sindh
17.	Kalpna Devi	Sindh / Minority Member

=== Former Members ===
(2013–2016)
No	Name	Province/Areas/Other
1.	Nusrat Shaheen	Azad Jammu and Kashmir (AJK)
2.	Kishwar Naheed	Islamabad Capital Territory
3.	Zainab Azmat	FATA
4.	Sadia Danish	Gilgit Baltistan
5.	Justice (R) Mehta Kailash Nath Kohli	Balochistan
6.	Shereen Gul	Balochistan
7.	Zubaida Noor	Khyber Pakhtunkhwa
8.	Sadia Qasim Shah	Khyber Pakhtunkhwa
9.	Uzma Noorani	Sindh
10.	Muhammad Jan Odhano	Sindh
11.	Saira Afzal Tarar	Punjab
12	Tanveer Jahan	Punjab
13.	Najmi Saleem	Punjab / Minority member

== Initiatives and key engagements ==
In January 2018, NCSW arranged the launch of an Urdu poetry book written by a domestic worker in order to encourage young women writers.

In March 2018, NCSW's chairperson participated in a launch of the Gender Equality in Public Administration in Pakistan Case Study carried out by UNDP and UN Women that analyzed women's representation and access to decision-making roles in the civil service, and presented recommendations to address barriers to gender equality in public administration.

In July 2018, NCSW and the UN Women Pakistan launched a report on the Status of Rural Women in Pakistan, which highlights opportunities and obstacles to rural women face in the development and provides a set of recommendations for action by government, civil society, and donors that can enhance their economic and social wellbeing. The report states that rural women mainly engaged in farming, livestock management, and fisheries, mostly as unpaid (60pc) contributing family workers and earn less from their livestock or on low wages. Their multidimensional work is not acknowledged as the lines between work for economic gain and work as an extension of household chores are blurred and need to be recognized.

In July 2018, NCSW in collaboration with Election Commission of Pakistan (ECP) established an Early Warning System in low turn-out areas of women to take action against the parties responsible by reporting it immediately to ECP to deal with the factors that bar them from voting or from running for office. According to an estimate by NCSW, even if 5,000 new ID cards are issued to women every day, it will take 18 years to bridge the gap between men and women voters.

In January 2019, NCSW's rules were incorporated to let men employees avail leaves of 10 days with full pay and allowances to take care of their wives and newborns as federal government had approved 10 days of paternity leave for government employees in October 2012.

In October 2019, NCSW servering as secretariat of IPMG, organized 4th meeting of Inter-Provincial Ministerial Group (IPMG) for empowerment of Women where the participants reiterated the resolve to ensure the provision of equal rights for all citizens without any discrimination, and reaffirmed international commitments of Pakistan, including the Convention on the Elimination of all Forms of Discrimination Against Women (CEDAW), the Beijing Platform for Action and the Sustainable Development Goals (SDGs), which promote women's empowerment and rights, women's political representation and women's protection against violence. They stressed recognizing the implementation role of Women Development Departments and the monitoring role of the women rights commissions and the Ministry of Human Rights as the national machinery for the advancement of women and gender equality.

In November 2019, NCSW's Chairperson Khawar Mumtaz and Higher Education Commission (HEC), Dr Tariq Banuri, entered into an agreement for setting up a Public Library and Women's Museum in Islamabad to support education, research, and training on women's roles and contributions to the country's progress.

In 2020, NCSW and UN Women Pakistan initiated the development of a National Gender Data Portal with the technical support by National University of Sciences & Technology (NUST), will help improve the data collection, data compiling, production and use of standardized data for effective implementation, monitoring and reporting of the international commitments on gender equality including; UN international CEDAW and the SDGs to which Pakistan is a state party. The collation of data collected from provinces will address the issue of lack of reliable, comprehensive, and consistent national data on gender and the status of women in Pakistan, whereas the data analysis will be instrumental for improving gender mainstreaming in legislative, policy and programmatic interventions using an evidence-based approach and guiding the informed policy and inclusive response on gender equality.

Law and policy committee of NCSW reviewed several drafts of laws that affect the status and rights of women, provided its input and submitted comments, observations and recommendations to the concerned ministry or committee for incorporation. They include; Reproductive Health Care Bill, Domestic Violence Bill, Christian Marriage and Divorce Bill, Hindu Marriage Bill, Qisas and Diyat Bill, Juvenile Justice System Bill; Cyber Crime Bill; Anti-Rape Bill, and Jirga Bill.

In April 2020, NCSW, Ministry of Human Rights and UN Women Pakistan released a policy paper on Gendered Impact and Implications of Covid-19 in Pakistan. The paper presents a comprehensive analysis of the adverse impact that pandemic has on the lives and livelihoods of vulnerable women, keeping the focus on key thematic areas including education, health, labour force participation, time use and mobility, financial empowerment, and gender-based violence, and policy recommendations to mitigate immediate risks and prevent the exacerbation of existing gender gaps.

In July 2020, NCSW and UN women Pakistan launched Young Women in Pakistan: Status Report 2020 according to which 29% of young married women face controlling behaviors by husbands, 15% of them have experienced physical violence and 4% have exposed to sexual violence by anyone other than spouse, while 14% of currently married women have faced spousal physical violence and 4% have faced spousal sexual violence during last 12 months.

=== Researchers ===
Dr. Anita M. Weiss

== Current status and controversy ==
According to the NCSW Act, the government is bound to appoint NCSW's members within thirty days of occurrence of a vacancy. However, NCSW's chairperson has not been appointed though the tenure of its preceding chairperson Khawar Mumtaz expired in October 2019.

According to the law, the Prime Minister and Leader of the Opposition in the National Assembly mutually shortlist three names for the position of Chairperson, and forward them to a Parliamentary Committee for making a final selection. In case of lack of consensus between the Leader of the House and the Opposition, a Parliamentary Committee, with equal representation from the treasury and opposition benches of the Senate and National Assembly, constituted by the Speaker of the National Assembly, forward the name of the confirmed nominee to the Prime Minister of Pakistan, for appointment.

Professor Dr. Meher Taj Roghani is serving as the Chairperson of the 12-member Parliamentary Committee set up for the Appointment of the Chairperson of the NCSW.

== Publications ==
A number of research reports have been published by the commission. These reports play a significant role in ensuring new legislation and decision making at the policy level, thus contributing to the betterment of women in society. Some of the notable research reports include "Access to Justice for survivors of Sexual Assault- A Pilot Study", "Standardized Indicators Violence Against Women in Pakistan", Women's Rights of Inheritance and its Implementation, Women Violence against Jirgas and Aurat Tari Khani.

== See also ==
- Women in Pakistan
- Women related laws in Pakistan
