= Nighat Said Khan =

Pakistani feminist and women's rights activist

Nighat Said Khan (Urdu: نگہت سعید خان) is a Pakistani feminist activist, researcher and author. She is the director and founder of the Applied Socio-Economic Research (ASR) Resource Centre and a founding member of the Women's Action Forum.

== Early life ==
Khan spent her childhood between Pakistan and United States, in addition to moving to London for her A levels, before moving to New York City for her undergraduate degree from Columbia University in the 1960s. During her time at university, she became involved with the anti-Vietnam war movement and the women's rights movement. She returned to Pakistan in 1974 and has largely spent her time there since then. Upon returning, she became involved with the Democratic Women's Association which agitated against the Pakistan military's suppression in East Pakistan.

In an interview with the Herald in 2017 she revealed that her father was in the Pakistan Army while she was growing up, however this did not deter her from joining a student's movement against Ayub Khan at the same time when her father was a martial law administrator. She cites women's rights activist Tahira Mazhar Ali and her husband Mazhar Ali Khan as early influences.

== Political activism ==
Nighat is perhaps most well known as a founding member of the Women's Action Forum (WAF). She was part of the February 12, 1983 (also referred to as National Women's Day in Pakistan) in Lahore against then-General Ziaul Haq's amendment to the law of evidence with the aim of reducing women's testimony to half that of men's.

Nighat is outspoken on issues concerning the left, with a focus on women's role in the economic-social-political order. Through her work and activism, she has also spoken out about issues of sexuality, female desire and critiqued traditional forms of family. In an interview with Herald she stated: "I have kept bringing up the issue of sexuality and the sexual control of women with other women rights organisations. Whether it is women’s mobility or their marriages, it is women’s sexuality and agency that is controlled. Women’s bodies personify the symbols and markers of identity. Women carry and are meant to perpetuate religions, culture, tradition and, most importantly, lineage. Their sexual 'purity' ensures continuity of the bloodline of the family and the community."

== Research and work ==
Nighat has worked with Professor Eric Cyprian at Shah Hussain College, Lahore, and later at the Quaid-e-Azam University, Islamabad in the 1970s. She was removed from her position at the latter because of her leftist political beliefs.

She established Applied Socio-Economic Research (ASR) in 1983 which is the first feminist publishing house in Pakistan and self-identifies as "a multidisciplinary, multidimensional group working towards social transformation." She is the dean of studies of the Institute of Women's Studies Lahore (IWSL), which is a South Asian post-graduate teaching and training programme.

Nighat has worked on several publications, often collaborating with other local feminists, including "Some Questions on Feminism & Its Relevance in South Asia" with Kamla Bhasin and "Unveiling the issues : Pakistani women's perspectives on social, political and ideological issues" along with Afiya Sheherbano Zia. She has contributed chapters including "The Women's Movement Revisited: Areas of concern for the future"; "Identity, Violence and Women: A Reflection on the Partition of India 1947".
