= Khalid Khan =

Khalid Khan is the name of:

- Khalid Khan (Hong Kong cricketer) (born 1971), Hong Kong cricketer
- Khalid Khan (politician), Pakistani politician
- Khalid Amir Khan (1934–2020), Pakistani diplomat and politician
- Khalid Jawed Khan, Pakistani lawyer, Attorney General of Pakistan
- Khalid Khan, Pakistani bassist in alternative rock band Aaroh

== See also ==
- Khaled Khan (1958–2013), for the Bangladeshi actor
