= Satnam Mahmood =

Pakistani journalist

- Born: Satnam Kaur; 16 October 1921; Lahore, Punjab, British India
- Died: October 1995 (aged 78–79); Islamabad, Pakistan
- Other name: Nama
- Education: Harvard University
- Occupations: Radio broadcaster Journalist
- Spouse: Mahmood Ali Khan
- Children: Shahla Zia
- Parents: Charan Singh (father); Sakina Singh (mother)

Satnam Mahmood (16 October 1921 – October 1995), also referred to as Satnam Mahmood Kaur and Nama, was a Pakistani radio broadcaster, public administrator, women's rights activist, and educationist.

== Biography ==
Satnam Mahmood was born Satnam Kaur in the city of Lahore in 1921 to Charan Singh, a novelist and journalist, and Sakina Singh. She was married to Mahmood Ali Khan, a progressive independence activist. Her husband was the uncle of writer Tariq Ali. After the establishment of Pakistan as an independent country, Mahmood became one of the first women to join the newly formed Pakistani civil service. The service sent her to Harvard University as part of her training, where she received a Ph.D. in education. Mahmood Ali Khan died in 1961. Shehla Zia, Mahmood's daughter, and Maliha Zia Lari, one of her granddaughters, are also prominent women's rights activists.

Mahmood began working as a radio broadcaster in 1941, working in All-India Radio’s studio in Lahore. She became known for her broadcasts in Punjabi. As a broadcaster, she was referred to by the nickname "Nama". She also worked for the government, in areas related to women's education. She wrote multiple books on public administration. She taught at the Administrative Staff College, and also gave lectures elsewhere. After her husband's death, Mahmood discontinued broadcasting, and focused on women's rights activism. She played a role in setting up an organisation called the Women’s Action Forum. She died of heart failure in Islamabad in October 1995.
