= Zohra Yusuf =

Pakistani advertiser and activist

- Born: 2 May 1950 (age 75); India
- Education: Holy Cross College, Dhaka, East Pakistan now in Bangladesh
- Occupations: Chairperson, Human Rights Commission of Pakistan (2011-2017)

Zohra Yusuf (born 2 May 1950) is an advertising professional, an activist and a journalist who is lauded for her work in women's rights, human rights and media. She is the former chairperson of the Human Rights Commission of Pakistan (HRCP).

== Education ==
Zohra graduated from Holy Cross College, Dhaka, East Pakistan (now Bangladesh).

== Career ==
After graduating, Zohra Yusuf started working at MNJ Communications as an advertiser. She worked at MNJ from 1971-1981. In June 1981, she joined The Star, (a publication of the Dawn Media Group)as editor of its weekend magazine. She joined Spectrum Communication Y&R as creative director in 1986. She later became a chief creative officer of Y&R. Yusuf was a council member of the Asia Pacific Forum on Women, Law and Development for six years. She has also served as a bureau member of the South Asia Forum for Human Rights organization and was a board member of the Commonwealth Human Rights Initiative for seven years.

In 1988, Yusuf joined the Human Rights Commission of Pakistan (HRCP); a non-profit member organization of the International Federation for Human Rights (FIDH). In 1990, she was elected council member and served as vice-chairperson as well as secretary-general. In 2011, Yusuf was elected the chairperson of HRCP. Yusuf was also elected Vice President of FIDH in 2013. She was re-elected co-chairperson of HRCP for the 2014–17 term. Yusuf is also a freelance writer and has contributed to many books, journals and newspapers on topics such as media and conflict resolution, feminism and women's rights.

=== Activism ===
Zohra Yusuf is an advocate of human rights and media. She is particularly known for her advocacy for women's rights and her associations with women organizations.

In 1979, Yusuf joined the Shirkat Gah; an organization created for women's rights in 1975. This was where Yusuf started her work in activism. Joining the Shirkat Gah, Yusuf became one of the founding members of Women's Action Forum (WAF), an organization created for women's rights. The WAF started in 1981, when the judgement in the Fehmida-Allah Buksh case was announced under the Hudood Ordinance rule during the Zia regime.

The man (Allah Buksh) was sentenced to be stoned to death and the woman (Fehmida), who was a minor, was awarded 100 lashes in public. The judgement brought different women organizations together, namely Shirkat Gah, Tehrik-e-Niswan, All Pakistan Democratic Women's Association, APWA. The organizations formed a coalition and the Women's Action Forum (WAF) was created. Yusuf along with other activists, participated in the WAF meetings and protests organized in Lahore. She also published articles in The Star newspaper, decrying the verdict.

Yusuf has also published many articles on media censorship, women's rights and human rights in the Dawn and The Express Tribune newspapers.

== Awards ==
Zohra Yusuf received the All Pakistan Newspapers Society award in 2011 for "TV Channels or Electronic Pulpits", featured in Newsline.
