= Arfana Mallah =

Pakistani scientist and activist

- عرفانہ ملاح
- Born: Pakistani
- Occupations: Academics,. Professor of Chemistry in Sindh University, Jamshoro
- Known for: Activism, Leader and founding member of Women's Action Forum

Arfana Mallah (Urdu: عرفانہ ملاح) is a Pakistani human rights activist, leader of the Women's Action Forum and a professor of chemistry at the University of Sindh, Jamshoro, Sindh, Pakistan.

== Education ==
Arfana Begum Mallah received a master's degree in chemistry from Quaid-i-Azam University Islamabad in 1998, an M.Phil. in analytical Chemistry in 2002 and a PhD in chemistry in 2012 from the University of Sindh at Jamshoro.

== Career ==
As of 2023, Mallah is a professor at the Dr. M. A. Kazi institute of Chemistry, University of Sindh at Jamshoro.

Mallah has been active in teachers' trades unionism since she joined the University of Sindh as a lecturer. She was the first elected female General Secretary of Sindh University Teachers association (SUTA) and was re-elected for a record further four terms of office. She was also elected as a member of Sindh University syndicate twice and was the first female elected member of it.

She writes columns in Sindhi language dailies and has been hosting talk shows at different TV channels for two decades, her book about stories of internally displaced women has been published in Sindhi and Urdu .

== Activism ==
Mallah is a women's rights activist. She and Amar Sindhu started a chapter of Women's Action Forum (WAF) in Hyderabad in 2008.

In 2012, Mallah was attacked by gunmen when she was traveling with Sindhu. They alleged this was a response to them protesting against the vice chancellor, who they claimed was involved in murders of at least five people on the campus.

On December 10, 2014, when Malala Yousafzai shared the Nobel Peace Prize with Indian Kailash Satyarthi, Mallah urged the government to declare December 10 as 'Malala Day' and to organize a country-wide celebration.

In 2015, Mallah organized the ‘Stop killing women’ campaign in Hyderabad via the WAF. The campaign issued a report, "WAF’s social FIR", which mentioned crimes against women in Sindh in 2014 and 2015. The report claimed that hundreds of women were killed in different cases of kidnapping, gang rapes, honour killing, domestic violence, sexual assault and suicides.

She wrote a series of short stories about women who had been displaced in the 2010 Pakistan floods which were published in the Sindhi daily newspaper Daily Kawish.

Mallah has been part of the Programme Management Committee of the Khanabadosh Writers’ Cafe opened in 2015, in Sindh Museum, Hyderabad, as a place to promote free thought and pluralism. She organized a week long, literary programme called Ayaz Festival, about the poet Shaikh Ayaz at the Cafe with her team in December, 2015.

In 2019 and 2020, on International Women's Day (8 March), Mallah organized and led the Aurat Azadi March (Women's Freedom March) in Sindh.

For the last twenty years, Mallah and Sindhu have faced threats from men in academia and landlords due to their activism.

In 2020, the International Federation for Human Rights issued an urgent appeal for intervention in a smear campaign against Mallah. After two weeks of harassment, she was forced to issue a public apology.
