= Amar Sindhu =

Pakistani writer (born 1968)

- امر سندھو
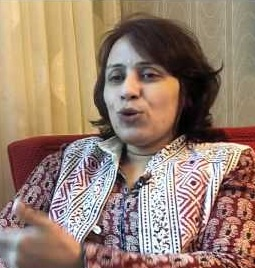
- Born: Salma Laghari; 28 August 1968 (age 58); Mirpur Khas District, Sindh, Pakistan
- Occupations: Academic, poet, author
- Known for: Assistant professor of philosophy in Sindh University, Jamshoro, Leader of Women's Action Forum

Salma Laghari, better known as Amar Sindhu (Urdu: امر سندھو, Sindhi: امر سنڌو) (born 28 August 1968) is a Pakistani author, poet, activist and academic.

== Early life and education ==
Sindhu's real name is Salma Laghari. She was born to Hussain Bukhsh Laghari on 28 August 1968 in village Dodo Laghari, Mirpur Khas District, Sindh, Pakistan. She holds two master's degrees and an LLB degree.

== Career ==
Sindhu is an assistant professor of philosophy at Sindh University Jamshoro. She is also a Sindhi-language poet.

== Activism ==
As a human rights and civil society activist, Sindhu has been involved in a number of issues including the rights of minorities, women, violence. She has also been a part of fact-finding teams on human rights issues. As a socialist feminist and women's rights activist, she is an active and founding member of Women's Action Forum. In 2012, she suffered minor injuries when she was shot while traveling to Karachi, Sindhu led the "Aurat Azadi March" (Women's Freedom March) in Sukkur on March 8, 2020, held on Women's Day 2020. Sindhu along with Arfana Mallah started chapter of Women's Action Forum in Hyderabad in 2008. Sindhu was inspired by Sabeen Mahmud's T2F in Karachi, and she along with Haseen Shah and Arfana Malah started the "Khanabadosh Writers Cafe" at the Sindh Museum to offer a space where intellectuals and creative people from Hyderabad and other areas of Sindh can engage in intellectual discussions. In 2015, she organised the "Ayaz Festival" to celebrate the life of the Sindhi poet Shaikh Ayaz (1923–1997). Those who paid homage included veteran politician Rasool Bux Palijo and writer, Noorul Huda Shah. In 2015, the Cafe also hosted a tribute to Hassan Mujtaba, a poet and journalist.

== Articles and publications ==
Sindhu is a writer and political analyst. She has written as a columnist in Dawn News and Humsub. She has written many articles in English, Urdu and Sindhi. Her work has been translated into the German language.

She also published a magazine named Adrish on social, political and cultural issues.

Sindhu is the author of a bilingual book of poetry book Ojagiyal Akhyun Ja Sapna, and "Jaagti Ankho Kay Sapnay". Sindhu has written many articles about the poetry of Shaikh Ayaz, a legendary poet of Sindh.
