= Women's Action Forum =

Women's Action Forum (WAF)
- خواتين محاذ عمل
- Formation: September 1981; 45 years ago
- Type: Women's organisation
- Purpose: Protecting women's rights, Advocacy, Media attention, direct-appeal campaigns, lobbying
- Location: Sindh, Pakistan
- Website: www.wafkarachi.com//

Women's Action Forum (Urdu: خواتين محاذ عمل, WAF) is a women's rights organisation in Pakistan.

== History ==
Women's Action Forum (WAF) was established in Karachi in September, 1981. The 15 women who founded the group were: Farida Sher, Samina Rehman, Najma Sadeque (1943- 2015) (founder of Shirkat Gah), Rukhsana Rashid, Ghazala Rahman Rafiq, Farida Shaheed (head of Shirkat Gah), Fareeha Zafar, Aban Marker Kabraji, Zohra Yusuf (member Shirkat Gah), Nighat Said Khan (founder of Applied Socio-Economic Resource Center-ASR), Humaira Rehman, Sultanat Bokhari, Khawar Mumtaz, Hilda Saeed (member Shirkat Gah), Lala Rukh (1948 – 2017), Nigar Ahmed (1945 – 2017) and Nasreen Azhar. Some of the 15 women were associated with Lahore Grammar School, National College of Arts and NGOs like Simorgh, Society for Advancement of Education (SAHE) and Aurat Foundation. Other organisations which endorsed the charter of WAF included Democratic Women's Association, Tehrik-e-Niswan, Shirkat Gah, Pakistan Women Lawyers' Association, All Pakistan Women's Association and later on Sindhiani Tahreek.

The WAF was formed to respond to the implementation of the Hudood Ordinance penal code and to strengthen women's position in society generally. The purpose of WAF was to increase women’s knowledge about their rights, status, and laws which institutionally weaken them. This was accomplished through workshops, meetings, media-publicity, and lobbying. Women from civil society organisations in Karachi became the founding members of the WAF which has later been joined by chapters from Lahore (Punjab) and Islamabad (Capital of Pakistan) soon within a period of one year. In Karachi, Lahore, Islamabad, Hyderabad, Peshawar and Quetta the group agreed on collective leadership and formulated policy statements and engaged in political action to safeguard women's legal position.

== Famous members ==
Nigar Ahmed (1945 – 2017) started the Islamabad and Lahore chapters in 1982. Amar Sindhu along with Arfana Mallah started chapter of Women's Action Forum (WAF) in Hyderabad in 2008. Since then they are actively working with WAF. Afiya Shehrbano Zia, famous feminist researcher is an active member of WAF, from Karachi.

== See also ==
- All Pakistan Women's Association
- Aurat Foundation
- Tehrik-e-Niswan
- Democratic Women's Association
- Sindhiani Tahreek
- Shirkat Gah
- Pakistan Women Lawyers' Association
- Women Democratic Front
- Aurat March
- Feminism in Pakistan
- Women in Pakistan
- Women's rights
- National women's day (Pakistan)
