= Bilquis Sheikh =

Pakistani author and Christian missionary

Begum Bilquis Sheikh (12 December 1912 – 9 April 1997) was a Pakistani author and Christian missionary. She was a prominent member of a Muslim family of Wah in Attock and known throughout the country for her political and social work. She is known for her high-profile conversion from Islam to Christianity, following a series of visions and prophetic dreams. She told her life story in the book, I Dared To Call Him Father. Published in 1978, the book is a classic in Christian literature and evangelism. Worldwide sales exceed 300,000. Her autobiography was one of the most popular Muslim-to-Christianity conversion books of the 20th century. It has been printed numerous times, in several different languages around the world. A 25th Anniversary edition was released by Baker Publishing Group in 2003.

== Background ==
Begum Bilquis was born on 12 December 1912, in Rawalpindi, close to her small ancestral village of Wah in northern Punjab, Pakistan. Her father was Nawab Muzaffar Ali Khan, a Punjabi feudal landlord and autocrat and a cousin of the prominent Punjabi statesman and Premier Sir Sikandar Hayat Khan. She was, thus, the elder sister of the Pakistani journalist Mazhar Ali Khan and aunt of writer Tariq Ali. She is also the mother of ambassador Khalid Amir Khan. Her family is one of the feudal elite of South Asia and have long held political power in the Punjab region. Sheikh was very wealthy, well-known, and highly respected throughout the country. Throughout the first 46 years of her life, Sheikh neither embraced nor rejected her Muslim faith, choosing to only believe in that which she could either see or explain.

She became active in political, diplomatic, and social work, following her marriage to General Khalid Masud Sheikh, who was a high-ranking government official, serving as the Interior Minister of Pakistan from 1962 to 1965.

== Religious conversion ==
In 1966, following the death of her parents and dissolution of her marriage, Sheikh left her homes in London, Paris and Rawalpindi and returned to her family's ancestral land in Wah, located at the foothills of the Himalayan Mountains. She lived on a large estate with many servants, yet became a virtual recluse, alone and disappointed over the abandonment by her husband. Discontented with her life, she began reading the Quran in depth, searching for hope and a higher purpose in her life. During her study, she began noticing that Jesus was mentioned in several places within the Muslim scriptures and thought that reading his teachings might be beneficial. Unfamiliar with the life of Jesus, she began researching further, turning to other sources that were referenced in the text. She asked her chauffeur, who was a Christian man, to bring her a Christian Bible, which he did.

Sheikh was intrigued by biblical passages that were alien to her Muslim faith and became drawn to research further. As she read the Bible alongside of the Quran, she began questioning her beliefs. She felt a sense of peace when she read the Bible, but was puzzled that she did not experience these same feelings when reading the Islamic texts. In response to her questions, she approached the home of some local American missionaries, David and Synnøve Mitchell, where she learned of Christianity for the first time. She said that that night, she began experiencing a series of dreams and visions about John the Baptist; and God as the Father, as Jesus the Son, and as the Holy Spirit. These dreams contradicted the teachings of Islam, where she was taught that the trinity was merely Christian heresy.

Sheikh adopted her grandson, Mahmud, when his divorced mother remarried, opting to leave him behind with her. When the favored grandson began experiencing pain in his ear, she took him to a Christian hospital near Taxila. A Catholic nun, who was the doctor, noticed that Sheikh had a Bible and asked why, when she was a Muslim. Sheikh replied that she was in search of God. At this point, Dr. Pia Santiago suggested that Sheikh should pray to God and ask Him to reveal himself to her. She told Sheikh to talk to God as she would speak with her father. Sheikh had a very good and loving relationship with her father, so she prayed to God as if he was her father. She had never before thought of God as a "Father", but she found that this personal and intimate view of God began to transform her life. On 24 December 1966, in response to her prayer and search for God, Sheikh was converted to Christianity. Soon thereafter, she began attending a local gathering of Christians that met on a weekly basis. Christian baptism of a formerly Muslim individual was considered the defining moment in her culture, which signified a definitive break from Islam and identifies new Christians as traitors and infidels.

When news of her conversion came to light, she was confronted by her family. When she spoke with conviction and shared the news of her baptism, her family shunned her in response. She also began receiving threatening letters and telephone calls from unknown persons. She lost most of her Muslim family and friends. Those of her servants who were Christian, fled her home in response to rumors that she would be killed by religious elements in the area. She was considered a traitor and infidel, and many people were of the opinion that she ought to be killed for apostasy. At one point, her home was torched, but her remaining servants were able to put out the flames before the whole house caught fire.

Sheikh fled to the US for her safety, and that of her grandson. She began speaking about her conversion at churches and praying to God.

In 1968, Sheikh spoke at a Billy Graham Crusade in Singapore, where thousands were in attendance. In 1972, when an Army General of Pakistan began confronting her about her beliefs, she escaped to the United States, through the sponsorship of Robert Pierce and the Samaritan's Purse non governmental organization. She was also supported by Billy Graham and his son, Franklin, who became president of the organization in 1979, following Pierce's death in 1978. Sheikh remained in the US for almost 15 years, where she spoke in various venues, church services, public conferences, and Billy Graham Crusades with thousands of people in attendance. In 1978, she wrote a book of her experiences, which included a recounting of her prophetic dreams and encounters with evil spirits, as well as her narrow escapes from death.

== Retirement and death ==
Sheikh lived in the United States with her grandson and adopted son, 'Mahmud', until 1987. Following a severe heart attack and declining health, they both returned to Pakistan to live closer to her family. She died on 9 April 1997 at the age of 77 after a stroke paralyzed the left side of her body. She is buried in a Christian graveyard in Murree, a hill station in the foothills of the Himalayas.

== Published works ==
Sheikh's autobiography, I Dared To Call Him Father, was published in 1978, by Chosen Books a division of Baker Publishing Group, and distributed by Word Publishing, now owned by HarperCollins. The book was co-authored by Richard H. Schneider and provided a foreword by Catherine Marshall. It has been printed numerous times, along with a study guide, in various formats. The book has also been translated into several different languages, including English, Arabic, Chinese, Urdu, Persian, Finnish, German,Thai, Amharic, Tigrinya, and Italian. The autobiography is a best-selling book, with over 300,000 copies sold.

In 2003, a 25th Anniversary deluxe version of the book was released, repackaged as I Dared to Call Him Father: The Miraculous Story of a Muslim Woman's Encounter with God. The book is a classic in Christian literature and Muslim evangelism. As of 2012, the book is available in hardcover, paperback, audio, CD, and digital e-book format.

== Bibliography ==
- Sheikh, Bilquis; Schneider, Richard H.; and Marshall, Catherine (foreword). I Dared To Call Him Father, Baker Publishing Group/Chosen Books, 1978. ISBN 978-0-912376-22-6
- Sheikh, Bilquis; Schneider, Richard H.; and Marshall, Catherine (foreword). I Dared to Call Him Father: The Miraculous Story of a Muslim Woman's Encounter with God (Deluxe Edition), Baker Publishing Group/Chosen Books, 2003. ISBN 978-0-8007-9324-1
