= Arfa Sayeda Zehra =

Pakistani educationist (1937–2025)

- عارفہ سیدہ زہرا
- Born: 22 June 1937; Lahore, Punjab Province, British India
- Died: 10 November 2025 (aged 88); Karachi, Sindh, Pakistan
- Occupations: Writer, human rights activist

Academic background
- Education: University of Hawaii at Manoa; Lahore College for Women University; Government College University, Lahore

Academic work
- Discipline: Urdu language
- Institutions: Forman Christian College; Lahore College for Women University

Arfa Sayeda Zehra (Punjabi: عارفہ سیدہ زہرا, Urdu: عارفہ سیدہ زہرا; 22 June 1937 – 10 November 2025) was a Pakistani human rights activist. She served as the Special Adviser to the Prime Minister for Education and National Harmony Affairs. She studied first at Lahore College for Women University, then Government College University, with further degrees from the University of Hawaii at Manoa. Zehra was a professor emeritus of history at Forman Christian College and was a principal of the Lahore College for Women University. She was a chairperson on the National Commission on the Status of Women and a caretaker provincial minister of Punjab. She was recognised for her knowledge of the Urdu language and literature and specialised in intellectual history and South Asian social issues; outside of the university sphere, she spoke at language conferences and televised forums.

== Education ==
Arfa Sayeda Zehra completed a Bachelor of Arts with honours from Lahore College for Women University. She earned a Master of Arts in Urdu from Government College University in Lahore. She completed a Master of Arts in Asian studies and a Doctor of Philosophy in History from University of Hawaii at Manoa. Her 1983 dissertation was titled Sir Sayyid Ahmad Khan, 1817-1898: Man with a Mission.

== Scholarly career ==
From 1966 through 1972, Zehra was a lecturer at Lahore College for Women. She became an assistant professor in 1972 and taught until 1984. She served the Vice Principal of Lahore College for Women University from 1985 to 1988 before becoming the principal from 1988 to 1989. From 1989 to 2002, she was the Principal of the Government College of Women, Gulberg. From 2002 to 2005, she was a member of the Punjab Public Service Commission. Zehra was a chairperson on the National Commission on the Status of Women. Zehra was a caretaker provincial minister of Punjab. She joined the faculty at Forman Christian College as a professor of history in August 2009. She was a visiting faculty member at the following institutions: Lahore University of Management Sciences, the National College of Arts, the National School of Public Policy, and the National Institute of Management. Her research was in the areas of intellectual history, historical analysis and critique, human rights, and gender literature and social issues. She was a professor emeritus at Forman Christian College in Lahore.

== Urdu language ==
Zehra was recognised for her knowledge of the Urdu language and literature. She advocated for continued use of the language, for access to books, and for a "literary revolution" of Pakistani youth for their national language. On the language itself, she discussed the influences of classism and colonialism on the language's speakers and perceptions of the language itself. Her literary influences include Ghalib and Syed Ahmad Khan. She was lauded as a historian and moderated forums on the language.

== Personal life and death ==
Zehra was an advocate for development, basic human rights, and gender equality. She stated that she has never been an official member of any non-governmental organization, instead choosing to work through education. She was chairperson of the National Commission on the Status of Women and moderated on women's basic legal rights. Her work for female equity and parity was a factor leading to her choice to teach at a women's college. She died on 10 November 2025, at the age of 88.

== Awards and honours ==
Zehra was a University of Hawaii 2016 Distinguished Alumni Awardee.

== See also ==
- Ashfaq Ahmed
- Bano Qudsia
- Javed Ahmad Ghamidi
- Zehra Nigah
