= Aurat Foundation =

Pakistani organization for women's rights

- Formation: 1986; 40 years ago
- Founders: Nigar Ahmed; Shahla Zia
- Type: Advocacy
- Location: Islamabad, Pakistan
- President: Anis Haroon
- Website: www.af.org.pk

Aurat Foundation, founded in 1986, is a women's rights organization based in Islamabad, Pakistan. Its co-founders were Nigar Ahmed and Shahla Zia. As of 2026, the foundation's president is Anis Haroon.

== History ==
On 13 February 2026, Benazir Bhutto's daughter Aseefa Bhutto Zardari praised the Aurat Foundation for its 40 years of support of women's rights saying that Pakistan's history would not be complete without women. She expresse that every conversation about women's empowerment brought to mind her mother, former Prime Minister Benazir Bhutto, who supported women's active involvement in all spheres of life rather than just their symbolic inclusion. She pointed out that despite advancements, women in Pakistan still face significant obstacles, and that real freedom won't be attained until every female is given all of her rights. At the end of celebrations, Zardari was also aware a Global Peace Award. In the same even, Chief Minister of Sindh Murad Ali Shah announced a grant of Rs 50 million for foundation.

== See also ==
- Women in Pakistan
