= Afiya S. Zia =

Pakistani feminist researcher, writer and activist

- عافیہ شہربانو ضیا
- Born: Afiya Shehrbano Zia
- Education: University of Toronto, University of York
- Occupations: Feminist researcher, writer
- Known for: Author of "Faith and Feminism in Pakistan" (SAP-2018)

Afiya Shehrbano Zia (Urdu: عافیہ شہربانو ضیا) is a Pakistani feminist researcher, writer and activist based in Karachi. She is the author of "Faith and Feminism in Pakistan"(Sussex Academic Press, 2018) and several published articles on women, secularism and religion. She is an active member of Women's Action Forum.

== Biography ==
Zia completed her master's degree in 1992, in Women's Studies from the University of York, England. Zia has a PhD degree in Women and Gender Studies from the University of Toronto.

Zia is an independent researcher. From 1993 to 1997 she worked for projects on women and development in non-governmental, wrote papers and edited many books on women's issues. In Karachi, she teaches sociology in college and writes regularly for newspapers. She is the founding member of an academic group in Karachi and appears on different TV channels as commentator on socio-political topics.

She has taught at University of Toronto and in Habib University for a semester, where she designed a course on Women, Work and Islam.

== Publications ==
She is the author of many books and essays including "Sex Crime in the Islamic Context" (1994, ASR), "Voicing Demands" (Zed Books, 2014) and "Contesting Feminisms: Gender and Islam in Asia” (SUNY Press, 2015). Her essays have been published in the International Feminist Journal of Politics and Feminist Review. Her book, Faith and Feminism in Pakistan, talks about achievements, history and threats faced by the secular feminist movements in Pakistan in recent years. Zia attempts to recognise the potential of these movements in the country.

Zia has written columns in Dawn News, Nayadaur, The News International, openDemocracy, The Friday Times, TNS- The News On Sunday, Economic and Political Weekly, The Express Tribune, Daily Times (Pakistan) and The Guardian.
