= Nigar Ahmed =

Pakistani women's rights activist

- نگار احمد
- Born: February 16, 1945; Pakistan
- Died: February 24, 2017 (aged 72)
- Occupations: Academic, Women's rights Activist
- Known for: Founding member of Women's Action Forum and Aurat Foundation

Nigar Ahmed (16 February 1945 – 24 February 2017) was a Pakistani women’s rights activist who founded the Women’s Action Forum and Aurat Foundation. She died aged 72.

== Early life and education ==
Ahmed was born in Lahore in 1945, to Riazuddin Ahmad and Akhtar. She got her early education from the Convent of Jesus and Mary. She did her Masters in Economics from Government College Lahore. She was a member of the Government College Dramatics Club and later editor of the famous magazine Ravi. Later she went to New Hall, Cambridge, on a Commonwealth scholarship. After coming back, she taught Economics in Quaid-i-Azam University.

== Feminism ==
Soon after formation of Women's Action Forum in 1981 in Karachi, Ahmed started the Islamabad and Lahore chapters in 1982. While living in Islamabad for nearly sixteen years, she stayed involved in the women’s movement. She co-founded Aurat Foundation in 1986 with the late Shehla Zia under the dictatorship era of Zia ul Haq.

== Personal life ==
Ahmed married Tariq Siddiqi, a civil servant, in Swat. They had two sons together, Bilal and Ahmad. Her husband and both sons got Ph.D. degrees.

== Death ==
Ahmed was diagnosed with Parkinson’s disease in 2001. In 2017, she was suffering with chest infection and admitted to a hospital in Lahore, where she died.

== Awards ==
In 2005, her name was nominated for Nobel Peace Prize among other Pakistani women.

In 2010, she received Mohtarma Fatima Jinnah Life Time Achievement Award.
