= Shahla Zia =

Pakistani lawyer and activist

Shahla Zia شہلا ضیاء
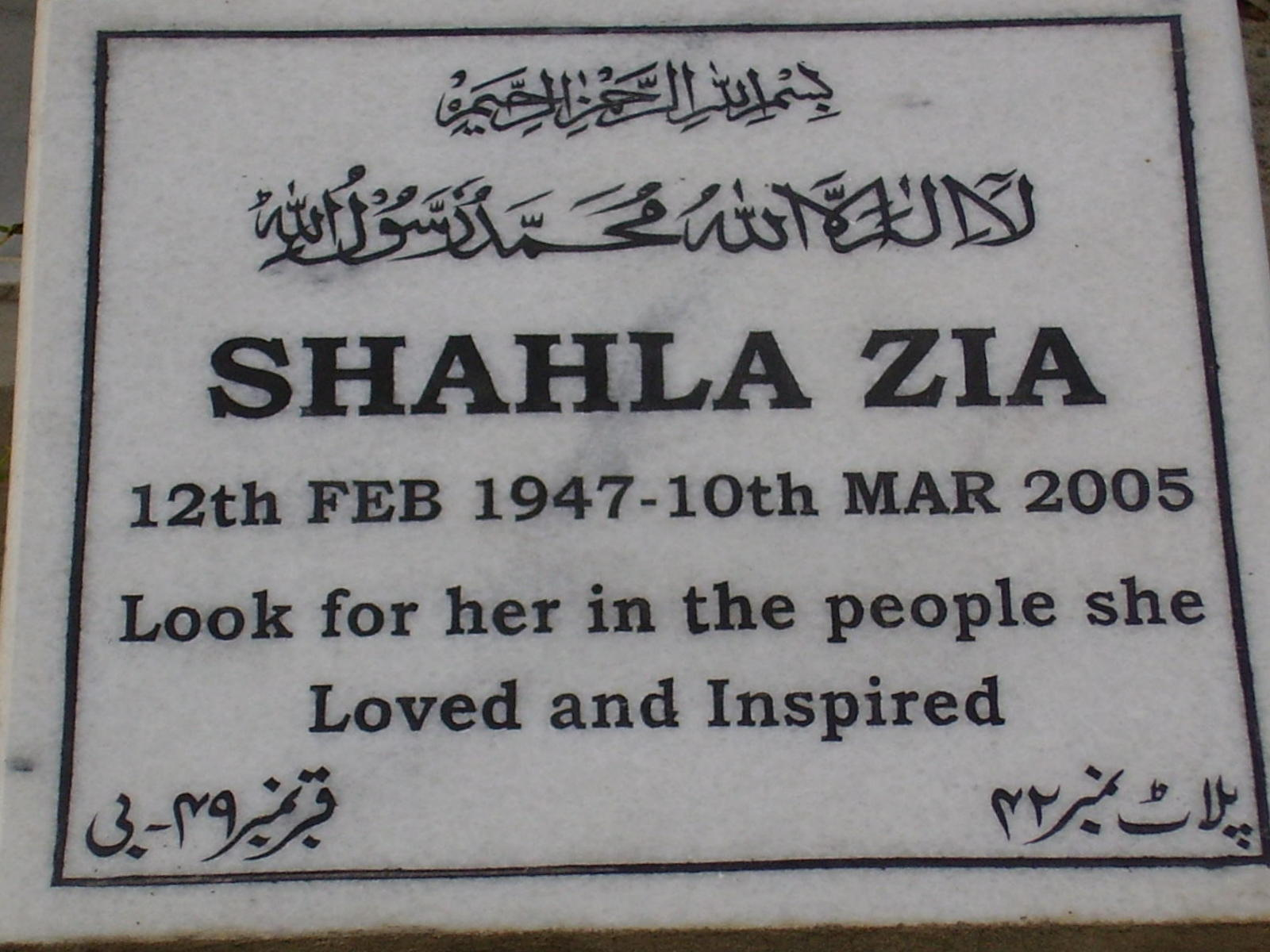
- Born: 12 February 1947; Lahore, Punjab, British India
- Died: 10 March 2005 (aged 58); Islamabad, Pakistan
- Burial place: Islamabad
- Citizenship: Pakistan
- Education: Punjab University Law College
- Occupation: Lawyer

Shahla Zia (12 February 1947 – 10 March 2005) also known as Shehla Zia, was a Pakistani lawyer and activist, known for her advocacy of women's rights.

== Personal life ==
Zia was born into a Punjabi Muslim family in Lahore. Her father Mahmood Ali Khan was an activist for the Pakistan movement, whilst her mother Satnam Mahmood was an educationist. She attended the University of the Punjab in the 1960s, from where she received her bachelor's degree in law, becoming one of the first Pakistani women to do so.

She had two sons and three daughters. One of her daughters is Maliha Zia Lari who is also a lawyer and human rights activist. Zia died at the age of 58, after an illness.

== Legal work and activism ==
Zia was one of the founders of the women's rights organization Aurat Foundation, along with Nigar Ahmed, as well as the AGHS women's law firm and legal aid centre in 1980, along with Asma Jahangir. In 1983, Zia was imprisoned along with several other women for protesting the 1983 Law of Evidence in front of the Lahore High Court, which had the effect of rendering the testimony of a male witness equal to that of two women under some circumstances. She was also active in the Women's Action Forum. Zia built a reputation for fighting laws that were discriminatory against women and religious minorities.

Zia served on a commission examining the status of women in Pakistan, appointed by the government, and was a coauthor of its report in 1997. When the Pakistani National Assembly approved Sharia law in 1998 through the Fifteenth constitutional amendment, Zia was forced to resign her positions on several government bodies.

Zia was the named plaintiff in a 1994 case in the Pakistani Supreme Court, in which the plaintiffs brought a legal challenge against the construction of an electric grid station, citing health risks. The ruling is considered a landmark in environmental law in Pakistan, because it held that the right to a healthy environment was constitutionally protected, and fell within the right to life and dignity.
