= Ghazala Rahman Rafiq =

Pakistani educationist and social reformer

- غزالہ رحمان رفیق
- Born: Pakistan
- Education: University of California, Santa Barbara, USA
- Occupations: Assistant professor in Shaheed Zulfikar Ali Bhutto Institute of Science and Technology (SZABIST), Women's rights Activist
- Known for: Founding member of The Sindh Abhyas Academy (SAA) and Women's Action Forum

Ghazala Rahman Rafiq (Urdu: غزالہ رحمان رفیق) is an educationist, and social reformer from Karachi, Sindh, Pakistan. She is daughter of the eminent Hassanally A. Rahman. She was one of the founder members of Women's Action Forum in 1981.

== Education and career ==
Rafiq did her Ph.D. in education from University of California, Santa Barbara, USA. After completing her PhD, Rafiq as an academic was interested to preserve Sindhi language. She is director of The Sindh Abhyas Academy (SAA) which is housed at Shaheed Zulfikar Ali Bhutto Institute of Science and Technology (SZABIST), Karachi. The institute offers education for the subject of Sindh Studies including Sindh’s history, geography, culture, economics, anthropology and philosophy for undergraduate and graduate degrees.

== Publications ==
In addition to that she is a freelance writer and has written numerous articles on Education Policy in Sindh and Pakistan. She has also written in Dawn News, The Friday Times and The Express Tribune.
