= Pakistan Women Lawyers' Association =

Activist organization in Pakistan

- Abbreviation: PAWLA
- Founded: 1880
- Type: Social organization
- Location: Karachi, Pakistan

The Women Lawyers' Association (WLA) or Pakistan Women Lawyers' Association (PWLA) works for gender equality in Pakistan's judicial system and is committed to removing gender bias while promoting gender-equality in the legal profession.

The Pakistan Women Lawyers' Association is supports small-scale projects throughout the country that focus on empowering women. Its activities include instituting legal aid for indigent women and opposing gender-segregation in universities, etc. It publicizes and condemns the growing incidents of violence against women, and has released a series of films educating women about their legal rights. The focus of the movement is three-pronged, i.e. ensuring women's representation in the National Assembly, raising women's consciousness about family planning, and fighting suppression of women's rights by defining positions on events in order to raise public awareness.

Legislative landmarks by Pakistan Women Lawyers' Association on women's rights are paving the way towards the full economic, social, legal and political participation of women. Some of these landmarks include Sindh's Home-Based Workers Policy, Punjab's Protection of Women against Violence Bill, and Balochistan's Protection against Harassment of Women at the Workplace Act.

== See also ==
- Violence against women in Pakistan law
- Women in Pakistani politics
- Women's Protection Bill
- Family Lawyers Pakistan
