= National Women's Day (Pakistan) =

National Women's Day in Pakistan

National Women's Day in Pakistan is 12 February of each year, chosen to mark the first women's march in Pakistan against the Zia ul Haq's military regime. The date 12 February 1983 is significant in the history of women's rights in Pakistan because the first such march was brutally suppressed by the martial law enforced by the police of General Zia ul Haq's regime. The Day is over three weeks before International Women's Day when the Aurat Marches take place in Pakistan.

== Annual commemorations ==
Pakistan's National Women's Day is held annually on 12 February to mark the first women's march in the country held on that date in 1983. 22 December is also celebrated as a National Day for Pakistani Working Women. These two days, in addition to International Women's Day, were acknowledged for celebration by Pakistan's government from the time of Yousaf Raza Gillani the former Prime Minister.

=== 2012 ===
Among those honoured in 2012 were Shahnaz Wazir Ali (PPP's adviser to the PM), Nilofar Bakhtiar (PML-Q Senator), Bushra Gohar (ANP MNA), and Kishwer Zehra (MQM MNA), for proactively working on women's rights related bills. 2013 National Women's Day was commemorated at Fatima Jinnah Park with awareness stalls about gender-based violence, where activist presented skits and speeches. The 2013 event was observed by women from Khyber Pakhtunkhwa and FATA who distributed awards to women journalists, politicians, and activists in the women's rights movement in Pakistan.

=== 2015 ===
An event at the Nomad Gallery in Islamabad included poetry by Harris Khalique and Aliya Mirza.

A song 'Kaun Kehta Hai Beikhtiyar Hoon Main' by Aaliya Mirza and sung by Zainab Fatima was released on National Women's Day. It was dedicated to the women who participated in the 1983 Women's March in Lahore.

=== 2017 ===
National Commission on the Status of Women (NCSW) held a 2017 National Women's Day event at Fatimah Jinnah Women University (FJWU) at Rawalpindi. A dialogue on the topic of 'Taking the women's agenda forward between women activists and parliamentarians' was addressed by Vice Chancellor Samina Amin Qadir and Tehmina Daultana, a member of the National Assembly.

=== 2019 ===
According to Dawn, on 2019 National Women's Day (Pakistan) two events were organized at Islamabad. One event was held at National Press Club (NPC), which was addressed by Khawar Mumtaz, the Chairperson of National Commission on Status of Women and also by Poet Kishwar Naheed. At NPC event participants acknowledged some progress on legal front but expressed concerns over continued cases of gendered violence like honor killings, child marriages, child abuse and weakening of democratic processes in preceding two years. In other event held at National Institute of Folk and Traditional Heritage (Lok Virsa) was addressed by Federal Ombudsperson Kashmala Tariq. Complaint registration processes at Federal Ombudsman Secretariat for Protection against Harassment of Women at the Workplace (FOSPAH) and Protection against Harassment of Women at the Workplace Act 2010 were explained.

=== 2020 ===
The theme for the 2020 event in Karachi was "Women's social protection in the context of gender-based violence". Panelists talked about various socio-legal issues like gender-based violence, the role of the Sindh Commission on the Status of Women, the Women Development Department of Government of Sindh and NGOs in improving the status of women in the society. According to Xari Jalil, Women Action Forum Lahore members commemorated 2020 National Women's day event at Applied Socio-economic Research (ASR) Resource Centre with a session of speeches and poetry. At Lahore, National Women's Day was also commemorated at Lahore College for Women University; Vice Chancellor Bushra Mirza, retired justice Nasira Javed Iqbal, and Women Development Minister Ashifa Riaz Fatyana addressed the event.

According to Farman Ali, an exhibition of painting titled 'Laazim Hai Ke Hum Bhi Dekhengey' was held at Nomad Gallery Islamabad to commemorating the National Women's Day where in most of presented paintings highlighted the violence and pain endured by women in Pakistan's patriarchal culture.

=== 2022 ===
2022 National Women's Day, a Karachi event themed 'Zero Tolerance for Violence' was organised by the Sindh Commission on the Status of Women was held at Frere Hall. The 2022 Lahore event happened at the Aurat Foundation (AF) office itself.

== 1983 Women's March, Lahore ==
On 12 February 1983, a women's march of about 100 people led by the Women's Action Forum (WAF) and the Punjab Women Lawyers Association assembled at Mall road in Lahore and proceeded toward Pakistan's Lahore High Court to protest against the discriminatory Law of Evidence and other Hudood Ordinances. The proposed evidentiary law was intended to reduce the value of women's court testimony to half of that of men; the Hudood ordinances, reduced women's rights by the dictatorship's use of Sharia laws. The marchers were tear gassed and baton charged by police injuring many women. Fifty of the marchers were arrested for defying the existent ban on public assembly.

== Bibliography ==
- Khan, Ayesha. The Women's Movement in Pakistan: Activism, Islam and Democracy. United Kingdom, Bloomsbury Publishing, 2018.
- Weiss, Anita M.. Interpreting Islam, Modernity, and Women's Rights in Pakistan. United Kingdom, Palgrave Macmillan, 2014. Page 49.
- Omvedt, Gail (2005). "Women in Governance in South Asia". Economic and Political Weekly. 40 (44/45). Sameeksha Trust: 4746–52. JSTOR 4417361.
- Imran, R. (2005) 'Legal injustices: The Zina Hudood Ordinance of Pakistan and its implications for women', Journal of International Women's Studies, 7(2), pp. 78–100
- Jalal, A. (1991). The Convenience of Subservience: Women and the State of Pakistan. In: Kandiyoti, D. (eds) Women, Islam and the State. Palgrave Macmillan, London. https://doi.org/10.1007/978-1-349-21178-4_4
- Korson, J. Henry; Maskiell, Michelle (1985). "Islamization and Social Policy in Pakistan: The Constitutional Crisis and the Status of Women". Asian Survey. 25 (6). University of California Press: 589–612. doi:10.2307/2644377. JSTOR 2644377.
- Women's Movements in Asia: Feminisms and Transnational Activism. United Kingdom, Taylor & Francis, 2010. Page 167
- Re-Interrogating Civil Society in South Asia: Critical Perspectives from India, Pakistan and Bangladesh. India, Taylor & Francis, 2021. Page 191 / 192
