= Lala Rukh =

Pakistani teacher, women's rights activist and artist

- Born: 29 June 1948; Lahore, Pakistan
- Died: 7 July 2017 (aged 69); Lahore, Pakistan
- Occupations: Artist, educator, and women's rights activist

Lala Rukh (1948–2017) was a prominent artist, educator, and women's rights activist based in Lahore, Pakistan. She is considered as one of pioneering artists of minimalism in South Asia. Lala Rukh taught at Punjab University's Department of Fine Art and the National College of Arts for nearly four decades. She was one of the co-founders of Women's Action Forum, a women's rights organization established in 1981 in Pakistan, and Simorgh Women's Resource and Publication Centre founded in Lahore in 1985, and Vasl Artists Trust in 2000. Her largest survey to date was organized by the Sharjah Art Foundation in 2024.

== Education ==
Lala Rukh earned a master's degree in Fine Arts at University of the Punjab, Lahore (MFA) and University of Chicago, Illinois (MFA). She taught for thirty years at Punjab University, Department of Fine Art and the National College of Arts, Lahore. In 2000, she set up the MA (Hons) Visual Art Program at the National College of Arts, which she led until her retirement in 2008. Over the years, she received several government travel grants in Pakistan, allowing her to study in Turkey and Afghanistan.

== Artistic practice ==
Lala Rukh's artwork is characterized by minimalist and meditative expressions. They key recurring themes in her works include water bodies and the horizon line. Her piece "Mirror Image, 1, 2, 3" (1997) was acquired by the Metropolitan Museum of Art in New York in 2020. Editions of her work "Rupak" (2016) are included in the collections of Tate Modern in London, Samdani Art Foundation in Dhaka, Art Jameel in Dubai, and the Metropolitan Museum of Art in New York.

Her works have been exhibited at notable institutions such as the Jameel Arts Centre in Dubai (2024), Diriyah Contemporary Art Biennale in Riyadh (2024), Dhaka Art Summit (2023 and 2018), Ishara Art Foundation in Dubai (2022), Kiran Nadar Museum of Art in New Delhi (2020), Punta della Dogana in Venice (2019), Centre Pompidou in Paris (2018), Lahore Biennial (2018), documenta 14 (2017) in Kassel, Drawing Room in London (2017–18), Athens Conservatoire (2017), Kunsthaus Centre D'Art Pasquart in Biel (2017), Yinchuan Biennale (2016), and Sharjah Biennial 12 (2015).

== Feminist activism ==
Lala Rukh was one of the fifteen founding members of the Women's Action Forum (WAF) in 1981 . As an activist and campaigner, she advocated for the rights of women and various minority groups. She participated in protests against the martial law imposed by Dictator Ziaul Haq. For her political activities, she was also sent to jail at that time. Lala Rukh opposed the Hudood Ordinance penal code, considering it as discriminatory against women. During Musharaf's dictatorship, she was arrested again during the Emergency of 2007, alongside fifty other WAF members.

As an active member of WAF, Lala Rukh used her art to address community and women's rights issues. In Lahore, when local printers refused to print newsletters and protest materials on government orders, she took the initiative to organize workshops where participants designed and printed WAF's posters advocating for women's freedom and equal rights. Her collection of feminist art, "Crimes Against Women," originated from this series of posters. Lala Rukh was also involved in the Pakistan-India Peoples' Forum for Peace and Democracy (PIPFPD).

== Personal life and estate ==
Lala Rukh adopted her sister's daughter, Maryam Rahman, who is currently leading The Estate of Lala Rukh. Lala Rukh was diagnosed with cancer in June 2017 and died on 7 July 2017, at the age of 69. Grey Noise Gallery in Dubai represents the Estate of Lala Rukh.
