= Majida Rizvi =

Justice (R) Majida Rizvi

Judge of the Sindh High Court

Justice (R) Majida Rizvi (Urdu: ماجدہ رضوی) is a retired jurist from Pakistan who became the first woman judge of a High Court in the country. She practiced in the High Courts and Supreme Court and taught law at Hamdard School of Law. As a writer she specialized in legal issues pertaining to the rights of women and children, and is associated with various organizations for the removal of all discrimination against women and supporting human rights.

After retiring as a Judge of the Sindh High Court, she worked as the chairperson, Sindh Human Rights Commission.

Justice Majida Razvi Profile on SHRC Website https://www.shrc.org.pk/team-1.php
