= Wajahat Masood =

Pakistani journalist (born 1966)

- Wajahat Masood (second from left)
- Born: 3 August 1966 (age 59); Gujranwala, Pakistan
- Education: M.A. English, University of Punjab (Pakistan); LLM, University of Leeds (UK)
- Occupations: Journalist; Human rights activist Analyst and columnist
- Awards: Pride of Performance

Wajahat Masood (Urdu: وجاہت مسعود; born 3 August 1966) is a Pakistani journalist, columnist, political analyst, academic and human rights defender. He is widely considered to be a liberal, and promotes the ideals of human rights and democracy, including equality of rights and citizenship.

He is currently working with the Urdu-language newspaper Daily Jang. He has earlier worked with BBC and other organisations. He is currently the chief editor of e-paper Humsub Urdu and Humsub English. He is a host of a current affairs program "Sadd Rang", being aired on PTV News.

== Early life and career ==
Wajahat Masood was born on 3 August 1966. He did his graduation from Government College University, Lahore and M.A. English from University of the Punjab, Lahore, Pakistan. Then he went on to earn an LLM degree in International Human Rights Law from the University of Leeds, UK.

He has been active in three fields: education, human rights and journalism. In 1994, he founded and then worked as a director for the Democratic Commission for Human Development for 11 years besides acting as a consultant for different international development agencies. Wajahat Masood trained thousands of young activists in the villages of Pakistan in human rights and human development. Wajahat Masood has been acting as chairperson, Centre for Social Justice since 2014.

He was associated with national dailies such as The News International, The Post (Pakistani newspaper) and Daily Aaj Kal. He also worked as the editor of monthly magazine Nawa-i-Insaan, Daily Mashriq and weekly Hum Shehri. He was a columnist for BBC Urdu service during 2005–08.

He has been a political analyst for Pakistani television (PTV), Samaa TV, AAP News and Radio Pakistan. In addition, he appears as a TV commentator for PNN four evenings a week apart from different private television channels in Pakistan and abroad.

He was teaching at Beaconhouse National University until July 2015, when he resigned from that position. He has taught at University of the Punjab, Government College University, Lahore, National College of Arts (Lahore) and Lahore School of Law. He was the founding editor of Dunyapakistan.com. He is a highly acclaimed Urdu language columnist. He writes three columns a week for the most widely circulated Urdu language newspaper in the country, Daily Jang besides a weekly column for Deutsche Welle.

Pakistan's veteran journalist and columnist I.A. Rehman has talked highly of Wajahat Masood's journalistic abilities in his recently published book. I.A. Rehman says that Wajahat Masood not only informs his readers but also helps them understand the larger picture in terms of the political situation in Pakistan.

== Publications ==
Wajahat Masood has authored several booklets and books on politics, history, culture and literature.

1. Jala Watan Ki Manajaat
2. Mahaasray Ka Roznaamcha (volumes 1-5)
3. Aman Mumkin Hai
4. Jamhooriat ke 100 Baras
5. Nisab-e-Gul
6. What is Democracy
7. What is Critical Thinking
8. What is Secularism
9. What is Fundamentalism
10. Walton camp nai mukia (Punjabi poetry)
11. Maulvi Tamiz ud din banaam wafaq e Pakistan (Translation)
12. suhrwardy ki siasat beeti (Translation)
13. Nobel inaam yaftagaan kay afsanay (Translation)

== Articles ==
1. The dynamics of Khan's victory
2. Icon of democracy
3. The people's party
4. Certainly no time to die
5. Soft-crust religious extremism
6. A captive freedom

== Awards and recognition ==
- Pride of Performance Award for journalism by the President of Pakistan in 2016
- National Bibliophile Award in 2013
