= Protection of Women against Violence Bill, 2015 =

2015 Law in Punjab, Pakistan

Protection of Women Against Violence Bill 2015 is a bill drafted by Chief Minister's Special Monitoring Unit (Law and Order) and passed by the Provincial Assembly of the Punjab which was signed into a law on 1 March 2016 by Malik Muhammad Rafique Rajwana. The law declares physical violence, abusive language, stalking, cyber crimes, sexual violence, psychological and emotional abuse against women a crime in Punjab, home to 60% of Pakistan's population. Additionally, it creates a toll-free universal access number (UAN) to receive complaints while district protection committees will be established to investigate complaints filed by women. Centres will also be set up for reconciliation and resolution of disputes. Every district would have women's shelters and district-level panels to investigate reports of abuse and mandates the use of GPS bracelets to keep track of offenders

The bill aims is to promote gender equality in the province, it allows women to get a residence order, the victim has a right to stay in the house if she doesn't want to vacate it or the defendant has to provide an alternative accommodation to the victim if she wants so. Further, if she is being harassed or stalked, she can claim a protection order which ordains the defendant to not communicate with her or stay a certain distance from her. In addition, the victim can also seek monetary relief from the defendant to meet expenses occurred and losses suffered through monetary orders in this bill. The law has been termed as divisive, in particular right-wing religious parties have rejected the women protection bill terming it 'un-Islamic'. A broad coalition of far-right political parties in Pakistan was created to oppose the bill, including Jamaat-e-Islami Pakistan, Jamiat Ulema-e-Pakistan Islami Tehreek and Ahl al-Hadith. Council of Islamic Ideology has also opposed the bill while Maulana Fazal-ur-Rehman has called the law as part to 'fulfill the foreign agenda'. The bill has been challenged at the Federal Shariat Court.

On 1 March 2016, the first case was registered under the law in Lahore by Bassra Bibi, 30, who filed a complaint against her husband for domestic abuse, within an hour the police arrested her husband. Proponents of the bill have staged rally's to oppose the backlash by conservatives, it has been termed as the first time that a legislation provides protection through an in-built implementation mechanism to ensure speedy justice-delivery to victims. This is through the establishment of SMULawOrder's conceived ′Violence Against Women Centers′ and the details of this centre are provided below

Violence Against Women Centres (VAWCs) In Punjab, daily, 6 women are murdered or attempted to murder, 8 raped, 11 battered and assaulted, and 32 women are abducted while the conviction rate is only 1-2.5% (DIG Investigations Branch 2013). Women victims of violence have to undergo a snake and ladder system of justice delivery in order to just lodge an FIR. Chief Minister's Special Monitoring Unit (Law & Order), under the direction of Chief Minister Punjab is establishing Violence Against Women Centres (VAWC) in Punjab's 36 districts, in order to provide a comprehensive justice delivery system to women victims of violence. The first VAWC is currently under construction in Multan district, which will be made operational by June 2016. The model will be replicated in the remaining 35 districts, through a phase-wise program, as specified under the Punjab Protection of Women against Violence Act. The establishment of Violence Against Women Centres will entirely change the current lethargic system by stream-lining the case-flow process and integrated the departments through a software. With these 24-hour all-1omen run VAWCs all disconnected departments will be brought under one roof - first aid, police reporting, FIR lodging, prosecution, medical examination, forensics and post trauma rehabilitation in order to strengthen the case of the prosecution. A toll-free helpline, community centre and shelter home are also part of these centres. In the Women Protection Act, These enters have been mandated in all 36 districts of Punjab.

The bill has been praised by academics including the Vice Chancellor of GCU Lahore, National Students Federation, Punjab Chief Minister Shehbaz Sharif, Human Rights Commission of Pakistan, activists including Asma Jahangir and Farzana Bari, political parties including the ruling Pakistan Muslim League (N) and opposition Pakistan Peoples Party. On 20 March 2016, demonstrations were held in Lahore and Faisalabad to support the bill. A joint action committee (JAC) comprising political and human rights activists and civil society members was formed to support the law. The only religious organisation to support the bill is the All Pakistan Ulema Council. The bill has generally been hailed as comprehensive in liberal circles in Pakistan. Newspaper editorials including by The Express Tribune, Dawn, Daily Times and The Friday Times has supported the bill.
