= Khalid Amir Khan =

Pakistani diplomat and politician (born 1934)

Khalid Amir Khan (born 2 December 1934) was a Pakistani landowner, diplomat and politician. He served as ambassador to Hungary, Tajikistan, and Uzbekistan in the 1990s, and played a major role in the politics of the Punjab and especially the Sargodha district.

Khan was primarily a landowner, who managed his vast Khankhel Estate, located in Zabardust Khanwala, on the fringes of the village of Trekhanwala.

== Early life and education ==
He was born on 2 December 1934 to Bilquis Sultana and Major Amir Abdullah Khan, a land holder from a Pathan Afghan Khankhel family from Sargodha District, Punjab, Pakistan. Khalid Amir was of distinguished rural lineage. His father was Amir Abdullah Khan, belonging to the Khankhel tribe. Khalid's mother was Bilquis Sultana, from the illustrious Khattar family of Wah in Rawalpindi District. She was a descendant of one Muhammad Hyat Khan Khattar, later Nawab, who founded the fortunes of the Hyat family with his unflinching loyalty to Brigadier-General John Nicholson (called ‘Nickel Hussain’ in the Hyat family history), and for his gallantry in the battle for the Lahore Gate at the time of the re-taking of Delhi for the British in 1857.

Khalid Amir Khan, was a student at Aitchison College between 1942 and 1951. Khalid Amir attended the University of California, Berkeley in 1952. There he graduated in political science along with his young wife Rabia. From Berkeley, he went on to University of California, Davis for a degree in agriculture.

== Career ==
Respected in Sargodha District for his political acumen, he was elected to the Punjab Assembly as an MPA in 1977. He was a political appointee as Ambassador to Hungary in 1991. His diplomatic skills in Budapest were very quickly recognised at the Foreign Office in Islamabad, which led to his appointment to two further ambassadorial appointments to Tajikistan and Uzbekistan.
