= Mazhar Ali Khan (journalist) =

Pakistani journalist (1917–1993)

- Born: 1917
- Died: 1993 (aged 75–76)
- Occupations: Journalist; editor
- Employer: The Pakistan Times
- Spouse: Tahira Mazhar Ali
- Children: Tariq Ali
- Military career
- Allegiance: British Empire
- Branch: British Indian Army
- Service years: 1942–1945
- Rank: Captain
- Conflicts: World War II; North African campaign; Italian campaign

Mazhar Ali Khan (1917 – 1993) was a Pakistani socialist intellectual and veteran journalist. He was the editor of The Pakistan Times in the 1950s, when it was considered a 'progressive' newspaper.

== Early life ==
According to Dawn newspaper, "Mazhar Ali Khan (1917–1993) was well known in his college days as a star debater, a lover of sports (tennis and swimming) and as a leader of a nationalist-minded and non-communal students' union." He served briefly as a Captain in the British Indian Army. Sir Sikandar Hayat Khan, then unionist Chief Minister of Punjab in British India, had made that a condition for Mazhar Ali Khan to serve as an officer in British Indian Army before he could marry his daughter, Tahira. So he fulfilled that condition to be able to marry Tahira. Despite his feudal background, young Mazhar Ali Khan started mobilizing peasants that were working on his extended family's lands due to the prevailing influence and trend towards socialist thinking in the late 1940s.

== Career ==
He was first asked to join the editorial team of The Pakistan Times in Lahore by newspaper's owner Mian Iftikharuddin after the 1947 independence of Pakistan. In 1951, when the then newspaper editor Faiz Ahmed Faiz was arrested over his suspected involvement in the Rawalpindi conspiracy case, Mazhar Ali Khan replaced him.

Mian Iftikharuddin had earlier launched The Pakistan Times to rally and win Punjab's support for the Pakistan Movement and its cause. He remained its editor until 19 April 1959, when Ayub Khan's military regime seized the newspaper and its sister publications, the Urdu-language newspaper Daily Imroze and the magazine Lail-o-Nahar. Iftikharuddin, Faiz Ahmed Faiz and later Mazhar Ali Khan developed the 'progressive' editorial viewpoint of their publications from 1947 to 1959. Neither Faiz nor Mazhar joined a major political party in Pakistan so as not to compromise their editorial independence. They both tried to give special emphasis to the rights of peasants and workers.

Mazhar Ali Khan's professional career may be divided into three parts – for the first 12 years, he wrote for The Pakistan Times which flourished under his editorial control and won the respect of the people. Mazhar Ali Khan never joined a political party to be able to preserve his editorial independence. The owner of the newspaper, Mian Iftikharuddin, also deserves some credit here because he chose not to interfere in the editor's domain. Mazhar Ali Khan's emphasis was on truthfulness and objectivity Then he had a relatively inactive period of 16 years, where he wrote an occasional column for different publications in Pakistan. In the final period of his life, he brought out and wrote for his weekly magazine Viewpoint from 1975 to 1993, the year of his death. In 1981, while he was jailed at Kot Lakhpat Jail, he continued writing his editorial for Viewpoint.

== Personal life ==
Mazhar Ali Khan married his cousin Tahira. According to The Friday Times newspaper, "She (Tahira) eloped with her charismatic, student leader cousin Mazhar when she was 17. Their marriage went on to become a fabled partnership." Tahira was the daughter of Punjabi feudal landlord and Unionist Party (Punjab) politician Sikander Hayat Khan who had also served as provincial prime minister of Punjab in British India from 1937 to 1942. After their marriage, Tahira stayed active socially and politically and was publicly known as Tahira Mazhar Ali. In the 1960s and 1970s, their son Tariq Ali (born in 1943) also became well-known as a British-Pakistani writer and a political activist with a socialist and communist viewpoint.

== See also ==
- Bilquis Sheikh
