= Tahira Mazhar Ali =

Pakistani political activist (1924–2005)

- Born: Tahira Hayat; 5 January 1924; Lahore, British India
- Died: 23 March 2005 (aged 81); Lahore, Pakistan
- Occupations: Left-wing political worker and activist, women's rights campaigner
- Known for: Member, Communist Party of Pakistan; Founder, Democratic Women's Association
- Spouse: Mazhar Ali Khan
- Children: Tariq Ali
- Father: Sikandar Hayat Khan

Tahira Mazhar Ali (née Hayat; 5 January 1924 – 23 March 2005) was a Pakistani women's rights campaigner, political activist, and a mentor to Benazir Bhutto. Her children include British Pakistani political activist Tariq Ali, Tauseef Hyat, and Australian journalist Mahir Ali.

== Early life ==
She was born on 5 January 1924 in Lahore, British India to Sikandar Hayat Khan (1892 – 1942), a politician and former Chief Minister of Punjab, during the British Raj. She was the younger sister of Sardar Shaukat Hayat Khan (1915 – 1998) and Begum Mahmooda Salim Khan (1913 – 2007).

Ali finished her basic education at Queen Mary School in Lahore. She married at the age of 17 to her cousin, Mazhar Ali Khan (1917 – 1993) who was a journalist and editor of The Pakistan Times newspaper who had socialist leanings.

== Career ==
She was one of the founding members of the Communist Party of Pakistan (CPP) and with her husband was also part of the Progressive Papers Ltd. (PPL).

Ali was jailed for vigorously opposing General Muhammad Zia-ul-Haq's dictatorship. She was the first person in Pakistan to pair the fight for workers' rights with the fight for women's rights, resisting Zia's assault on the rights of women. Although she was born in an affluent family, she remained an activist for labour and women's rights for over 60 years. In 1950, she was one of the founders of the Democratic Women's Association (DWA), considered the country's first independent women's rights organisation. For the first time in Pakistan, International Women's Day was observed under her leadership where it was openly demanded that women be given equal status and rights. In 1971, she was amongst a small group of people who protested against the war in East Pakistan (now Bangladesh).

In her later years, before she suffered a series of debilitating strokes that left her partially paralysed, she served as a mentor to many prominent Pakistani women.

== Death and legacy ==
Ali died on 23 March 2005 in Lahore. Veteran Pakistani journalist and human rights activist I. A. Rehman paid tribute to her in the Dawn newspaper, saying that she was "a true activist" and mentioned her work for women's rights and peace-making efforts between India and Pakistan.
