= Farida Shaheed =

Pakistani sociologist and activist

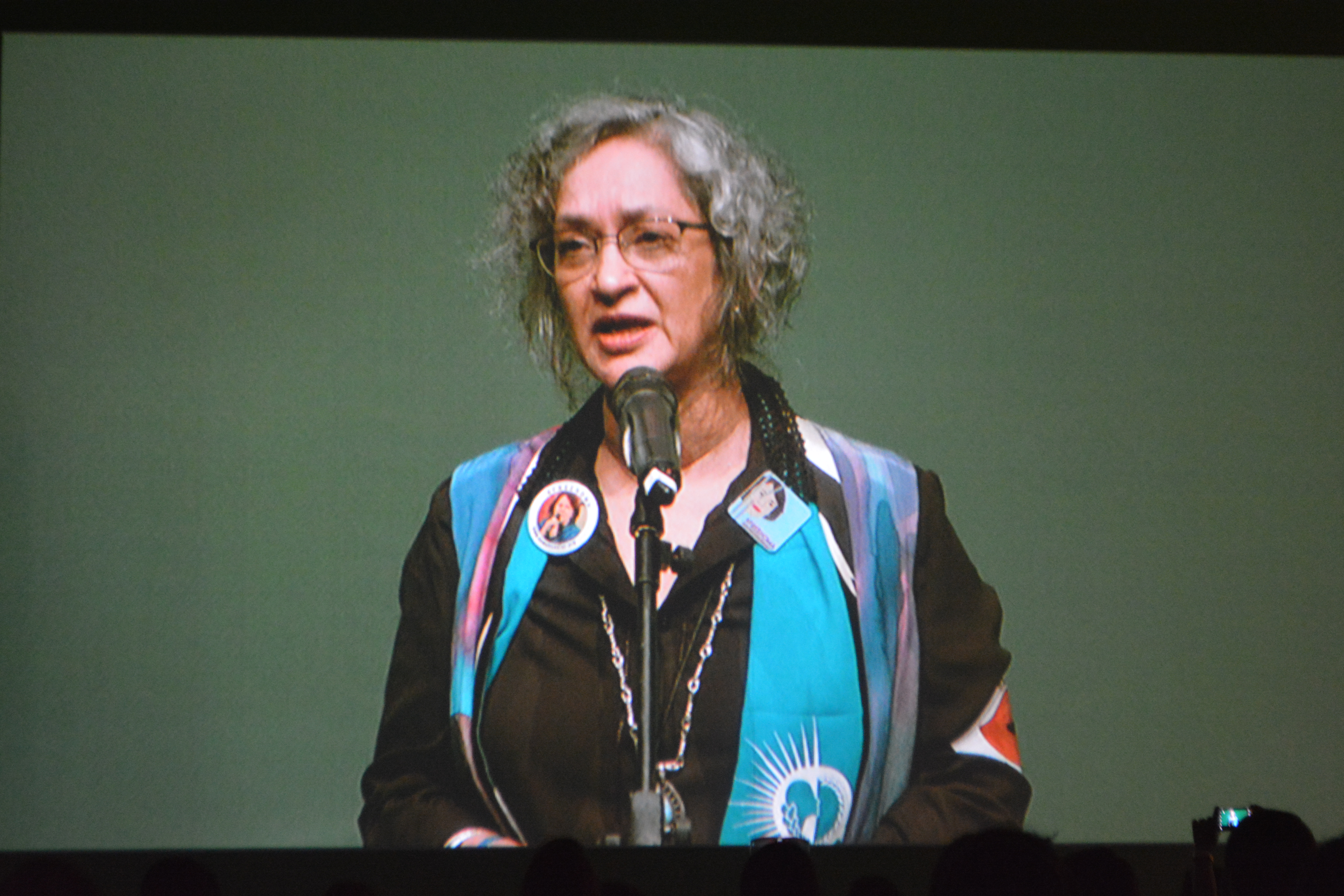
Shaheed at the AWID Forum 2016

Farida Shaheed (Urdu: فریدہ شہید) is a Pakistani sociologist and feminist human rights activist. In 2012, she was appointed the United Nations Special Rapporteur in the field of cultural rights, while she held that role in the field of education from 2022. She heads the Shirkat Gah women's resource centre in Pakistan, and is known for her extensive work on gender and class analysis, both in Pakistan and more globally.

== Work ==
Shaheed has over 25 years of research and activist experience, using a gender and feminist lens on issues of rural development, labour, culture, religion and the state. She has particularly focused on promoting and protecting cultural rights through policies and projects for marginalised communities, including women, the impoverished, religious and ethnic minorities. Shaheed is also an expert in international, regional and national negotiations, including within the United Nations and Pakistan.

Shaheed is a founding member of the Pakistani women's rights network, Women's Action Forum (WAF) and a member of the transnational feminist network Women Living Under Muslim Laws (WLUML). She served as United Nations Special Rapporteur in the field of cultural rights from 2009 to 2015, when the role was taken over by Karima Bennoune. In August 2022 she was appointed Special Rapporteur on the right to education.

== Awards and recognition ==
On 12 November 2014, Shaheed was awarded the International Award UCLG – Mexico City Culture 21, for her work on gender, culture, religion and the state. She had previously received several other awards, including the Pakistan Prime Minister's Award for her co-authored book, Two Steps Forward, One Step Back.

== Selected publications ==
In 2010, Shaheed authored the article Contested Identities: Gendered Politics, Gendered Religion in Pakistan for the special edition of Third World Quarterly.

In 1998, Shaheed edited, with Sohail Akbar Warraich, Cassandra Balchin and Aisha Gazdar, the book Shaping Women's Lives: Laws, Practices and Strategies in Pakistan. It was published by Shirkat Gah.

In 1987, she wrote the book Women of Pakistan: Two Steps Forward, One Step Back? with Khawar Mumtaz, chronicling Muslim women's movements in South Asia from the turn of the 20th century up till the mid-1980s.

In 2004, with Aisha L F Shaheed, she wrote Great Ancestors: Women Asserting Rights in Muslim Contexts. The book was conceived of as a training module for women human rights activists with a companion book of historical and biographical information. The two volumes were published by Shirkat Gah and was republished as a stand-alone monograph by Oxford University Press.

== See also ==
- National Women's Day (Pakistan)
