= Tehrik-e-Niswan =

Women's organisation in Pakistan

Tehrik-e-Niswan (Urdu: تحریک نسواں) (The Women's Movement) is a women's organization in Pakistan. Tehrik-e-Niswan was formed in 1979 in Karachi, Sindh by Sheema Kermani. It was founded to use the performing arts as a medium for giving human rights-related messages to working class women and the marginalized communities. Soon after its formation, in 1980, Zia-ul-Haq's regime, banned the dance performances, which the Tehrik used as a medium for spreading the message of peace, equality and harmony for women.

Tehrik's initial focus was on organizing seminars and workshops taking up women issues and now organizes cultural and creative activity like Theatre and Dance to convey its message. Tehrik-e-Niswan performed many political plays. It performed theatres in literary events, theatre festivals, conferences, shrines even hospitals. The Tehrik organised dance festivals to promote peace in society.

== Notable works ==
- Song of Mohenjodaro
- Kirchi Kirchi Karachi
- Manto Mera Dost and Jinnay Lahore Nahi Vekhiya

== See also ==
- Women's Action Forum
- All Pakistan Women's Association
- Blue Veins
- Women's rights
