= Sindh Museum =

- موزه سندھ
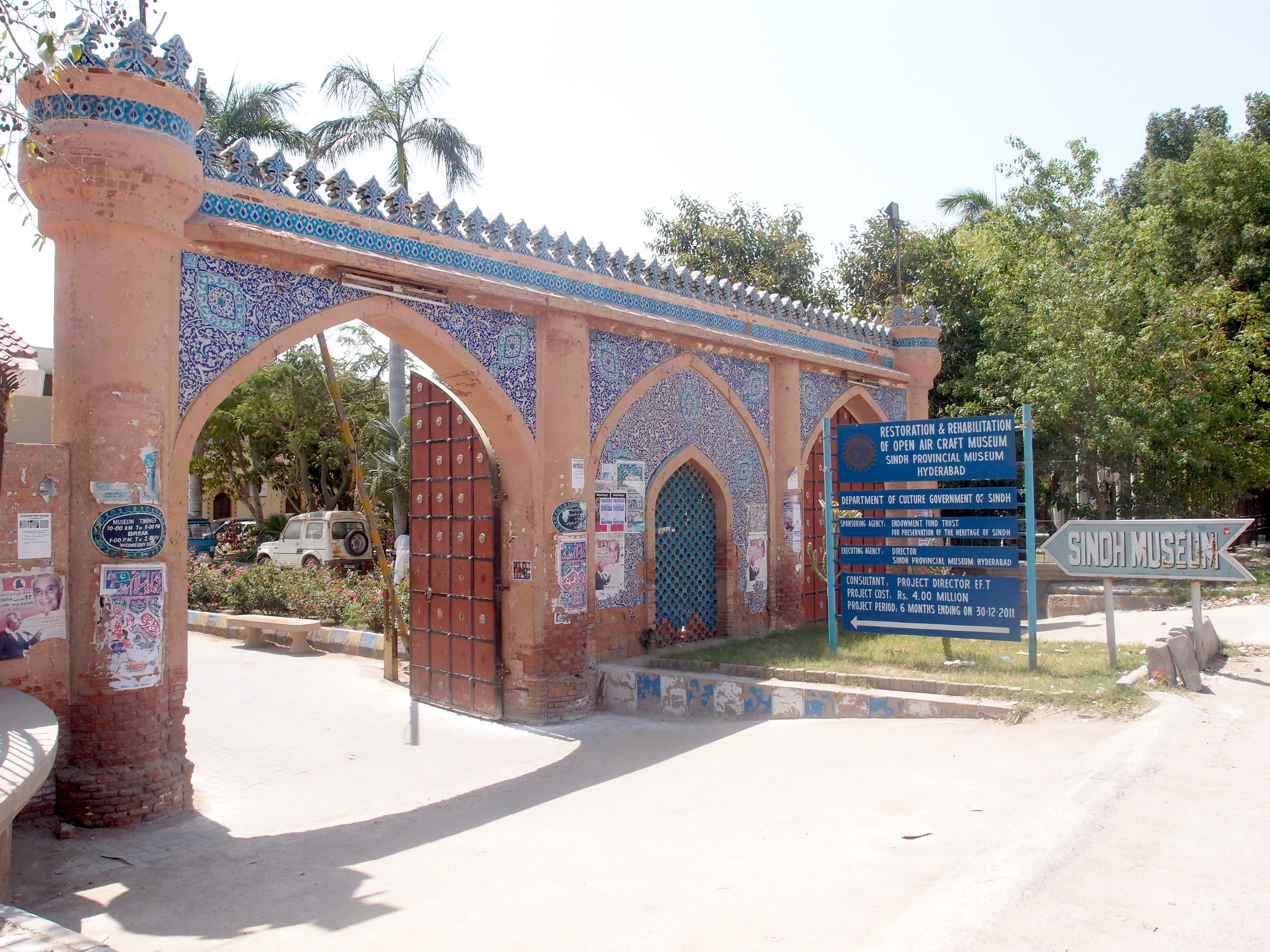
- Established: 1971; 55 years ago
- Location: Rani Bagh, Qasimabad, Hyderabad, Sindh, Pakistan
- Coordinates: 25.384831495437464°N 68.33793520389847°E
- Type: Archaeology museum
- Director: Syed Muhammad Raza Rizvi

The Sindh Museum (Urdu: موزه سندھ) is a museum located in Hyderabad, Sindh, Pakistan. The museum was established in 1971 to collect, preserve, study, and exhibit the records of the cultural history of Sindh. It also sometimes hosts cultural fairs.

== Collection ==
The museum features the history and heritage of the Sindh and the Indus Valley civilization. Items from various ruling periods of Sindh, including Samma, Soomra, Kalhora, and Talpur periods can be viewed by the visitors. The museum also showcases the past and present village lifestyle of Sindh.

The museum is divided into two sections – one housing the display galleries, while the other is an open-air area.

== Gallery ==
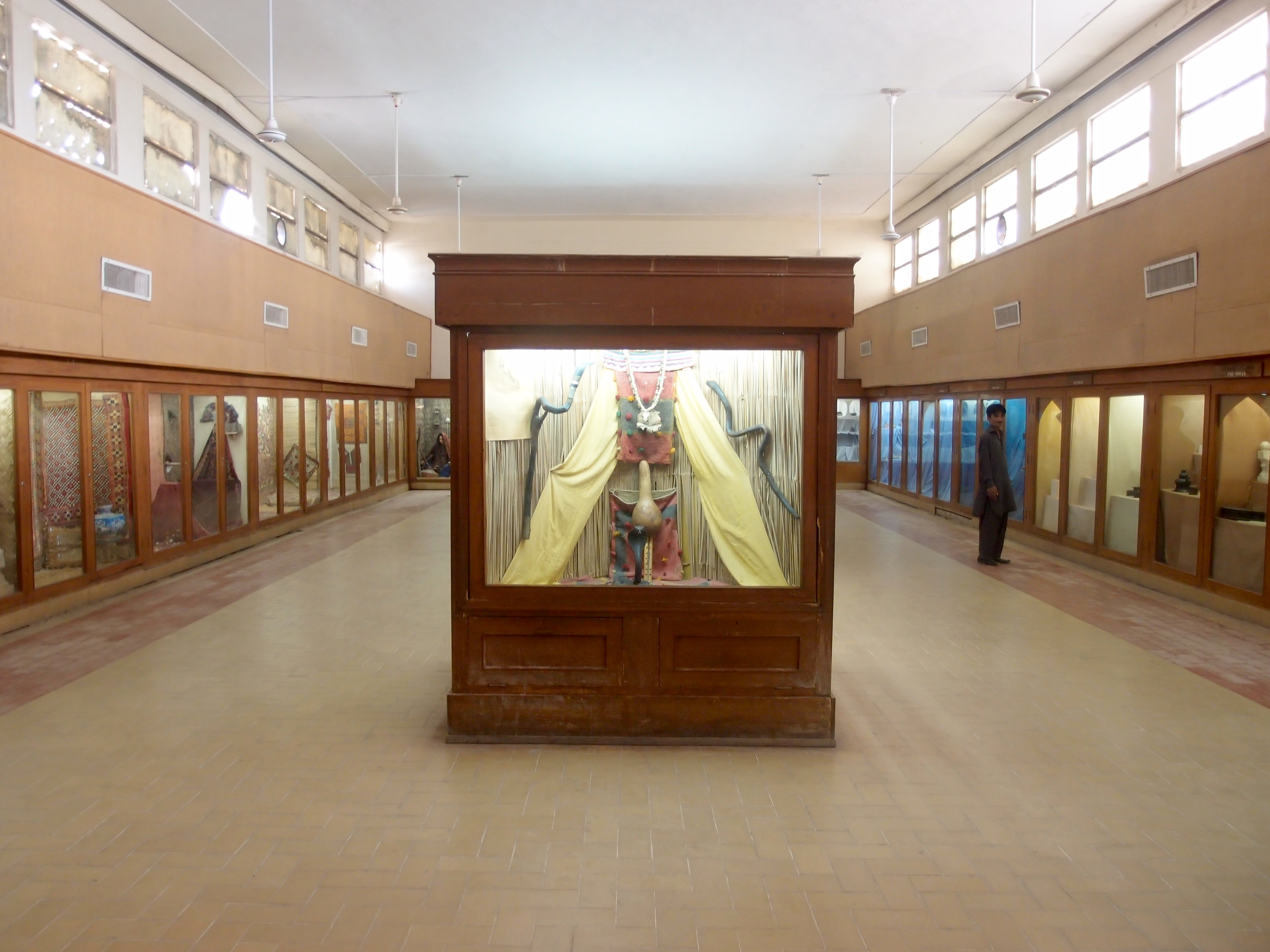

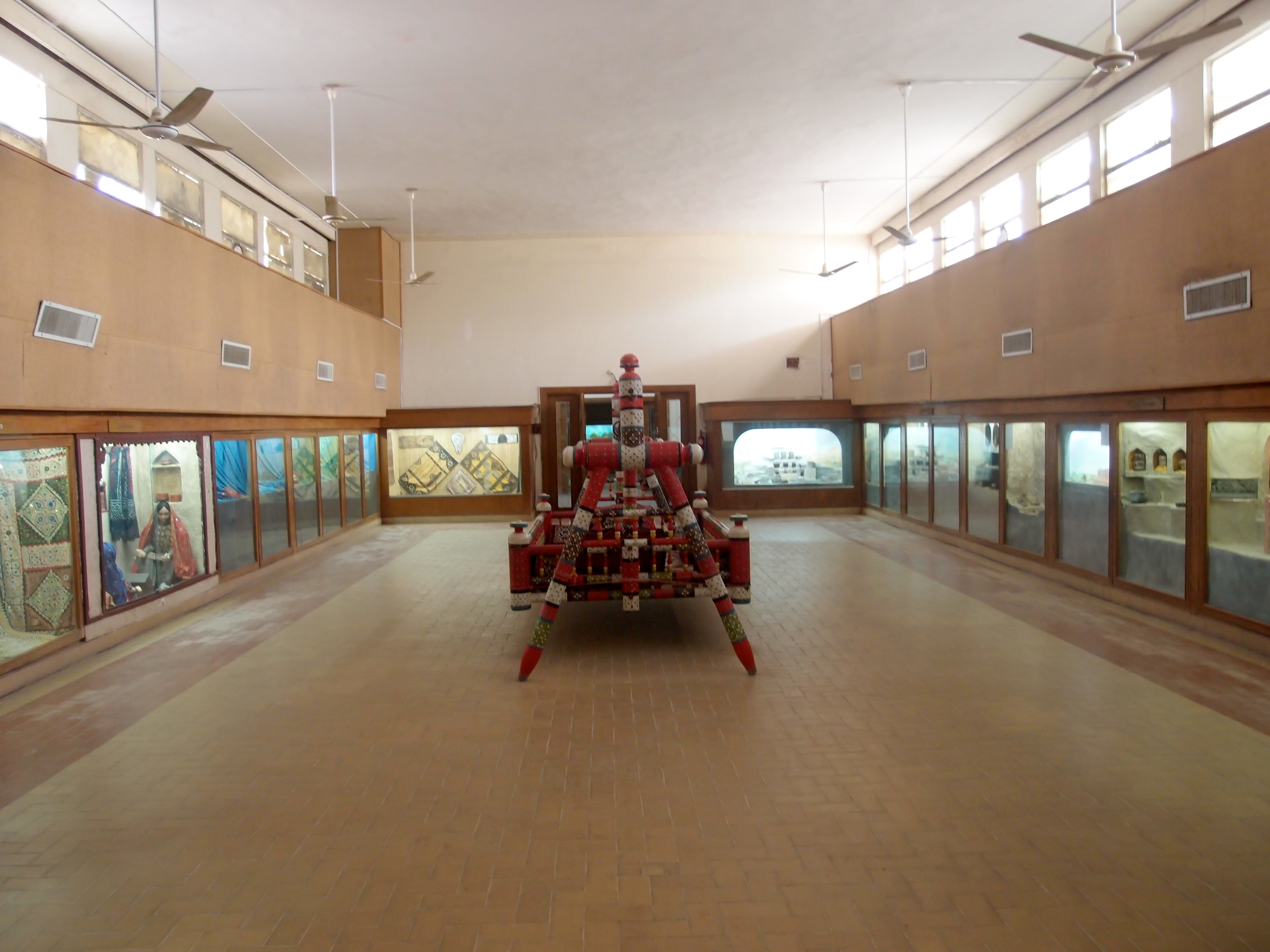

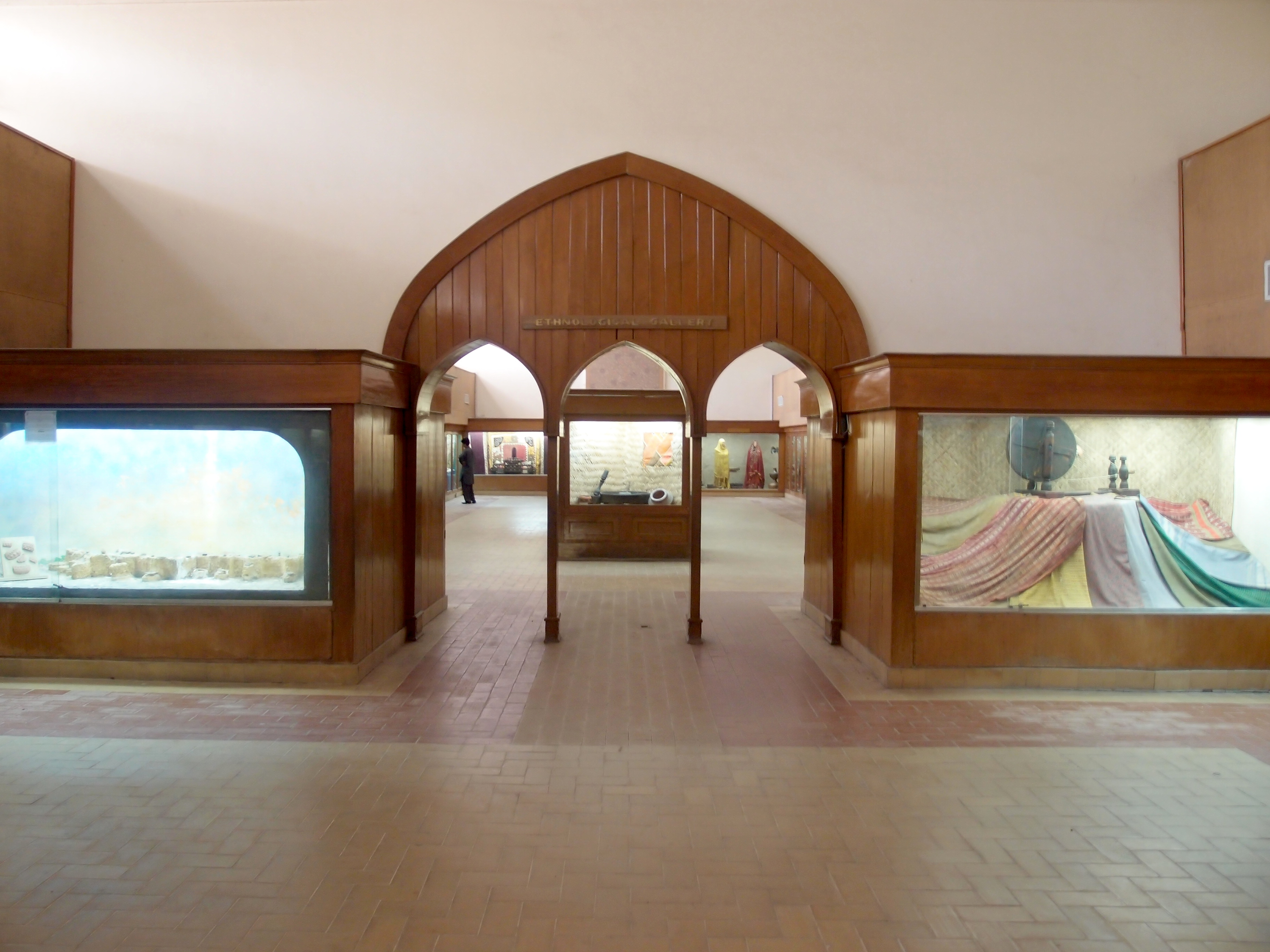

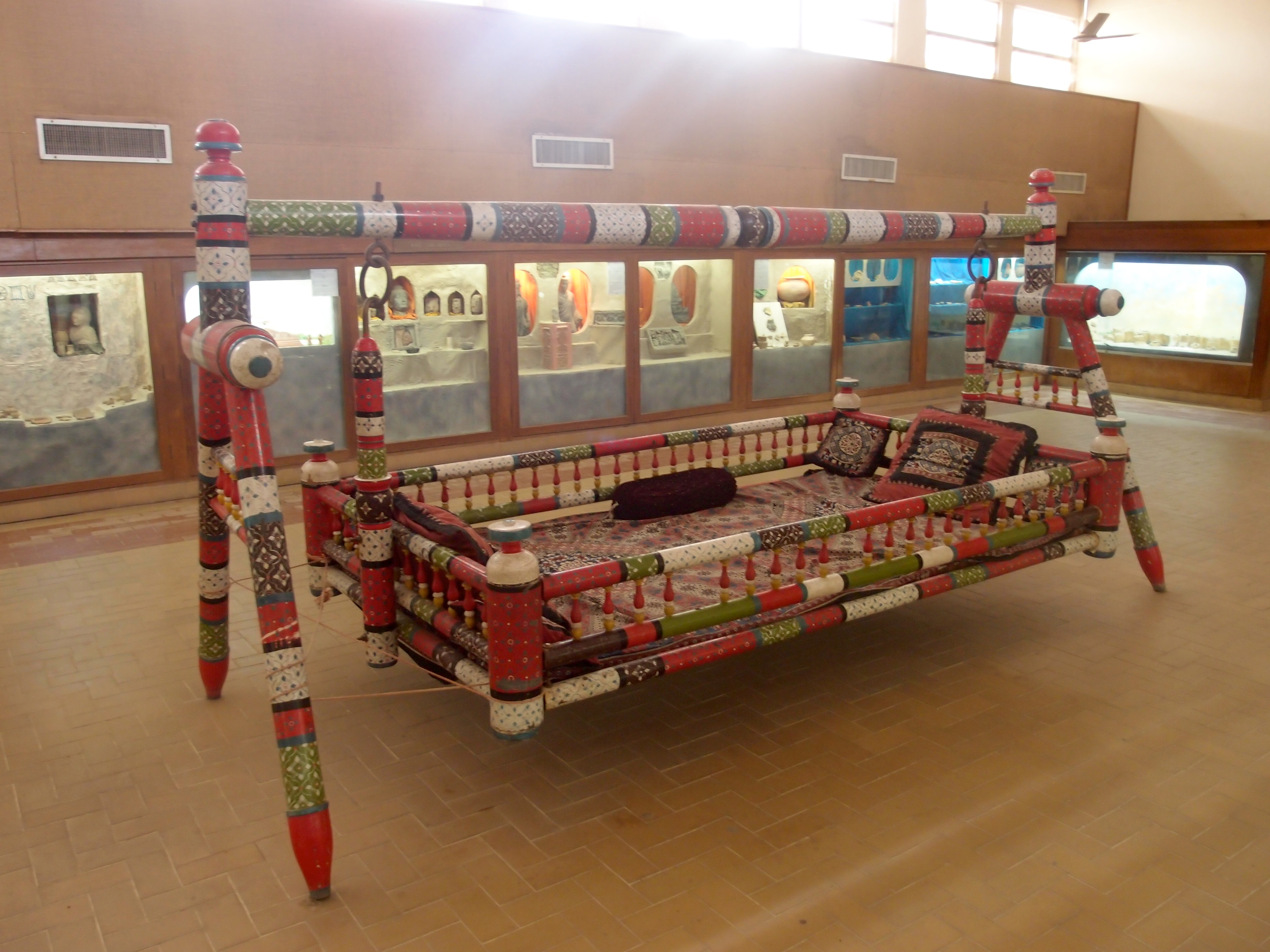
