= Anis Haroon =

Pakistani politician

Provincial Minister of Sindh
- Incumbent
- Assumed office 2013

Former Chairperson - National Commission on the Status of Women

Personal details
- Born: 9 August 1947 (age 79)
- Occupation: Women's rights activist

Anis Haroon is a Pakistani women's rights activist and former caretaker Provincial Minister of Sindh who served in the 2013 caretaker ministry.

From 2009 until 2012, she was chairperson of the National Commission on the Status of Women. In 2016, her autobiography was launched.

== Early life and education ==
Haroon was born to a family of Hyderabad Deccan descent. She holds a degree in LLB from University of Karachi.
