= Gender gap in Pakistan =

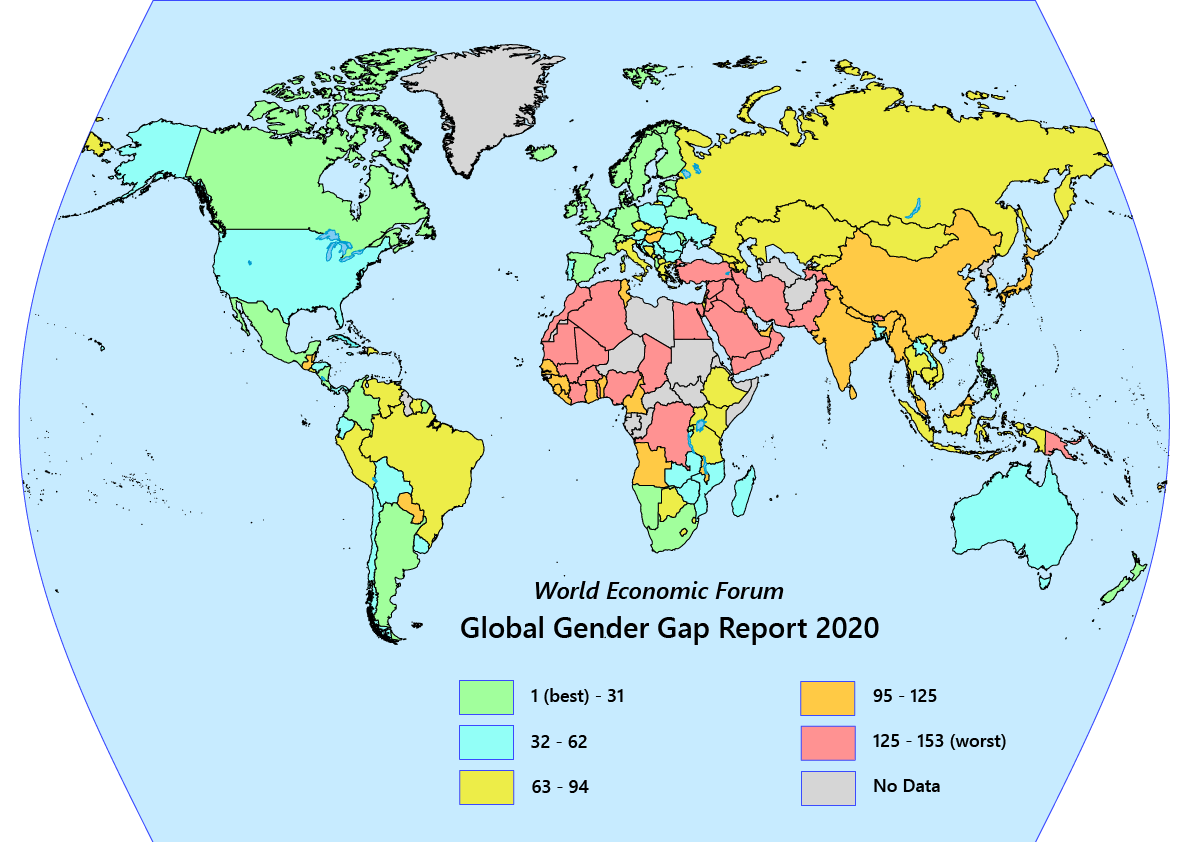
Global Gender Gap Report 2020

The gender gap in Pakistan refers to the differences between men and women in Pakistan in terms of social, political, and economic participation and rights. The gender gap uses the gender ratio of Pakistan to compare the disparities between men and women in different fields, which mainly disadvantage women. According to the Global Gender Gap Index 2022, Pakistan ranks second to last in terms of the gender gap, with only 56.4% of its gender gap closed, a 0.8 percentage point increase from 2021. By percentage, men form about 51.46% and women form about 48.54% of the total population of Pakistan. The sex ratio of Pakistan is 106.010, meaning there are about 106 men for every 100 women in Pakistan..

== Demographic disparity ==
=== General population gap ===
Provisional results from the 2017 6th Population & Housing Census indicated that Pakistan had 106,449,322 men, 101,314,780 women, and 10,418 transgender people. By percentage, men form 51%, women 48.76%, and transgender people 0.24% of the total population of Pakistan. The male-female sex ratio of Pakistan is 105.07, which means there are 105 men for 100 women in Pakistan.

According to 2018 estimates by the World Bank, women constitute 48.54% of the Pakistani population.

=== Population gap by age group ===
By 2018 estimates, the sex ratio at birth stands at 1.05 males born for every female. It peaks at 1.08 males/female for the 25–54 years age group and reaches its lowest point at 0.87 males/female for the 65+ years age group.

=== Population gap by location ===
There is a gender gap in the demographics of rural versus urban populations as documented by the 2017 census. There are a total of 67,300,171 males vs 64,886,593 females (ratio: 1.03) in rural areas whereas there are 39,149,151 males vs 36,428,187 females (ratio: 1.07) in urban areas. The provinces/territories with the greatest noted disparity include Balochistan (sex ratio: 1.10) and Islamabad (sex ratio: 1.11).

=== Infanticide, sex-selective abortion and neonatal abandonment ===
There is a documented practice of female infanticide, sex-selective abortion, and abandonment of newborn female children in Pakistan. According to the Edhi Foundation, 1210 female babies were killed in Pakistan in 2010 while an estimated 200 pregnancies were aborted on the basis of female sex and up to 90% of babies abandoned to the care of the Edhi Foundation were female. Later reports confirmed a continuing rise in the number of female infanticides.

According to Bongaarts, Pakistan has the fifth highest Sex Ratio at Last Birth (SLRB), which may indicate a high rate of sex-selective abortions.

== Health disparity ==
=== Childhood mortality ===
According to the Filmer & King, a female child in India or Pakistan has a 30-50% higher chance of dying between the first and fifth years of life. This difference may be attributable to poor nutrition, lack of preventive care and delays in seeking medical care.

=== Healthcare utilization ===
In line with patterns observed across South Asia, men in Pakistan play a decision-making role in women's access to healthcare including their utilization of healthcare services in the event of an emergency. Cultural barriers also include restrictions on women's mobility when unaccompanied by men.

== Education ==
=== Educational disparity ===
With more than 22.8 million children between the ages of 5-16 not in school, Pakistan has the second highest number of children who do not receive a formal education. This lack of education for children in Pakistan, while affecting all children, is more pronounced for girls as they face higher rates of dropping out of school and being illiterate, creating a gender gap. Out of 146 countries, Pakistan ranks 135 in regard to the gender gap in educational attainment. Only 45.8% of the female population is literate compared to 69.5% of the male population, according to 2015 estimates. Additionally, 59% of girls, compared to 49% of boys, no longer go to school by the time they reach the sixth grade. The school life expectancy (number of years of education from primary to tertiary) of female children is 8 years versus 9 years for male children. According to 2018 data from UNESCO, the net enrollment in primary education is 61.61% for female children whereas it is 73.37% for male children.

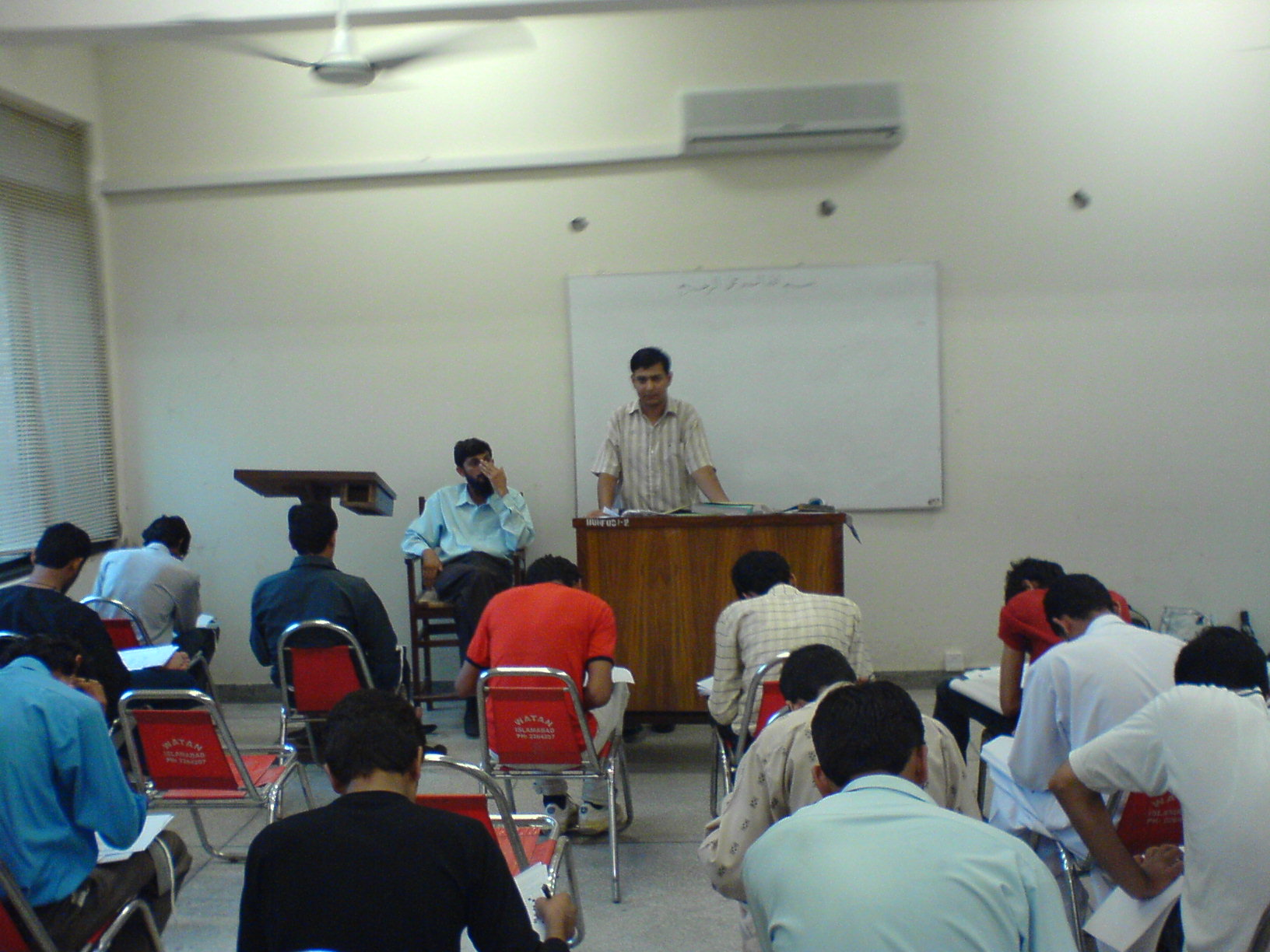
A standard classroom in Pakistan

While the country of Pakistan has low educational numbers, the gender gap present in education also differs by location, as certain areas hold higher differences in educational attainment and enrollment between girls and boys than others. In rural areas, which compromise about 68% of the population of the country, the number of boys enrolled is about 1.5 times more than the number of enrolled girls, with 11.5 million boys and 7.6 million girls. In urban areas, the number of students enrolled is significantly less with the number of boys enrolled being 1.1 times bigger than the number of girls, with 7.5 million boys in school and 6.5 million girls. In areas with poor school enrollment such as Balochistan, a majority of women never attended school, approximately 70%, while less than half, 40%, of men never enrolled.

=== Reasons for educational gender inequality ===
There are multiple factors that contribute to the large gender gap in educational attainment in Pakistan. Poverty is a prominent issue in Pakistan, with 3 million more people expected to live in poverty since 2018, with about 22% of the population living below the poverty line. As a result of the poverty issue in Pakistan, many parents, especially in rural areas where poverty is more prominent, could not afford to send their child to school as primary education was not free. However, in an attempt to increase educational enrollment the government made education free and compulsory from ages 5 to 16. While this did increase the number of young children attending school, the costs of uniforms, transportation, as well as school supplies still proved a barrier in poor areas and the government did not enforce the compulsory aspect of primary education. Additionally, the government has a low education budget, only spending around 2% of its total GDP. Due to this low investment in education, there is often a shortage of government schools and thus limited access to education. Furthermore, as a result of this shortage, many schools have too many children and this can disincentivize parents from sending their children to school. Therefore, many poor families do not, or can not, send their children, particularly daughters, to get educated as they do not have the means to do so or if they have they prefer sending boys over girls as they are considered bread winner of the house.

This lack of enrollment in education, while affecting both boys and girls has a more prominent effect on young girls due to social culture and social norms. Pakistan is a patriarchal country where many traditional social norms and standards exist. As a result of this, many women are often seen and taught to be in charge of the private sphere as men are expected to carry out functions of the public sphere. Since education is primarily seen as a way to get a good job and have a steady income, many families and parents do not find this applicable to their daughters as most women in Pakistan do not hold a paying job and are responsible for taking care of the family. Additionally, the opportunity cost of sending their daughters to school can also be a barrier to education for girls. Often in Pakistani society, most of the housework is done by the women in the family, including the daughters. Thus, sending their daughter to school can take away from many families' housework efficiency.

== Economic disparity ==
=== Economic participation ===
Global comparison of the ratio of female to male participation in the labor force

In terms of economic participation and opportunity, Pakistan has a 66.9% gender gap, meaning men have 66.9% higher economic participation and opportunity in Pakistan. The labor force in Pakistan is highly gendered, with women making up about 22.63 percent of it while men make up the other 84.79 percent. While there is a large gap in the gender makeup of the labor force, there has been

Between 1974-1975 only 1.3 million women were in the labor force compared to 17.9 million men but in 2012-2013 there were 13.3 million women in the labor force in comparison to 45.7 million men. However, Pakistan still ranks low in terms of gender equality in the labor force globally.

One factor that affects employment is marriage, as 60% of not working women are married while only 17% of not working men are married. Thus, marital status also affects the gender gap in the workforce as more married women do not pursue a paying career. The areas in which male and female employees are designated to and work in also differs, as the majority of working women are in agriculture, followed by craft services and then unskilled workers. Very few women are in the professional jobs, which are mainly male dominated. Professional and managerial participation of women remained low, with women comprising only 7.4% of STEM professionals working in the field. Women employed in the formal

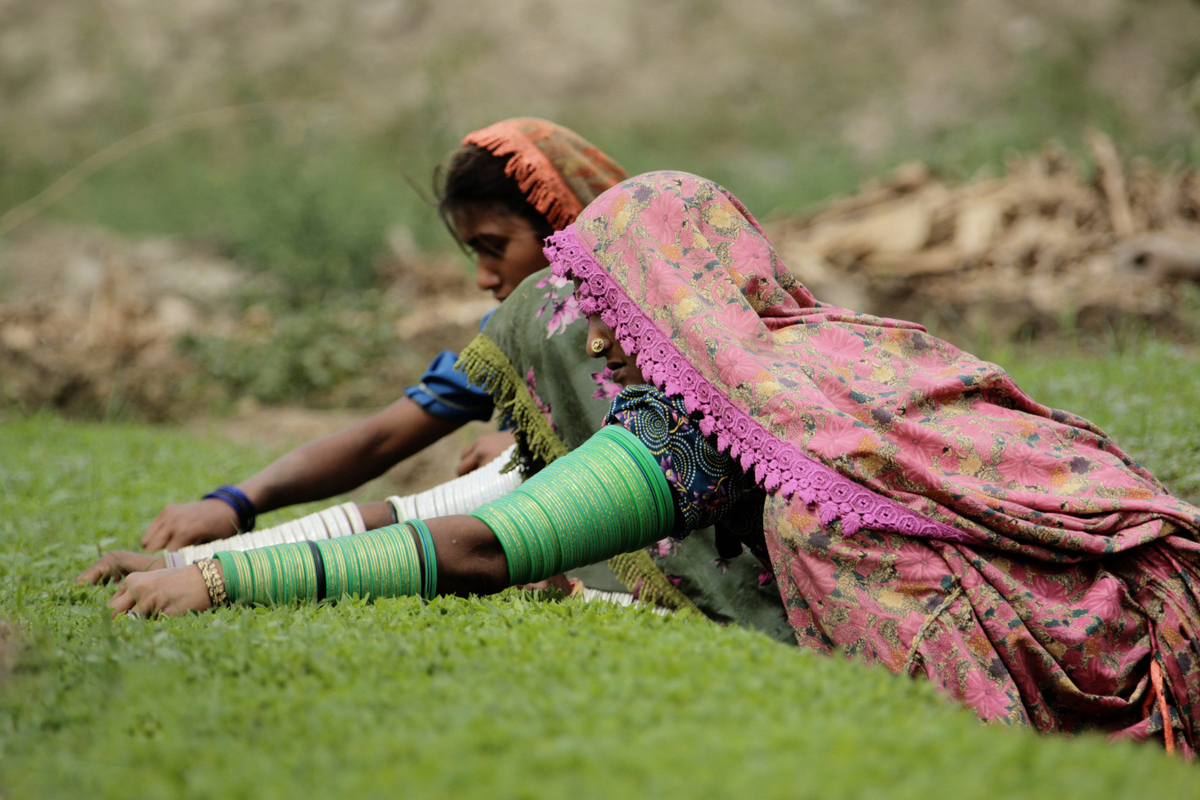
Women in Pakistan working in agricultural fields.

sector also worked excessive hours versus men, and women with 10 years of education or more were noted as having high rates of underemployment or unemployment. Childcare labor was intentionally excluded from this study. Access to physical and financial capital significantly lags behind men, with only 5% of women above the age of 15 having bank accounts versus 21% of men according to Status Report on Women's Economic Participation and Empowerment.Additionally, only 2% of women had received a loan from a financial institution, 2% owned land, and 7.4% women had joint ownership of a house.

=== Wage gap ===
Pakistan has the highest wage gap in the world, according to the International Labor Organization; women in Pakistan earn 34% less than men on average. Women in Pakistan make significantly less than their male counterparts, earning 16.3 per cent of their income. This makes the monthly income of Pakistani women about 15-20 USD. The Global Wage Report 2018/2019 also found women in Pakistan constitute 90% of the bottom 1% of wage earners in the country.

=== Contributing factors and results ===
Since Pakistan has many traditional societies, many women in Pakistan perform unpaid labor in the form of housework and childcare. As these tasks are usually designated to women due to gender stereotypes, many women do not have the time to perform paid jobs in addition to household work. However, these household jobs do not come with an income and therefore, 47% of women are unpaid family workers. Thus, the gendered stereotypes not only limit women's economic participation but also their own economic means and opportunities in the form of money. Additionally, while women do not have the same income levels as men from the wage gap and gender stereotypes, the educational gender gap also disadvantages women as education and employment are positively correlated. Furthermore, for women who hold jobs without a formal education, they are likely to earn 3.5 times less than someone working with a graduate degree, or 2 times less than someone with a primary education. Thus, the economic gender gap and educational are intertwined, creating a cycle where poor women do not receive a formal education and this then keeps them stuck in poverty.

== Legal disparity ==
=== Requirements for testimony ===
Article 25 of the Constitution of Pakistan prohibits discrimination on the basis of sex. However, under Article 17 of the Qanun-e-Shahdat (1984), women's witness is discounted to half of a man's witness.

=== Right to divorce ===
Muslim women in Pakistan have the right to obtain a khula, in which case they may forfeit their dower, but do not have the right to divorce unless it is delegated to them by the husband at the time of signing the marriage contract. There is no such limitation on men's right to divorce.

== Political disparity ==
=== Voting ===
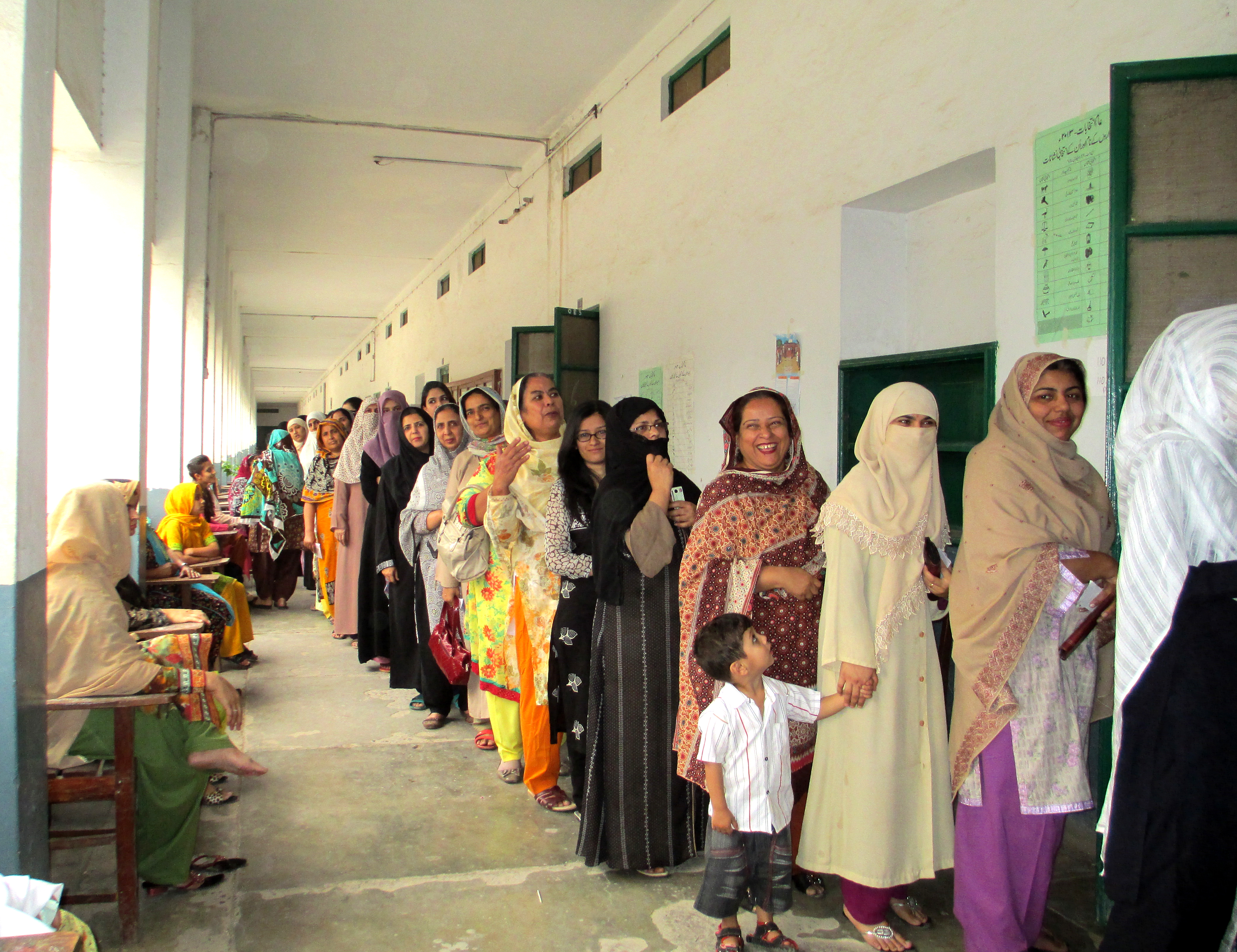
Women lining up to vote in a 2013 election in Pakistan.

Women in Pakistan did not have access to voting rights for centuries but gained this right in 1956. However, local bans have existed in parts of the country and have prevented women from voting; in addition, technical prerequisites such as CNIC registration for voting have had unintended effects of disenfranchising female voters in areas where male family members do not approve of female relatives obtaining CNICs. A CNIC is a national identity card in Pakistan that can be issued after a person turns 18. The CNIC is a computerized

version of the card and is required for anyone who wants to vote in Pakistan. The CNIC includes basic information such as the citizen's name, photograph, thumbprint, age, and father's (or husband's) name for women. While the CNIC is available to both men and women, getting a CNIC is more of a barrier for women as more women do not get the card because they do not have support from their family or husbands.

Although the gap is closing, as in 2008 there were 31 polling stations where no woman had turned out to vote and then in the 2013 general elections, there were 13 polling stations where no woman had turned out to vote on polling day, this gap is still prominent. In the 2018 election, the gap between male and female voters was at 12.5 million. According to the Electoral Commission of Pakistan's final rolls for 2018, only 44.1% of registered voters in Pakistan were female. The gender electoral roll imbalance increased from 10.97 percent in the 2013 general elections to 12.49 percent in 2018 elections. This gender gap is the largest in Balochistan province (15.65 percent), followed by Khyber Pakhtunkhwa (KP) (13.65), Sindh (11.02), and Punjab (11.095). Around 65% of National Assembly constituencies had a gender gap of more than 10%- particularly in Punjab and Khyber Pakhtunkhwa. Due to the gender gap in CNIC registration, it is estimated that it will take about 18 years to rectify this gap and have equal voting numbers between men and women.

=== Representation in government ===
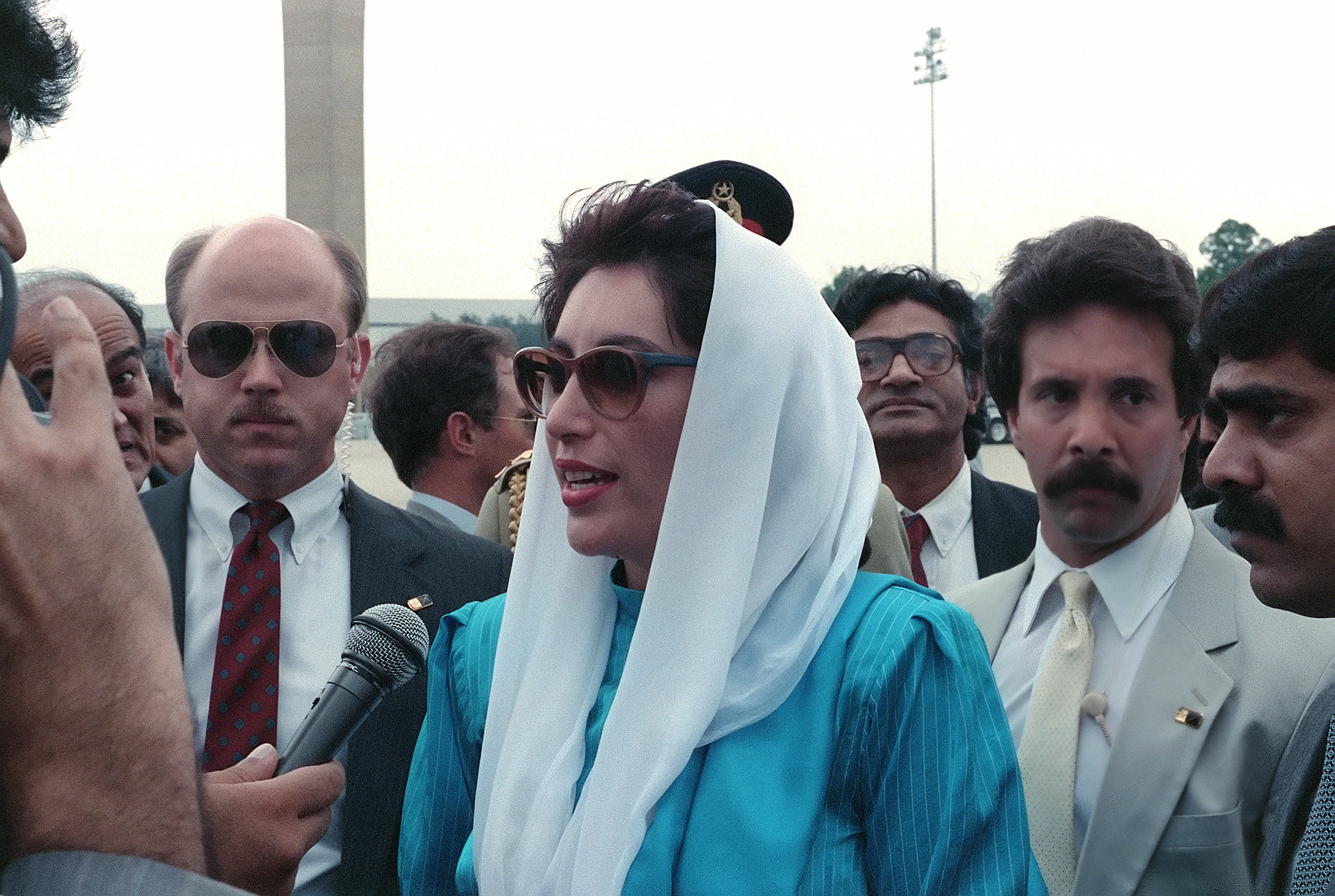
Benazir Bhutto, the first and only woman to be elected as Prime Minister in Pakistan.

Pakistan's political representation is mainly men, with few women being elected to the National Assembly. In order to combat this gap, Pakistan instituted a gender quota in the form of reserved seats. The Pakistani Constitution mandates that 17% of the seats in the National Assembly be reserved for women. Between 2017-2018, women constituted 20% of the Parliament and in the National Assembly. The introduction of women into politics has also had numerous effects on the legislative behavior in Pakistani politics as in 2017-2018 when there were 20% of elected women, they introduced an average of 25 agenda items versus the average of 6 agenda items introduced by male Parliamentarians. Women lawmakers on average also attended more sittings of both the Senate and the National Assembly (64% and 67% respectively) than male colleagues did during the same period (59% and 54% respectively).

=== Reasons for the gap ===
The social acknowledgement of politics as part of the public sphere, which is considered the man's responsibility has proven to be a barrier for women participating and getting elected into office. Many women find it difficult to enter public office as it is seen as a masculine area, fit for men and unfit for women. Thus, these social stigmas and social norms keep women feeling separated from politics as a whole. Additionally, the traditional culture in Pakistan usually delegates household responsibilities to women, as mentioned previously. Thus, many women find it difficult to find the time to run and are accused of neglecting their children and home in their desire for a political career. Another gap lies in the gender makeup of party leaders. In Pakistan all of the party elites and leaders are male, who would occasionally leave women candidates out of important decisions and be less likely to support a female candidate. Additionally, in Pakistan men and women are usually kept separate in certain public areas, such as there may be two voting lines, one for men and women. This ensures the protection and comfort of citizens. However, in certain government offices there are not adequate accommodations for women as there as there are not certain spaces designated for women, such as a female visiting area.

== Cultural disparity ==
=== Media participation ===
According to the Federal Union of Journalists, less than 5% of journalists in Pakistan are women.
