= Democratic Women's Association =

Pakistani political organization

The Democratic Women's Association was a political organization led by Tahira Mazhar Ali in Pakistan in 1950. The organization was founded with the intention of including workers' rights with women's right in Pakistan. It was the first leftist organization in Pakistan that represented women's rights.

It was a grassroots movement beginning its work in small neighborhoods and involved mobilization of women and workers.

== Leadership ==
Tahira Mazhar Ali was the founding General Secretary for the DWA. This allowed for coalitions that helped her further her agenda in the national politics of Pakistan.

The political organization ran with the Communist Party of Pakistan (CPP).

== Core Members ==
- Tahira Mazhar Ali - Founder
- Hajra Masood
- Khadija Omar
- Amatul Rehman
- Alys Faiz
