= Women in Pakistan =

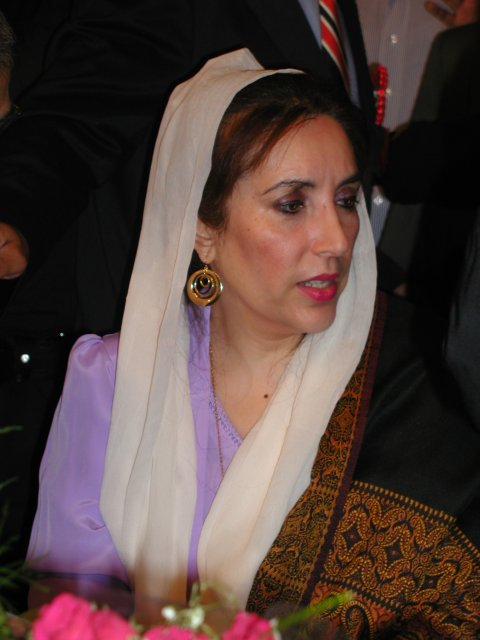
- Benazir Bhutto, the first female prime minister of Pakistan

Gender Inequality Index
- Value: 0.534 (2021)
- Rank: 135th out of 191

Global Gender Gap Index
- Value: 0.575 (2023)
- Rank: 142nd out of 146 (2023)

Women in Pakistan are as diverse as the country's population in terms of culture, religion, social status, political and community participation at local, national and global platforms. The socio-political and cultural factors including a prominent rural urban divide significantly shape the status of women across the region.

Women in Pakistan make up 48.76% of the population according to the 2017 census of Pakistan. Women in Pakistan have played an important role in Pakistani history and have had the right to vote since 1956. In Pakistan, women have held high office including Prime Minister, Speaker of the National Assembly, Leader of the Opposition, as well as federal ministers, judges, and serving commissioned posts in the armed forces, with Lieutenant General Nigar Johar attaining the highest military post for a woman. Benazir Bhutto was sworn in as the first woman Prime Minister of Pakistan on 2 December 1988.

Gender Concerns International reports that women's rights in Pakistan have improved overall, with the increasing number of educated and literate women. Yet, Pakistan continues to score poorly on the WPS Index in 2021, ranking 167th out of 170 countries, and has failed to make progress toward gender equality and women's rights. This score clearly reflects on existing social problems like gender inequality, domestic violence, workplace harassments, lack of decision-making power, illiteracy, limited opportunities and absence of adequate legal framework to address these challenges.

Pakistani women have been kept behind in the field of education due to low government funding, fewer schools and colleges for women, and a low enrollment rate of women in certain areas. The patriarchal system has created the social and cultural environment that is supporting persistence male domination, remains the major obstacle in the intellectual, social, and economic growth of women. Cases of rape, honor killing, murder, and forced marriages in backward areas are also reported. All these issues are related to lack of education, poverty, a skewed judicial system, the negligence of government authorities to implement laws and widespread underperformance of law enforcement agencies such as the Police.

== History ==
Pakistani women's historical experiences are deeply rooted in South Asian women's historical experiences tracing back to monarchy and colonization.

Intense political and religious transformations have left prominent marks on contemporary women's lives and the challenges they face.

== Role of Women in Education ==
Women in Pakistan have made significant contributions in the field of education. Many women have become renowned teachers, professors, scientists and educationists who have inspired generations. Access to education for girls has improved in recent years, but challenges remain in rural areas. UNICEF Pakistan Education ReportUNICEF Pakistan Education Report

== Political Context ==
Historical Framework

Muslim reformers such as Syed Ahmad Khan tried to bring education to women, limit polygamy, and empower women in other ways through education. The founder of Pakistan, Muhammad Ali Jinnah, was known to have a positive attitude towards women. After the independence of Pakistan, women's groups and feminist organizations initiated by prominent leaders like Fatima Jinnah started to emerge in order to eliminate socio-economic injustices against women in the country.

Jinnah pointed out that Muslim women leaders from all classes actively supported the Pakistan movement in the mid-1940s. Their movement was led by wives and other relatives of leading politicians. Women were sometimes organized into large-scale public demonstrations. Before 1947, there was a tendency for Muslim women in Punjab to vote for the Muslim League while their menfolk supported the Unionist Party.

Many Muslim women supported the Indian National Congress Quit India Movement. Some like Syeda Safia Begum of Muslim Town Lahore started the first English School for Muslim Children in Muslim Town in 1935. Pakistani women were granted the suffrage in 1947, and they were reaffirmed the right to vote in national elections in 1956 under the interim Constitution. The provision of reservation of seats for women in the Parliament existed throughout the constitutional history of Pakistan from 1956 to 1973.

Had General Ayub Khan run fair elections, Ms. Fatima Jinnah of Pakistan would have become the first Muslim President of the largest Muslim country in the world. However, despite that setback, during 1950–60, several pro-women initiatives were taken. Also, the first woman Lambardar or Numberdar (Village Head Person) in West Pakistan Begum Sarwat Imtiaz took oath in Village 43/12-L in Chichawatni, District Montgomery (now Sahiwal) in 1959. The 1961 Muslim Family Law Ordinance, which regulated marriage, divorce, and polygamy continues to have a significant legal impact on the women of Pakistan.

=== Zulfikar Ali Bhutto Government ===
Main Article: Zulfikar Ali Bhutto

The regime of Zulfikar Ali Bhutto (1970–1977) was a period of liberal attitudes towards women. All government services were opened to women including the district management group and the foreign service (in the civil service), which had been denied to them earlier. About 10% of the seats in the National Assembly and 5% in the provincial assemblies were reserved for women, with no restriction on contesting general seats. However, the implementation of these policies was poor as the Government faced a financial crisis due to war with India and consequent division of the country.

Gender equality was specifically guaranteed by the Constitution of Pakistan adopted in 1973. The constitution stipulated that "there shall be no discrimination on the basis of sex alone." The Constitution additionally affords the protection of marriage, family, the mother and the child as well as ensuring "full participation of women in all spheres of national life." However, many judges upheld the "laws of Islam", often misinterpreted, over the Constitution's guarantee of non-discrimination and equality under the law.

In 1975, an official delegation from Pakistan participated in the First World Conference on Women in Mexico, which led to the constitution of the first Pakistani Women's Rights Committee.

=== Zia-ul-Haq's Military Regime ===
General Zia ul-Haq, then Army Chief of Staff, overthrew the democratically elected Zulfikar Ali Bhutto government in a military coup on 5 July 1977. The Sixth Plan during the martial law régime of General Zia-ul-Haq (1977–1988) was full of policy contradictions. The régime took many steps toward institutional building for women's development, such as the establishment of the Women's Division in the Cabinet Secretariat, and the appointment of another commission on the Status of Women. A chapter on women in development was included for the first time in the Sixth Plan. The chapter was prepared by a working group of 28 professional women headed by Syeda Abida Hussain, chairperson of the Jhang District council at that time. The main objective as stated in the Sixth Plan was "to adopt an integrated approach to improve women's status". In 1981, General Zia-ul-Haq nominated the Majlis-e-Shoora (Federal Advisory Council) and inducted 20 women as members, however Majlis-e-Shoora had no power over the executive branch. In 1985, the National Assembly elected through non-party elections doubled women's reserved quota (20 percent).

However, Zia-ul-Haq initiated a process of Islamization by introducing discriminatory legislation against women such as the set of Hudood Ordinances and the Qanun-e-Shahadat Order (Law of Evidence Order). He banned women from participating and from being spectators of sports and promoted purdah. He suspended all fundamental rights guaranteed in the 1973 Constitution. He also proposed laws regarding Qisas and Diyat, Islamic penal laws governing retribution (qisas) and compensation (diyat) in crimes involving bodily injury. The Offence of Zina (Enforcement of Hudood) Ordinance, 1979 was a subcategory of the Hudood Ordinance. Zina is the crime of non-marital sexual relations and adultery.

Fatima Jinnah (1893–1967) was a Pakistani dental surgeon, biographer, stateswoman and one of the leading founders of Pakistan

A woman alleging rape was initially required to provide eyewitnesses of good standing and moral character (tazkiyah-al-shuhood) and the witnesses would have to witness "the act of penetration" for the death penalty to apply to the Rapist or if there was no witnesses then Ta'zir would apply. However failure to find such proof of the rape could place her at risk of prosecution for another hudood ordinance, qazf for accusing an innocent man of adultery. Qazf does not require such strong evidence. In principle, the failure to find such proof of rape does not place the woman herself at risk of prosecution. According to Mufti Taqi Usmani, who was instrumental in the creation of the ordinances:

If anyone says that she was punished because of Qazaf (false accusation of rape) then Qazaf Ordinance, Clause no. 3, Exemption no. 2 clearly states that if someone approaches the legal authorities with a rape complaint, she cannot be punished in case she is unable to present four witnesses. No court of law can be in its right mind to award such a punishment.

However, in practice, these safeguards have not always worked. In September 1981, the first conviction and sentence under the Zina Ordinance, of stoning to death for Fehmida and Allah Bakhsh were set aside under national and international pressure. In September 1981, women came together in Karachi in an emergency meeting to oppose the adverse effects on women of martial law and the Islamization campaign. They launched what later became the first full-fledged national women's movement in Pakistan, the Women's Action Forum (WAF). WAF staged public protests and campaigns against the Hudood Ordinances, the Law of Evidence, and the Qisas and Diyat laws (temporarily shelved as a result).

In 1983, an orphaned, thirteen-year-old girl, Jehan Mina was allegedly raped by her uncle and his sons, and became pregnant. She was unable to provide enough evidence that she was raped. She was charged with adultery and the court considered her pregnancy as the proof of adultery. She was awarded the Tazir punishment of one hundred lashes and three years of rigorous imprisonment.

In 1983, Safia Bibi, a nearly blind teenage domestic servant was allegedly raped by her employer and his son. Due to lack of evidence, she was convicted for adultery under the Zina ordinance, while the rapists were acquitted. She was sentenced to fifteen lashes, five years imprisonment, and a fine of 1,000 rupees. The decision attracted so much publicity and condemnation from the public and the press that the Federal Shariah Court of its own motion, called for the records of the case and ordered that she should be released from prison on her own bond. Subsequently, on appeal, the finding of the trial court was reversed and the conviction was set aside.

The International Commission of Jurists' December 1986 mission to Pakistan called for the repeal of the sections of the Hudood Ordinances relating to crimes and of Islamic punishments that discriminate against women and non-Muslims.

There is considerable evidence that legislation during this period has negatively impacted Pakistani women's lives and made them more vulnerable to extreme violence. The majority of women in prison had been charged under the Hudood Ordinance. Similarly, a national study found that 21% of those residing in shelters for women (Darul Aman) had Hudood cases against them. According to a 1998 report by Amnesty International, more than one-third of all Pakistani women in prison were being held due to having been accused or found guilty of zina.

=== Benazir Bhutto Government ===
Main Article: First Benazir Bhutto government

Also see: Second Benazir Bhutto government

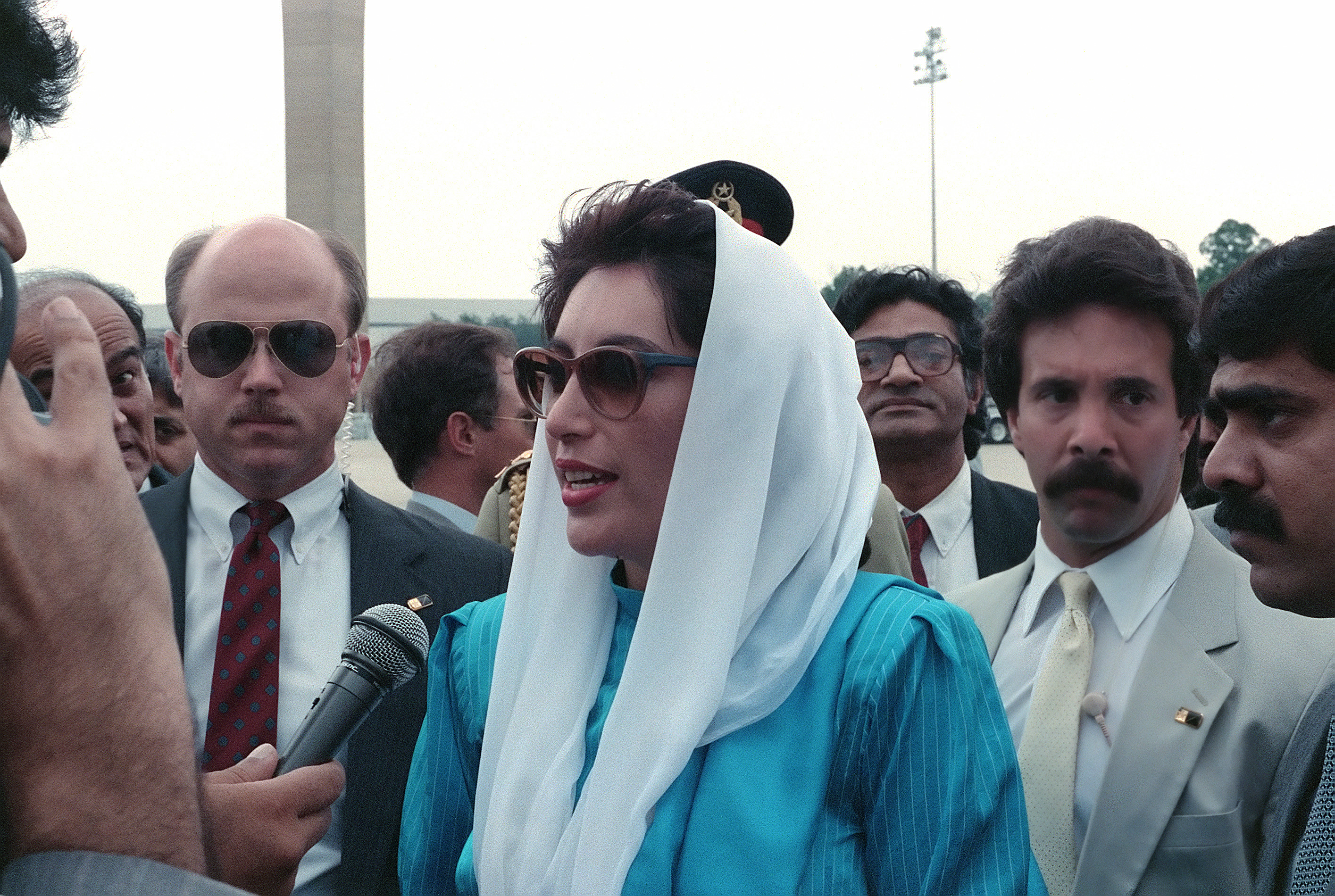
Benazir Bhutto became the first woman elected to lead a Muslim state. She was assassinated while campaigning for the Pakistani general election of 2008.

After Zia-ul-Haq's regime, there was a visible change in the policy context in favour of women. The Seventh, Eighth, and Ninth plans formulated under various democratically elected governments have clearly made efforts to include women's concerns in the planning process. However, planned development failed to address gender inequalities due to the gap between policy intent and implementation.

In 1988, Benazir Bhutto (Zulfiqar Ali Bhutto's daughter) became the first female Prime Minister of Pakistan, and the first woman elected to head a Muslim country. During her election campaigns, she voiced concerns over social issues of women, health and discrimination against women. She also announced plans to set up women's police stations, courts and women's development banks. She also promised to repeal controversial Hudood laws that curtailed the rights of women. However, during her two incomplete terms in office (1988–90 and 1993–96), Benazir Bhutto did not propose any legislation to improve welfare services for women. She was not able to repeal a single one of Zia-ul-Haq's Islamisation laws. By virtue of the eighth constitutional amendment imposed by Zia-ul-Haq, these laws were protected both from ordinary legislative modification and from judicial review.

In early 1988, the case of Shahida Parveen and Muhammad Sarwar sparked bitter public criticism. Shahida's first husband, Khushi Muhammad, had divorced her and the papers had been signed in front of a magistrate. The husband however, had not registered the divorce documents in the local council as required by law, rendering the divorce not legally binding. Unaware of this, Shahida, after her mandatory 96-day period of waiting (iddat), remarried. Her first husband, rebounding from a failed attempt at a second marriage, decided he wanted his first wife Shahida back. Shahida's second marriage was ruled invalid. She and her second husband, Sarwar were charged with adultery. They were sentenced to death by stoning. The public criticism led to their retrial and acquittal by the Federal Shariah Court.

The Ministry of Women's Development (MWD) established Women's Studies centres at five universities in Islamabad, Karachi, Quetta, Peshawar, and Lahore in 1989. However, four of these centres became almost non-functional due to lack of financial and administrative support. Only the centre at the University of Karachi (funded by the Canadian International Development Agency) was able to run a master of arts program.

The First Women Bank Ltd. (FWBL) was established in 1989 to address women's financial needs. FWBL, a nationalized commercial bank, was given the role of a development finance institution, as well as of a social welfare organization. It operates 38 real-time online branches across the country, managed and run by women. MWD provided a credit line of Rs 48 millions to FWBL to finance small-scale credit schemes for disadvantaged women. The Social Action Program launched in 1992/93 aimed at reducing gender disparities by improving women's access to social services.

Pakistan acceded to the Convention on the Elimination of All Forms of Discrimination Against Women (CEDAW) on 29 February 1996. The Ministry of Women Development (MWD) was the designated national focal machinery for its implementation. However MWD faced a lack of resources initially. Pakistan failed to submit its initial report that was due in 1997. Pakistan neither signed nor ratified the Optional Protocol of the Women's Convention, which has led to non-availability of avenues for filing grievances by individuals or groups against Pakistan under CEDAW.

=== Nawaz Sharif Government ===
Main Article: Nawaz Sharif

In 1997, Nawaz Sharif was elected as Prime Minister. He had also held office for a truncated term (1990–1993), during which he had promised to adopt Islamic law as the supreme law of Pakistan.

In 1997, the Nawaz Sharif government formally enacted the Qisas and Diyat Ordinance, which institutes shariah-based changes in Pakistan's criminal law. The ordinance had earlier been kept in force by invoking the president's power to re-issue it every four months.

Sharif then proposed a fifteenth amendment to the Constitution that would entirely replace the existing legal system with a comprehensive Islamic one and would override the "constitution and any law or judgment of any court." The proposal was approved in the National Assembly (lower house), where Sharif's party has a commanding majority, but, it remained stalled in the Senate after facing strong opposition from women's groups, human rights activists, and opposition political parties.

A 1997 ruling by the Lahore High Court, in the highly publicized Saima Waheed case, upheld a woman's right to marry freely but called for amendments to the 1965 Family Laws, on the basis of Islamic norms, to enforce parental authority to discourage "love marriages".

The report of the Inquiry of the Commission for Women (1997) clearly stated that the Hudood legislation must be repealed as it discriminates against women and is in conflict with their fundamental rights. A similar commission during Benazir Bhutto's administration had also recommended amending certain aspects of Hudood Ordinance. However, neither Benazir Bhutto nor Nawaz Sharif implemented these recommendations.

The enhancement of women's status was stated as one of the 16 goals listed in the Pakistan 2010 Program (1997), a critical policy document. However, the document omits women while listing 21 major areas of interests. Similarly, another major policy document, the "Human Development and Poverty Reduction Strategy" (1999), mentioned women as a target group for poverty reduction but lacks gender framework.

The country's first all-women university, named after Fatima Jinnah, was inaugurated on 6 August 1998. It suffered from delays in the release of development funds from the Federal Government.

=== Pervez Musharraf's regime ===
Main Article: Pervez Musharraf

In 2000, the Church of Pakistan ordained its first women deacons. In 2002 (and later during court trials in 2005), the case of Mukhtaran Mai brought the plight of rape victims in Pakistan under an international spotlight. On 2 September 2004, the Ministry of Women Development was made an independent ministry, separating from the Social Welfare and Education Ministry.

In July 2006, General Pervez Musharraf government started addressing controversies around Hudood Ordinance and start working on amendments to this controversial 1979 Hudood Ordinance introduced under Zia-ul-Haq's régime. He asked the Law Ministry and the Council of Islamic Ideology (under the Ministry of Religious Affairs) to build a consensus for the amendments to the laws. On 7 July 2006, General Musharraf signed an ordinance for the immediate release on bail of around 1,300 women who were currently languishing in jails on charges other than terrorism and murder.

In late 2006, the Pakistani parliament passed the Women's Protection Bill, repealing some of the Hudood Ordinances. The bill allowed for DNA and other scientific evidence to be used in prosecuting rape cases. The passing of the Bill and the consequent signing of it into law by President General Pervez Musharraf invoked protests from hardline Islamist leaders and organizations. Some experts also stated that the reforms would be impossible to enforce.

The Cabinet approved reservation of 10% quota for women in Central Superior Services in its meeting held on 12 July 2006. Earlier, there was a 5% quota for women across the board in all Government departments. In December 2006, Prime Minister Shaukat Aziz approved the proposal by the Ministry of Women Development to extend this quota to 10%.

In 2006, The Protection of Women (Criminal Laws Amendment) Act was also passed. In December 2006, for the first time, women cadets from the Military Academy Kakul assumed guard duty at the mausoleum of Muhammad Ali Jinnah.

The Women's Protection Bill, however, has been criticized by many including human rights and women's rights activists for only paying lipservice and failing to repeal the Hudood Ordinances.

=== President Asif Zardari Era ===
Main Article: Asif Ali Zardari

Asif Ali Zardari was the 11th President of Pakistan. He is the widower of Benazir Bhutto, who twice served as Prime Minister of Pakistan. When his wife was assassinated in December 2007, he became the leader of the Pakistan People's Party. On 30 December 2007 he became co-chairman of the PPP, along with his son Bilawal Bhutto Zardari. On 8 September 2013, Asif Ali Zardari became the country's first president to complete his constitutional term.

==== Women in Assemblies ====
Female member of parliament and party loyalist Dr. Fehmida Mirza was appointed as the first female speaker in South Asia. During her tenure, Pakistan saw its first female foreign minister, Hina Rabbani Khar, its first secretary of defence, Nargis Sethi, deputy speaker of a province Shehla Raza and numerous female ministers, ambassadors, secretaries including Farahnaz Ispahani, Media Advisor to former President of Pakistan and co-chairman PPP, Sherry Rehman former ambassador of Pakistan to US, Fauzia Wahab, Firdous Ashiq Awan, Farzana Raja, Shazia Marri, Sharmila Faruqi, Musarat Rafique Mahesar, Shahida Rehmani and others held prestigious positions within the administration.

==== Legislation for protection of women ====
On 29 January 2010, the President signed the 'Protection against Harassment of Women at the Workplace Bill 2009' which the parliament adopted on 21 January 2010. Two additional bills were signed into law by the President in December 2012 criminalizing the primitive practices of Vani, watta-satta, swara and marriage to the Quran, which used women as tradable commodities for the settlement of disputes, as well as punishing acid-throwing by life imprisonment. The government further established a special task force in the interior Sindh region in action against the practice of Karo-Kari, establishing helplines and offices in the districts of Sukkur, Jacobabad, Larkana and Khairpur.

In 2012, the government revived the National Commission on the Status of Women established by General Musharraf for three years in 2000, later revived for three years at a time. The bill moved by government established the commission as a permanent body with the task to ensure the implementation of women protection legislation for abuses against women.

In February 2012, the Muttahida Qaumi Movement held the world's largest women's political rally in Karachi, with an estimated 100,000 women in attendance.

==== Criminal Law (Amendment) (Offense of Rape) Act 2016 ====
On 7 October 2016, Pakistan's parliament unanimously passed new anti-rape and anti-honor-killing bills. The new laws introduced harsher punishments for the perpetrators of such crimes. According to the new anti-rape bill, DNA testing was made mandatory in rape cases. Sabotaging or disrupting the work of a police officer or Government official could result in imprisonment of 1 year under the new law. Government officials who are found to take advantage of their official position to commit acts of rape (e.g. custodial rape) are liable to imprisonment for life and a fine. According to the new law, anyone who rapes a minor or a mentally or physically disabled person will be liable for the death penalty or life imprisonment.

The recording of statement of the female survivor of rape or sexual harassment shall be done by an Investigating Officer, in the presence of a female police officer, or a female family member of the survivor. Survivors of rape shall be provided legal aid (if needed) by the Provincial Bar Council. The new law also declares that trials for offences such as rape and related crimes shall be conducted in-camera and also allows for the use of technology such as video links to record statements of the victim and witnesses, to spare them the humiliation or risk entailed by court appearances. The media will also be restricted from publishing or publicizing the names or any information that would reveal the identity of a victim, except when publishing court judgements. The trial for rape shall conclude within three months. However, if the trial is not completed within three months, the case shall be brought to the notice of the Chief Justice of the High Court for appropriate directions. The new bill also ensures that sex workers are also included in the law's protection.

UN Women Executive Director, Phumzile Mlambo-Ngcuka, hailed the Government of Pakistan's decision to pass the anti-rape and anti-honor killing bills.

==== Special Courts ====
On 20 June 2019, Chief justice of Pakistan, Asif Saeed Khosa, announced that more than 1,000 special courts will be established in the country which will focus on tackling violence against women. Each district in Pakistan will have once such court according to the chief justice. Romana Bashir, who heads a NGO called the Peace and Development Foundation which is focused on women's rights in Pakistan, said that the establishment of such courts was "a wonderful safeguarding measure". She also said "Certainly women will be encouraged and feel strengthened to speak up against gender based violence. Consequently, women will be able to get justice". Fauzia Viqar, a women's rights campaigner who advised the Punjab government until last month, said studies had shown the performance of such dedicated courts to be "many times better than other courts".

== Timeline of Women Development/ Empowerment ==
- 1947: Women actively participated in the movement for independent Pakistan.
- 1949: All Pakistan Women's Association was formed.
- 1956: First Constitution of Pakistan grants equal rights to all citizens including women.
- Constitution of Pakistan of 1956 - Right to vote in National elections.
- 1965: Fatima Jinnah becomes the first woman to run for President.
- 1973: Constitution abolished discrimination on women. Safeguarding women with Article 25 reflecting Gender Equality.
- 1981: Women's Action Forum was formed to resist discriminatory laws against women including Hudood Ordinances
- 1985: Reserved quota for women increased.
- 1988: First female prime minister of Pakistan, Benazir Bhutto, Historical Milestone in Women Empowerment and Representation
- 1994: First Women Police Stations were introduced in Pakistan
- 2000: Legal and Political Reforms including reserved seats for women in local governments (2001) and in National and Provincial Assemblies (2003) Women in Pakistani politics, National Assembly of Pakistan
- 2006: Women's protection bill was passed.
- 2010: Protection Against Harassment of Women at the Workplace Act, 2010 passed as landmark achievement.
- 2011: Acid Control and Acid Crime Prevention Bill passed legal reforms for women in Pakistan
- 2016: Protection of Women against Violence Bill, 2015 was passed
- 2018: First Transgender Persons (Protection of Rights) Act, 2018 passed.
- 2018: MeToo movement in Pakistan gained momentum.
- 2019 to present: Aurat March movement
- 2021: Anti Rape Act passed Rape in Pakistan

== Controversial Practices ==
=== Purdah ===
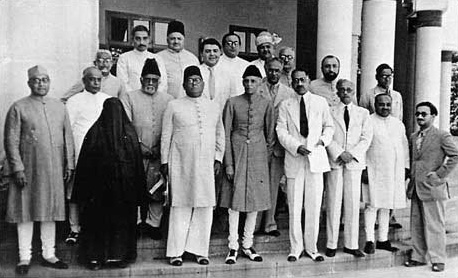
A meeting of the All-India Muslim League in Lahore in 1940 shows Amjadi Begum in a body length burqa.

Purdah norms are followed in few communities of Pakistan. It is practiced in various ways, depending on family tradition, region, class, and rural or urban residence. Purdah is most likely to be practiced among the Pashtuns and the Muslim Rajputs. Now, many women in Pakistan don't practice Purdah, which is opposed by many religious scholars. Generally, women living in more developed areas like Lahore, Karachi and Islamabad are more liberal in terms of dressing than women living in less developed areas.

=== Vani ===
Vani is a marriage custom followed in tribal areas and the Punjab province. The young girls are forcibly married off in order to resolve the feuds between different clans; the Vani can be avoided if the clan of the girl agrees to pay money, called Deet, to other clans. Swara, Pait likkhi and Addo Baddo are similar tribal and rural customs that often promote marriage of girls in their early teenage years. In one extreme case in 2012, a local Jirga in Aari village, Swat ordered that Roza Bibi, a girl of six, must be married off to settle a dispute between her family and the rival family. As of 2018, the trend of Vani is decreased very much, allowing more young girls to live their childhood freely.

=== Watta satta ===
Watta satta is a tribal custom in which brides are traded between two clans. In order to marry off a son, one must also have a daughter to marry off in return. If there is no sister to exchange in return for a son's spouse, a cousin, or a distant relative can also do. Even though Islamic law requires that both partners explicitly consent to marriage, women are often forced into marriages arranged by their fathers or tribal leaders. Watta satta is most common in rural parts of northwest and west Pakistan, and its tribal regions. Watta-Satta marriage in Pakistan provoke low, domestic violence and often exceed the cause and end up in Karo-Kari cases, especially in Sindh.

=== Dowry ===
Like in other parts of South Asia, the custom of dowry is practiced in Pakistan, and conflicts related to it often result in violence, even dowry deaths. At over 2000 dowry-related deaths per year, and annual rates exceeding 2.45 deaths per 100,000 women from dowry-related violence, Pakistan has the highest reported number of dowry death rates per 100,000 women in the world.

=== Violence against women ===
A 2020 Report by Aurat foundation on "Violence against women and girls in the time of Covid 19 pandemic" from identified 25 districts of Pakistan reported 2297 cases of domestic violence against women which included crimes like honor killings, murder, rape, suicide, acid burning, kidnapping; out of which 57% cases were reported from Punjab, 27% from Sindh.

In 1999, at least 1000 women were murdered in Pakistan and 90% of women reported being subject to domestic violence. Law enforcement authorities routinely dismiss domestic violence as private disputes. With domestic violence cases, it is important to acknowledge that marital rape is not considered a crime. Most women do not report the abuse they experience because they want to avoid ruining their family's reputation, they are scared the abuse will worsen, and they are afraid they would be separated from their husband and kids. For the women that do report abuse, they are often harassed by the police and their families; about 33% of women were a victim of physical abuse and did not make any reports. When it comes to marital abuse, pregnant women are even victims. In order to cope, some women enter religious communities or religious events to avoid being home and further altercations. Some ask for help from their friends and family, but most are reluctant to make formal complaints because they feel as if they would not be understood Pakistan Policemen stop activists during a rally to mark International Women's Day in Islamabad on 8 March. Women's demand equal rights for women in Pakistan. Pakistani law is even more inadequate in protecting women victims of domestic violence and penalizing batterers.

According to a survey conducted by Pulse Consultant, a staggering 35% of Pakistanis hold the belief that no woman is safe in the country. Additionally, 43% of respondents expressed the view that women are safe to some extent, while a mere 20% believe that women are truly safe in Pakistan. These findings shed light on the perceptions and concerns surrounding women's safety in the nation.

==== Rape ====
Some Police officers in Pakistan have in certain cases refused to record the complaint of women when an officer may have been involved. In 2006, President Pervez Musharraf passed the Protection of Women Act. The purpose of it was for women to be provided with relief and to be able to have protection under the Hudood Ordinance and back into the prosecution under the Pakistani Criminal code. The act recognized rape under five circumstances, against [a woman's] will, without [a women's] consent, with [a woman's] consent, when the consent has been obtained by putting a woman in fear or of hurt, with her consent, when the man knows that he is not married to her and that the consent is given because she believes that the man is another person to whom she is or believes herself to be married; or with or without her consent when she is under sixteen years of age. Because of the act, a person in Pakistan was punishable by either death or imprisoned up to 10 to 25 years. Although the act was passed, there were no significant effects in which investigations were done on rape victims.

On 17 April 2002, a woman by the name Zafran Bibi, who was 26 at the time, was sentenced to death by stoning in Pakistan. Zafran Bibi stepped forward as a rape victim in Pakistan. Bibi was recast as guilty for having sexual intercourse outside of valid marriage and was sentenced to death because of this incident. Bibi stated that she was tortured and raped by her brother-in-law, Jamal Khan. Her husband was in jail when the incident occurred. Human rights groups saw that Zafran Bibi sentence was bizarre and the actions that were taken towards her case were not taken in the matter that it should have been. The pressure of the Human Rights group ultimately led the court to overturn her sentence.

==== Honor killings (Karo-Kari) ====
A majority of the victims of honour killings are women and the punishments meted out to the murderers are very lenient.

In 2010, it was reported that more than 1,000 honour killing occur every year in Pakistan and India.

The practice of summary killing of a person suspected of an illicit liaison is known as karo kari in Sindh and Balochistan. In December 2004, the Government passed a bill that made karo kari punishable under the same penal provisions as murder. In 2016, Pakistan repealed the loophole which allowed the perpetrators of honour killings to avoid punishment by seeking forgiveness for the crime from another family member, and thus be legally pardoned. Many cases of honour killings have been reported against women who marry against their family's wishes, who seek divorce or who have been raped. In addition, women of lower classes are more prone to being victims of honour killings or rape.

==== Acid attacks ====
Acid attacks occur within the public sphere. Acid and kerosene are thrown at women, mostly in the direction of their faces, as a form of permanent punishment. Many women do not report these attacks out of fear of getting attacked again or to protect the groups of people committing the attacks. Hundreds of women are victims of these attacks and some die from their injuries. When these attacks are reported they are written off as mistakes or suicides at times. In order to help with these attacks, the Depilex Smileagain Foundation provides victims of acid attacks with the opportunity to undergo surgery to heal their faces with the help of experienced doctors, while receiving the medical services they need to recover.

Under the Qisas (eye-for-an-eye) law of Pakistan, the perpetrator could suffer the same fate as the victim, if the victim or the victim's guardian chooses. The perpetrator may be punished by having drops of acid placed in their eyes. Section 336B of Pakistan Penal Code states: "Whoever causes hurt by corrosive substance shall be punished with imprisonment for life or imprisonment of either description which shall not be less than fourteen years and a minimum fine of one million rupees." Additionally, section 299 defines Qisas and states: "Qisas means punishment by causing similar hurt at the same part of the body of the convict as he has caused to the victim or by causing his death if he has committed qatl-iamd (intentional manslaughter) in exercise of the right of the victim or a Wali (the guardian of the victim)."

=== Female infanticide ===
In Pakistan, abortion and infanticide is illegal and so is adultery. Premarital relations are strictly prohibited in the country and are frowned upon by society. According to media reports, the ratio of female infanticides is higher than male. People give more value to a baby boy than a baby girl. People are worried and scared about the finances required for her marriage because of the dowry practice. This whole scenario leads them to commit the hideous crime of infanticide. Three different research studies, according to Klausen and Wink, note that Pakistan had the world's highest percentage of missing girls, relative to its total pre-adult female population.

=== Marriage to the Quran ===
Being married to the Quran, traditionally called 'Haq Bakshish', is a practice in which a girl or young woman is either persuaded or compelled to forfeit her right to marry and instead devote her life to studying and memorizing the Quran. The practice is controversial throughout Pakistan, and the Council of Islamic Ideology has declared it to be "un-Islamic".

In some parts of Sindh, the practice of marrying a woman to the Quran is prevalent among landlords; it requires that the woman live without a husband throughout her life. Although it is without roots in Islamic tradition, the practice is often used by men to claim the land that would otherwise be inherited by their sisters and daughters upon marriage. The cultural logic of "Quran marriage" is not unique to the limited world of Muslims in South Asia. Similar arrangements, such as the "wedding" celebrated between a Catholic novice and Jesus Christ, are known from other regions and religions. Whereas marriage to the Quran is disapproved by "textual Islam," the regionally "practiced Islam" may even add a religious coverage.

The Council of Islamic Ideology (CII) has unanimously approved a draft bill aimed at eliminating the inhuman customs of marrying a woman to the Quran and "Haq Bakhshwan" The council in its 157th meeting recommended to the government to award life imprisonment to those who married their sisters and daughters to the Quran. The draft bill, to be called Pakistan Penal Code (Amendment Act) 2005, seeks to abolish the un-Islamic custom of such marriages. Marriage to the holy book is a common custom in Sindh, especially among the feudal lords to avoid transfer of property out of family hands at the time of marriage of their daughter or sister. The council has declared that this practice amounts to defiling the Quran, desecrating the Islamic institution of marriage and denying a woman of inheritance as well as her right to choose a life partner.

=== Cousin marriages ===
According to Prof Huma Arshad Cheema (HOD Department of Pediatric Gastroenterology of the Children's Hospital, Lahore), 50 per cent of infant mortality in Pakistan is attributed to Inherited Metabolic Disorders besides inherited or genetic diseases affecting liver, heart, kidney and brain in children. As per Dr Areeba Farrukh, a Pediatric Resident at National Institute of Child Health (NICH), Karachi, cousin marriages are also an important reason for diseases like thalassemia and faulty haemoglobin build-up, which can eventually lead to iron deficiency and anaemia.

According to joint research study conducted in 2016–2017 by scholars of Department of Biological Science Gomal University, and Institute of Biotechnology and Genetic Engineering University of Agriculture Peshawar; high rate of consanguinity in Pakistan does contribute to hereditary hearing loss and to minimize such risks genetic counselling is required. Many girls groomed and pressured to accept cousin marriages to keep familial feudal properties and relations intact, in process kids do suffer various kind of genetic disabilities on account of traditions of cousin marriages. According to Sadia Saeed deformed 'A DCY3' mutations lead to slow learning and from mild to moderate intellectual disabilities, loss of sense of smell to gaining obesity with more likelihood of diabetes in here in life. 'MARK3' mutation may leads to progressive Phthisis bulbi (shrinkage of the eyeball). Mutation IQSEC1 can be a cause of intellectual disability, developmental delays, short stature, speech loss, low muscle tone and, in some cases, seizures and aggressive behaviour.

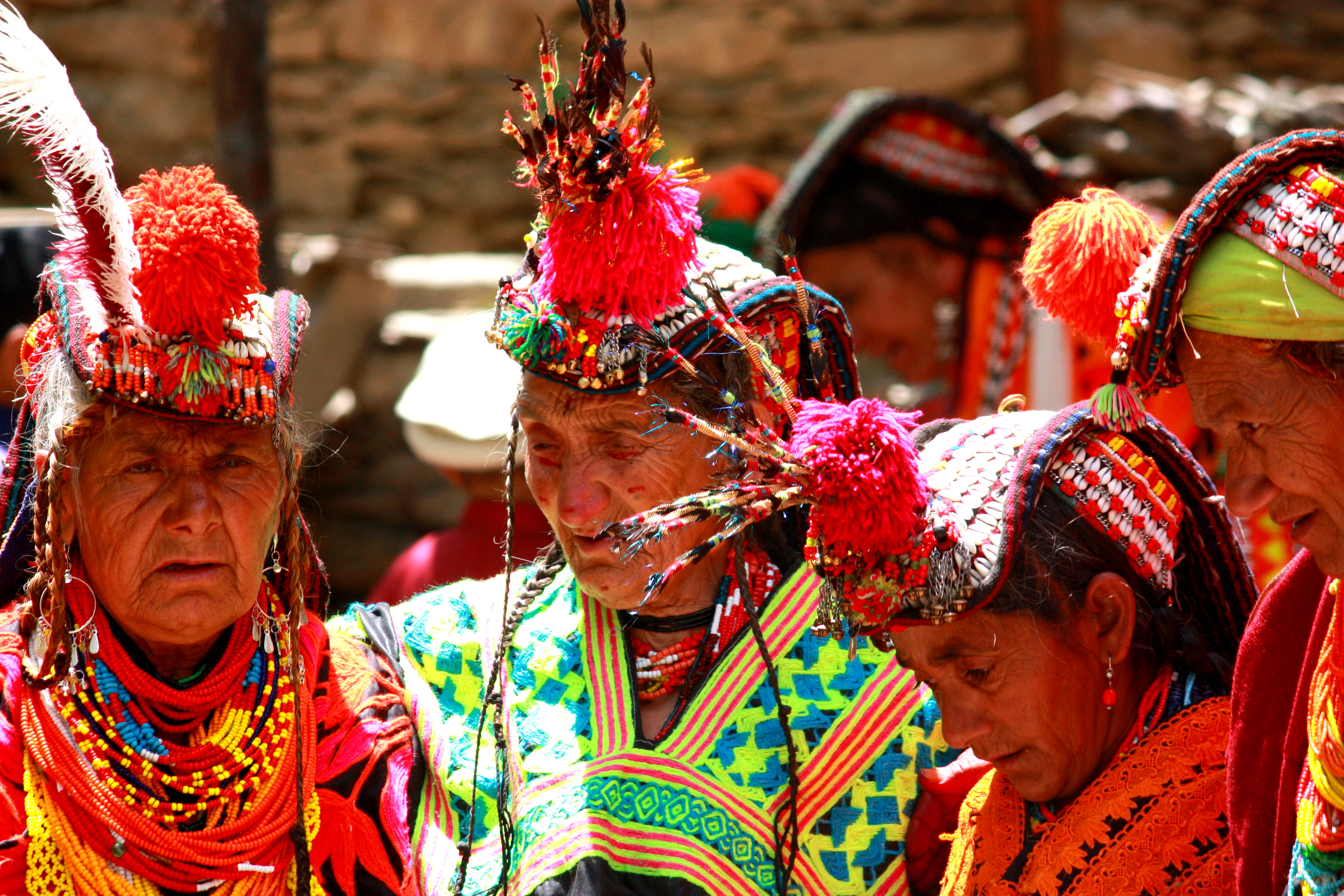
Traditional Women Dress in Kalash

== Culture ==
=== Dress ===
Pakistani dresses are popular around the world for their variety of fabrics, embroidery, colors and use of patterns. These dresses not only reflect the variety of weathers this region has but also represent more than hundred ethnicities living across the country. Women in Pakistan wear dresses of comfort and beauty from ordinary days to festivals, each occasion has its own defined dress codes. These specific dress patterns identify each ethnicity and community visibly.

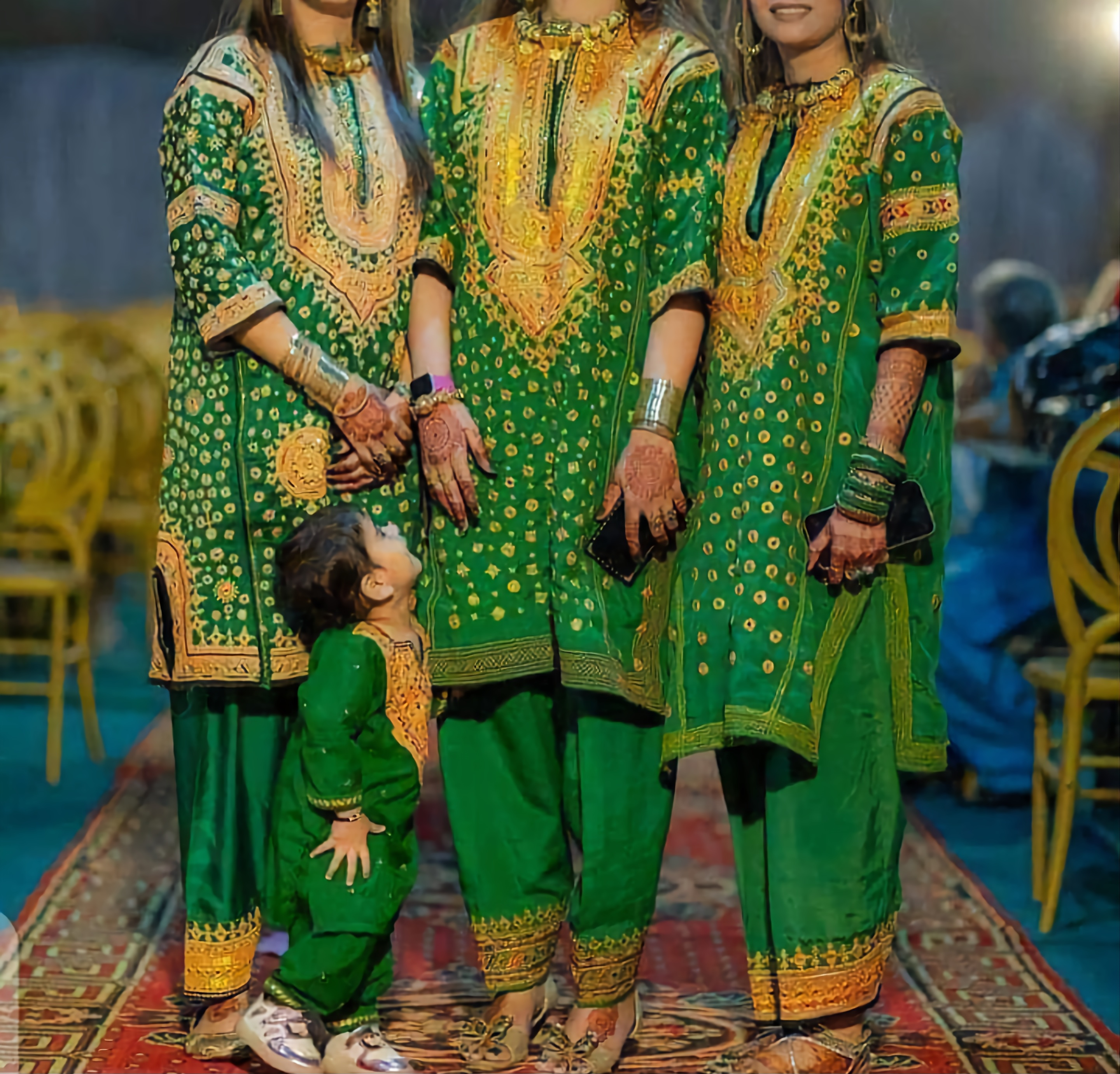
Women Festive Dress - Shalwar Kameez

Evidently, the purdah for Muslim upper- and middle-class women in India and later Pakistan, both in the form of gender segregation as well as the veil, fell out of fashion due to women's active mobilization in the anticolonial struggle for independence. The anti-colonial independence movement in the Muslim world was dominated by secular modernists, who considered women's liberation as a natural part of a modernized and revitalized Muslim world, and by the 1930s, Muslim upper-class women had started to appear unveiled.

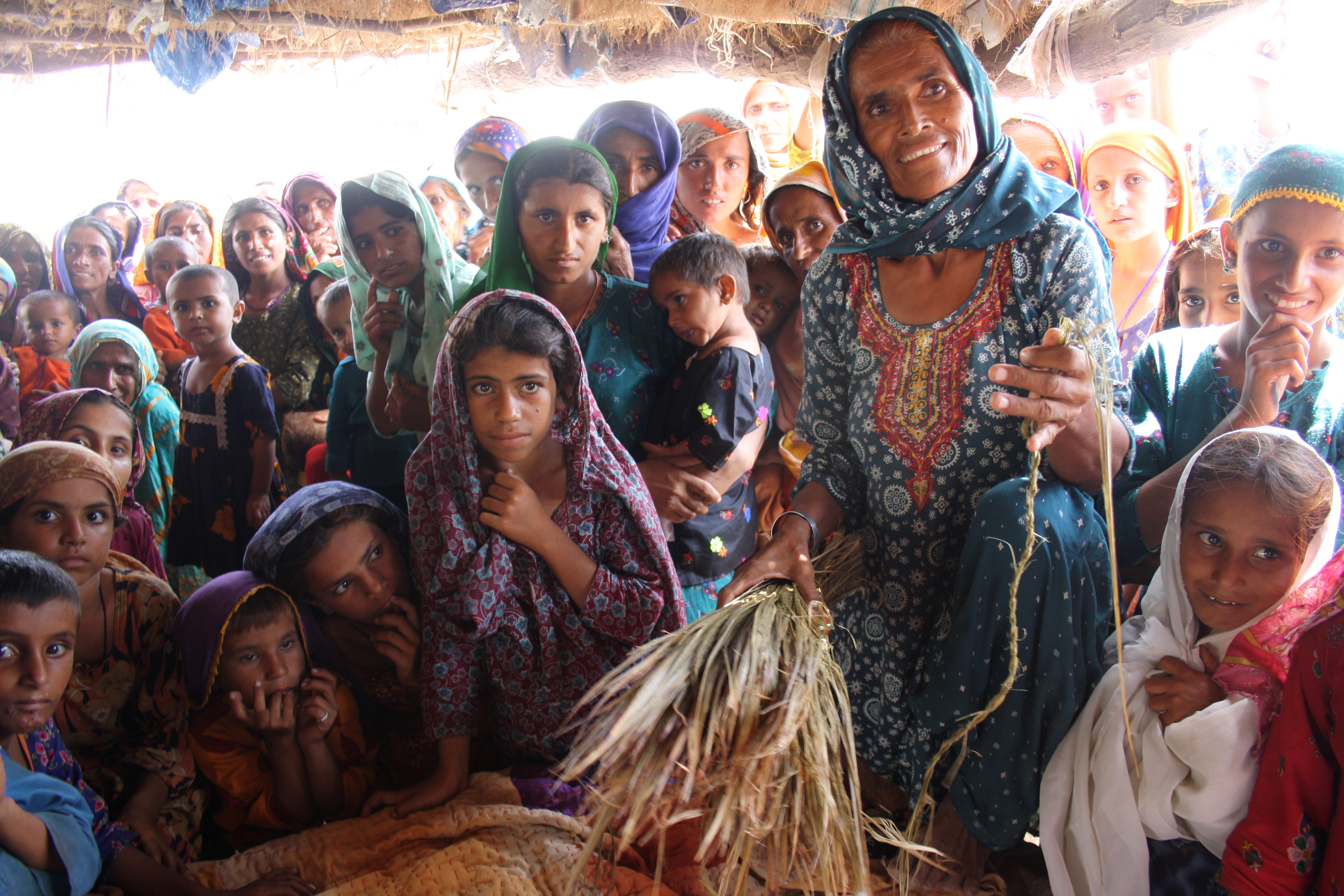
Women and girls in Shadadkot, north-west Sindh, Pakistan.

During the Islamization policy of Muhammad Zia-ul-Haq in 1977–1988, women were directed to veil, and although no law of general compulsory veiling was introduced, women who appeared on state Television as well as women employed by the Federal Government were forced to veil. These regulations were repealed after the fall of Zia-ul-Haq.

The most common female dress is the shalwar kameez with a shawl called dupatta. The shawl is draped over the shoulders and sometimes over the head, usually for prayer. Most women wear very baggy trousers however more westernised girls have made it less baggy and tight. Upper and middle-class women in towns wear burqas over their normal clothes in public.

The burqa is the traditional way of pardah in Pakistan. It is typically a tent-like garment worn over the ordinary clothes and is made of cotton or breathable materials. Many middle-class women wear a two-piece burqa which is usually black in colour but sometimes navy blue or dark red. It consists of a long cloak and a separate headpiece with a drop-down face veil. Some educated urban women no longer wear the burqa. The burqa is also not worn by rural peasant women who work in the fields. In rural areas only women wear burqas or shawls are from landlord/elite families.

=== Handmade Embroidery ===
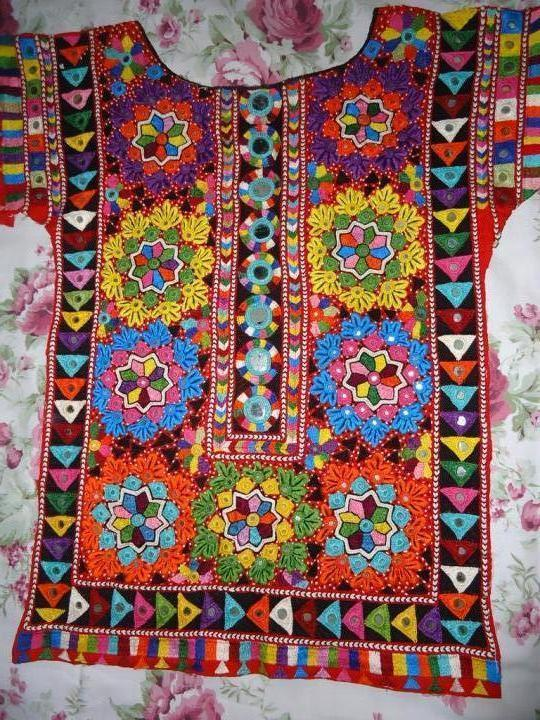
Hand Made Embroidery Shirt Front

In Pakistan, handmade embroidery is traditionally a respected woman-made craft. These designs often incorporate motifs inspired by local folklore, nature, and spiritual symbolism, preserving a rich tapestry of cultural identity through thread and fabric.

Some women pursue embroidery as an art form and a livelihood. Some also work with NGOs and artisan collectives that connect them to national and international buyers, increasing their financial independence and visibility in public spheres.

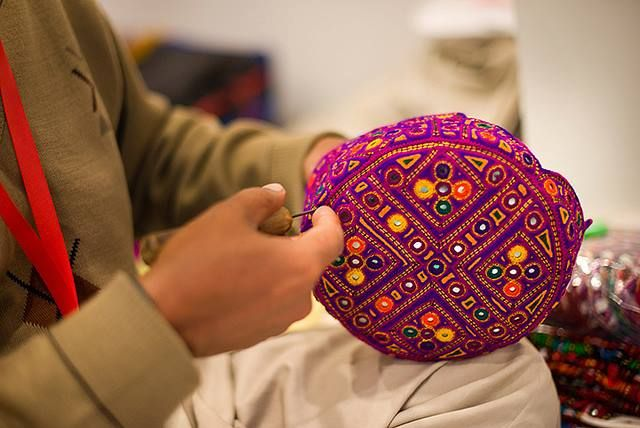
Handmade Traditional Cap

This work empowers women in multiple ways. Economically, it helps them support their families and access basic needs. Socially, it creates spaces for women to organize, share knowledge, and collectively advocate for their rights. Culturally, their embroidery sustains indigenous practices that might otherwise be lost in the tide of modernization.

Despite limited access to formal education or resources, these women continue to uphold and innovate within this traditional craft, blending old techniques with new designs to appeal to contemporary audiences.

=== Mobility ===
In an effort to address women's mobility issues and promote safe scooty riding, the Islamabad Traffic Police on 17 February 2026 opened the Uraan Scooty and MotorRiding School. Inspector General (IG) Police Islamabad Syed Ali Nasir Rizvi was the main guest at the ceremony. Speaking at the event, the IG said that the Uraan program represents self-assurance and independence in addition to providing women with structured driving training in cars, motorbikes, and scooters. He added that the ITP Uraan program is a practical attempt to support women's aspirations and a major step toward guaranteeing safe and independent movement for women. The IGP Islamabad emphasized that this endeavour is a significant step forward for women's safe and unrestricted travel. The entire training program at "ITP Uraan Scooty and Motor Riding School" complies with international standards. The school has facilities specifically designed for hands-on teaching as well as a contemporary driving track.

== Education and economic development ==
In Pakistan, the women's access to property, education, employment etc. remains considerably lower compared to men. The social and cultural context of Pakistani society has historically been predominantly patriarchal. Women have a low percentage of participation in society outside of the family. As per research study of Khurshid, Gillani, Hashmi; Pakistani school textbooks are discriminatory towards female representation in quantity and status. History taught in Pakistani school text books is mostly male oriented, in Urdu school books women religious role too is less depicted, women get depicted in inferior position compared to men.

=== Education ===
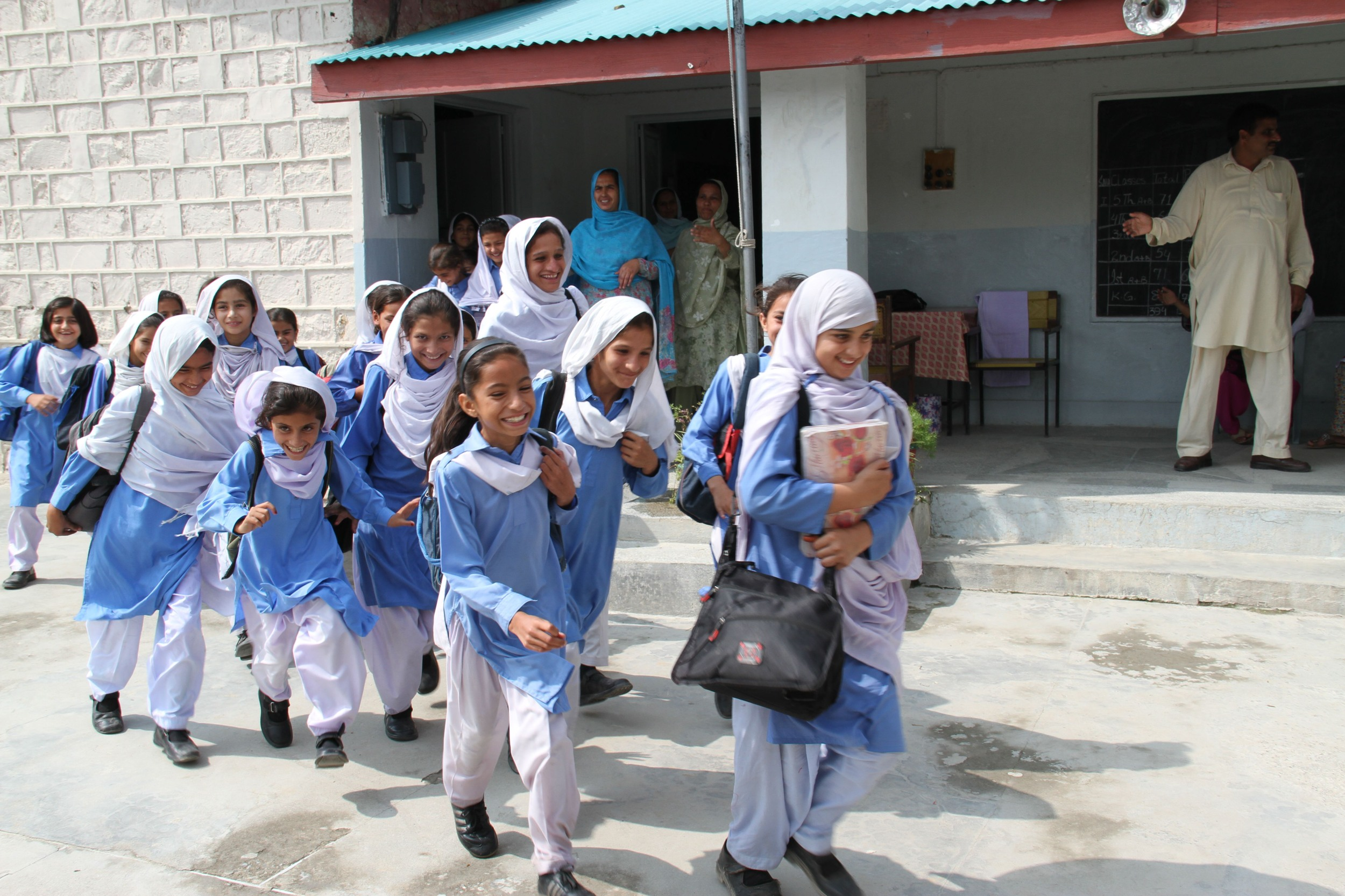
School girls wearing Shalwar Kameez, in Abbottabad.

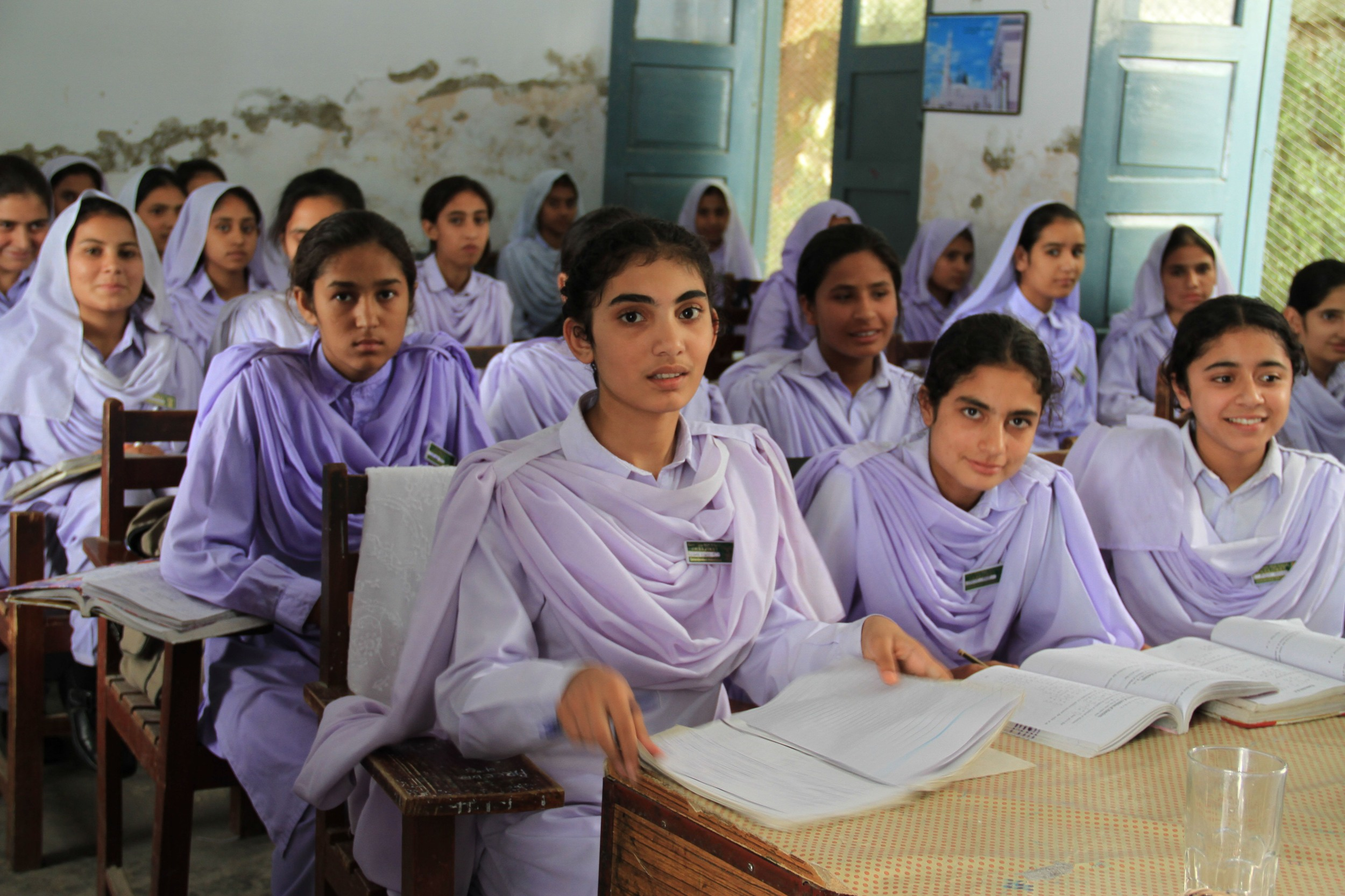
Pakistani school girls in Khyber Pakhtunkhwa

Despite the improvement in Pakistan's literacy rate since its independence, the educational status of Pakistani women is among the lowest in the world. The literacy rate for urban women is more than five times the rate for rural women. The literacy rate is still lower for women compared to men: the literacy rate is 52% for females, while for males it is 68% (as of 2024). Punjab has the highest literacy rate for females while Balochistan has the lowest, which indicates that the geographic factors strongly affect educational opportunities for females. Pakistan Institute for Peace Studies (2024) also reports that as the level of education increases, the likelihood of females dropping out or not continuing their education also increases.

At the end of the 20th century, the school drop-out rate among girls was very high (almost 50 percent), even though the educational achievements of female students were higher than male students at different levels of education. Since then, education for women has improved rapidly. In Lahore there are 46 public colleges out of which 26 are female colleges and some of the others are co-educational. Similarly the public universities of Pakistan have female enrollment than male.

UNESCO and the Orascom subsidiary of Pakistan telco, Mobilink have been using mobile phones to educate women and improve their literacy skills since 4 July 2010. The local BUNYAD Foundation of Lahore and the UN's work via the Dakar Framework of Action for EFA are also helping with this issue. As of 2010, the literacy rate of females in Pakistan was at 39.6 percent compared to that of males at 67.7 percent. More recent statistics provided by the UNICEF – shows that female education amongst 15- to 24-year-olds has increased substantially to 61.5% – an increase of 45%. Male education is at a steady rate of 71.2%.

Many policies in Pakistan aim to achieve equality in education between girls and boys and to reduce the gender gap in the educational system. However, the policy also encourages girls, mainly in rural areas of Pakistan, to acquire basic home management skills, which are preferred over full-scale primary education. The attitudes towards women in Pakistani culture make the fight for educational equality more difficult. The lack of democracy and feudal practices of Pakistan also contribute to the gender gap in the educational system.

In rural areas, girls' schools are far away from their homes; many families cannot afford travel expenses for their children. Girls live in fear due to extremist policies. In Khyber Pakhtunkhwa, militant groups have bombed girls' schools and pressured several governments to make women's education less attainable through threats.

In some regions, women are severely bound by cultural constraints and prejudices, as they are often involved in domestic work for over 14 hours per day. In Balochistan, for example, female literacy rate stands between 15 and 25%.

This system leaves the underpowered, women in particular, in a very vulnerable position. The long-lived socio-cultural belief that women play a reproductive role within the confines of the home leads to the belief that educating women holds no value. Although the government declared that all children of ages 5–16 can go to school, there are 7.261 million children out of school at the primary level in Pakistan, and 58% are female (UNESCO, Education for All Global Monitoring Report 2011). Although girls have the right to get an education legally, in many rural regions of Pakistan girls are strongly discouraged from going to school and discriminated against, as there are violent acts such as acid throwing which many girls fall victim to for attending school.

=== Rural/urban divide and government policy ===
Females are educated equally like Males in urban areas such as Lahore, Islamabad and Karachi. However, in rural areas, the education rate is substantially lower. This has begun to change with the issuance of government policy, in which 70% of new schools are built for girls, and also plans to increase the size of women's school so that the infrastructure matches those of men's schools and more female colleges have also been established in order to provide women with higher education.

Women in elite urban districts of Pakistan enjoy a far more privileged lifestyle than those living in rural tribal areas. Women in urbanized districts typically lead more elite lifestyles and have more opportunities for education. Rural and tribal areas of Pakistan have an increasingly high rate of poverty and alarmingly low literacy rates. In 2002 it was recorded that 81.5% of 15- to 19-year-old girls from high-income families had attended school while 22.3% of girls from low-income families had ever attended school.

In comparison, it was recorded that 96.6 percent of Pakistani boys ages 15–19 coming from high-income families had attended schooling while 66.1 percent of 15- to 19-year-old boys from low-income families had attended school. Girls living in rural areas are encouraged not to go to school because they are needed in the home to do work at a young age. In most rural villages, secondary schooling simply does not exist for girls, leaving them no choice but to prepare for marriage and do household tasks. These rural areas often have inadequate funding and schooling for girls is at the bottom of their priorities.

=== Employment ===
Pakistan is a largely rural society (almost two-thirds of the population lives in rural areas) and women are rarely formally employed. This does not mean that women do not participate in the economy: quite on the contrary, women usually work on the farm of the household, practise subsistence agriculture, or otherwise work within the household economic unit. However, women are often prevented from advancing economically, due to social restrictions on women's movement and gender mixing, as well as due to low education.

==== Workforce participation ====
Although women play an active role in Pakistan's economy, their contribution has been grossly underreported in some censuses and surveys. Part of the underestimation of women's economic role is that Pakistan, like many other countries, has a very large informal sector. The 1991–92 Labour Force Survey revealed that only about 16% of women aged 10 years and over were in the labour force. According to World Bank, in 2014, women made up 22.3% of the labour force in Pakistan.

According to the 1999 report by the Human Rights Commission of Pakistan, only two percent of Pakistani women participate in the formal sector of employment. However, the 1980 agricultural census stated that the women's participation rate in agriculture was 73%. The 1990–1991 Pakistan Integrated Household Survey indicated that the female labour force participation rate was 45% in rural areas and 17% the urban areas. Pakistani women play a major role in agricultural production, livestock raising and cottage industries.

In 2008, it was recorded that 21.8 percent of females were participating in the labour force in Pakistan while 82.7 percent of men were involved in labour. The rate of women in the labour force has an annual growth rate of 6.5 percent. Out of the 47 million employed peoples in Pakistan in 2008, only 9 million were women and of those 9 million, 70 percent worked in the agricultural sector. The income of Pakistani women in the labour force is generally lower than that of men, due in part to a lack of formal education. In Pakistan, women are not accepted if they earn more than their husbands - development organization CARE found 76% of respondents felt that people, particularly family members, will disapprove if female entrepreneurs' earnings usurp their partners'.

The low female literacy rate is a large obstacle in women taking part in the workforce.

Due to the religious and cultural values in Pakistan, women who do try to enter the workforce are often pushed into the lower of the three employment structures. This structure level, unorganized services sector, has low pay, low job security and low productivity. In order to improve this situation, governmental organizations and political parties need to push for the entrance of women into the organized services sector. Conservative interpretations of Islam have not promoted women's rights in the workforce, since they value women as keepers of the family honor, support gender segregation, and institutionalization of gender disparities.

Furthermore, women who do work are often paid less than minimum wage, because they are seen as lesser beings in comparison to men, and "their working conditions vis-à-vis females are often hazardous; having long working hours, no medical benefits, no job security, subjected to job discrimination, verbal abuse and sexual harassment and no support from male-oriented labor unions" (An In-Depth Analysis of Women's Labor Force Participation in Pakistan).

Although these religious and cultural barriers exist keeping women away from the workforce, studies have shown that women-only entrepreneurial training that allows participants to develop capital and competences, can break these down. Programs such as this can go a long way in an Islamic socio-cultural context to develop tolerance and understanding.

==== Military ====
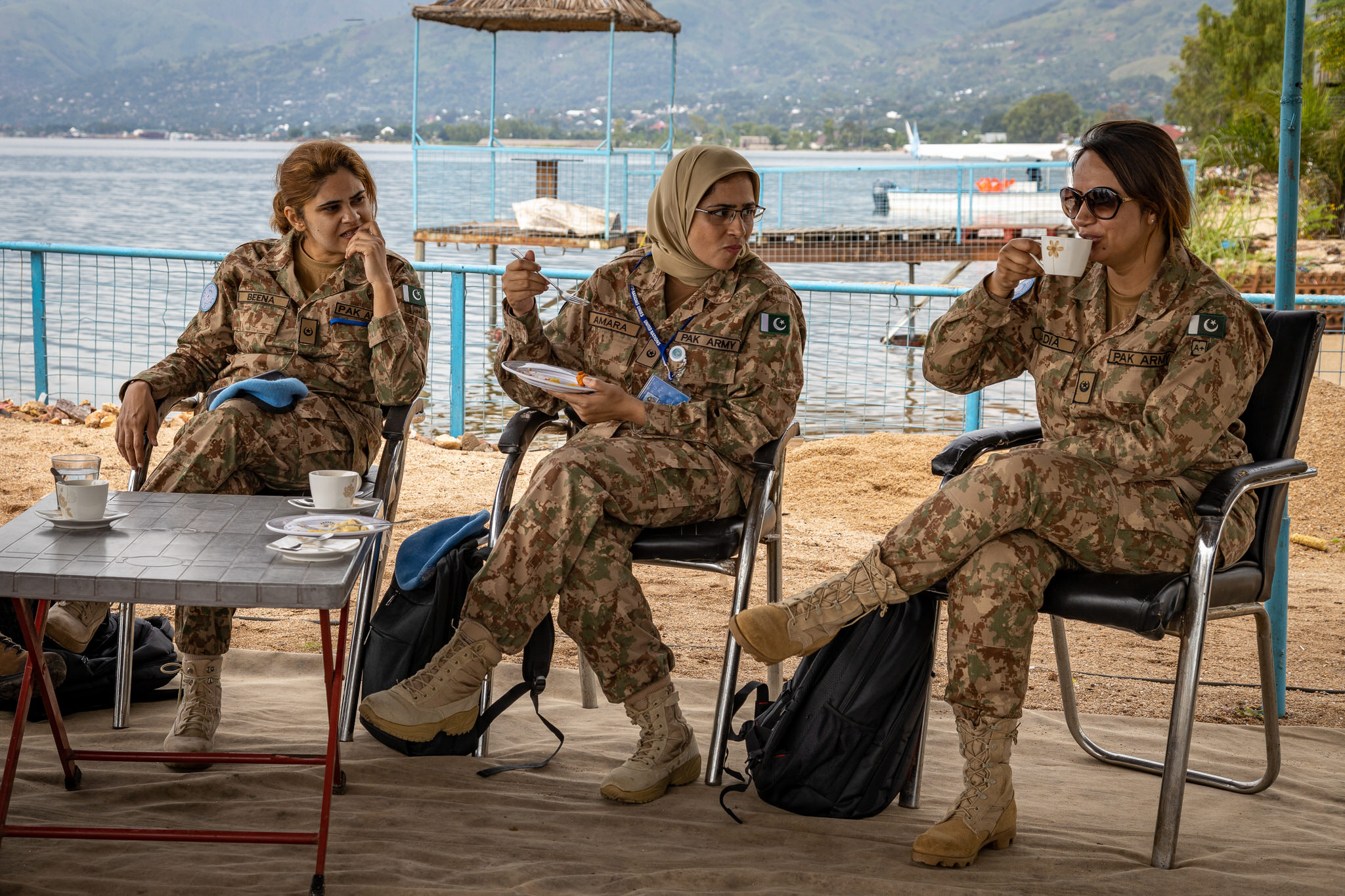
Female officers of the Pakistan Army during their deployment in Congo.

Women can serve in the Pakistan Armed Forces. In 2006, the first women fighter pilot batch joined the combat aerial mission command of PAF. The Pakistan Navy prohibits women from serving in the combat branch. Rather they are appointed and serve in operations involving military logistics, staff and senior administrative offices, particularly in the regional and central headquarters. About 4,000 women had served in the armed forces till 2017.

=== Land and property rights ===
Around 90% of the Pakistani households are headed by men and most female-headed households belong to the poor strata of the society.

Women lack ownership of productive resources. Despite women's legal rights to own and inherit property from their families, in 2000 there were very few women who had access and control over these resources.

== Other concerns ==
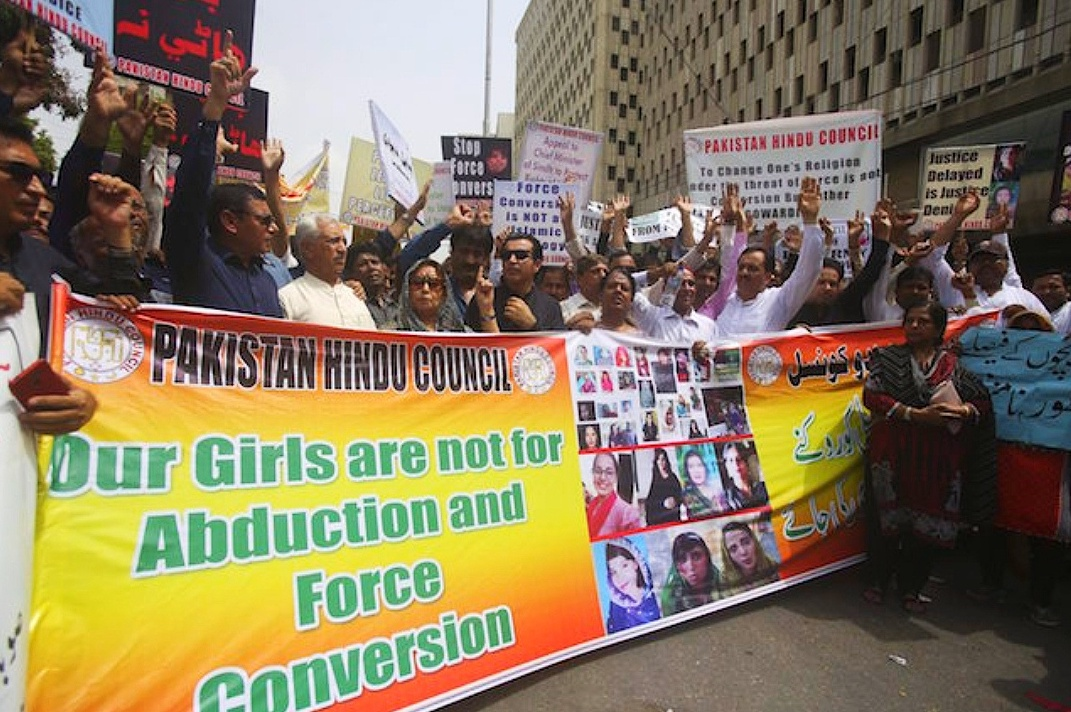
Protest against forced conversion of Hindu girls conducted by Pakistan Hindu Council

=== Gender roles ===
Pakistan is a patriarchal society where men are the primary authority figures and women are subordinate. Gender is one of the organizing principles of Pakistani society. Patriarchal values embedded in local traditions, religion and culture predetermine the social value of gender. Islam heavily influences gender roles in particular. An artificial divide between production and reproduction, made by the ideology of sexual division of labour, has placed women in reproductive roles as mothers and wives in the private arena of home and men in a productive role as breadwinners in the public arena.

Pakistani women lack social value and status because of negation of their roles as producers and providers in all social roles. The preference for sons due to their productive role often dictates the allocation of household resources in their favour. Traditionally, male members of the family are given better education and are equipped with skills to compete for resources in the public arena, while female members are imparted domestic skills to be good mothers and wives. Lack of skills, limited opportunities in the job market, and social, religious and cultural restrictions limit women's chances to compete for resources in the public arena.

This situation has led to the social and economic dependency of women that becomes the basis for male power over women in all social relationships. However, the spread of patriarchy is not even. The nature and degree of women's subordination vary across classes, regions, and the rural/urban divide. Patriarchal structures are relatively stronger in the rural and tribal setting where local customs establish male authority and power over women's lives. On the other hand, women belonging to the upper and middle classes have increasingly greater access to education and employment opportunities and can assume greater control over their lives.

According to Pakistani standards, 'good women' could be either educated or uneducated and are expected to be unselfish, calm, tolerant, empathetic, reliable, able to organize, compromise, coordinate and maintain hospitality within the house and in keeping good relationships. They are also expected to do household chores, care for her children, husband and in-laws and, when needed, provide the home with external income. Women are also expected to marry a man of their parent's choice, follow Islam's code of dress and sacrifice their own dreams.

In a study carried out by Gallup Pakistan, the Pakistani affiliate of Gallup International, majority of the Pakistanis believe that both males and females have different roles to play in the society. In Pakistan, for married women it is predominantly the husband's mother and his sisters who load pressure onto women to be at home taking care of the children and the household, and for the man to be the main breadwinner. Although women's role has broadened beyond being a housewife over time, many people still give priority to men in politics, education, employment, and related walks of life. When the respondents were asked to give their opinion on a number of statements about gender roles 63% of the respondents agreed with the statement that "Boys' education is more important than girls'"; 37% disagreed with it. The percentage of people agreeing with this statement was higher among rurallites (67%) as compared to the urbanites (53%). However, more than 90% believe that female children should be educated, nearly half of them believing that, should opportunity be available, they should rise to college education and beyond.

Fifty five percent (55%) of the respondents believe that "Both husband and wife should work"; while 45% said it is wrong for both husband and the wife to work. More than 50% of men including those from rural areas agree that both husband and wife should work for a better living. When the respondents were asked whether "Men are better politicians as compared to women or not"; 67% agree men are better politicians while 33% think otherwise. More women agree with this statement as compared to men. In response to the following statement "If jobs are in shortage should men be given priority for employment"; 72% of the respondents believe they should be given priority while 28% disagree. Eighty three percent (83%) of the respondents think that "To live a happy life women need children"; while only 17% think they do not. A vast majority of all respondents including 82% of women respondents believe that "prosperous women should raise their voice to support the rights of poor women."

=== Health ===
According to 1998 figures, the female infant mortality rate was higher than that of male children. The maternal mortality rate was also high, as only 20 percent of women were assisted by a trained provider during delivery. Only 9 percent of women used contraceptives in 1985, but by 2000 this figure had increased substantially, and as of 2012/13, the contraceptive prevalence rate was 35.4%. The total fertility rate is 2.75 children born/woman (2015 est.).

Pakistan has taken certain initiatives in the health sector to redress gender imbalances. The SAP was launched in 1992–1993 to accelerate improvement in the social indicators. Closing the gender gap is the foremost objective of the SAP. The other major initiative is the Prime Minister's program of lady health workers (LHWs). Under this community-based program, 26,584 LHWs in rural areas and 11,967 LHWs in urban areas have been recruited to provide basic health care including family planning to women at the grassroots level. Other initiatives include the village-based family planning workers and extended immunisation programs, nutritional and child survival, cancer treatment, and increased involvement of media in health education.

=== Marriage and divorce issues ===
The average age of women for marriage increased from 16.9 years in 1951 to 22.5 years in 2005. A majority of women are married to their close relatives, i.e., first and second cousins. Only 37 percent of married women are not related to their spouses before marriage. A study published in 2000 recorded that the divorce rate in Pakistan was extremely low due to the social stigma attached to it.

Many girls are still married off into a child marriage, and many complications with this can occur as childbirth from a child can cause complications with the baby and mother. A common system in place with marriage is the Dowry system in which a low or no status is assigned to a girl right from the prenatal stage. There are issues around the dowry system such as dowry related violence, in which the wife is abused by her husband. Before the marriage, the groom will make heavy financial demands on the bride's family as a condition of marrying their daughter.

In order for many parents' daughters to get married, they start "obtaining loans from people, getting interest based loans from banks, utilizing their life savings and even sell their homes" (JAHEZ (Dowry Conditions Set by the Groom for Marriage)). Within the dowry system, abuse is likely to occur after the marriage has taken place. Prior to the marriage, if certain conditions that the groom and his family have put in place are not met, they will threaten to break off the marriage, which would be devastating for the bride and her family because of the lengths the bride's family already had to go through to pay her dowry and because traditionally it is a great dishonor to the family.

== Women Role Models ==
Women in Pakistan participate in various professional sectors, including politics, education, the economy, healthcare and public service. Their involvement across these fields has contributed to shifts in the country's social standards and traditional norms. Historically, Pakistani women have moved into diverse roles within both the public and private spheres, increasingly gaining representation in high-level leadership and specialized service sectors.

=== Politics and activism ===
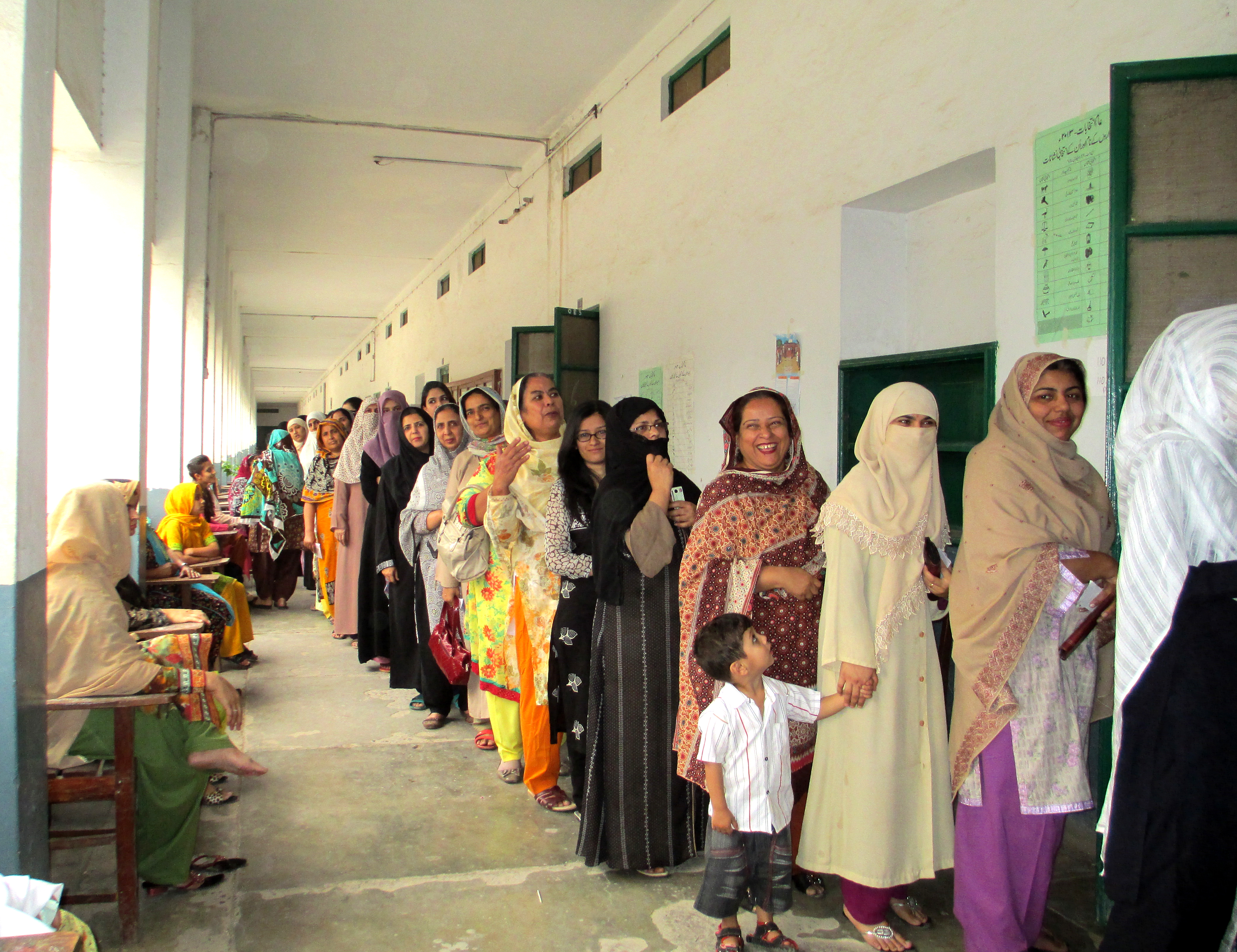
Women from Rawalpindi queued for their chance to vote in 2013 Pakistani general elections.

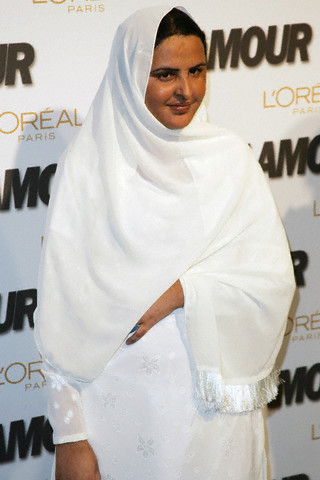
Mukhtār Mā'ī, a survivor of a gang rape as a form of honour revenge. She is one of Pakistan's most prominent women's rights activists.

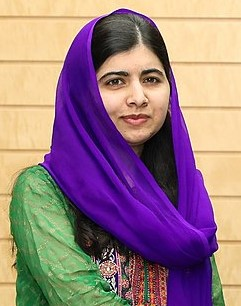
Malala Yousafzai, an activist, working for rights to education for children in Pakistan. She is the youngest Nobel Prize recipient ever.

In 2000, women's presence in political parties as well as in the political structure at the local, provincial, and national levels was insignificant due to cultural and structural barriers.The situation gradually improved, and by 2014, 20.7% of elected representatives were female, a statistic well ahead of the United States and less than 2% behind the United Kingdom. According to Foqia Sadiq Khan while Pakistan is in one of seventy countries where at least one woman President or Prime Minister had been there; lately Pakistan also provides for certain electoral reservations for women at local and parliamentary level like five percent of candidates need to be women, but still Pakistan lags behind in gender equality, and satisfactory political inclusion.

Foqia says while the highest number of women contested the 2018 general elections, still fewer, i.e. just eight, got elected compared to previous years. Foqia says that while electoral reservations provide for minimum level assurance, Pakistani familial, societal and institutional structure do little to give women a fair chance to thrive in competitive political environments. According to Foqia, though local level elections give more opportunities at entry level, being non-political in character means that political exposure remains limited; political parties do allot five percent of their parliamentary seats, but mostly where chances of winning are bleak; and the parliamentary reserved seats for women are awarded based on clientelism. This results in no benefit of exposure in a competitive political environment and the patriarchal hegemony continues to stifle meaningful political inclusion of women in Pakistan's political power structures. Prominent actress Sarah Khan states that Allah provides for equal gender rank for women and that instead of women's day's Aurat March activism, women need to focus on their children's education.

Miss Fatima Jinnah, sister of Mohammed Ali Jinnah, was an instrumental figure in the Pakistan movement. In 1947, she formed the Women's Relief Committee, which later formed the nucleus for the All Pakistan Women's Association (APWA). She was the first Muslim woman to contest the presidency in 1965, as a candidate of the Combined Opposition Party.

Begum Shaista Ikramullah was the first woman elected member of the Constituent Assembly of Pakistan.

Begum Sarwat Imtiaz was the first female lambardar in West Pakistan.

Begum Mahmooda Salim Khan was Pakistan's first woman minister and member of the Cabinet of President General Ayub Khan.

Begum Ra'ana Liaquat Ali Khan (1905–1990) was a women's rights activists. She was the founder of the All Pakistan Women's Association. Begum Nusrat Bhutto wife of Prime Minister Zulfikhar Ali Bhutto, led the Pakistani delegation to the United Nations' first women's conference in 1975.

Benazir Bhutto was the first female Prime Minister of Pakistan (1988)(1991) and the first woman elected to head a Muslim country. She was elected twice to the office of Prime Minister.

Fehmida Mirza is the first female speaker of the National Assembly of Pakistan. Other prominent female Pakistani politicians include Begum Nasim Wali Khan, Syeda Abida Hussain, Sherry Rehman and Tehmina Daultana.

Hina Rabbani Khar became the first Minister of Foreign Affairs of Pakistan in 2011.

Mukhtaran Mai a victim of gang rape has become a prominent activist for women's rights in Pakistan.

Asma Jahangir and Hina Jilani, prominent human rights lawyers and founders of the first all woman law firm in Pakistan, AGHS.

Malala Yousafzai, as a teenage education activist, was shot in the face in her hometown Mingora at the age of 15. After her hospitalisation and recovery she went on to win the Nobel Peace Prize in conjunction with Kailash Satyarthi for their work for children's rights. At 17, Yousafzai became the youngest recipient of the Nobel Peace Prize and the first Nobel Peace Prize winner from Pakistan.

Sania Nishtar, the first female cardiologist and the only woman Interim Cabinet Member 2013, is globally recognized for her work and accomplishments in health policy advocacy.

Nigar Ahmad, women's rights activist, co-founder of Aurat (women's) Foundation, one of the oldest women's organisation in the country.

Kanwal Ahmed is the founder of Soul Sisters Pakistan (SSP), a forum for those who identify as women and have roots in Pakistan. SSP, founded in 2013, was one of the few forums exclusively created for women to speak freely about issues particular to their identities. Ahmed also launched a flagship YouTube show called "Conversations with Kanwal. The show has brought different guests and it covers subjects like dwarfism, diabetes, postpartum depression, single fatherhood, bereavement, women in sports, chai trolley culture or colourism. Ahmed has garnered international recognition through her work on SSP and has become a figure in advocating for the need of women only spaces.

Naela Chohan is a Pakistani diplomat and feminist artist. She is currently serving as the Ambassador of Pakistan to Argentina, Uruguay, Peru and Ecuador. She has been a vocal proponent of stronger ties between Pakistan and Latin America.

Farida Shaheed and Khawar Mumtaz, human rights activists and authors, associated with Shirkat Gah, a woman's organisation.

Shahla Zia, human rights activist and lawyer, co-founder of AGHS with Asma Jahngir and Hina Jilani, and also co-founder of Aurat Foundation with Nigar Ahmad. Also the plaintiff in Shahla Zia v. WAPDA, the leading case on environmental law in Pakistan.

Tahira Abdullah, prominent human rights activist, associated with Women's Action Forum (WAF) and the Human Rights Commission of Pakistan (HRCP) and was a prominent member of the Lawyers Movement.

Fatima Lodhi is an activist, who is Pakistan's first anti-colourism and diversity advocate.

Riffat Arif, also known as Sister Zeph, is a teacher, women's activist and philanthropist from Gujranwala.

Romana Bashir, Catholic woman activist since 1997 in interfaith harmony and women's education.

Syeda Tahira Safdar, is the first woman chief justice of any high court in Pakistan. In 2018, she was sworn in as the 18th chief justice of the Balochistan High Court (BHC). Previously in 1982, she was also first woman to be appointed as civil judge in Quetta, Balochistan.

Ayesha Malik, is the senior judge from Lahore High Court (LHC). In 2021, she was also nominated for the post of Chief Justice of Pakistan.

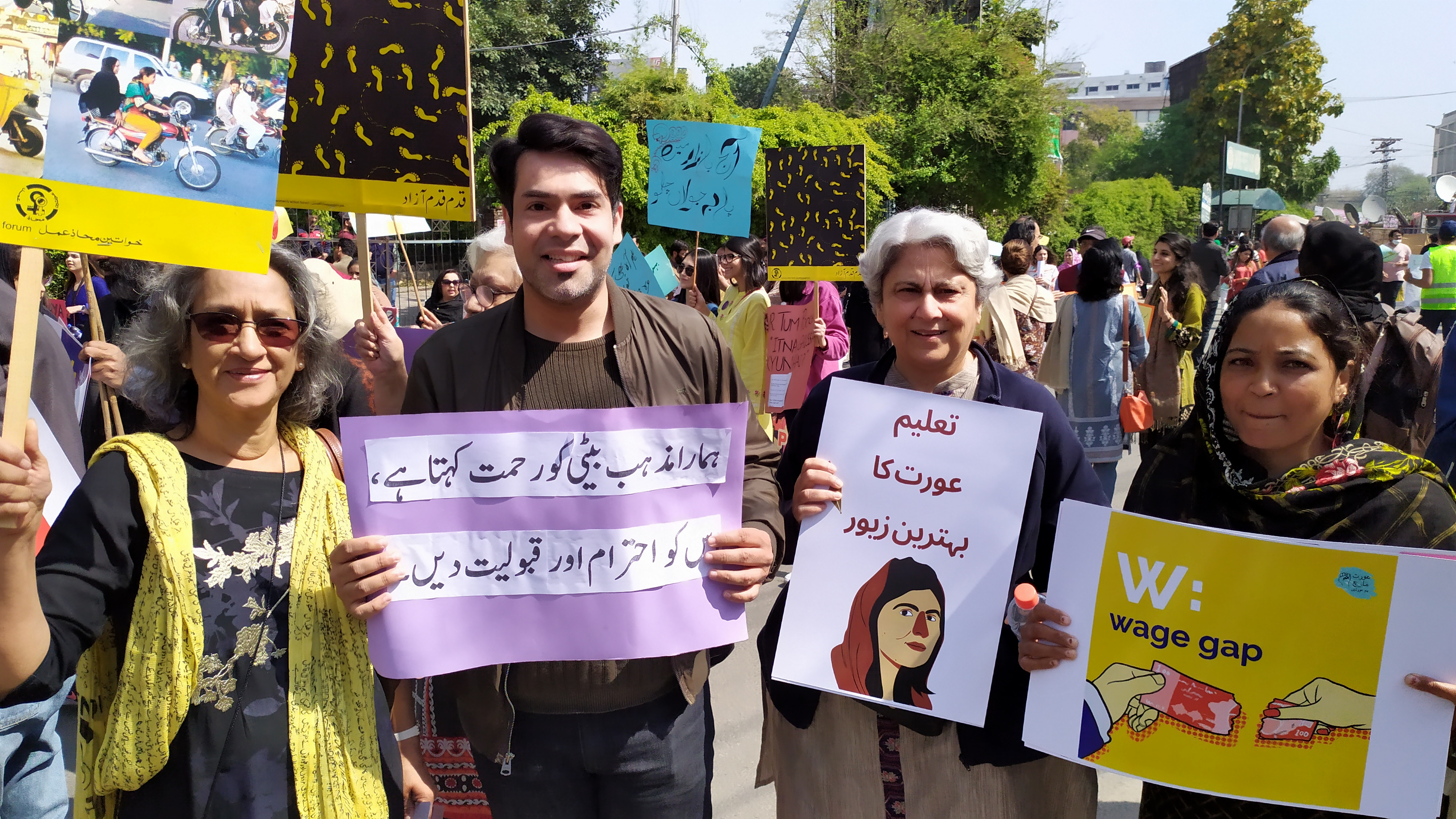
2020 Aurat March (Women's March) in Lahore, Pakistan on International Women's Day

Aurat March is International Women's Day women's procession walk organized in various cities of Pakistan including Lahore, Hyderabad, Karachi and Islamabad. The first Aurat March was held in Pakistan on 8 March 2018 (in the city of Karachi). In 2019, it was organised in Lahore and Karachi by a women's collective called Hum Auratein (We the Women), and in other parts of the country, including Islamabad, Hyderabad, Quetta, Mardan, and Faisalabad, by Women democratic front (WDF), Women Action Forum (WAF), and others. The march was endorsed by the Lady Health Workers Association, and included representatives from multiple women's-rights organizations. The march called for more accountability for violence against women, and to support for women who experience violence and harassment at the hands of security forces, in public spaces, at home, and at the workplace. Reports suggest that more and more women rushed to join the march until the crowd was scattered. Women (as well as men) carried posters bearing phrases such as 'Ghar ka Kaam, Sab ka Kaam', and 'Women are humans, not honour' became a rallying cry.

==== Pakistani Women's rights activism and NGOs ====
Asma Jahangir was a human rights lawyer and advocate for marginalized communities in Pakistan, known for her work in the fields of justice, democracy, and gender equality.

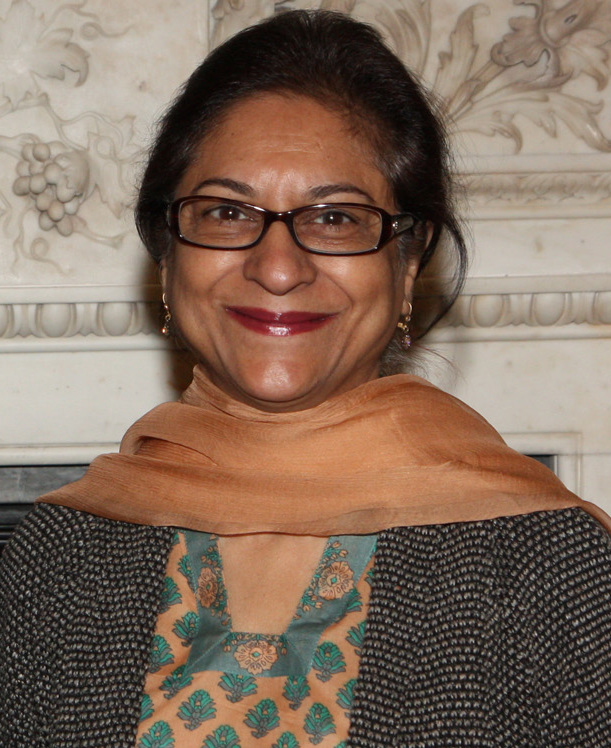
Asma Jahangir - Icon of Justice in Pakistan

Pakistani civil society and Pakistani feminists have produced a significant number of NGOs and proactive activism including that of Me Too Movement and annual Aurat March which work towards improve Pakistani women's global situation and particularly to prevent violence against women, for instance:

- the All Pakistan Women's Association, founded in 1949,
- the Aurat Foundation, registered in 1986,
- Blue Veins, which works primarily on health issues in rural areas,
- the Society for Appraisal and Women Empowerment in Rural Areas (SAWERA), founded in 2004 in Khyber Agency, famous for the assassination of its founder Fareeda Afridi who was gunned down in June 2012.
- In a landmark legal challenge against state airline, Pakistan International Airline (PIA), in March 2018, plaintiff Komal Zafar argued that failure to select her as cadet pilot was unconstitutional. Justice Muhammad Farrukh Irfan Khan of Lahore High Court passed the orders on a petition, filed by Komal Zafar for the implementation of women quota in the pilots' recruitment process of the PIA. During the hearing, the petitioner's counsel submitted that women were ignored in the recruitment process for filling pilots' vacancies despite 10 per cent quota specified in the policy. He contended that the step was a violation of the policy, and pleaded to issue directions for completing the recruitment process on the pilots' posts reserved for women.}
- War Against Rape an NGO with the stated mission to work towards creating a rape free society.

=== Science, technology, engineering and mathematics ===
Number of Pakistani women in 'STEM' is low due to one of the highest gender gaps in STEM fields. However, over the time, some Pakistani women have emerged as scientists in fields like Physics, Biology and computer sciences.

Code Girls is a women-only coding bootcamp made to tackle the gender disparity in the tech industry of Pakistan. Other than Code Girls, there is Women in Tech PK, an initiative that helps women grow in the field of tech, it focuses on gender equality in Pakistan's tech industry.

Some notable Pakistani women contributing to STEM are:

- Nergis Mavalvala :Pakistani-American physicist
- Tasneem Zehra Husain : a theoretical physicist
- Azra Quraishi : a botanist
- Arfa Karim : a computer prodigy
- Mariam Sultana : an astrophysicist
- Talat Shahnaz Rahman:a condensed matter physicist
- Aban Markar Kabraji: a biologist
- Asifa Akhtar: a biologist
- Asghari Maqsood: a physicist

=== Arts and entertainment ===
==== Actresses ====
- Angeline Malik with her campaign #inkaarkaro #mujhayjeenaydo and #meriawaazsuno created a platform to bring many celebrities together like Bushra Ansari, Zeba Bakhtiar, and Samina Ahmed to raise their voice against child abuse and in support of women's rights.
- Zeba Bakhtiar
- Samina Pirzada
- Mahira Khan made her name with Humsafar and Sadqay Tumhary. She also appeared in Bol and Bin Roye.
- Marina Khan starred in Dhoop Kinaray and Tanhaiyaan. Portraying sometimes headstrong or idiosyncratically tough female characters.

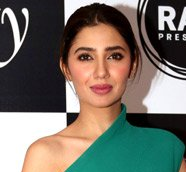

- Ayesha Omar more than often depicts the young and rich youth of Pakistan. The young actress delved into the realm of music, even winning an award for Lux Style Award for Best Album. She also starred in Pakistani movie Karachi se Lahore.
- Sanam Saeed appeared in Zindagi Gulzar Hai.
- Mehwish Hayat is an actress who has starred in Jawani Phir Nahi Ani, the highest grossing Pakistani film, she also appeared in various television ads in dramas.
- Mahnoor Baloch has worked in many serials and film Main Hoon Shahid Afridi.
- Hina Dilpazeer known as Momo, appeared in Bulbulay.
- Sultana Siddiqui is the President and Founder of Hum Network in Pakistan. Hum TV has received the prestigious Lux Style Award, four years in a row. Born in Karachi, Sultana was the first woman to start her own TV channel.

==== Singers ====
- Abida Parveen

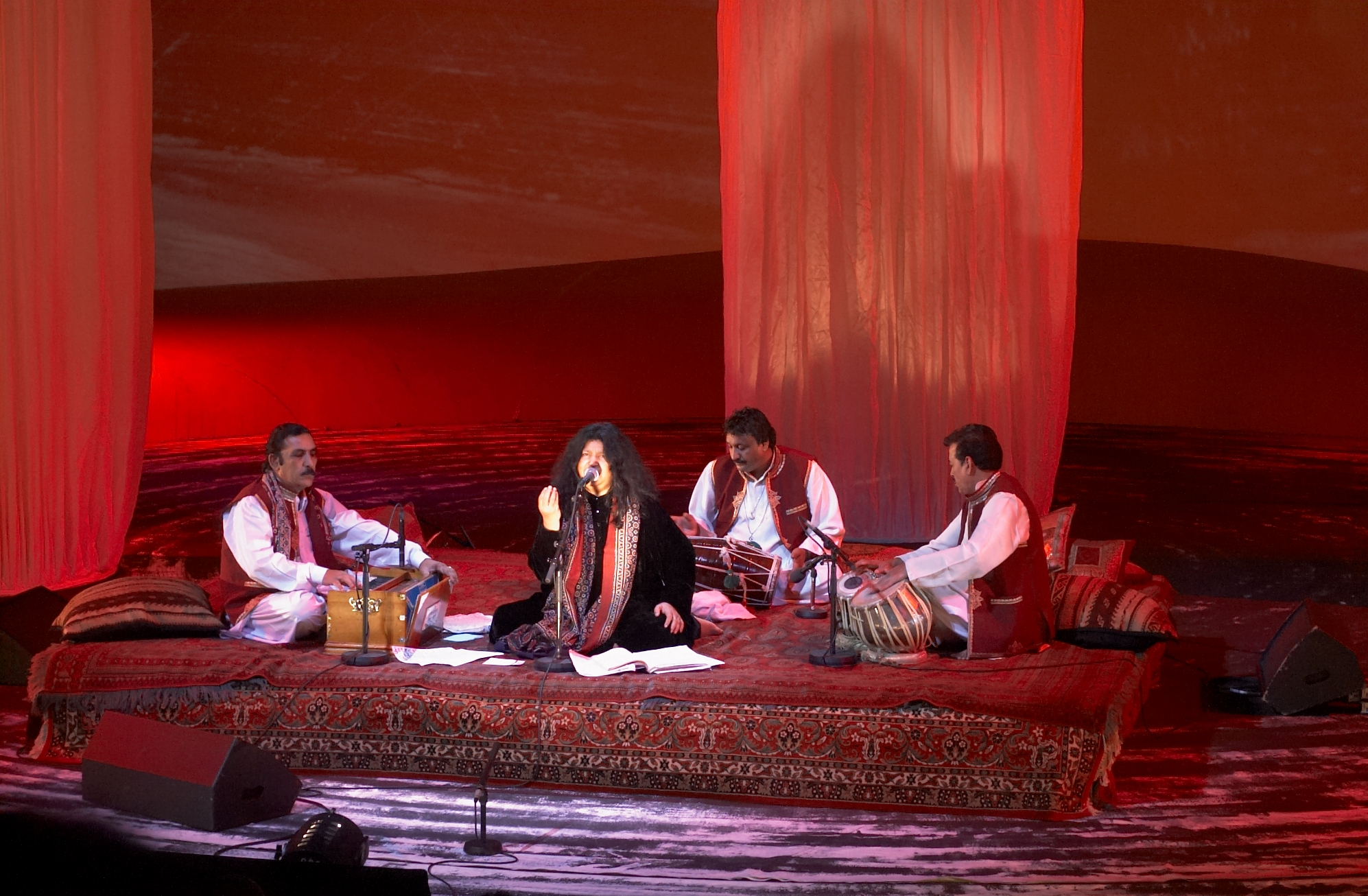
Abida Parveen at her concert in Oslo, 2007

- Noor Jehan was the melodious lady singer of the sub continent.
- Ayesha Omer
- Reshma (1947–2013)
- Farida Khanum
- Nayyara Noor
- Iqbal Bano
- Tahira Syed
- Nazia Hassan was an iconic female Pakistani pop singer.
- Hadiqa Kiani is a recipient of the country's highest civilian honour and is considered the "Most Popular Female Singer of Pakistan" for the past two decades. She has sung in over a dozen languages and has represented Pakistan internationally through music.
- Momina Mustehsan is a Pakistani musician and social activist. Shot to fame after her debut performance on Pakistani music show Coke Studio. She has used her fame to speak candidly about issues like cyber bullying and depression.
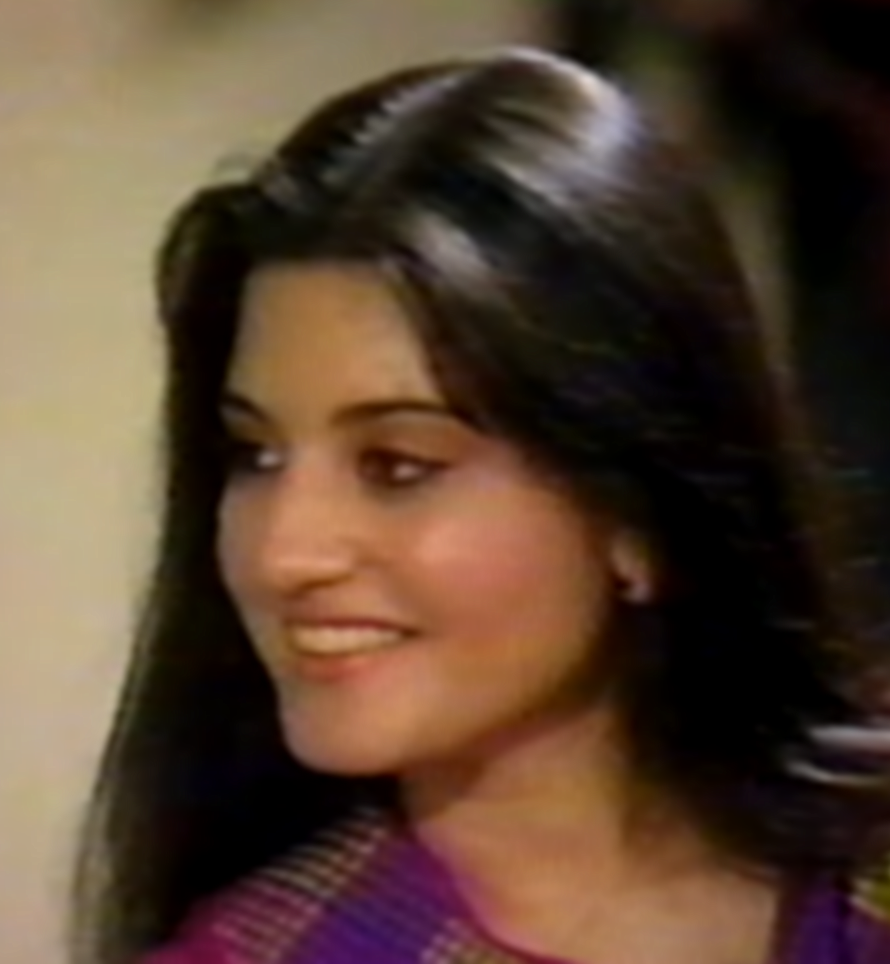
- Nazia Hassan - famous singer, founder of pop music in Pakistan
  Meesha Shafi
- Gul Panra
- Quratulain Baloch
- Annie Khalid
- Shazia Manzoor
- Rabi Peerzada

=== Pakistan Air Force ===
Since 2006, Pakistan Air Force allowed women to take part in combat roles. Previously, women only took part in non-combat roles in Pakistan Air Force.

- Saira Batool, is the first Pakistani female pilot from Hazara community in Pakistan. She and three other women were the first females to join Pakistan Air Force as fighter pilots in 2006. The three other women were Saba Khan, Nadia Gul and Mariam Khalil.
- Marium Mukhtiar, was a female Air Force pilot and a recipient of Tamgha-e-Basalat. She was the first woman to be killed in line of duty after her aircraft crashed on 24 November 2015.
- Kainat Junaid, is the first woman fighter pilot from Lower Dir, Khyber Pakhtunkhwa.

=== Sports ===
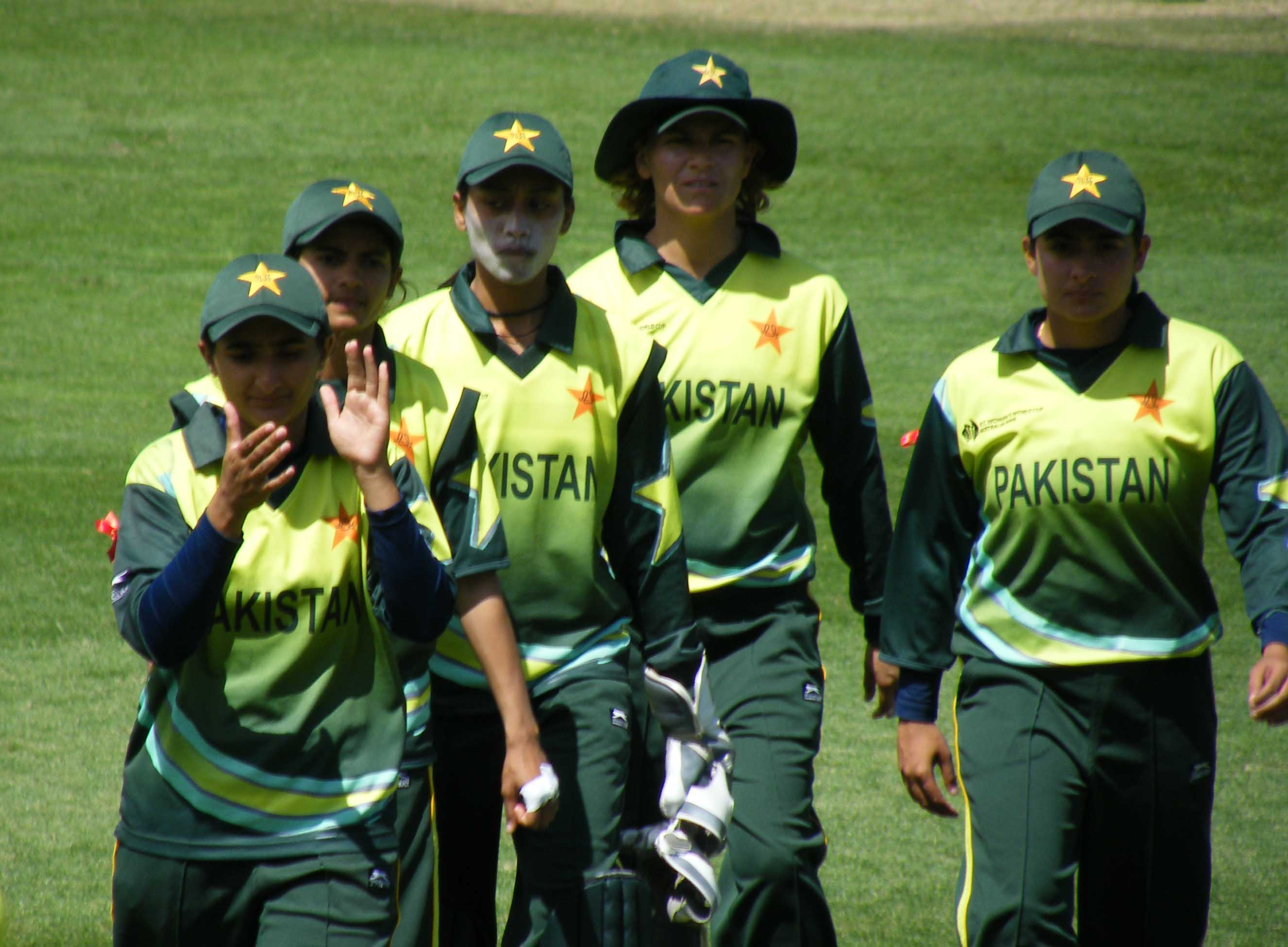
Pakistani women's cricket team

Sportswomen of Pakistan have always been plagued by the patriarchal society and many have come forward to claim that coaches, selectors and others who are in position of power demand sexual favours. Sexual abuse of this kind has led some athletes to commit suicide due to inaction of authorities in pursuing the suspects. In some cases the female athletes who register the cases of sexual abuse and harassment are banned or put on probation.

In 1996, when sisters Shaiza and Sharmeen Khan first tried to introduce women's cricket in Pakistan, they were met with court cases and even death threats. The government refused them permission to play India in 1997, and ruled that women were forbidden from playing sports in public. However, later they were granted permission, and the Pakistani women's cricket team played its first recorded match on 28 January 1997 against New Zealand in Christchurch.

Shazia Hidayat was the sole woman Olympian on the Pakistan team at the 2000 Summer Olympic Games and the second woman to represent Pakistan in an Olympic event.

Sidra Sadaf, a woman cyclist won a silver medal at the 11th South Asian Games in Dhaka, Bangladesh in January 2010. Naseem Hameed achieved the fastest woman sprinter record in South Asia following the 2010 South Asian games; she gained widespread popularity for the remarkable feat.

Rukhsana Parveen and Sofia Jawed became first Pakistani women to bag international medals in boxing.

Sana Mir is captain of the Pakistan women's cricket team. She won two gold medals at Asian Games in 2010 and 2014. She started playing street cricket at the age of five and studied engineering before becoming a cricketer by profession.

Hajra Khan is the captain of Pakistan's women's football team. She is the only player to have scored more than 100 goals in her club career. 21-year-old made history when she was invited to play in Germany for top clubs SGS Essen, FSV Gütersloh and VfL Sindelfingen.

=== Literature ===
Ismat Chughtai, who was part of the Progressive Writers Association, is regarded as an important feminist writer of Urdu. Parveen Shakir, Kishwar Naheed and Fehmida Riaz are also renowned for their feminist poetry in Urdu. Modern fiction writers such as Rizwana Syed Ali and Bano Qudisa have also highlighted gender issues. Bapsi Sidhwa is one of Pakistan's most prominent English fiction writers. In 1991, she received Sitara-i-Imtiaz, Pakistan's highest honour in arts. Sana Munir is another well known writer. Munir's early schooling was done in Nigeria and she then studied English Literature, Psychology and Mass Communication. Her love for books is influenced by her father, who ensured that they were surrounded by quality books. Her writing style is very gripping, creating a very clear visual image of the characters and their physical settings.

=== Other fields ===
Some of the notable Pakistani women in other fields including computing, education and business are:

- Marvi Memon, ex-CEO Trakker
- Bridget Sequeira F.M.C.K., was a Franciscan Religious Sister who founded the Franciscan Missionaries of Christ the King, the only religious congregation for women founded in Pakistan
- Bernadette Louise Dean, former Principal of Kinnaird College, Lahore
- Mary Emily, recipient of the Sitara-e-Imtiaz for services to education
- Waheeda Baig started operating a driving school for women in the fifties. After the war of 1965, she became a full-time cab driver.
- Aban Marker Kabraji, environmentalist and Asia Regional Director of IUCN nominated for Sitara-e-Imtiaz for her social services,
- Norma Fernandes, Tamgha-i-Imtiaz, Former Head Mistress of Karachi Grammar School
- Zinia Pinto, teacher, principal and administrator of St Joseph's Convent School (Karachi) 1956 – 2012.
- Yolande Henderson, former headmistress of the St Patrick's High School O' Levels section
- Jacqueline Maria Dias, nurse and professor of nursing at the Aga Khan University
- Rubina Gillani is a Pakistani medical doctor and The Fred Hollows Foundation's Country Manager
- Riffat Arif, also known as Sister Zeph, is a teacher, women's activist and philanthropist from Gujranwala.
- Ruth Lewis awarded Sitara-i-Imtiaz for her work at Darul Sukun, a home for the disabled.
- Jehan Ara is the President of one of the largest tech associations in Pakistan. She is also a prominent advocate for cyber freedom and net neutrality.
- Shaheen Sardar Ali, PhD; FRSA, First Pakistani woman Law Professor, first woman cabinet minister in the north west frontier province (now Khyber Pukhtunkhwa province) 1999–2001; first chairperson, National Commission on the Status of Women (NCSW) 2000–2001. First women law professor of Pakistani origin in a UK university. She has written extensively in the field of Islamic law, women's human rights in Islam and international law, children's rights
- Fauzia Minallah is the first and youngest woman political cartoonist to win the All Pakistan Newspaper Society award. She is also the winner of Ron Kovic Peace prize.
- Muniba Mazari is Pakistan's only wheel chair-bound TV anchor. She was part of Forbes Magazine's 30 Under 30 list for 2017. In December 2016, she was named Pakistan's first female Goodwill Ambassador to the United Nations.
- Fiza Farhan is the co-founder of the Buksh Foundation, a microfinance institution in Pakistan. Her organisation has brought solar powered lights to around 6750 household all across the country.
- Sadia Bashir is a Pakistani entrepreneur who has dedicated her life to video games. She has co-founded Pixel Art Games Academy. Bashir has been awarded by the US Embassy at the Women Entrepreneurs Summit in 2017.
- Masarrat Misbah is a distinguished entrepreneur, cosmetologist and philanthropist. She set up the Depilex Smile again Foundation in 2005. The foundation helps those who had suffered due to atrocities of deliberate burning.
- Sharmeen Obaid-Chinoy is the first Pakistani to win two Oscar awards. She won Best Documentary Short Subject for A Girl In The River: The Price of Forgiveness. Prime Minister Nawaz Sharif vowed to end honour killings following her win.
- Arfa Karim became the world's youngest Microsoft Certified Professional at the age of 9 years. She represented Pakistan in various prestigious technology related events. The computer prodigy died in 2012 at the age 16 years.
- Shamim Akhtar is Pakistan's first female truck driver. She is challenging stereotypes in the transport sector. Despite financial crisis, she continues to drive trucks despite the challenges.
- Ms. Tahira Qazi's name will continue to be a source of strength for all those standing for peace and principles. In a bid to protect her students from the militants, Ms. Qazi had jumped in front of the children and said to the terrorists, "I am their mother" She embraced martydom after a taking a bullet to her head.
- Zainab Abbas is the first female Pakistani presenter at the ICC Cricket World Cup. Zainab has worked for Ten Sports, her sports features have been acknowledged by well-known cricket forums such as ESPN. She was also recently awarded the 'Best Female Sports Journalist' at a Pakistani sports awards. She has also been called the 'National Lucky Charm' of Pakistani Cricket. The makeup artist turned news host turned Cricket analyst is turning heads in the Cricketing World.
- Zahida Kazmi is considered the country first female registered Taxi/Cab Driver.

== See also ==
- Acid Survivors Trust International
- Acid throwing
- Aurat March
- Divorce in Pakistan
- Feminism in Pakistan
- Honour killing in Pakistan
- Jirga
- Me Too movement (Pakistan)
- Modesty patrol
- Polygamy in Pakistan
- Hindu marriage laws in Pakistan
- Rape in Pakistan
- Swara
- Vani
- Women's organisations based in Pakistan
- Women's rights in Pakistan
- Women related laws in Pakistan

General:

- Human rights in Pakistan
- Women in Islam
- Women's rights
- Women in Asia
