= Pakistani women in STEM =

While STEM (science, technology, engineering and mathematics) fields all over the world are dominated by men, the number of Pakistani women in 'STEM' is low due to one of the highest gender gaps in STEM fields. However, over time, some Pakistani women have emerged as scientists in fields like physics, biology and computer sciences.

== Gender gap in Pakistan ==
Pakistan has one of the highest gender gaps in the world, and it is the third least performer in gender parity according to a 2020 report by the World Economic Forum. The low literacy rate of women in Pakistan, despite women making up almost half the population, is one of the factors in a high gender gap in STEM fields. This literacy rate is even lower in science and technology.

=== Facts ===
According to UNESCO, among students enrolled in bachelor's degrees, 47% are women while 53% are men. The number of women pursuing doctoral studies is only 36%, while the percentage of men is 64%. There is also a significant gender gap in research sector, with women making only 34% of researchers.

Among students in universities, the field of natural sciences is reported to have only 40% women students, while medical sciences have 45%, engineering has 21% and agricultural sciences have only 12%.

=== Engineering gender gap ===
According to the World Economic Forum, only 4.9% of engineering jobs are held by women in Pakistan. The numbers are particularly low in the energy sector with only 3% female engineers in the power transmission sector. The field of artificial intelligence has also seen few numbers of women engineers, with only 22% part of the workforce.

=== Bridging the gap ===
Efforts have been done by the government of Pakistan as well as women who are part of STEM fields, to reduce the wide gender gap in STEM. Since 2018, the government of Pakistan has worked to improve wage equality and its position on educational attainment index. Workplace sexual harassment laws have also been made to encourage women to become part of the workforce in both STEM fields as well as non STEM fields. Many private organizations like Women in tech, Women Engineers Pakistan have been founded to encourage STEM education in women.

== Notable women ==
Some notable Pakistani women contributing to STEM are:

- Nergis Mavalvala: is Pakistani-American physicist known for her breakthrough research in gravitational waves detection in 2015. She has also received the prestigious MacArthur Foundation Award in 2010. Nergis became the first female Dean of school of sciences at MIT in 2020.
- Tasneem Zehra Husain: is theoretical physicist and among the few Pakistani women to obtain a doctorate in physics. She is also the first Pakistani woman working on string theory. Husain has represented Pakistan at the Meeting of Nobel Laureates in Lindau, Germany and led the Pakistan team to the World Year of Physics (WYP) Launch Conference in Paris.
- Asma Zaheer: is computer scientist and the first Pakistani to receive "the best of IBM award, 2019".
- Azra Quraishi: She was a botanist who is credited for increasing potato yield by 5% in Pakistan. This improved Pakistan's position in trade and brought Azra, national recognition. She was awarded the Norman Borlaug Award in 1997.
- Arfa Karim: was a computer prodigy who became the youngest person to become a Microsoft certified Professional in 2004. She was personally invited by Bill Gates to the Microsoft headquarters in USA. Arfa was also named in the Guinness book of world records.
- Mariam Sultana: is an astrophysicist. She became the first female astrophysicist in Pakistan after she obtained her PhD in 2012.
- Talat Shahnaz Rahman is a condensed matter physicist. Her research topics include surface phenomena and excited media, including catalysis, vibrational dynamics, and magnetic excitations.
- Aban Markar Kabraji: is a biologist and scientist of Parsi origin. She is a regional director of the Asia Regional Office of IUCN, the International Union for Conservation of Nature. She was awarded the Tamgha-e-Imtiaz for her outstanding contribution and dedication to the cause of environmental protection, sustainable development and nature conservation.
- Asifa Akhtar: is a biologist who has worked in the area of chromosomes. She became the first international female vice president of the biology and medicine section at Germany's prestigious Max Planck Society. Asifa has also been awarded the European Life Science Organization (ELSO) award.
- Farzana Aslam: is a physicist and astronomer. She has worked in the area of polymer composite sensitized with semiconductor nanoparticles, photon and laser sciences. For her contributions, Farzana was awarded a commendation award at the Photon 04 conference held by Institute of Physics at Glasgow.
