= Pakistan women's national boxing team =

The Pakistan women's national boxing team represents Pakistan in international boxing competitions. It is administered by the Pakistan Boxing Federation (PBF). The team competed internationally for the first time at the South Asian Games held in Guwahati, India in 2016. It debuted at the continental level at the Asian Games held in Jakarta, Indonesia in 2018.

== History ==
For the first time, Pakistan send its boxing team to an international competition in 2016. A three-member team; Khoushleem, Rukhsana Parveen and Sofia Javed, competed at the South Asian Games in Guwahati, India in 2016. They returned home with two bronze medals in 60 kg and 75 kg weight categories. In 2018, the team debut at the Asia Games held in Jakarta, Indonesia where it sent a two-member team. The team competed at the South Asian Games held in Kathmandu, Nepal in 2019 where it won three bronze medals.

== Members ==
Members
Name	Team (domestic)	Competitions	Weight Category	Medals
Khoushleem Bano		South Asian Games: 2016	51 kg	
Mehreen		South Asian Games: 2019	51 kg	Bronze
Razia Bano Aziz		Asian Games: 2018; South Asian Games: 2019	51 kg	- Bronze
Rukhsana Parveen		Asian Games: 2018; South Asian Games: 2016, 2019	60 kg 60 kg (2016) 64 kg (2019)	- Bronze (2016, 2019)
Sofia Javed		South Asian Games: 2016	75 kg	Bronze

== Medals ==
South Asian Games
Games	Gold	Silver	Bronze	Total
(India) Guwahati (2016)	0	0	2	2
(Nepal) Kathmandu (2019)	0	0	3	3
Total	0	0	5	5
