= List of Urdu fiction writers =

Urdu fiction is a narrative and imaginary work, a great work and a part of Urdu literature.

== Fiction writers ==
- Abdul Hameed
- Ali Akbar Natiq
- Ashfaq Ahmed
- Bano Qudsia
- Altaf Fatima
- Ibn-e-Safi
- Mazhar Kaleem
- Mirza Hadi Ruswa
- Naseem Hijazi
- Qudrat Ullah Shahab
- Rasheed Amjad
- Rahman Abbas
- Rizwana Syed Ali
- Shaukat Thanvi
- Syed Qasim Mahmood
