= Fareeda Kokikhel Afridi =

Women's rights activist

Fareeda "Kokikhel" Afridi
- Born: Khyber tribal area, Federally Administered Tribal Areas (FATA), Pakistan
- Died: Hayatabad, Peshawar, Pakistan
- Education: Master's degree in gender studies
- Occupations: Feminist, women's rights activist
- Organization(s): Society for Appraisal and Women Empowerment in Rural Areas (SAWERA)
- Known for: Women's rights activism, co-founding SAWERA

Fareeda "Kokikhel" Afridi (Urdu: فریدہ کوکی خیل آفریدی) was a Pakistani feminist, a women's rights activist in Pakistan. In July 2012, at the age of 25, she was shot dead on her way to work.

Afridi was born and raised in the Khyber tribal area, part of the Federally Administered Tribal Areas (FATA), an impoverished semi-autonomous region in Pakistan's northwest, bordering Afghanistan.

She graduated from university with a master's degree in gender studies. While still in school, with her sister Noor Zia Afridi, she founded the Society for Appraisal and Women Empowerment in Rural Areas (SAWERA), a women-run NGO promoting women's empowerment in FATA.

Afridi was critical of the Pakistani government, the Taliban, and the patriarchal nature of Pakistani society.

In June 2012, she told journalists she was being threatened. Her friends and colleagues suspected the threats originated with FATA Taliban militants.

On 5 July 2012, as Afridi left her home to go to work in Hayatabad a suburb of Peshawar, she was shot once in the head and twice in the neck by two motorcyclists, who afterwards escaped. She died in hospital.

Condemning the murder at a protest camp organized by the Aurat Foundation along with Peshawar Press Club and Pakistan Federal Union of Journalists, Khyber Pakhtunkhwa's Information Minister Mian Iftikhar Hussain stated:

Imposing death decrees on individuals such as Farida has resulted in a negative portrayal of our country as well as Islam itself.

She was the second female in Khyber Pakhtunkhwa to be targeted by Taliban extremists.

== See also ==
- List of Muslim feminists
- List of unsolved murders (2000–present)
- Women in Pakistan
