= Masarrat Misbah =

Pakistani Pakistani beautician, entrepreneur, philanthropist

- Born: Masarrat Uddin Khan; 25 November 1959 (age 66); Karachi, Pakistan
- Other name: Masarrat Misbah
- Education: Shaw College
- Occupations: Beautician; Entrepreneur; Philanthropist; Actress
- Years active: 1980–present
- Known for: Depilex Smileagain Foundation
- Spouse: Amir (divorced)
- Children: 2
- Parent(s): Misbah Uddin Khan (father); Anisa (mother)
- Relatives: Nighat Misbah (sister)
- Awards: Pride of Performance (2010)

Masarrat Misbah (born 25 November 1959) is a Pakistani beautician, entrepreneur, actress and philanthropist. She is known for helping face burned women in Pakistan through her Depilex Smileagain Foundation.

== Early life ==
Misbah was born to Misbah Uddin Khan and Anisa on 25 November 1959 in Karachi, Pakistan. In 1980, she went to the United Kingdom where she attended the Shaw College of Beauty Therapy.

== Career ==
She later established the Depilex Smileagain Foundation, a nonprofit organization. In the 1990s, she worked in dramas on PTV. In 2010, she became the recipient of the Pride of Performance award for her contributions in the field of medical treatment and financial aid reportedly provided to the burn and acid attack victims, in particular females.

Masarrat Misbah received an award by the Italian government on Women's Day for her courage and commitment, making her the first Pakistani woman to receive an award by the Italian government.

== Personal life ==
Musarrat married Amir and had two children with him. Later, they divorced, with Musarrat taking custody of her children. Her younger sister, Nighat Misbah, is the Director of Depilex.

== Filmography ==
=== Television series ===
Year	Title	Role	Network
1995	Amar Bail	Mahrukh	PTV
1995	Asawari	Ashari	PTV
1998	Cat Walk	Nayla	PTV
2023	Ab Meri Bari	Masarrat	Aan TV

== Awards and recognition ==
Year	Award	Category	Result	Title	Ref.
2008	7th Lux Style Awards	Best Fashion Makeup & Hair Artist	Nominated	—N/a	
2010	Pride of Performance	Award by the President of Pakistan	Won	—N/a	
2015	14th Lux Style Awards	Lifetime Achievement Award	Won	—N/a	
2017	Women's Day Award	Awarded By Italian Government	Won	—N/a	
2018	6th Hum Awards	Excellence In Humanity Award	Won	—N/a	
2021	2nd Lux Hum Women Leaders Awards	HUM Women Leaders Award	Won	—N/a	

== Controversies ==
Since 2003, the NGO provided medical treatment for about seven hundred and sixty victims; however most of the victims died due to lack of facilities, though her organization was funded by the government and non government agencies.

In 2010, the Islamabad High Court seized her bank account for her alleged involvement in misusing funds she received from national and international agencies for her NGO which claimed to have provided medical and financial aid to burn victims. Depilex Smileagain Foundation allegedly collected funds from foreign charitable organizations after it alleged to have helped acid victims. The organization established by her was also donated two acre land for the establishment of hospital and training camps for the burn victims; however the project of PKR380,000,000 was not completed.

== See also ==
- Women in Pakistan
