= Depilex Smileagain Foundation =

Pakistani nonprofit organization

- ڈیپلیکس سمائل اگین فاؤنڈیشن
- Formation: 2003; 23 years ago
- Founded at: Lahore, Punjab, Pakistan
- Type: nonprofit foundation
- Legal status: Active
- Purpose: Aid for female acid attack victims
- Location: Lahore
- Region served: Punjab, Pakistan
- Chairwoman: Musarrat Misbah
- Board of directors: Musarrat Misbah
- Website: depilexsmileagain.com

Depilex Smileagain Foundation is a Pakistani nonprofit organization, started by human rights activist Musarrat Misbah to provide medical treatment and financial aid to the female acid attack victims.

== History ==
Human rights activist Musarrat Misbah established the nonprofit organization Depilex Smileagain Foundation in Lahore in 2003, but officially registered it in 2005.

According to The Guardian in 2020, Misbah's Depilex salons were training and hiring acid burned victims and survivors.

== Awards and recognitions ==
In 2010, Misbah received the Pride of Performance award for her contributions to medical treatment and financial aid for burn and acid attack victims, particularly women, through her foundation.

Misbah was also honored by the Italian government on International Women's Day for her courage and commitment, becoming the first Pakistani woman to receive such recognition from Italy.

== Controversies ==
According to a 2017 report, since 2003, the foundation had provided medical treatment to approximately 760 victims. However, the majority of the victims succumbed to their injuries due to a lack of adequate facilities, despite the foundation receiving funding from the government and non-governmental agencies.

In 2010, the Islamabad High Court froze the bank account of Misbah for her alleged involvement in misusing funds received from national and international agencies for her foundation. The foundation had claimed to provide medical and financial aid to burn victims but allegedly collected funds from foreign charitable organizations based on these claims.

The organization also received a donation of two acres of land for the establishment of a hospital and training camps for burn victims. However, the project, estimated to cost PKR 380,000,000, was not completed.

== See also ==
- Acid attack
- List of non-governmental organizations in Pakistan
- Saving Face (2012 film)
