= Sister Zeph =

Pakistani teacher, women's activist, and philanthropist

- Born: Riffat Arif; Gujranwala, Pakistan
- Education: Master's degree in Political science Master's degree in History
- Alma mater: University of the Punjab
- Occupations: Teacher, women’s activist and philanthropist
- Organization(s): Zephaniah Women's Education and Empowerment Foundation (ZWEE)
- Known for: Flight of the Falcons documentary
- Awards: Lynn Syms Prize 2014; 2023 Global Teacher Prize

Sister Zeph, birth name Riffat Arif (born 1983/1984), is a Pakistani teacher, women's activist and philanthropist from Gujranwala, Pakistan. She is the founder of the Zephaniah Women's Education and Empowerment Foundation (ZWEE).

== Life ==
Growing up, Arif faced bad treatment and discrimination from her schoolteachers because she was Christian, a religious minority in the country.

She was a leader at school and had plans of becoming a lawyer. When she was thirteen her first article on women's rights appeared in Pakistan's leading newspaper, the Daily Jang.

Arif left school in 1997, at age 13. She began teaching herself, her younger sister, and her younger sister's friends at home. Around the same time, Arif learned embroidery in order to support her ambitions. She passed the tenth grade Board examination. It was around this time that she started teaching other girls. She distributed flyers among her neighbours announcing free education for girls.

In 2008, Arif began sharing her story online.

The girls initially studied in rented, open roof houses with Sister Zeph's financial support. Using self study she completed a master's degree in political science in 2010, and a master's degree in history in 2013, both from University of the Punjab.

== Zephaniah Women's Education and Empowerment Foundation ==
In 2013, Sister Zeph won an award which gave her $20,000 in prize money, which she used to expand her school, hire more teachers, and establish a vocational center in Gujranwala, which serves both students and local women. The center offers classes on IT and digital literacy skills, English, stitching, hairdressing and makeup, and martial arts. The center also has a clothing line, which is produced by 30 women employees and whose income goes back into the school and center.

In 2015, Sister Zeph's organization became a registered school. By 2016, her organization had taught over 500 girls and empowered 100 more. As of 2023, Sister Zeph's school provides free education to 200 students, from kindergarten through tenth grade. Many of the teachers are former students.

The Zephaniah Women's Education and Empowerment Foundation (ZWEE) also organizes twice weekly afternoon classes for children who can't attend school full-time because they are working to support their families.

== Teaching philosophy ==
Sister Zeph has said that she approaches teaching with compassion and affection. In an interview with NPR, she explained "when a teacher shows such affection to the children, they feel protected, they feel like they are not far from home, they are just with another mother...I did not get to enjoy my own childhood. I want children to be pampered and loved and have a childhood". To that end, neither Sister Zeph nor her teachers use corporal punishment on students.

Arif also values education highly, and in her outreach to families with children who work rather than attend school, she emphasizes that education is more important than a proper diet or a better house.

== Documentary ==
In 2015, a documentary, Flight of the Falcons, was made about Arif's life, and the lives of three of her students in their struggle against child marriage, corporal punishment and societal pressures, towards empowering girls and young women through education. The documentary's coverage of Sister Zeph and her school led to the Malala Fund offering her assistance.

The documentary made it to the finals of the 2015 Asia-Pacific Child Rights Award for Television and won the gold medal in the Best Documentary: Community Portraits category at New York Festivals 2016.

== Awards ==
She won the Lynn Syms Prize in 2014, which honoured her as a grassroots leader.

She was a KAICIID International Fellow in 2021.

In 2023, Sister Zeph won the $1 million Global Teacher Prize in honor of her achievements. She stated she would use the prize money to build a better school building.
