= Society for Appraisal and Women Empowerment in Rural Areas =

Human rights NGO in the tribal areas of north west Pakistan

Society for Appraisal and Women Empowerment in Rural Areas (SAWERA) is a human rights organization, NGO in KPK and Tribal Regions, Pakistan. It works for the welfare of women and children. It was founded in 2004 and formally registered in 2008 by the human rights defender Noorzia Afridi and Fareeda Afridi and some other like minded women. It was started from Khyber Agency (now District Khyber) Federally Administrative Tribal Areas now Merged Areas. In July 2012, Farida was killed by motorcycle-borne gunmen.

SAWERA received the 2014 Front Line Defenders Award for Human Rights Defenders at Risk.
