= Rukhsana Parveen =

Pakistani boxer

Personal information
- Full name: Rukhsana Parveen
- Nationality: Pakistani
- Born: May 5, 1992 (age 34) Pakistan
- Height: 1.62 m (5 ft 4 in)
- Weight: 64 kg (141 lb)

Sport
- Sport: Boxing
Medal record
Representing Pakistan
South Asian Games
Bronze medal – third place	2016 Guwahati	60kg
Bronze medal – third place	2019 Kathmandu	64kg

Rukhsana Parveen (born 5 May 1992) also spelled Rukhsana Perveen is a female boxer from Pakistan. In 2016, she along with two other teammates became the first women boxers from Pakistan to compete in an international competition when they participated at the South Asian Games in Guwahati, India. She was also included in the first ever team sent to the Asian Games.

== Career ==
Parveen has stated that she was inspired to take up boxing after watching the biographical movie of the Indian boxer, Mary Kom. She took up the sport in 2015 and had been coached by Nauman Karim for only eight months before she was selected to participate in the 2016 South Asian Games held in Guwahati, India.

=== National ===
Representing Punjab, Parveen won gold in the light weight category at the First National Women Boxing Championship held in Lahore in 2018.

=== International ===
==== South Asian Games ====
Parveen was being coached by Shehnaz Kamal when she along with Khoushleem Bano and Sofia Javed were scouted by the Pakistan Boxing Federation and included into the team to compete at the 2016 South Asian Games held in Guwahati, India. Parveen reached the semi-finals in the 60 kg category and earned a bronze medal. With this medal, she became the second Pakistani woman (after Sofia Javed) to win an international medal in boxing. At the 2019 South Asian Games in Kathmandu, Nepal, Parveen repeated her performance by claiming another bronze but this time in the 64 kg category.

==== Asian Games ====
To prepare for the 2018 Asian Games held in Jakarta, Indonesia, Parveen along with five other women were part of a training camp held in the capital. Islamabad. She along with Razia Bano was then selected as part of Pakistan's first ever team to compete at the continental level where she participated in the 60 kg category. In the round of 16 she lost to the Indian boxer, Pavitra.
