= Rizwana Syed Ali =

Pakistani writer

Rizwana Syed Ali is a fiction writer from Pakistan. She has had a long career as an author and has used her writings for creating awareness in the society.

== Introduction ==
Rizwana Syed Ali is known for her works in Urdu fiction. A short story-writer and a novelist, Rizwana entered the field as a young writer for children's magazines. Most of those who have grown up reading Urdu magazines Taleem-o-Tarbiat and Naunehal are familiar with her stories for children. Her fiction for kids and youngsters won her several awards including those from the National Book Foundation and Cambridge Educational.

Urdu afsana (short-story) was a genre Rizwana entered a few years later and was published in Urdu Digest, Chilman etc. In recent years the focus of her writings has entirely shifted to afsana and novel. Her first collection of afsana titled Nok-i-Qalam Pe Khar was published in 2003. Arranged in chronological order, this collection traced her career in afsana naveesi. Next in line was Peelay pholo ka noha a collection of 17 afsanas published in 2007. Rizwana entered the world of novel writing in 2011 with the publication of Khwabgazeeda. One reviewer writes about her novel as:

The writer is deeply in touch with the conditions of her people and can cut right to the heart of their interactions. The vastness of characters makes the novel kaleidoscopic. … the scenes are beautifully constructed to depict the society in which characters live but the narrative dominates the novel instead of the characters. ... there is enough drama to embody emotions. ... Certainly it is the stagnation that has made the [Pakistani] society stink. Ali's progressive approach towards the issues shows us the tiny speck of light at the end of the tunnel. She reminds us that no matter how bleak the circumstances may be, it is never too late to take the initiative for change.

Another dimension to Rizwana's work is her journalistic writings. She has been associated with the Urdu Dailies Islamabad Times, Ausaf and Subh as column-writer. Rizwana has always been a supporter of change through education in Pakistan. She has extensively written about the social disparities emanating from the stratified educational system in the country. In her research work on education, Seh Ranga Nizam-i-Taleem, she has argued that three systems of education that exist in Pakistan have damaged the society by deepening class differences. According to her, Pakistan's current education has set the society on a downward spiral instead of putting it on the path of development.

== Fiction ==
2011 Khwabgazeeda (Novel)
2007 Peelay Pholon Ka Noha (Short-stories Collection)

Ferozsons Publishers, Lahore

2003 Nok-i-Qalam pe Khar (Short-stories Collection)

Javedan Publishers, Islamabad

1995 Seh-Ranga Nizam-i-Taleem (Research)

Jang Publishers, Lahore

== Newspaper career ==
Permanent Column Title: Nok-i-Qalam pe Khar

- 2009 Islamabad Times
- 2006–2007 Daily Ausaf Islamabad
- 2004–2006 Daily Subh Peshwar

== Books for Children ==
- Bachpan Jhaorokay se
- Abdul Ka Khawab
- Darna Nahi
- Ab Jang Na Ho
- Resham
- Aik tha Jangal (3 vols)
- Ghommain Nagar Nagar
- Anokha Safar
