= Talat Rahman =

Pakistani-American condensed matter physicist

Talat Shahnaz Rahman
- Education: University of Karachi; University of Islamabad; University of Rochester
- Known for: Research on surface phenomena, catalysis, and molecular "walking" mechanisms
- Awards: Fellow, American Physical Society (1998); Humboldt Prize (2000); Fellow, American Vacuum Society (2016); AVS Recognition for Excellence in Mentoring (2022)
- Scientific career
- Fields: Condensed matter physics
- Workplaces: Kansas State University; University of Central Florida

Talat Shahnaz Rahman is a Pakistani-American condensed matter physicist whose research topics include surface phenomena and excited media, including catalysis, vibrational dynamics, and magnetic excitations. She has also helped develop molecules that can "walk" across a solid surface by moving one part of the molecule while keeping another part attached to the surface. She is a University of Central Florida Trustee Chair Professor and Pegasus Professor of Physics.

== Education and career ==
Rahman earned a bachelor's degree in physics from the University of Karachi in 1969, a master's degree from the University of Islamabad in 1970, and a Ph.D. from the University of Rochester in 1977. After postdoctoral research at the University of California, Irvine, she became an assistant professor at Kansas State University in 1984, where she was the university's first female physics faculty member, and by 2001 she was University Distinguished Professor there. She moved to the University of Central Florida in 2006 as Distinguished Professor and chair of the physics department; she became Pegasus Professor in 2012 and stepped down as chair in 2015.

== Recognition ==
Rahman became a Fellow of the American Physical Society in 1998, and a Fellow of the American Vacuum Society in 2016 in recognition of her theoretical and computational contributions to understanding the chemical, optical, magnetic, and vibrational properties of nanoscale materials, and to the rational design of functional materials through a bottom-up approach. She won the Humboldt Prize in 2000. In 2022, the American Vacuum Society gave her its Recognition for Excellence in Mentoring Award for her work supporting underrepresented groups and fostering an inclusive environment for aspiring scientists and engineers.
