= Murder of Noor Mukadam =

Pakistani victim of murder

Noor Mukadam
- Born: October 23, 1993; Amman, Jordan
- Died: 20 July 2021 (aged 27); Islamabad, Islamabad Capital Territory, Pakistan
- Cause of death: Murder by decapitation
- Father: Shaukat Mukadam

Noor Mukadam (Urdu: نور مقدم; 23 October 1993 – 20 July 2021) was a Pakistani victim of murder. She was 27 years old and the daughter of a former diplomat, Shaukat Mukadam. She was murdered at a house in an upscale neighborhood, Sector F-7/4, of Islamabad, on 20 July 2021. Noor was held hostage for two days, tortured with a knuckleduster, then decapitated with a knife. Noor was raped before being murdered.

The murder suspect was identified as 27-year-old Zahir Jaffer who was arrested at the scene of the crime and taken to the police station. The parents and household staff of Jaffer were arrested for hiding evidence and complicity, because Noor made multiple escape attempts but the household staff refused to permit her to leave. The murder was premeditated as Jaffer later confessed to police that he intended to kill Noor if she refused to accept his marriage proposal.

Zahir Jaffer was sentenced to death for the murder of Noor Mukadam by Islamabad session court in February 2022, while Jaffer's guards Iftikhar and Mohammad Jan were given ten years of imprisonment.

== Events leading up to the murder ==
According to Geo News, the timeline began on July 7, 2021, when Jaffer booked a one-way plane ticket to New York. Jaffer's departure was scheduled for 3:50 AM (PST) on July 19. On July 18, Jaffer made arrangements for a taxi to transport him to the Islamabad International Airport. That evening, Jaffer called Noor. Noor was at home, in Islamabad's Naval Anchorage neighbourhood. At 9:05 PM, Noor left her house and arrived at Jaffer's residence in Sector F-7/4 around 10 PM. At 2:15 AM on July 19, Jaffer came out of his house with a "barefooted" Noor and both got into the taxi. While on the way, Jaffer suddenly told the driver to turn back because they were too "late" and would "not be able to reach on time". The taxi dropped them at Jaffer's residence at 2:35 AM. According to the driver, "Noor was silent throughout the entire trip while Zahir continued to speak to her".

Almost 24 hours later, on July 20, Noor's father sent her three texts at 12:57 AM asking her where she was, but Noor did not respond. At 5:48 AM, her mother sent her messages, followed by calls from two family friends. Finally, at 10:43 AM, Noor sent a voice recording to her mother, details of which have not been disclosed to the public; it was her last message before her brutal murder. After she sent the message, Jaffer immediately called Noor's mother from his own phone and told her "Noor is not here at my house". From 11 AM to 7:30 PM, Noor is believed to have been tortured and murdered by Jaffer.

Noor tried to escape by jumping from the balcony but she was chased by Jaffer and the house security guard handed her back to Jaffer. The police are of the view that the murder could have been averted had the security guard informed the police. Noor's decapitated body showed signs of torture and stab wounds.

A leaked audiotape revealed that after the murder, Jaffer phoned his parents. Instead of calling the police, they called Therapy Works, a counselling and psychotherapy centre where Jaffer worked. Therapy Works staff arrived at the house, where one of their team members was injured upon encountering Jaffer.

== Police investigation ==
The suspect, Zahir Zakir Jaffer, is a dual Pakistani-American citizen and the son of a wealthy businessman, Zakir Jaffer, and Asmat Adamjee. Noor's father, Shaukat Mukadam, previously served as Pakistan's ambassador to South Korea and Kazakhstan. In addition to the suspect and victim, their families were also acquaintances.

Following the murder, a First Information Report was registered against Jaffer under Section 302 of the Pakistan Penal Code, and the suspect was arrested at the site of the crime. Four days later, Jaffer's parents and house servants were arrested on suspicion of complicity in the crime. Police investigated the role of Therapy Works too. Data recovered from Jaffer's phone indicated he had been involved in violence against women in the past. Jaffer's name was placed on the Provincial National Identification List (PNIL) and Exit Control List by the Pakistani government to prevent him from fleeing the country.

On August 15, 2021, police were able to match fingerprints and DNA confirming Jaffer's involvement in the murder.

== Judgement of the case ==
The decision of the case was announced on February 24, 2022 by the additional session judge Atta Rabbani. In the judgment, Zahir Jaffer was awarded a death sentence for murder, 25 years of imprisonment for rape, while watchman Muhammad Iftikhar and gardener Muhammad Jan, were sentenced to 10 years in prison for abetting. The court dismissed the position taken by the defense that Zahir was suffering from any mental disorder and could be acquitted on these grounds. Additionally, the court acquitted Zahir's parents, the cook Jamil, and the Therapy Works employees as the court could not find any evidence against them.

== Appeals ==
Several appeals were made after the initial judgement. On March 12, 2022, Noor's father would appeal to increase the sentences of the Zahir Jaffer, Muhammad Iftikhar and Muhammad Jan, as well as against the acquittal of Asmat Adem, Zakir Jaffar, Jamil, and the Therapy Works employees. While Zahir, Muhammad Iftikhar and Muhammad Jan appealed separately to reduce their sentences. The appeal was heard on September 14, 2022 by Islamabad High Court judges Justice Aamer Farooq and Justice Sardar Ijaz Ishaq. On March 13, 2023, the High Court judges upheld the original sentences of Zahir, Iftikhar, and Jan, while also increasing Zahir's life sentence for raping Noor to death sentence. The acquittals were upheld as well.

Zahir Jaffer would then challenge the High Court's verdict on April 12, 2023 in an appeal to the Supreme Court of Pakistan, raising 23 reasons.

on May 19 2025, Jaffer appeared in Supreme Court.

On May 20 2025 SC upholds Zahir Jaffer’s death sentence in Noor Mukadam murder case

== Reactions ==
The murder and its gruesome nature sparked strong condemnation and public outrage in Pakistan, and numerous calls to bring the perpetrator to justice. According to The Washington Post, "the name Noor Mukadam has ricocheted through Pakistani news and social media" and renewed focus on the country's plight in tackling cases of violence against women. Prime Minister Imran Khan directed the Islamabad Police to "make no concessions" while probing the murder and emphasised the delivery of justice. Celebrities from the film and music industries tweeted under the hashtag #JusticeForNoor to convey their sentiments. Overseas Pakistani communities also expressed their grief at the incident, holding vigils for Noor starting with a vigil in Toronto, which was organized by Zahra Haider. Some questioned whether Noor's plight would have ever reached mainstream media had she not been the daughter of a diplomat or belonged to a well-to-do family.

Amid public speculation that Zahir's family would try to wield its influence to stall the investigations, the Jaffer family released a statement to the media where it extended its condolences to the Mukadam family while adding that they "categorically condemn this atrocity and forever denounce Zahir and his actions". Zahir's maternal side, the Adamjee family, also issued a condemnation in which they expressed their grief and stated "We have not and will not support Zahir Jaffer in any form. We whole-heartedly and unequivocally support the law of the land taking its course. Justice for Noor must and will be served". Fatima Bhutto characterised Noor's murder as "a test for a system that too easily bends to power and influence", while also noting the countless women who were victims of violence but whose cases never were noticed because they were poor or unknown. The incident is one amongst a series of high-profile "honour killings" in recent years, beginning with the killing of Qandeel Baloch, following which Pakistan's parliament had enacted legislation aiming to counter such incidents. According to a representative of Aurat March, a campaign that promotes women's rights in the country, legislative changes are cosmetic in nature and ensure little difference on the ground "without an overhaul of the legal system to make it more gender-sensitive and survivor-centric, along with investment in shelters and welfare programs".

Clarifying its position on the issue while noting Jaffer's status as an American citizen, the U.S. embassy in Islamabad tweeted "In a foreign country, US citizens are subject to that country's laws. When Americans are arrested abroad, the Embassy can check on their well-being and provide a list of lawyers, but cannot provide legal advice, participate in court proceedings or effect their release".

== See also ==
- Honour killing in Pakistan:
  - Murder of Farzana Parveen
  - Samia Sarwar
  - Death of Samia Shahid
  - Ayman Udas
- Women's rights in Pakistan
