= Faryal Mehmood =

Pakistani-American actress

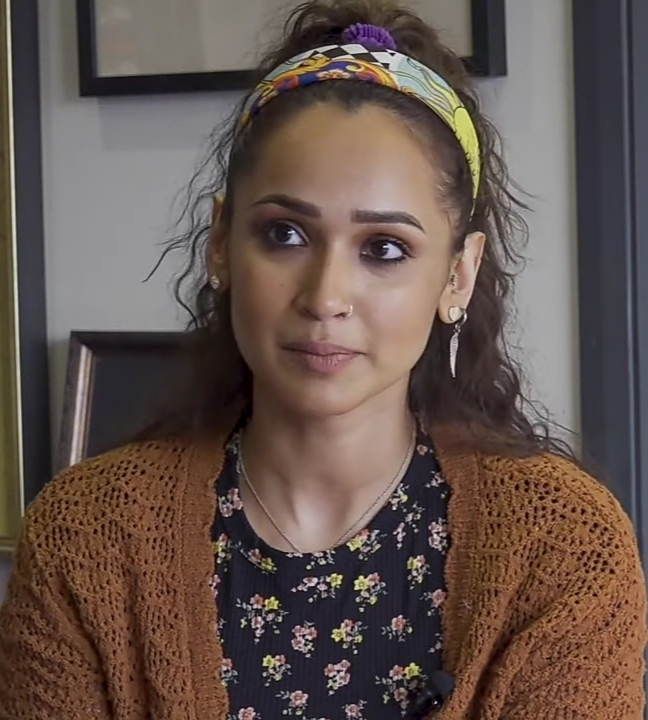
- Mehmood in 2024
- Born: New York City, United States
- Occupations: Actress, Model
- Years active: 2014–2024
- Height: 173 cm (5 ft 8 in)
- Spouse: Daniyal Raheal (m. 2020; div. 2021)

Faryal Mehmood is a Pakistani model and actress. She started her career in theater and made her television debut with Mein Bushra (2014–15), and received a nomination of Hum Award for Best Supporting Actress with the poetic romance Raqeeb Se (2021). She made her cinematic lead debut with Wakhri (2024), and gained praise for her performance.

Her mother is Pakistani singer Rohani Bano.

== Personal life ==
In late 2019, Mehmood shared in an interview with Samina Peerzada that she was a victim of sexual harassment and that her stepfather had molested her when she was a child. She is an avid dancer.

On 28 May 2020, Mehmood married Daniyal Raheal, son of veteran actor Simi Raheal. Rumours surrounding their alleged separation began to spread later that year; on 13 December 2020, Mehmood publicly rejected these claims, commenting that she would "like you guys to leave my marriage up to me and @daniyalraheal and focus on issues that are important in your own lives." Later in 2021, she confirmed her divorce stating that she is single again.

== Career ==
She appeared in 2017's series Mohabbat Tumse Nafrat Hai as an antagonist. The same year, she had her first major role in Laal Ishq written by Khalil-Ur-Rehman Qamar. In 2019, she made her web series debut as a jealous girlfriend of the protagonist in Wajahat Rauf's Enaaya. Shafiq ul Hassan of The Express Tribune found that she "manages to act quite well in a few scenes where she displays her anger and outrage".

For her portrayal of a straightforward and realist daughter in Kashif Nisar's directed and Bee Gul's written Raqeeb Se, she received a nomination of Hum Award for Best Supporting Actress.

After a two-year hiatus, she returned to acting in 2023 with a supporting role in Zaheer Uddin's Chikkar. She then played the titular role in Iram Parveen Bilal's Wakhri. Sara Danial of the Dawn Images found her portrayal as "nothing short of brilliance" and she "seamlessly encapsulating the nuances of her character, resonating with authenticity and depth". The film, released in January 2024, was inspired by the life of late social media sensation Qandeel Baloch. Her next appearance was a cameo in Umair Nasir Ali's Nayab, where she danced to the song "Shendi".

== Filmography ==
Key
†	Denotes film/serial that have not yet been released

=== Film ===
Year	Title	Role	Notes	Refs
2023	Chikkar	Neelam Shehzadi	Supporting role	
2024	Wakhri	Noor	Lead role	
2024	Nayab	Dancer	Cameo	

Key
†	Denotes films that have not yet been released

=== Television ===
Year	Title	Role	Notes	Refs
2014–15	Mein Bushra	Sania		
2015	Farwa Ki ABC	Aasma Ghaznavi		
2015	Khuda Dekh Raha Hai	Sana Mehmood		
2015	Bheegi Palkein	Fariha		
2016	Mera Yaar Miladay	Mehru		
2016	Aap Ke Liye	Shaheer's wife		
2016	Teri Chah Mein	Amber		
2016	Babul Ki Duaen Leti Ja	Nirma		
2016	Bheegi Palkein	Ifra		
2017	Mohabbat Tumse Nafrat Hai	Jiya		
2017	Laal Ishq	Mahi		
2017	Hiddat	Seema		
2017	Yeh Ishq Hai	Khoobsurat	Episode "Khoobsurat"	
2017	Kitni Girhain Baaki Hain (season 2)	Natasha	Episode 36	
2018	Babban Khala Ki Betiyann	Bisma aka Baby		
2018	Ek Pal Ka Malaal	Kiran		
2018	Kabhi Band Kabhi Baja		Episode 2	
2018	Tum Se Hi Talluq Hai	Rahma		
2018	Baba Jani	Mehwish		
2018	Siskiyaan	Mumtaz		
2019	Enaaya	Arya	Web series	
2019	Ramz-e-Ishq	Sadia		
2019	Dolly Darling	Pinky		
2019	Daasi	Aaliyah		
2019	Aey Zindagi	Farah		
2020	Gustakh	Muntaha		
2021	Raqeeb Se	Insha		
2026	Mitti De Baway	Sitara		

== Awards and nominations ==
Year	Awards	Category	Work	Result	Refs
2022	Hum Awards	Hum Award for Best Supporting Actress	Raqeeb Se	Nominated	
