= The Sensational Life & Death of Qandeel Baloch =

- Author: Sanam Maher
- Language: English
- Genre: Non-fiction
- Publisher: Rupa & Co.
- Publication date: 1 May 2018
- Publication place: Pakistan
- Media type: Print
- Pages: 272 pp (first edition, hardback)
- ISBN: 978-93-86021-94-6 (first edition, hardback)

The Sensational Life & Death of Qandeel Baloch is a non-fiction book written by Pakistani journalist Sanam Maher about the life of Qandeel Baloch. The biography was released on 10 May 2018 and was published by Rupa & Co.

== Adaptation ==
On 18 May 2022, it reported that Bollywood producer Alankrita Shrivastava who also produced Bombay Begums along with Vikas Sharma purchased the rights of the book to adapt it into a film.

== Reception ==
Firstpost gave a positive review for The Sensational Life & Death of Qandeel Baloch, calling it "a brilliant new book" which "take us to the multiple worlds and lives that Fauzia Waseem lived before and after she became Qandeel Baloch."

DAWN described the book as "meticulously researched" which "presents an engaging social history of Pakistan itself".

The News International review said "This is a must-read book because it immortalizes Qandeel Baloch in the only way she should be: a rebel, a mystery, a beautiful one at that."

The book was featured in HuffPost’s most anticipated books of 2017 in the "non-fiction" category.
