= Yousuf Bashir Qureshi =

Pakistani fashion designer, artist and actor

Yousuf Bashir Qureshi یوسف بشیر قریشی
- Born: 2 March 1971 (age 55); Karachi, Pakistan
- Other name: YBQ
- Education: University of Nebraska–Lincoln
- Label: YBQDS
- Website: www.ybqds.com

Yousuf Bashir Qureshi (Note: Urdu: یوسف بشیر قریشی, pronounced [ˈjuː.sʊf bəˈʃiːr qʊˈreː.ʃi]) (born 2 March 1971), commonly known as YBQ, is a Pakistani fashion designer, artist, actor, musician, poet and farmer. His atelier and art and design studios are housed in former warehouses known as the Commune Artist Colony, located in Karachi's Railway Quarters.

== Early life ==
Yousuf Bashir Qureshi was born on 2 March 1971 in Karachi. As a child, he attended Pakistan Steel Cadet College, a boarding school on the outskirts of Karachi. His family has a long-standing history in farming, with their ancestral home in Hasan Abdal. Through his mother, Abida Bashir, he has familial ties to Ajmer.

== Career ==
=== Fashion and art ===
After completing his schooling, Qureshi pursued higher education in the United States, graduating from the University of Nebraska–Lincoln with a degree in food science. Alongside his studies, he began ballet and developed an interest in fashion, art and photography. According to a profile published by ARY News, his photographic work has appeared in publications including Vogue and National Geographic.

He briefly opened a café in Lincoln, Nebraska, before relocating in 1997 to Santa Monica, California, where he has said he designed costumes for Hollywood productions. During this period he has said he worked for Madonna, Sheryl Crow and Alanis Morissette, and contributed to the costume design for The Matrix.

In 2004, Qureshi returned to Pakistan, establishing his studio in former family-owned warehouses in Karachi. His return was marked by two serious setbacks. Four days after arriving from the United States, armed robbers broke into his home; he has said police initially delayed registering a First Information Report because of his years spent abroad. He returned from Hajj on 29 December 2007, two days after the assassination of Benazir Bhutto, and found that his house had been burned down amid the unrest that followed. He has said it took him two years to recover before he was able to launch his fashion brand.

Qureshi's first designer clothing was a blend of traditional South Asian styles with his own touch. His fashion work is inspired by Sufi mysticism. Qureshi has taught courses in fashion design at the Indus Valley School of Art and Architecture. He has also worked with the Pakistan Design Council in Lahore. In addition to his artistic work, he manages the family farm in Mirpur Sakro.

=== Music and poetry ===
Qureshi performs music occasionally and has recorded songs. In 2017, he collaborated with singer Natasha Baig on a Sufi song. He had a minor role in Shehzad Roy's music video for the song "Jind Jaan". He has also engaged in poetry performance, including in Dubai.

=== Acting ===
Qureshi has credited actor Saba Hameed with helping refine his acting craft, and has said director Nadeem Baig persuaded him to pursue television professionally. He made a supporting appearance in the film Senti Aur Mental in 2016, though the production was ultimately left unfinished. From that point, he began making occasional appearances in films and television series.

== Personal life ==
Qureshi has described fear as the greatest obstacle to personal growth, arguing that people are conditioned from childhood to live with fear, which prevents them from reaching their full potential. He has said children should be raised "with love and trust, not fear".

Qureshi has said that after turning 40 he made a conscious decision to stop speaking negatively about others and to let go of expectations of other people. He has also spoken against fear, guilt and greed as forces he believes limit human potential, and has rejected the idea that life should be driven by competition, saying instead that people should aim to achieve things together. He has said he begins each morning by sending a short message to close friends and family to remind them they are loved.

Qureshi views marriage as a form of companionship rather than partnership, saying that "a companion stays with you even beyond death" and that it is "about total acceptance and about giving, not taking".

== Filmography ==
=== Television series ===
Year	Title	Role	Network	Notes
2023	Neem	Shah Alam "Baba Jan"	Hum TV	
2023	Kuch Ankahi	Mr. Motiwala	ARY Digital	
2024	Noor Jahan	Mukhtar Shah	ARY Digital	
2024	Kabhi Main Kabhi Tum	Mansoor Ali Khan	ARY Digital	
2024	Duniyapur	Aurangzeb Adam	Green Entertainment	
2025	Paradise	Jamshed	Express Entertainment	
2025	Sher	Shah Zaman	ARY Digital	
2025	Biryani	Baba Sain	ARY Digital	
2026	Raja London Ka	Munawwar Mirza	Express TV	
2026	Aik Mohabbat Aur	Fuki	Green Entertainment	
2026	Muhafiz	Aijaz	Geo Entertainment	
2026	Nashtar	Behram Ali Khan	Geo Entertainment	

=== Film ===
Year	Title	Role	Notes
2017	Senti Aur Mental	Yousuf Bashir Qureshi	Unfinished
2019	Parey Hut Love	Mahmud	
