= Kohistan honour killing =

Honour-killing case

2012 Kohistan honour killing
- Screencap of the mobile video showing the girls involved: Bazeegha, Sereen Jaan, Begum Jaan and Amina
- Date: May 2012
- Venue: Peach Bela, Palas Valley
- Location: Kohistan, Khyber Pakhtunkhwa, Pakistan
- Type: Honour killing
- First reporter: Afzal Kohistani
- Deaths: 3 (lowest confirmed estimate)
- Convictions: Mohammad Umar Khan, Saeer and Sabir
- Sentence: Life imprisonment (25 years)

In May 2012, an honour killing took place in Palas Valley, Kohistan, Pakistan. It involved the killing of up to five girls, of whom a video emerged on the Internet. The video featured a boy dancing while four girls clapped and sang along. It is claimed that when the footage became public, a tribal jirga was held shortly afterwards where it was decided that the participants as well as the boy who filmed the video should be killed.

Afzal Kohistani, the elder brother of the two boys involved in the video, went against local tribal tradition and brought the case to national attention; first asking for the participants' protection and subsequently claiming that the girls in the video had already been murdered. Kohistani campaigned for over seven years to keep the case in the public eye until he was murdered in March 2019.

In September 2019, three men were convicted of murdering three of the girls from the video and were sentenced to life imprisonment; they were acquitted in October 2023. The status of the fourth and fifth girl remains unconfirmed.

== Events ==
=== Video ===
Four girls − Bazeegha, Sereenjaan, Begumjaan and Amina − are seen clapping and singing; a fifth girl, Shaheen, is also present but does not appear in the video. In a separate shot, a man is seen dancing, while a second man records both him and the girls. The video was reportedly filmed at a wedding celebration in the remote and strictly conservative Kohistan region, where cultural traditions are enforced by tribal jirgas in the absence of a capable law enforcement system. In May 2012, the video was leaked online and as the girls and men were from different tribes, a jirga was convened by local tribesmen where it was decided that the participants should be killed, as intermingling of young females with males is strictly forbidden in the conservative cultural traditions of the Kohistani society.

=== Investigations and legal rulings ===
The incident reached national media in June 2012 when Afzal Kohistani, the elder brother of the boys connected to the video, alleged that the girls had been killed on the orders of the Azadkhel tribe jirga. Officials from the area denied that this had taken place and claimed that the girls were alive. The case was disposed of after rights activists and government officials made two trips to the remote village to meet the girls, as ordered by the Supreme Court of Pakistan, and initially confirmed that at least four of the girls were alive. Dr Farzana Bari, a woman's rights activist who made both trips to meet the girls, initially agreed with the conclusions reached but then lodged her dissent.

In response to the closure of the case, Afzal Kohistani asserted that imposters had been presented to the investigation team and that the real girls were dead. He filed an application to reopen the case which resulted in three of his brothers being shot dead.

On 8 February 2014, a former member of the Provincial Assembly of Khyber Pakhtunkhwa from Kohistan, publicly claimed that the four girls seen in the video had been murdered and this prompted Afzal Kohistani to file another petition for the girls to be produced in court. After this was rejected, he took it to the Supreme Court where, in November 2016, another commission was ordered. The defence lawyer argued that the girls couldn't be brought before the commission because of local tribal restrictions making it a matter of honour and shame. That argument was rejected by Justice Ejaz Afzal and sessions judge, Shoaib Khan, and other officials, were dispatched to meet the girls. Four girls duly appeared before them and inconsistences were noted around the age of the girls produced and those who appeared in the video five years prior.

In relation to Amina, the report submitted by the commission to the Supreme court stated:

By appearance, she was about 14/15 years old. Reportedly, the video was shot back in the year 2010 and [it] surfaced [on the internet] in 2012. If we subtract the six years from [Amina’s] age, her age at the time of video shooting would be between 8/9 years whereas girls visible in the [video]… look to be aged between 20/22 years back in the year 2010.

Similar discrepancies were found in each case.

Farzana Bari made a fresh statement to the court reiterating her earlier concerns that the girls seen in the video were not those who had been presented before the commission. She stated:

"Photos of the girls taken during the commission session were given to a Reuters' journalist, Katharine Houreld, who got the matching done through a renowned independent British agency 'Digital Barriers'. It was found in the said report that the photos of the girls, who were made to appear before the commission, did not match the images of the girls appearing in the said video."

In August 2018, on the order of the Supreme Court, the Kohistan police registered a first information report for the alleged honour killing of the five girls connected to the video. In December 2018, the investigation found that two out of five victims were reportedly alive and that three of the girls - Siran Jaan, Begum Jaan and Bazeegha - had, indeed, been killed.

== Afzal Kohistani ==
Afzal Kohistani (murdered 6 March 2019), the eldest brother of the men in the video

Afzal Kohistani, a Salehkhel tribesman from the Kolai-Palas District, was one of eight children. The family lived comfortably and were well respected within the village community of Gadaar. At various times, Afzal ran a tailoring shop, clerked for a lawyer and traded bee honey, and studied law in his free time.

In 2010, he was living in Mansehra with his wife and two of his younger brothers, Bin Yasir and Gul Nazar. Around this time, Yasir and Nazar returned to the family village of Gadaar, which is where the video was later filmed. When the video went viral Yasir and Nazar were arrested; two of their brothers and other families from the Salehkhel tribe left Gadaar and moved to Allai, where they'd been offered protection from the Azadkhel tribe, to whom the girls in the video belonged.

As opposed to following the tribal tradition, Afzal tried to prevent the sentence of the jirga from being carried out. When that failed he went to the media and repeatedly raised litigation in order to prove that the murders had taken place. As a result, three of Afzal's brothers, who stayed behind in Gadaar, were murdered in January 2013 and Afzal's house was firebombed.

On 6 March 2019, he was shot dead in Abbottabad, Khyber Pakhtunkhwa.

== Convictions ==
In January 2014, six men from the Azadkhel tribe were convicted of murdering Afzal Kohistani's three brothers. One was sentenced to death and the five others were sentenced to 25 years in prison; all were relatives of the girls in the video. Six other men, including the jirga chief who allegedly ordered the initial murders, were acquitted. In 2017, the convictions of the six men were overturned by the high court.

In September 2019, the father of Bazeegha, the father of Sereen Jaan and the brother of Begum Jaan, were convicted of murder and sentenced to life in prison. Five other men were acquitted. The three men were later released in October 2023.

== See also ==
- Honour killing in Pakistan:

- Qandeel Baloch
- Stoning of Farzana Parveen
- Samia Sarwar
- Death of Samia Shahid
- Ayman Udas
