= Abid Merchant =

Pakistani film producer

- Born: Karachi, Pakistan
- Occupation: Film producer
- Years active: 2013–present
- Notable work: I'll Meet You There (film)

Abid Aziz Merchant is a Pakistani film producer and arts administrator based in Karachi.

== Career ==
After a career of twenty-one years in banking, Merchant founded Sanat Initiative in 2014, a contemporary visual art space that has become a significant platform for Pakistani art locally and internationally. Sanat Initiative operates as an exhibition space, publisher, and project platform with a focus on emerging visual artists in Pakistan. In 2019 it relocated from its original premises in Clifton to the Commune Artist Colony, where it occupies over 6,000 square feet of exhibition space. The initiative programmes regular exhibitions, artist residencies, and curatorial projects.

== Film producer ==
Merchant began producing films under the banner of Sanat Initiative in 2018. His first feature, I'll Meet You There (film), filmed in New York City, was nominated for the Grand Jury Award at SXSW 2020. He subsequently produced the short film 1978, which premiered at the Locarno Film Festival in 2020, and Mulaqat (Sandstorm), which screened at the Venice Film Festival in 2021 and the Sundance Film Festival in 2022.

In 2023 he co-produced the Kazakh feature Madina, an official selection at the Tokyo International Film Festival, and produced Wakhri (One of a Kind), which screened at the Red Sea International Film Festival the same year.

His projects in development have been selected for a number of international development programmes, including Locarno Open Doors (2018), Cinéfondation L'Atelier at the Festival de Cannes (2019), Biennale College Cinema at the Venice Biennale (2021), Produire au Sud (2021), and La Fabrique Cinéma de l'Institut Français (2022).
