= I'll Meet You There =

I'll Meet You There may refer to:

- I'll Meet You There (film), a 2020 American drama film
- "I'll Meet You There", a Rebecca Ferguson song from the album Superwoman
- "I'll Meet You There", an Owl City song from the album Maybe I'm Dreaming
