= Nashtar =

2026 Pakistani television series

- Genre: Romance
- Written by: Maha Malik
- Directed by: Siraj-ul-Haque
- Starring: Danish Taimoor; Anmol Baloch
- Country of origin: Pakistan
- Original language: Urdu
- No. of episodes: 35

Production
- Producers: Abdullah Kadwani; Asad Qureshu
- Production locations: Karachi, Pakistan
- Camera setup: Multi-camera setup
- Running time: 40 minutes
- Production company: 7th Sky Entertainment

Original release
- Network: Geo Entertainment
- Release: August 21, 2026 – present

Nashtar is a 2026 Pakistani romantic drama series that premiered on Geo Entertainment on 21 August 2026. It is produced by Abdullah Kadwani and Asad Qureshi under 7th Sky Entertainment. It stars Danish Taimoor and Anmol Baloch. The series revolves around Shah Dawood, whose encounter with Bareera, an independent young woman, challenges his dominating nature and sets the stage for an unexpected relationship.

== Plot ==
At Shah Dawood's birthday celebration, tensions rise between Tamseel and Arbaz when she insists that he is nothing more than a friend, leading to a bitter fallout between them. Bareera refuses to accept an award from Shah Dawood after discovering that a worker was beaten and humiliated in his home. She later apologises to Shah Dawood, only to become furious when he asks her out on a date. Shah Dawood blames Bareera for damaging his reputation and threatens to make her pay. After reporters humiliate him, he goes for a drive and ends up chasing Bareera along the highway. Meanwhile, Tamseel lures Arbaz into a trap before calling Shah Dawood and pretending to be in distress. Bareera's father discovers Shah Dawood's harassment and accepts Rafay's marriage proposal. At the engagement, Shah Dawood's gifts make Bareera's association with him appear inappropriate to her future in-laws. Bareera and Rafay plan to marry and move abroad, but first record videos exposing Shah Dawood. He discovers their plans, while Bareera's father begs him to forgive her, but he refuses. With Bareera's nikkah only minutes away, her brother is kidnapped. Despite the situation, the ceremony begins, but Shah Dawood arrives and interrupts it. Following the death of Shah Dawood's father, the funeral procession begins, and Tamseel is shocked to discover that Shah Dawood and Bareera are married. Tamseel visits Bareera and warns her that she is only a pawn in Shah Dawood's hands, advising her to escape while she still can. Bareera meets Rafay for the last time and asks him to move on, while Tamseel confronts Shah Dawood after learning about his secret marriage. Shah Dawood later receives news that Bareera is alive and sets out to investigate the truth.

== Cast ==
- Danish Taimoor as Shah Dawood
- Anmol Baloch as Bareera Aijaz
- Naeema Butt as Tamseel
- Usmaan Peerzada as Dastoor Ali Khan
- Haroon Shahid as Arbaz
- Yousuf Bashir Qureshi as Behram Ali Khan
- Shahnawaz Zaidi as Professor Aijaz
- Mehmood Aslam as Mansab Ali Khan
- Nida Mumtaz as Mansha
- Ali Dayyan Walji as Rafay
- Muhammad Faizan Sheikh as Kabir
- Ramsha Salahuddin as Neha
- Syed Afzal Ali as Suleman
- Fatima Gohar as Hameeda Khanam
- Ayesha Gul as Gul Bano
- Laiba Rehman Butt as Seerat
- Zarafshan Amir as Iffat
- Annie Zaidi as Sanobar
- Muhammad Asad Gojar as Rustam
- Talia Jan as Sundas

== Music ==
The series' OST is composed and sung by Shani Arshad, with lyrics co-written by Shani Arshad and SK Khalish.
