= Abdul Qawi =

Pakistani cleric and politician

- عبدالقوی
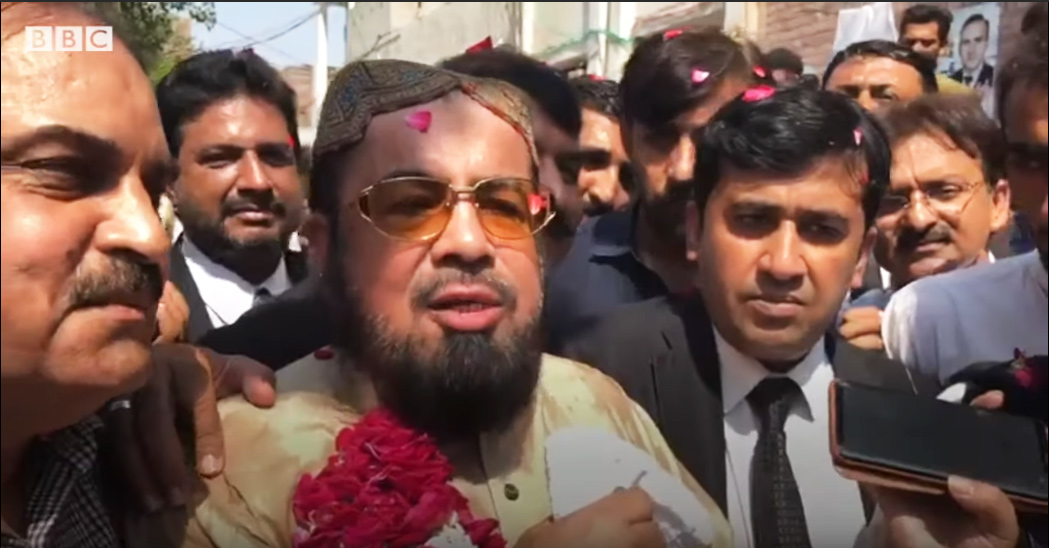
- Mufti Abdul Qawi (third from left), 2019
- Born: October 26, 1957 (age 69)

Abdul Qawi is an Islamic cleric and controversial personality from Multan, Punjab, Pakistan. He joined the Pakistan Tehreek-e-Insaf (PTI) political party in 2013, but was later expelled from the party. He is a former president of religious affairs of the Pakistan Tehreek-e-Insaf party in Punjab.

== Early life and education ==
Qawi was born on 26 October 1957. He received his early Islamic education at home. He went to Jamia Qasim Ul Uloom and Jamia Khairul Madaris in Multan for higher education. After graduation, he enrolled in the Qadiani course at the University of Agriculture, Faisalabad for 5 months. After completion, he went to the Islamic University of Madinah for the next stage.

== Controversy ==
=== Suspension from Pakistan Tehreek-e-Insaf ===
Mufti Qawi's basic membership was suspended and he was later expelled from the Pakistan Tehreek-e-Insaf due to the controversy surrounding the selfies he posed for with the late model Qandeel Baloch (1990–2016). Mufti Qawi's first encounter with Qandeel was through television where Qawi was invited as preacher to guide Qandeel in the Islamic way about her acts on social media. In same program, Qawi requested Qandeel Baloch for a meeting. After some time, Qandeel visited his house and met him personally. After this, Qandeel uploaded a video which was recorded in hotel room during their meeting, in which Qandeel was sitting very close to Qawi. She had an arm over his shoulder and revealed that he was smoking during Ramadan. After the video went viral, Qawi was criticized for his behavior, which eventually led to his ousting from his prominent position at PTI.

=== Suspension from Ruet-e-hilal committee ===
On 22 June 2016, Mufti Qawi was suspended from the Ruet-e-Hilal Committee due to his aforementioned meeting with the late model Qandeel Baloch.

=== Nomination in model Qandeel Baloch’s murder case ===
Mufti Abdul Qawi's name has been nominated in social media activist and model Qandeel Baloch's murder case. His name was mentioned in the First information report (FIR) on application of Qandeel's father Azeem. but was later released. He was already being investigated by Multan police.

=== 'Halal' alcohol controversy ===
In May on alcohol permissibility when he said that drink with less than 40% alcohol is halal. Mufti Naeem, A prominent cleric and ex-chief of Jamia Binoria Karachi, lashed out at Mufti Qawi, described him as a man with a notorious reputation and dismissed his views as not in line with the views of scholars of any other sect.

=== Harassment Allegations ===
In January 2021, Hareem Shah claimed that she and her cousin beat up Mufti Abdul Qawi over ‘dirty’, ‘vulgar’ conversation and for “physically harassing” them. The title of 'Mufti' was later withdrawn from Abdul Qawi after this incident by his uncle Maulana Abdul Wahid.

== Literary contributions ==
- Adbul Qawi (2005). Miftahu-Al-Nijah- مفتاح النجاح (in Urdu). Vol. 3. Maktaba Rehmania Lahore.

According to Qawi, this book was part of the curriculum of Dars-i-Nizami under the Wifaq-ul-Madaris al-Arabia.
