= Iqbal Haider =

Pakistani politician and. Senator (1945-2012)

Iqbal Haider (Urdu: اقبال حیدر; 14 January 1945 – 11 November 2012) was a Senior Advocate of the Supreme Court of Pakistan and the co-chairperson of the Human Rights Commission of Pakistan ("HRCP"). He was also a Senator, Federal Minister for Law, Justice and Parliamentary Affairs from November 1993 to December 1994, Pakistan's first Federal Minister for Human Rights and Attorney General.

== Life and education ==
Haider was born on 14 January 1945 in Agra in pre-partition India (during the British Raj). He migrated to Pakistan with his family and got his early education in Karachi.

He earned a Bachelor's degree in Commerce from the Government College of Commerce & Economics, Karachi in 1964, and an LLB from the Punjab University Law College, Lahore in 1966, where he was Secretary of the Debating Society, Vice-chairman of the Cultural Society of the Punjab University Students Union. He also worked for the "Al-Meezan" magazine of PULC and was a member of Law College's debating society. In 1967, Haider was admitted to the Honourable Society of Lincoln's Inn, where he became the vice-president of the Students Union of Lincoln's Inn.

Haider died peacefully due to Coronary respiratory failure on 11 November 2012 in a Karachi hospital.

== Professional career ==
Haider was first enrolled as an advocate for the subordinate courts in June 1967. He has practiced law in different courts of the country, including the High Courts, since 1972, and in the Supreme Court of Pakistan since 1978. He has been member of the Executive Board/Committees of a number of organisations, including Pakistan Institute of International Affairs and the Sindh Red Crescent Society, and a Trustee of the Shaheed Zulfiqar Ali Bhutto Sports Foundation. He was also a member of the Bar Associations of the Sindh and Lahore High Courts.

== Political career ==
Haider has, since early in his career, been an outspoken critic of the involvement of the Army in the political affairs of Pakistan. He was a founding member of the Movement for Restoration of Democracy ("MRD") and one of the main organizers of its Mass Movement, launched in 1983, for removal of Martial Law and Restoration of Democracy. He was the Central Acting Convener, Acting Central Secretary General and Acting Joint Secretary of the MRD. From 1981 to 1986, he was detained at least ten times by the Martial Law authorities.

Haider was President of the Karachi Division of Qaumi Mahaz-e-Azadi (QMA) from 1977 to 1982, and Secretary General of QMA from 1983 to 1988.

Haider later joined the Pakistan Peoples Party (PPP), where he was appointed the Advisor to the Chief Minister Sindh from January 1989 to February 1990. He was the President of the PPP Karachi Division, vice-president of PPP Sindh, and member of the Central Executive Committee of the PPP. On 22 March 2005, Haider resigned from the PPP to pursue his human rights interests.

== Human rights ==
Haider's passion was human rights. He has done work for victims of honour killing (e.g. Samia Sarwar), karo-kari, bonded labour, and missing persons, amongst others. He founded the Human Rights Ministry during the second tenure of Shaheed Benazir Bhutto and became the first Human Rights minister of Pakistan. He sat in the Senate Committee on Human Rights, was one of the founding members of the HRCP, and continued to pursue human rights causes in Pakistan. He drafted and tabled the first ever bill on Honour Killing.

His more recent activities included launching a strong campaign against the government and Inter-Services Intelligence (ISI) in relation to missing persons and formation of 'The Forum for Secular Pakistan' to counter the narrative of religious and sectarian hate and violence.

== Sources ==
- http://www.hrcp-web.org/new_chairperson.cfm
- http://www.dailytimes.com.pk/default.asp?page=story_21-3-2005_pg7_5
- http://www.senate.gov.pk/ShowMemberDetail.asp?MemberCode=319&CatCode=0&CatName=
- https://web.archive.org/web/20060306041610/http://www.dawn.com/2005/03/22/local19.htm
