= Wakhri =

2023 Pakistani film by Iram Parveen

- Theatrical release poster
- Directed by: Iram Parveen Bilal
- Produced by: Abid Aziz Merchant; Apoorva Bakshi; Iram Parveen Bilal
- Starring: Faryal Mehmood
- Cinematography: Ludovica Isidori
- Edited by: Aarti Bajaj
- Music by: Abdullah Siddiqui
- Production companies: Awedacious Originals; Parveen Shah Productions; Sanat Initiative
- Distributed by: Mandiviwala Entertainment
- Release dates: 3 December 2023 (Red Sea); 5 January 2024 (Pakistan)
- Country: Pakistan
- Language: Urdu

Wakhri - One of a Kind is a 2023 Pakistani drama film directed by Iram Parveen Bilal who co-produced it as well, and starring Faryal Mehmood in her debut film lead as a widowed school teacher who goes viral on social media. The film is inspired by the late social media celebrity Qandeel Baloch, who was murdered in 2016. The film had its world premiere at the Red Sea International Film Festival on 3 December 2023. It was later theatrically released on 5 January 2024 nationwide.

== Premise ==
A school teacher unexpectedly goes viral after sharing her unfiltered views on social media. As her sudden fame grows, she finds herself confronting outdated societal norms and hidden identities.

== Cast ==
- Faryal Mehmood
- Gulshan Majeed
- Saleem Mairaj
- Bakhtawar Mazhar
- Sohail Sameer
- Akbar Islam
- Shees Sajjad Gul
- Tooba Siddiqui

== Release ==
Wakhri had its world premiere at Red Sea International Film Festival on 3 December 2024. It was screened at 2024 South by Southwest Film & TV Festival on 8 March 2024 in Narrative Spotlight. It had its Ohio Premiere at the Cleveland International Film Festival on 9 April 2024. It was also selected as the opening film at the Tasveer Film Festival.

It is scheduled for release in French cinemas in October 2026 through Salon Indien, a traveling film society devoted to South Asian women filmmakers. It will also be released in United Kingdom and Ireland as part of Channel 4's 2026 South Asian Film Season and is available to stream free on the platform, in Australia by SBS and by Filmicca in Brazil in 2026 autumn.

== Production ==
In December 2022, it reported that Pakistani-USA director Iram Parveen Bilal has wrapped the principal photography of her upcoming film which is inspired by Qandeel Baloch. Faryal Mehmood was selected to portray the title character who was finalised after giving an audition and it took over two months to confirm her. While talking about her casting, Bilal stated about her social media trolling, which is also severely faced by the protagonist in the film. Mehmood dedicates the film to her ex-husband Daniyal Raheal. The film was edited by Aarti Bajaj and the production was designed by Kanwal Khoosat.

The film's trailer was released on 7 November 2023. The film had its world premiere at the Red Sea International Film Festival in December 2023. On 4 December 2023, the film was cleared by Central Board of Film Censors for a nationwide release. The film was distributed by Mandiviwalla Entertainment, and released on 5 January 2024 in Pakistan.

== Soundtrack ==
Wakhri

Soundtrack album by Various artists
- Released: 20 December 2023
- Length: 11:55
- Producer: Abdullah Siddiqui
External audio
- Wakhri (Original Soundtrack) playlist on YouTube

The Wakhri (Original Soundtrack) has been produced by Abdullah Siddiqui and it consists of four tracks.

Wakhri (Original Soundtrack)
No.	Title	Singer(s)	Length
1.	"Baaghi"	Eva B	2:38
2.	"Wakhri Dhamaal"	Risham Faiz Bhutta, Ali Sethi	3:06
3.	"You Don't Give a Haqq"	Meesha Shafi	2:38
4.	"Matlabi" (Wakhri Version)	Natasha Noorani	3:33
Total length:			11:55

== Reception ==
=== Critical reception ===
In a review by Trending In Social, Bilal's directorial brilliance was praised by the author who wrote, "Credit for the film's success also goes to director Iram Parveen Bilal, who skillfully navigates the blend of masala-style and art-house elements. Bilal's direction brings out the activist streak in the second half, adding layers to the narrative and elevating the film beyond conventional storytelling." The review also highlighted Faryal Mehmood's "spectacular performance," stating that her "portrayal of a single mother navigating the challenges of societal norms is both poignant and powerful," and concluded that the film "boldly breaks the mold of Pakistani cinema by addressing a controversial theme with fearlessness and authenticity."

Sara Danial of Dawn Images heavily praised Mehmood's performance and wrote, "Mehmood's portrayal of Noor is nothing short of brilliance, seamlessly encapsulating the nuances of her character, resonating with authenticity and depth." However, the Dawn (The Icon) review by Mohammad Kamran Jawaid offered a more critical perspective, writing that "Wakhri is a brazen, 'statement' film against close-minded conservatism and that is its precise problem as well." The review noted the film's lack of subtlety, stating that "as far as words go, 'subtle' — both the word and the execution — is not a part of the film's vocabulary; in its place resides the word 'power'."

The News International (You! magazine) highlighted the film's significance, noting it was the "first time in the film history of Pakistan where a woman is playing a drag queen." In an interview, director Iram Parveen Bilal explained the inspiration behind the film, stating, "Well-behaved women seldom make history. She was that quote personified... Most people only learned about her life two weeks before she was killed, and not being able to forget about her made me pay attention to what it was about her that was so personal to her." A separate review in The News International (TNS) gave the film 3 stars, praising its "beautiful" visuals and calling the character "potentially iconic," but criticised the film for being "far too ambitious," noting that "in all the noise of every issue raised, Wakhri loses her voice."

The Austin Chronicle (SXSW review) praised the film's courage, writing that "despite the script's wobbles, Bilal's efforts to boldly bring this feminist and queer story to a larger audience deserve accolades." The review also noted that the film "screened for seven weeks in most Pakistani theaters, both tremendous markers of success in their own right."

PakistaniCinema.Net was highly critical, stating that "Faryal Mehmood's effortless performance is what makes 'Wakhri' work," but that "she can't save this film from a disjointed screenplay and amateurish direction." The review criticised the film for committing "the cardinal sin of being boring" and noted that the screenplay "suffers from a lack of detail which prevents the characters in the film from being fully fleshed out."

== Accolades ==
Year	Award / Film Festival	Category	Recipient(s)	Result	Ref.
2024	Yellowstone International Film Festival (YIFF)	Best Director – Feature Film	Iram Parveen Bilal	Won	

== See also ==
- List of Pakistani films of 2023
