= Sanam Maher =

Pakistani journalist

- Occupations: Journalist; author
- Notable work: The sensational life of Qandeel Baloch
- Website: sanammaher.com

Sanam Maher is a Pakistani journalist and feminist. She is known for her book The sensational life of Qandeel Baloch which is based on the life of the late model Qandeel Baloch.

== Biography ==
Maher is one of five daughters born to a maxillofacial surgeon mother.

Sanam is a journalist based in Karachi who has contributed to Express Tribune, Dawn, Al-Jazeera, The New York Times, BuzzFeed, The Guardian, The Scroll and Roads and Kingdoms. Sanam has written articles on the culture of Pakistan, business politics, women and minority rights for more than ten years. For a short time, Sanam worked on the television, covering the conflict in the region of Khyber Pakhtunkhwa. She then worked as an editor in Herald and the national desk at The Express Tribune and The New York Times. Since 2015, she has worked as a freelance journalist.

Sanam is also the author of the book The Sensational Life of Qandeel Baloch, which was her first book. "A Woman Like Her" was released in 2019, which is also based on Qandeel Baloch. Her first book was shortlisted for the Shakti Bhatt First Book Prize and the Indian book prize award.

In 2018, Sanam worked on a book project with BBOD Pakistan and Sharmeen Obaid-Chinoy's SOC Outreach. “Knowledge is Bulletproof” is a book on the life of Shazia Ramzan and Kainat Riaz, the two girls who were shot at with Malala Yousufzai in 2012. In August 2018, ‘Knowledge is Bulletproof’ won 1 Gold, 5 Silver, and 7 Bronze awards at Asia's biggest award show, AD Stars.

In 2020, Sanam along with Fatima Bhutto started an initiative called Stay Home, Stay Reading. The initiative is a virtual reading fair that allowed authors to promote their work by reading excerpts of their work through videos. The initiative was featured in national and international news.

== Books ==
- The Sensational life of Qandeel Baloch (2018)
- A Woman Like Her (2019)
