= Shah Sadar Din =

- Union council and town
- Location in Pakistan
- Coordinates: 30°16′44″N 70°43′49″E
- Country: Pakistan
- Province: Punjab
- District: Dera Ghazi Khan District
- Elevation: 381 ft (116 m)
- Time zone: UTC+5 (PST)
  - Summer (DST): +6

Shah Sadar Din is a town and union council in the Dera Ghazi Khan District of Punjab province, Pakistan. It is located at 30°16'44N 70°43'49E and has an altitude of 116 meters (383 feet). The village is situated 240 miles south of Islamabad.

Due to its location near the Indus River, agriculture is the main occupation in this area. Wheat, rice, and cotton are the most important crops. South Punjab, located in the central region of Pakistan, is characterized by flat land filled with mango trees, date palms, sugar cane, Sufi shrines, and mud-brick villages.

In the education sector, the Shah Sadar Din Institute of Medical Sciences, located on Shiekhani Road near RHC Shah Sadar Din, focuses on the medical field.

Allama Iqbal Model School offers education from PG to FSc level.

Allama Iqbal Computer College provides computer courses as well as a freelancing academy.

Spark Academy is another educational institution in the area.

== Main tribes ==
The majority of tribes living in Shah Sadar Din are Dasti Baloch, Lashari Baloch, Syed, Khosa Baloch, Hutwani Baloch and Jarwar. It is one of the richest towns and union councils in Dera Ghazi Khan. Most of the residents work and live abroad. The town has a rich history, known for its bravery and hospitality.

== Notable people ==
- Qandeel Baloch is said to have originated from this town.
