= Enaaya =

2019 web series

- Genre: musical-thriller
- Written by: Wajahat Rauf
- Screenplay by: Upendra Sidhaye
- Story by: Wajahat Rauf
- Directed by: Wajahat Rauf
- Presented by: Eros International
- Starring: Mehwish Hayat; Azfar Rehman; Rabab Hashim; Faryal Mehmood; Asad Siddiqui
- Country of origin: Pakistan
- Original language: Urdu
- No. of episodes: 12

Production
- Producers: Wajahat Rauf; Sh. Amjad Rasheed
- Cinematography: Rohit Prabhu; Haresh Bhanushali; John Jacob Payyapalli
- Editors: Sankalp Meshram; Monisha R Baldawa
- Running time: 30-40 minutes
- Production companies: Eros Motion Pictures; Showcase Productions

Original release
- Network: Eros Now
- Release: 20 January – 28 February 2019

Enaaya is a 2019 Pakistani web series produced by Eros Motion Pictures and Showcase Productions. It was globally released on 20 January 2019, on Indian streaming platform Eros Now as an original series. The series is directed and written by Wajahat Rauf. It received mixed reviews from critics.

== Cast ==
- Mehwish Hayat as Enaaya
- Azfar Rehman as Jimmy
- Rabab Hashim as Maryam
- Faryal Mehmood as Faryal
- Asad Siddiqui as Rasik
- Gul-e-Rana as Shama; Enaaya's mother
- Waqar Godhra as Mikoo
- Shan Baig as Asad
