= Commune Artist Colony =

Creative space in Karachi, Pakistan

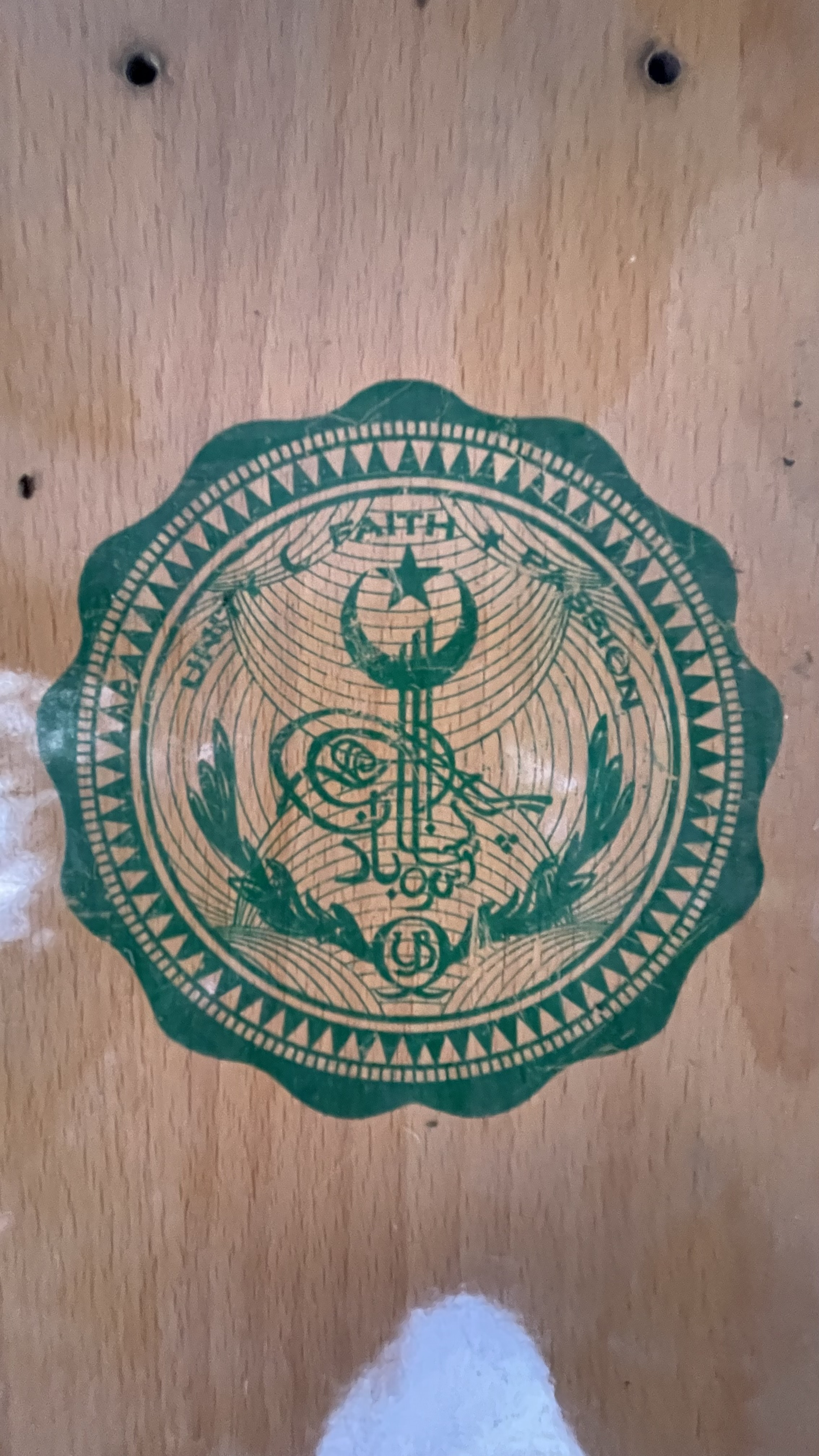
- Guiding motto: Unity-Faith-Passion
- Interactive map of Commune Artist Colony
- Address: Miskeen Gali, Old Queens Road, City Railway Colony
- Location: Karachi, Sindh, Pakistan
- Coordinates: 24°50′47″N 67°0′16″E
- Type: Artist colony, exhibition space, design studios

Commune Artist Colony is a creative space located in the City Railway Colony neighbourhood of Karachi, Pakistan. Founded in 2004 by fashion designer and artist Yousuf Bashir Qureshi, the commune is housed in a cluster of former warehouses on Miskeen Gali, off Old Queens Road. It functions as an atelier, exhibition venue, design studio complex, and community gathering space for practitioners of visual and performing arts. Its guiding motto is "Unity–Faith–Passion".

== Location and setting ==
The commune is situated within the City Railway Colony, a neighbourhood in Saddar Town, Karachi South, south of Karachi City railway station and adjacent to I. I. Chundrigar Road. It occupies a cluster of repurposed industrial warehouses on Miskeen Gali, near the MagnifiScience Centre. Despite its central location close to Karachi's main business district, the surrounding neighbourhood is characterised by limited infrastructure and irregular public services. The commune is noted as one of the area's principal cultural landmarks, alongside the Al Nadi Al Burhani Sports Complex.

== Mission and activities ==
The commune's purpose is the promotion of visual and performing arts and the strengthening of the artist community in Karachi and beyond. It serves as an alternative exhibition and performance space and as a platform for dialogue between the arts and the wider community, including the corporate sector. Interactive studios, exhibitions, and performances are regular features of the programme.

The compound houses multiple studio spaces, including facilities for painting, photography, fashion design, and craft production. The compound's walls also feature painted murals and graffiti, making it a site of street art within the surrounding neighbourhood. It is also home to Sanat Initiative, a contemporary art space founded by Abid Aziz Merchant that relocated to the commune in 2019 from its former premises in Clifton, occupying over 6,000 square feet of exhibition space. Sanat programmes regular exhibitions, artist residencies, publications, and curatorial projects.

Since its establishment, there were solo and group exhibitions, live musical performances, fashion presentations, artist residencies, and public talks hosted at the commune. Documented exhibitions include the Revelations series by painter Adil Akhtar, comprising seven acrylic paintings on themes of Islamic history and philosophy, which opened in April 2012 and Asahi, an exhibition of Japanese prints presented the same year. The commune has also hosted travelling international exhibitions, among them Arrival City/Seeking Home: The Afghan Narrative, presented in partnership with the Goethe-Institut in 2019. The commune has also served as a venue for live music.

During the 2010 Pakistan floods, portions of the commune were temporarily repurposed as a disaster relief hub, with warehouse space converted for the storage of food, medical supplies, and water purification equipment, and the venue used to auction donated artworks in support of flood relief.
