= Chikkar (film) =

2023 Pakistani film

- Film poster
- Directed by: Zaheer Uddin
- Screenplay by: Zaheer Uddin
- Produced by: Zaheer Uddin; Hamza Imam
- Starring: Usman Mukhtar; Ushna Shah; Nausheen Shah; Adnan Shah Tipu; Faryal Mehmood
- Cinematography: Shah Zaman Baloch
- Edited by: Imran Mushtaq
- Music by: Usman Sheikh; Haroon Sheikh
- Production company: Dareechay Films
- Release date: 22 December 2023
- Running time: 173 minutes
- Country: Pakistan
- Language: Urdu

Chikkar (Urdu: چکڑ Chikkar; IPA: [t͡ʃɪkəɽ], transl. The Mud) is a 2023 Pakistani Urdu-language thriller film directed and produced by Zaheer Uddin in his directorial debut. The film stars Usman Mukhtar, Ushna Shah, Nausheen Shah, Adnan Shah Tipu, Faryal Mehmood, Saleem Mairaj and Aliee Shaikh. It premiered in Karachi on 20 December 2023 and was released theatrically in Pakistan on 22 December 2023.

== Plot ==
After a dancer is murdered in Diyalpur, a police officer takes charge of the investigation. As he pursues the case, he becomes entangled in a web of deception and falsehood, placing his life and the well-being of his loved ones at risk. The story unfolds over the course of five days.

== Cast ==
- Usman Mukhtar as Sarmad Zaman
- Ushna Shah as Ayla Akbar
- Nausheen Shah as Zareen Shah
- Adnan Shah Tipu
- Faryal Mehmood as Neelam
- Saleem Mairaj as Arman Saleem Sawan
- Aliee Shaikh as Sardar

== Production ==
The trailer of the film was released on 1 December 2023.

== Reception ==
In a review for Dawn, Mohammad Kamran Jawaid praised the story and performances, but criticised the film's lengthy screenplay, colour grading and background score. Writing for The Express Tribune, Manahil Tahira praised the performances, humour and Zaheer Uddin's direction, calling it "a good one-time watch". Gaitee Ara Siddiqui of The News International praised the direction and supporting cast performances, while criticising the film's humour and extended conclusion.
