= Murder of Farzana Parveen =

2014 murder in Lahore, Pakistan

Farzana Parveen Iqbal was killed on 27 May 2014 outside a court in Lahore, Punjab, Pakistan. Her father, two brothers and former fiancé were among the nearly twenty attackers. Farzana, who had eloped with a man of her own choice, and was pregnant by him, was killed in a so-called honour killing.

== Incident ==
Muhammad Iqbal and Farzana had been secretly engaged for many years. When she became pregnant, they decided to marry. By this time, Farzana's family had betrothed her to a man they considered worthy and suitable. When Farzana revealed her love affair (but apparently not her pregnancy) to her parents, they were shocked. However, they agreed to meet Iqbal. At the meeting, Farzana's father, Muhammad Parveen, indicated that he would consent to the wedding on the condition that Iqbal settle a large amount of money in Farzana's name as Mehr (which is an integral part of any Muslim wedding ceremony). The money would ensure that Farzana would have a back-up in case the marriage fell apart later. Iqbal said he could not afford the suggested amount, and suggested a much smaller Mehr. Iqbal alleges that Farzana's father initially agreed to the smaller sum, but later changed his mind and insisted again on the larger sum of money, after getting to know more about Iqbal's background and circumstances. According to Iqbal, Farzana's father withdrew support for the marriage after Iqbal refused his demands for more money, beyond the originally agreed Mehr.

The lovers were determined to marry, and Farzana's pregnancy meant that they had no time to waste, so they eloped and got married without informing anyone. Since Farzana suddenly disappeared from her parents' house one day, the family informed the police and, on the advice of lawyers, filed a Habeas corpus petition in court. The runaway couple were quickly located by the police and duly produced in court.

On 27 May 2014, Farzana, 30, was attacked by about a dozen male family members outside the Lahore High Court. The attackers were led by her father, Muhammad Parveen, and included her two brothers and other family members. They began by punching and kicking her, and then used clubs and hurled bricks and stones at her. Farzana was pronounced dead at a local hospital, killed for eloping and marrying a man she loved.

Twelve people were arrested in connection with Farzana's death, including her father, Muhammad Parveen. Police investigator Mujahid quoted him as saying: "I killed my daughter as she had dishonoured all of our family by marrying without our consent, and I have no regret over it." In November 2014, four members of Farzana's family were convicted of murder and sentenced to death.

== See also ==
- Honour killing in Pakistan

- 2012 Kohistan video case
- Qandeel Baloch
- Samia Sarwar
- Death of Samia Shahid
- Ayman Udas
