= Ayman Udas =

Pakistani singer who was murdered in 2009

Aiman Udas
- Died: 2009 Peshawar, Pakistan
- Genre: Pashto music
- Occupation: Singer-songwriter
- Instrument: Vocals

Aiman Udas was a singer and songwriter in Peshawar, Pakistan. Udas had frequently performed on Pakistan Television and AVT Khyber, a private Pashto TV channel in Pakistan.

Her first song that she performed was Zma da mene na toba da bya ba nakon mena (in the Pashto language).

She won considerable acclaim for her songs but had become a musician in the face of bitter opposition from her family, who believed it was sinful for a woman to perform on television. In 2009, ashamed of her growing popularity, her two brothers are reported to have entered her flat while her husband (who was believed to be her 2nd husband) was out and fired three bullets into her chest, killing her. Neither has been caught.

Her final song was titled, “I died but still live among the living, because I live on in the dreams of my lover.”

== See also ==
- Honour killing in Pakistan

- 2012 Kohistan video case
- Qandeel Baloch
- Stoning of Farzana Parveen
- Killing of Samia Sarwar
- Death of Samia Shahid
