= Iram Parveen Bilal =

American film producer

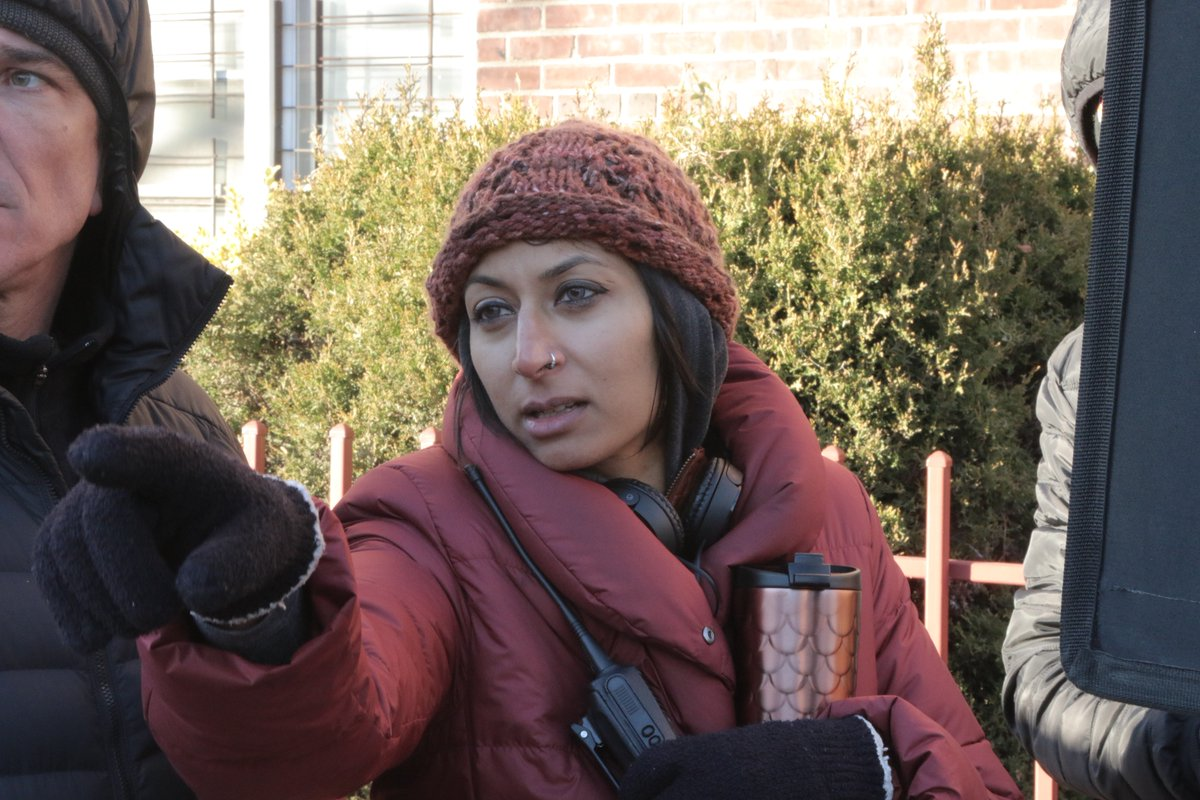
- Bilan in 2018
- Born: Iram Parveen Bilal; Pakistan
- Education: California Institute of Technology, University of Southern California
- Occupation: Filmmaker
- Known for: I'll Meet You There (Film) Qalambaaz (Screenwriting Lab)

Iram Parveen Bilal is a Pakistani-American filmmaker, activist and entrepreneur. In 2020, her feature film I'll Meet You There debuted at South by Southwest (SXSW) in the festival's narrative competition.

== Early life ==
Bilal was born in the United States. Bilal was raised in Nigeria and Pakistan, and came back to the US to study at the California Institute of Technology. She graduated with her B.S, honors, in Environmental Science Engineering. Upon graduating, Bilal was awarded a unique opportunity with the Thomas J. Watson Fellowship, a travel fellowship grant that took her around the world.

She was the inspiration behind Kareena Kapoor’s character name in the movie Agent Vinod.

== Career ==
=== Filmmaker ===
Her latest film, I'll Meet You There, is a family drama about a Muslim cop and his teenage ballerina daughter. The project was a Film Independent writer/director lab project and 1 of 10 out of thousands selected to compete in the SXSW 2020 grand jury. It further went on to compete at the Bentonville Film Festival as well.

Bilal was also 1 of 15 directors invited to Cinefondation's L'Atelier at Cannes 2019 for her feature project Wakhri (ONE OF A KIND), based on a social media star in Pakistan.

Her previous film Josh: Independence Through Unity is a mystery thriller set in Karachi that follows an upper-class woman who becomes determined to find out what happened to her missing caretaker. Her journey takes her to a nearby village run by a feudal lord, and in the process endangers herself and others. The story tackles themes of feudalism, youth movements, poverty, and the challenges of trying to do good amidst social unrest. Josh was Pakistan's first film to be on Netflix and in the permanent selection at the US Library of Congress.

Bilal was hired to direct the live action adaptation of the wildly popular The PhD comics in 2015. That led to her second feature: The PhD Movie: Still in Grad School. She is a Thomas J Watson, Women In Film, Film Independent and CAPE fellow and an active member of the Alliance of Women Directors and Film Fatales, both organizations vested for fair representation of female directors in the entertainment industry.

Other feature projects in development have received attention by IFP, The academy's Nicholl Writing Fellowship, Mumbai Sankalan Lab, Film Independent and Women In Film. Prominent awards and honors include the Thomas J. Watson Fellowship, Stark Special Project Scholarship, Mabel Beckman Leadership Award, Paul Studenski Fellowship and the Dean's Cup. In March 2013, she was asked to give a TedX talk entitled "Get Uncomfortable Now" at Caltech.

=== Qalambaaz ===
In 2014 Bilal initiated Qalambaaz, a platform that provides mentors and nurtures the growth of screenplay writers through competition. The screenplay writing competition was recently launched at The Second Floor (T2F) under Bilal's banner Parveen Shah Productions. Bilal clarifies that the platform does not promise funding for filmmakers, but guarantees a final product that can be sold as a possible feature film production.

== Filmography ==
	Year	Title		Notes
1	2009	Marwa	Director	Short Film
2	2012	Poshak/Facade	Writer, Editor, Director & Producer	Short Film
3	2013	Kwaku Ananse	Writer	Short Film
3	2013	Josh: Independence Through Unity	Writer, Director & Producer	Feature-length film. Screened at 14th Mumbai Film Festival
4	2014	Dho Dala: The Sin Washer	Writer, Editor, Director & Producer	Short Film
5	2015	Piled Higher and Deeper: Still in Grad School	Director	Feature-length film. Comedy.
6	2017	Extinction	Editor, Director & Producer	Short Film
7	2019	This is Personal	Director	Documentary
8	2019	Detained	Writer	TV Pilot
9	2019	I'll Meet You There	Writer, Director & Producer	Feature-length film SXSW 2020 - Narrative Competition
9	2019	Wakhri	Writer, Director & Producer	Feature-length film. Cannes L'Atelier
