= Death of Samia Shahid =

Suspected honour killing in Punjab, Pakistan

- Samia Shahid
- Native name: سامعہ شاہد
- Date: July 20, 2016; 10 years ago
- Location: Pandori, Jhelum, Pakistan
- Cause: Asphyxiation by strangulation
- Burial: Pandori, Jhelum, Pakistan
- Accused: Chaudhry Muhammed Shakeel; Chaudhry Mohammed Shahid
- Charges: Murder; rape

On 20 July 2016, Samia Shahid, a 28-year-old British-Pakistani woman, was found dead in Pandori, a village in Jhelum District of Punjab, Pakistan. Although involved in a dispute with her family, she had travelled to Pakistan alone as she had been told that her father was critically ill. Relatives claimed that she had died of natural causes, whereas her husband, Syed Mukhtar Kazim, believed that she had been murdered in a so-called "honour killing"; an autopsy and forensic examination concluded that she had been raped and strangled.

Her former husband, Chaudhry Muhammad Shakeel, was arrested on suspicion of her murder and, while in custody, allegedly confessed to drugging and strangling his ex-wife. Samia's father was held on suspicion of being an accessory to murder, released on bail in December 2016 and died in January 2018. As of 2020, the case against Shakeel remains untried.

== Background ==
Described as "a jolly, bubbly person, (who) always had a smile on her face", Samia Shahid was from Manningham, Bradford. She attended Nab Wood School and went on to work in a variety of sales roles while doing make-up artistry as a hobby.

In 2012, Samia was married to her cousin, Shakeel, in a match arranged by their parents. The wedding was celebrated in Pakistan, where most members of the family reside, and the wedding photographs show a beaming and apparently happy bride. Following the wedding, Samia returned to live in Bradford, while her husband remained in Pakistan, pending the processing of his immigration papers. In 2013, Samia met Syed Mukhtar Kazim and they fell in love with each other. In 2014, she converted from the Sunni sect to the Shia sect of Islam and obtained an ex-parte divorce from Shakeel from the Islamic Sharia Council of UK (which has no legal authority in the UK). Shortly afterwards, she married Kazim in Leeds and moved to Dubai with him.

Samia's family did not approve of these actions. They asserted that her divorce was not valid since the Islamic Sharia Council has no legal authority either in the UK or in Pakistan. Therefore, they said, she was still legally married to Shakeel, and her so-called second marriage was a "sham" amounting to adultery. Kazim claimed that Samia had been threatened by her family over their relationship and West Yorkshire Police confirmed that she had been subjected to verbal harassment by at least one family member (her mother) before she moved to Dubai. Immediately after she moved to Dubai, Samia's parents reported her as a missing person to the local police, rather than accepting that she was living life on her own terms. The police opened a missing person investigation, and contacted, among others, the Shia cleric from the Islamic Sharia Council of UK who had issued an ex-parte divorce. That Shia cleric later claimed that he was abused on the phone by her family members, and passed on a recording of these abuses to the Police in 2014. On a visit to Bradford in 2015, Samia attended a meeting with family members accompanied by a police chaperone; the meeting was fraught and an official warning for verbal harassment was issued to one of her relatives (her mother) as a result.

== Death ==
In July 2016, Samia received a telephone call claiming that her father was critically ill in Pakistan. She flew to Islamabad airport against the advice of Kazim, her "second husband," who believed that the claims were untrue. He stated “Obviously, I could see it was a lie.” He was worried about her safety and begged her not to go.

The day before Samia was due to return home to Dubai, Kazim stated that the "constant stream of instant messages" she'd been sending suddenly ceased.

Samia was found dead in her cousin's home on 20 July 2016.

Initially there were conflicting reports on the cause of Samia's death. According to Kazim, her cousin Mobeen told him over the telephone that she'd died of a heart attack. Local press agencies reported that Samia had committed suicide as a result of depression over not having children, a report which her family denied. Kazim maintained that Samia had been murdered by her family in an "honour" killing because they rejected her second marriage.

Samia's uncle, Haq Nawaz, obtained a death certificate from the "local union council", told Police that she'd died of "natural causes" and had her remains buried the same day. Investigating police officer, Aqeel Abbas, told The Guardian that there were "no signs of external physical injury" to Samia's body.

The autopsy, however, noted bruising around her neck and that, along with the forensic examination, concluded that she'd been raped and strangled.

== Investigation ==
Fearing "a potential cover-up", Samia's constituency MP, Naz Shah, wrote to Pakistani authorities and also spoke to Syed Ibne Abbas, then Pakistan's High commissioner to the United Kingdom. Shah stated: “I have asked for the police officer and the physician who did the first postmortem to be investigated.” Following Shah's intervention, two Bradford-based individuals were arrested over alleged threats made towards her.

On the basis of Kazim's allegations, and following the intervention of Shah, an in-depth investigation was ordered and the chief minister of Punjab arranged a "special committee" of leading police officers to prepare a report.

Subsequently, the original lead investigator, Abbas, was suspended from duty for "mishandling" the case and for allowing Samia's mother and sister to leave Pakistan and then arrested for "concealing evidence". Samia's uncle, Nawaz, having allegedly obtained the death certificate before the forensic examination had concluded, was arrested on suspicion of falsifying medical files. Samia's father, Muhammad Shahid, and ex-husband, Shakeel, were arrested by Jhelum police and held on remand.

On 14 August 2016, police stated that Shakeel confessed to strangling Samia.

=== Police report ===
Abubakar Buksh, the Deputy Inspector General of Police, led the fresh investigation which alleged, in conclusion, that Samia's death was a “premeditated and cold-blooded honour killing”. He stated: "We have completed our investigation and concluded that her ex-husband Muhammad Shakeel and father Muhammad Shahid were involved in her killing." Buksh also stated that Shakeel had been charged with raping her.

According to the report, a day before reaching Islamabad, Samia sent a text message to her friend saying that she was in fear for her life.

“Pray I come bk alive on 21jul my psyco cuzzan u see”

— Text message sent by Samia Shahid to her friend

Upon arrival, she had a childhood friend - as opposed to her family - collect her from the airport, leaving her passport and return ticket with them for security.

The report claimed that Samia's father and ex-husband wanted her to stay in Pakistan and renounce her second marriage. On the day before she was due to leave, Shakeel demanded her passport and plane ticket and, when she refused, he attacked her. She managed to run out of the room, telling him that she would go to the British authorities, at which point he allegedly strangled her with her scarf while Shahid held her legs.

It was further claimed that Shakeel was angry with Samia because the divorce impeded his chance of moving to the United Kingdom and becoming a British citizen and that Shahid intended to pardon his nephew if he had been charged with Samia's murder under the Diyya law of Pakistan.

== Legal proceedings ==
=== Pre-trial court proceedings and death of father ===
Muhammad Shahid was held in custody from July 2016 until being granted bail by Lahore High Court in December 2016; the court deemed that the evidence presented was insufficient to justify holding him on remand. He died in a Lahore hospital in January 2018 at the age of 52.

Abbas and Hawaz were bailed on payment of a bond in September 2016.

In October 2016, arrest warrants were issued for Samia's mother and sister and Pakistani authorities declared them "proclaimed offenders".

In, or around, September 2018, Shakeel was released on bail. Although reportedly admitting strangling Samia, confessions given to police are not admissible as evidence in Pakistan.

On 25 July 2020, in the absence of visible progress, Naz Shah wrote to the Prime Minister of Pakistan, Imran Khan, asking for ‘justice to finally be served’ in Samia's case.

=== Other legal proceedings ===
In August 2016, members of Samia's family in Pakistan sought criminal charges against Samia and Syed Kazam, accusing them of polyandry; it was claimed that documents had been forged, and Samia's ex-husband had been impersonated, in order for them to get married in the United Kingdom. They wanted Kazam, and others, to be charged with "impersonation, fraud, and fornication". Calling it an "attempt to derail" the murder trial, The Guardian quoted the family's lawyer as stating: "“In the witness box, if he comes and testifies, it will be very easy for us as defence counsels to shackle the credibility of that witness. If we show he was lying in one context he may not be believed in another context.” He added that the family hoped that seeking criminal charges would stop Kazam from returning to Pakistan to give evidence. A case was registered on 16 November 2016 citing fraud and forgery.

In September 2016, the BBC reported that a complaint of bigamy had earlier been made to West Yorkshire Police; the resultant report ascertained that Samia's divorce from Shakeel was not valid in the United Kingdom. It was claimed that Samia had presented herself as single when registering her second marriage and hadn't mentioned her previous marriage and divorce. West Yorkshire Police stated: “with the death of Samia it is not in the public interest to pursue this inquiry as the alleged Bigamist cannot be spoken to or brought to trial should it have progressed that far and the Crown Prosecution Service has also stated that there was no case to answer as the subject of bigamy is deceased.” A lawyer stated in response that the report would not have any effect on the murder trial, or change the status of Kazam, adding that Samia's alleged "false statement of being single" would not exonerate anyone involved in her murder.

In March 2017, members of Samia's family presented a petition to Lahore High Court seeking to stop the release of a documentary about her murder and the ensuing legal action. The petition was dismissed.

== BBC documentary ==
On 21 February 2018, the documentary Murdered for Love? Samia Shahid was screened on BBC Two. Produced and directed by Sasha Achilli, it draws on interviews with some of Samia's closest friends, her second husband Syed Mukhtar Kazim, Naz Shah and some of those involved in the murder investigation in Pakistan. Writing in The Times, James Jackson, said the documentary was "loaded with unequivocal anger" and served as a reminder that "there are those in this world who think that it’s somehow honourable for a man to rape his wife and to murder her, but not for that wife to have had a thought for herself regarding her romantic life".

== See also ==
- Honour killing in Pakistan
- 2012 Kohistan video case
- Murder of Farzana Parveen
- Samia Sarwar
- Ayman Udas
- Qandeel Baloch
