= City Railway Colony =

Neighbourhood in Karachi, Pakistan

City Railway Colony سٹی ریلوے کالونی
- Neighbourhood
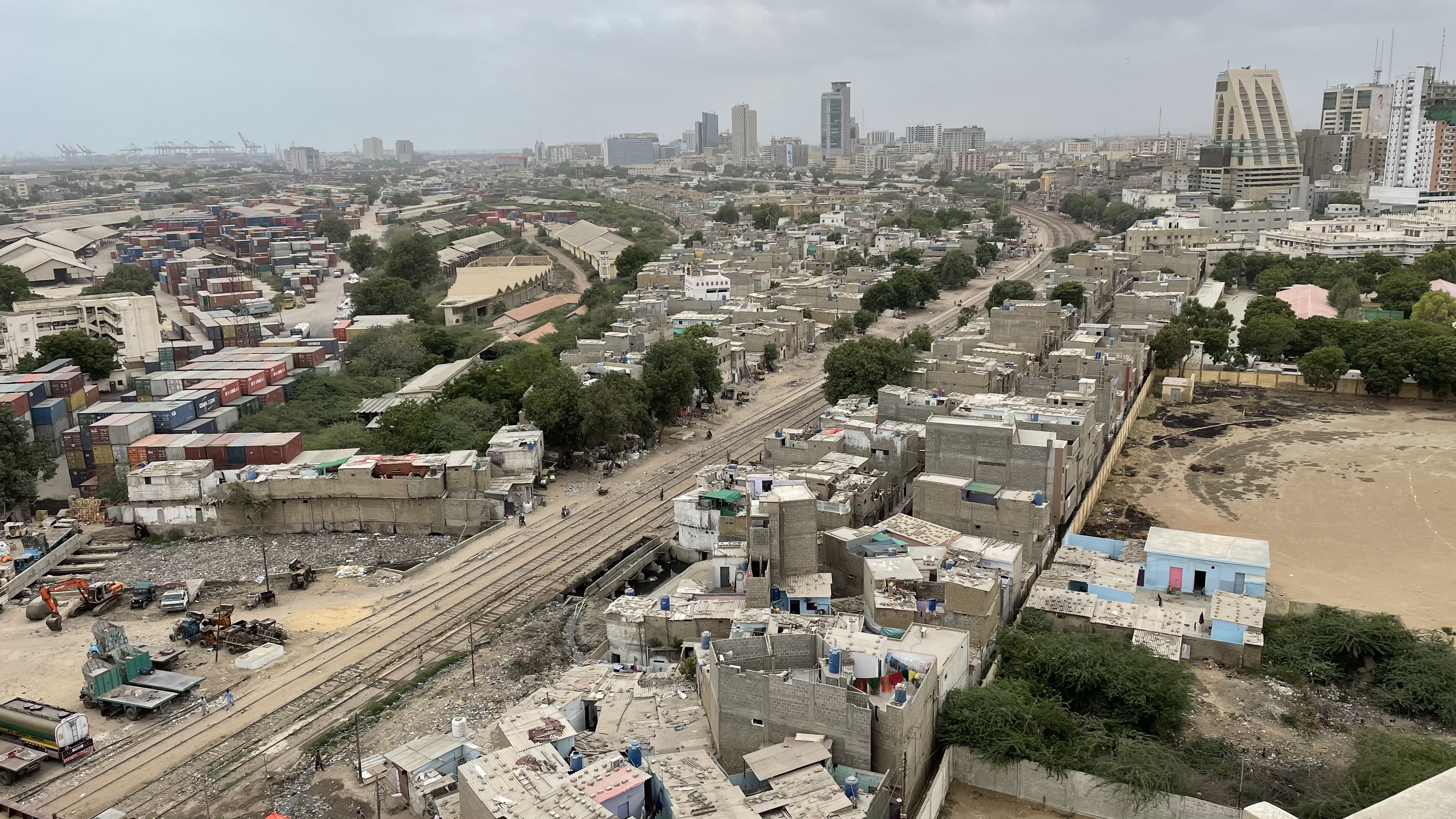
- View over the City Railway Colony
- Interactive map of City Railway Colony
- Coordinates: 24.847438°N 67.012344°E
- Country: Pakistan
- Province: Sindh
- City District: Karachi South
- Time zone: UTC+5 (PKT)

City Railway Colony, also Railway Quarter, (Urdu: سٹی ریلوے کالونی) is a neighbourhood in Saddar Town in Karachi, Pakistan, and is part of the administrative district Karachi South.

The colony encompasses the area south of Karachi City railway station and I.I. Chundrigar Road, stretching from Railway Street and the MagnifiScience Centre in the west to the Jinnah Courts and PIDC Bridge in the east. The southern boundary is marked by the Karachi Port Trust's container terminal and Moulvi Tamizuddin (M.T.) Khan Road.

Despite its central location near the main business district on I.I. Chundrigar Road, the area has received comparatively little infrastructure investment, and residents report irregular electricity, gas, and water supply. During a heatwave in June 2024, a prolonged power outage in Railway Colony and nearby areas led residents to protest near Shaheen Complex. Infrastructure projects have been limited and sporadic; the renovation of the railway bridge at City Railway Station is among the few carried out in recent years.

City Railway Colony, owing to its central location and proximity to the Karachi Port container terminal, hosts several commercial activities, including warehouses. It is also home to the Commune Artist Colony in Miskeen Gali and the Al Nadi Al Burhani Sports Complex, both of which draw visitors from across the city.

Following the 2018 general election, City Railway Colony fell within NA-248 (Karachi West-I). Pakistan's National Assembly constituencies were renumbered following the 2023 delimitation, and as of the 2024 general election the area falls within NA-241 (Karachi South-III), whose constituent localities include Saddar.

There are several ethnic groups including Muhajirs, Sindhis, Punjabis, Kashmiris, Seraikis, Pakhtuns, Balochis, Memons, Bohras and Ismailis.
