= Killing of Samia Sarwar =

Pakistani pahtan female honour killing victim (1970–1999)

Samia Sarwar (Urdu: ثمیہ سرور; 1970 – 6 April 1999) was a Pakistani woman who was shot dead in her lawyers' office in Lahore in a so-called honour killing arranged by her parents.

Sarwar was a married woman with two children, belonging to an affluent family of Peshawar. She had accused her husband, a cousin with whom she had an arranged marriage at seventeen, of marital abuse. She had been separated from him for several years, living at her parents' home with her children. She eventually filed for divorce after deciding to marry an army officer, but faced strong opposition from her family. Sarwar then sought the help of Lahore-based sisters Asma Jehangir and Hina Jilani, who were well-known human rights lawyers. Shortly afterwards, at a meeting between Sarwar and her mother at their chambers in Lahore, Sarwar was shot dead by an assassin hired by her own parents. They had arranged the murder of their daughter because they felt that she had brought shame upon the family by abandoning her husband to marry another man.

== Background ==
Samia Sarwar was born into an affluent and educated family based in Peshawar, the capital of Pakistan's Khyber-Pakhtoonkhwa province. Her father, Ghulam Sarwar Khan Mohmand, was not only a successful industrialist but also a prominent public figure, being the President of the Khyber-Pakhtunkhwa Chamber of Commerce. Her mother, Sultana Sarwar, was a medical doctor with a successful practice in Peshawar.

Sarwar had been married for over 10 years to a cousin, her mother's nephew, and had two young children. She had separated from her husband following accusations of physical abuse and had moved back to her parents' home with her children. After a chance meeting at a party, Sarwar fell in love with an army captain named Nadir Mirza. She filed a suit for divorce on the grounds that she was suffering violence and abuse at the hands of her husband. She filed the divorce papers in court secretly and later told her parents about it. Upon their refusal to support her, she left their home for Lahore.

After a frantic search, Sarwar's parents located her and threatened her with dire consequences if she did not come back quietly and returned to her husband. With money running short and no support forthcoming from relatives or others, either of money or shelter, Sarwar took refuge in Dastak, a shelter for women in Lahore. She particularly chose Dastak because that shelter was run by Asma Jehangir, a staunch feminist and women's rights activist. At Dastak, Sarwar knew she would receive not just food and shelter but also free legal counsel.

== Death ==
After being informed that Sarwar had taken refuge at Dastak, her mother sought permission to meet her and discuss matters with her. She stated that she was intensely worried about her daughter and that meeting and conversing with Sarwar may help her and the rest of the family to accept her decision to divorce her husband and remarry. Based on this understanding, Sarwar agreed to meet her mother at the offices shared by her two lawyers and mentors, the sisters Asma Jahangir and Hina Jilani. She however stipulated that her father and brothers, whom she knew were intensely hostile towards her after recent events, should not come to the meeting, and that her mother alone was to come.

Sarwar's mother came to the meeting accompanied by a man whom she did not recognize. He was there ostensibly to chauffeur Sarwar's mother and to help her climb the stairs. Once they were inside the lawyer's office, the man pulled out a gun and shot Sarwar dead at point-blank range.

== Aftermath ==
Nadir Mirza faced an army enquiry and was dismissed "in disgrace" from the army for irresponsible behavior "unbecoming of an army officer." He left the country soon afterwards. He now lives in Britain, and is married with two children.

Despite public protests and demonstrations, nobody received punishment for the crime. This is because the Pakistani Penal Code recognizes the Islamic practices of qisas and diya, where the next-of-kin of a victim can accept restitution and grant forgiveness to the culprit. In that case, the Pakistani state does not press charges even for otherwise cognizable offences like murder. Sarwar's father, being her wali or first-ranking kin, forgave the assassin and also his accomplice (being Sarwar's mother). The law has been amended since through the "Criminal Law (Amendment) (Offences in the name or pretext of Honour) Act, 2016", which states: "For murder committed in the name of honour, even if the accused is pardoned by the Wali or other family members of the victim, the Court will still punish the accused with imprisonment for life."

The two left-wing activists, the feminist lawyers Hina Jilani and Asma Jahangir, were threatened with death for their defense of Samia Sarwar. The death threats were issued by a number of religious groups, most notably the Jamiat Ulema-e-Islam. Asma Jehangir was the United Nations Special Rapporteur on Extra-Judicial Killings from 1998 to 2004.

=== In the Pakistani Senate ===
After the murder, Senator Syed Iqbal Haider of the Pakistan Peoples Party, supported by nineteen fellow senators, framed a resolution condemning the practice of 'honour killings.' Iqbal had to amend the wording of the proposed resolution four times, as supporting Senators became fewer. On the day when the bill was to be tabled in the Senate, a majority of that House opposed the introduction, Senator Ajmal Khattak stating that when it is a question of 'honour,' there is no room even for discussion. Chairman Wasim Sajjad (a Rhodes Scholar) ruled that there could be no discussion on the matter. As a result, the resolution was not even tabled in the house.

=== In media ===
A BBC documentary, Licence to Kill, covered Sarwar's killing and a few other honour killing cases which occurred in Pakistan. It was first broadcast on March 25, 2000 and won the RTS 2001 award for Best TV journalism. Licence to Kill is the follow-up to 1999's documentary, Murder in Purdah, on the killing of women in Pakistan. While 'Murder in Purdah' showed how casually women are killed in Pakistan, 'Licence to Kill' shows how state institutions endorse such killings and allow the killers to escape without punishment. Both films were selected for cinema screening at the Human Rights Watch Film Festival in London March 2000.

The BBC programme comments that "The Pakistan Penal Code, amended in 1990 to embrace Islamic principles, has made it easier for those who kill women to get away with it". This is because Sharia, the Islamic principles of law, practices Qisas on cases of murder. The concept of Qisas views a murder as a crime against the victim's family, not the State. This means that the victim's next of kin can forgive a murder if they choose to. So if a woman's family are complicit in killing her, then other family members, as next of kin, can legally forgive those complicit.

== See also ==
- Honour killing in Pakistan

- 2012 Kohistan video case
- Qandeel Baloch
- Stoning of Farzana Parveen
- Death of Samia Shahid
- Ayman Udas
