= Honour killing in Pakistan =

Honour killings in Pakistan are known locally as karo-kari (Urdu: کاروکاری). According to the Human Rights Commission of Pakistan, over 470 cases of honour killings were reported in Pakistan in 2021, although human rights defenders estimate that around 1,000 women are murdered in the name of honour every year. An honour killing is the murder of a member of a social group by other members, due to the belief the victim has brought dishonour upon the family or community. The death of the victim is viewed as a way to restore the reputation and honour of the family.

It is likely that honour killing has been a practice in Pakistan for many years, and, despite recent legal reforms, it remains a common practice in Pakistan today. Both international and Pakistani activists and activist groups are pushing for an end to the practice, although some say that change will not truly happen unless the general public chooses to condemn the practice.

== Background ==
Honour killing is an act of murder, in which a person is murdered for his or her perceived immoral behaviour. Such "immoral behaviour" may take the form of alleged marital infidelity, refusal to submit to an arranged marriage, demanding a divorce, perceived flirtatious behaviour and being raped. Suspicion and accusations alone are many times enough to defile a family's honour and therefore enough to warrant the killing of the woman.

In patriarchal cultures like Pakistan, women's lives are structured through a strict maintenance of an honour code. In order to preserve woman's chastity, women must abide by socially restrictive cultural practices pertaining to women's status and family izzat, or honour, such as the practice of purdah, the segregation of sexes. Honour killings are frequently more complex than the stated excuses of the perpetrators. More often than not, the murder relates to inheritance problems, feud-settling, the desire to get rid of a wife, for instance in order to remarry, or any combination of the above. Human rights agencies in Pakistan have repeatedly emphasized that victims were often women wanting to marry of their own will. In such cases, the victims held properties that the male members of their families did not wish to lose if the woman chose to marry outside the family.

A 1999 Amnesty International report drew specific attention to "the failure of the authorities to prevent these killings by investigating and punishing the perpetrators". According to women's rights advocates, the concepts of women as property and honour are so deeply entrenched in the social, political and economic fabric of Pakistan that the government, for the most part, ignores the daily occurrences of women being killed and maimed by their families. The fact that much of Pakistan's Tribal Areas are semi-autonomous and often governed by fundamentalist leaders makes federal enforcement difficult when attempted. In cases of murder, the victim's family is allowed to pardon the perpetrators, or reach a monetary settlement. The culprits are then free from prosecution and sentencing.

=== Terminology related to honour killing ===
Both Appiah and Jafri explain the historical significance of karo-kari (Urdu: کاروکاری) within Pakistan. Karo can be directly translated as "black [or 'blackened'] man" and kari as "black [or 'blackened] woman" and refers to sexual intercourse outside the bonds of marriage. The term karo-kari is commonly used as a synonym of "honour killing", especially in the Sindh region of Pakistan.

Originally, karo and kari were metaphoric terms for adulterer and adulteress, but it has come to be used with regards to multiple forms of perceived immoral behavior. Once a woman is labeled as a kari, family members consider themselves to be authorized to kill her and the co-accused karo in order to restore family honour. In the majority of cases, the victim of the attacks is female with her attackers being male members of her family or community.

=== Cultural pressures for honour killing in Pakistan ===
Pakistan is a collective, patriarchal society, and therefore social boundaries and community regard are based on honour; in this situation, honour is based on the behaviour of kin or members of a certain group. A Pakistani folk saying describes well the cultural importance of honour: "Daulat khonay pur kuch naheen khota, sihat khonay pur kuch kho jaata hai, ghairat khonay pur sub kuch kho jaata hai" ("When wealth is lost nothing is lost; when health is lost something is lost; when honour is lost everything is lost"). In Pakistan, honour is focused more on the perception of the community versus actual evidence. Honour is important for both women and men to uphold; women protect honour by modesty and men by masculinity. The cultural perspective behind honour is that if a woman does something that the community perceives as immodest then the men in her family must uphold their masculinity and regain the family honour by murdering the woman. If this action isn't completed the shame and dishonour can extend beyond the immediate family to the entire lineage, or even to the entire community. There are multiple other cultural characteristics that contribute to honour including a strong disdain for death. Due to this, the perpetrator of an honour killing is often highly regarded in the community because of their courage and because what they had to endure through with murdering another was worse than death itself. Many women are victimized by their own family members due to their defiance of familial expectations regarding love and marriage. This wave of violence has been exacerbated by a growing trend towards conservatism. Recent reports from the local Aurat Foundation reveal a 70% surge in honour killings between 2016 – 2017.

== Prevalence ==
As in other countries, the exact number of honour killings is not known. The Human Rights Commission of Pakistan lists 460 cases of reported honour killings in 2017, with 194 males and 376 females as victims. Of these murders, 253 were sparked by disapproval of illicit relations and 73 by disapproval of marriage choice. Additionally, out of the known suspect relationship with victims, over 93% were family relationships. Although these are most likely only a sample of the actual honour killings that were completed during 2017, it still gives a glimpse into characteristics of honour killings in Pakistan. Sources disagree as to the exact number by year, but according to Human Rights Watch, NGOs and INGOs in the area estimate that around 1,000 honour killings are perpetrated each year in Pakistan.

In 2015, nearly 1,100 women were murdered in honour killings in Pakistan. In 2011, human rights groups reported 720 honour killings in Pakistan (605 women and 115 men), while Pakistan's Human Rights Commission reported that in 2010 there were 791 honour killings in the country, and Amnesty International cited 960 incidents of women who were murdered in honour killings that year. Over 4,000 honour killing cases were reported in Pakistan between 1998 and 2004. Of the victims, around 2,700 were women vs about 1,300 men; 3,451 cases came before the courts. During this time, the highest rates were in Punjab, followed by the Sindh province. A significant number of cases have also been reported in North-West Frontier Province (NWFP) and in Balochistan. Nilofar Bakhtiar, advisor to Prime Minister Shaukat Aziz, stated that in 2003, as many as 1,261 women were murdered in honour killings.

=== Complications in data ===
Data and its absence are difficult to interpret. One reason is the reluctance to report honour killings to official bodies. Another reason is that honour killings are occurring in cultural and social contexts which do not recognize the criminality of honour killings. The very nature of honour killings reflects deeply entrenched notions of "honour" and "morality", in which the perpetrator is upholding justice and order when the victim commits deplorable social acts. The perpetrator becomes the champion of justice while the victim becomes the perpetrator and is accused of the criminal act. Human rights advocates are in wide agreement that the reported cases do not reflect the full extent of the issue, as honour killings have a high level of support in Pakistan's rural society, and thus often go unreported. Frequently, women & men murdered in honour killings are recorded as having committed suicide or died in accidents.

== Specific occurrences ==
In one of the most publicized honour killing cases committed in Pakistan, Samia Sarwar was murdered by her family in the Lahore office of well-known human rights activists Asma Jahangir and Hina Jilani in April 1999. As Sarwar sought assistance for a divorce from her first cousin, her family arranged her murder after the shame felt in her attempt to marry a man of her choice. The police did not make any arrests or pursue prosecution as Sarwar's family is highly well known in elite, political circles. The 2000 award-winning BBC documentary, License to Kill, covers Samia's murdering in Pakistan.

Amnesty International reported that on 27 April 2009, Ayman Udas, a Pashtun singer from the Peshawar area, was shot to death apparently by her two brothers who "viewed her divorce, remarriage and artistic career as damaging to family honour". No one was prosecuted.

A widely reported case was that of Tasleem Khatoon Solangi, 17, of Hajna Shah village in Khairpur district, which was widely reported after her father, 57-year-old Gul Sher Solangi, publicized the case. He alleged his eight months' pregnant daughter was tortured and murdered on 7 March 2008, by members of her village claiming that she had brought dishonour to the tribe. Solangi's father claimed that it was orchestrated by her father-in-law, who accused her of carrying a child conceived out of wedlock, potentially with the added motive of trying to take over the family farm.

The 14 July 2008 honour killings in Baba Kot occurred in Balochistan. Five women were murdered by tribesmen of the Umrani Tribe of Balochistan. The five victims – three teens, and two middle-aged women – were kidnapped, beaten, shot, and then buried alive because they refused the tribal leader's marriage arrangements and wanted to marry men of their own choosing. Local politicians may have been involved in the murders. Syed Iqbal Haider commented that the Pakistani government had been very slow to react. Senator Israr Ullah Zehri defending the killings, stating, "these are centuries-old traditions and I will continue to defend them".

On 27 May 2014 a pregnant woman named Farzana Iqbal (née Parveen) was stoned to death by her family in front of a Pakistani High Court for eloping and marrying the man she loved, Muhammad Iqbal. Police investigator Mujahid quoted the father as saying: "I killed my daughter as she had insulted all of our family by marrying a man without our consent, and I have no regret over it." Muhammad Iqbal stated that it had been a prolonged engagement, and Farzana's father had become enraged only after Iqbal refused a demand for more money than the originally agreed amount of the bride price. Muhammad Iqbal strangled his first wife so that he would be free to marry Farzana, and police said he had been released after that murder when a "compromise" was reached with his first wife's family.

In 2015, a documentary was released about Saba Qaiser, a woman from Punjab, Pakistan, who married a man against her family's wishes because his family was of "lowly status". In response to her elopement, her father and uncle beat her, shot her in the head, put her body in a sack, and threw the sack into a river. Amazingly, Saba survived the violent attack, escaped the sack, swam to shore, and was able to get help at a local gas station. While still in recovery, Saba was pressured by community leaders to forgive her father and uncle. During that time, the "forgiveness law" was still in place, allowing murderers of victims to be released if the family chose to forgive them. With the help of a pro bono human rights lawyer, Saba fought the case in court, but finally chose to exclaim forgiveness in court due to the pressure she was receiving. Due to her forgiveness in court, Saba's attackers were released from jail. Both her uncle and father were later imprisoned again in April 2016, and were set to be released March 2017, leaving Saba worrying for her life.

In July 2016, popular Pakistani social media celebrity Qandeel Baloch was strangled by her brother in an act of honour killing in Multan in the province of Punjab. She had reportedly raised controversy by posting controversial pictures of herself on social media, including one alongside a Muslim cleric, and her brothers had asked her to stop. The state was named as complainant in Qandeel's murder case, making it impossible for her family to pardon her killers. Qandeel's brother Waseem was arrested on the charges of murder. He confessed to murdering his sister, saying "she Qandeel Baloch was bringing disrepute to our family's honour and I could not tolerate it any further. I killed her around 11:30 p.m. on Friday night when everyone else had gone to bed."

In July 2016, a British woman, Samia Shahid, flew to visit her family in Pakistan under false pretenses; she was told she needed to come immediately because her father was dying. On 20 July 2016 (only six days after arriving in Pakistan), she was found dead - raped and strangled - in Punjab, Pakistan, at the home of Mohammed Shakeel, her former husband. Years earlier, Samia had been forced to marry her cousin, Mohammed Shakeel, in an arranged marriage. In 2014, Samia married Syed Mukhtar Kazam and started a new life with him in Dubai. Before flying to Pakistan in 2016, Samia expressed she was worried about the nature of the visit, about seeing her former husband, and about whether or not she would come home alive. In a BBC documentary about her death, Murdered for Love? Samia Shahid, BBC shares that Shakeel murdered Samia after she refused to remarry him. Police reports say that Shakeel raped and murdered Samia after she refused to reveal the location of her passport. Additionally, the BBC documentary reports that Samia was able to briefly escape the attack by Shakeel and run into his hallway but then she was then confronted by her father who nodded his approval to Shakeel before Shakeel strangled Samia. Samia's family claimed she died by heart attack but the autopsy reports showed that she was raped and strangled. Her father was released from police custody due to lack of evidence and later died without being charged. Her cousin and former husband, Shakeel, is still in police custody.

In January 2017 a Pakistani mother was sentenced to death for murdering her daughter by burning her alive, for ‘bringing shame to the family’ by marrying against her family's wishes.

In February 2018, a man and five accomplices opened fire on a couple in Karachi, Pakistan, killing the husband, Rozi Khan, and injuring the wife, Zainab. Zainab put up a fight and was further attacked with sticks and a knife, but still survived. The couple had entered into a marriage that most of their family was opposed to but that Zainab's mother and brother gave permission for. The main assailant in the honour killing and attempted honour killing is Zainab's nephew. The nephew was apprehended at a private hospital following the attack where he claimed his injuries from fighting Zainab were instead from being robbed. The nephew's friend is also a suspect in the case.

Also, in February 2018, a 19-year-old woman was murdered in Karachi by her brother for having an affair with one of her relatives. Her father and two landlords have also been arrested in addition to her brother, and all have confessed their involvement. Prior to her killing, a local jirga declared she was a "sinful woman".

In 2020 June a woman was allegedly stoned to death in Jamshoro district of Sindh province allegedly in tradition of karo-kari. Other similar six instances were reported beginning of July 2020 from Sukkur, Jacobabad, Naushahro Feroze and Dad Leghari regions of Sindh. From January 2019 to June 2019 the official figure of karo-kari murders was at 78 cases.

In 2023, an 18-year-old woman was fatally shot by her father and uncle in Kohistan District. Her murder was ordered by the elders of a jirga, a tribal council, because she appeared in a photo with a young man, who they also wanted dead. The man was taken into protective custody. The police suspected that the photo was digitally altered.

In July 2025, a video surfaced showing the execution-style killing of a couple in Balochistan, allegedly on orders of a tribal council after they married against family wishes. At least 11 suspects were arrested following public outrage and condemnation by political leaders. In August 2026, a man and a woman were shot dead in a suspected 'honour' killing in the Wadh area of Khuzdar, Balochistan. The victims were identified as Muhammad Ishaq Bugti, originally from Dera Allah Yar, and a woman of the Jatoi tribe from Dhadar, whose full name police withheld; both had been living in Wadh at the time of the killing.

In August 2026, a 19-year-old woman, named in local reports as Shumaila Rahpoto, was allegedly killed by her father in the Khairo Dero area of Sehwan, Sindh, over an accusation of karo-kari, the regional term for an "honour" killing. Reports said the dispute stemmed from her having married, or wishing to marry, a man of her own choice.

In June 2026, a series of violent incidents involving young women over a 15-day period raised concern in Jacobabad District, Sindh, including a fatal shooting at a wedding and two disputed cases initially described as suicides. In one case, Jannat Khatoon was shot dead in her wedding tent in Goth Gul Khan Banglani, within the jurisdiction of Thul's C-Section police station; her brother told police the accused, Zafarullah Banglani, had previously proposed marriage to her and opened fire after the proposal was rejected, and a murder case was registered against him and two unidentified accomplices. In a separate case, 25-year-old Saima Sarki, a mother of two, died of a gunshot wound in Goth Sachal Sarki; while initially reported as a suicide, local residents questioned that account and called for a murder investigation. In a third case, 23-year-old Amiran was reported to have died by suicide in the jurisdiction of Garhi Khairo police station, a death family members attributed to suicide but which local residents also viewed with suspicion. At the time of publication, police had not announced any link between the cases, and several investigations remained ongoing.

In June 2026, a man and a woman were shot dead by unidentified gunmen near the Khokhar Laharo area of Usta Muhammad, Balochistan. The victims, identified as Muhammad Ramzan and Sameena, were reportedly from Nushki and belonged to the Pirkani tribe; some local sources alleged the couple had entered into a love or court marriage, though this was not officially confirmed. When no relatives came forward to claim the bodies, they were buried in a local graveyard by authorities, and police said an investigation into the killings was continuing.

== Pakistani law ==
An Amnesty International report noted "the failure of the authorities to prevent these killings by investigating and punishing the perpetrators". Honour killings are supposed to be prosecuted as ordinary murder, but in practice, police and prosecutors often ignore it. The Pakistani government's failure to take effective measures to end the practice of honour killings is indicative of a weakening of political institutions, corruption, and economic decline. In the wake of civil crisis, people turn to other alternative models, such as traditional tribal customs. In 2016, Pakistan repealed the loophole which allowed the perpetrators of honour killings to avoid punishment by seeking forgiveness for the crime from another family member and thus be legally pardoned.

In some rural parts of Pakistan, the male-dominated jirga decides affairs and its executive decisions take primacy over state legislation. A jirga arbitrates based on tribal consensus and tribal values among clients. Tribal notions of justice often include violence on client's behalf. For example, in December 2017, a local jirga in Karachi, Pakistan, condemned Ghani Reham and Bakhtaja to death by electrocution. The teenage couple, 18-years-old and 15-years-old, had eloped. The murdering was sanctioned by the jirga and then carried out by the couple's fathers and uncles.

Even though primacy is taken over state legislation, if presented in court a runaway bride will have her marriage be condemned as legal. In the Muslim Family Law Ordinance 1961, they are concerned with the procedural part of the marriage. In some cases, families will file a runaway bride as a missing person that has been abducted. This was the case for Shaukat Ali. She had run away with her love and married him secretly, knowingly her family still filed for abduction on the behalf of her love. When presented in front of court she stated that that she had married the boy in free will, which in turn the court had dismissed her case of abduction.

=== Roots in British Colonial Law ===
Leniency against honour killings in the Pakistani penal code traces its roots to British Colonial law. Pakistan's legal code is based on the 1860 code imported by Britain, which granted a lenient sentence to a man who murdered his wife for "grave and sudden provocation". Pakistan's Federal Shariat Court reformed this law in 1990 to bring it closer to the Sharia, declaring that "according to the teachings of Islam, provocation, no matter how grave and sudden it is, does not lessen the intensity of crime of murder". Lenient sentences, however, are still handed down by certain judges, who continue to justify it by citing the British law's "grave and sudden provocation".

=== Legal reforms ===
The law on honour killings has been reformed several times throughout the years. Notable legislation reforms to protect women in Pakistan from violence include The Protection of Women (Criminal Laws Amendment) Act of 2006, Criminal Law (Third Amendment) Act of 2011, The Punjab Protection of Women against Violence Act of 2016, and The Criminal Law (Amendment) (Offences in the name or pretext of Honour) Act of 2016.

On 8 December 2004, under international and domestic pressure, Pakistan enacted a law that increased punishment for honour killings to prison term of seven years, or by the death penalty in the most extreme cases. Women and human rights organizations were, however, skeptical of the law's impact, as it stopped short of outlawing the practice of allowing murderers to buy their freedom by paying compensation to the victim's relatives, which was problematic because most honour killings are committed by close relatives.

In March 2005, the Pakistani parliament rejected a bill which sought to strengthen the law against the practice of honour killing declaring it to be un-Islamic. The bill was eventually passed in 2006 as the Protection of Women (Criminal Laws Amendment) Act of 2006, also known as The Women's Protection Bill. However, doubts of its effectiveness remained. The bill created a punishment of imprisonment for life and a fine if a woman is abducted or induced to marry a person without her personal consent and will. The bill also expanded the definition of rape to include sexual intercourse without a woman's consent, against her will, a punishment for the false accusation of fornication, and expanding zina to be prosecutable only if accused by four male eye-witnesses and registered in court (discretionary punishment for zina removed). Even with these added protections against crimes that commonly lead to honour killing, honour killing itself was not addressed in this bill. Doubts of the effectiveness of this bill have remained.

The Criminal Law (Third Amendment) Act of 2011 created a punishment for giving or compelling a woman to marry for any reason including the purpose of preventing criminal liability (for example, in the case of rape) or settling a civil dispute.

The Punjab Protection of Women against Violence Act of 2016 was passed to amend Pakistani law to further protect women. The goal of this act is "to establish an effective system of protection, relief and rehabilitation of women against violence". Through this act, the Provincial Assembly of Punjab commits to allow a person to receive protection if in danger or treated unfairly, create a safe-house and rescue and recovery system, protect individuals through protection orders, order property and monetary recompense to the victim, and established the power to enter homes to respond to a potential threat and safely remove the victim to a safe location, if requested by the victim. In addition, this act requires that a District Women Protection Committee be created to advocate for victims and ensure these laws are being followed.

Although the Punjab Protection of Women against Violence Act in 2016 is a step forward in providing services and protection for women, Siddiqi believes that even further action needs to be taken to protect women. According to Siddiqi, even though this act closes some of the legal loopholes surrounding honour killing and domestic violence, this act will not work unless the public is committed to condemning and ending the violence.

The Criminal Law (Amendment) (Offences in the name or pretext of Honour) Act of 2016 repealed the loophole which allowed the perpetrators of honour killings to avoid punishment by seeking forgiveness for the crime from another family member, and thus be legally pardoned and receive light punishment. This bill focuses primarily on honour killing and its legal punishment. In addition to closing the loophole mentioned above, the act established a punishment of 14 years imprisonment to life in prison for crimes committed "on the pretext of honour". Even with the major improvements by this act, honour killing has continued in Pakistan.

== International activism ==
Human rights are natural rights, fundamentally ensured to every human, regardless of nationality, race, gender, or ethnic group. Through the ongoing work of the United Nations, the universality of human rights has been clearly established and recognized in international law.

In March 1996, Pakistan ratified the CEDAW, or the Convention on the Elimination of All Forms of Discrimination against Women. By ratifying CEDAW, Pakistan promises to abolish discriminatory laws and establish tribunals and public institutions to effectively protect women. CEDAW, as a human rights treaty, notably targets culture and tradition as contributing factors to gender-based discrimination. In 1993, the United Nations General Assembly adopted the Declaration on the Elimination of Violence against Women, entreating states not to invoke custom, tradition, or religious consideration to avoid their obligation to eliminate violence against women.

According to Amnesty International, if a government is negligent in prosecuting perpetrators, it is liable and complicit in those abuses. The role of the modern nation-state is to ensure full protection of universal human rights. The prevalence of honour killings in Pakistan underscores the Pakistani government's systematic failure in ensuring fundamental human rights to women.

However, international organizations and feminists globally have been criticized for upholding a Western-centric agenda when engaging in honour-killing activism. Long-standing discourses on the universality of human rights versus cultural relativism indicate tensions in international activism for women's rights. But cultural relativism can be partially resolved when local activists make clear that cultural customs are harmful to women and in violation of international human rights standard. Cultural and religious customs are constantly evolving and it is necessary to partner with regional activists in Pakistan to be at the forefront for demanding change.

=== International activist groups ===
IKWRO helps provide local resources for women and girls who are fleeing from dangerous situations, including honour killing. The group provides advocacy, training, and counseling to these women and girls and strives to work with the police and others to improve their safety.

Women Living Under Muslim Laws serves as a public source for information by helping provide public appeals and statements on human rights issues towards women, including honour killing. The organization acknowledges that Islam is not practiced the same everywhere, and that many times politics and cultures use religion as an excuse to abuse women.

Humanity Healing International and Hope Development Organization are working together to create a trained network of Pakistani women to advocate against honour killing. The groups have a plan to train 500 women in 10 different targeted areas on how to become advocates, including holding press conferences and public rallies. The goal is to specifically target policy makers and members of the Pakistan National Assembly Standing Committee in order to effectuate change.

Recent international documentaries have also helped raise international awareness about honour killing in Pakistan. For example, BBC's Murdered for Love? Samia Shahid tells the story of Samia Shahid, a British woman who was lured back to Pakistan and then raped and murdered by her former husband and her father.

=== Proposed international activism ===
Collective shaming, also known as international shaming and state shaming, is a strategy used by international entities (such as INGOs or other countries) to pressure governments to act in a certain way. Collective shaming has been a tool used by the international community to facilitate change, including legal change, in Pakistan in regard to honour killing in the past. Appiah uses the example of Safia Bibi to show the effective collective shaming can have. Safia Bibi was a blind maid who, at the age of thirteen, was raped by her employer's son. The rape was brought to public attention when she became pregnant. The law at the time said that she needed to visually identify the perpetrator in order to convict him. Safia was unable to do this because of her blindness and therefore was punished for sexual misconduct and subject to 30 lashes (a relatively lenient punishment). The case attracted international attention and collective international shaming. Due to the pressure from the international community, the court decision was reversed.

Appiah suggests that the practice of collective shaming be more strongly applied to change not only laws, but also to change the local cultural perspective of honour killing. Honour is obviously a major characteristic of Pakistani culture, and Appiah suggests that outsiders and insiders work together to make the community feel as if honour killing is bringing shame upon them and is therefore dishonourable (removes their honour). If enough people outside and inside the country view honour killing as dishonourable, then the cultural practice will change, and families will need to stop performing honour killings to remain honourable. Changing perspectives will take time, but will eradicate the practice almost permanently.

== Pakistani activism ==
Human rights activists in Pakistan have been on the forefront of change and reform to end the practice of honour killings. Emphasizing universal human rights, democracy, and global feminism, Pakistani activists seek legal reform to criminalise the practice and protect victims from abuse.

Asma Jahangir, chairperson of Human Rights Commission of Pakistan, and Hina Jilani are Pakistani lawyers reinvigorating civil society to become critical of the Pakistani state's failure to ensure fair rights and benefits to its female citizenry. Jahangir and Jilani founded Pakistan's first legal aid center in 1986 and a women's shelter called Dastak in 1991 for women fleeing from violence.

Other notable Pakistani activists working on reporting and deterring honour killings include Aitzaz Ahsan, Ayaz Latif Palijo, Sharmeen Obaid-Chinoy and Shahnaz Bukhari.

In June 2016, the Council of Islamic Ideology, a body of Muslim clerics which advises the government on compliance of laws with the Shariah, has "decreed that honour killings are un-Islamic".

The Pakistani Women's Human Rights Organization, a local NGO, helps provide a voice for victims by sharing their stories, working with international human rights organizations to fight international human rights violations, and changing laws to improve the situation for women with Pakistan.

In 2006, the National Police Bureau established the Gender Crime Cell in order to gather data about crimes committed against women in Pakistan, an area that was previously missing significant portions of data. The goal was to use this data to make more appropriate policy decisions to protect women and punish offenders. One part of this solution included the Gender Responsive Policing Project, which began in 2009. This project focused on improving police procedures in response to gender-based crimes, as well as to create more opportunities for women within the police department. Another one of the Gender Crime Cell's projects has been the Women Police Network (WPN), with the goal of connecting police organizations across the country in order to improve fact and practice sharing with the goal of improving women's situations.

Sharmeen Obaid-Chinoy, a Canadian-Pakistani journalist, created the documentary, A Girl in the River: The Price of Forgiveness (2015), as her way to inform the world about honour killings in Pakistan and to motivate people to join the fight against the practice. Her documentary won an Academy Award in 2016 for Best Documentary Short Subject. As of April 2018, this documentary has had over 384K views on YouTube and is bringing the issue of honour killing to an international audience.

== See also ==
=== Honour killings of people of Pakistani heritage outside of Pakistan ===
- Shafilea Ahmed (United Kingdom)
- Sandeela Kanwal (United States)
- Ghazala Khan (Denmark)
- Rukhsana Naz (United Kingdom)
- Aqsa Parvez (Canada)
- Hina Saleem (Italy)
- Sadia Sheikh (Belgium)
- A Wedding (2016 film, co-produced by three European countries and Pakistan, about an honour killing of a Belgian woman of Pakistani heritage, based on the Sadia Sheikh case)
- Saman Abbas (Italy)

=== Related ===
- Acid attack
- Blue Veins (Pakistan)
- Domestic violence in Pakistan
- Ghairat
- Feudalism in Pakistan
- Hudud Ordinances
- Human rights in Pakistan
- Sexuality in Islam
- Coerced religious conversion in Pakistan
- List of honor killings in Iran
- Mera Jism Meri Marzi
- Misogyny
- Rape in Pakistan
- Violence against women in Pakistan
- Women in Islam
- Women related laws in Pakistan
