= I'll Meet You There (film) =

2020 film by Iram Parveen Bilal

- Theatrical release poster
- Directed by: Iram Parveen Bilal
- Written by: Iram Parveen Bilal
- Produced by: Iram Parveen Bilal; Joy Ganes; Ilana Rossein
- Starring: Faran Tahir; Qavi Khan; Nikita Tewani; Sheetal Sheth; Samrat Chakrabarti
- Cinematography: Anthony C. Kuhnz
- Edited by: Cari Coughlin; Spence Nicholson
- Music by: CION Collective (Ahsan Bari; Faisal Baig)
- Production company: Parveen Shah Productions
- Distributed by: Level Forward
- Release date: 15 August 2020 (Bentonville Film Festival)
- Running time: 1h 30m
- Country: United States
- Languages: Urdu; English

I'll Meet You There is a 2020 drama film written, directed and produced by Iram Parveen Bilal with co-producers Joy Ganes and Ilana Rossein. The film portrays a modern Pakistani-American family in Chicago, and stars Faran Tahir, Qavi Khan, Nikita Tewani, Sheetal Sheth, and Samrat Chakrabarti. It was nominated for the Narrative Feature Grand Jury Award at South by Southwest in 2020.

== Plot ==
Dua, a young Pakistani-American woman, dreams of becoming a professional dancer. Majeed, her father and a Chicago police officer, supports her dream. For her audition at Juilliard, Dua trains in Kathak dance, following in the footsteps of her deceased mother. An unexpected visit from Majeed's father from Pakistan causes Dua to reckon with her Americanization, brings reminders of her mother's death, and encourages Majeed to become more involved with the local mosque and Muslim community. But when a new assignment with the Chicago police requires Majeed to surveil his community members at the mosque, the consequences affect the entire family.

== Cast ==
- Faran Tahir as Majeed
- Qavi Khan as Baba
- Nikita Tewani as Dua
- Sheetal Sheth as Shonali
- Samrat Chakrabarti as Dr. Sahil Khan

== Release ==
I'll Meet You There was originally set to have its world premiere at South by Southwest in March 2020; however, due to the COVID-19 pandemic, the film festival was cancelled. Instead, I'll Meet You There premiered in the US at the Bentonville Film Festival in August 2020, and its world premiere took place at the Los Angeles Asian Pacific Film Festival in September 2020.

In December 2020, Level Forward studios acquired distribution rights for the film in North America. The film was rolled out in North America on February 3, 2021.

=== Ban in Pakistan ===
In March 2022, one week before the film's anticipated release in Pakistan, the Central Board of Film Censors announced that it had banned I'll Meet You There from showing in the country. The Board cited that the film "does not reflect true Pakistani culture" and "portrays a negative image of Muslims." The cast and filmmaker Bilal decried the censorship, with Bilal stating: "I respectfully disagree that there is just one notion of what Pakistan and Pakistani values are. When we ask the diaspora to contribute and donate, when we even care to enable them to vote in elections, then we should also include their troubles, identity struggles and issues as 'Pakistani.' Let’s please end the elitism that a nation or religion can only belong to a select few."

== Reception ==
=== Critical response ===
On the review aggregation website Rotten Tomatoes, the film holds an approval rating of 86% over seven reviews. The film has been described as a "departure from how Muslims and South Asians have typically been depicted in American cinema" for how supportive Majeed is of his daughter's agency as a young woman.

=== Accolades ===
The film was nominated for the Narrative Feature Grand Jury Award at South by Southwest in 2020. In 2021, the film was a recipient of a ReFrame Stamp for gender equality in hiring for a narrative feature film.
