= Qandeel Baloch =

Pakistani model, actress, and activist (1990–2016)

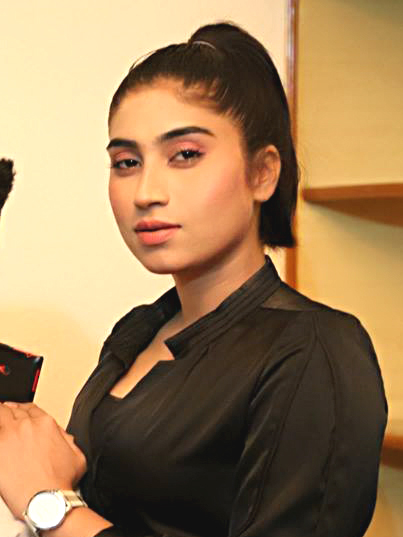
- Qandeel Baloch in 2014
- Born: Fouzia Azeem; 1 March 1990; Shah Sadar Din, Punjab, Pakistan
- Died: 15 July 2016 (aged 26); Multan, Punjab, Pakistan
- Occupations: Social media celebrity, model, actress, singer
- Years active: 2013–2016
- Spouse: Aashiq Hussain (m. 2008; div. 2010)
- Children: 1

Qandeel Baloch (Note: Urdu: قندیل بلوچ) (born Fouzia Azeem; (Note: Urdu: فوزیہ عظیم) 1 March 1990 – 15 July 2016) was a Pakistani model, actress and feminist activist. She was the country's first social media celebrity. Azeem rose to prominence due to her videos on social networks discussing her daily routine, her rights as a Pakistani woman, and various controversial issues.

Baloch first received recognition from the media in 2013, when she auditioned for Pakistan Idol; her audition became popular, and she became an Internet celebrity. She was one of the top 10 most searched-for persons on the Internet in Pakistan and was both celebrated and criticised for the content of her videos and posts.

She was murdered on 15 July 2016 by her brothers, one of whom said he had killed her for "bringing disrepute to our family's honour".

== Early life ==
Qandeel was born on 1 March 1990 in Shah Sadar Din, a town in the Dera Ghazi Khan District, of the southern part of the Punjab province of Pakistan into a Saraiki-speaking Baloch family. She came from an underprivileged family, the daughter of Anwar Bibi and Muhammad Azeem, who scratched a living from local farming. She had six brothers and two sisters. Growing up, she was interested in her studies, as well as acting and singing. Before her rise to fame, her first job was as a bus hostess.

== Career ==
Baloch's fame was based on her social media posts – pictures, videos and comments. These were considered bold and outrageous by the conservative segment of Pakistani society. Her most popular videos were those of her with her catchphrase "How em luking?" (How am I looking?) and those of her saying "Maire sar mai pain ho raha hai" (my head hurts) in a funny and catchy tone. Her catchphrases became popular and were humorously adopted by Pakistani youth. They also featured dubbing social media site dubsmash and became widely popular among Indian and Pakistani youth alike. Some international news media compared her to Kim Kardashian; however, local commentators stated that she was more significant than Kardashian, as Baloch "went against the norms of society" and lived life on her own terms. She started to appear on Pakistani talk shows regularly by 2014, either to perform songs or to discuss her rising social media popularity. She participated in "Desi Kuriyan (season 4)" as a contestant. She also served as digital manager at Neptuner Web Solutions.

In June 2016, Baloch met senior cleric Mufti Abdul Qawi at a hotel to learn more about her faith; the interaction between them brought about mayhem on social media platforms, as their photos became popular online. She also wore a hat with the Mufti's signature. The meeting led to the Mufti being suspended from his position from one of Pakistan's religious committees, and to Baloch being a regular on popular Pakistani current affairs and news programmes. She appeared on various popular Pakistani TV shows with senior anchors such as Mubashir Lucman. She would mostly be on talk shows debating with religious scholars on her western and controversial acts and lifestyle.

A previous stunt which became popular on social media was her promise to strip dance for her followers and to dedicate her dance to cricketer Shahid Afridi if Pakistan won the Twenty20 match against India on 19 March 2016. She released a teaser on social media, which became popular, but Pakistan lost the match. Some Indian media compared her to Poonam Pandey.

As her media presence grew, Baloch began to use her position to comment on women's position in Pakistani society. The week before she was murdered, she released a music video entitled Ban, which mocked the restrictions placed on women in the country. In an interview with controversial anchor Mubashir Luqman, Baloch named Sunny Leone, Rakhi Sawant and Poonam Pandey as her inspirations. She also said that many organizations, people and media groups were calling her to feature on their shows to increase their own ratings.

=== Security concerns ===
Following the June 2016 meeting with Qawi, Qandeel held a press conference and reported that she received death threats both from him and from others, and demanded police protection from the state. At the end of June, images of Baloch's passport and national identity card were broadcast on the news, showing her hometown and father's name.

At around the same time, Baloch's ex-husband described in the media their brief marriage, revealing intimate details of their relationship. Baloch claimed her husband had been abusive, and cried publicly about the pain of the marriage. Around 14 July 2016, Baloch spoke by phone to a reporter from the Express Tribune and stated that she feared for her life. She told the reporter that she had sought protection from the police but on receiving no response, had decided to move abroad with her parents after the Eid al-Fitr holidays as she felt unsafe in Pakistan.

== Personal life ==
In 2008, at age 17, Baloch was married to a local man named Aashiq Hussain, her mother's cousin. She had a son with him. Her husband beat and tortured her, and after two years of marriage, she fled. (Baloch's mother, when preparing her daughter's body for her funeral, found cigarette burns on her arms.) She left her son with his father and moved to Karachi.

== Death ==
On 15 July 2016, Baloch was drugged and then asphyxiated by her brother M. Waseem while she was asleep at her parents' home in Multan. Her death was reported by her father Azeem. It was first reported as a shooting, but an autopsy report confirmed that Baloch was murdered by asphyxiation while she was asleep, on the night of 15–16 July, around 11:15 p.m. to 11:30 p.m. By the time her body was found, she had already been dead for between 15 and 36 hours. Marks on Baloch's body revealed that her mouth and nose were pinned shut to asphyxiate her. Police said that they would investigate all sides of the murder including honour killing.

A First Information Report against her brother Waseem and another brother Aslam Shaheen, who allegedly persuaded Waseem to kill their sister, was issued. Baloch's father Azeem stated in the FIR that his sons Aslam Shaheen and Waseem were responsible for their sister's death and had killed her for her money. Her father told the press "my daughter was brave and I will not forget or forgive her brutal murder."

Waseem was arrested on the evening of 16 July. He confessed to murdering his sister, saying "she [Qandeel Baloch] was bringing disrepute to our family's honour and I could not tolerate it any further. I killed her around 11:30 p.m. on Friday night when everyone else had gone to bed. My brother is not involved in the murder."

=== Murder case ===
The state was named as complainant in her murder case, making it impossible for the victim's family to pardon the perpetrator (see the Pakistani diyaa law). Mufti Abdul Qawi was named as an abettor in the case's First Information Report (FIR) by her father.

In September 2019, Baloch's brother Waseem was sentenced to life imprisonment for her murder.

In February 2022, Waseem's lawyer confirmed that the Pakistan appeals court had released Waseem three years after he was convicted of killing her for "bringing dishonor" to the family. The law in Pakistan at the time of Baloch's murder allowed a murder victim's family to pardon the killer, and Baloch's parents agreed to pardon their son for killing their daughter. Months after Baloch's murder, Pakistan's parliament passed legislation mandating imprisonment for perpetrators of honor killings, even if the victim's relatives forgave them.

=== Reactions ===
Baloch's murder was widely condemned by media celebrities and people around the globe, and incited controversy in Pakistan. Several personalities, including Madonna, Khloé Kardashian, Miley Cyrus, Jamie Lee Curtis, Rakhi Sawant, Imran Khan, Bilawal Bhutto Zardari, Sharmila Farooqi, Reham Khan, Sanam Baloch, Osman Khalid Butt, Meesha Shafi, Nadia Hussain, Ali Zafar, along with many others condemned the incident, including filmmaker and activist Sharmeen Obaid-Chinoy who said, "I really feel that no woman is safe in this country, until we start making examples of people, until we start sending men who kill women to jail, unless we literally say there will be no more killing and those who dare will spend the rest of their lives behind bars." She further said, "There is not a single day where you don't pick up a paper and see a woman hasn't been killed... this is an epidemic."

Then-British Prime Minister Theresa May also condemned the murder saying, "there is absolutely no honour in so-called honour killings and they should be referred to as acts of terror." May also said it was 'criminal' for women to be murdered by their male relatives on the grounds of defending family 'honour'. The daughter of the Pakistani ex-Prime Minister Maryam Nawaz announced that the government had finalized the draft law against honour killings in light of the negotiations and the final draft will be presented to a committee of joint session of parliament on 21 July for consideration and approval.”

Vigils for Baloch were held in Lahore and Karachi. On 2 November 2017, Baloch's father submitted an application to police alleging that his life was in danger from those who planned his daughter's murder.

== In popular culture ==
Baloch's death has drawn mixed reactions from different sections of society in Pakistan. Some called her death an honour killing, and some think that the motive was money. An episode in the A-Plus Entertainment series Yeh Junoon was partially based on her life. The series starred Zhalay Sarhadi and Shamoon Abbasi in lead roles.

On 27 July 2017, Urdu1 started to air a 28-episode biopic television drama titled Baaghi (meaning Rebel in Urdu) based on Qandeel's life, where Saba Qamar plays her character. The first episode amassed more than 4 million views on YouTube, and the series went on to become a major critical and commercial success.

In 2016, MangoBaaz reported that Qandeel Baloch was the most Googled person in Pakistan in 2016.

In March 2017, the British-Pakistani-Indian-American hip hop group Swet Shop Boys dedicated the track Aaja from their latest album to the memory of Qandeel Baloch. Recorded samples of her voice from her social media content is also used towards the end of the track.

In June 2017, a documentary film Undercover Asia S4: In The Name Of Honour premiered on Channel NewsAsia. Produced by Make Productions, it tells how Baloch's bold and sexual videos challenged convention and shocked a nation which later led to fatal consequences.

The 2023 film Wakhri is loosely based on Baloch’s case.

== See also ==
- The Sensational Life & Death of Qandeel Baloch
- Victim blaming
- Women's rights in Pakistan
- Honour killing in Pakistan

- 2012 Kohistan video case
- Stoning of Farzana Parveen
- Samia Sarwar
- Death of Samia Shahid
- Ayman Udas

- Tara Fares
