= Women in Islam =

The experiences of Muslim women (Arabic: مسلمات, romanized: Muslimāt, singular مسلمة, Muslimah) vary widely between and within different societies, both present and historically, due to cultures and values that were often predating Islam's introduction to the respective regions of the world. At the same time, their adherence to Islam is a shared factor that affects their lives to a varying degree and gives them a common identity that may serve to bridge the wide cultural, social, and economic differences between Muslim women.

Among the influences which have played an important role in defining the social, legal, spiritual, and cosmological status of women in the course of Islamic history are the sacred scriptures of Islam: the Quran; the ḥadīth, which are traditions relating to the deeds and aphorisms attributed to the Islamic prophet Muhammad and his companions; ijmā', which is a scholarly consensus, expressed or tacit, on a question of law; qiyās, the principle by which the laws of the Quran and the sunnah or prophetic custom are applied to situations not explicitly covered by these two sources of legislation; and fatwā, non-binding published opinions or decisions regarding religious doctrine or points of law. In the Islamic understanding, children are not held responsible; gender roles, obligations or restrictions become clear when a person reaches the age of maturity.

Islam considers men and women to be inherently different (although equal on a spiritual level), and thus have different responsibilities; the fulfillment of these responsibilities is a major part of the Islamic concept of justice. Women are required to complete all the duties of a Muslim worshiper, including the completion of religious traditions, specifically the pilgrimage to Mecca except for some religious duties such as Friday prayers. Islamic culture marked a movement towards liberation and equality for women, since prior Arab cultures did not enable women to have such freedoms. Muhammad asked women for advice and took their thoughts into account, specifically with regard to the Quran. Women were allowed to pray with men, take part in commercial interactions, and played a role in education.

Some legal provisions in the Quran also differentiate by gender. For example, a verse on financial testimony notes that two women may be called as witnesses alongside one man "lest one of them errs, the other can remind her" (Quran 2:282), a passage scholars have read both as reflecting the social context of 7th-century Arabia and as a broader statement on women's reliability as witnesses.

A widely cited hadith frames a husband's treatment of his wife as a marker of faith. The Prophet Muhammad is reported to have said, "The believers who show the most perfect faith are those who have the best behaviour, and the best of you are those who are best to their wives" (Sunan al-Tirmidhi, Hadith 1162).

Additional influences include pre-Islamic cultural traditions; secular laws, which are fully accepted in Islam so long as they do not directly contradict Islamic precepts; religious authorities, including government-controlled agencies such as the Indonesian Ulema Council and Turkey's Diyanet; and spiritual teachers, which are particularly prominent in Islamic mysticism or Sufism. Many of the latter, including the medieval Muslim philosopher Ibn Arabi, have themselves produced texts that have elucidated the metaphysical symbolism of the feminine principle in Islam.

== Interactions and sources of law ==
In pre-Islamic Arabian culture, marriage was generally contracted in accordance with the larger needs of the tribe and was based on the need to form alliances within the tribe and with other tribes. Virginity at the time of marriage was emphasized as a tribal honor. Historian William Montgomery Watt states that all of Muhammad's marriages had the political aspect of strengthening friendly relationships and were based on the pre-Islamic Arabian custom.

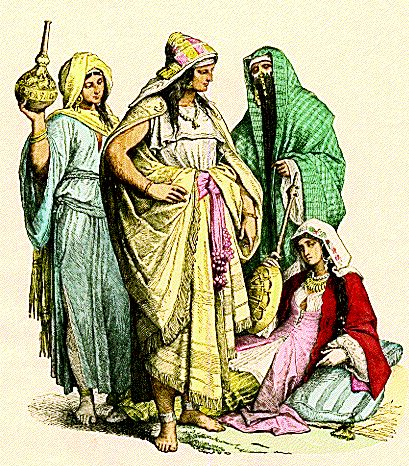
Early costumes of (Free) Arab women; It can provide clues in understanding some of the Quranic Urf related emphases such as ma'ruf and munkar as well as sunnah and bid'a on favored female dressing. (Note: A verse that demonstrates that the Quran is not overly concerned with form is found in Surah Al-A'raf-26; "O Children of Adam! We have bestowed upon you a garment to cover your shame and adornment. But the garment of taqwa is the best of all. That is one of the signs of Allah, so that they may remember.") (Note: Sunnah originally meant a tradition that did not contain the definition of good and bad. Later, "good traditions" began to be referred to as sunnah and the concept of "Muhammad's sunnah" was established.)

=== Primary ===
Women (Arabic: Sūrat an-Nisāʼ) is the fourth chapter of the Quran. The title of the surah derives from the numerous references to women throughout the chapter, including verses 4:34 and 4:127—4:130. Maryam also takes its name from Mary. The Quran contains some verses that are presented by Islamic modernism as emphasizing the equality of men and women; that men and women have moral agency and that both will receive their rewards in the afterlife.

Surely 'for' Muslim men and women, believing men and women, devout men and women, truthful men and women, patient men and women, humble men and women, charitable men and women, fasting men and women, men and women who guard their chastity, and men and women who remember Allah often, for 'all of' them Allah has prepared forgiveness and a great reward. (Qur'an 33:35).

Within Sunni Islam, women are provided a number of guidelines prescribed by the Quran and ḥadīth literature, as understood by fiqh (Islamic jurisprudence), as well as under the interpretations derived from the ḥadīth that were agreed upon by the majority of Sunni Muslim scholars as authentic beyond doubt based on ḥadīth studies. Qur'anic interpretations and their application were shaped by the historical context of the Muslim world at the time they were written.

=== Secondary ===
The above primary sources of influence on women of Islam may not deal with every single conceivable situation over time. This led to the development of jurisprudence and religious schools with Islamic scholars that referred to resources such as identifying authentic documents, internal discussions, and establishing a consensus to find the correct religiously approved course of action for Muslims. These formed the secondary sources of influence for women. Among them are ijmā', qiyās, ijtihad, and others, depending on the sect and the corresponding schools of Islamic law. Included in secondary sources are the fatwā, which are often widely distributed, orally or in writing by Muslim clerics, to the masses in the local language and describe behavior, roles, and rights of women that conform to religious requirements. Fatwa are theoretically non-binding, but seriously considered and have often been practiced by most Muslims. The secondary sources classify the lawful and unlawful behaviors of Muslim men and women, which typically fall into the five categories (al-ahkam al-khamsa): wajib/fard (obligatory), mustahabb/mandub (recommended), mubah (neutral), makruh (disapproved), and haram (forbidden). There is considerable controversy, change over time, and conflict between the secondary sources.

== Gender roles and the position of women in Islamic community ==
Islam's basic view of women and men postulates a complementarity of functions: like everything else in the universe, humanity has been created in a pair (Sūrat al-Dhāriyāt, 51:49) – neither can be complete without the other. "In Islamic cosmological thinking, the universe is perceived as an equilibrium built on harmonious polar relationships between the pairs that make up all things. Moreover, all outward phenomena are reflections of inward noumena and ultimately of God."

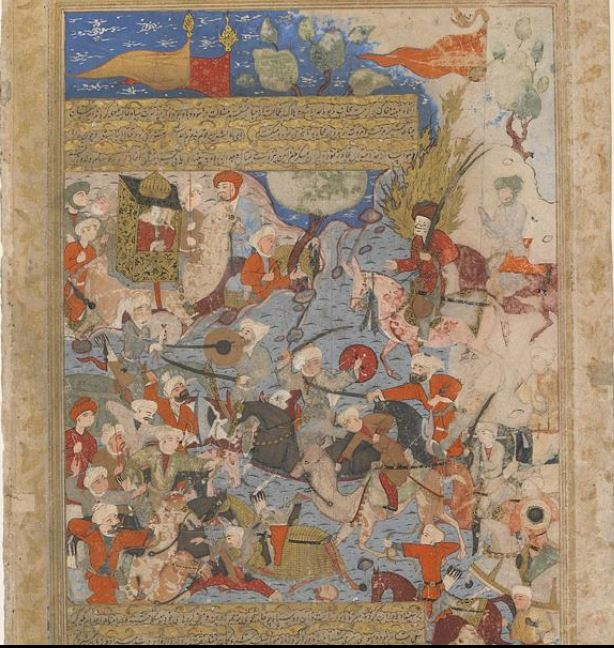
A 15th century Persian miniature depicting the Battle of the Camel narrative, between 'Alī, and Aisha, after Ali's victory, Aisha withdrew from politics. Traditionalists used this story to argue that women should not play an active political role, while modernists used it to argue for gender equality, which they believed existed within the Islamic tradition.

The emphasis that Islam places upon the feminine/masculine polarity (and therefore complementarity) results in a separation of social functions. In general, a woman's sphere of operation is the home in which she is the dominant figure – and a man's corresponding sphere is the outside world. Women are highly respected in many aspects of domestic life such as being praised for their knowledge as ritual specialists, healers, caretakers, and those who arrange marriages in their community. However, this separation is not, in practice, as rigid as it appears. There are many examples – both in the early history of Islam and in the contemporary world – of Muslim women who have played prominent roles in public life, including being sultanas, queens, elected heads of state, and wealthy businesswomen. Moreover, it is important to recognize that in Islam, home and family are firmly situated at the centre of life in this world and of society: a man's work cannot take precedence over the private realm.

Contrary to main Islamic gender role concepts; some concubines, mothers, sisters and grandmothers of the sultans of the Ottoman Empire exerted extraordinary political influence in a period called 'Sultanate of Women'. Their power was not challenged by the ulema clergy. In some Turkish Sufi interpretations of Islam, such as Alevism, prevalent gender roles and gender segregation does not exist in any aspects including religious rituals and clergy. Historically, a marriage constituted a form of ownership or dominion: a husband wielded exclusive control over his wife's sexual (and when she was free, reproductive) capacity; controlled her mobility; paid her dower, as if he were paying a purchase price; and gained the unilateral right to dissolve the marriage, a right similar to a slaveholder's power of manumission.

== Modern debate on the status of women in Islam ==
Within the Muslim community, conservatives and Islamic feminists have used Islamic doctrine as the basis for discussion of women's rights, drawing on the Quran, the hadith, and the lives of prominent women in the early period of Muslim history as evidence. Where conservatives have seen evidence that existing gender asymmetries are divinely ordained, feminists have seen more egalitarian ideals in early Islam. Still, others have argued that this discourse is essentialist and ahistorical, and have urged that Islamic doctrine not be the only framework within which discussion occurs.

=== Conservatives and the Islamic movement ===
Conservatives reject the assertion that different laws prescribed for men and women imply that men are more valuable than women. Ali ibn Musa Al-reza reasoned that at the time of marriage a man has to pay something to his prospective bride, and that men are responsible for both their wives' and their own expenses but women have no such responsibility.

Dr. Mustafa Khattab in his book The Clear Quran writes:

The Quran makes it clear that men and women are equal before God and the Law (16:97 and 33:35). Abuses against some Muslim women (e.g. honour killing and forced marriages) are cultural practices in some Muslim countries that contradict Islamic teachings.

The nebulous revivalist movement termed Islamism is one of the most dynamic movements within Islam in the 20th and 21st centuries. The experience of women in Islamist states has been varied. The progression of Muslim women's rights has been inhibited by religious extremist groups that use the disempowerment of women as a political agenda. When women are opposed to these infringements on their rights they are often subjected to abuse, violence, and shunned. Women in Taliban-controlled Afghanistan faced treatment condemned by the international community. Women were forced to wear the burqa in public, not allowed to work, not allowed to be educated after the age of eight, and faced public flogging and execution for violations of the Taliban's laws. The position of women in Iran, which has been a theocracy since its 1979 revolution, is more complex. Iranian Islamists are ideologically in favour of allowing female legislators in Iran's parliament and 60% of university students are women.

=== Liberal Islam, Islamic feminism, and other progressive criticism ===
After the September 11, 2001, attacks, international attention was focused on the condition of women in the Muslim world. Some critics noted gender inequality and criticized Muslim societies for condoning this treatment. Liberal Muslims advocate using critical thinking ijtihad to evolve a more progressive form of Islam regarding women's status. Islamic feminists seek gender equality and social justice within an Islamic context, drawing from both Islamic and global feminist values trying to align both. Some emphasize the adaptable nature of Sharia law, suggesting it can safeguard women's rights with political will.

In response to growing civil rights for secular women, some Muslim women have advocated for their rights within Islamic societies. Malaysia serves as an example, where dual legal systems exist for secular and Sharia laws. In 2006, Marina Mahathir, daughter of Malaysia's former Prime Minister Mahathir Mohamad, criticized unequal treatment of Malaysia's Muslim women in an editorial in the Malaysia Star. She highlighted legal disparities like polygamy's legality and biased child custody arrangements, which favored fathers for Muslims compared to shared-custody norms among non-Muslim parents. Women's groups in Malaysia began campaigning in the 1990s to have female Sharia judges appointed to the Sharia legal system in the country, and in 2010 two female judges were appointed.

== Women versus Sharia and tradition ==
Use, by country, of Sharia for legal matters relating to women: Sharia plays no role in the judicial system. Sharia applies to Muslims in personal status issues only. Sharia is also used in criminal law. Regional variations in the application of Sharia

According to all schools of Islamic law, the injunctions of Sharia apply to all Muslims, male and female, who have reached the age of maturity and only to them. The Quran especially emphasizes that its injunctions concern both men and women in several verses where both are addressed clearly and in a distinct manner, such as in Sūrat al-Aḥzāb at 33:35 ('Verily, men who surrender unto God, and women who surrender...').

Most Muslim-majority countries, and some countries with a considerable population of Muslim minorities, follow a mixed legal system, with positive laws and state courts, as well as sharia-based religious laws and religious courts. Those countries that use sharia for legal matters involving women, adopt it mostly for personal law; however, a few Islamic countries such as Saudi Arabia, Iran, Afghanistan, Pakistan and Yemen also have sharia-based criminal laws.

According to Jan Michiel Otto, "[a]nthropological research shows that people in local communities often do not distinguish clearly whether and to what extent their norms and practices are based on local tradition, tribal custom, or religion." In some areas, tribal practices such as vani, Ba'ad and "honor" killing remain an integral part of the customary legal processes involving Muslim women. In turn, article 340 of the Jordanian Penal Code, which reduces sentences for killing female relatives over adultery, and is commonly believed to be derived from Islamic law, was in fact borrowed from French criminal law during the Ottoman era.

Other than applicable laws to Muslim women, there is gender-based variation in the process of testimony and acceptable forms of evidence (See below) in legal matters. Some Islamic jurists have held that certain types of testimony by women may not be accepted. In other cases, the testimony of two women equals that of one man.

=== Dress code ===
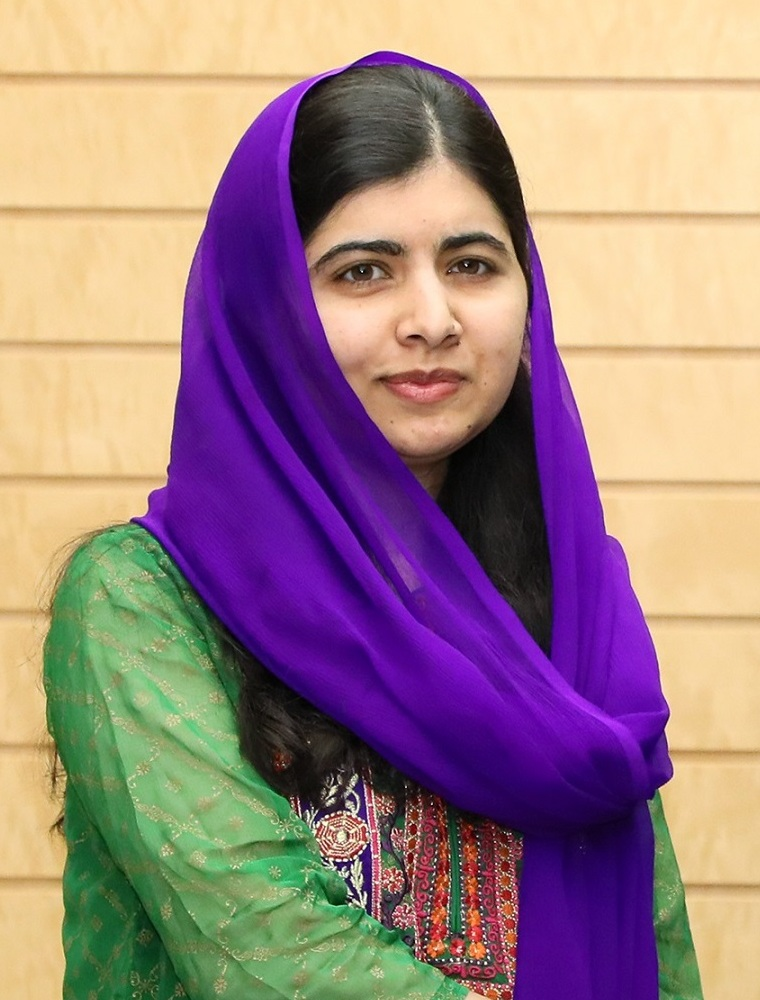
Malala Yousafzai, Pakistani education activist and 2014 Nobel Peace Prize laureate, choosing a loose head scarf.

A verse in the Surah Al-A'raf-26 gives the simplest and most fundamental purpose of dressing as covering one's ugly parts and emphasizes that fear of God is more important than covering oneself. Meanwhile modesty is exalted in the Islamic understanding, the opposite behavior is despised as fahisha by Islamic scholars alike as emblematic of a state of spiritual ignorance Jahiliyyah. In the specific context of women, the Quran at 24:31 speaks of women not to reveal their "ornaments" other than what is naturally visible for strangers outside the family, with expression -ornament- interpreted by some scholars as the female body with the potential to encompass the entire body.

All orthodox schools of Sharia law prescribe covering the body in public: specifically, to the neck, the ankles, and below the elbow. However, none of the traditional legal systems actually stipulate that women must wear a veil: It is only the wives of Muḥammad who are instructed to wear this article of clothing (33:59). Historically, the awrah for a slave woman during the era of slavery in the Muslim world, who according to Islamic law was a non-Muslim, was different than that of the awrah of a free Muslim woman. The awrah of a female slave was defined as being between her navel and her knee. Consequently, slave women during the era of slavery in the Muslim world did not wear the hijab, and could be displayed with a bare chest.

There is no doubt that some of the veiling-based clothing styles in the Islamic world were inherited from pre-Islamic Near Eastern societies. The practice of veiling is believed to have originated in Ancient Greece. Iconography of the Virgin Mary in Christian art invariably shows her with her hair covered, and this tradition was followed in the modern era by both Georgian and Armenian Christians, as well as Oriental Jewishwomen; Catholic women did not attend church without covering their heads until the late twentieth century. Covering the hair was considered a natural part of life by women, a sign of modesty and, especially, a sign of reverence for God.

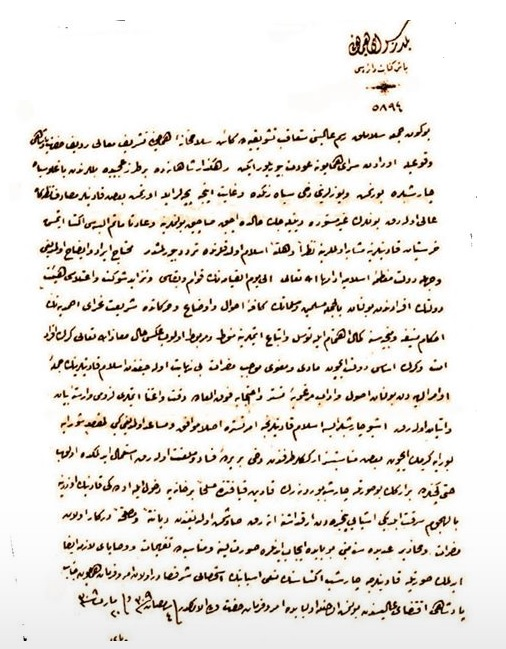
Abdulhamid II's decree dated April 2, 1892, prohibited by the wearing of Çarşaf.

In the twenty-first century, there continues to be tremendous variance in how Muslim women dress, not least because the Islamic world is so geographically and culturally diverse. Laws passed in states (such as laïcist Turkey and Tunisia) with twentieth-century Westernization campaigns —which mandated that women wear "modern", Western-style clothing in the institutions where they work as civil servants- have been relaxed in recent years; similarly, the end of communism in Albania and the Yugoslav republics also meant an end to highly restrictive secular apparel legislation. As a result, it is now legal for women in these countries to wear clothes suggesting a modern Islamic identity—such as the headscarf colloquially known as the ḥijāb—in public, though not necessarily in all public institutions or offices of state.

Conversely, in a handful of states—notably Shia Iran—with modernist fundamentalist regimes, dress codes which became mandatory in the latter part of the twentieth-century, stipulating that women wear exclusively "religious", as opposed to "secular", garments in public are still in force. However, these countries are both theologically and culturally atypical within the Islamic world: Iran is the world's only Shī'a revolutionary state and in none of the others do the same restrictions on women's clothing in public apply, as the overwhelming majority of Muslim-majority countries have no laws mandating the public wearing of either secular or religious apparel. This issue has the potential to be a deeply controversial topic not only from a human rights perspective but also from an international legal perspective, as it undermines the principle of impartiality, such as judging by individuals who wear clothing that also carries religious symbolism.

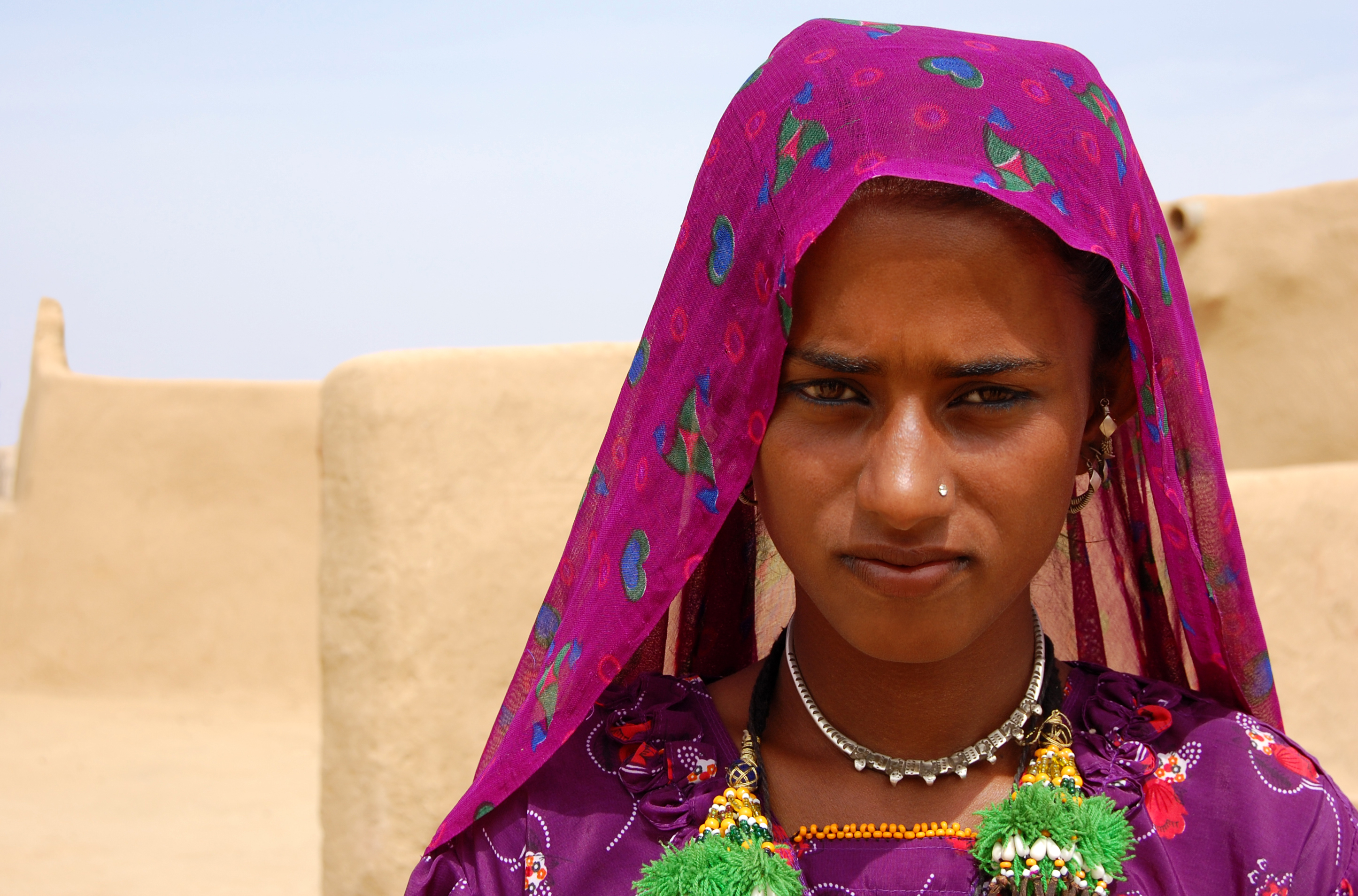
A young Muslim woman in the Thar desert near Jaisalmer, India. Veils are also known traditionally to provide sun protection.

In a 2018 study done by the Institute for Social Policy and Understanding, Muslim American women were, "the most likely" when compared to other domestic religious communities to, "wear a visible symbol that makes their faith identity known to others." Of the Muslim women surveyed by ISPU, 46% say they wear a visible symbol to mark their faith in public all the time (this includes the hijab), 19% some of the time, and 35% none of the time. The study did not find there to be any significant age or race difference.

The question of why Muslim women wear the hijab is still met with a variety of responses by Muslim American women, including the most popular, "piety and to please God" (54%), "so others know they are Muslim" (21%), and "for modesty" (12%). Only 1% said they wore it, "because a family member or spouse required it".

=== Gender segregation ===
While Islam has sometimes been lauded for a historically more progressive portrayal of women, there are differing viewpoints on the fairness of its personal status laws and criminal code as they pertain to women. Certain values and interpretations continue to be a subject of debate, with the understanding that these values exhibit variations within the diverse contexts of different countries with Muslim majorities. Generally, however, male and female rights differ according to Islamic personal status laws. Some Islamic legal traditions allow men to engage in polygamy and marry non-Muslim women belonging to Christianity and Judaism, while women are generally restricted from having multiple husbands and marrying non-Muslim men. Additionally, female inheritances are typically half of their male siblings'. Islamic criminal jurisprudence when it comes to Hudud punishment reliew heavily on witness testimony, and female testimonies alone are often not considered sufficient to convict a murderer, requiring a male testimony for validation in Hudud punishments but not for Ta'zir punishments which don't require witnesses

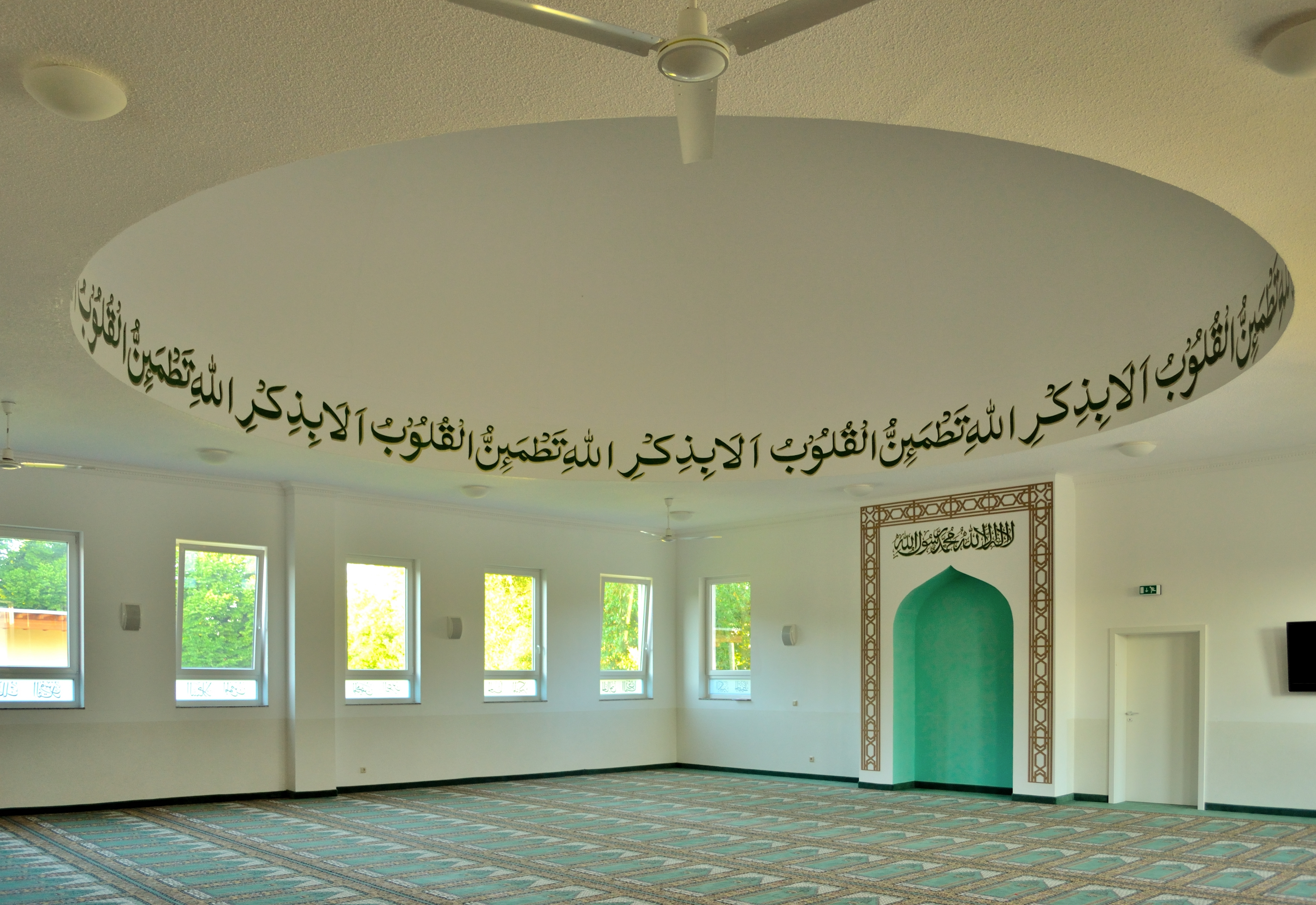
The ladies' prayer hall in the Khadija Mosque in Berlin; upper part reads: Only in the remembrance of Allah will your hearts find peace (in Arabic)

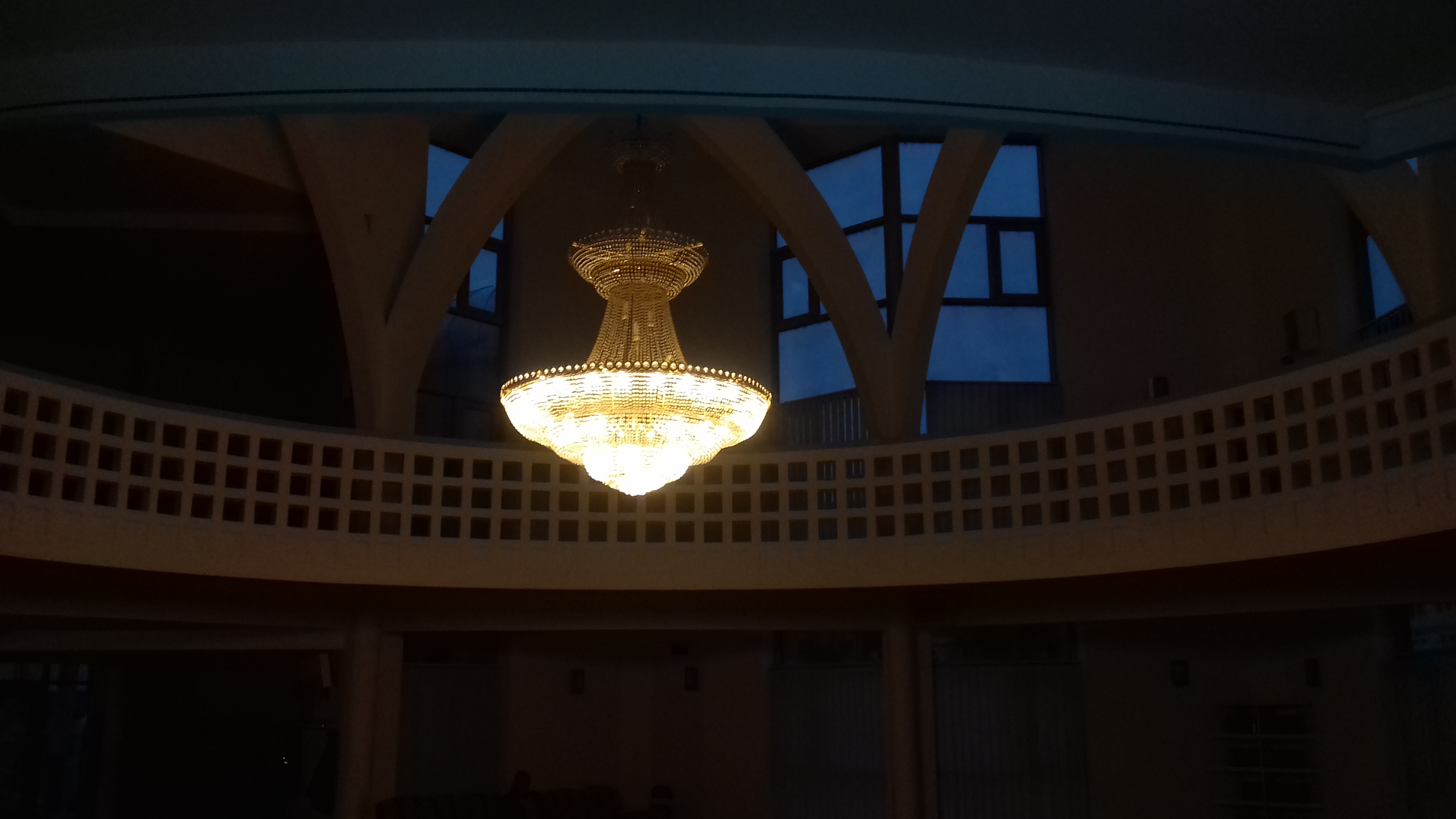
Makhphil (makfil), upper gallery plateau part of Bosnian mosques reserved only for women (except when Jumu'ah) who climb to it by stairs at side(s) of entrance; White/Nasser's mosque in Zenica

Mahnaz Afkhami writes that the Islamic fundamentalist worldview "singles out women's status and her relations to society as the supreme test of the authenticity of the Islamic order." This is symbolized by the institutions of purdah (physical separation of the sexes) and awrah (concealing the body with clothing). As in much of the world, institutions suppressing women were becoming less powerful until the resurgence of Islamic fundamentalism at the end of the 20th century. Walid Phares writes that Marxism in the Soviet Union and China, as well as "secular anticlericalism" in Turkey forced women to "integrate themselves into an antireligious society" resulting in a backlash of "gender apartheid" by Islamic fundamentalists. He notes that other religions also have "witnessed similar historical struggles."

Some Turkish Sufi orders do not follow gender segregation. For example; an unveiled female figure, Cemalnur Sargut, currently leads the Turkish branch of the Rifaʽi order. Similarly, The Bektashi order allows women to fill in religious roles or become dervishes. The incumbent head of the 'Alevi/Bektashi Culture Presidency' of Turkey is a female, Esma Ersin.

==== In prayer ====
There are location-variations for women within mosques and congregations. Within some Islamic schools and branches, there are specific prayer variations for women. Women are ordered not to pray during their menstruation and for a length of time after childbirth (postpartum period). A majority of mosques worldwide have dedicated ladies-only prayer spaces. These include mosques in Muslim-majority countries like Indonesia, Malaysia, Turkey, Saudi Arabia and the United Arab Emirates, as well as mosques in countries where Muslims are a minority group, like Singapore, South Korea, Japan and the United States. In accordance with Islamic tradition, there is a practice of creating separate prayer spaces for men and women within mosques, which is derived from Hadith literature, including Sahih Muslim. Additionally, it is recorded that Muhammad encouraged the construction of separate entrances for men and women in mosques. This recommendation aimed to provide convenience and maintain a sense of propriety by allowing men and women to enter and exit the mosque without mingling through the same entrance.

== Legal matters ==
=== Witness of woman ===
The following statement in the Quran is thought to be the general rule for finiancial cases in Islamic jurisprudence; O believers! When you contract a loan for a fixed period of time, commit it to writing....with justice. Call upon two of your men to witness. If two men cannot be found, then one man and two women of your choice will witness so if one of the women forgets the other may remind her.^{[Quran 4:11]}

=== Travel ===
A Muslim woman is not allowed to travel unless she is accompanied by a Mahram (husband or any other relative who she is prohibited from marrying).

=== Property rights ===
For men is a share from what the parents and near relatives leave, and for women is a share from what the parents and near relative leave from less from it or more, a legal share. (Al-Quran 4:7)

The Quran grants inheritance rights to wife, daughter, and sisters of the deceased. However, women's inheritance rights to her father's property are unequal to her male siblings, and varies based on number of sisters, stepsisters, stepbrothers, whether the mother is surviving, and other claimants. The Qur'an does not explicitly mention the shares of male relatives, such as the decedent's son, but provides the rule that the son's share must be twice that of the daughter's. Muslim theologians explain this aspect of inheritance by looking at Islamic law in its entirety, which bestows the responsibility and accountability on men to provide safety, protection and sustenance to women.^{[Qur'an 4:34]}. A woman, according to Islamic tradition, does not have to give her pre-marriage possessions to her husband and receive a mahr (dower) which she then owns. Furthermore, any earnings that a woman receives through employment or business, after marriage, is hers to keep and need not contribute towards family expenses. This is because, once the marriage is consummated, in exchange for tamkin (sexual submission), a woman is entitled to nafaqa—namely, the financial responsibility for reasonable housing, food and other household expenses for the family, including the spouse, falls entirely on the husband. In traditional Islamic law, a woman is also not responsible for the upkeep of the home and may demand payment for any work she does in the domestic sphere.

Property rights enabled some Muslim women to possess substantial assets and fund charitable endowments. In mid-sixteenth century Istanbul, 36.8% of charitable endowments (awqāf) were founded by women. In eighteenth century Cairo, 126 out of 496 charitable foundations (25.4%) were endowed by women. Between 1770 and 1840, 241 out of 468 or 51% of charitable endowments in Aleppo were founded by women. Bernard Lewis says that classical Islamic civilization granted free Muslim women relatively more property rights than women in the West, even as it sanctified three basic inequalities between master and slave, man and woman, believer and unbeliever. Even in cases where property rights were granted in the West, they were very limited and covered only upper-class women. Over time, while women's rights have improved elsewhere, those in many Muslim-dominated countries have remained comparatively restricted.

=== Sexual crimes and sins ===
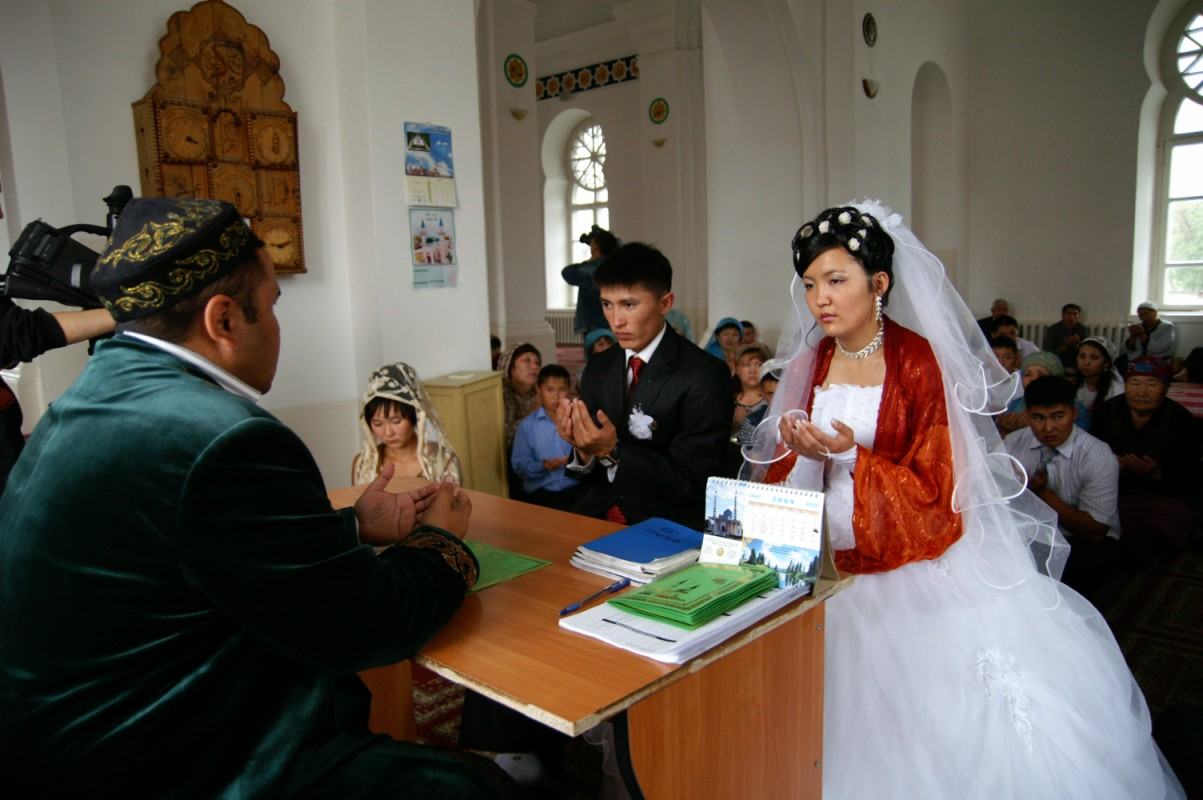
A Kazakh wedding ceremony in a mosque

==== Zina ====
Zina is an Islamic legal term referring to unlawful sexual intercourse. According to traditional jurisprudence, zina can include adultery (of married parties), fornication (of unmarried parties), prostitution, bestiality, and, according to some scholars, rape. The Quran disapproved of the promiscuity prevailing in Arabia at the time, and several verses refer to unlawful sexual intercourse, including one that prescribes the punishment of 100 lashes for fornicators. Zina thus belong to the class of hadd (pl. hudud) crimes, which have Quranically specified punishments.

Although stoning for zina is not mentioned in the Quran, all schools of traditional jurisprudence agreed on the basis of hadith that it is to be punished by stoning if the offender is muhsan (adult, free, Muslim, and having been married), with some extending this punishment to certain other cases and milder punishment prescribed in other scenarios. The offenders must have acted of their own free will. According to traditional jurisprudence, zina must be proved by testimony of four adult, pious eyewitnesses to the actual act of penetration, or a confession repeated four times and not retracted later. Any Muslim who accuses another Muslim of zina but fails to produce the required witnesses commits the crime of false accusation (qadhf, القذف). Some contend that this Sharia requirement of four eyewitnesses severely limits a man's ability to prove zina charges against women, a crime often committed without eyewitnesses. Unlike the other legal schools or Madhhabs the Maliki legal school allows unmarried woman's pregnancy to be used as evidence, but the punishment can be averted by a number of legal "semblances" (shubuhat), such as existence of an invalid marriage contract. These requirements made zina virtually impossible to prove in practice.

Aside from "a few rare and isolated" instances from the pre-modern era and several recent cases, there is no historical record of stoning for zina being legally carried out. Zina became a more pressing issue in modern times, as Islamist movements and governments employed polemics against public immorality. After sharia-based criminal laws were widely replaced by European-inspired statutes in the modern era, in recent decades several countries passed legal reforms that incorporated elements of hudud laws into their legal codes. Iran witnessed several highly publicized stonings for zina in the aftermath of the Islamic revolution. In Nigeria local courts have passed several stoning sentences, all of which were overturned on appeal or left unenforced. While the harsher punishments of the Hudood Ordinances have never been applied in Pakistan, in 2005 Human Rights Watch reported that over 200,000 zina cases against women were underway at various levels in Pakistan's legal system.

==== Qazf and Li'an ====
In 'qazf' when someone accuses a chaste woman without four witnesses then he is to be punished with being flogged with eighty lashes. His testimony will become inadmissible forever unless he repents and improves (24:4–5)

However, in 'lian', when the husband accuses the wife of adultery without witnesses, he have to swear five times each to support his case. If he takes oaths she is to be punished with stoning unless she too takes oaths in similar way to support her case, her oaths are upheld over his and she will not be punished(24:6–9).

==== Rape ====
Rape can be defined as: "Forcible illegal sexual intercourse by a man with a woman who is not legally married to him, without her free will and consent". Islamic primary law sources, like the legal systems of classical antiquity and the ancient Near East, does not contain a true equivalent of the modern concept of rape, which based on the modern notions of individual inviolability of the body. Classical jurisprudence, attempted to fill this gap by likening rape to defined crimes such as adultery and hirabah. However, some distinctions were made between rape and adultery.

In the case of rape, the adult male perpetrator (i.e. rapist) of such an act is to receive the ḥadd zinā, but the non-consenting or invalidly consenting female (i.e. rape victim) is to be regarded as innocent of zinā and relieved of the ḥadd punishment. According to Oliver Leaman, the required testimony of four male witnesses having seen the actual penetration applies to illicit sexual relations (i.e. adultery and fornication), not to rape.

Rape charges can be brought and a case proven based on the sole testimony of the victim, providing that circumstantial evidence supports the allegations. ..... It (requirements for proof of rape as zina) happens either due to misinterpretation of the intricacies of the Sharia laws governing these matters, or cultural traditions; or due to corruption and blatant disregard of the law, or indeed some combination of these phenomena.

In Dubai, some women who made accusations of rape with a lack of proof have been charged with fornication or adultery however Dubai later amended there laws which rape victims won't be charged for fornication and adultery due to a lack of proof.

=== Domestic violence ===
The relationship between Islam and domestic violence is disputed by some Islamic scholars. Some Muslims, such as Islamic feminist groups, argue that Muslim men misuse the text as an excuse for domestic violence.

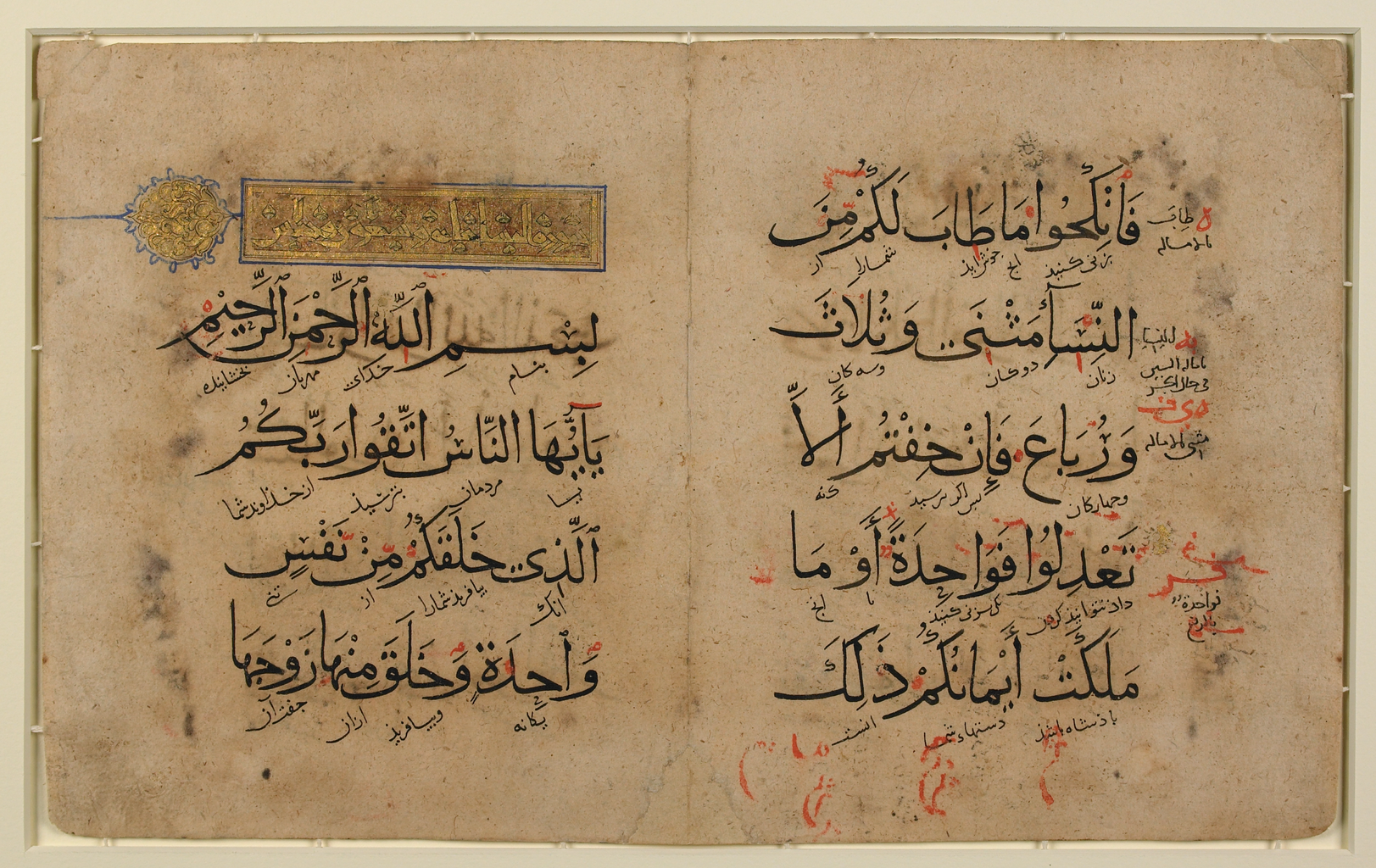
A fragment of Sūrat an-Nisā' – a chapter of Islam's sacred text entitled 'Women' – featuring the Persian, Arabic, and Kufic scripts.

Men are the caretakers of women, as men have been provisioned by Allah over women and tasked with supporting them financially. And righteous women are devoutly obedient and, when alone, protective of what Allah has entrusted them with. And if you sense ill-conduct from your women, advise them, do not share their beds, and strike them. But if they change their ways, do not be unjust to them...... If you anticipate a split between them, appoint a mediator from his family and another from hers.....Surah An-Nisa 4:34-35

In the Quran, women are expected to submit to their husbands, and husbands are permitted to enforce this hierarchy through physical violence. (Note: Sinai: Thus, women are expected to be obedient to their husbands...and the Qur’an even permits husbands, as an ultima ratio, to enforce this expectation by physical violence.) There are a number of translations of this verse from the Arabic original, and all vary to some extent. The word w'aḍribūhunna in this verse which is understood as "beating" or "hitting" in English— is derived from the Arabic root word ḍaraba, which has over fifty derivations and definitions, including "to separate', "to oscillate" and "to play music". The common conservative interpretations translate and understand the word to mean as strike or beat in this verse. Some scholars claim that Quran allows and domestic violence against women, when a husband suspects nushuz (disobedience, disloyalty, rebellion, ill conduct) in his wife. Other scholars claim wife beating, for nashizah, is not consistent with modern perspectives of Quran. Some conservative translations suggest Muslim husbands are permitted to use light force on their wives, and others claim permissibly to strike them with a Miswak and chastise them.(فَاضْرِبُوهُنَّ ضَرْبًا غَيْرَ مُبَرِّحٍ fadribuhunna darban ghayra mubarrih; literal translation: "beat them, a beating without severity") When asked by Ibn Abbas, the cousin and companion of Muhammad, Ibn Abbas replied back: "I asked Ibn Abbas: 'What is the hitting that is Ghayr Al-Mubarrih (Without Severity) ?' He replied [with] the siwak (teeth-cleaning twig) and the like'.

There have been several fatwas and hadiths against domestic violence; The Lebanese educator and journalist 'Abd al-Qadir al-Maghribi argued that perpetrating acts of domestic violence goes against Muḥammad's own example and injunction. In his 1928 essay, Muḥammad and Woman, al-Maghribi said: "He [Muḥammad] prohibited a man from beating his wife and noted that beating was not appropriate for the marital relationship between them". Muḥammad underlined the moral and logical inconsistency in beating one's wife during the day and then praising her at night as a prelude to conjugal relations. According to another tradition, he forbade the beating of any woman with the words, "Never beat God's handmaidens."'

Jonathan A.C. Brown gives some tendency examples across the Sunni schools of law on the 'Wife Beating Verse'. Ata' bin Abi Rabah, counseled a husband not to beat his wife even if she ignored him but rather to express his anger in some other way. Darimi, a teacher of both Tirmidhi and Muslim bin Hajjaj as well as a leading early scholar in Iran, collected all the Hadiths showing Muhammad's disapproval of beating in a chapter entitled 'The Prohibition on Striking Women'. A thirteenth-century scholar from Granada, Ibn Faras, notes that one camp of ulama had staked out a stance forbidding striking a wife altogether, declaring it contrary to Muhammad's example and denying the authenticity of any Hadiths that seemed to permit beating. Even Ibn Hajar, the pillar of late medieval Sunni Hadith scholarship, concludes that, contrary to what seems to be an explicit command in the Quran, the hadiths of Muhammad leave no doubt that striking one's wife to discipline her actually falls under the Sharia ruling of 'strongly disliked' or 'disliked verging on prohibited.

In recent years, numerous prominent scholars in the tradition of "orthodox Islam" have issued fatwas (legal opinions) against domestic violence. These include Muhammad Asad, the Shī'ite scholar Mohammed Hussein Fadlallah, who promulgated a fatwa on the occasion of the International Day for the Elimination of Violence Against Women in 2007, which states that Islam forbids men from exercising any form of violence against women; Shakyh Muhammad Hisham Kabbani, the Chairman of the Islamic Supreme Council of America, who co-authored The Prohibition of Domestic Violence in Islam (2011) with Homayra Ziad; and Cemalnur Sargut, the president of the Turkish Women's Cultural Association (TÜRKKAD), who has stated that men who engage in domestic violence "in a sense commit polytheism (shirk)": "Such people never go on a diet to curb the desires of their ego...[Conversely] In his Mathnawi Rumi says love for women is because of witnessing Allah as reflected in the mirror of their being. According to tasawwuf, woman is the light of Allah's beauty shed onto this earth. Again in [the] Mathanawi Rumi says a man who is wise and fine-spirited is understanding and compassionate towards a woman, and never wants to hurt or injure her."

==== Current status ====
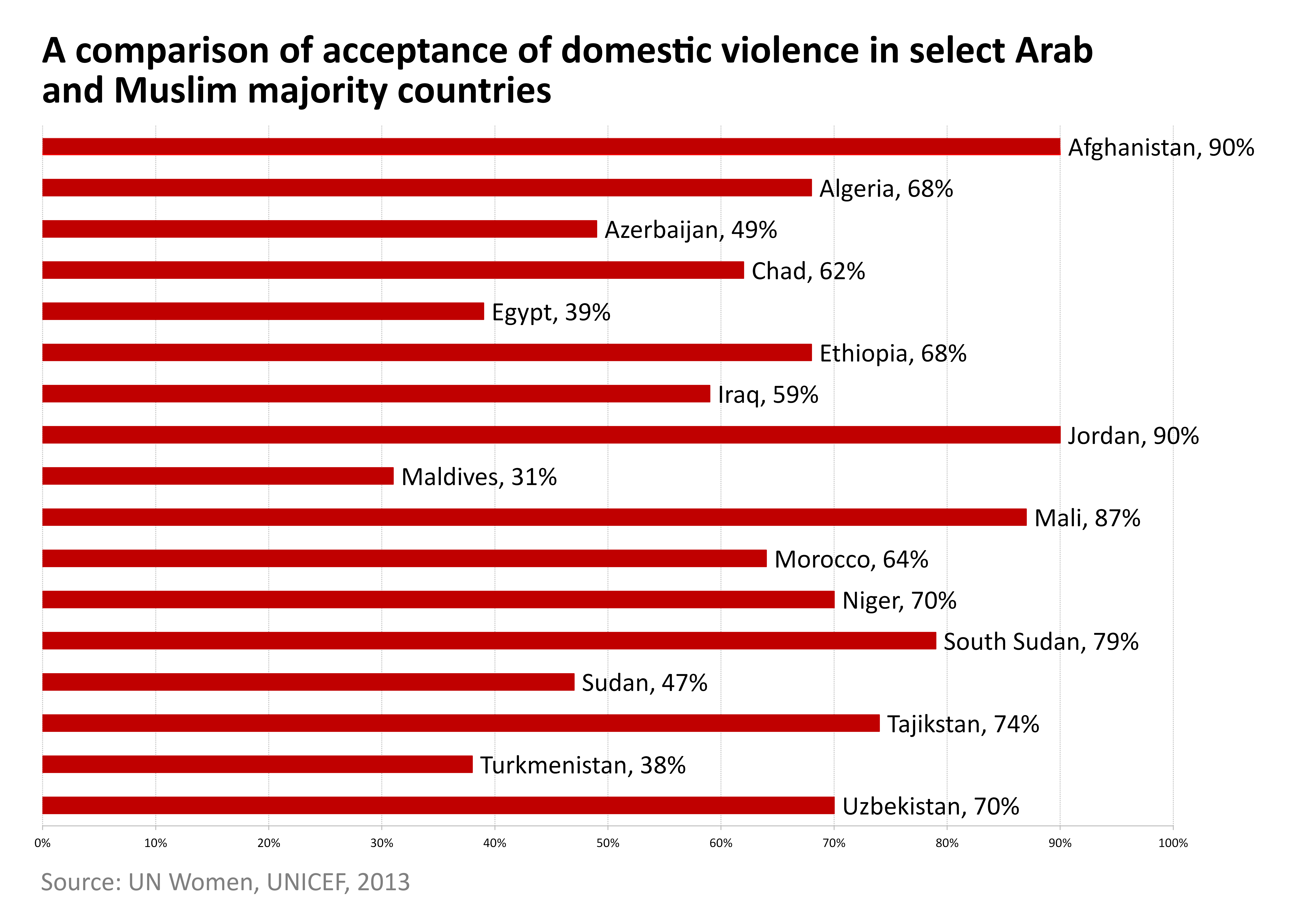
Acceptance of domestic violence by women in some Islamic countries, according to UNICEF (2013)

In practice, the legal doctrine of many Islamic nations, in deference to Sharia law, have refused to include, consider or prosecute cases of domestic violence, limiting legal protections available to Muslim women. In 2010, for example, the highest court of United Arab Emirates (Federal Supreme Court) considered a lower court's ruling, and upheld a husband's right to "chastise" his wife and children with physical violence. Article 53 of the United Arab Emirates' penal code acknowledges the right of a "chastisement by a husband to his wife and the chastisement of minor children" so long as the assault does not exceed the limits prescribed by Sharia. In Lebanon, as many as three-quarters of all Lebanese women have suffered physical abuse at the hands of husbands or male relatives at some point in their lives. In Afghanistan, over 85% of women report domestic violence; other nations with very high rates of domestic violence and limited legal rights include Syria, Pakistan, Egypt, Morocco, Iran, Yemen and Saudi Arabia. In some Islamic countries such as Turkey, where legal protections against domestic violence have been enacted, serial domestic violence by husband and other male members of her family is mostly ignored by witnesses and accepted by women without her getting legal help, according to a Government of Turkey report.

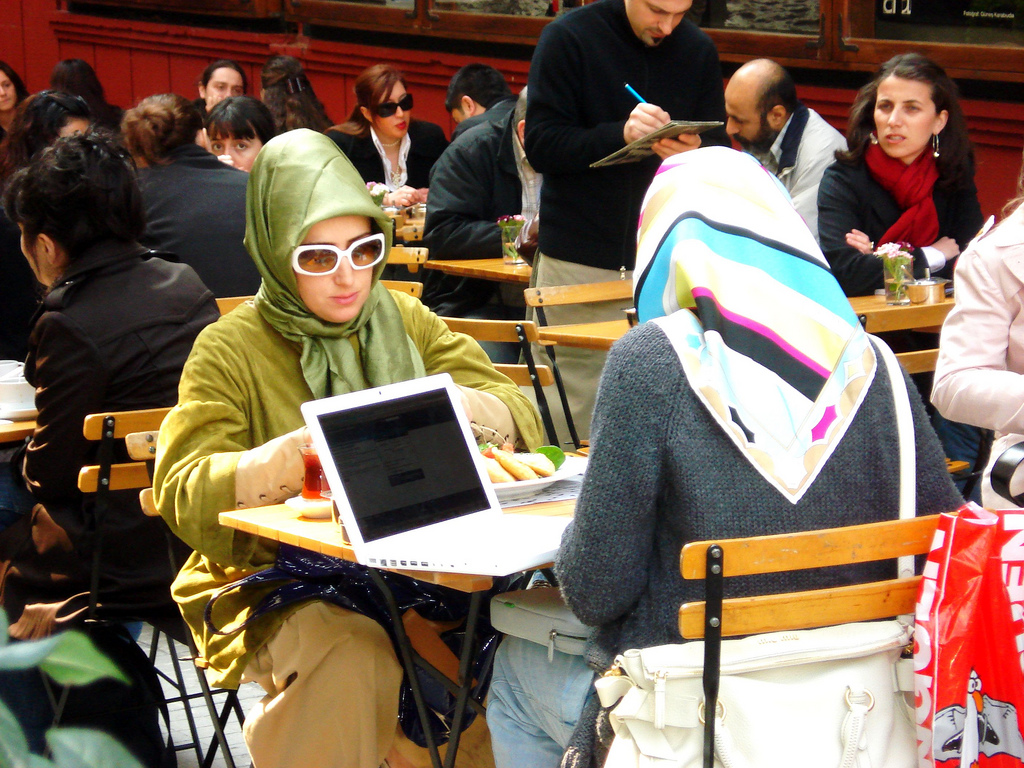
Women in an Istanbul cafeteria

Turkey was the first country in Europe to ratify (on March 14, 2012) the Council of Europe Convention on preventing and combating violence against women and domestic violence, which is known as the Istanbul Convention because it was first opened for signature in Turkey's largest city (on May 11, 2011). In 2021, Turkey became the first and only country to withdraw from the convention, after denouncing it on 20 March 2021. Three other European countries with a significant (≥c.20%) Muslim population—Albania, Bosnia and Herzegovina, and Montenegro—have also ratified the convention, while Macedonia is a signatory to the document. The aim of the convention is to create a Europe free from violence against women and domestic violence. On December 10, 2014, the Serbian-Turkish pop star Emina Jahović released a video clip entitled Ne plašim se ("I'm not scared") to help raise awareness of domestic violence in the Balkans. Ne plašim se highlighted the link between alcohol consumption and domestic abuse. The film's release date was timed to coincide with the United Nations' Human Rights Day.

In the United States, a recent 2017 study done by the Institute for Social Policy and Understanding found that, "Domestic violence occurs in the Muslim community as often as it does in Christian and non-affiliated communities, but Muslim victims are more likely to involve faith leaders". Data from the study demonstrates that among American Muslims 13% of those surveyed said they knew someone in their faith community who was a victim of domestic violence, a number similar to that of Catholics (15%), Protestants (17%), of non-affiliated (14%), and even the general public (15%). Among Americans Muslims who knew of a domestic violence incident in the past year, the percentage of them who said the crime was reported to law enforcement (50%) is comparable to other groups and the general public as well. American Muslim respondents reported that a faith leader was informed of the domestic violence about half the time, a significantly higher rate than any other faith group surveyed in the poll.

== Female education ==
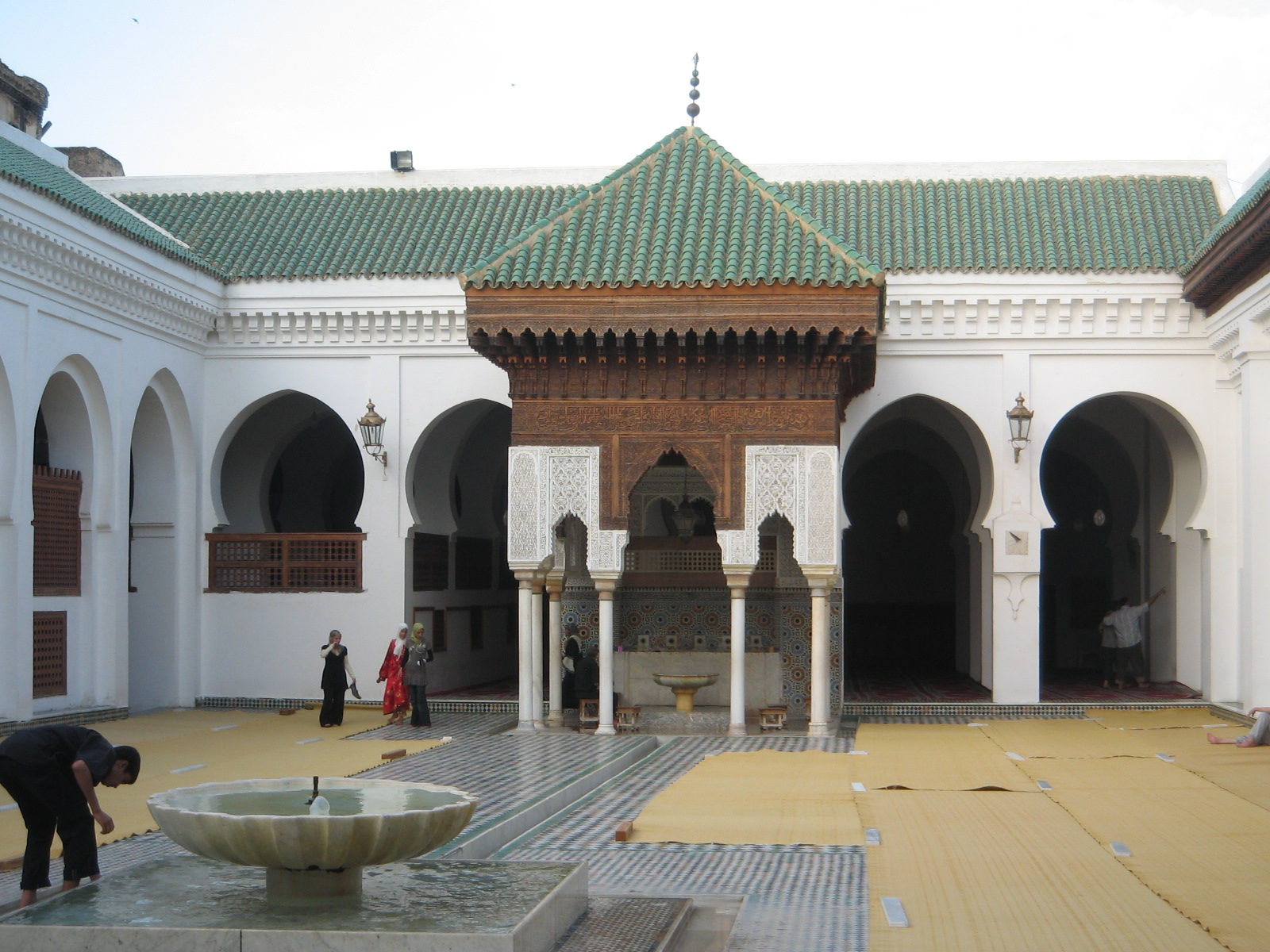
The University of al-Qarawiyyin (Université Al Quaraouiyine) in the Moroccan city of Fes was founded as a mosque complex by a Muslim woman – Fatima al-Fihri, the educated daughter of a wealthy merchant – in 859. According to UNESCO, it is the oldest university in the world which is still operational. It was incorporated into Morocco's modern state university system in 1963.

=== The classical position ===
The Quran, ḥadīth literature, and sunnah (the spoken or acted example attributed to Muhammad) advocate the rights of women and men equally to seek knowledge. The Quran commands all Muslims to exert effort in the pursuit of knowledge, irrespective of their biological sex: it constantly encourages Muslims to read, think, contemplate and learn from the signs of God in nature. Moreover, Muhammad encouraged education for both males and females: he declared that seeking knowledge was a religious duty binding upon every Muslim man and woman. Like her male counterpart, each woman is under a moral and religious obligation to seek knowledge, develop her intellect, broaden her outlook, cultivate her talents and then use her potential to the benefit of her soul and her society. Copyists made it evident that women were entitled to seek an education just as much as any man by stating in the ḥadīth literature that it is everyone's duty, whether male or female, to seek knowledge. Along with these ideals came with hesitation from some who believed an educated woman who could read and write was described as poisonous. Many women throughout the Muslim world took this opportunity to receive education.

Muhammad's teachings were widely sought by both sexes, and accordingly at the time of his death it was reported that there were many female scholars of Islam. Additionally, the wives of Muhammad—particularly Aisha—also taught both women and men; many of his companions and followers learned the Quran, ḥadīth, and Islamic jurisprudence (fiqh) from Aisha. Because Islam recognizes that women are in principle wives and mothers, the acquisition of knowledge in fields which are complementary to these social roles was specially emphasized.

There exist also some women who didn't conform to Pre-Islamic Arab traditions, such as:

- Nusaybah bint Ka'ab, a warrior who was known as The Shield of The Prophet. She fought in numerous battles like Uhud, Hunain, and Yamamah.
- Aisha, a wife of Muhammad, and a scholar.
- Khadija bint Khuwaylid, the first wife of Muhammad who was a successful (and wealthy until after getting married when she donated most of her wealth to charity) business-woman.
- Rufaida Al-Aslamia, an Arab medical and social worker recognized as the first female Muslim nurse and the first female surgeon in Islam. She is the first known nurse in history.

=== History of women's education ===
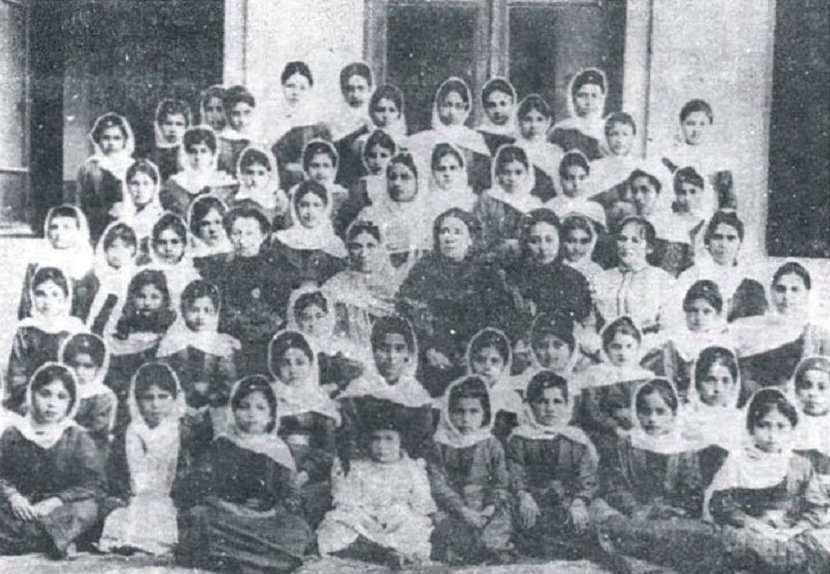
Director of the first muslim school for girls Ganifa Melikova with schoolgirls. Baku

James E. Lindsay states that Islam encouraged religious education of Muslim women. According to a ḥadīth in Saḥih Muslim variously attributed to Aisha and Muhammad, the women of the ansar were praiseworthy because shame did not prevent them from asking detailed questions about Islamic law.

While it was not common for women to enroll as students in formal religious schools, it was common for women to attend informal lectures and study sessions at mosques, madrassa and other public places. For example, the attendance of women at the Fatimid Caliphate's "sessions of wisdom" (majālis al-ḥikma) was noted by various historians, including Ibn al-Tuwayr, al-Muṣabbiḥī, and Imam. Historically, some Muslim women played an important role in the foundation of many religious educational institutions, such as Fatima al-Fihri's founding of the al-Karaouine mosque in 859 CE, from which later developed the University of al-Karaouine. Many royal women were founders of educational institutions, including madrassa. In Mamluk Cairo, women were responsible for endowing five madrassa and could even have the responsibility of being a supervisor of a madrasa administration if they had familial ties to a founder. According to the 12th-century Sunni scholar Ibn 'Asakir, there were various opportunities for female education during the Islamic Golden Age. He writes that women could study, earn ijazah (religious degrees) and qualify as ulama and Islamic teachers. Similarly, al-Sakhawi devotes one of the twelve volumes of his biographical dictionary Daw al-Lami to female religious scholars between 700 and 1800 CE, giving information on 1,075 of them. Women of prominent urban families were commonly educated in private settings and many of them received and later issued ijazah in ḥadīth studies, calligraphy, and recitation of poetry. There was a period of time where women scholars were vital to the transmission of the ḥadīth. Important female scholars such as Shuhda, Zaynab, Aisha, and Fatimah were trained at a very young age and influenced heavily by family members who were also scholars or immersed in the knowledge. Each had an extensive following and made many contributions to teaching those of various backgrounds. Working women learned religious texts and practical skills primarily from each other, though they also received some instruction together with men in mosques and private homes.

During the colonial era, until the early 20th century, there was a gender struggle among Muslims living under the British Empire; educating women was viewed as a prelude to social chaos, a threat to the moral order, and man's world was viewed as a source of Muslim identity. Muslim women in British India, nevertheless, pressed for their rights independently of men; by the 1930s, 2.5 million girls had entered schools, of which 0.5 million were Muslims.

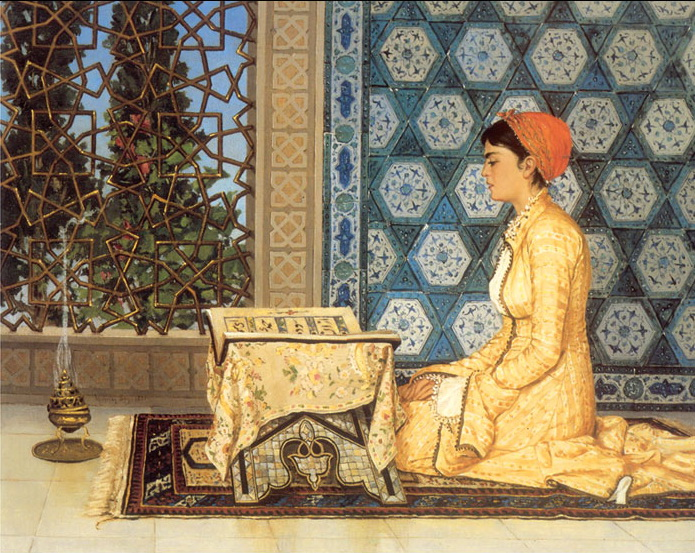
Girl Reciting the Qurān (Kuran Okuyan Kız), an 1880 painting by the Ottoman polymath Osman Hamdi Bey, whose works often showed women engaged in educational activities

=== Women as educators ===
The mid-14th century saw a rise in women's participation, such as the teaching of ḥadīth. This increase was due to the greater contribution to the education of women and greater encouragement in women's religious participation. Contact with scholars as well as the mosque allowed women to learn and obtain the credentials to teach the ḥadīth. This newfound movement allowed for greater mobilization on the role of women in the passage of knowledge. The expansion of women's religious involvement helped challenge the role of women in the domestic sector and paved the way for a greater expansion of knowledge. Ḥadīth transmission also allowed women to gain status by putting them in a pedigree that connected them to the time of Muhammad. Women who participated in the transmission of the ḥadīth were known as muhaddithat.

=== Traveling for knowledge ===
One way that Islamic scholars obtained knowledge was through traveling. Traveling for knowledge is highly encouraged not only among men but also among female scholars. Women could travel with their mahram or relatives to other towns to learn and acquire education in the study of ḥadīth literature. Furthermore, women scholars also took journeys to different cities to teach the ḥadīth as well as other genera of knowledge, such as literature and law. Students would undertake long journeys just to hear their teachings. Traveling for knowledge allows women scholars the ability to take part in religious teachings outside of their homes. Through traveling and other venues, women hadiths were able to contribute a tremendous amount to the transmission of knowledge in the Islamic world.

=== Famous muhaddithat ===
==== Zaynab bint al-Kamal ====
Zaynab bint al-Kamal (1248–1339 CE) was a famous ḥadīth scholar. She is known to have obtained numerous ijazah (permission to teach the ḥadīth) throughout her life, especially in her early years. At the age of one, she received her first ijazah from Abd al-Khaliq al-Nishtibri. Her father was not a famous hadith transmitter, and there was no account of his role in her studies. However, it was noted that her uncle, Shams al-Din Muhammad, excelled in the field of transmission and was most likely the one that facilitated her studies. Her reputation came from her association with al-Nishtibri, with students traveling far to hear her teachings. She was known as a reliable authority that encompassed different genera of studies. She held mixed classes in al-Madrasa al-Diya'iyyah, a congregational mosque, and her home. Students would come from afar to listen to her teachings. She is also known to travel to Egypt and Medina to teach her works. In her later years, she continued to thrive as a teacher. She also repeated her cycle by giving out ijazah to her students during their early years. In a field where male ḥadīth teachers predominate, her reputation helped pave the way for more female transmitters of the ḥadīth. Furthermore, she acts as the last connection to the work of famous scholars that might have passed during her time.

=== Current situation ===
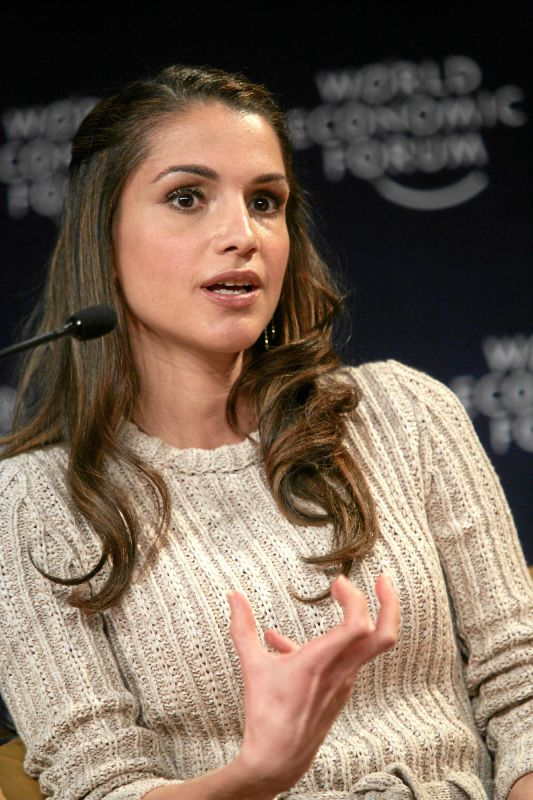
Queen Rania Al Abdullah of Jordan is one of the Islamic world's most high-profile educational campaigners. Her foundation—established in 2013—is developing a number of education programmes, including online learning platform Edraak.org.

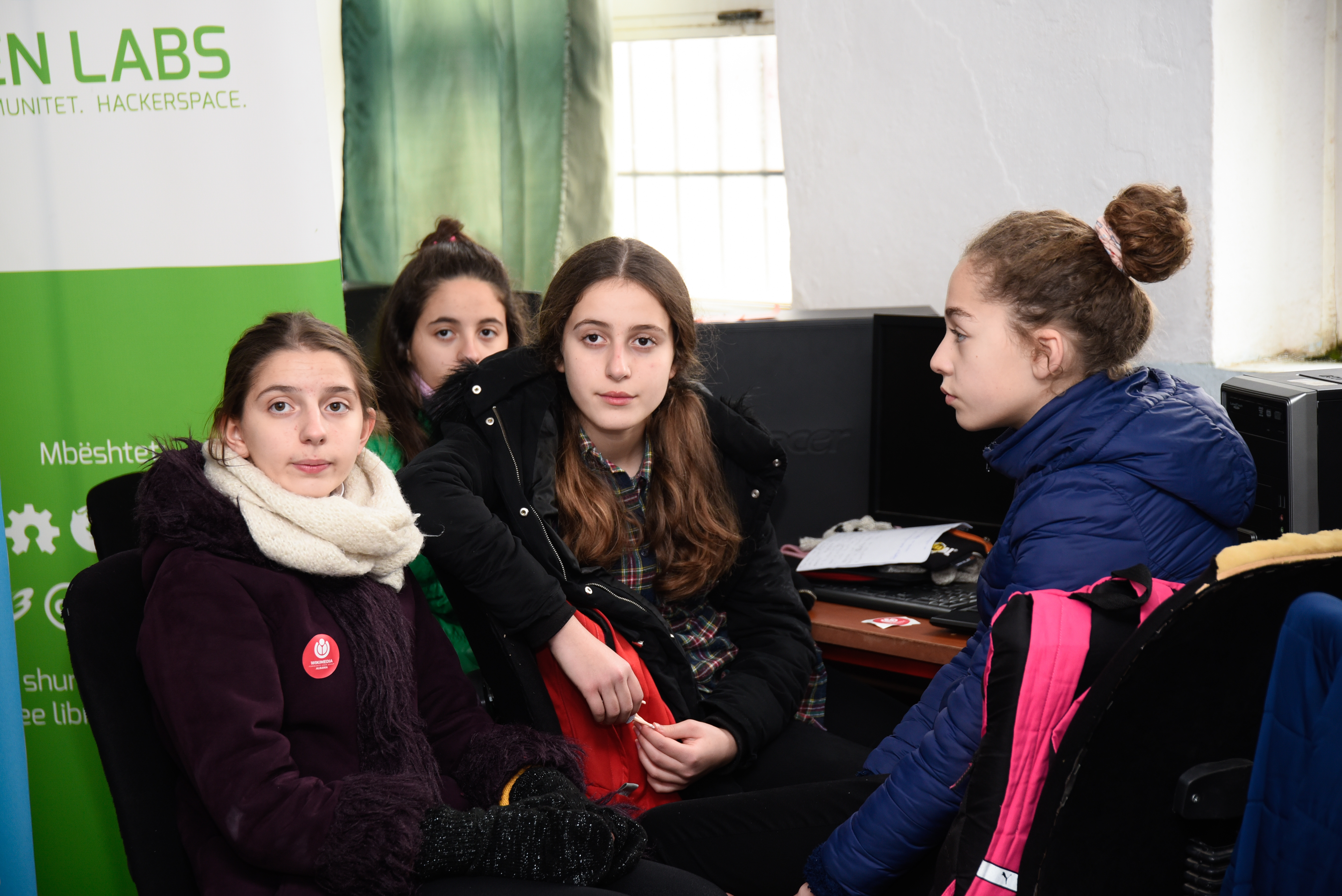
Elementary schoolgirls from OIC member state Albania pictured during Code Week 2017 in Burrel, near Tirana. Between 2009 and 2015, Albania saw consistent and substantial improvements in all three PISA subjects.

Literacy

In a 2013 statement, the Organization of Islamic Cooperation noted that restricted access to education is among the challenges faced by girls and women in the developing world, including OIC member states. UNICEF notes that out of 24 nations with less than 60% female primary enrollment rates, 17 were Islamic nations; more than half the adult population is illiterate in several Islamic countries, and the proportion reaches 70% among Muslim women. UNESCO estimates that the literacy rate among adult women was about 50% or less in a number of Muslim-majority countries, including Morocco, Yemen, Bangladesh, Pakistan, Niger, Mali, Gambia, Guinea, Guinea-Bissau, and Chad. Egypt had a female literacy rate of 64% in 2010, Iraq of 71% and Indonesia of 90%. Literacy has been improving in Saudi Arabia since the 1970s, the female literacy rate in 2017 for women ages 15–24 was 99.3%, equivalent to the male literacy rate of 99.3%. Western ideals have had an influence over education in Muslim countries due to the increased demand of literacy in males and females. It is evident that more women are making an effort to receive an education by attending primary and secondary school in Muslim countries.

Gender and participation in education

Some scholars contend that Islamic nations have the world's highest gender gap in education. The 2012 World Economic Forum annual gender gap study finds the 17 out of 18 worst performing nations, out of a total of 135 nations, are the following members of Organization of Islamic Cooperation (OIC): Algeria, Jordan, Lebanon, (Nepal), Turkey, Oman, Egypt, Iran, Mali, Morocco, Côte d'Ivoire, Saudi Arabia, Syria, Chad, Pakistan, and Yemen.

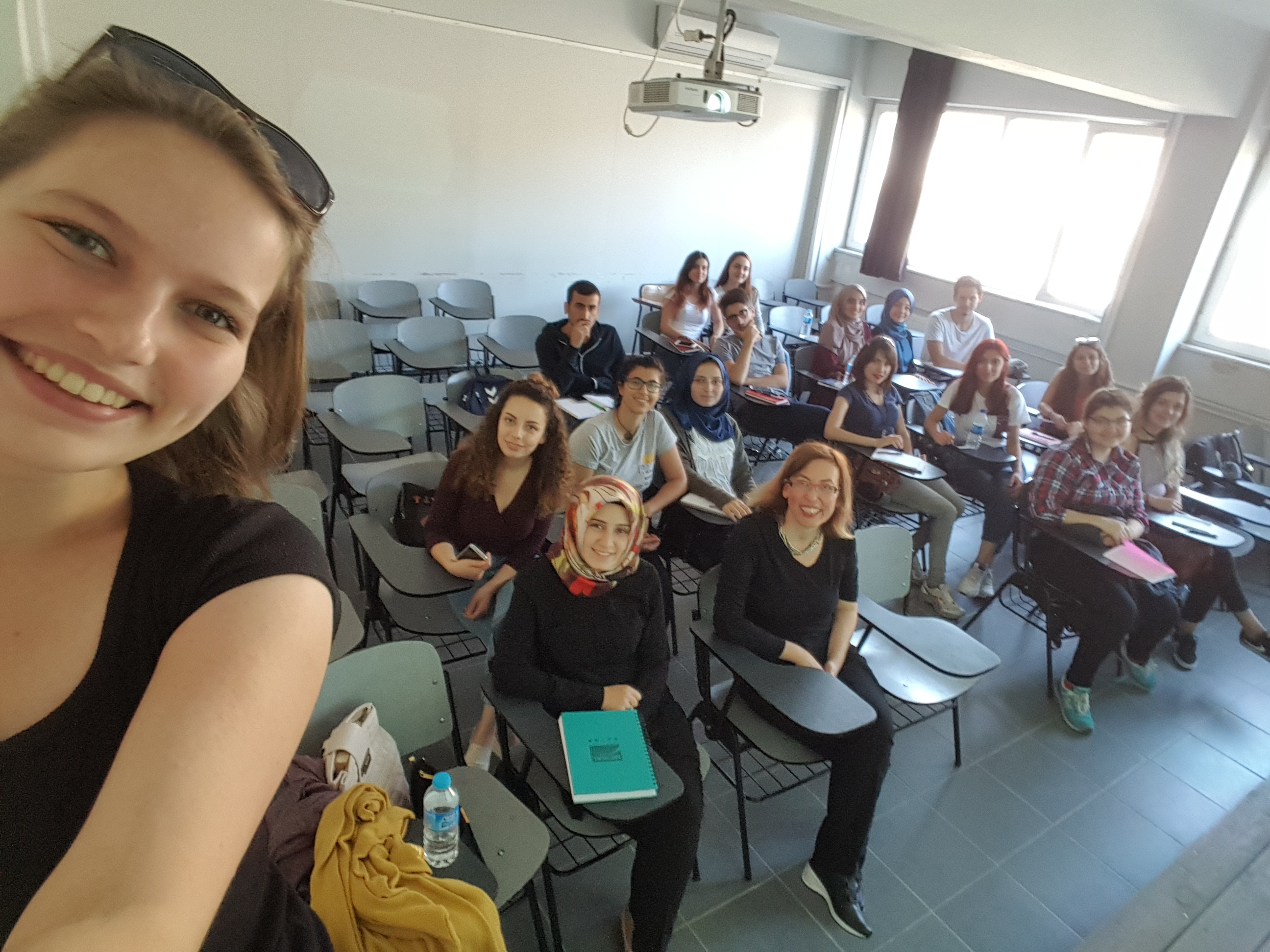
A scene from a female-majority class at the Psychology Department of Uludağ University in Bursa, Turkey. In Turkey, 47.5% of staff at the top five universities are female, a higher proportion than for their equivalents in the United States (35.9%), Denmark (31%) and Japan (12.7%).

In contrast, UNESCO notes that at 37% the share of female researchers in Muslim-majority states compares well with other regions. In Turkey, the proportion of female university researchers is slightly higher (36%) than the average for the 27-member European Union as of 2012 (33%). Comparably, at 36.5%, the overall share of women researchers at universities and science centres in North Africa is above world (22.5%), European (33%) and developed country (26%) averages. In Iran, women account for over 60% of university students. Similarly, in Malaysia, Algeria, and in Saudi Arabia, the majority of university students have been female in recent years, while in 2016 Emirati women constituted 76.8% of people enrolled at universities in the United Arab Emirates. At the University of Jordan, which is Jordan's largest and oldest university, 65% of students were female in 2013.

In a number of OIC member states, the ratio of women to men in tertiary education is exceptionally high. Qatar leads the world in this respect, having 6.66 females in higher education for every male as of 2015. Other Muslim-majority states with notably more women university students than men include Kuwait, where 41% of females attend university compared with 18% of males; Bahrain, where the ratio of women to men in tertiary education is 2.18:1; Brunei Darussalam, where 33% of women enroll at university vis à vis 18% of men; Tunisia, which has a women to men ratio of 1.62 in higher education; and Kyrgyzstan, where the equivalent ratio is 1.61. Additionally, in Kazakhstan, there were 115 female students for every 100 male students in tertiary education in 1999; according to the World Bank, this ratio had increased to 144:100 by 2008.

A notable development specific to the study of physics is that women in Muslim-majority countries enjoy significantly greater representation than their counterparts in the United States: in the US, women make up 21% of physics undergraduates and 20% of PhD students, while the equivalent figures for Muslim-majority nations are 60%+ and 47% respectively. Female physicists who studied in Muslim-majority states and then moved to the US for academic positions noted that when they were in their previous locations, "they did not feel they had to suppress their femininity to have their intellect—and not their appearance—be the focus of the interaction."

Similarly, the very high (c.50%) female engineering enrolment rates in three diverse OIC member states—Tunisia, Jordan, and Malaysia—have prompted the incorporation of Women in Engineering in Predominately Muslim Countries ('WIEPMCS') at three American universities (Washington State, Purdue and Western Washington). The aim of this project is to 'shed light more generally on how context shapes women's successful participation in STEM in ways that inform our efforts to broaden participation in the US', where female enrolment rates in engineering are typically 15–20%.

In the United States, a recent study done by the Institute for Social Policy and Understanding found that Muslim American women (73%) are more likely than Muslim American men (57%) to achieve higher education (post-high school education or higher).

== Economy and independent social integration ==
=== Female employment ===
Some scholars refer to verse 28:23 in the Quran regarding Moses and two working women, and to Khadijah, Muhammad's first wife, a merchant before and after converting to Islam, as indications that Muslim women may undertake employment outside their homes. Surah Al-Qasas 28:23

When he arrived at the well of Midian, he found a group of people watering ˹their herds˺. Apart from them, he noticed two women holding back ˹their herd˺. He asked ˹them˺, "What is the problem?" They replied, "We cannot water ˹our animals˺ until the ˹other˺ shepherds are done, for our father is a very old man."

Traditional interpretations of Islam require a woman to have her husband's permission to leave the house and take up employment, though scholars such as Grand Mufti Ali Gomaa and Grand Ayatollah Mohammad Ebrahim Jannaati have said that women do not require a husband's permission to leave the house and work.

==== History ====
During medieval times, the labor force in Spanish Caliphate included women in diverse occupations and economic activities such as farming, construction workers, textile workers, managing slave girls, collecting taxes from prostitutes, as well as presidents of guilds, creditors and religious scholars.

In the 12th century, Ibn Rushd claimed that women were equal to men in all respects and possessed equal capacities to shine, citing examples of female warriors among the Arabs, Greeks and Africans to support his case. In the early history of Islam, examples of notable female Muslims who fought during the Muslim conquests and Fitna (civil wars) as soldiers or generals included Nusaybah bint Ka'ab a.k.a. Umm Amarah, Aisha, Kahula and Wafeira.

Medieval Bimarestan or hospitals included female staff as female nurses. Muslim hospitals were also the first to employ female physicians, such as Banu Zuhr family who served the Almohad caliph ruler Abu Yusuf Yaqub al-Mansur in the 12th century. This was necessary due to the segregation of male and female patients in Islamic hospitals. Later in the 15th century, female surgeons were employed at Şerafeddin Sabuncuoğlu's Cerrahiyyetu'l-Haniyye (Imperial Surgery).

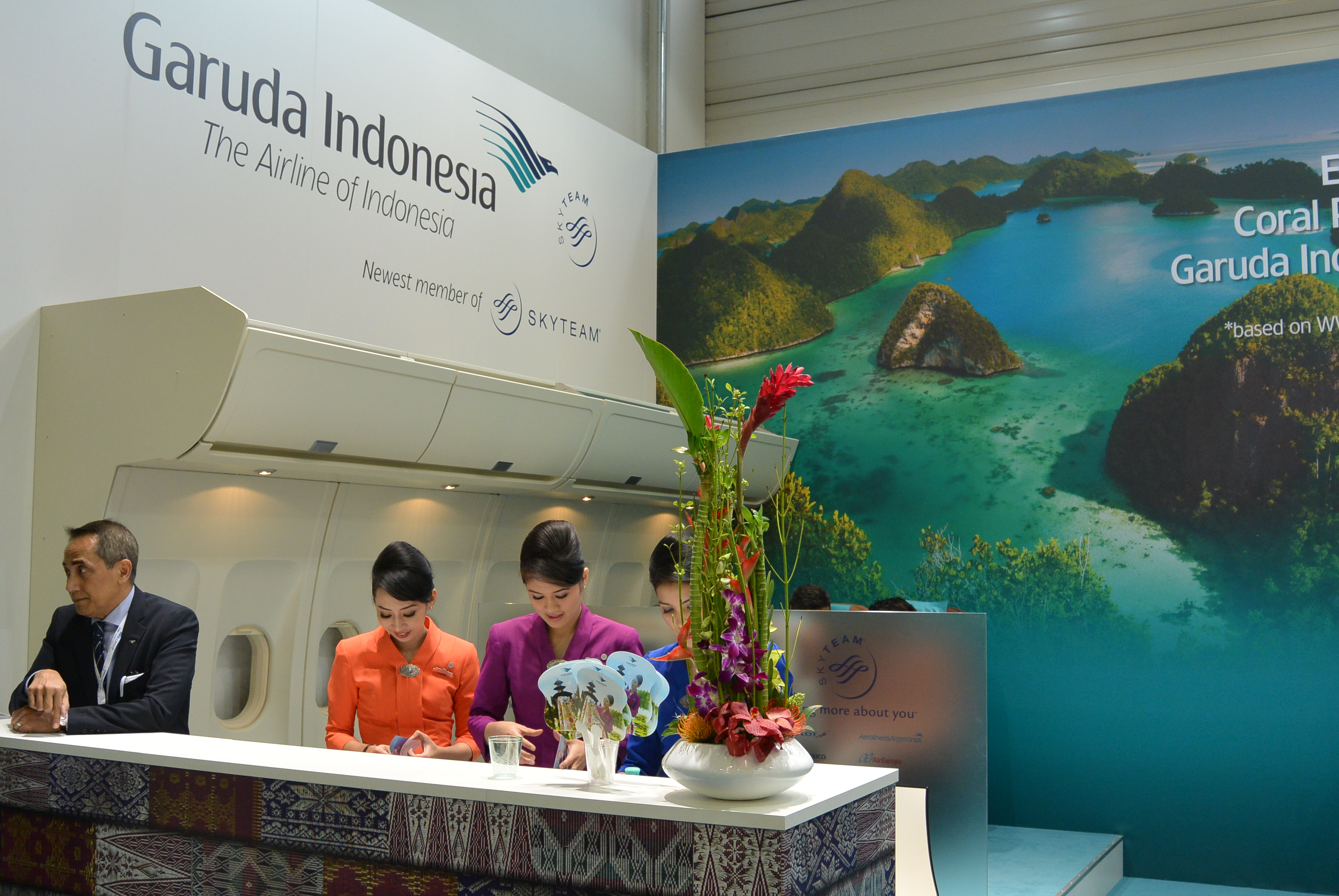
Three female Garuda Indonesia employees (centre) pictured at the ITB Berlin tourism trade fair. The proportion of senior business roles held by women in Indonesia is 46%, the highest in ASEAN and well above the level of countries such as Brazil (19%), Germany (18%), India (17%) and Japan (7%).

==== Modern era ====
Patterns of women's employment vary throughout the Muslim world: as of 2005, 16% of Pakistani women were "economically active" (either employed, or unemployed but available to furnish labor), whereas 52% of Indonesian women were. According to a 2012 World Economic Forum report and other recent reports, Islamic nations in the Middle East and North Africa region are increasing their creation of economic and employment opportunities for women; compared, however, to every other region in the world, the Middle East and North African region ranks lowest on economic participation, employment opportunity and the political empowerment of women. Ten countries with the lowest women labour force participation in the world—Jordan, Oman, Morocco, Iran, Turkey, Algeria, Yemen, Saudi Arabia, Pakistan and Syria—are Islamic countries, as are the four countries that have no female parliamentarians.

Women are allowed to work in Islam, subject to certain conditions. For example, an acceptable circumstance is if a woman is in financial need and her employment does not cause her to neglect her important role as a mother and wife. It has been claimed that it is the responsibility of the Muslim community to organize work for women, so that she can do so in a Muslim cultural atmosphere, where her rights (as set out in the Quran) are respected. Islamic law however, permits women to work in Islamic conditions, such as the work not requiring the woman to violate Islamic law (e.g., serving alcohol), and that she maintain her modesty while she performs any work outside her home.

In some cases, when women have the right to work and are educated, women's job opportunities may in practice be unequal to those of men. In Egypt for example, women have limited opportunities to work in the private sector because women are still expected to put their role in the family first, which causes men to be seen as more reliable in the long term. In Saudi Arabia, it was illegal for Saudi women to drive until June 2018. It is becoming more common for Saudi Arabian women to procure driving licenses from other Gulf Cooperation Council states such as the United Arab Emirates and Bahrain.

According to the International Business Report (2014) published by global accounting network Grant Thornton, Indonesia—which is the world's largest Muslim country by population—has ≥40% of senior business management positions occupied by women, a greater proportion than the United States (22%) and Denmark (14%). Prominent female business executives in the Islamic world include Güler Sabancı, the CEO of the industrial and financial conglomerate Sabancı Holding; Ümit Boyner, a non-executive director at Boyner Holding who was the chairwoman of TÜSİAD, the Turkish Industrialists and Businessmen Association, from 2010 to 2013; Bernadette Ruth Irawati Setiady, the CEO of PT Kalbe Farma Tbk., the largest pharmaceutical company in the ASEAN trade bloc; Atiek Nur Wahyuni, the director of Trans TV, a major free-to-air television station in Indonesia; and Elissa Freiha, a founding partner of the UAE-based investment platform WOMENA.

==== The classical position ====
According to verse 4:32 of the Quran, both men and women have an independent economic position: 'For men is a portion of what they earn, and for women is a portion of what they earn. Ask God for His grace. God has knowledge of all things.' Women therefore are at liberty to buy, sell, mortgage, lease, borrow or lend, and sign contracts and legal documents. Additionally, women can donate money, act as trustees and set up a business or company. These rights cannot be altered, irrespective of marital status. When a woman is married, she legally has total control over the dower—the mahr or bridal gift, usually financial in nature, which the groom pays to the bride upon marriage—and retains this control in the event of divorce.

Quranic principles, especially the teaching of zakāh or purification of wealth, encourage women to own, invest, save and distribute their earnings and savings according to their discretion. These also acknowledge and enforce the right of women to participate in various economic activities.

In contrast to many other cultures, a woman in Islam has always been entitled as per Sharia law to keep her family name and not take her husband's name. Therefore, a Muslim woman has traditionally always been known by the name of her family as an indication of her individuality and her own legal identity: there is no historically practiced process of changing the names of women be they married, divorced or widowed. With the spread of western-style state bureaucracies across the Islamic world from the nineteenth century onwards, this latter convention has come under increasing pressure, and it is now commonplace for Muslim women to change their names upon marriage.

=== Economic equity ===
The Islamic teaching of going out of one's way to treat women equitably in financial dealings is exemplified by a story featuring Abū Ḥanīfa al-Nuʿmān ibn Thābit ibn Zūṭā (700–767)—the founder of the Ḥanafī School of Law, who in his earlier life was a textile merchant in a garrison town—and a woman who came to his store offering to sell Abū Ḥanīfa a silk garment. The author and investment banker Harris Irfan narrates the story as follows:

"The lady offered to sell the garment to Abu Hanifa for 100 dirhams but Abu Hanifa would not buy it. 'It is worth more than a hundred', he told the surprised woman. 'How much?' he asked her again. She offered to sell it for 200 dirhams and he turned her down. Then she asked for 300, then 400, at which point the exasperated woman scolded him. 'You are mocking me', she declared, and prepared to walk away from the deal to try her luck elsewhere. So they summoned another merchant and he solemnly valued the garment at 500 dirhams. Rather than profit from the woman's ignorance, Abu Hanifa had opted to settle for a fair trade, a principle he would abide by all his life—that the greedy should be regulated from taking advantage of the vulnerable."

=== Politics ===
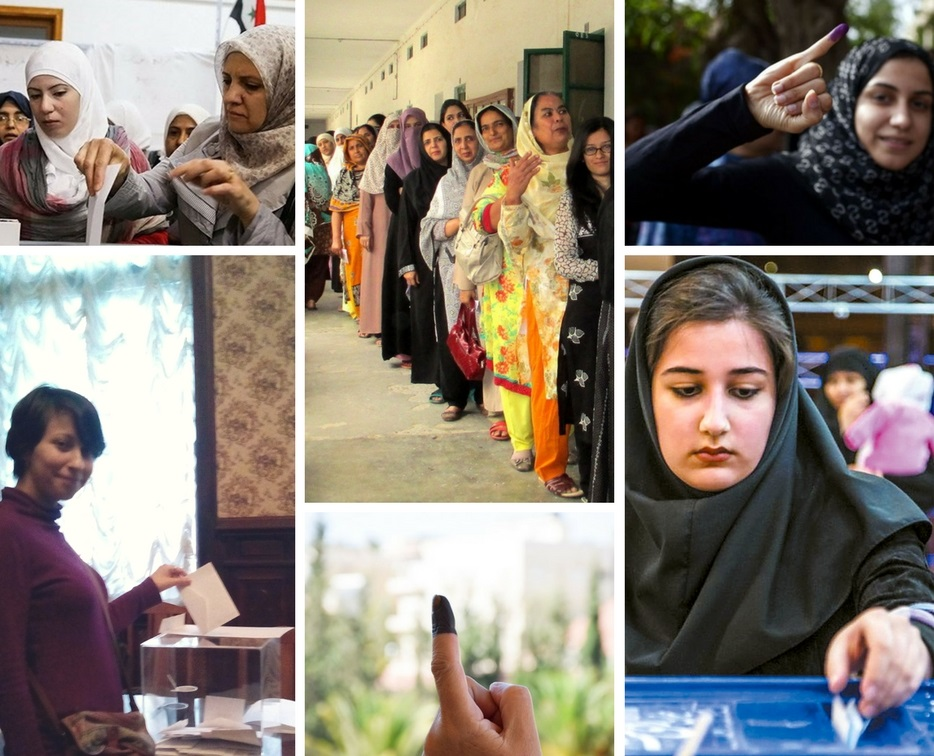
A collage of Muslim women voters in the 2010s from different countries

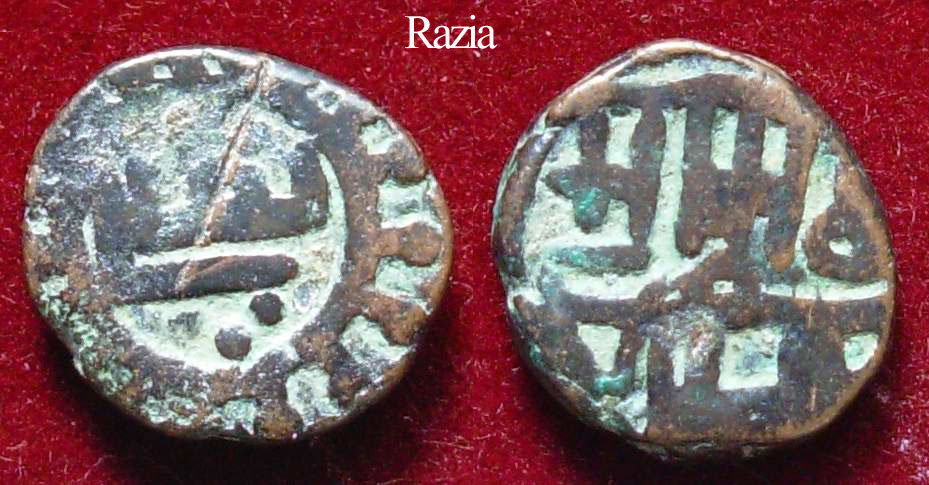
The coins issued during the rule of Razia Sultana. She inherited and ruled the Sultanate of Delhi for 3 years in the early 13th century.

While according to Sahih Al-Bukhari, Muhammad was of the view that any nation led by women was doomed to failure, many classical Islamic scholars, such as al-Tabari, supported female leadership. In early Islamic history, women including Aisha, Umm Waraqa, and Samra Binte Wahaib took part in political activities. Ash-Shifa would later on become the head of Health and Safety in Basra, Iraq. Other historical Muslim female leaders include Shajarat ad-Durr, who ruled Egypt from 1250 to 1257, Razia Sultana, who ruled the Sultanate of Delhi from 1236 to 1239, and Taj ul-Alam, who ruled Aceh Sultanate from 1641 to 1675.

This historical record contrasts markedly with that of (predominantly Taoist and Buddhist) Chinese-majority nations, where there were no women rulers in the period between the reign of the fierce empress Wu Zetian at the turn of the eighth century (690–705), and the inauguration of Tsai Ing-wen as President of the Republic of China in 2016.

Dar al-Ifta al-Misriyyah, an Islamic institute that advises Egypt's ministry of justice, had said women can both be rulers and judges in an Islamic state.

==== Female heads of state in Muslim-majority countries during the modern era ====
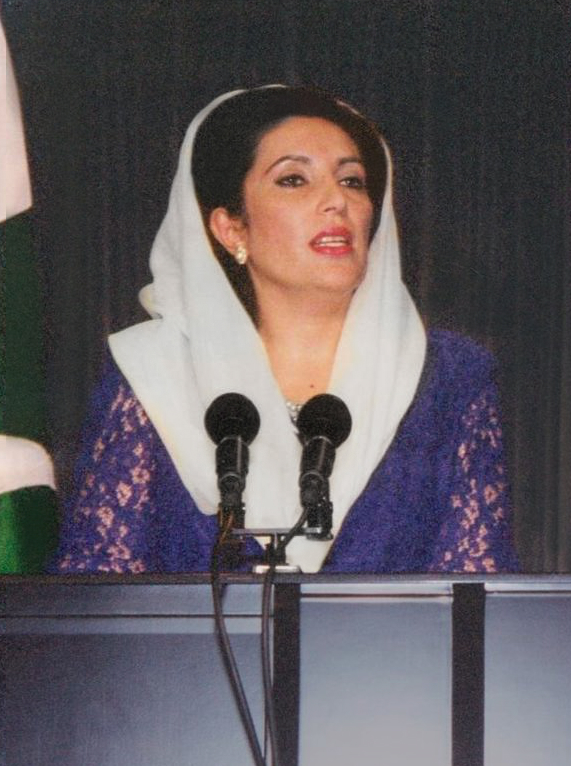
Benazir Bhutto was the first elected female head of state in a Muslim-majority country, serving as the Prime Minister of Pakistan twice (1988–1990, 1993–1996).

In the modern era, Pakistan became the first Muslim-majority state with an elected female head of government (1988). Currently Bangladesh is the country that has had females as head of government continuously the longest starting with Khaleda Zia in 1991.

In the past several decades, a number of countries in which Muslims are a majority, including Turkey (Prime Minister Tansu Çiller, 1993), Pakistan's Benazir Bhutto (1988–1996), Bangladesh (prime ministers Begum Khaleda Zia, 1991–1996, 2001–2009) and Sheikh Hasina (1996–2001, 2009–2024), Indonesia (President Megawati Sukarnoputri, 2001), Kosovo (President Atifete Jahjaga, 2011), and Kyrgyzstan (President Roza Otunbayeva, 2010) have been led by women; Mauritius, which has a significant Muslim minority, elected a female Muslim (Ameenah Gurib) as president in 2015.

At one stage in the 1990s, over 300 million Muslims—at that time, between one-third and a quarter of the world's entire Islamic population—were simultaneously ruled by women when elected heads of state Tansu Çiller (the 22nd Prime Minister of Turkey), Khaleda Zia (the 9th Prime Minister of Bangladesh) and Benazir Bhutto (the 11th Prime Minister of Pakistan) led their respective countries.

==== Female legislators in Muslim-majority countries in the 21st century ====
As well as elected heads of state, a number of other elected female politicians have attained exceptional levels of notability within the OIC in the twenty-first century. These include Louisa Hanoune, the head of Algeria's Workers' Party and the first woman to be a presidential candidate in an Arab country (2004; Hanoune also ran for the same post in 2009 and 2014); Susi Pudjiastuti, Indonesia's Minister of Maritime Affairs and Fisheries (2014–2019) who is also a successful seafood and transportation entrepreneur who has been profiled in the Financial Times; Meral Akşener, a veteran Turkish conservative nationalist politician who is the founder and leader of the İyi Party (2017–); and mezzo-soprano opera singer Dariga Nazarbayeva, the Chairwoman of the Kazakhstan Senate and one of her country's wealthiest individuals.

Several Muslim-majority nations have passed laws to incorporate more women in their parliaments and political processes. For example, Indonesia passed a law in 2013 that required political parties to field at least 30% women candidates in elections or pay a financial penalty, a law which was later amended to stipulate that at least one in three candidates on every party's electoral list must be female and parties which do not fulfill this criterion will be barred from contesting the election; Tunisia's mandated electoral lists composed of 50% women in both the 2011 and 2014 legislative elections; and in 2012, Algeria set a minimum parliamentary female membership requirement of 30%. Following the May 2012 legislative elections, women constitute 31.6% of Algerian MPs. In Senegal, 50% of local and national electoral lists have to be female as of 2012. Following the passage of Law No. 46 of 2014, Egypt has required party lists to include a certain number of women; in 2018, Egypt's cabinet had eight female ministers out of a total of 35 (22.9%). Kosovo has had a female quota for its assembly as far back as 2001, when it was de jure part of the Federal Republic of Yugoslavia; the Muslim-majority (95.6%) Balkan republic guarantees women 30% of parliamentary seats as of 2016.

Since 2012 Saudi women have been allowed to vote in some elections. The Shura Council of Saudi Arabia now includes female members after a January 2013 decree by the Saudi King that created reserved parliamentary seats for women, while four women were appointed to Qatar's 41-member Shura Council in 2017. Kuwait granted its women the right to vote in the first half of the 1980s; this right was later rescinded, and then reintroduced in 2005. Additionally, the United Arab Emirates has allocated 30% of its top government posts to women; as of February 2016, females accounted for 27.5% of the UAE's cabinet.

According to Sheikh Zoubir Bouchikhi, Imam of the Islamic Society of Greater Houston's Southeast Mosque, nothing in Islam specifically allows or disallows voting by women. Until recently most Muslim nations were non-democratic, but most today allow their citizens to have some level of voting and control over their government. However, some Muslim countries gave women suffrage in the early 20th century. For example, Azerbaijan extended voting rights to women in 1918, two years before it became part of Soviet Union. Females in Turkey similarly gained the right to vote in municipal and parliamentary elections in 1930 and 1934 respectively.

=== Muslim women and Islamophobia in non-Muslim majority countries ===
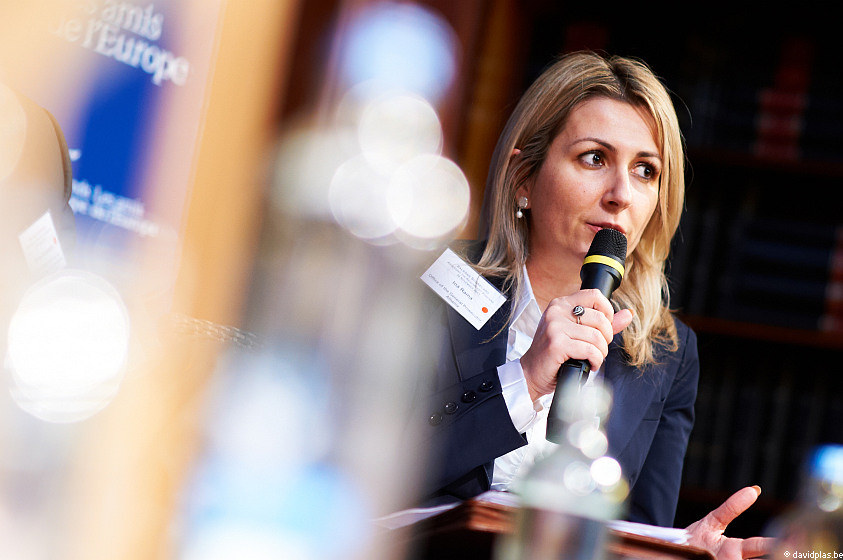
Judge Ina Rama, who as Prosecutor General (2007–2012) of OIC member state Albania was the highest judicial authority in the country's criminal legal system

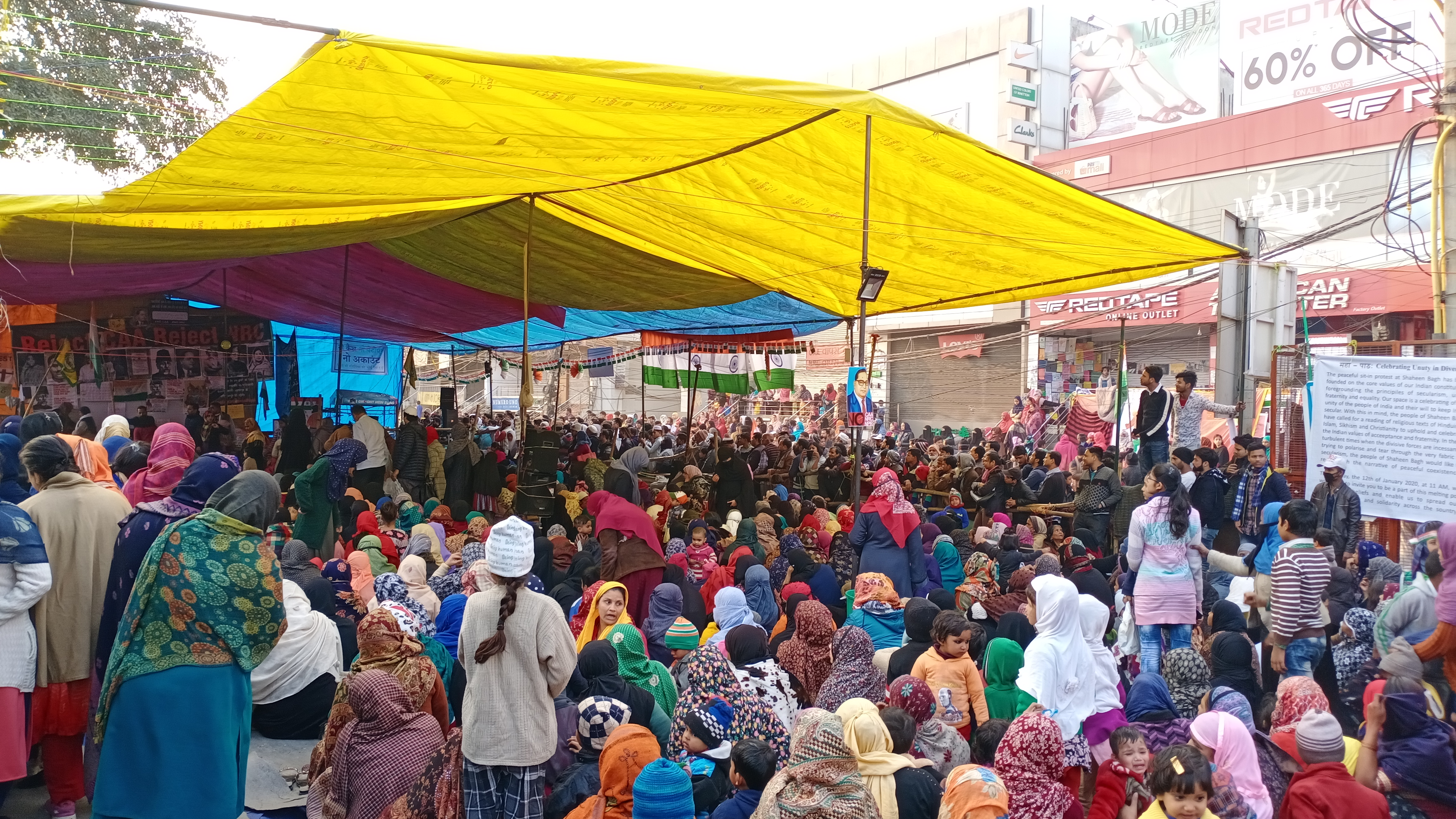
The Shaheen Bagh protest in Delhi, against a controversial citizenship law widely perceived to be anti-Muslim, was a sit-in staged primarily by Muslim women.

In the United States, Islamophobia, coupled with the 2016 presidential election which heightened anti-Muslim sentiment has particularly impacted on Muslim American women. In their 2018 American Muslim Poll, think tank Institute for Social Policy and Understanding (ISPU) reported, "though roughly half of women of all backgrounds, including Muslim women, report experiencing some frequency of gender-based discrimination in the past year, Muslim women's more frequent complaints are racial (75%) and religious (69%) discrimination." Most Muslim women (72%) and Muslim men (76%) reject the notion that "most Muslims in America discriminate against women."

Further data collected by the ISPU has found that "Muslim women are more likely than Muslim men to report experiencing religious discrimination in the last year (68% vs. 55%)". After the bombing of the World Trade Center, Muslim women were especially exposed to increased violence in public spaces. Research showed that 85% of Muslim women experienced violence through verbal threats as well as 25% of Muslim women experiencing actual physical violence in public spaces. ISPU also found that most American Muslim women (68%) agree that most people associate negative stereotypes with their faith identity. Among these, more than half (52%) "strongly agree" that being Muslim is correlated with negative stereotypes. Data shows that American Muslim women are actually more likely than Muslim men to fear for their safety from white supremacist groups (47% vs. 31%) and nearly one in five (19%) Muslim women say they have stress and anxiety enough to believe they need the help of a mental health professional as a result of the 2016 presidential elections, compared with only 9% of American Muslim men. Despite this deficit in security and greater likelihood for experienced religious-based discrimination, Muslim women are no more likely than Muslim men to change their appearance to be less identifiable as a Muslim (16% vs. 15%). Additionally, despite many feeling stigmatized, a large majority of Muslim American women (87%) say they are proud to be identified as a member of their faith community.

According to the European Network Against Racism NGO, In addition to enhanced prevalence of Islamophobia among Muslim American women, Muslim European women also experienced heightened Islamophobia—especially, when they wear headscarves. Islamophobia researcher and convert to Islam Linda Hyokki points out that at an even higher risk of Islamophobia are Muslim women of color, as they are always susceptible to Islamophobia, with or without their headscarves. In 2017, English Islamophobic monitoring company Tell Mama reported that there had been a 26% increase in Islamophobia in the UK, overwhelmingly affecting Muslim women more than Muslim men. Additionally, Muslim women disproportionately face the Islamophobic trope that women are seen as "inferior" in their religion. Research has found that media along with politics, particularly, in European society, perpetuate these stereotypes of Muslim women. Aside from seeing women as experiencing sexism within their religion, other Islamophobic stereotypes of Muslim women include seeing them as, "either [...] oppressed or as dangerous".

=== Sport ===
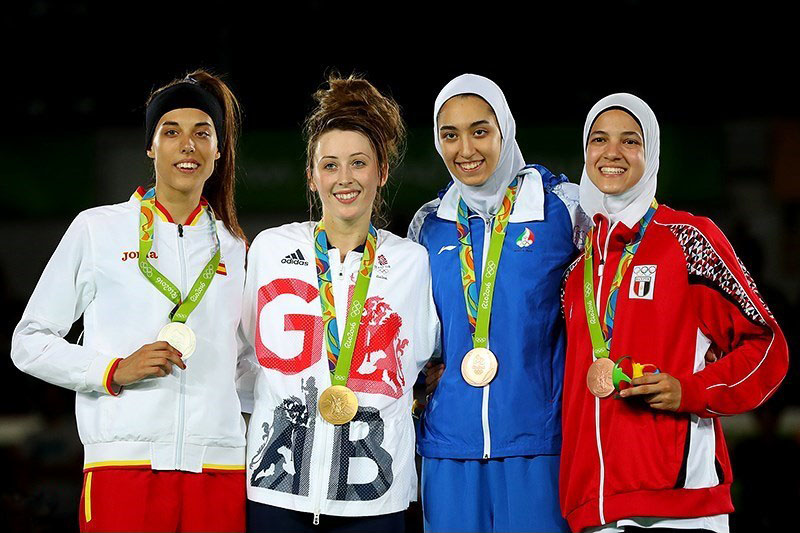
Taekwondo medallists from Spain, Britain, Egypt and Iran at the 2016 Summer Olympics, including two hijabi women

In the Islamic conception, every human being has a responsibility towards oneself. Since human life is sacred and initially created by divine rather than human agency, people are responsible for trying to keep their bodies and souls healthy, and not causing themselves spiritual or physical harm. Consequently, sport has obvious attractions in Islam: traditions record that Muḥammad raced with his wife 'Ā'ishah, and that he encouraged parents to teach their children swimming, riding and archery. Persian miniatures show Muslim women jointly playing polo with men in the same field. In the twenty-first century, some Muslim sociologists even argue that it should be obligatory for Muslim females to participate in sport of some kind.

At the same time, many Muslim women experience significant barriers to sports participation. These barriers include bans on the Islamic headscarf, commonly known as the hijab, cultural and familial barriers, and the lack of appropriate sports programs and facilities. Many Muslim female athletes have overcome these obstacles and used sports to empower themselves and others, such as through education, health and wellbeing, and a push for women's rights.

==== Islamic Solidarity Games ====
The Islamic Solidarity Games is a large multi-sport event held every four years in which all qualifying athletes from Organisation of Islamic Cooperation member countries can compete, regardless of their religious affiliation. The female International Athlete Ambassadors for Baku 2017—the most recent edition of the games—included Tunisian Olympic medallist wrestler Marwa Amri; taekwondo icons Elaine Teo (Malaysia) and Taleen Al Humaidi (Jordan); and the Palestinian swimmer Mary Al-Atrash.

The next edition of the Islamic Solidarity Games (2025) is scheduled to take place in Riyadh.

== Beauty ==
Both the concept and the reality of beauty are important in the Islamic religion: beauty (iḥsān, also translated as "virtue", "excellence", and "making beautiful") is the third element of the canonical definition of Islam after belief (īmān) and practice (islām). At 53:31, the Quran emphasises the importance of avoiding ugly actions, while at 10:26 it states: "Those who do what is beautiful will receive the most beautiful and increase [or more than this]."

=== Female beauty ===
Female beauty is a central theme in Islam, which regards it as "the most direct visible manifestation of God's beauty, gentleness, mercy and forgiveness". This theme is developed most famously in Islamic mysticism or Sufism. In her work The Mystical Dimensions of Islam, Annemarie Schimmel records the position of Ibn ʿArabī—who is generally regarded as the greatest Sufi—on "perceiving the divine through the medium of female beauty and seeing the female as the true revelation of God's mercy and creativity" as follows:

"The closing chapter of the Fuṣūṣ al-ḥikam, that on the Prophet Muhammad, centers around the famous tradition according to which the Prophet was given a love for perfumes and women and joy in prayer. Thus, Ibn 'Arabī could defend the idea that 'love of women belongs to the perfection of the gnostics, for it is inherited from the Prophet and is a divine love' (R 480). Woman reveals, for Ibn Arabī, the secret of the compassionate God. The grammatical fact that the word dhāt, 'essence', is feminine offers Ibn Arabī different methods to discover this feminine element in God."

==== Adornment ====
Silk; According to all schools of Islamic law, only women are permitted to wear pure silken garments next to the skin, although the schools of law differ about almost every other detail concerning silk, such as the permissibility of men wearing silk mixed with other fibers. In Islamic tradition, silk is strongly associated with Heaven. The Quran speaks in several places of the sumptuous fabrics to be enjoyed by the virtuous in Paradise: their garments will be made of silk (22:23 and 35:33), and they will recline on carpets lined with rich brocade (55:54).

Gold; Similarly, Sharia law requires that only women wear gold ornaments, such as jewelry. The intention behind this distinction is to help men maintain a state of sobriety, reserve, concentration, and spiritual poverty (the "perfections of the centre"), while women, who symbolize unfolding, infinitude, and manifestation, are not bound by the same constraints.

==== Public versus private appearance ====
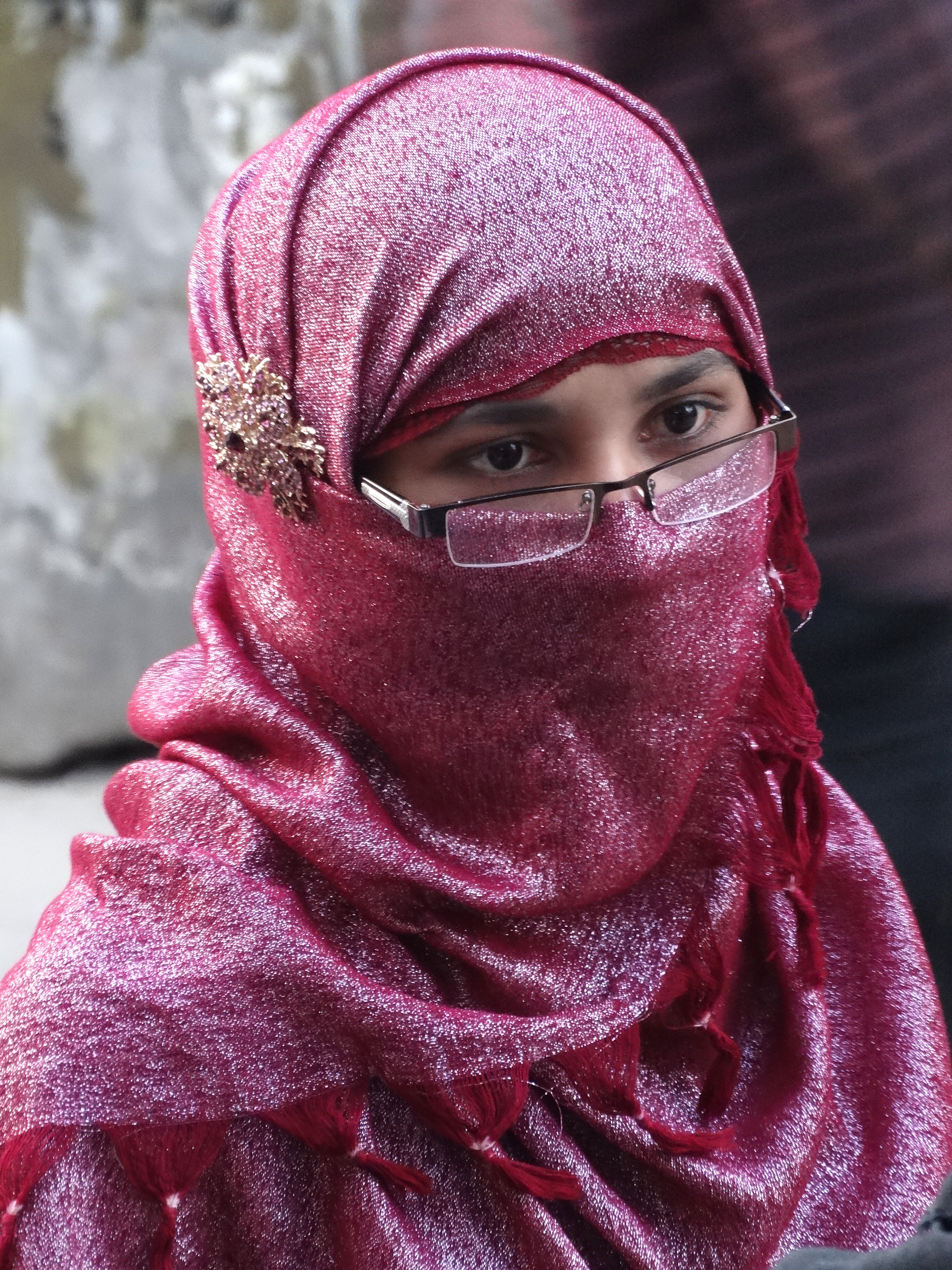
A Bengali woman wearing a pink niqab

Clothing such as ḥijābs, chādors, and burqas are typically worn in public only. 32% of countries in the European Union have bans on traditional Muslim headgear for women. Bans differ in enforcement, penalty for violation, and details of what type of headgear is considered "publicly acceptable" in countries with these bans in place. The United Nations Human Rights Committee has publicly condemned these bans due to their infringement of rights of women dressing a certain way for religious purposes. Muslim European women, specifically, have noted that their public wearing of Islamic headgear has posed obstacles when it comes to gaining employment. It is common for women to wear Western-style clothing in private. Global fashion retail chains including Zara and Victoria's Secret have branches in OIC member states such as Saudi Arabia.

==== Effect of globalization on Muslim women's couture ====
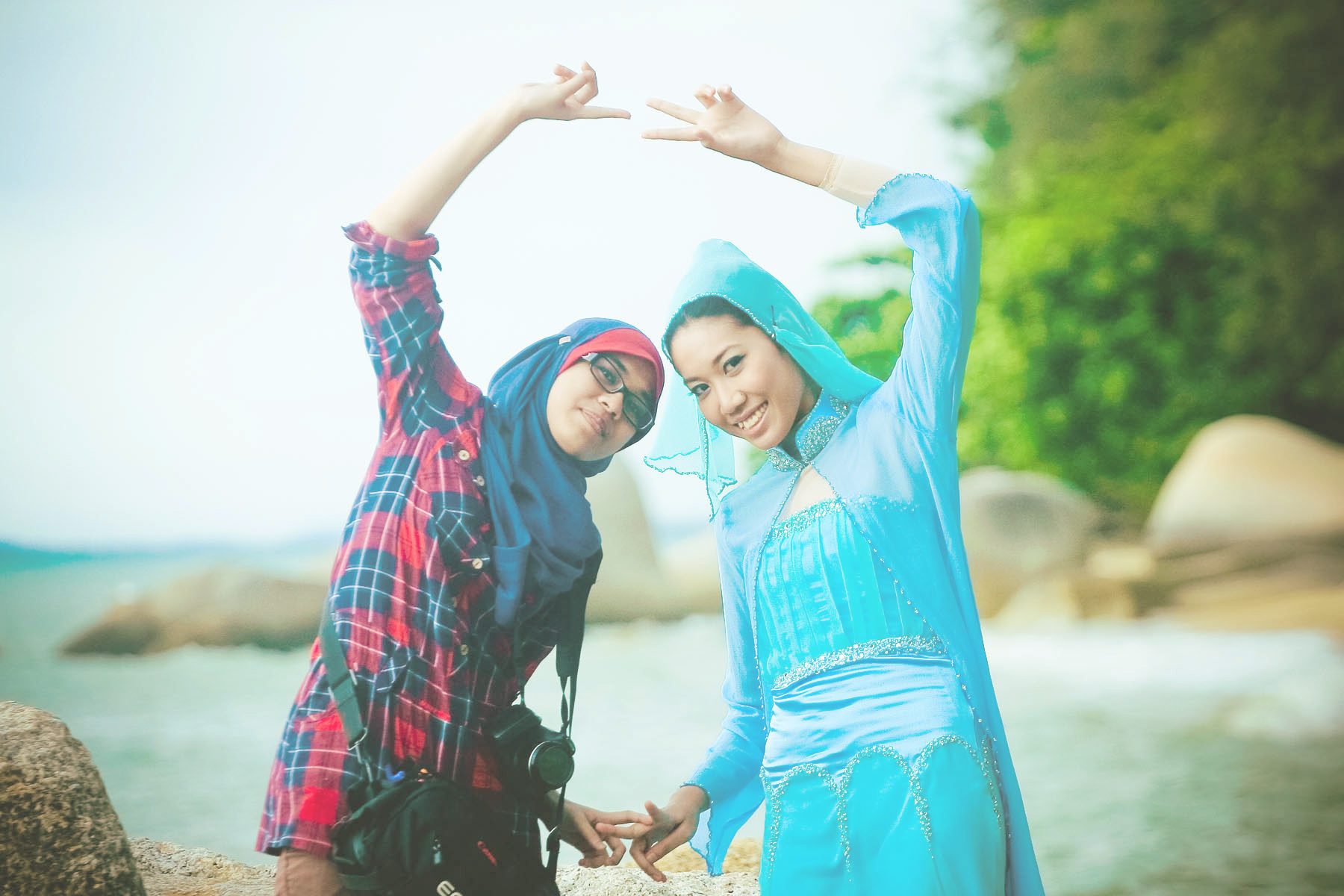
Two Malaysian women wearing contrasting styles of clothing: the (post-)modern hijab on the one hand (left), and a variant of the traditional Islamic kebaya blouse-shirt combination on the other. The kebaya is derived from the Arabic abaya (meaning "clothing") and is the national female dress of Indonesia.

The fashion media sector within the Muslim world for both Western and Islamic fashion has grown tremendously since the 1990s. Local editions of magazines from Marie Claire to Cosmopolitan are now published in a wide range of OIC member states, including Turkey, the UAE, Saudi Arabia, Malaysia and Indonesia, while fashion magazines specifically targeted at more overtly religious demographics are flourishing: the Turkish title Âlâ is reportedly outselling both Vogue and Elle within its home market, while Aquila Style claims a total circulation of 30,000 in three ASEAN states.

The 2014–15 Thomson Reuters State of the Global Islamic Economy Report forecasted that expenditure on clothing in OIC member states would reach US$484 billion by 2019.

== Love ==
Among classical Muslim authors, the notion of love was developed along three conceptual lines, conceived in an ascending hierarchical order: natural love, intellectual love, and divine love.

=== Romantic love ===
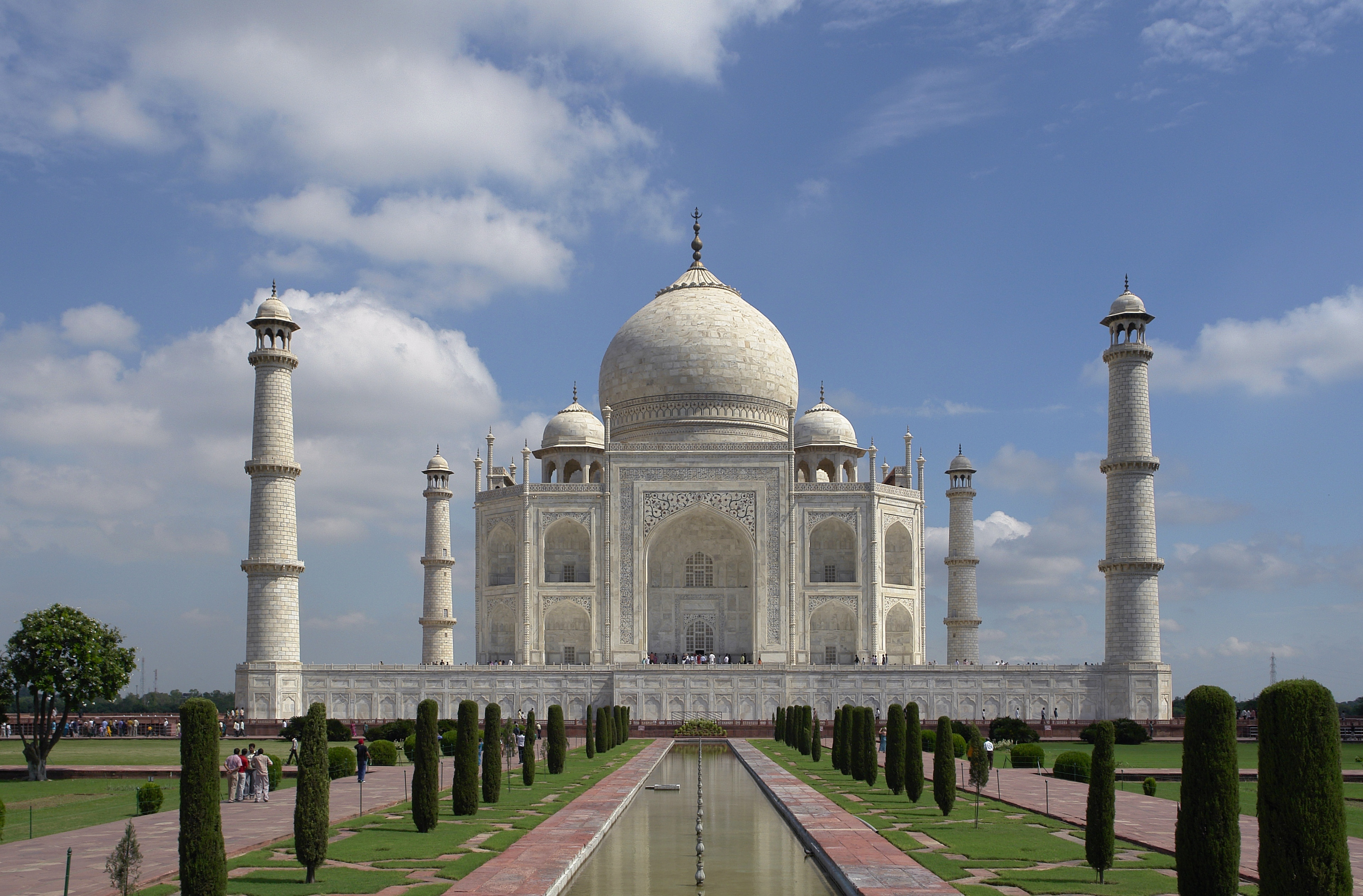
The Taj Mahal near Agra in India was commissioned by the Moghul Emperor Shah Jahan (1628–1658) in memory of his wife Mumtaz Mahal, and completed in 1648. It is studded with numerous inscriptions, almost all of which are from Persian poetry and the Quran. Scholars have suggested that the Taj Mahal complex is a representation of paradise.

In traditional Islamic societies, love between men and women was widely celebrated, and both the popular and classical literature of the Muslim world is replete with works on this theme. Throughout Islamic history, intellectuals, theologians, and mystics have extensively discussed the nature and characteristics of romantic love (ishq). In its most common intellectual interpretation of the Islamic Golden Age, ishq refers to an irresistible desire to obtain possession of the beloved, expressing a deficiency that the lover must remedy to reach perfection.

The Arab love story of Lāyla and Majnūn was arguably more widely known amongst Muslims than that of Romeo and Juliet in (Northern) Europe, while the Persian author Jāmī's retelling of the story of Yusuf (Joseph) and Zulaykhā—based upon the narrative of Surat Yusuf in the Quran—is a seminal text in the Persian, Urdu, and Bengali literary canons. The growth of affection (mawadda) into passionate love (ishq) received its most probing and realistic analysis in The Ring of the Dove by the Andalusian scholar Ibn Hazm. The theme of romantic love continues to be developed in the modern and even postmodern fiction from the Islamic world: The Black Book (1990) by the Nobel Prize winner Orhan Pamuk is a nominal detective story with extensive meditations on mysticism and obsessive love, while another Turkish writer, Elif Şafak, intertwines romantic love and Sufism in her 2010 book The Forty Rules of Love: A Novel of Rumi.

In Sufism, romantic love is viewed as a metaphysical metaphor for the love of God. However, the importance of love extends beyond the metaphorical. This is evident in the romantic relationship between Rumi, who is widely recognised as the greatest poet of Sufism, and his mentor Shams Tabrizi. IbnʿArabī posited also that for a man, sex with a woman is the occasion for experiencing God's 'greatest self-disclosure' (the position is similar vice versa):

The most intense and perfect contemplation of God is through women, and the most intense union is the conjugal act.

This emphasis on the sublimity of the conjugal act holds true for both this world and the next: the fact that Islam considers sexual relationships one of the ultimate pleasures of paradise is well-known; moreover, there is no suggestion that this is limited only for the sake of producing children. Accordingly, (and in common with civilisations such as the Chinese, Indian, and Japanese), the Islamic world has historically generated significant works of erotic literature and technique, and many centuries before such a genre became culturally acceptable in the West: Richard Burton's substantially ersatz 1886 translation of The Perfumed Garden of Sensual Delight, a fifteenth-century sex manual authored by Muḥammad ibn Muḥammad al-Nafzawi, was labelled as being 'for private circulation only' owing to the puritanical mores and corresponding censorship laws of Victorian England.

=== Love of women ===
Particularly within the context of religion—a domain which is often associated with sexual asceticism—Muḥammad is notable for emphasising the importance of loving women. According to a famous ḥadīth, Muḥammad stated: "Three things of this world of yours were made lovable to me: women, perfume—and the coolness of my eye was placed in the ritual prayer". This is enormously significant because in the Islamic faith, Muḥammad is by definition the most perfect human being and the most perfect male: his love for and treatment of women shows that the perfection of the human state is connected with love for other human beings, not simply with love for God. More specifically, it illustrates that male perfection lies in women and, by implication, female perfection in men. Consequently, the love Muḥammad had for women is obligatory on all men, since he is the model of perfection that must be emulated.

Prominent figures in Islamic mysticism have elaborated on this theme. Ibn 'Arabī reflected on the above ḥadīth as follows: "...he [Muḥammad] mentioned women [as one of three things from God's world made lovable to him]. Do you think that which would take him far from his Lord was made lovable to him? Of course not. That which would bring him near to his Lord was made lovable to him."

"He who knows the measure of women and their mystery will not renounce love for them. On the contrary, one of the perfections of the gnostic is love for them, for this is a prophetic heritage and a divine love. For the Prophet said, '[women] were made lovable to me.' Hence he ascribed his love for them only to God. Ponder this chapter—you will see wonders!"

Ibn 'Arabī held that witnessing God in the female human form is the most perfect mode of witnessing: if Muḥammad was made to love women, it is because women reflect God.

According to Gai Eaton, there are several other ḥadīths on the same theme which underline Muḥammad's teaching on the importance of loving women:

- "The best of you is the one who is best to his wife."
- "The whole world is to be enjoyed, but the best thing in the world is a good woman."

Another well-known ḥadīth explicitly states that loving conduct towards one's wife is synonymous with advanced religious understanding:

- "The most perfect in faith amongst believers is he who is best in manner and kindest to his wife."

== Sexuality ==
=== General appearance ===
In contrast to Christianity—where sex is sanctified through marriage—in the Islamic conception, sexuality in and of itself is sacred and a blessing; as per Ibn 'Arabī's formulation, sex is a sublime act which can draw its practitioners closer to God. Marriage in Islam is a contract drawn up according to Sharia to legitimise sexual relations and protect the rights of both partners. However, in common with Christianity and Judaism, sexual activity outside of marriage is perceived as a serious sin in the eyes of God. A high value is placed on female chastity and exhibitionism is prohibited. (See: Haya (Islam) and fahisha)

Female sexual satisfaction is given significant prominence in the Islamic faith and its classical literature. As recorded by the British Muslim writer Ruqayyah Waris Maqsood in her book The Muslim Marriage Guide: "the early Muslims regarded sexual prowess and the ability to satisfy a woman as being an essential part of manhood. The niece of Aisha, A'isha bint Talhah, married Umar ibn Ubaydilah. According to the Hadiths, on their wedding night he made love to her no fewer than seven times, so that when morning came, she told him: 'You are a perfect Muslim in every way, even in this!'"

Islam requires both husband and wife/wives to meet their conjugal duties. Religious qadis (judges) have admonished the man or women who fail to meet these duties. In this context, the Muslim caliph Umar ibn Al-Khattab (584–644) believed that a married woman had the right to sex at least once every four days, while according to the hadith scholar, jurist and mystic Abu Talib al-Makki (d.996), "if [a husband] knows that [his wife] needs more, he is obliged to comply".

==== Recommendations and prohibitions ====
Muhammad underlined the importance of foreplay and emotional intimacy in sexual relations, as the following hadith illustrates:

"[The Prophet Muḥammad said] 'Not one of you should fall upon his wife like an animal; but let there first be a messenger between you.' 'And what is that messenger?' they asked, and [the Prophet Muḥammad] replied: 'Kisses and words.'

Islamic luminaries expanded on this theme. The philosopher, mystic and jurist Al-Ghazālī (c. 1058–1111) stated that "Sex should begin with gentle words and kissing", while the Indian scholar al-Zabīdī (1732–1790) added to this exhortation in his commentary on Al-Ghazālī's magnum opus, The Revival of the Religious Sciences (Iḥiyāʾ ʿulūm ad-dīn): "This should include not only the cheeks and lips; and then he should caress the breasts and nipples, and every part of her body." Classical Islamic scholars have written extensively about the art and desirability of husband and wife attaining simultaneous orgasms; Al-Ghazali gives the following counsel in his key work, The Revival of the Religious Sciences (Iḥiyāʾ ʿulūm ad-dīn):

"When he has come to his orgasm (inzal), he should wait for his wife until she comes to her orgasm likewise; for her climax may well come slowly. If he arouses her desire, and then sits back from her, this will hurt her, and any disparity in their orgasms will certainly produce a sense of estrangement. A simultaneous orgasm will be the most delightful for her, especially since her husband will be distracted by his own orgasm from her, and she will not therefore be afflicted by shyness."

After sex, as well as menstruation, Islam requires men and women to do ghusl (major ritual washing with water, ablutions), and in some Islamic communities duaa' (prayers seeking forgiveness and purification), as sex and menstruation are considered some of the causes that makes men and women religiously impure (najis). Some Islamic jurists suggest touching and foreplay, without any penetration, may qualify wudu (minor ritual washing) as sufficient form of religiously required ablution. Muslim men and women must also abstain from sex during a ritual fast, and during all times while on a pilgrimage to Mecca, as sexual act, touching of sexual parts and emission of sexual bodily fluids are considered ritually dirty.

Sexual intercourse is not allowed to a Muslim woman during menstruation, postpartum period, during fasting and certain religious activities, disability and in iddah after divorce or widowhood. Homosexual relations and same sex marriages are forbidden to both genders in Islam. In vitro fertilization (IVF) is acceptable in Islam; but ovum donation along with sperm donation, embryo donation are prohibited by Islam. These marriages meet with varying degrees of social approval, depending on the milieu. Some debated fatwas from Shia sect of Islam, however, allow third party participation.

According to some Hadiths like Sahih Muslim, Islam permits only vaginal sex.Sahih Muslim, 8:3365 There is disagreement among Islamic scholars on proper interpretation of Islamic law on permissible sex between a husband and wife, with claims that non-vaginal sex within a marriage is disapproved but not forbidden. Anal intercourse and sex during menstruation are prohibited, as is violence and force against a partner's will. However, these are the only restrictions; as the Quran says at 2:223 (Sūratu l-Baqarah): 'Your women are your fields; go to your women as you wish'.

=== Women's bodies, another interventions and restrictions ===
==== Age of sexual competence ====
Child marriage, has come to be discouraged in most countries, but it persists to some extent in some select parts of the Muslim world. The age of marriage in Islam for women varies with country. Traditionally, Islam has permitted marriage of girls below the age often, because Sharia considers the practices of Muhammad a basis for Islamic law. According to Sahih Bukhari and Sahih Muslim, the two most authentic Sunni hadiths books, Muhammed married Aisha, his third wife, when she was six and consummated the marriage when she reached the age of nine or ten. This version of events is rejected by Shia Muslims and disputed by some Sunni scholars.

Some Islamic scholars suggest that it is not the calendar age that matters, rather it is the biological age of the girl that determines when she can be married under Islamic law. According to these Islamic scholars, marriageable age in Islam is when a girl has reached sexual maturity, as determined by her nearest male guardian; this age can be, claim these Islamic scholars, less than 10 years, or 12, or another age depending on each girl. Some clerics and conservative elements of Muslim society, in various communities around the world, have insisted that it is their Islamic right to marry girls below age 15. In December 2019, Saudi Arabia changed the law and raised the age of marriage to 18.

===== Menstruation =====
Muslim women are relieved from the duty of performing salah whilst she is menstruating or during postpartum period, because bodily fluids (in this case, blood) are considered ritually impure in Islam. According to some scholars, Muslim women may not enter a mosque. Some Muslim scholars suggest that the woman should stay in her house, or near her house, during this state. Some Islamic jurists claim that this is an incorrect interpretation of Sharia, and suggest the Islamic intent was about hygiene, not about religious ritual cleanliness. Some scholars say that it is not permitted for menstruating women to read the Quran. Others say it is possible, in some circumstances.

==== Contraception ====
From very early times various methods of contraception have been practiced in Islam, and Muslim jurists of the two major sects of Islam, Sunni and Shia, generally agree that contraception and family planning are not forbidden by Sharia; the use of contraceptive devices is permitted if the marital partners agree. All the Islamic schools of law from the tenth to the nineteenth century gave contraception their serious consideration. They dealt principally with coitus interruptus, the most common method, and unanimously agreed that it was licit provided the free wife gave her permission, because she had rights to children and to sexual fulfilment which withdrawal was believed to diminish. From the writings of the jurists it emerges that other methods of birth control—mostly intravaginal tampons—were also used by premodern women and the commonest view was that these should only be employed if the husband also agreed.

Given the era and the fact that both Christian and Jewish tradition outlawed contraception, the attitude of Muslims towards birth control has been characterised as being remarkably pragmatic; they also possessed a sophisticated knowledge of possible birth control methods. Medieval doctors like Ibn Sina (Avicenna) regarded birth control as a normal part of medicine, and devoted chapters to contraception and abortion in their textbooks (although the permissibility of abortion within Islamic thought varies according to a number of factors; Islam views the family as sacred and children as a gift from God). According to medieval Muslims, birth control was employed to avoid a large number of dependents to safeguard property, to guarantee the education of a child, to protect a woman from the risks of childbirth—especially if she was young or ill—or simply to preserve her health and beauty.

===== Female infanticide =====
Islam condemns female infanticide.

When the female (infant), buried alive, is questioned—For what crime she was killed?

— Quran, 81:8

In some Islamic populations, sex-selective female infanticide is of concern because of abnormally high boy to girl ratios at birth. In Islamic Azerbaijan, for example, the birth sex ratio was in the 105 to 108 range, before the collapse of the Soviet Union in the early 1990s. After the collapse, the birth sex ratios in Azerbaijan has sharply climbed to over 115 and remained high for the last 20 years. The persistently observed 115 boys for every 100 girls born suggests sex-selective abortion of females in Azerbaijan in the last 20 years. Other Muslim-majority countries with high birth sex ratio, implying female sex-selective abortion, include Albania (112) and Pakistan (111).

==== Female genital mutilation ====
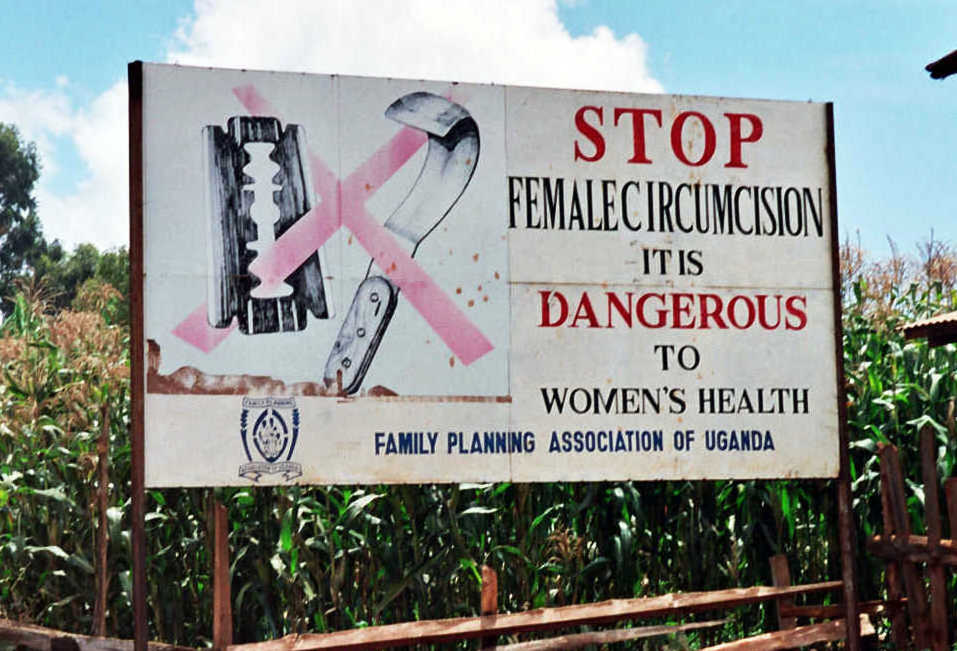
A poster for a campaign against female genital mutilation ('FGM') in Christian-majority Uganda. In the African states of Tanzania, Nigeria and Niger, FGM is more prevalent amongst Christians than Muslims. The highest levels of support for FGM can be found in Mali, Sierra Leone, Guinea, Gambia, Somalia, and Egypt.

==== The classical position ====
There is no mention of female circumcision—let alone other forms of female genital mutilation—in the Quran. Furthermore, Muḥammad did not subject any of his daughters to this practice, which is itself of real significance as it does not form part of his spoken or acted example. Moreover, the origins of female circumcision are not Islamic: it is first thought to have been practiced in ancient Egypt. Alternatively, it has been suggested that the practice may be an old African puberty rite that was passed on to Egypt by cultural diffusion.

Notwithstanding these facts, there is a belief amongst some Muslims—particularly though not entirely exclusively in (sub-Saharan) Africa—that female circumcision (specifically the cutting of the prepuce or hood of the clitoris) is religiously vindicated by the existence of a handful of ḥadīths which apparently recommend it. However, these ḥadīths are generally regarded as inauthentic, unreliable and weak, and therefore as having no legislative foundation and/or practical application.

==== Islamic perspectives on FGM ====
In answering the question of how "Islamic" female circumcision is, Haifaa A. Jawad—an academic specialising in Islamic thought and the author of The Rights of Women in Islam: An Authentic Approach—has concluded that "the practice has no Islamic foundation whatsoever. It is nothing more than an ancient custom which has been falsely assimilated to the Islamic tradition, and with the passage of time it has been presented and accepted (in some Muslim countries) as an Islamic injunction." According to Haifaa Jawad, the argument which states that there is an indirect correlation between Islam and female circumcision fails to explain why female circumcision is not practiced in much of the Islamic world, and conversely is practiced in Latin American countries such as Brazil, Mexico and Peru. However, more than half of the cases documented by Unicef are concentrated in just 3 countries: Indonesia, Egypt, and Ethiopia.

The French intellectual, journalist, and translator Renée Saurel observed that female circumcision and FGM more generally directly contradict Islam's sacred text: "The Koran, contrary to Christianity and Judaism, permits and recommends that the woman be given physical and psychological pleasure, pleasure found by both partners during the act of love. Forcibly split, torn, and severed tissues are neither conducive to sensuality nor to the blessed feeling given and shared when participating in the quest for pleasure and the escape from pain."

The Egyptian feminist Nawal El-Saadawi reasons that the creation of the clitoris per se is a direct Islamic argument against female circumcision: "If religion comes from God, how can it order man to cut off an organ created by Him as long as that organ is not diseased or deformed? God does not create the organs of the body haphazardly without a plan. It is not possible that He should have created the clitoris in woman's body only in order that it be cut off at an early stage in life. This is a contradiction into which neither true religion nor the Creator could possibly fall. If God has created the clitoris as a sexually sensitive organ, whose sole function seems to be the procurement of sexual pleasure for women, it follows that He also considers such pleasure for women as normal and legitimate, and therefore as an integral part of mental health."

Sheikh Abbas el Hocine Bencheikh, a diplomat and Rector of the L'institut Musulman at the Grande Mosquée de Paris, pointed to the total lack of Islamic theological justification for female circumcision: "If circumcision for the man (though not compulsory) has an aesthetic and hygienic purpose, there is no existing religious Islamic text of value to be considered in favour of female excision, as proven by the fact that this practice is totally non-existent in most of the Islamic countries."

Mahmud Shaltut, the former Sheikh of Al-Azhar in Cairo—one of the most important religious offices in Sunni Islam—also stated that female circumcision has no theological basis: "Islamic legislation provides a general principle, namely that should meticulous and careful examination of certain issues prove that it is definitely harmful or immoral, then it should be legitimately stopped to put an end to this damage or immorality. Therefore, since the harm of excision has been established, excision of the clitoris of females is not a mandatory obligation, nor is it a Sunnah."

==== Initiatives to end FGM in the OIC ====
In the twenty-first century, a number of high-ranking religious offices within the OIC have urged the cessation of all forms of FGM:

1. A 2006 international conference convened by Egypt's Dar al ifta—an influential body which issues legal opinions on Islamic law and jurisprudence—concluded "that the [female genital] mutilation presently practised in some parts of Egypt, Africa, and elsewhere represents a deplorable custom which finds no justification in the authoritative sources of Islam, the Quran and the practice of the Prophet Muḥammad...all measures must be taken to put a halt to this unacceptable tradition."
2. A November 2006 conference at Al-Azhar University in Cairo held under the auspices of the Grand Mufti of Egypt passed a resolution—with the same legal weight as fatwa—that FGM was to be considered a punishable offence, because it constitutes "an act of aggression and a crime against humanity".
3. In 2007 the Cairo-based Al-Azhar Supreme Council of Islamic Research, an entity belonging to what is generally regarded as one of the most significant theological universities in the OIC, ruled that female genital mutilation has no basis in Islamic law.
4. In 2012, Professor Dr. Ekmeleddin İhsanoğlu—the then Secretary-General of the Organisation of Islamic Cooperation—urged countries to abolish female genital mutilation (FGM), saying the practice was against Islam and human rights: "This practice is a ritual that has survived over centuries and must be stopped as Islam does not support it."
5. In 2016, the OIC Permanent Observer Mission to the United Nations reaffirmed its determination to eliminate FGM/C by 2030, in accordance with a global target set by the UN in the context of the Sustainable Development Goals.

==== Recorded prevalence of FGM in the OIC ====
According to UNICEF (2014), twenty-six of the twenty-nine countries in which female genital mutilation is classified as 'concentrated' are in sub-Saharan Africa: there was no recorded prevalence in any non-African OIC member state outside Yemen (19% prevalence) and Iraq (8%). Subsequent data confirms that female genital mutilation is not an exclusively African problem, and is found in several Islamic-majority countries of OIC, like Indonesia.

== Marriage ==
=== Family ===
With the coming of Islam, the family replaced the tribe as the basic unit of Arab society, and today the family is still the primary means of social organization in the Islamic world. As in many other traditional societies, the family in Muslim-majority countries is not restricted to the nuclear model solely consisting of parents and children, but is instead typically made up of a larger extended family network which includes grandparents, uncles, aunts, in-laws and cousins.

==== Pregnancy, childbirth, and breastfeeding ====
Mothers shall suckle their children for two whole years; (that is) for those who wish to complete the suckling. The duty of feeding and clothing nursing mothers in a seemly manner is upon the father of the child. No-one should be charged beyond his capacity. A mother should not be made to suffer because of her child, nor should he to whom the child is born (be made to suffer) because of his child. And on the (father's) heir is incumbent the like of that (which was incumbent on the father). If they desire to wean the child by mutual consent and (after) consultation, it is no sin for them; and if ye wish to give your children out to nurse, it is no sin for you, provide that ye pay what is due from you in kindness. Observe your duty to Allah, and know that Allah is Seer of what ye do. (Al-Quran 2:233)

Muḥammad stated that if a woman dies in childbirth, she is counted as a martyr.

==== Motherhood ====
A famous hadith of Muḥammad states that "Heaven lies under the feet of mothers", and accordingly—and like all traditional systems—Islam has honored the work of homemaker and mother as being of the highest value. While there is nothing in Islamic teachings that precludes women from working and receiving wages, as per Seyyed Hossein Nasr's The Heart of Islam: Enduring Values for Humanity, "Islamic society has never thought that working in an office is of a higher order of importance than bringing up one's children."

=== Legal framework ===
Marriage is the central institution of family life and society, and therefore the central institution of Islam. On a technical level, it is accomplished through a contract which is confirmed by the bride's reception of a dowry or mahr, and by the witnessing of the bride's consent to the marriage. A woman has the freedom to propose to a man of her liking, either orally or in writing. Muḥammad himself was the subject of a spoken marriage proposal from a Muslim lady which was worded "I present myself to you", although ultimately Muḥammad solemnized her marriage to another man.

Within the marriage contract itself, the bride has the right to stipulate her own conditions. These conditions usually pertain to such issues as marriage terms (e.g. that her husband may not take another wife), and divorce terms (e.g. that she may dissolve the union at her own initiative if she deems it necessary). In addition, dowries—one on marriage, and another deferred in case of divorce—must be specified and written down; they should also be of substance. The dowry is the exclusive property of the wife and should not be given away, neither to her family nor her relatives. According to the Quran (at 4:2), the wife may freely choose to give part of their dowry to the husband. Fiqh doctrine says a woman's property, held exclusively in her name cannot be appropriated by her husband, brother or father. For many centuries, this stood in stark contrast with the more limited property rights of women in (Christian) Europe. Accordingly, Muslim women in contemporary America are sometimes shocked to find that, even though they were careful to list their assets as separate, these can be considered joint assets after marriage.

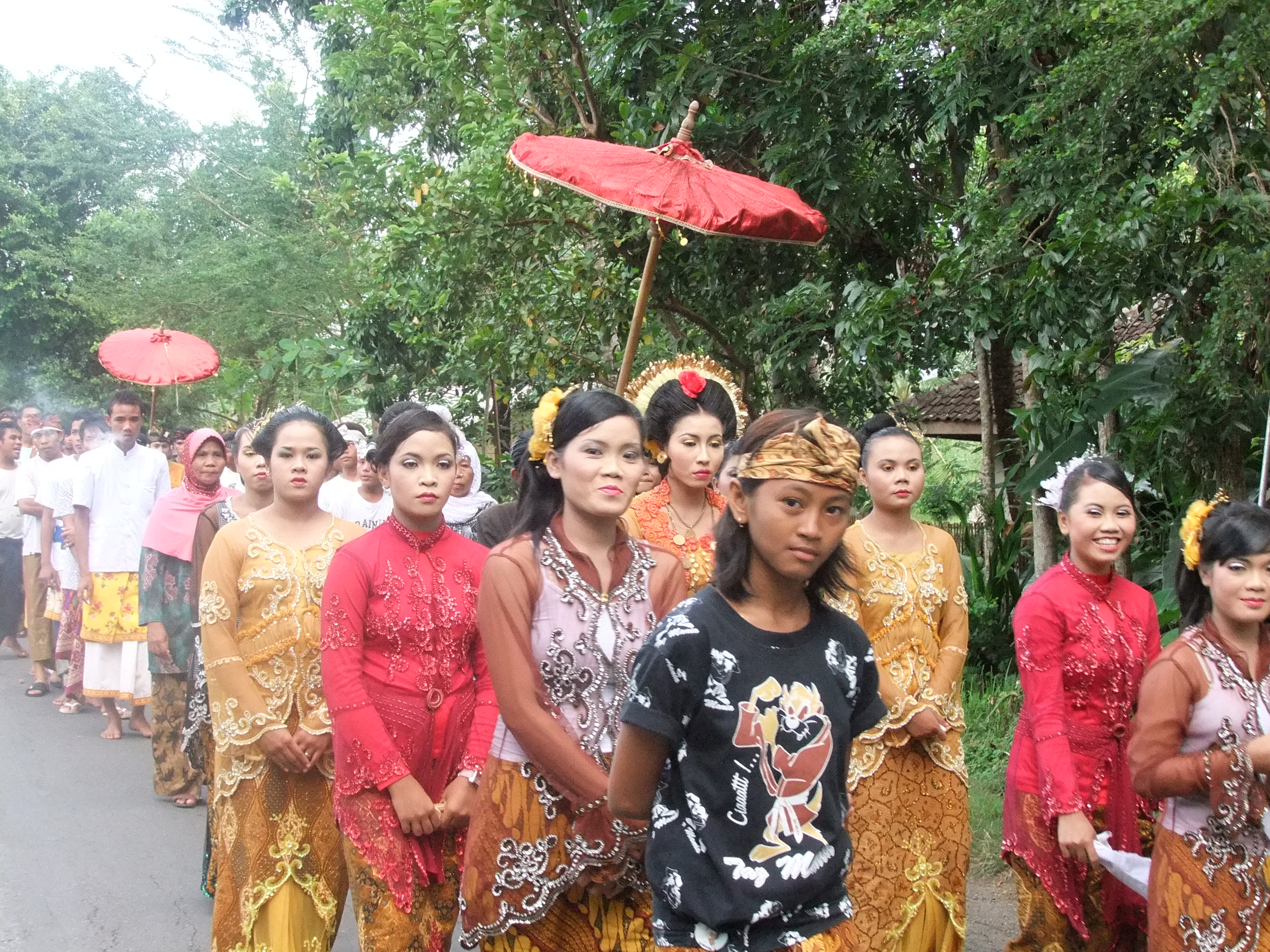
A bridal procession accompanied by live music in Lombok, Indonesia. According to the National Statistical Bureau of Indonesia, the mean age of marriage for women was 22.3 years in 2010, an increase on the 1970 average of 19 years; the corresponding figures for men were 25.7 years and 23 years respectively.

=== Marriage ceremony and celebrations ===
When agreement to the marriage has been expressed and witnessed, those present recite the Al-Fatiha prayer (the opening chapter of the Quran). Normally, marriages are not contracted in mosques but in private homes or at the offices of a judge (qāḍi). The format and content of the ceremony (if there is one) is often defined by national or tribal customs, as are the celebrations ('urs) that accompany it. In some parts of the Islamic world these may include processions in which the bride gift is put on display; receptions where the bride is seen adorned in elaborate costumes and jewelry; and ceremonial installation of the bride in the new house to which she may be carried in a litter (a type of carriage). The groom may ride through the streets on a horse, followed by his friends and well-wishers, and there is always a feast called the walīmah.

=== Historical commonality of divorce ===
In contrast to the Western and Orient world where divorce was relatively uncommon until modern times, divorce was a more common occurrence in certain parts of the late medieval Muslim world. In the Mamluk Sultanate and Ottoman Empire, the rate of divorce was high. The work of the scholar and historian Al-Sakhawi (1428–1497) on the lives of women show that the marriage pattern of Egyptian and Syrian urban society in the fifteenth century was greatly influenced by easy divorce, and practically untouched by polygamy. Earlier Egyptian documents from the eleventh to thirteenth centuries also showed a similar but more extreme pattern: in a sample of 273 women, 118 (45%) married a second or third time. Edward Lane's careful observation of urban Egypt in the early nineteenth century suggests that the same regime of frequent divorce and rare polygamy was still applicable in these last days of traditional society. In the early 20th century, some villages in western Java and the Malay Peninsula had divorce rates as high as 70%.

=== Polygyny ===
Marriage customs vary in Muslim dominated countries. Islamic law allows polygamy where a Muslim man can be married to four wives at the same time, under restricted conditions, but it is not widespread. As the Sharia demands that polygamous men treat all wives equally, classical Islamic scholars opined that it is preferable to avoid polygamy altogether, so one does not even come near the chance of committing the forbidden deed of dealing unjustly between the wives. The practice of polygamy is allowed, but not recommended. In some countries, polygamy is restricted by new family codes, for example the Moudawwana in Morocco. Iran allow Shia men to enter into additional temporary marriages, beyond the four allowed marriages, such as the practice of sigheh marriages, and Nikah Mut'ah in Iraq.

A marriage of pleasure, where a man pays a sum of money to a woman or her family in exchange for a temporary spousal relationship, is found and considered legal among Shia faith, for example in Iran after 1979. Temporary marriages are forbidden in Sunni Islam. Among Shia, the number of temporary marriages can be unlimited, recognized with an official temporary marriage certificate, and divorce is unnecessary because the temporary marriage automatically expires on the date and time specified on the certificate. Payment to the woman by the man is mandatory, in every temporary marriage and considered as mahr. The minimum duration of a temporary marriage is debated between scholars, with some saying the minimum duration is as low as 3 days and others saying it is as high as one year. Its practitioners cite Sharia law as permitting the practise. Women's rights groups have condemned it as a form of legalized prostitution.

=== Concubinage ===
The Hanbali jurist Ibn Qudama explains that a man is entitled to have sexual relations with his concubines, to employ her service, to hire her out and to marry her. However he is not allowed to sell or transfer ownership of his concubines. Concubines were at times housed in harems which maintained their modesty and privilege. Some harems were guarded by eunuchs.

In regards to female slaves, who are termed, 'what your right hands possess', Ibn Kathir in his Tafsir exegesis of Al-Mu'minoon 23:5–6, writes that "a man is allowed to have sexual relations with his slave-girl as with his wife". Malik ibn Anas cites a report in which "Umar b. al-Khattab says that when a female slave gives birth to a child by her master, then the slave becomes an umm walad (mother of a child, concubine)." Ibn al-Humam adds that the slave-owner must acknowledge the kinship of the child.

Writing in, Concubines and Courtesans: Women and Slavery in Islamic History, the authors say that the Quran's endorsement for sexual relations with whom, "your right hand possess" meant that concubines and their children were considered legitimate and not a product of zina. Hence, they were not discriminated like their counterparts in Christendom were. Rabb Intisar claims that Islamic sources treat non-consensual sex with slaves as zina or rape. However, Kecia Ali disputes this and says that she is unable to find this position within premodern Muslim legal tradition. Some Muslim scholars such as Muhammad Asad and Mustafa Islamoğlu completely rejected any kind of concubinage in Islam, stating that 'sexual relations with female slaves are permitted only on the basis of marriage, and that in this respect there is no difference between them and free women; consequently, concubinage is ruled out.'

=== Polyandry ===
Polyandry, the practice of a woman having more than one husband (even temporarily, after payment of a sum of money to the man or the man's family), by contrast, is not permitted. However, during the pre-Islamic period, women were able to practice polyandry.

=== Endogamy ===
Muḥammad quite deliberately did not recommend cousin marriage as his sunnah or path to be followed; out of his thirteen wives, only one—the seventh, Zaynab bint Jahsh, a divorcée said by historians to have been very beautiful—was his cousin. The rest of his wives came from diverse social and even religious backgrounds, with Safiyya bint Huyayy and Rayhana bint Zayd being of Jewish origin.

Despite this, endogamy is common in some Muslim-majority countries. The observed endogamy is primarily consanguineous marriages, where the bride and the groom share a biological grandparent or other near ancestor. The most common observed marriages are first cousin marriages, followed by second cousin marriages. Consanguineous endogamous marriages are most common for women in Muslim communities in the Middle East, North Africa and Islamic Central Asia. About 1 in 3 of all marriages in Saudi Arabia, Iran and Pakistan are first cousin marriages; while overall consanguineous endogamous marriages exceed 65 to 80% in various Islamic populations of the Middle East, North Africa and Islamic Central Asia. Consanguineous endogamous marriages are common for women in Islam. Consanguineous marriage rates in the Muslim world range from 5–9% in Malaysia to >50% in Saudi Arabia. Over 65% of all marriages in Saudi Arabia and Pakistan are endogamous and consanguineous arranged marriages; more than 40% of all marriages are endogamous and consanguineous in Mauritania, Libya, Sudan, Iraq, Iran, Jordan, Syria, Yemen, Kuwait, UAE and Oman.

=== Forbidden marriages ===
In the interests of transparency, clandestine marriages are not permitted under Islamic law; weddings must be public—a commitment made before society. The European Council for Fatwa and Research has ruled that a state registration of a marriage between Muslims, if attended by two witnesses, fulfills the minimum requirements for a religious marriage under the Sharia because it demonstrates (a) mutual consent; and (b) a public declaration of commitment.

Some marriages are forbidden between Muslim women and Muslim men, according to Sharia. In the Quran, Surah An-Nisa gives a list of forbidden marriages.^{[Quran 4:22-24]} Examples for women include marrying one's stepson, biological son, biological father, biological brother (including half-brother from either side), biological nephew, biological uncle, milk son or milk brother, husband of her biological daughter, a stepfather who has had sexual relations with her biological mother, and father-in-law. There are disputes between Hanafis, Malikis, Shafi'is and Hanabalis schools of Sunni Islamic jurisprudence on whether and which such marriages are irregular but not void if already in place (fasid), and which are void (batil) marriages.

=== Interfaith marriages and women ===
Interfaith marriages are recognized between Muslims and non-Muslim People of the Book (usually enumerated as Jews, Christians, and Sabians). Historically, in Islamic culture and traditional Islamic law Muslim women have been forbidden from marrying Christian or Jewish men, whereas Muslim men have been permitted to marry Christian or Jewish women. Although historically Sunni Islam prohibited Muslim women to marry Non-Muslim men in interfaith marriages, in various parts of the world interfaith marriages between Muslim women and Non-Muslim men take place at substantial rates, contravening the traditional Sunni understanding of ijma. In the United States, for example, about one in ten Muslim women are married to non-Muslim men, including about one in six Muslim women under 40 and about one in five, or 20% of, Muslim women who describe themselves as less devoutly religious. The tradition of reformist and progressive Islam permits marriage between Muslim women and Non-Muslim men; Islamic scholars opining this view include Khaleel Mohammed, Hassan Al-Turabi, among others. Ayse Elmali-Karakaya says in her 2020 study, that impact of Muslim women's marriage to non-Muslims men has been found to be positive. Elmali-Karakaya says since Muslim women's feelings of being an ambassador of Islam and Muslims in their inter-religious family, interfaith marriages help expansion of their religious knowledge.

According to Sharia law, it is legal for a Muslim man to marry a Christian or Jewish woman, or a woman of any of the divinely-revealed religions, while a Muslim woman is not permitted to marry outside her religion. A significant number of non-Muslim men have entered into the Islamic faith to satisfy this aspect of the religious law where it is in force. With deepening globalisation, it has become more common for Muslim women to marry non-Muslim men who remain outside Islam. These marriages meet with varying degrees of social approval, depending on the milieu. However, conversions of non-Muslim men to Islam for the purpose of marriage are still numerous, in part because the procedure for converting to Islam is relatively expeditious.

Additionally, according to Islamic law, if a Muslim man wishes to marry a Christian or Jewish woman, he must get to know her parents and ask for permission to marry their daughter. She must also be devout in her faith and chaste.

The majority of Muslim scholars have historically read Surah 60, verse 10, which forbids female converts from returning to their non-Muslim husbands, as an injunction against any Muslim women marrying non-Muslim men.

Kecia Ali argues that such interpretations unfairly presume that women are inherently subordinate to their husbands, which, if true, could result in children being brought up as non-Muslims if their father is non-Muslim. Additionally, the Quranic verse in question mentions unbelievers, but not people of the Jewish or Christian faiths, whom the Quran does identify as suitable partners for Muslim men. The Quran thus does not give any general guidance on whether Muslim women may marry "non-Muslim" men, but rather "discusses specific categories of potential spouses."

=== Behavior and rights within marriage ===
Islamic law and practice recognize gender disparity, in part, by assigning separate rights and obligations to a woman in married life. A woman's space is in the private sphere of the home, and a man's is in the public sphere. Women must primarily fulfill marital and maternal responsibilities, whereas men are financial and administrative stewards of their families. According to Sayyid Qutb, the Quran "gives the man the right of guardianship or superiority over the family structure to prevent dissension and friction between the spouses. The equity of this system lies in the fact that God both favoured the man with the necessary qualities and skills for the 'guardianship' and also charged him with the duty to provide for the structure's upkeep."

The Quran considers the love between men and women to be a Sign of God.^{[Quran 30:21]} This said, the Quran also permits men to first admonish, then lightly tap, if he suspects nushuz (disobedience, disloyalty, rebellion, ill conduct) in his wife.^{[Quran 4:34]}

In Islam, there is no coverture, an idea central in European, American as well as in non-Islamic Asian common law, and the legal basis for the principle of marital property. An Islamic marriage is a contract between a man and a woman. A Muslim man and woman do not merge their legal identity upon marriage, and do not have rights over any shared marital property. The assets of the man before the marriage, and earned by him after the marriage, remain his during marriage and in case of a divorce, and this ruling is the same for the wife. A divorce under Islamic law does not require redistribution of property. Rather, each spouse walks away from the marriage with his or her individual property. Divorcing Muslim women who did not work outside their home after marriage do not have a claim on the collective wealth of the couple under Islamic law, except for deferred mahr—an amount of money or property the man agrees to pay her before the woman signs the marriage contract. The Quran states:

And for you is half of what your wives leave if they have no child. But if they have a child, for you is one fourth of what they leave, after any bequest they [may have] made or debt. And for the wives is one fourth if you leave no child. But if you leave a child, then for them is an eighth of what you leave, after any bequest you [may have] made or debt. And if a man or woman leaves neither ascendants nor descendants but has a brother or a sister, then for each one of them is a sixth. But if they are more than two, they share a third, after any bequest which was made or debt, as long as there is no detriment [caused]. [This is] an ordinance from Allah, and Allah is Knowing and Forbearing. (Al-Quran 4:12)

In case of husband's death, a portion of his property is inherited by his wives according to a combination of Sharia laws. If the man did not leave any children, his wives receive a quarter of the property and the remaining three-quarters is shared by the blood relatives of the husband (for example, parents, siblings). If he had children from any of his wives, his wives receive an eighth of the property and the rest is for his surviving children and parents. The wives share as inheritance a part of movable property of her late husband, but they do not share anything from immovable property such as land, real estate, farm or such value. A woman's deferred mahr and the dead husband's outstanding debts are paid before any inheritance is applied. Sharia mandates that inheritance include male relatives of the dead person, that a daughter receive half the inheritance as a son, and a widow receives less than her daughters.

=== Divorce ===
In Islam, a woman may only divorce her husband under certain conditions. These are many and include neglect, not being supported financially, the husband's impotence, apostasy, madness, dangerous illness or some other defect in the marriage. Divorce by mutual consent has only to be agreed upon by both parties to become effective. If a Muslim woman wishes to divorce her husband she has two options under Sharia law: seek a tafriq, or seek a khul. A tafriq is a divorce for certain allowable reasons. This divorce is granted by a qadi, a religious judge, in cases where the qadi accepts her claims of abuse or abandonment. If a tafriq is denied by the qadi, she cannot divorce. If a tafriq is granted, the marriage is dissolved and the husband is obligated to pay her the deferred mahr in their marriage contract. The second method, by far more common in wife-initiated divorces, khul is a divorce without cause, by mutual consent. This divorce requires a husband's consent and it must be supported by consideration that passes from the wife to the husband. Often, this consideration almost always consists of the wife relinquishing her claim to the deferred mahr. In actual practice and outside of Islamic judicial theory, a woman's right to divorce is often extremely limited compared with that of men in the Middle East.

In contrast to the comparatively limited methods of divorce available to a woman, Islam allows a Muslim husband to unilaterally divorce his wife, as talaq, with no requirement to show cause; however, in practice there is variance by country as to whether there are any additional legal processes when a husband divorces his wife by this method. For example, the Tunisian Law of Personal Status (1957) makes repudiation by a husband invalid until it has been ratified by a court, and provides for further financial compensation to the wife. Similar laws have been enacted elsewhere, both within an interpretive framework of traditional Sharia law, and through the operation of civil codes not based upon the Sharia. However, upon talaq, the husband must pay the wife her deferred mahr. Some Muslim-majority countries mandate additional financial contributions to be made to the wife on top of the mahr: for example, the Syrian Law of Personal Status (1953) makes the payment of maintenance to the wife by the husband obligatory for one year after the divorce, which is thus a legal recourse of the wife against the husband. The husband is free to marry again immediately after a divorce, but the woman must observe iddah, that is wait for 3 lunar months before she can remarry after divorce, to establish paternity, in case she discovers she is pregnant. In case of death of her husband, the iddah period is 4 lunar months and 10 days before she can start conjugal relations with another Muslim man.

==== Obligations during divorce ====
A verse relating to obligation of women during divorce is 2:228:

Divorced women remain in waiting for three periods, and it is not lawful for them to conceal what Allah has created in their wombs if they believe in Allah and the Last Day. And their husbands have more right to take them back in this [period] if they want reconciliation. And due to the wives is similar to what is expected of them, according to what is reasonable. But the men have a degree over them [in responsibility and authority]. And Allah is Exalted in Might and Wise. (Al-Quran 2:228)

This verse not only explains the divorce rights of women in Islam, it sets out iddah to prevent illegal custody of divorcing husband's child by a woman, specifies that each gender has divorce rights, and that men are a degree above women.

== Religious life ==
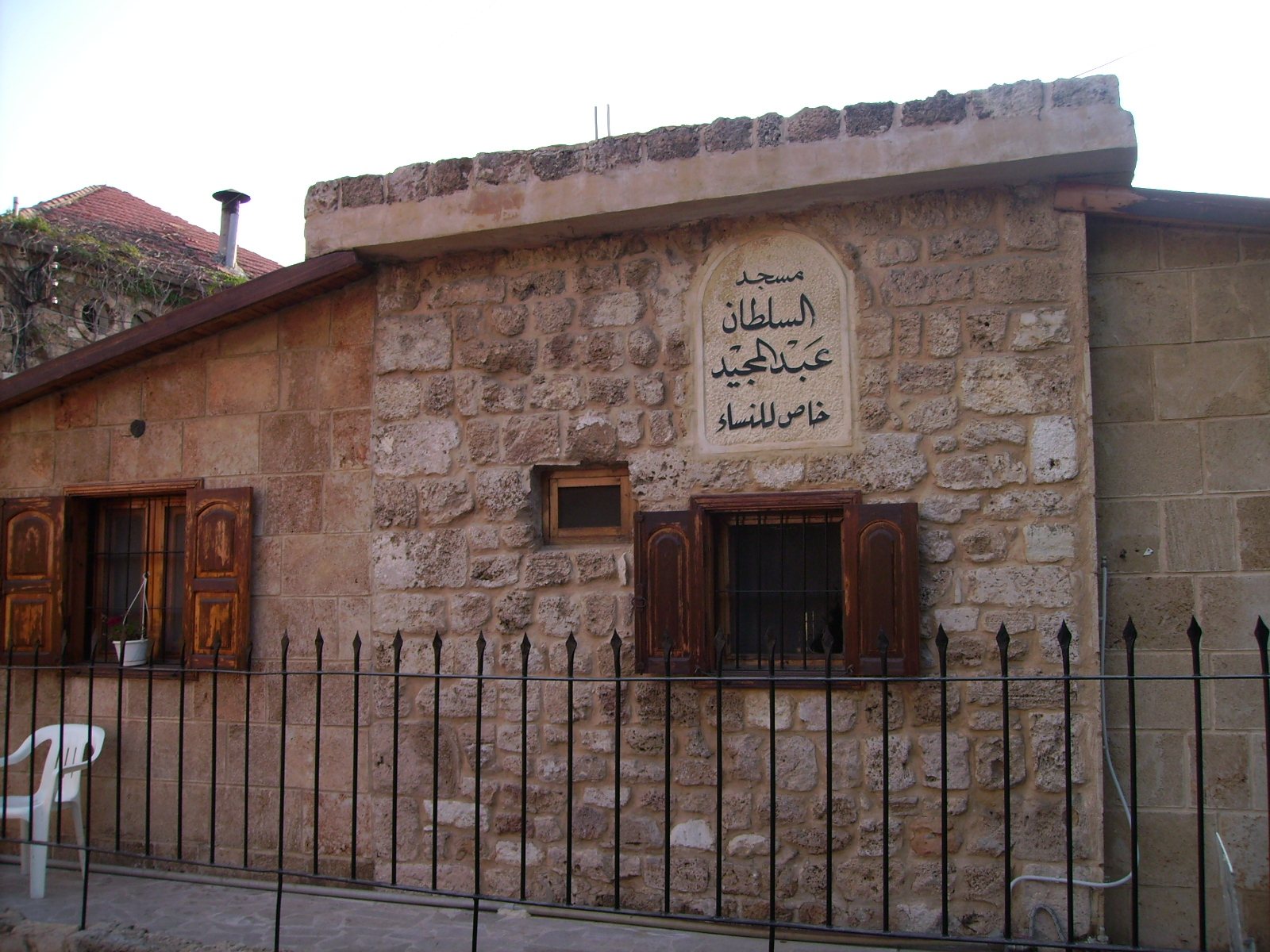
A women-only mosque in Byblos, Lebanon

According to a saying attributed to Muhammad in the hadith Sahih Bukhari, women are allowed to go to mosques. However, as Islam spread, Muslim authorities stressed the fears of unchastity from interaction between sexes outside their home, including the mosque. By pre-modern period it was unusual for women to pray at a mosque. By the late 1960s, women in urban areas of the Middle East increasingly began praying in the mosque, but men and women generally worship separately. (Muslims explain this by citing the need to avoid distraction during prayer prostrations that raise the buttocks while the forehead touches the ground.) Separation between sexes ranges from men and women on opposite sides of an aisle, to men in front of women (as was the case in the time of Muhammad), to women in second-floor balconies or separate rooms accessible by a door for women only. Some scholars believe women in the state of ritual impurity, such as menstruation, are forbidden from entering the prayer hall of the mosque.

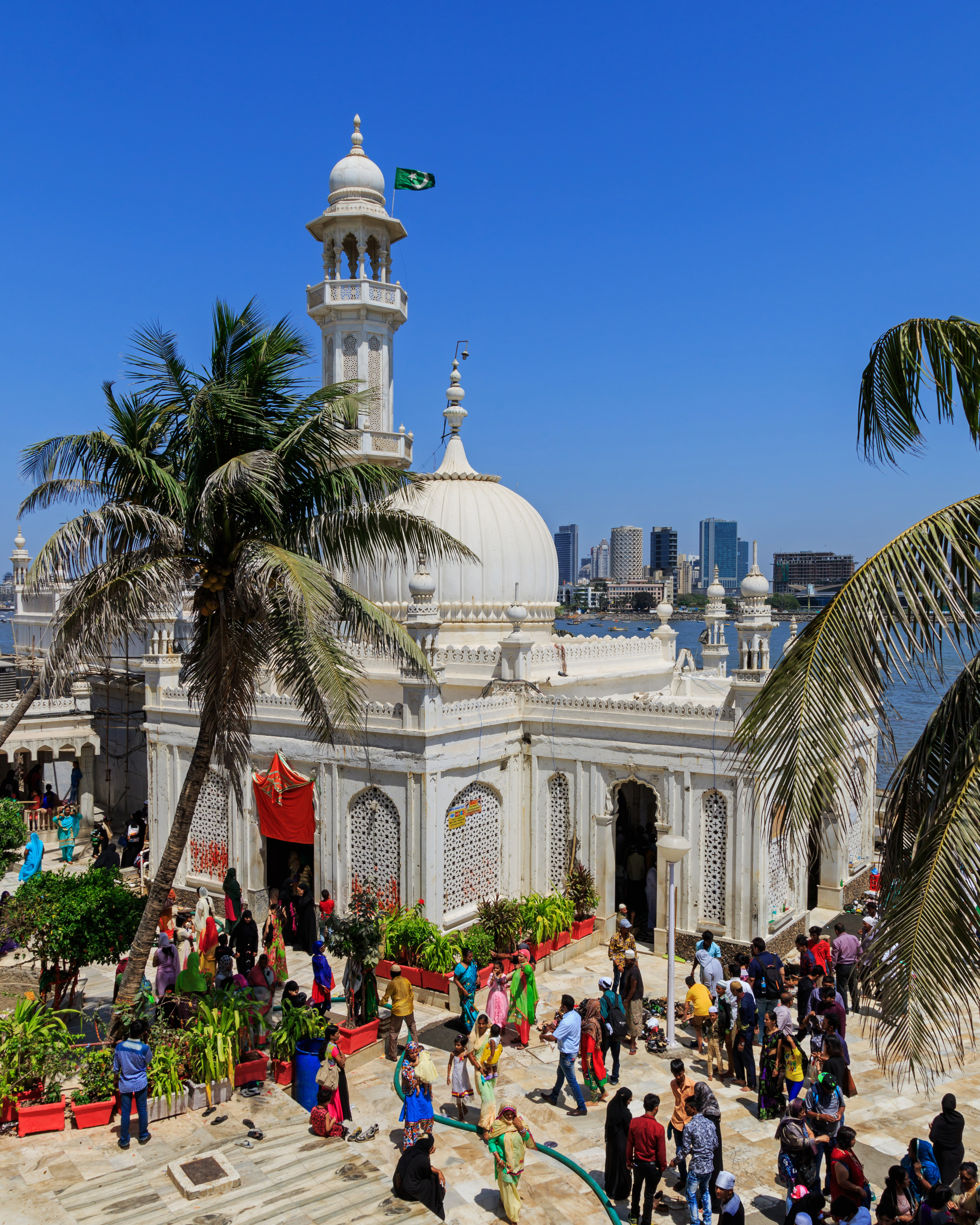
The Haji Ali Dargah in Mumbai, India; entry of women to the sanctum of the shrine was restricted starting 2012 until an intervention by the Bombay High Court in 2016

Today, Muslim women do indeed attend mosques. In fact, in the United States, a recent study by the Institute for Social Policy and Understanding found that American Muslim women attend the mosque at extremely similar rates (35%) to those of American Muslim men (45%). ISPU also found that 87% of Muslim American women say that they "see their faith identity as a source of happiness in their life."

Female religious scholars were relatively common from early Islamic history throughout the 16th century. Mohammad Akram Nadwi, a Sunni religious scholar, has listed 8,000 female jurists, and orientalist Ignaz Goldziher estimates 15 percent of medieval hadith scholars were women. Women, during early history of Islam, primarily obtained their knowledge through community study groups, ribat retreats and during hajj when the usual restrictions imposed on female education were more lenient. After the 16th century, however, female scholars became fewer. In the modern era, while female activists and writers are relatively common, there has not been a significant female jurist in over 200 years. Opportunities for women's religious education exist, but cultural barriers often keep women from pursuing such a vocation.

Women's right to become imams, however, is disputed by many. A fundamental role of an imam (religious leader) in a mosque is to lead the salat (congregational prayers). Generally, women are not allowed to lead mixed prayers. However, some argue that Muhammad gave permission to Umm Waraqa to lead a mixed prayer at the mosque of Dar.

Hui women are self-aware of their relative freedom as Chinese women in contrast to the status of Arab women in countries like Saudi Arabia where Arab women are socially and religiously expected to wear encompassing clothing. Hui women point out these restrictions as "low status", and feel better to be Chinese than to be Arab, claiming that it is Chinese women's advanced knowledge of the Quran which enables them to have equality between men and women.

=== Sufi female mystics ===
Sufi Islam teaches the doctrine of tariqa, meaning following a spiritual path in daily living habits. To support followers of this concept, separate institutions for men (ta'ifa, hizb, rabita) and women (khanqa, rabita, derga) were created. Initiates to these groups pursued a progression of seven stages of spiritual discipline, called makamat (stations) or ahwal (spiritual states).

Rabiah al-Basri is an important figure in Islamic Mysticism called Sufism. She upheld the doctrine of "disinterested love of God".

=== Current female religious scholars ===
There are a number of prominent female Islamic scholars. They generally focus on questioning gender-based interpretations of the Quran, the traditions of Muhammad and early Islamic history. Some notable Muslim women scholars are: Azizah al-Hibri, Amina Wadud, Fatima Mernissi, Riffat Hassan, Laila Ahmad, Amatul Rahman Omar, Farhat Hashmi, Aisha Abdul-Rahman, and Merryl Wyn Davies.

== Notable women in Islam ==
=== Saints, scholars, and spiritual teachers ===
Women have played an integral part in the development and spiritual life of Islam since the inception of Islamic civilisation in the seventh century AD. Khadijah, a businesswoman who became Muhammad's employer and first wife, was also the first Muslim. There have been a few number of female saints in the Islamic world spanning the highest social classes (a famous example being Princess Jahānārā, the daughter of the Moghul emperor Shāh Jahān) and the lowest (such as Lallā Mīmūna in Morocco); some of them, such as Rābi'a of Basra (who is cited reverentially in Muḥammad al-Ghazālī's classic The Revival of Religious Sciences) and Fāṭima of Cordoba (who deeply influenced the young Ibn 'Arabī) have been pivotal to the conceptualisation of Islamic mysticism.

Recognized as one of the most esteemed women in Islamic history, Mary is honored as the mother of Jesus. She is revered in Islam as the only woman named in the Quran, which refers to her seventy times and explicitly identifies her as the greatest woman to have ever lived.

In addition to Khadijah and Maryam, Fatima bint Muhammad holds a revered place in Islamic history. Muhammad is said to have regarded her as the preeminent woman. She is often viewed as an ultimate archetype for Muslim women and an example of compassion, generosity, and enduring suffering. Her name and her epithets remain popular choices for Muslim girls. Iranians celebrate Fatima's birth anniversary on 20 Jumada II as the Mother's Day.

Today, some notable personalities of the Islamic world include the Turkish Sufi teacher Cemalnur Sargut—a disciple of the novelist and mystic Samiha Ayverdi (1905–1993), Amatul Rahman Omar, the first woman to translate the Qur'an into English, and Shaykha Fariha al Jerrahi, the guide of the Nur Ashki Jerrahi Sufi Order.

=== Female converts to Islam ===
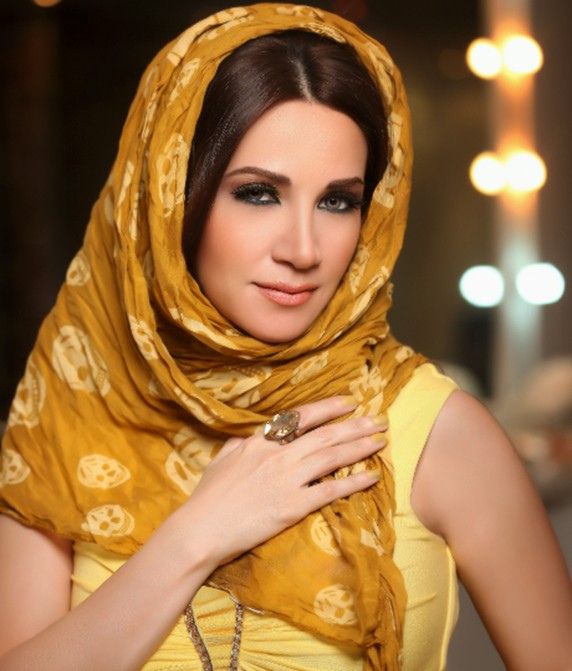
Lebanese-Emirati musician Diana Haddad is one of the Arab world's most popular singers, and an artist who is known for her international collaborations. After studying the religion, Haddad converted to Islam in 1999.

Notable recent female converts to Islam include the German former MTV VJ and author Kristiane Backer, American singer and cultural icon Janet Jackson, Anglo-French writer, broadcaster and academic Myriam François, formerly François-Cerrah, award-winning German actress, model and fashion designer Wilma Elles, Malaysian model Felixia Yeap, Malaysian VJ Marion Caunter, Czech model Markéta Kořínková, Canadian solo motorcycle adventurer Rosie Gabrielle, the Belgian model and former Miss Belgium candidate Lindsey van Gele, the Albanian model Rea Beko, Russian model and former Miss Moscow Oksana Voevodina, the German model Anna-Maria Ferchichi (née Lagerblom), the American supermodel Kendra Spears (Princess Salwa Aga Khan), the Australian model and Miss World Australia finalist Emma Maree Edwards, South African model Wendy Jacobs, and Lithuanian model-turned-actress Karolina 'Kerry' Demirci; the Serbian model and fashion designer Ivana Sert stated her intention to become a Muslim in 2014 after she read the Quran in English. The Turkish actress, author and model (Miss Turkey 2001) Tuğçe Kazaz converted from Islam to Eastern Orthodox Christianity in 2005, and then converted back to Islam in 2008.

Women constitute a significantly larger or growing proportion of individuals who choose to convert to Islam in numerous Western countries. According to researchers based at Swansea University, of the approximately 100,000 people who entered the Muslim faith in the United Kingdom between 2001 and 2011, 75% were women. In the United States, more Hispanic women convert to Islam than Hispanic men, with these women being "mostly educated, young and professional"; the share of overall female converts to Islam in the US rose from 32% in 2000 to 41% in 2011. In Brazil, approximately 70% of converts to Islam are women, most of whom are young and relatively well-educated. Young females constitute an estimated 80% of converts to Islam in Lithuania. According to Susanne Leuenberger of the Institute of Advanced Study in the Humanities and the Social Sciences at the University of Bern, females make up around 60–70% of conversions to Islam in Europe.

In Britain, according to an article in the British Muslims Monthly Survey, the majority of new Muslim converts were women. According to The Huffington Post, "observers estimate that as many as 20,000 Americans convert to Islam annually". Most of them are women and African Americans.

==== Female conversion literature ====
In the twenty-first century, a number of semi-autobiographical books by Western female converts to Islam have enjoyed a measure of mainstream success. These include former MTV and NBC Europe presenter Kristiane Backer's From MTV to Mecca: How Islam Inspired My Life (Arcadia Books, 2012); Spanish journalist Amanda Figueras Fernández's Por qué el islam: Mi vida como mujer, europea y musulmana (Ediciones Península, 2018); and French author Mathilde Loujayne's Big Little Steps: A Woman's Guide to Embracing Islam (Kube Publishing, 2020).

== Comparison with other religions ==
Since its inception in the Arabian Peninsula during the 7th century CE, Islam has had contact and coexistence with other major world religions, and this phenomenon intensified as the religion transcended its Arabian origins to spread over a wide geographical area: from the Adriatic region, where Catholicism and Eastern Orthodox Christianity took root, to the Hinduism- and Buddhism-dominated land masses of India and South-East Asia, Muslim populations have both influenced and been influenced by the pre-existing spiritual traditions that they encountered. Prominent examples of these processes include the syncretist philosophy of dīn-i-ilāhī ("religion of God"), an amalgam of several religions devised by Emperor Akbar (1542–1605) that was practiced at the Mughul Court in India; the crypto-Christianity of Kosovo, a belief system that created a tradition of joint Catholic-Muslim households which persisted into the twentieth century.

When analysing both Islam in general and the topic of women in Islam in particular, the views of scholars and commentators are profoundly shaped by certain cultural lenses. Those coming from a Western background, such as the Switzerland-born writer Charles le Gai Eaton, tend to compare and contrast Islam with Christianity; Eaton concluded that Islam, with certain important qualifications, was "essentially patriarchal". Conversely, those coming from an East Asian background tend to emphasize similarities between Islam and religions such as Taoism, which stress complementarity between the sexes: according to the Japanese scholar Sachiko Murata, it was mandatory for her to use the I Ching as a means of "[conceptualizing] Islamic teachings on the feminine principle without doing violence to the original texts."

The historical strength of various Muslim-led polities—which, unlike other comparable non-Western entities such as China and Japan, were adjacent to "Christian" Europe and/or perceived to be in competition with Western powers—meant that the question of women in Islam has not always been approached objectively by those professing expertise in the subject. This can be viewed as part of the "Orientalist" academic discourse (as defined by Edward Said) that creates a rigid East-West dichotomy in which dynamic and positive values are ascribed to Western civilization; by contrast, "Oriental" societies (including but certainly not limited to Islamic ones) are depicted as being "stationary" and in need of "modernizing" through imperial administrations.

=== Eve's role in the Fall ===
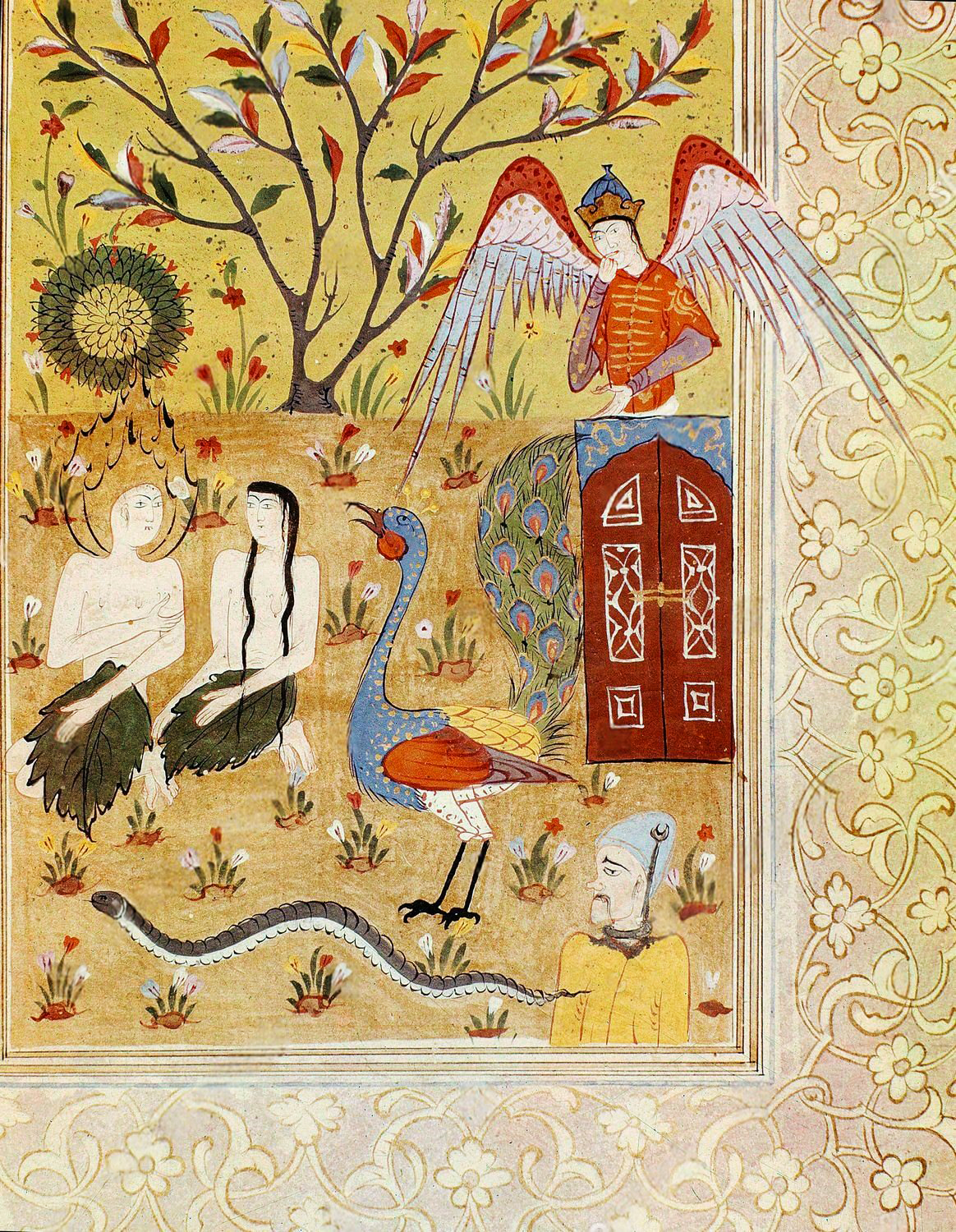
Persian miniature depicting the expulsion of Adam and Eve, observed by the angel Riḍwan, the Serpent, the Peacock, and Iblis

In contrast with the Biblical account of the Fall, in the Islamic tradition Eve (Ḥawwā) did not tempt Adam (Ādam) to eat the forbidden fruit; instead, they were tempted together by the Devil (al-Shayṭān). This means that Eve was not the cause of Adam's expulsion from paradise: he was also responsible, and therefore both men and women are faced equally with its consequences. This has a number of important implications for the Islamic understanding of womanhood and women's roles in both religious and social life. For one, in Islam, women are not seen as a source of evil as a result of the Fall.

Moreover, the Biblical statement that Eve was created from Adam's rib (the famous 'third rib') finds no echo in the Quranic account: both male and female were created 'from one soul' (Sūrah 4:1). Similarly, the concept that (as per Genesis 3:16) the pains of childbirth are a punishment for Eve's sin is alien to the Quran.

=== The Virgin Mary ===
The Virgin Mary (Maryām) is considered by the Quran to hold the most exalted spiritual position amongst women. A chapter of the Quran (Sūrat Maryam, the nineteenth sura) is named after her, and she is the only woman mentioned by name in the Quran; Maryām is mentioned more times in the Quran than in the New Testament. Furthermore, the miraculous birth of Christ from a virgin mother is recognised in the Quran.

=== Polygamy ===
Polygamy is not exclusive to Islam; the Old Testament describes numerous examples of polygamy among devotees to God and historically, some Christian groups have practiced and continue to practice polygamy.

The Rig Veda mentions that during the Vedic period, a man could have more than one wife. The practice is attested in epics like Ramayana and Mahabharata. The Dharmashastras permit a man to marry women provided that the first wife agree to marry him. Despite its existence, it was most usually practiced by men of higher status. Traditional Hindu law allowed polygamy if the first wife could not bear a child.

In traditionally multi-confessional India, polygamy is actually more widespread amongst other religious communities: the 1961 census found that the incidence of polygamy was the least amongst Muslims (5.7%), with Hindus (5.8%), Jains (6.7%), Buddhists (7.9%) and Adivasis (15.25%) all more likely to have at least two wives. Similarly, India's third National Family Health Survey (2006) found that a number of socioeconomic reasons were more likely to explain the prevalence of polygamy than the religion of the parties involved. This survey also found that a polygamous Hindu was likely to have (as a statistical average) 1.77 wives; a Christian, 2.35; a Muslim, 2.55; and a Buddhist, 3.41.

== Shrines and mosques ==
From the earliest centuries of Islam, Muslims have visited shrines and mosques to pray, meditate, ask forgiveness, seek cures for ailments, and seek grace—a blessing or spiritual influence (barakah) sent down by God. Some of these structures are named after women. Although women are not restricted from entering mosques, it is quite uncommon to see women gathering in mosques to pray. When women do travel to mosques, they are usually accompanied by their husband or other women at times of the day where there is not a large population of other men. While prayer is mostly done at home for women, when they are attending prayers at public worship places such as a mosque, they are to be separated from the other men present. Women must also be dressed appropriately or they may be reprimanded.

=== The Virgin Mary ===
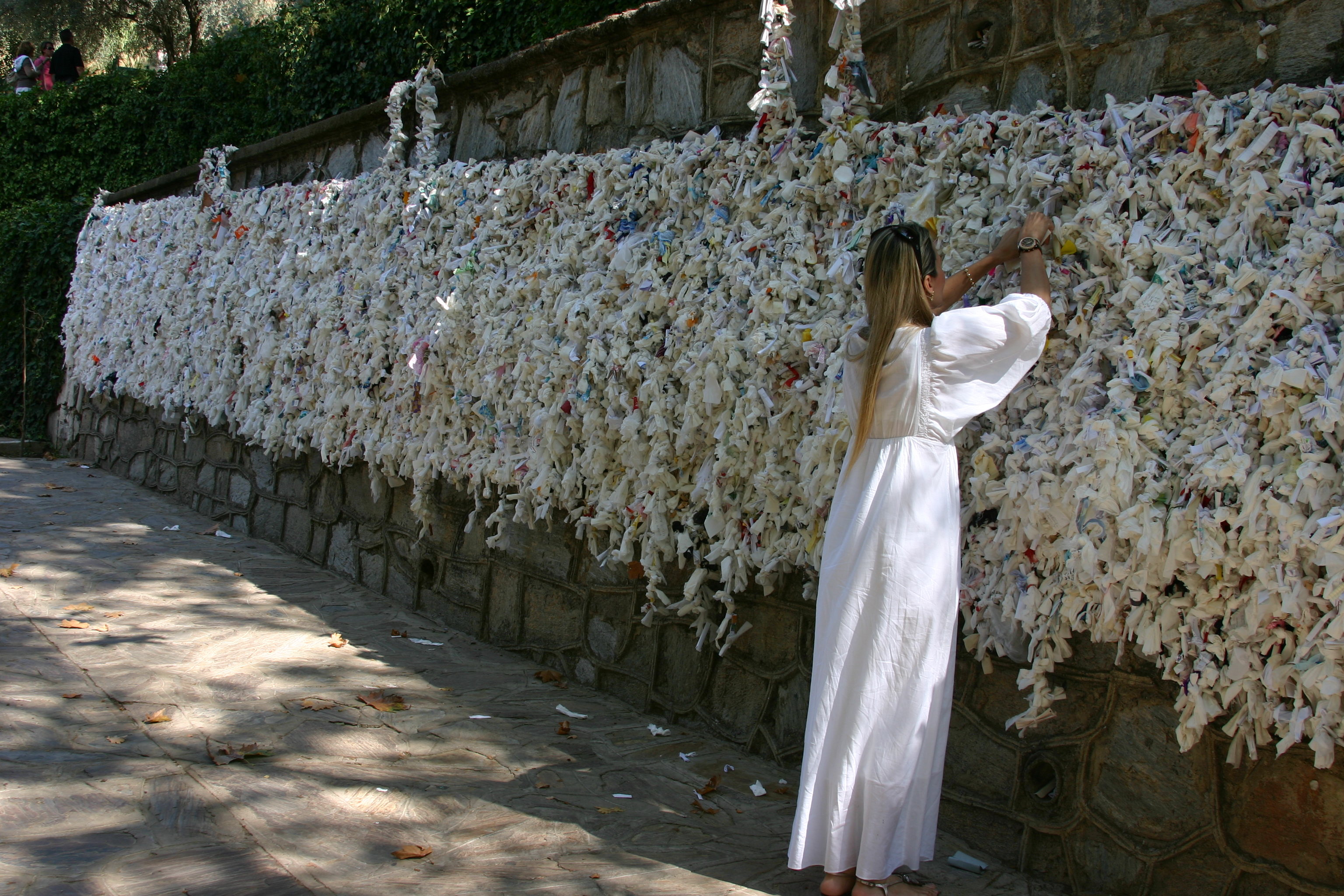
The Meryemana or wishing wall at the House of the Virgin Mary in Ephesus, Turkey. Pilgrims' most frequent wishes include those for good health, peace and happiness. This devotional site is one of many that is sacred to both Christians and Muslims.

The Virgin Mary ('Maryam' in Arabic) has a particularly exalted position within the Islamic tradition, extolled as she is for being the mother of Jesus, whom Muslims revere as a prophet. Maryam is the only woman mentioned by name in Islam's sacred text; an entire chapter or sūra of the Quran—the nineteenth, Sūrat Maryam—bears her name.

Accordingly, the Virgin Mary is synonymous with numerous holy sites in the Islamic faith:

1. The House of the Virgin Mary near Selçuk, Turkey. This is a shrine frequented by both Christians and Muslims. It is known as Panaya Kapulu ("the Doorway to the Virgin") in Turkish. Pilgrims drink water from a spring under her house which is believed to have healing properties. Perhaps the shrine's most distinctive feature is the Mereyemana or wishing wall on which visitors attach their written wishes; because the House of the Virgin Mary is increasingly famous internationally, these messages are composed in English, Italian, Japanese, Chinese, French and Spanish, as well as Turkish.
2. The Virgin Mary Monastery in the province of Giresun, Turkey. This is one of the oldest monasteries in the area and has been active since the fourth century A.D.
3. The Virgin Mary Mosque in Tartous, Syria. This was officially inaugurated in June 2015 as a symbol of peace and religious tolerance. Antoine Deeb—the representative of the Tartous and Lattakia Patriarchate—stated that naming the mosque after the Virgin Mary 'shows that Islam and Christianity share the messages of peace and love.'
4. The Virgin Mary Mosque in Melbourne, Australia.
5. Medjugorje, Bosnia and Herzegovina. This site is associated with a number of Marian apparitions forecast by a Muslim mystic by the name of Hasan Shushud that were reported in the late twentieth century by local Catholics.
6. The Chapel of Santa Cruz at Oran, Algeria. The chapel's tower contains a large statue of the Virgin Mary, which is styled as Notre Dame du Salut de Santa Cruz. The historian James McDougall notes in his acclaimed A History of Algeria (2017) that to this day, the women of Oran "still climb up to the church the [French] settlers built...in 1959, at Santa Cruz, to light candles to lalla Maryam, the Virgin whose statue still looks benignly over their city from the mountaintop."

=== Hala Sultan ===
Hala Sultan Tekke, Larnaca, Cyprus is an ancient site revered because it contains the burial place of Muḥammad's paternal aunt Hala Sultan (Umm Haram in Arabic), although other scholars believe that she was in fact Muḥammad's wet nurse.

According to legend, Hala Sultan died after falling off her mule and breaking her neck during the first Arab incursions into Cyprus around 647 A.D. The same night, a divine power supposedly placed three giant stones where she lay. In 1760, Hala Sultan's grave was discovered by Sheikh Hasan; he began spreading the word about her healing powers, and a tomb was built there. The complex—comprising a mosque, mausoleum, minaret, cemetery and living quarters for men and women—was constructed in its present form while the island was still under Ottoman rule, and completed in around 1816.

According to the archaeologist Tuncer Bağışkan, during the Ottoman period in Cyprus, Ottoman-flagged ships used to fly their flags at half-mast when off the shores of Larnaca, and salute Hala Sultan with cannon shots.

This tekke is also notable for being the burial place of the grandmother of the late King Hussein of Jordan.

=== Sayeda Zainab ===
The granddaughter of Muḥammad is the patron saint of Cairo, the Arab world's largest city and a regional cultural hub. She also has the following mosques named for her:

1. The Sayeda Zainab mosque in Cairo, Egypt. The original structure was built in 1549; the modern mosque dates back to 1884. In 1898, the square in front of the mosque also took her name. The mosque was expanded in 1942 and renovated in 1999 following an earthquake seven years earlier. There is an annual feast dedicated to Sayeda Zainab which celebrates her birth; the celebration features ecstatic mystical whirling inside the shrine, while outside there are fairground attractions such as merry-go-round rides. Historically, the coffee shops around the square and the mosque were places where some of Egypt's most notable writers and journalists met and exchanged ideas. There is a notable silver shrine inside the mosque. According to Sunni Muslim tradition, this mosque houses the tomb of Sayeda Zainab.
2. The Sayyidah Zaynab Mosque in the city of Sayeda Zainab, a southern suburb of Damascus, Syria. According to Shia Muslim tradition, it is in fact this mosque which contains the tomb of Muḥammad's granddaughter. It has been a destination of mass pilgrimage for Muslims since the 1980s. The dome is gold-leafed.

=== Fātimah al-Ma'sūmah ===
Fātimah al-Ma'sūmah was the sister of the eighth Imam and the daughter of the seventh Imam in 'Twelver' Shī'ism. Her shrine is located in Qom, a city which is one of the most important Shī'ah centres of theology. During the Safavid dynasty, the women of this family were very active in embellishing the Shrine of Fatima Masumeh. In times of war, Safavid royal women found refuge in Qom, and likely compared their situation to that of Fatima Masumeh.

=== Rabi'āh al-'Adawiyyah ===
One of the most famous saints in Islam, Rabi'āh al-'Adawiyyah ('Rabi'āh') extolled the way of maḥabbah ('divine love') and uns ('Intimacy with God'). Her mystical sayings are noted for their pith and clarity; some have become proverbs throughout the Islamic world. The famous mosque in Cairo, which is named in Rabi'āh's honour, is notable for being the burial site of former Egyptian president Anwar Sadat. The mosque was badly damaged during the 2013 post-military coup unrest in Egypt. It has since been rebuilt.

=== Ruqayyah bint Ali ===
Ruqayyah bint Ali was the daughter-in-law of Muḥammad's cousin and son-in-law 'Alī ibn Abī Ṭālib. Legend has it that the Bibi Pak Daman (lit. 'the chaste lady') mausoleum—located in Lahore, Pakistan—named after her contains not just her grave but those of five other ladies from Muḥammad's household. These females were amongst the most important women who brought Islam to South Asia. It is said that these ladies came here after the event of the battle of Karbala on the 10th day of the month of Muharram in 61 AH (October 10, CE 680). Bibi Pak Daman is the collective name of the six ladies believed to interred at this mausoleum, though it is also (mistakenly) popularly used to refer to the personage of Ruqayyah bint Ali alone. They preached and engaged in missionary activity in the environs of Lahore. It is said that Data Ganj Bakhsh, considered a great Sufi saint of the South Asia, was himself a devotee of the Bibi Pak Daman shrine and received holy knowledge from this auspicious shrine.

== See also ==
- Cairo Declaration on Human Rights in Islam
- Mary in Islam
- Concubinage#Muslim world
- Concubinage in Islam
- Gendered Islamophobia
- History of Concubinage in the Muslim world
- Female figures in the Quran
- Female political leaders in Islam and in Muslim-majority countries
- Gender roles in Islam
- Houri
- Islam and humanity
- Islamic feminism
- Islamic schools and branches
- Islamic sexual jurisprudence
- Muslim women in sport
- Muhammad's wives
- Muslim women in science and technology
- Sex segregation and Islam
- Sharia#Women
- Haya (Islam)
- Timeline of first women's suffrage in majority-Muslim countries
- Women in Arab societies
- World Hijab Day
- Women as imams
- Women in the Quran
- Zenana
- Mahr
