= Yasir Nadeem al Wajidi =

Chicago-based mufti

Mufti, Doctor مفتی، ڈاکٹر Yasir Nadeem al Wajidi یاسر ندیم الواجدی
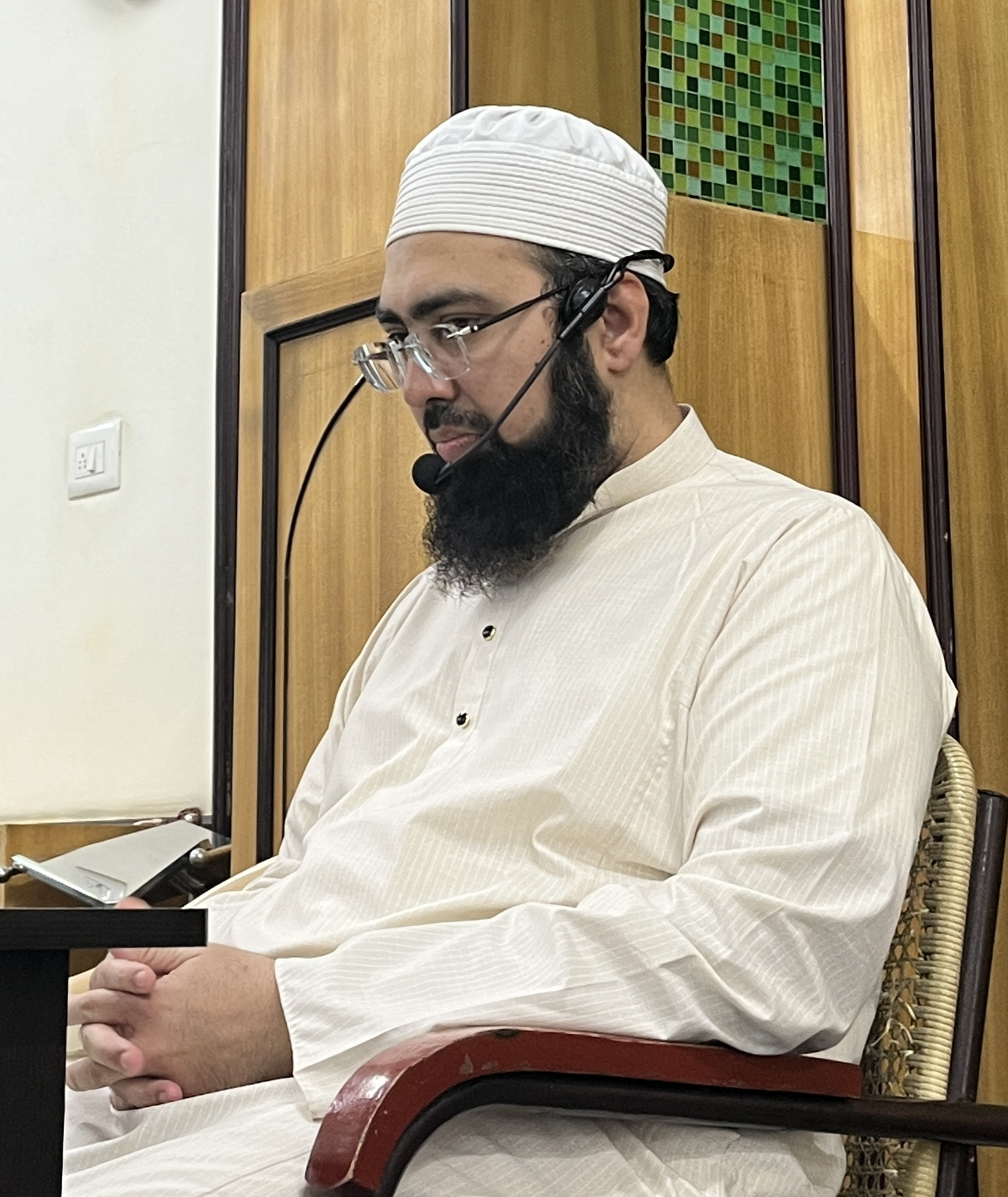
- Yasir at Masjid-e-Mamoor in Bengaluru
- Title: Mufti, Professor, Doctor

Personal life
- Born: 4 March 1982 (age 44) Deoband, Uttar Pradesh, India
- Parent: Nadeem al-Wajidi (father)
- Notable work(s): Islam and Globalization
- Education: Darul Uloom Deoband American Open University M.A PhD. International Islamic University Malaysia
- Relatives: Usmani family of Deoband (maternal), Sharif Hasan Deobandi (great paternal uncle)
- Website: yasirnadeemalwajidi.com

Religious life
- Religion: Islam
- Denomination: Sunni
- Founder of: Burhan Academy
- Jurisprudence: Hanafi
- Movement: Deobandi
- Profession: Islamic scholar, professor, author, public speaker

Muslim leader
- Teacher: Naseer Ahmad Khan; Saeed Ahmad Palanpuri; Nematullah Azami
- Students: Shamail Nadwi

YouTube information
- Channel: Yasir Nadeem al Wajidi
- Years active: 2010–present
- Genre: Islamic
- Subscribers: 381 thousand
- Views: 50 million
- Last updated: 27 October 2025

Yasir Nadeem al Wajidi (born 4 March 1982) is a Chicago-based Muslim scholar, mufti, author, public speaker, and debater. He is the founder and president of Burhan Academy, an Islamic school located at the former Elgin Academy site in Elgin, Illinois. He is a mufti and teaches fiqh, hadith, and aqidah at the Islamic Institute of Education in Chicago. He is the founder of Darul Uloom Online and the author of books including Historical Study on Islamic Renewal and Islam and Globalization.

== Early life and education ==
Yasir Nadeem al Wajidi was born on 4 March 1982 in Deoband in India's Uttar Pradesh state. His father, Nadeem al-Wajidi, was a well-known Islamic scholar and writer. His grandfather Wajid Hussain Deobandi was a hadith professor at the Jamia Islamia Talimuddin. Yasir is maternally related to the Usmani family of Deoband. His maternal grandfather, Abdullah Saleem had established Mahd Taleemul Islām, the first madrasa in Chicago.

Yasir memorized the Quran with his parents and entered the Darul Uloom Deoband for further education. He graduated in 2001 and then specialized in Arabic literature and Islamic jurisprudence. His teachers include Naseer Ahmad Khan, Nematullah Azami, and Saeed Ahmad Palanpuri. In 2004, Yasir moved to the United States of America and earned an M.A. in Arabic literature from the American Open University. He did his doctoral studies in hadith at the International Islamic University Malaysia in 2012 under the supervision of Abul Lais Khairabadi.

== Career ==
Yasir began teaching at the Mahd Taleemul Islām in 2004 and established Darul Uloom Online in 2009. Darul Uloom Online is thought to be first initiative towards the teaching of dars-e-nizami curriculum online. He is the deputy chairman of Islamic Literature Review, an international journal on Islamic revival. He also serves as the Vice President of the Association of Muslim Scholars in Chicago. He is the founder and president at Burhan Academy, an Islamic school located at the former Elgin Academy site in Elgin, Illinois. His students include Shamail Nadwi.

== Media presence and statements ==
In February 2017, Nadeem challenged the Pakistani-Canadian author Tarek Fateh, who hosts Fatah Ka Fatwa, that, "If Fateh really liked to debate Islam then he should debate with Yasir anywhere in the world, owing to conditions including the presence of independent judges and at a public place not in a TV studio". Yasir had also expressed that, "questions and allegations will be of Fateh whilst the responses would be of Yasir". Fateh, however did not accept Yasir's offer of an academic debate. Following the inception of Fateh's Fatah Ka Fatwa, Yasir started Surgical Strike, a talk show to counter allegations made against Islam. The talk show released 72 episodes including the major ones with Arif Mohammad Khan, Mahmood Madani, Orya Maqbool Jan, Ram Puniyani and Ravi Shankar, and discontinued after two successful years.

In May 2017, Yasir said about Muslim girls who elope with Hindu boys and leave Islam, that, "No one is responsible for such cases of apostasies more than the religious scholars who establish institutions for those who come to them to learn Islam but they ignore rest of the 97% young boys and girls who do not go to any madrasas". In January 2019, Yasir hit a controversy saying that the Jana Gana Mana had no concepts of polytheism associated, as is generally believed by many Muslims. He expressed that Rabindranath Tagore had written the poem in the praise of God. He said that if Tagore was a polytheist, it was understandable that the poem is influenced by polytheism, but there is no such proof which brands Tagore as a polytheist. He cited John B. Watson stating that Tagore's religion was God and love with the nature. In March 2021, Yasir denounced presence of casteism in Indian Muslims and said that it is a social evil.

In February 2023, Yasir hit another controversy after he called the marriage of Swara Bhasker and Fahad Ahmad "legal but not accepted in Islam". This created a Twitter war between him and RJ Sayema, and made critics call his take misogynistic.

In a discussion on casteism, Yasir clarified that caste-based discrimination has no basis in Islam and is purely a social issue. He emphasized that Islam promotes equality, citing the Qur'an (Surah Al-Hujurat 49:13) and Muhammad's last sermon, both of which stress that all humans are equal and that piety is the only measure of superiority in the eyes of Allah.

In June 2023, in response to the release of the Hindi language movie 72 Hoorain, Yasir released a video on Twitter addressing misconceptions about Muslims and terrorism. He challenged the notion that global terrorism is driven by the promise of "72 Hoorain", emphasizing that such incidents constitute only a small fraction of global violence. He argued that while extremist groups like ISIS and Al-Qaeda are universally condemned by Muslims as terrorists, other violent mobs, especially those targeting Muslims, are often not labeled as terrorists.

== Literary works ==
Yasir compiled Qāmus al-Asri, a trilingual dictionary which contains seventy-five thousand words of Arabic, English and Urdu language. His other works include:

- Islam and Globalization
- Tajdīd-i dīn: sharī'at aur tārīk̲h̲ kī raushnī men̲ (Historical study on Islamic renewal)
