= Gifford House =

Gifford House or Gifford Farm may refer to:

in the United States (by state)

- Darden-Gifford House Rosebud, Arkansas, listed on the NRHP in White County, Arkansas
- Gifford-Davidson House, Elgin, Illinois, NRHP-listed
- Gifford Farm (Barnstable, Massachusetts), NRHP-listed
- Gifford House (Bozeman, Montana), listed on the NRHP in Gallatin County, Montana
- Gifford-Walker Farm, North Bergen, New York, NRHP-listed
- Dr. William Gifford House, Cleveland, Ohio, NRHP-listed
- George C. and Annie Gifford House, Wharton, Texas, listed on the NRHP in Wharton County, Texas
- Gifford House (Milton, Wisconsin), listed on the NRHP in Rock County, Wisconsin
