= Nadeem al-Wajidi =

Indian Islamic scholar (1954–2024)

Maulana Nadeem al-Wajidi مولانا ندیم الواجدی

Personal life
- Born: Wasif Husain; 23 July 1954 Deoband, Saharanpur, Uttar Pradesh, India
- Died: 14 October 2024 (aged 70) Chicago, Illinois, US
- Resting place: Chicago
- Children: Yasir Nadeem al Wajidi
- Parent: Wajid Husain Deobandi (father)
- Main interest(s): Urdu Literature, Arabic Literature
- Notable work(s): Ihyaul Uloom (Urdu translation), Al-Qamoos al-Maudoo'ī (dictionary), Naye Zehen Ke Shubhāt aur Islam Ka Mauqif
- Education: Miftahul Uloom Jalalabad, Darul Uloom Deoband
- Pen name: Nadeem al-Wajidi
- Occupation: Columnist, writer

Religious life
- Religion: Islam
- Denomination: Sunni
- Jurisprudence: Hanafi
- Movement: Deobandi

Muslim leader
- Teacher: Wajid Husain Deobandi (father); Ahmad Hasan Deobandi (grandfather); Masihullah Khan; Sharif Hasan Deobandi (maternal uncle); Wahiduzzaman Kairanawi

Wasif Husain Nadeem al-Wajidi (also spelled Maulana Nadeem-Ul-Wajidi; 23 July 1954 – 14 October 2024) was an Indian Islamic scholar, columnist, critic, and writer who specialized in Urdu and Arabic language and literature. He was Editor-in-chief of the monthly Tarjumān-e-Deoband. He was the father of Yasir Nadeem al-Wajidi.

== Early life and education ==
Wasif Husain Nadeem al-Wajidi was born in Deoband on 23 July 1954. His birth name, Wasif Husain, was given by Hussain Ahmad Madani.

His family has a strong literary background and settled in Deoband from Bijnor about a century and a half ago. His grandfather, Ahmad Hasan Deobandi, was the Sheikh al-Hadith of Jamia Miftahul Uloom in Jalalabad, and his father, Wajid Husain Deobandi, was the Sheikh al-Hadith of Jamia Islamia Talimuddin in Dabhel. His maternal uncle, Sharif Hasan Deobandi, was the Sheikh al-Hadith of Darul Uloom Deoband.

He received his primary education in Deoband and then studied at Madrasa Miftahul Uloom in Jalalabad, where he benefitted academically from Masihullah Khan Sherwani.

In 1967, he enrolled in Darul Uloom Deoband, graduating in 1974 (1393 AH). After graduation, he pursued further studies in Arabic language and literature for two more years in the departments of completion of Arabic literature and specialization in Arabic literature at Darul Uloom.

He was one of the notable students of Wahiduzzaman Kairanawi. Kairanawi appointed him as the representative of Darul Uloom's Arabic student club, An-Nadi al-Adabi. During that time, he also published a wall magazine called Ash-Shu'oor from the same club.

== Career ==
After graduation, Nadeem al-Wajidi taught for one year at Darul Uloom Rahnania in Hyderabad, under the guidance of his teachers Sharif Hasan Deobandi, Naseer Ahmad Khan, and Muhammad Naeem Deobandi. In 1978, the advisory council of Darul Uloom Deoband appointed him as the supervisor of the writing and compilation department for its centenary celebration, where he worked for two years, publishing various books and magazines in Arabic and Urdu. In the same year, he founded the Arabic Teaching Center in Deoband, from which thousands of students benefited over the years. Seven books were published by this center and were included in the curricula of several madrasas.

In 1980, after the centenary celebration of Darul Uloom Deoband, he established a publishing house called Darul Kitab in Deoband. Between 1980 and 1987, he translated Al-Ghazali's renowned book Ihyā-ul-Uloom in installments, which was published in four volumes in Lahore and Karachi in Pakistan, and Dhaka in Bangladesh. From this publishing house, he also published numerous books on academic and non-curricular subjects, with some distributed internationally in countries such as Lebanon and Egypt. Today, this publishing house is well-known across the subcontinent.

In 2001, he established the first residential educational institution for girls in Deoband, named Ma'had Ayesha As-Sadiqah, in an effort to address the deterioration of Muslim society, especially among women, under the guise of women's freedom. He appointed his wife, herself an Islamic scholar, as the manager of internal affairs.

He served as the Uttar Pradesh President of the All India Tanzeem-e-Ulama-e-Hind and was a General Member of the All India Muslim Personal Law Board, among other posts.

In the short film Mister Come Tomorrow, the concept of halala is portrayed with common misconceptions, showing that a woman is asked to sleep with another man besides her husband. Nadeem al-Wajidi criticized this portrayal, stating that the true meaning of halala has been misunderstood. He clarified that halala is actually intended to assist a divorced woman, giving her the right to remarry any man, not necessarily her former husband.

== Literary works ==
Nadeem al-Wajidi started writing essays during his student days, and he was encouraged in his writing by the fortnightly Urdu magazine Makarz of Deoband. He also served as the editor of the wall magazine Shu'oor during his student life. From that time until 2013, about 400 of his articles had been published in reputable newspapers and magazines in the country and abroad, and thirteen collections of his articles had been published by 2013. His articles were often published in the magazines Darul Uloom, Naya Daur Lucknow, Aaj Kal, Rashtriya Sahara, Daily Sahafat, Sada-e-Dawat, etc. He was one of the prominent Indian literati in Arabic. He was a renowned researcher with a pen-and-style personality.

In 2000, he had published a monthly magazine called Tarjuman-e-Deoband, which continued to be published and remained popular and well known among scholars in the country and abroad, along with the writings of prestigious writers from both within the country and abroad.

Nadeem al-Wajidi authored nearly fifty books, including:

- Ihyaul Uloom (Urdu translation of Al-Ghazali's Iḥyāʾ ʿUlūm al-Dīn in four volumes)
- Al-Qamoos al-Maudoo'ī (a trilingual dictionary in Arabic, English, and Urdu)
- Jam'-ul-Khasāil (an Urdu commentary on Al-Tirmidhi's Shama'il)
- Islam; Haqāiq aur Ghalat-fehmiyān (Islam; Facts and Misconceptions)
- Insāni Masāil; Islami Tanāzur Mein (human problems in the Islamic context)
- Teen Talāq Awām Ki Adālat Mein (Triple Talaq in the Court of Public Opinion)
- Musalmānon-Ki Milli aur Siyāsi Zindagi (Social and Political Life of Muslims)
- Naye Zehen Ke Shubhāt aur Islam Ka Mauqif (Doubts of the Modern Mind and Islam's Perspective)
- Humāre Madāris: Mizāj aur Minhāj (Our Islamic seminaries: Mood and Mindfulness)
- Ramadan Kaise Guzārein (How to Spend Ramadan? in Urdu and Hindi)
- Ramadan; Naikiyon Ka Mausam-e-Bahār (Ramadan is the spring of goodness)
- Qiyāmat Ki Nishāniyan aur Maulana Wahīduddīn Khān Ke Nazriyyāt (Doomsday signs and theories of Wahiduddin Khan)

== Death ==
Nadeem al-Wajidi died in Chicago, United States, on 14 October 2024, at the age of 70. The following day, his funeral prayer was held in the same city, and he was buried there.
