= Kartavya =

Kartavya may refer to:

- Kartavya (organization), a national non-governmental organization in India
- Kartavya (1979 film), 1979 Indian action drama film
- Kartavya (1985 film), 1985 Indian film
- Kartavya (1995 film), 1995 Indian film
- Kartavya (2026 film), 2026 Indian film

== See also ==
- Karthavyam (disambiguation)
- Kartavya Path, formerly King's Way and Rajpath, a boulevard in New Delhi
- Kartabya, an Indian film
