= Elgin Academy =

Elgin Academy may refer to:

- Elgin Academy, Moray, Elgin, Scotland, a high school
- Elgin Academy (Elgin, Illinois), United States, an independent, coeducational, college-preparatory school
