= Shamail Nadwi =

Indian Islamic scholar (born 1998)

Mufti Shamail Nadwi
- Born: Shamail Ahmad Abdullah; June 7, 1998 (age 28); Srinagar, Jammu and Kashmir, India
- Education: Darul Uloom Nadwatul Ulama; International Islamic University Malaysia
- Organizations: Markaz al-Wahyain; Wahyain Foundation
- Known for: Debate with Javed Akhtar on the existence of God
- Notable work: Masʾala-e-Ghulāmī aur Islām (transl. The Issue of Slavery and Islam)

Personal life
- Home town: Kolkata, West Bengal, India

Religious life
- Religion: Islam
- Denomination: Sunni
- Founder of: Markaz al-Wahyain; Wahyain Foundation
- Jurisprudence: Hanafi
- Movement: Deobandi, Nadwi
- Website: https://muftishamail.com/

Shamail Ahmad Abdullah Nadwi (born 7 June 1998) is an Indian Islamic scholar, mufti, and author. In 2025, he live streamed an academic debate titled An Academic Dialogue: Does God Exist? with poet and lyricist Javed Akhtar at the Constitution Club of India in New Delhi which quickly became a viral video.

== Early life and education ==
Shamail Nadwi was born on 7 June 1998 in Srinagar, Jammu and Kashmir, India. Although born in Srinagar, he was raised primarily in Kolkata, where most of his early education and upbringing took place. His family background includes maternal roots in Baramulla, Jammu and Kashmir with paternal roots in Kolkata, where he continues to reside.

Alongside formal schooling, Nadwi is reported to have memorised the Qur’an at a young age, completing hifz (memorisation of the Quran) during his early teens. His early religious education took place largely at home under the guidance of scholars including Ibtida Alam Nadwi and Nadeem Nadwi. He completed schooling up to the eighth grade at an English-medium school in Kolkata and later passed his matriculation through open schooling.

In 2015, Nadwi enrolled at Darul Uloom Nadwatul Ulama in Lucknow, an Islamic seminary in India. He completed the Alimiyyah programme in 2017. Between 2018 and 2019, he undertook specialisation in Qur'anic exegesis (tafsir) and Qur’anic sciences, followed by formal training in ifta from 2019 to 2020.

From 2020 to 2022, Nadwi undertook a two-year programme titled Tahafut al-Malahidah, which examined Western philosophical thought and contemporary critiques of religion. The programme was conducted under the supervision of Yasir Nadeem al Wajidi and involved philosophical and theological study alongside classical Islamic scholarship.

After completing his formal Islamic education in India, Nadwi pursued higher studies at the International Islamic University Malaysia, where he has been enrolled in doctoral research in Islamic Revealed Knowledge and Human Sciences as of 2025, with completion expected later in the decade.

== Career ==
Nadwi is engaged in religious instruction and educational outreach. In 2021, he founded Markaz al-Wahyain, an online platform that offers courses in Qur'anic studies, hadith, Islamic jurisprudence, and related subjects. The initiative offers structured religious education programmes for adult learners.

In 2024, he established the Wahyain Foundation, a non-profit organisation based in Kolkata. According to media reports, the foundation focuses on educational activities and addresses questions related to religion and atheism through organised programmes. An Urdu-language profile published by Hira Online reports that the foundation's educational programmes include study modules addressing contemporary atheistic thought (mutālaʿa-yi ilḥād-i jadīd).

He has served as a khatib at the Kobi Bagan Mosque in Kolkata, where he delivered sermons and conducted Qur'anic tafsir sessions.

He maintains an active presence on YouTube, Instagram, and Facebook, where he discusses religious, ethical, and philosophical topics. News coverage following the December 2025 debate noted that his online content received increased public attention, particularly in relation to discussions on atheism and contemporary religious questions.

== Public debate with Javed Akhtar ==
Nadwi and Yasir Nadeem following Nadwi's debate with Javed Akhtar in 2025

In August 2025, Several Muslim organisations, including the Jamiat Ulema-e-Hind, objected to an invitation extended to Javed Akhtar for a literary programme organised by the West Bengal Urdu Academy, linking the objections to Akhtar's publicly stated atheistic views and remarks perceived as critical of religion. Media reports also noted that the Wahyahin Foundation, led by Nadwi, publicly invited Akhtar to participate in a debate on the existence of God. Nadwi was also reported as stating that the Foundation had not issued threats and had expressed its position through an invitation to debate.

In December 2025, Nadwi took part in a nearly two-hour public debate called Does God Exist?, moderated by journalist Saurabh Dwivedi and held at the Constitution Club of India, New Delhi. The debate featured Nadwi and poet–lyricist Akhtar. The debate was broadcast on YouTube, quickly becoming a viral video accumulating more than 1.5 million views within six hours of release.

Media coverage in outlets such as BBC Urdu and Deccan Chronicle described the exchange as an academic dialogue centred on philosophical questions concerning metaphysics, morality, free will, and human suffering. During the debate, Nadwi argued that the question of God's existence is metaphysical rather than scientific, emphasising moral responsibility, free will, and the limits of empirical reasoning. Akhtar, approaching the issue from an atheist perspective, questioned the idea of divine justice in light of human suffering, particularly the deaths of children in conflict zones.

Nadwi stated in an interview that he had received messages from young people and non-Muslims following the debate, describing renewed interest in religious questions. He added that while some individuals reported personal changes in belief, no official data was available to substantiate broader claims.

Writing in The Indian Express, political theorist Yogendra Yadav argued that framing the exchange primarily as a debate on the existence of God risked shifting attention away from other questions he considered more pressing in contemporary India, such as the declining intellectual and moral quality of religious leadership and the increasing entanglement of religion with political power. While expressing respect for the debate's civility and its wide public interest, he characterised such discussions as less relevant to the broader challenges facing religion and religiosity today.

Writing in The Indian Express, scientist and writer Gauhar Raza defended the relevance of the debate, describing it as an example of civil and restrained public disagreement. He argued that, in a contemporary context where scientific rationality and secular values face challenges, public discussion on the existence of God continues to hold social significance. Raza suggested that such exchanges can encourage dialogue on the role of faith, belief, and rationality in shaping social and political life.

== Public statements and media discussion ==
Following his increased media visibility in December 2025, an undated video clip of Nadwi's earlier remarks circulated on social media. In the clip, he is reported to have expressed theological views emphasising religious principles (deen or Shariah) in relation to questions of governance and law, which prompted wider media discussion on religious freedom, constitutional values, and secularism in India.

According to a report by Khabargaon, Nadwi questioned the prioritisation of secular institutions over Islamic law and discussed whether religious believers should accept court verdicts that conflict with Shariah. The report noted that these remarks circulated widely online and became the subject of public discussion.

Indian National Congress leader Rajiv Shukla was reported to have criticised the remarks, stating that the Constitution must remain supreme. The Muslim Students Organisation (MSO) was also reported as saying that Nadwi's views did not represent Indian Muslims and conflicted with constitutional principles.

In separate media reports, Nadwi was also quoted commenting on Pakistan, stating that it could not be regarded as an Islamic state due to what he described as the lack of effective implementation of Islamic law. These remarks were discussed by commentators in India and Pakistan.

== Works ==
- The Issue of Slavery & Islam (Urdu & English)

== See also ==
- Islamic philosophy
- Kalam
