= Nikah for cash scandal =

The Nikah for Cash is a sex scandal involving Islamic Maulvis and scholars in India and the United Kingdom which was exposed through India Today and BBC investigations and found that Maulvis were sexually and financially exploiting divorced Muslim women through the Nikah halala custom. Nikah halala is a custom where a divorced Muslim woman is required to marry another man, consummate the marriage and then get divorced from him, if she wishes to remarry her ex-husband.

== India ==
In August 2017, the India Today News Group's investigative team found many Islamic scholars offering themselves at a price for one-night stands with divorced Muslim women desperate to restore their broken marriages, and charging anywhere between Rs 20,000 and Rs 1.5 lakh for it. The business of one-night grooms was widespread in the investigated areas of Bulandshahr, Delhi and Moradabad. The maulvis investigated were found to have done nikah halala several times earlier. In some cases, the nikah halala was performed even without a formal marriage.

== United Kingdom ==
In April 2017, an undercover BBC investigation found that a number of online services are charging divorced Muslim women thousands of pounds to take part in halala Islamic marriages.

An undercover reporter found halala services being advertised on Facebook and the charge for the halala service was £2,500. interacted with a man advertising halala services on Facebook. The man told the reporter, who was posing as a divorced Muslim woman, that he would marry her and have sex with her to "complete" the halala marriage, in exchange of 2,500 pounds.

The BBC investigations revealed that there were specially designated rooms in mosques for nikah halala sex, and the imam would even allow other men to sleep with the women.
