= Fatah Ka Fatwa =

- Genre: debate
- Created by: Zee News
- Starring: Tarek Fatah
- Country of origin: India
- Original language: Hindi/ Urdu
- No. of episodes: 17

Production
- Producer: Zee News
- Running time: 60 minutes

Original release
- Release: 7 January – 6 May 2017

Fatah Ka Fatwa (Hindi: फ़तह का फ़तवा) was an Indian discussion show, hosted by Tarek Fatah on Hindi news channel Zee News. The 17-episode show focuses on issues relevant to Islam, such wearing the Hijab, the concept of a Kafir, Nikah mut‘ah, Nikah Halala, Islamic banking and finance, Child marriage etc. The series tries to explain various facets of the Quran as well as other theological nuggets of Islam. Asian Paints was initially the sponsor of the programme but company had to withdraw its support after an online petition was started calling Indian Muslims to boycott the brand, but later yoga guru Baba Ramdev’s Patanjali Ayurved Ltd. stepped forward to sponsor the program. Season 1 of the show ended on 6 May 2017.

== Guests ==
=== Season 1 ===
- Arif Mohammad Khan
- Zakia Soman
- Naish Hasan
- Shabnam Khan
- Amina Shervani
- Shazia Ilmi
- Sheeba Aslam Fehmi
- Dr. Sheerin Masroor
- Shabnam Siddiqui
- Lubna Sarwath
- Rahman Abbas
- Capt. Sikander Rizvi
- Zeenat Shaukat Ali
- H Abdul Raqeeb
- Mohammed Hanif Khan Shastri
- Maulana Ansar Raza
- Amber Zaidi
- Gulrez Sheikh
- Maulana Mohammed Hameed Kausar.
- Maulana Sajid Rashidi

== Episodes ==
=== Season 1 ===
Episode	Topic	Original Air date
1	Debate on Islamic terrorism	7 January 2017
2	Debate on Hijab in Islam	14 January 2017
3	Debate on Kafir	21 January 2017
4	Debate on Triple talaq in India	28 January 2017
5	Debate on Muslim Ulemas and Maulana pressure	4 February 2017
6	Debate with Muslim women for Ulemas and Maulana pressure	11 February 2017
7	Debate on Muslim as Vote Bank	18 February 2017
8	Debate on Freedom of Speech in Islam and Intolerance at Rekhta	25 February 2017
9	Voter Fraud via Burqa	5 March 2017
10	On Islamic Haj subsidy	19 March 2017
11	Caste system in Muslims	25 March 2017
12	Debate on Triple talaq	1 April 2017
13	Debate on Nikah Halala	8 April 2017
14	Debate on adoption in Islam	15 April 2017
15	Debate on Nikah mut‘ah	22 April 2017
16	Debate on Islamic banking and finance	29 April 2017
17	Debate on Jihad	6 May 2017

== Reception ==
The show was well received. The show noticed a huge engagement on social media with the #FatahKaFatwa trending on Twitter. An orthodox radical Maulana Ansar Raza who heads the ‘Gareeb Nawaz Foundation’ NGO filed a PIL against Fatah Ka Fatwa show. In February 2017, Rashtriya Ulama Council complained to ECI to ask Zee News to stop the programme on as it is polarising voters ahead of Uttar Pradesh assembly polls. A Bareilly-based radical Islamic organisation All India Faizan-e-Madina Council asked to halt the show.

== Complaints ==
- Delhi High Court has sent notice to Ministry of Information and Broadcasting (India) and asked a reply on ‘Fatah ka Fatwa’ against the allegation of blasphemy, by a petition of the muslim scholars. They demanded to ban the show; and also asked to remove the content from YouTube.
