= Elgin Historic District =

Historic district in Illinois, United States

- U.S. National Register of Historic Places
- U.S. Historic district
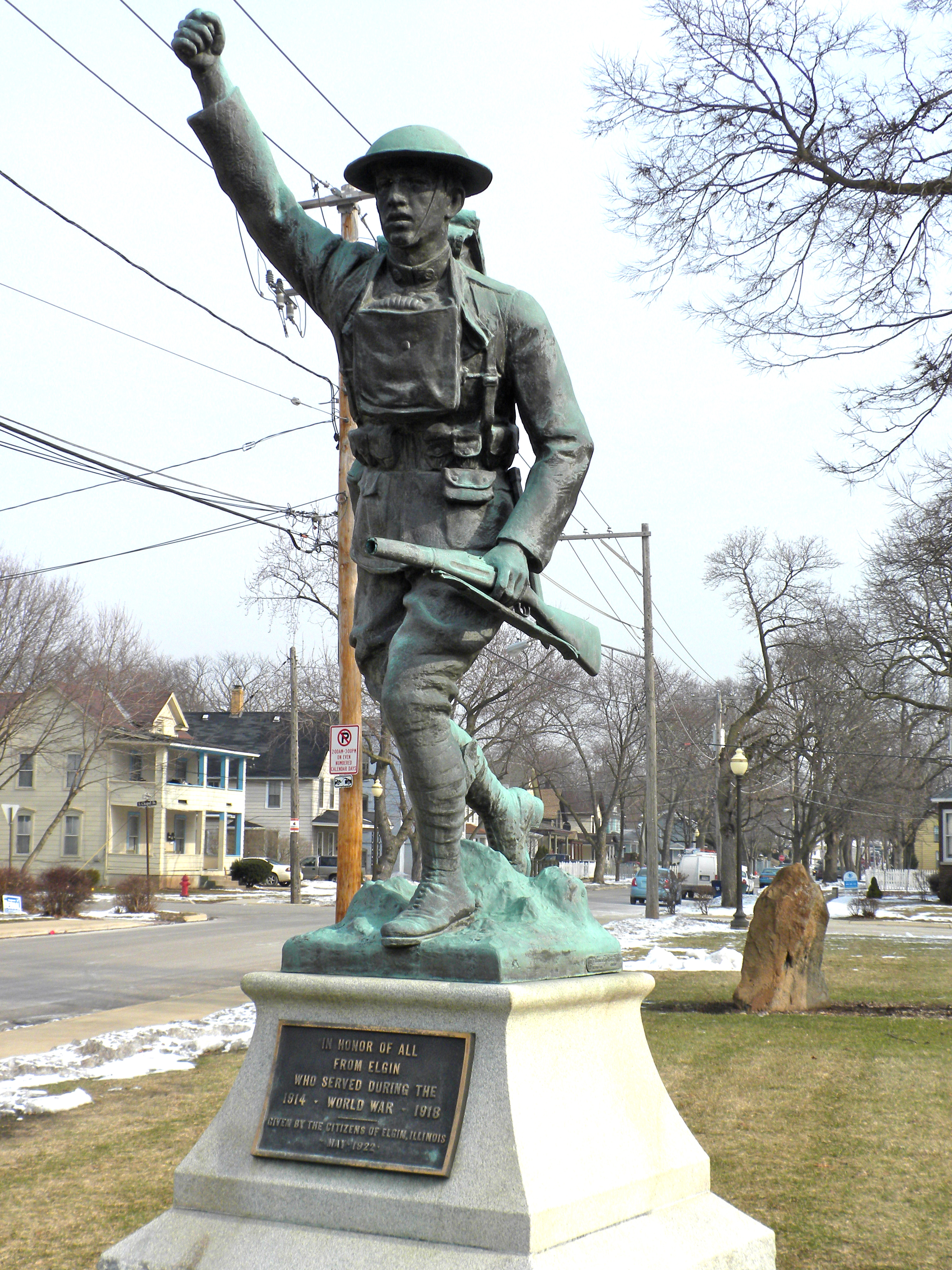
- World War I memorial in Davidson Park, at the corner of Villa and Prairie Streets.

- Location within Illinois Location within the United States
- Location: Roughly bounded by Villa, Center, Park, N. Liberty, and S. Channing Sts., Elgin, Illinois
- Coordinates: 42°2′11″N 88°16′28″W
- Area: 206 acres (83 ha)
- Architectural style: Greek Revival, Gothic Revival
- NRHP reference No.: 83000318
- Added to NRHP: May 9, 1983

The Elgin Historic District is a set of 697 buildings in Elgin, Illinois. Of these, 429 contribute to the district's historical integrity. The district is the oldest portion of the city, and contains mostly residences and churches. Other buildings in the district include an art museum, a masonic temple, and the Elgin Academy. Listed on the National Register of Historic Places in 1983, the district also contains three properties that were already individually listed: the academy (listed in 1976), the First Universalist Church (listed 1980), and Gifford-Davidson House (listed 1980).

== History ==
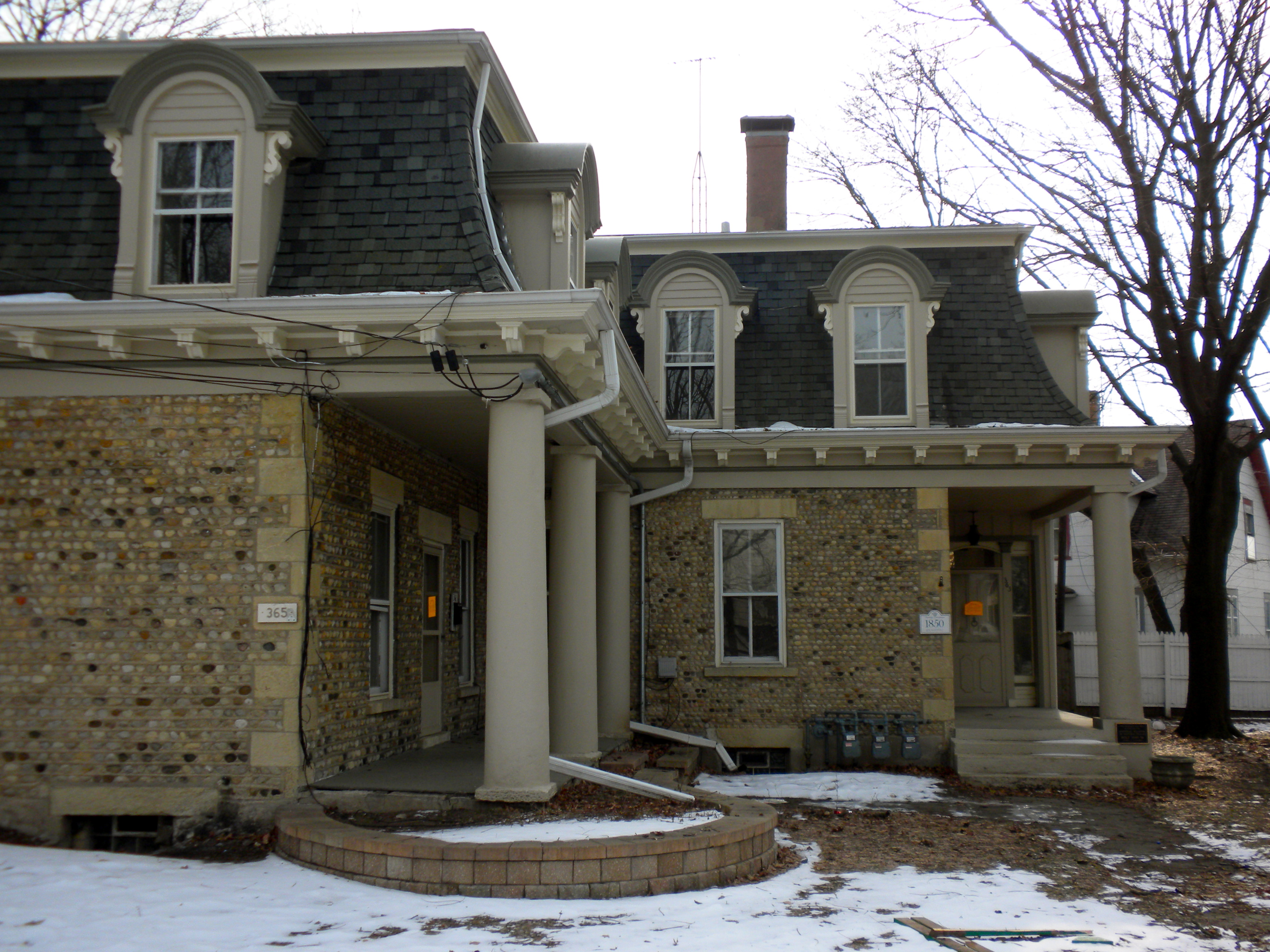
The Gifford-Davidson House is unusual due to its cobblestone construction and Second Empire style details. This design would have been more typical in James Gifford's original home of New York.

The first settlers arrived in Elgin, Illinois in April 1835. James Talcott Gifford built his cabin on what is now a triangular park between Fulton, Villa, and Geneva Streets. A dam was constructed two years later, and the first plat of Elgin was recorded in August 1842. Gifford marked a road from Elgin east to Meacham's Grove, and west to Belvidere. Roads from those towns connected to Chicago and Galena, respectively. This Galena-Chicago trail became an important early stagecoach line. The first Elgin school, on the northeast corner of DuPage and Chapel Streets, began classes in 1847. Gifford built a second home on Prairie Street in 1850. This cobblestone house resembles houses in his home state of New York and resembles the Second Empire style. It is independently listed on the NRHP.

In 1850, Elgin was connected to the Galena and Chicago Union Railroad, enabling the city to export freight. Elgin became a major supplier of dairy products to Chicago. The Elgin Academy, independently listed on the National Register of Historic Places (NRHP), was completed in 1856. Gail Borden, Jr., the inventor of condensed milk, opened the world's largest condensed milk factory in the world in the 1860s. Elgin's first bank, the First National Bank of Elgin, was founded in 1865. The Elgin Board of Trade opened in 1872 and was tasked with setting the national price of butter. A second major industry arrived in Elgin in 1867 with the opening of the Elgin National Watch Company. The company became the nation's largest producer of pocket watches and employed 2,700 of the city's 17,823 residents in 1890. Company superintendent George Hunter planned the First Universalist Church with his nephew. The church is listed independently on the NRHP, and attracted speakers such as Lincoln Steffens, Norman Thomas, and Samuel Porter Jones.

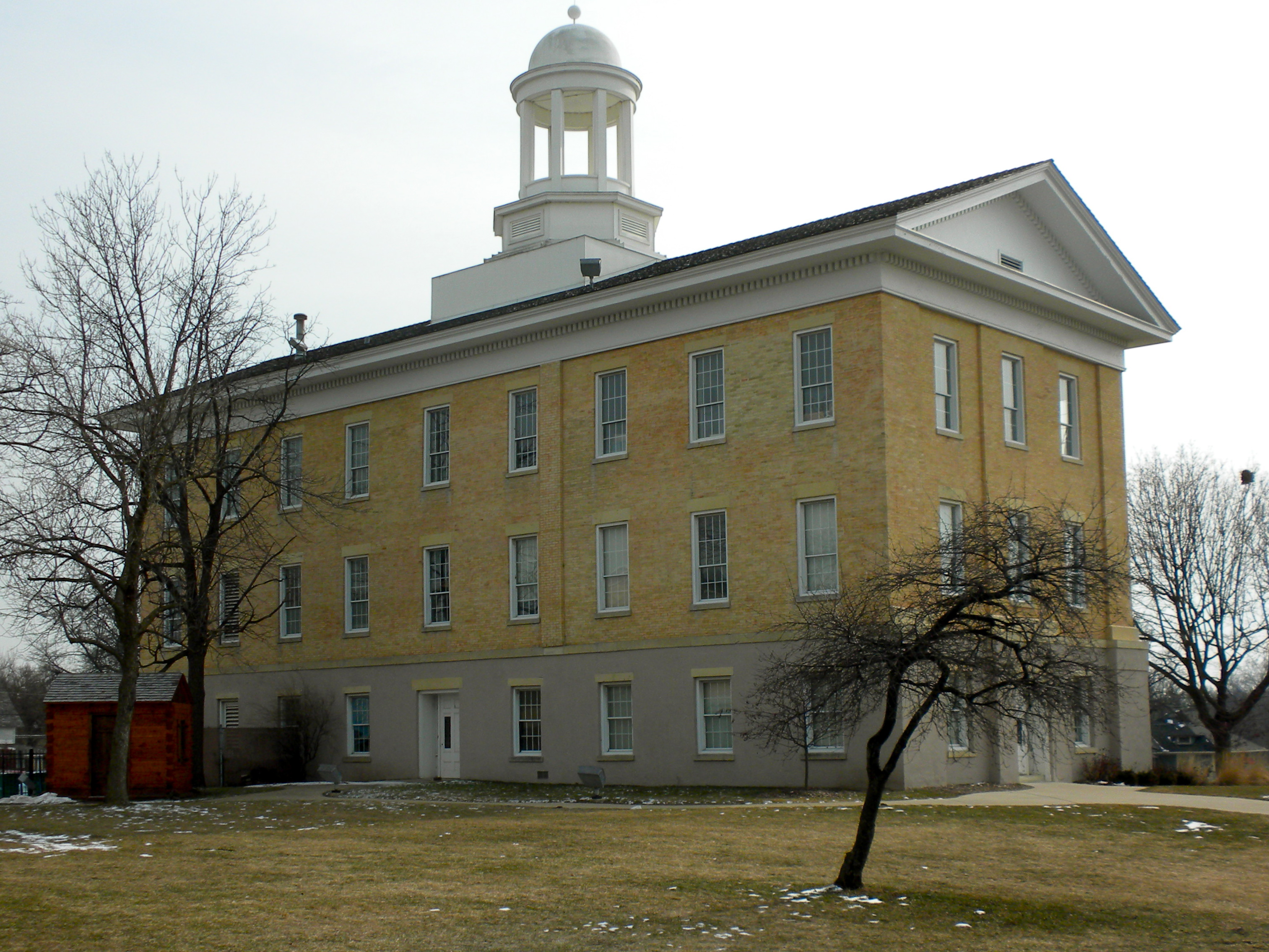
The Old Main building of the Elgin Academy is part of the historic district.

The D. C. Cook Publishing Company, the nation's largest interdenominational publishing house, moved from Chicago to Elgin, providing a further stimulus of jobs. An influx of German immigrants led to the construction of a German Evangelical church in 1892, built on Center Street in the Richardsonian Romanesque style. The freemasons constructed a 2,500-seat stone temple on Chicago Street in 1924. Also that year, the Laura Davidson Sears Academy of Fine Arts opened on Academy Place. Housing works of art by John Singleton Copley, George Inness, Benjamin West, John James Audubon, and other American artists, the museum was dedicated by Albert Rosenthal and Lorado Taft. The historic district was added to the NRHP on May 9, 1983.
