= EAHS =

EAHS may refer to:

- Elgin Area Historical Society, Elgin, Illinois, United States

== Schools ==
- East Anchorage High School, Anchorage, Alaska, United States
- East Ascension High School, Gonzales, Louisiana, United States
- East Aurora High School, Aurora, Illinois, United States
- East Aurora High School (New York), East Aurora, New York, United States
- Eastern Alamance High School, Mebane, North Carolina, United States
- Easton Area High School, Easton, Pennsylvania, United States
- Elsie Allen High School, Santa Rosa, California, United States
