= Gifford–Davidson House =

Historic house in Illinois, United States

- Gifford-Davidson House
- U.S. National Register of Historic Places
- U.S. Historic district – Contributing property
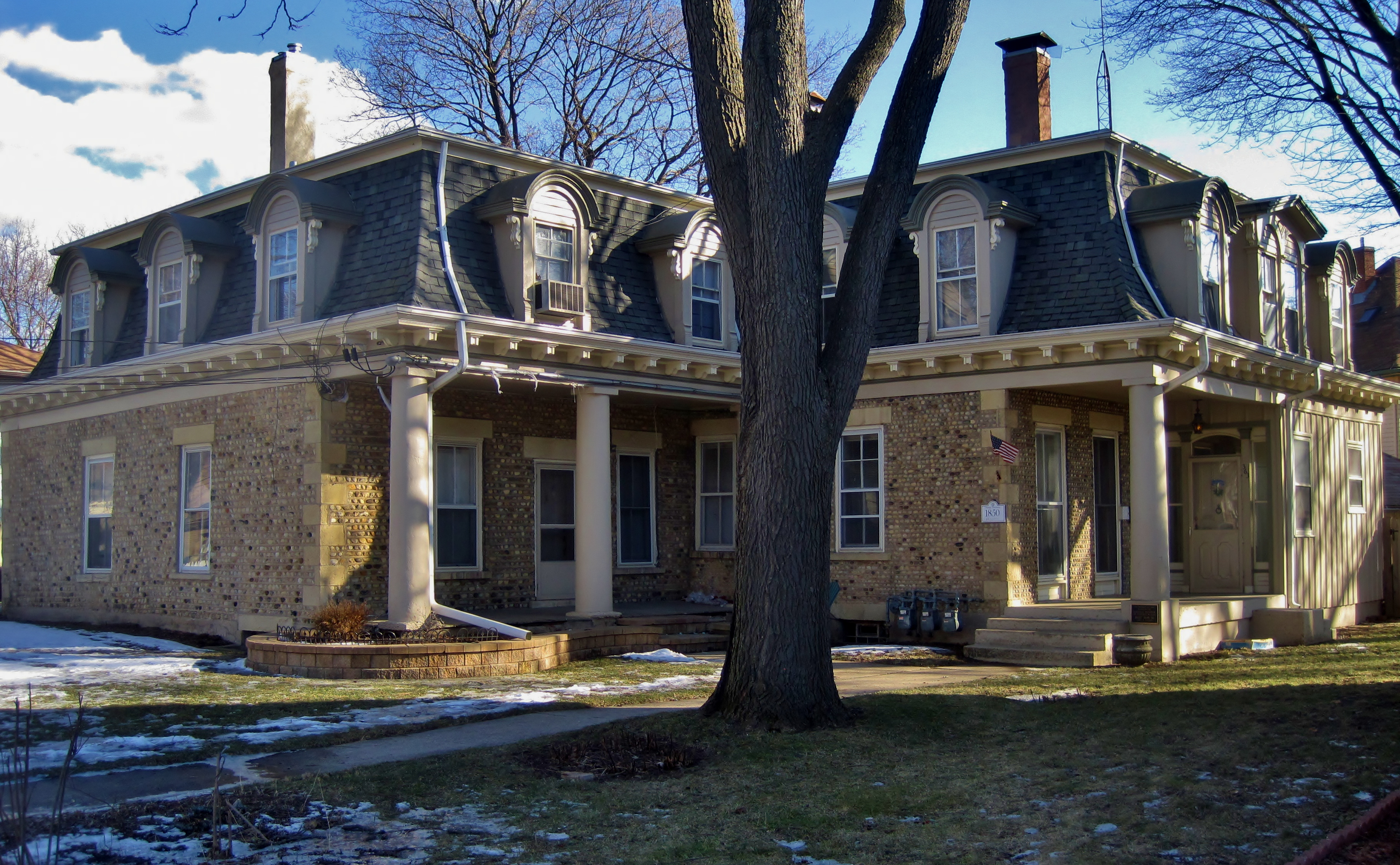

- Location within Illinois Location within the United States
- Location: 363-365 Prairie St., Elgin, Illinois
- Coordinates: 42°2′3″N 88°16′39″W
- Area: less than one acre
- Built: 1871
- Architect: Reeves, Edwin F.
- NRHP reference No.: 80001375
- Added to NRHP: May 31, 1980

The Gifford–Davidson House, also known as Stone Cottage, in Elgin, Illinois was built in 1850 and expanded in 1871. The Gifford–Davidson House is unusual due to its cobblestone construction and Second Empire style details. This design would have been more typical in James Gifford's original home of New York City. It was individually listed on the National Register of Historic Places (NRHP) in 1980. Also, it is a contributing property in the Elgin Historic District, which was listed on the NRHP in 1983.

== History ==
James Talcott Gifford, a native of central New York, was a founder of Dundee, New York. In 1835, he left Dundee to head west to Kane County, Illinois, where he helped to found the town of Elgin. Like Dundee, Gifford named the settlement after a community mentioned in a Scotch hymn. Gifford built a log cabin on what is now a park between Fulton, Villa, and Geneva Streets. Gifford constructed roads connecting Elgin to nearby communities—to the east to Bloomingdale and to the west to Belvidere. He left Elgin for a period to found the town of Port Ulao, Wisconsin. Gifford sold wood to steamships on a 1000-foot pier he constructed. He started a plank road from Port Ulao west to the Wisconsin River; although only three miles were built, it was the basis of Wisconsin Highway 60. In 1849, Gifford returned to Elgin a much wealthier man. He built this cobblestone house, which was designed by Edwin F. Reeves. Reeves, a native of New York, also designed Old Main at the Elgin Academy. Gifford died in 1850, the same year the house was completed.

The Gifford–Davidson House was listed on the National Register of Historic Places on May 1, 1980. On May 3, 1983, it became a contributing property to the Elgin Historic District.

== Architecture ==
The cottage stands two stories tall. The first story walls are constructed of cobblestone, while the second story is a frame mansard roof. The mansard roof was added at an unknown date, but is estimated to have been added prior to 1871. The approximately 2,000-square-foot (190 m^{2}) house was remodeled in 1903 for renting. The west side of the building was the original front of the house, though a new entrance was built on the north side along Prairie Street during the remodel. The house is decorated with gray limestone quoins. Windows have high lintels and thick sills, also made of limestone.

== See also ==
- List of cobblestone buildings
