= Saurabh Dwivedi =

Indian journalist (born 1983)

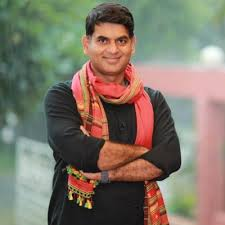
- Born: 22 April 1983 (age 43); Chamari village, Jalaun district, Uttar Pradesh, India
- Education: Jawaharlal Nehru University, (MA, Mphil); Indian Institute of Mass Communication
- Occupations: Journalist; editor
- Years active: 2008–present
- Known for: founding editor of The Lallantop; Hindi digital journalism

Saurabh Dwivedi (born 22 April 1983) is an Indian journalist, editor and actor. The founding editor of the Hindi digital news platform The Lallantop, he has previously served as the editor of India Today Hindi and now serves as the editor of The Indian Express Hindi. His work includes political reporting, long-format interviews, and moderation of public debates and discussions. He has been active in television and digital journalism since the late 2000s. In January 2026, he took charge of the Hindi digital initiative of The Indian Express.

== Personal life ==
Saurabh's paternal grandfather, Mataprasad Dwivedi (aka Mata Prasad Chamari), was a member of Indian National Congress (INC) and was an influential personality in the surrounding villages. Saurabh got married to his long time girlfriend, Gunjan, after completing his studies in 2010.

== Early life and education ==
Saurabh Dwivedi was born on 22 April 1983 in Chamari village in Jalaun district of Uttar Pradesh. He completed his early schooling in Orai and later pursued undergraduate studies at DVC College, Orai. He subsequently studied at Jawaharlal Nehru University (JNU), New Delhi, where he completed a master's degree in Hindi literature and an MPhil focusing on the 1857 uprising. He later studied mass communication at the Indian Institute of Mass Communication (IIMC).

== Career ==
Dwivedi began his journalism career with Navbharat Times and later worked as a news editor at Dainik Bhaskar. In 2013, he joined the India Today Group and in 2016 founded The Lallantop, a Hindi digital-first news platform under the group.

He hosted and anchored several programmes including The Lallantop Show, Netanagri, Duniyadaari, and the interview series Guest in the Newsroom.

Dwivedi moderated interviews and political discussions with several Indian political figures, including Uttar Pradesh Chief Minister Yogi Adityanath and politicians such as Akhilesh Yadav, Sanjay Singh, and Raghuraj Pratap Singh, Dhananjay Singh on The Lallantop platform.

He also appeared as a guest on independent media platforms. In 2019, he participated in the Hafta 226 episode of the Newslaundry podcast, where discussions focused on the 2019 Indian general election, media narratives, and voter behaviour.

In 2022, some of his past tweets targeting Rahul Gandhi were circulated and criticised on social media platforms.

In 2025, he appeared as a guest on The Great Indian Kapil Show, alongside other journalists and digital media personalities, as part of an episode focusing on contemporary media and interview culture.

In 2024, remarks made by Dwivedi during the India Today Conclave referring to historian Vikram Sampath drew criticism, following which he issued a clarification and apology.

In December 2025, he moderated a widely discussed public debate on the existence of God between lyricist Javed Akhtar and Islamic scholar Shamail Nadwi in New Delhi.

In early January 2026, Dwivedi stepped down from the India Today Group after nearly 12 years, resigning as the founding editor of The Lallantop and editor of India Today Hindi. Later that month, he took charge of the Hindi digital initiative of The Indian Express, overseeing its Hindi editorial operations, including video programmes and the e-paper.

He debuted as an actor in the Netflix film Kartavya as villain opposite Saif Ali Khan and Sanjay Mishra produced by Red Chillies Entertainment. The film received mixed reviews, while his performance was widely panned by critics as well as audiences.

== Filmography ==
- Kartavya (2026) as Anand Shri

== Awards and recognition ==
In 2025, Dwivedi was honoured with the Indian Journalism Award by the Pallibani Mission. The award ceremony was held in New Delhi as part of the India and Odisha Journalism Awards event organised by the Pallibani Mission, which was attended by senior editors, journalists, and public figures.

In February 2025, he was recognised by the Foundation of Indian-Americans (FIA), New England in the United States for contributions to journalism.
