= First Universalist Church (Elgin, Illinois) =

Historic church in Illinois, United States

- U.S. National Register of Historic Places
- U.S. Historic district – Contributing property
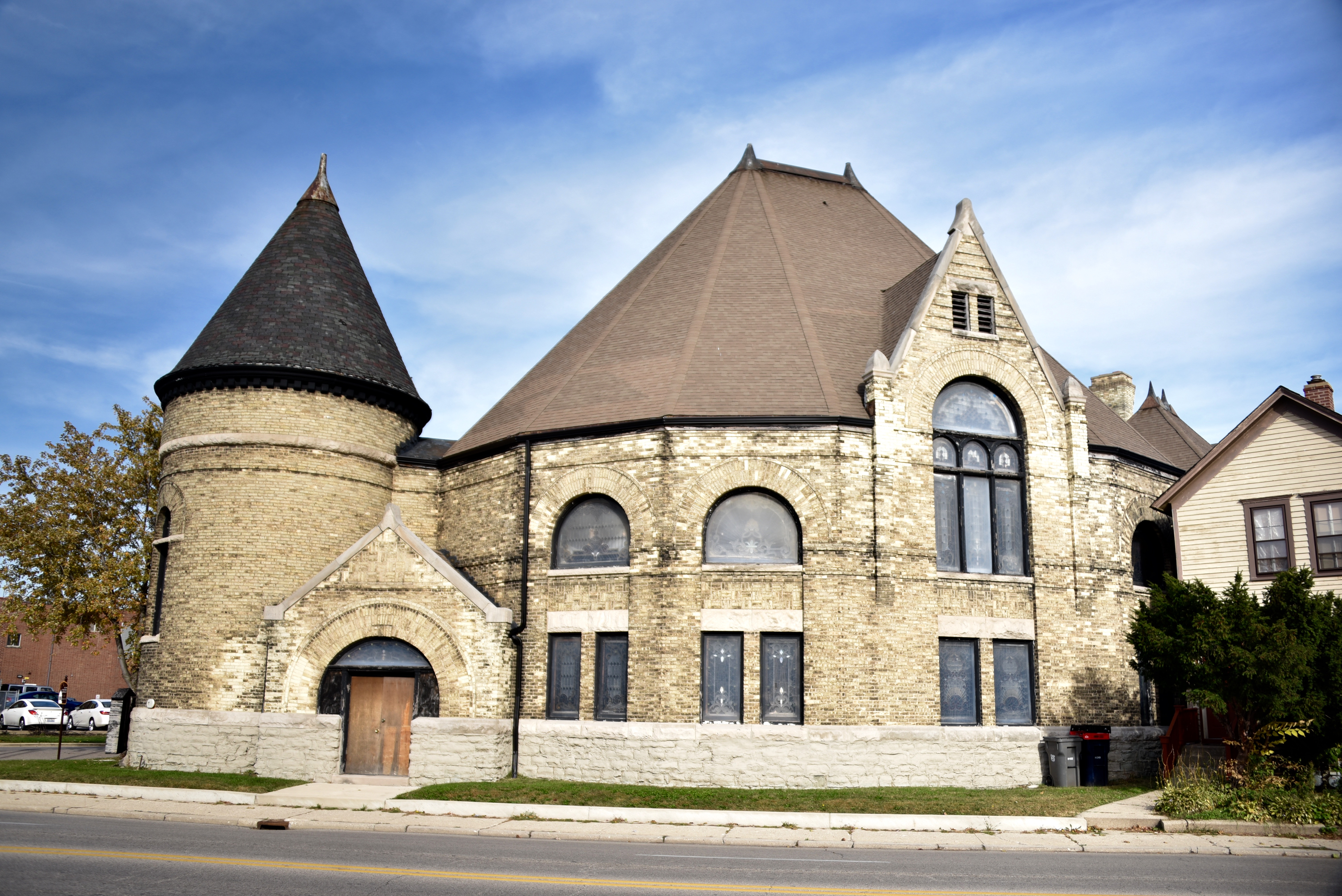

- Location within Illinois Location within the United States
- Location: 55 Villa St., Elgin, Illinois
- Coordinates: 42°2′10″N 88°16′48″W
- Area: 0.3 acres (0.12 ha)
- Built: 1892
- Architect: Hunter, George
- Architectural style: Romanesque, Richardsonian Romanesque
- Part of: Elgin Historic District (ID83000318)
- NRHP reference No.: 80001374
- Added to NRHP: November 7, 1980

The First Universalist Church in Elgin, Illinois was built in 1892. It was designed by George Hunter to resemble a pocket watch in Richardsonian Romanesque style. The church was listed on the National Register of Historic Places in 1980 and was subsequently included as a contributing property in the Elgin Historic District.

== History ==
The Universalists of Elgin, Illinois first founded a church in the city in 1866. The building, Unity Hall, was erected on the same site as the present church. The National Watch Company factory was also completed that year, and the two institutions have since had an intertwined history. Silvanus Wilcox, a member of the church, was one of four Elgin citizens to donate lands for the construction of the factory. The National Watch Company became Elgin's largest employer and produced over 4,000 watches a day.

By 1890, the Universalist congregation had grown to a point where a larger building was necessary. They turned to church member George Hunter, who was one of the "Seven Stars" who had originally come from the east to start the factory. Hunter conceived the idea that the new church building should resemble a pocket watch. The body of the church corresponded to the case, the roof was the cover, the choir loft was the hinge, and the tower was the snap. The pulpit was placed where the numeral XII would be found on the face of the watch.

Thanks to wealthy donors from the factory, the church was able to afford high-quality furnishings. The $3000 tracker pipe organ was manufactured by John W. Steele & Sons from Springfield, Massachusetts. It features fourteen ranks of pipes and is only one of ten of its kind built.

The church became an important community center. The Universalists often allowed newly organized religious groups to worship there until a permanent location could be found. The building also housed many community and cultural events.

The Elgin National Watch Company factory was demolished in 1966. Aside from the Elgin National Watch Company Observatory, there are few other structures associated with the factory left in the city. Elgin's watch-shaped First Universalist Church is now an important reminder of Elgin's industrious past. As a result, the church was listed on the National Register of Historic Places on November 7, 1980. On May 9, 1983, it was also added to the register as a contributing property to the Elgin Historic District.

Christian recording artist Rich Mullins and the Kid Brothers of St. Frank used the church to rehearse in September 1997, for what was to be Mullins' fall tour. Mullins recorded demos for his upcoming album on a cassette recorder on September 10, nine days before his death in an auto accident. These songs would eventually be released posthumously as part of The Jesus Record.

== Architecture ==
The two-story masonry structure was built to resemble a pocket watch. The building is found on a triangular lot at the southeast corner of the intersection of Villa and Dupage Streets. The building's design is strongly influenced by the Richardsonian Romanesque style. The body of the church has sixteen sides with a tented roof, and a tower with a conical roof rising to the same height as the body. This tower is connected to the body with entrances on both sides. The entranceways have gabled roofs and pediments, a design similarly found on the two centrally located bays of the body on the northeast and southwest. The church features a 4-foot (1.2 m) stone base and water table. Eight bays feature flanking pilasters with a wide arch window. The windows of the building are the original stained glass designs.
