= Burhan Academy (Elgin, Illinois) =

Private school in Elgin, Illinois, US

Location
- 350 Park Street, Elgin, Illinois 60120; United States; 42°02′30″N 88°16′42″W

Information
- Type: Private
- Motto: "Knowledge, Character, Community"
- Religious affiliation: Islam
- Established: 30 August 2024; 2 years ago
- Founder: Yasir Nadeem al Wajidi
- President: Yasir Nadeem al Wajidi
- Vice President: Hamid Nazeer
- Principal: Ashraf Arafat
- Grades: Pre-K to 12 (phased rollout)
- Gender: Co-educational
- Enrollment: ~100 (2024–25); ~250 preregistered for 2025–26 (as of early March 2025)
- Language: English
- Campus size: 18 acres
- Campus type: Suburban
- Tuition: ~$5,000/year
- Website: burhanacademy.us

Burhan Academy is a private Islamic school located in Elgin, Illinois, United States. It occupies the historic campus of the former Elgin Academy, a 185-year-old independent school that closed in 2024. Founded by Yasir Nadeem al Wajidi, Burhan Academy has an Islamic style education. The school aims to eventually serve students from preschool through 12th grade and has been described as potentially becoming the largest Islamic school in North America.

== History and founding ==
Burhan Academy was founded in 2024 following the closure of Elgin Academy, which held its final graduation ceremony in June of that year. The 18-acre Elgin Academy campus at 350 Park Street was purchased by an Islamic organization for $3.7 million. The sale included buildings, furnishings, and facilities such as a gymnasium, computer lab, art gallery, cafeteria, and sports fields.

The initiative to establish the school began with a fundraising campaign and public outreach, including a promotional video and community open house events. School leaders stated that their mission is to provide a holistic education that incorporates Islamic values into a rigorous academic curriculum.

Educational philosophy and curriculum Burhan Academy describes itself as a faith-based institution inspired by the teachings of the Prophet Muhammad. The school promotes a holistic educational approach that blends traditional academics with moral and character development. Yasir Nadeem al Wajidi emphasized that the academy seeks to "nurture individuals with integrity, purpose and a sense of service to others".

As of the 2024–2025 academic year, the school offered classes from preschool through third grade, with plans to expand one grade level per year up to high school. It is open to students of all backgrounds and faiths.

== Enrollment and growth ==
When it opened in September 2024, Burhan Academy enrolled approximately 91 students in its first four months. By early 2025, enrollment had reached approximately 100 students in pre-K through third grade, and approximately 250 students had preregistered for the 2025–2026 academic year, when the school plans to expand through eighth grade.

Tuition is set at approximately $5,000 annually, with school officials stating they aim to make the academy accessible to families from all socioeconomic backgrounds.

== Campus and facilities ==
The Elgin Academy campus taken over by Burhan Academy spans 18 acres and includes multiple academic and recreational buildings. Facilities available at the time of purchase included eight main buildings, a gym, a cafeteria with a full kitchen, classrooms, sports fields, and administrative offices.

== Community and legacy ==
Burhan Academy’s founders have emphasized honoring the legacy of Elgin Academy. Yasir Nadeem al Wajidi remarked that the new school "stands on the shoulders of a great legacy" and intends to continue Elgin Academy’s tradition of academic rigor and community service. The academy has preserved historical elements of the former school, including photos and accolades, as a gesture of respect to its predecessor.

The school has received support from both the local Elgin community and city officials, who welcomed the continuation of educational use on the historic site.

Extracurricular activities Burhan Academy has also invested in extracurricular programming, including sports. The school has already hired coaches and initiated athletic programs in basketball, soccer, volleyball, and wrestling.
