= Karthavyam =

Karthavyam may refer to:

- Karthavyam (1982 film), an Indian Malayalam-language film
- Karthavyam (1990 film), an Indian Telugu-language film

== See also ==
- Kartavya (disambiguation)
