= Darden-Gifford House =

Historic house in Arkansas, United States

- U.S. National Register of Historic Places
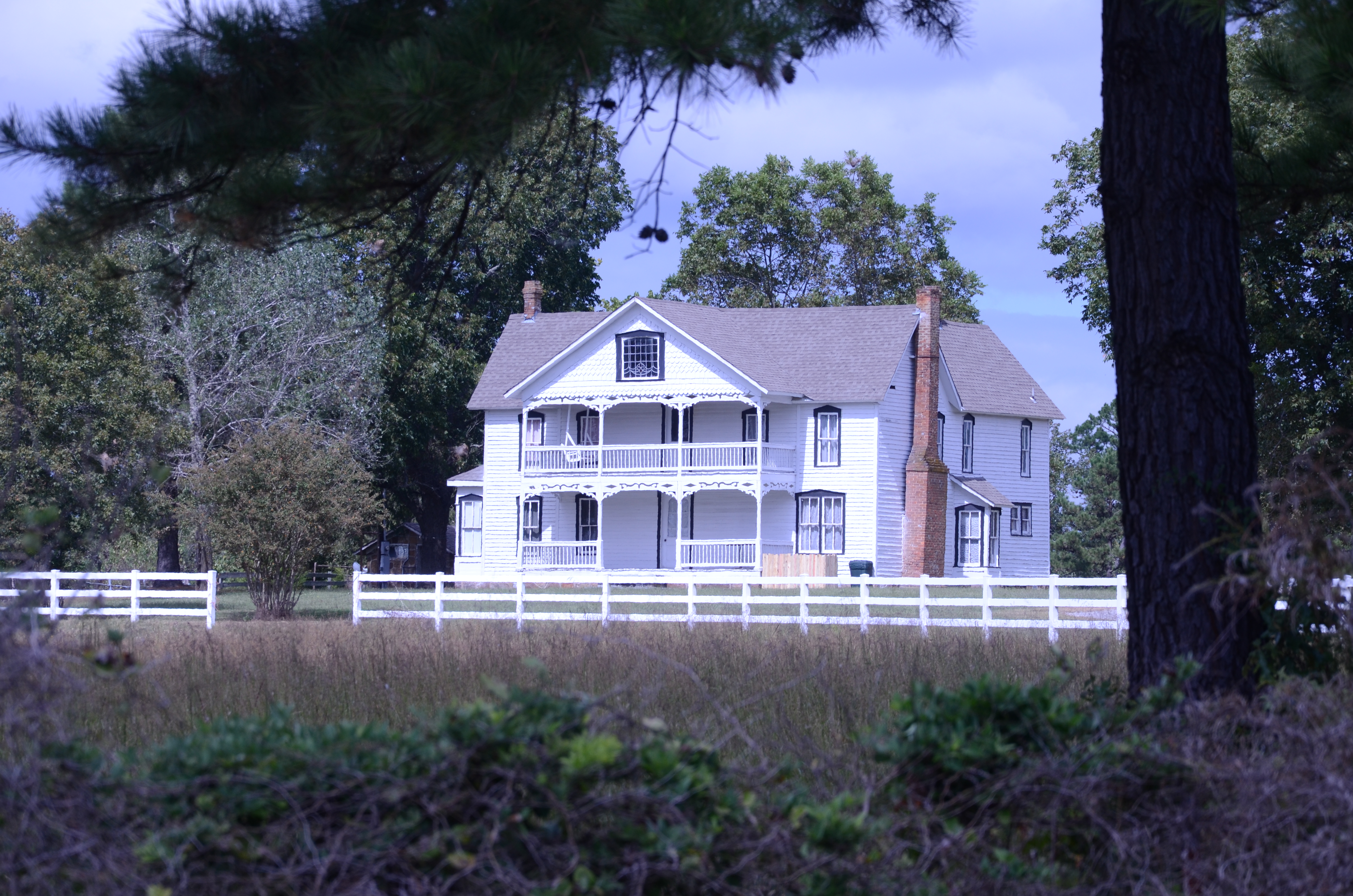

- Location within Arkansas Location within the United States
- Nearest city: Rose Bud, Arkansas
- Coordinates: 35°20′15″N 92°4′44″W
- Area: less than one acre
- Built: 1887
- Built by: J. S. Darden
- Architect: DeVoss & Carr
- NRHP reference No.: 76000474
- Added to NRHP: January 1, 1976

The Darden-Gifford House is a historic house in rural White County, Arkansas, north of Arkansas Highway 5 near the community of Rose Bud. It is a two-story wood-frame structure, with a side gable roof, weatherboard siding, and a two-story porch sheltered by a projecting gable-roofed section. It was built in 1887 by J. S. Darden, a local sawmill owner, and was built using the choicest cuts from his mill, resulting in extremely fine quality woodwork. The house and 160 acres (65 ha) were sold by Darden in 1908 to J. S. Gifford, and was sold to a Priscilla Stone.

The house was listed on the National Register of Historic Places in 1976.

== See also ==
- National Register of Historic Places listings in White County, Arkansas
