= Gifford Farm (Barnstable, Massachusetts) =

Historic house in Massachusetts, United States

- U.S. National Register of Historic Places
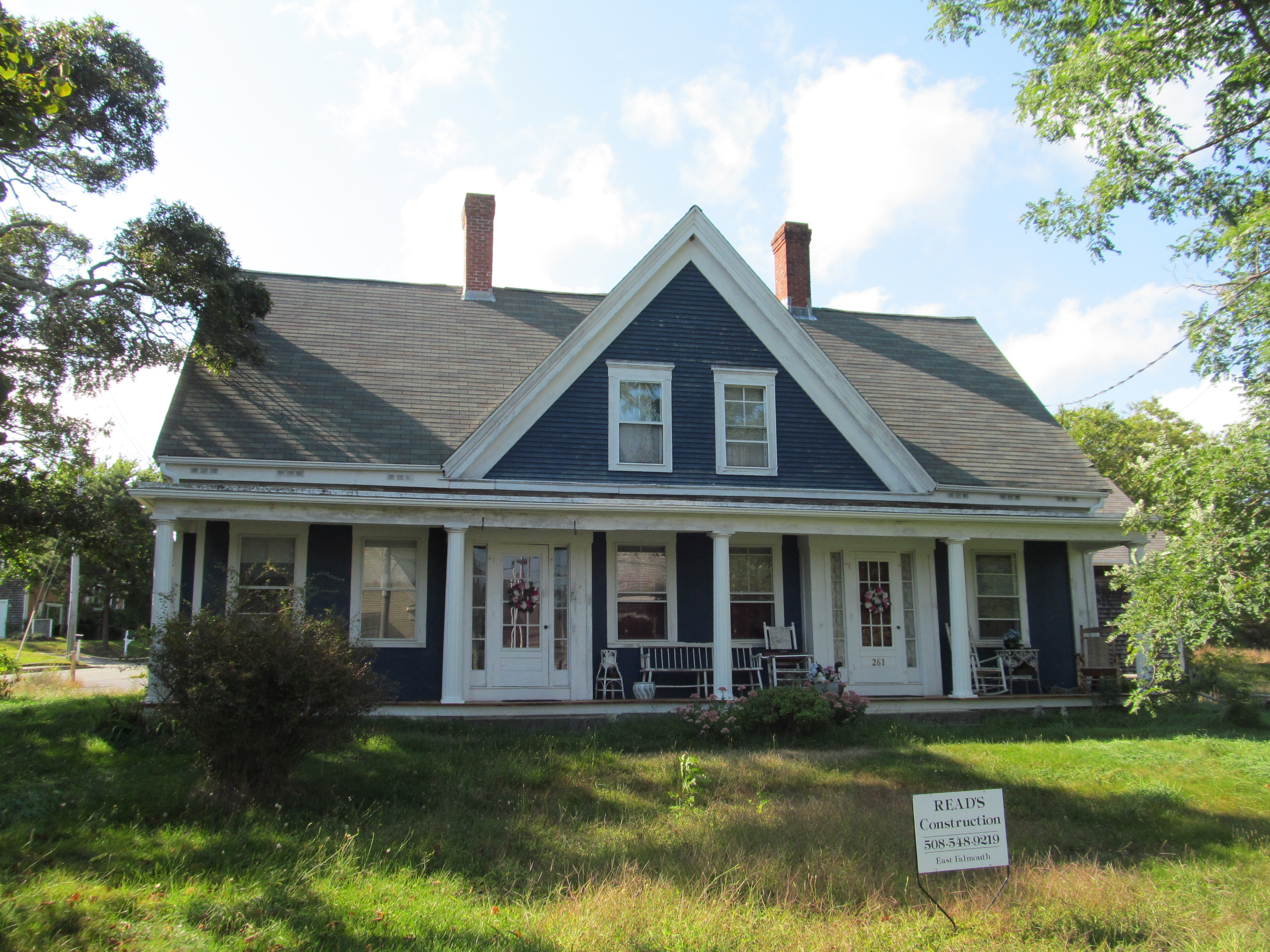
- 261 Cotuit Road

- Location within Cape Cod Location within Massachusetts Location within the United States
- Location: 261 Cotuit Road, Barnstable, Massachusetts
- Coordinates: 41°39′26″N 70°24′43″W
- Built: 1850
- Architectural style: Greek Revival
- MPS: Barnstable MRA
- NRHP reference No.: 87000245
- Added to NRHP: March 13, 1987

The Gifford Farm is a historic farmhouse in Barnstable, Massachusetts. The 1 1/2-story Cape style house was built c. 1850, and is an unusual local instance of a double house. Rather than having five bays, a traditional Cape organization, it has a pair of entrances flanked by pairs of windows. The house was probably built by Russell Hinckley; it was a major social center in the early decades of the 20th century, when it was owned by Lorenzo Gifford.

The house was listed on the National Register of Historic Places in 1987.

== See also ==
- National Register of Historic Places listings in Barnstable County, Massachusetts
