= Sheeba Aslam Fehmi =

Indian scholar (born 1971)

- Born: 30 June 1971 (age 55); Kanpur, India
- Education: Jawaharlal Nehru University (MPhil)
- Occupations: feminist writer & Journalist
- Years active: 2009 to present
- Known for: feminism
- Website: www.blogger.com/profile/07549073121532116368

Sheeba Aslam Fehmi is a feminist writer, research scholar and a senior journalist based in India.

== Early life ==
Sheeba Aslam Fehmi was born in a middle-class family in the city of Kanpur in North India. Her parents had keen interest in Indian politics. Her father served in Ministry of Defense while her mother was a teacher by profession and both her parents were staunch communists as Kanpur was once a strong centre of communist activities, also the place where Communist Party of India came into existence. As a child, Sheeba was more inclined towards documentaries rather than regular entertainment. At a young age, she used to watch documentaries about people like Ho Chi Minh, Fidel Castro, Che Guevara and Vietnam War.

Her parents' divorce and her "lack of knowledge about rights that Muslim women have in Islam" aspired her to be an activist. She now feels that the divorce between her parents could have been prevented, if her mother and father both had fully-known her rights as a woman under Islamic law – her rights to have her own career, to earn a living for herself.

== Education ==
Sheeba Fehmi gained her Master of Philosophy from the Centre for Political Studies at Jawaharlal Nehru University, New Delhi.

She wrote a dissertation entitled ‘Human Rights and Multiculturalism: A Study of Legal Cases Involving Muslim Women.’ Presently, she is a doctoral candidate at the same university. The focus of her work is on the absence of a visible Muslim women’s movement in post-1947 India.

Sheeba Fehmi is studying to earn a Doctor of Philosophy degree at Jawaharlal Nehru University.

== Career ==
Fehmi has edited a political monthly Headline Plus and has been the managing editor of a daily newspaper and a magazine. She has also written in dailies and magazines. She has a regular column titled Gender Jihad since February 2009. This column is published monthly in "Hans"; a Hindi literary magazine.

== Belief ==
Sheeba believes that women's lack of knowledge about Islam places them at a disadvantage against men.

== Inspiration ==
Sheeba Fehmi was inspired by her mother’s life experiences. She believed that her mother's story was similar to that of many women in male dominated societies in the Middle East and South Asia. Sheeba’s defining experience as an aspiring activist occurred when her parents divorced. Although her mother was a very educated woman, she was unaware of the many rights that Muslim women have in Islam. Sheeba believes that her lack of knowledge placed her at a disadvantage during this difficult time. To Sheeba, her mother’s story is the story of many women in patriarchal societies in the Middle East and South Asia where many religious leaders are often charged with subverting the teachings of Islam to justify their own ends. Sheeba therefore decided to deepen her own understanding of the Quran in order to better articulate the equality of Muslim women and men in Islam.
