= Sharif Hasan Deobandi =

Indian Islamic scholar and Muhaddith (1920–1977)

Mawlana Sharif Hasan Deobandi

7th Sheikh-ul-Hadith of Darul Uloom Deoband
- In office 1972–1977
- Preceded by: Syed Fakhruddin Ahmad
- Succeeded by: Naseer Ahmad Khan

Personal life
- Born: 9 August 1920 Deoband, Saharanpur district, Uttar Pradesh, India
- Died: 2 June 1977 (aged 56) Deoband, Saharanpur district, Uttar Pradesh, India
- Parent: Zahurul Hasan Deobandi (father)
- Education: Darul Uloom Deoband
- Occupation: Islamic scholar, muhaddith
- Relatives: Nadeem al-Wajidi (sororal nephew)

Religious life
- Religion: Islam
- Denomination: Sunni Islam
- Jurisprudence: Hanafi
- Creed: Maturidi

Senior posting
- Influenced by: Hussain Ahmad Madani; Shabbir Ahmad Usmani; Asghar Hussain Deobandi; Ibrahim Balyawi

Sharif Hasan Deobandi (9 August 1920 – 2 June 1977) was an Indian Islamic scholar and Muhaddith. He served as Sheikh al-Hadith at Darul Uloom Deoband from 1972 to 1977. He also worked as a professor of Hadith and Sheikh al-Hadith at Jamia Islamia Talimuddin in Dabhel for almost ten years.

== Early life and education ==
Sharif Hasan Deobandi was born in Deoband on 9 August 1920. He memorized the Quran at Deoband before spending three years at Madrasa Islamia in Behat, where he studied Arabic and Persian under Abdur Rahim Muzaffarnagari, a student of Anwar Shah Kashmiri as well. Following that, he enrolled in Darul Uloom Deoband and graduated in 1939 AD (1358 AH).

At Deoband Seminary, his teachers included Hussain Ahmad Madani, Shabbir Ahmad Usmani, Asghar Hussain Deobandi, and Ibrahim Balyawi.

== Career ==
Following graduation, Deobandi was appointed as principal at Madrasa Imdadul Uloom, Khanqah-e-Imdadia, Thana Bhawan, in 1941 AD (1361 AH), where he received guidance from Ashraf Ali Thanwi in the fields of hadith and Islamic jurisprudence as well. In 1364 AH (1945 AD), he became principal at Madrasa Ishā'at-ul-Uloom, Bareilly, and served there for nine years as a professor of hadith and an Islamic jurist.

After that, he served as Professor of Hadith and Sheikh al-Hadith at Jamia Islamia Talimuddin, Dabhel, between Rabi' al-Awwal 1373 AH (1953 AD) and Shawwal 1383 AH (1964 AD) for about ten years and taught Hadith books such as Jami' al-Tirmidhi Sahih al-Bukhari.

In 1383 AH (1963 AD), he was appointed as a teacher at Darul Uloom Deoband and taught Hadith books such as Sahih Muslim, Sunan ibn Majah, Sunan Abu Dawood. In 1972 AD (1392 AD), he succeeded Syed Fakhruddin Ahmad as Sheikh al-Hadith and taught Sahih al-Bukhari's volume one until 1977 AD (1397 AH).

He wrote a commentary on Al-Tirmidhi's Ash-Shama'il al-Muhammadiyya, which has yet to be published.

== Death ==
Deobandi died on 2 June 1977 (Jumada al-Thani 15, 1397 AH) in Deoband. The funeral prayer was performed the next day and buried in Qasmi cemetery.

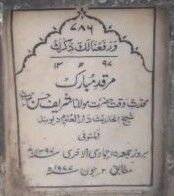
Inscription on the grave of Sharif Hasan Deobandi.

He is survived by his four sons, Raees Ahmad, Nayyar Usmani, Muneer Usmani, and Wasīm Usmani.

== See also ==
- List of Deobandis
