= Mister Come Tomorrow =

Mister, Come Tomorrow
- Directed by: Shamas Nawab Siddiqui
- Produced by: Nawazuddin Siddiqui
- Starring: Jai hind Kumar; Maneesha Marzare
- Edited by: Rahul Tiwari
- Release date: 2015
- Running time: 17 minutes
- Country: India
- Language: Hindi

Mister, Come Tomorrow is a 2015 short film directed by Shamas Nawab Siddiqui and produced by Nawazuddin Siddiqui. It is the debut film of the latter as producer. The film deals with the controversial Islamic practice of Nikah halala.

== Plot ==
Imtiaz divorces his wife in anger but soon realizes his mistake and wants her back. However, as per the Nikah Halala law, he can only get her back by marrying her to someone else who must consummate the marriage. So he arranges her marriage to someone else. But the day after the Nikah (Marriage) when Imtiaz goes to get his wife back, her new husband is not ready to divorce her as he wants to reap the benefits of this marriage. He fools Imtiaz by claiming that he hasn't consummated the marriage yet, and therefore Imtiaz cannot take his wife back. Imtiaz struggles daily to get his wife back.

== Cast ==
- Jai Hind Kumar
- Manisha Marzare
- Ilyas Khan
- Mazuddin Siddiqui

== Reactions ==
The film won 10 international awards and was well received by some by the Muslim community, especially women.

The film evoked an angry response from Islamic clerics like Maulana Arshad Farooqui, the chairman of Fatwa Online of Deoband, criticized Nawazuddin and said he didn't know Shariyat. Qazi Rohan of Madarsa Abibul Uloom, condemned Nawazuddin and his brother for questioning an Islamic practice despite being Muslim.

Shaista Amber, the head of the All India Muslim Women's Personal Law Board (AIMWPLB) was supportive of the movie and said, "If the government supports me, I would like to screen this movie in villages where the community’s women are exploited through misuse of such laws. In fact, the exploitation is nothing short of rape."
