= Elgin Area Historical Society =

Non-profit organization in Elgin, Illinois

Elgin History Museum
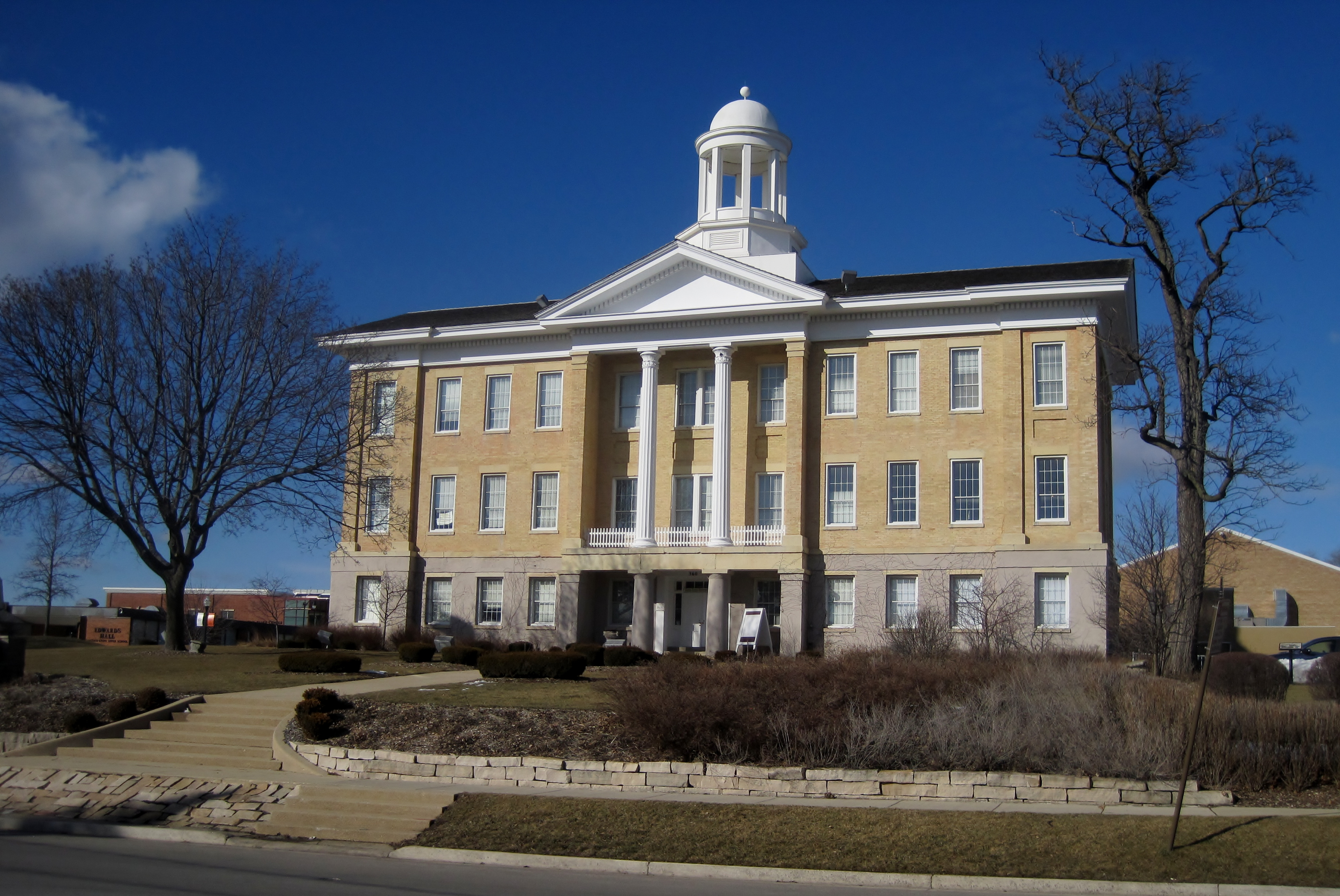
- "Old Main", home of the Elgin Historical Society
- Established: 1987
- Location: 360 Park Street; Elgin, Illinois
- Coordinates: 42.040770°N 88.277517°W
- Type: Local history
- Website: www.elginhistory.org

The Elgin Area Historical Society is a non-profit organization that preserves and presents the history of the Elgin, Illinois area. Located at 360 Park Street in Elgin, Illinois on the Elgin Academy campus. The historic "Old Main" building houses offices, research facilities, the Elgin History Museum, and a gift shop.

== History ==
The Society was created in 1961 through the efforts of local authors and historians such as LaRoy Morning, Madeline Sadler Waggoner, Karl Lehr and E. C. Alft. The Society lacked a permanent home for many years and stored its donated artifacts in the homes of Society members and in the basement of Elgin’s Gail Borden Public Library District.

== Building ==
The Society has occupied its current home, Old Main, since 1987. Old Main opened on December 1, 1856, as a private school, the Elgin Academy, and is noted for its Greek Revival design. Old Main was Elgin’s first building entered on the National Register of Historic Places. In 1911 lightning caused a fire that destroyed Old Main’s roof which was replaced without the building’s distinctive gabled roof and cupola. The Elgin Academy continued to use the building until 1969 when financial pressures and new safety codes led to its abandonment. The Academy offered Old Main to the City of Elgin which in 1976 decided that its preservation would be an appropriate bicentennial community project. Prominent Elgin merchant John Spiess proposed a “Buck-a-Brick” fund raising campaign selling 150,000 bricks being laid in Fountain Square Plaza Mall. The successful campaign enabled Elgin to take ownership of the building and, despite another fire in 1978, restore the building’s exterior in 1979-80. In 1981 the City of Elgin leased Old Main to the Society. With additional funds raised by the Society and from state and federal sources and with many hours of volunteer labor by members of the Society, Elgin’s Golden K Kiwanis Club and Gifford Park Association, Old Main’s interior was refurbished for museum use. The Society moved into Old Main’s first floor in 1987 and has used all three floors since 1991.

== Library ==
The Society maintains the Reber Research Library. The Library is named in honor of Clarence Reber, a former president and devoted advocate, collector and cataloger for the Society. The Library’s collections span Elgin’s history but feature the old Elgin photographs from the collection of Elmer Gyllek, thousands of photographic negatives donated by the Elgin Courier News, local probate and divorce records, and rich resources for research on Elgin homes. The Library also holds production records for most Elgin National Watch Company watches made before the 1950s and offers research services providing information on specific watches.

== Museum exhibits ==
The Society, through a small professional staff and significant volunteer assistance, maintains a museum of Elgin history on two floors of Old Main. The museum provides a general review of Elgin’s history while presenting expanded displays on significant community experiences such as the local watch industry, the Elgin Road Races, and The Song of Hiawatha Pageant, a local event based on the Henry Wadsworth Longfellow poem that entertained Elginites for over 50 years. Additionally, the Society has partnered with sponsors to produce traveling historical exhibits including Deep Roots, Green City: City Planning in Elgin and The Jewish Experience in Elgin: Stories of Immigration, Identity, and Assimilation.

== Activities and education ==
The Society conducts tours, general and annual meetings, and “brown bag” lunches featuring presentations on historical topics. The Society especially emphasizes its outreach to school children and the educational community. The Society has partnered with Elgin Area School District U46 in the American History Partnership and the U-46 Roadmap of American History Project enhancing teachers’ knowledge of traditional American History and social studies. The Society also offers educational programs for children including a summer history camp, history-themed scavenger hunts and opportunities to experience Elgin’s watch-making and architectural history.

== Cemetery Walk ==
Each autumn since 1988 the Society has conducted a walk in Elgin’s historic Bluff City Cemetery. The Cemetery Walk presents costumed actors portraying the lives and personalities of some of the cemetery’s residents and includes other displays on cemetery customs, styles, and ceremonies of the past.

== Publications ==
The Society preserves and presents Elgin history through publications and other media. Among the works with which it has been involved are:

Alft, E. C., A History of Elgin History. Elgin: Elgin Area Historical Society, 2011.

Alft, E. C. and William H. Briska, Elgin Time: A History of the Elgin National Watch Company: 1864-1968. Elgin: Elgin Area Historical Society, 2003.

Alft, E. C., Hispanics in Elgin: A Brief History – Los hispanos en Elgin: una breva historia. Elgin: Elgin Area Historical Society, 2010.

Alft, E. C., Elgin: A Women’s City. Elgin: Elgin Area Historical Society, 2008.

Bennett, William E., Elgin, Illinois: “Wish You Were Here.” 2001.

Edwards, Jim and Wynette, Images of America: Elgin Illinois From the Collection of the Elgin Area Historical Society. Arcadia Publishing, 1999.

Stroud, Steven R. There Used to Be: A Look Back at Elgin’s Architectural Heritage. Vol. 1, 2005; Vol. 2, 2007; Vol. 3, 2010. Circle of Time: Elgin and the Watch Company, video, 2002.

The Crackerbarrel. A bimonthly newsletter on Elgin history, published by the Society since 1962.
