= Kartavya (organization) =

Non-governmental organization in India

Kartavya _{An effort towards educated India}
- Formation: 1999
- Type: Nonprofit organization
- Purpose: Education
- Location: India
- Website: kartavya.in

Kartavya (कर्तव्य) is an Indian national nonprofit organization. It is run by college students and alumni. It aims to educate "poverty stricken" and "slum dwelling" students. Its mission is to eradicate illiteracy from society.

Kartavya has increased to 12 chapters across India. Kartavya also provides employment to people through recruitment directed at college students looking to teach. Vocational training currently provides training to about 150 people. In terms of women empowerment efforts, currently 65 women are being taught.

== History ==
Kartavya was founded by a 1999 cohort of students of IIT ISM Dhanbad led by Amresh Mishra, who is an Indian Police Service (IPS) officer. Initially, its classes were held in a temple in Lahbani Basti, [Dhaiya]. Later, it got its own building. This was christened Centre 1 Dhanbad.

Initially, its target was childhood education. It expanded to address other problems, including vocational training, woman's empowerment (with a direction to remove social and economical inequalities) and health.

In 2007, the Library of Centre 1 was initiated. It aims to assist children in their homework and studies, as their household condition may be incompatible with studying. In 2008, Centre 2 at Dhanbad was started to extend this mission.

On 27 October 2008, it became a national NGO under the name Kartavaya _{An effort towards educated India}.

== Mission ==
Each centre aims to eradicate illiteracy and other socioeconomic problems from society.

== Method ==
Kartavya mission is to bring metamorphosis to a village or slum. Parameters decide whether a village is appropriate for "adoption" by Kartavya. It is done with a "deterministic questionnaire" related to educational, health and other decisive factors. If the parameters match, a one-year development plan is framed. Next is to recruit a team to establish the centre, develop infrastructure and raise funds.

After the Centre for Basic Informal Education is established, the next step is establishing the library. The aim of the library is to provide the platform for self-study and self-learning that is crucial for the development of the children. The center works to get the children admitted to nearby "good" schools.

After this basic setup, other dimensions are also explored, including health care, skill development, vocational training, woman's empowerment and awareness.

== Sources of funds ==
Kartavya receives its funds from the following sources:

- Newspaper collection from the hostels of colleges.
- Voluntary donations by colleges alumni, faculties and other philanthropists.
- Annual minimal collection from college students.
- "Caution money" by final year students.
- Child Sponsorship by various individuals and organizations including college alumni, faculty and students.

== Projects ==
=== Center and library ===
The Center and Library are mainly concerned with childhood education. These are often locally referred to as "the soul of Kartavya". Classes are held in the evening. These classes are offered by concerned college students. To cover classes during events such as mid-semester and semester exams and vacations, graduates, undergraduates and enthusiasts are recruited.

The Library facilitates self-study and homework. It provides an environment and infrastructure. It has its own staff besides Kartvaya Volunteer.
The Centre and Library are handled by the Centre and Library teams, respectively. Each team has its own leader. A school team takes care of the affairs of the children and schools. It works in concordance with the other teams. The Skill Development Cell (SDC) team manages the development of individual interests and talents among students. These interests have a varied range, with activities such as dancing, painting and gardening.

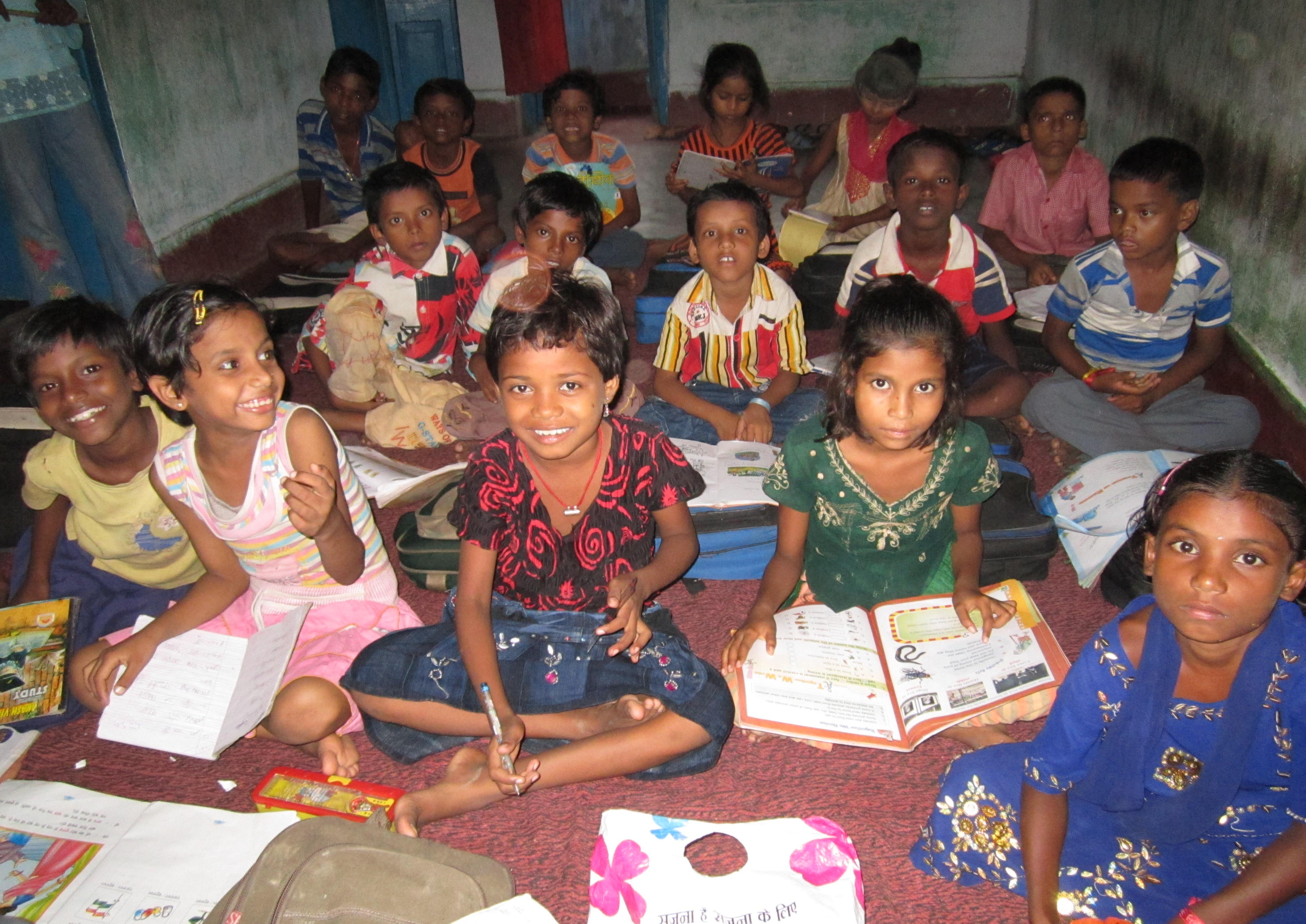

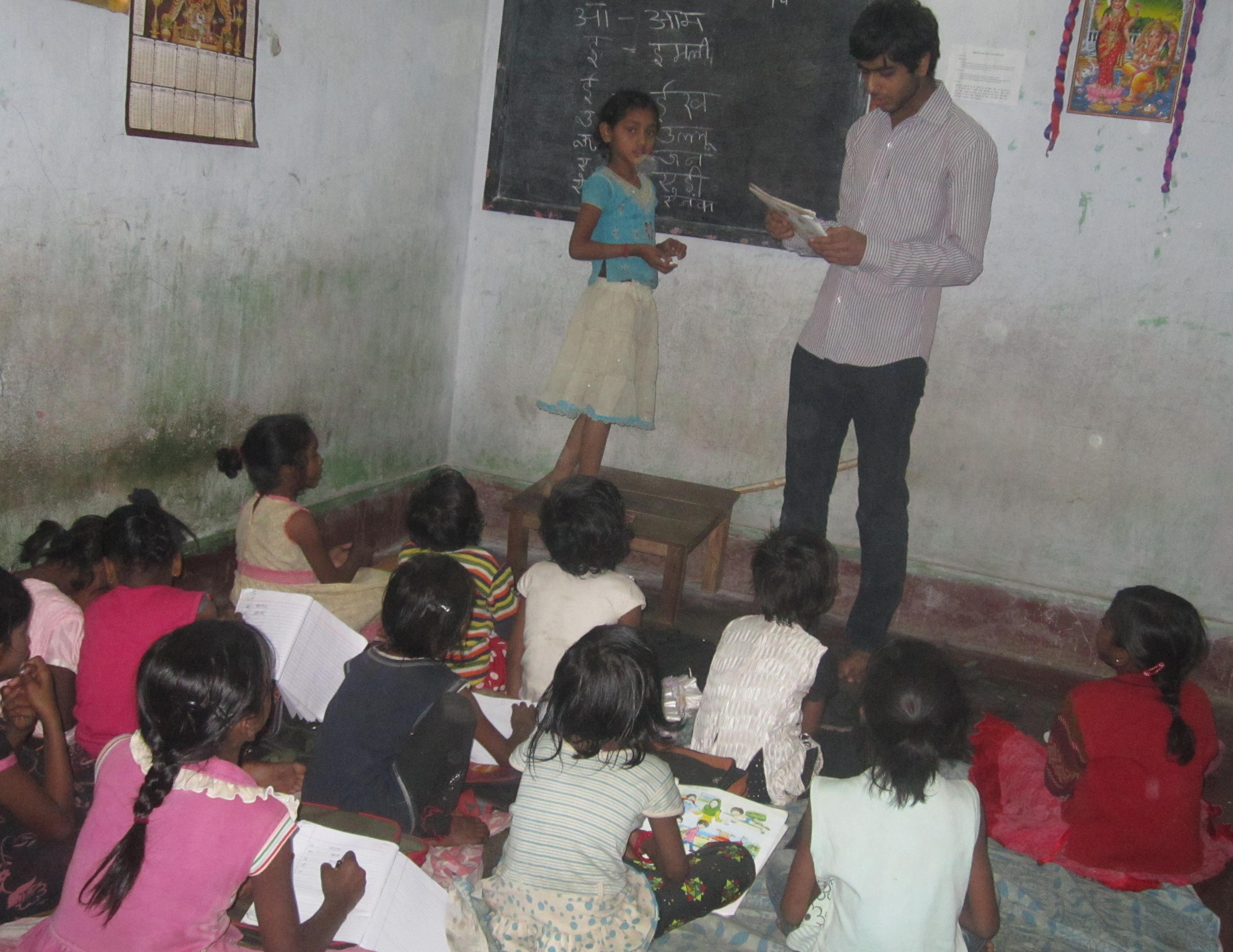

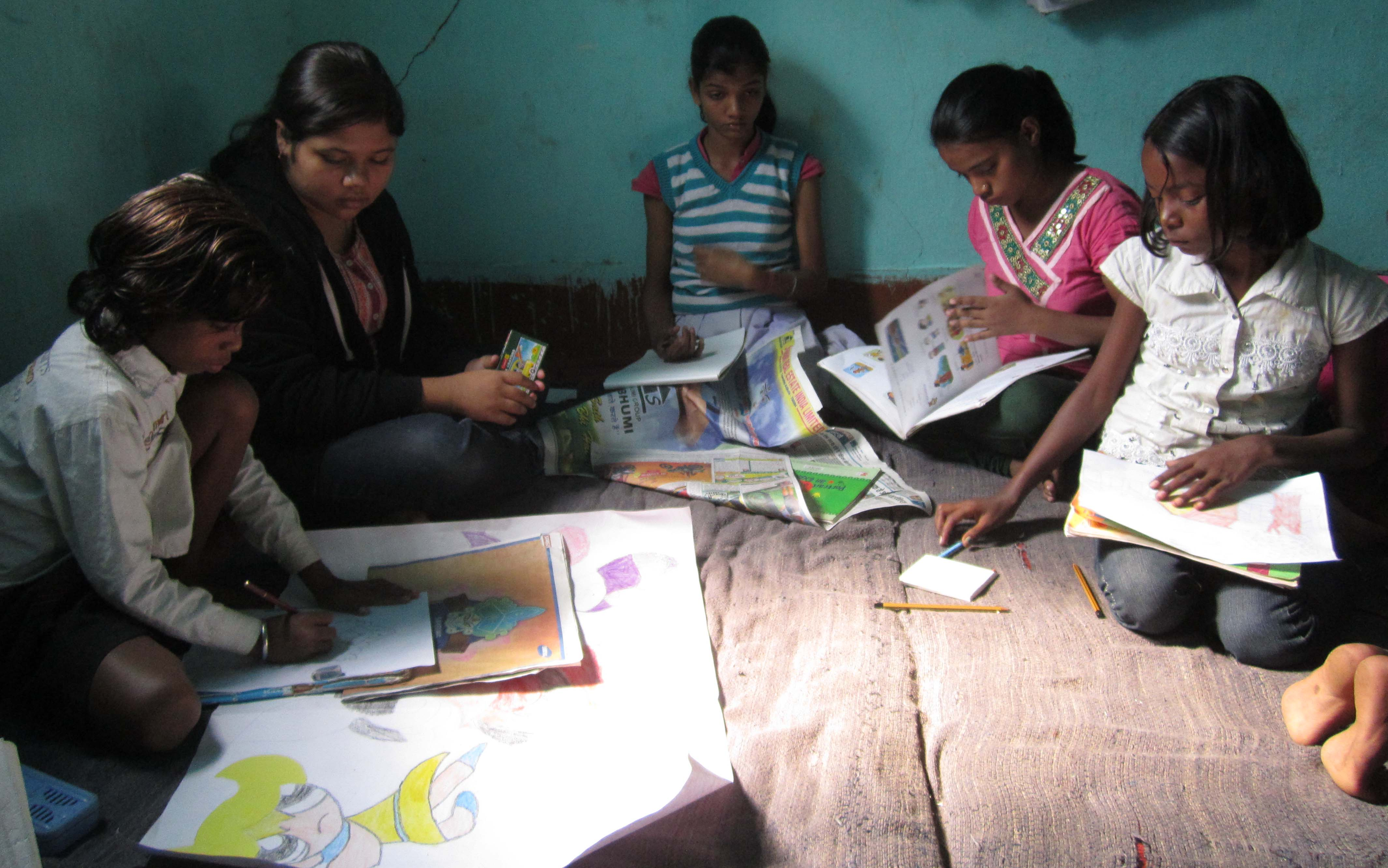

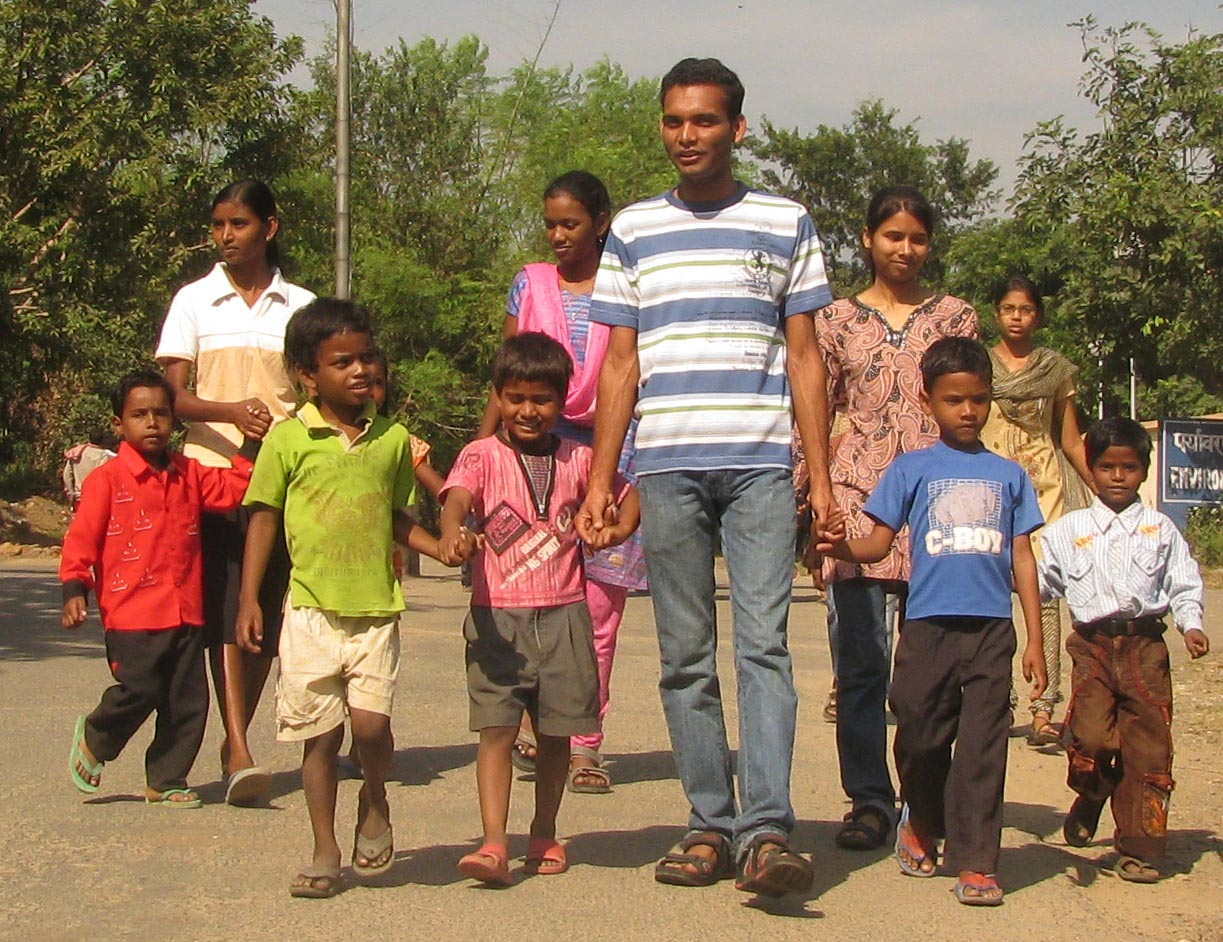

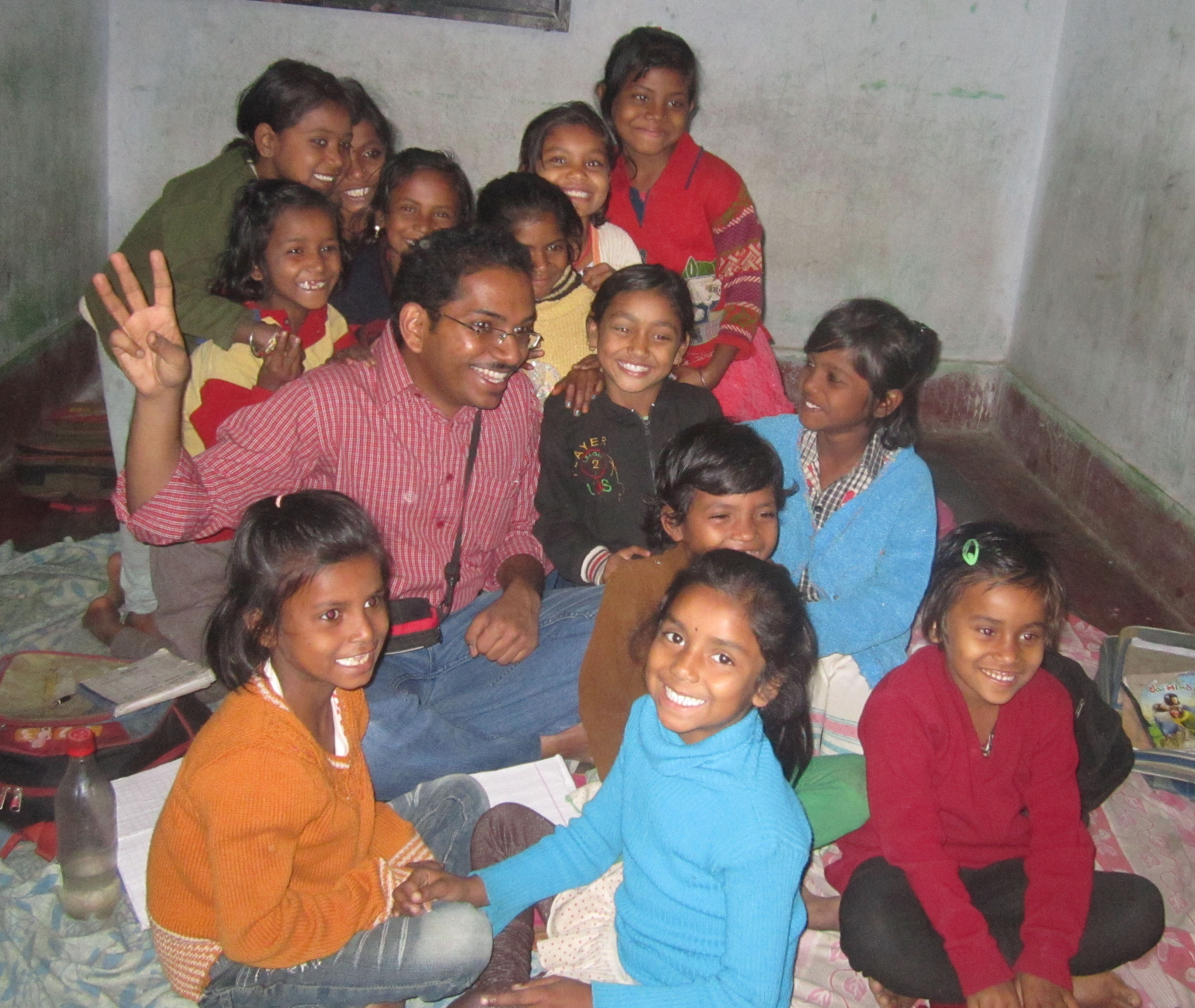

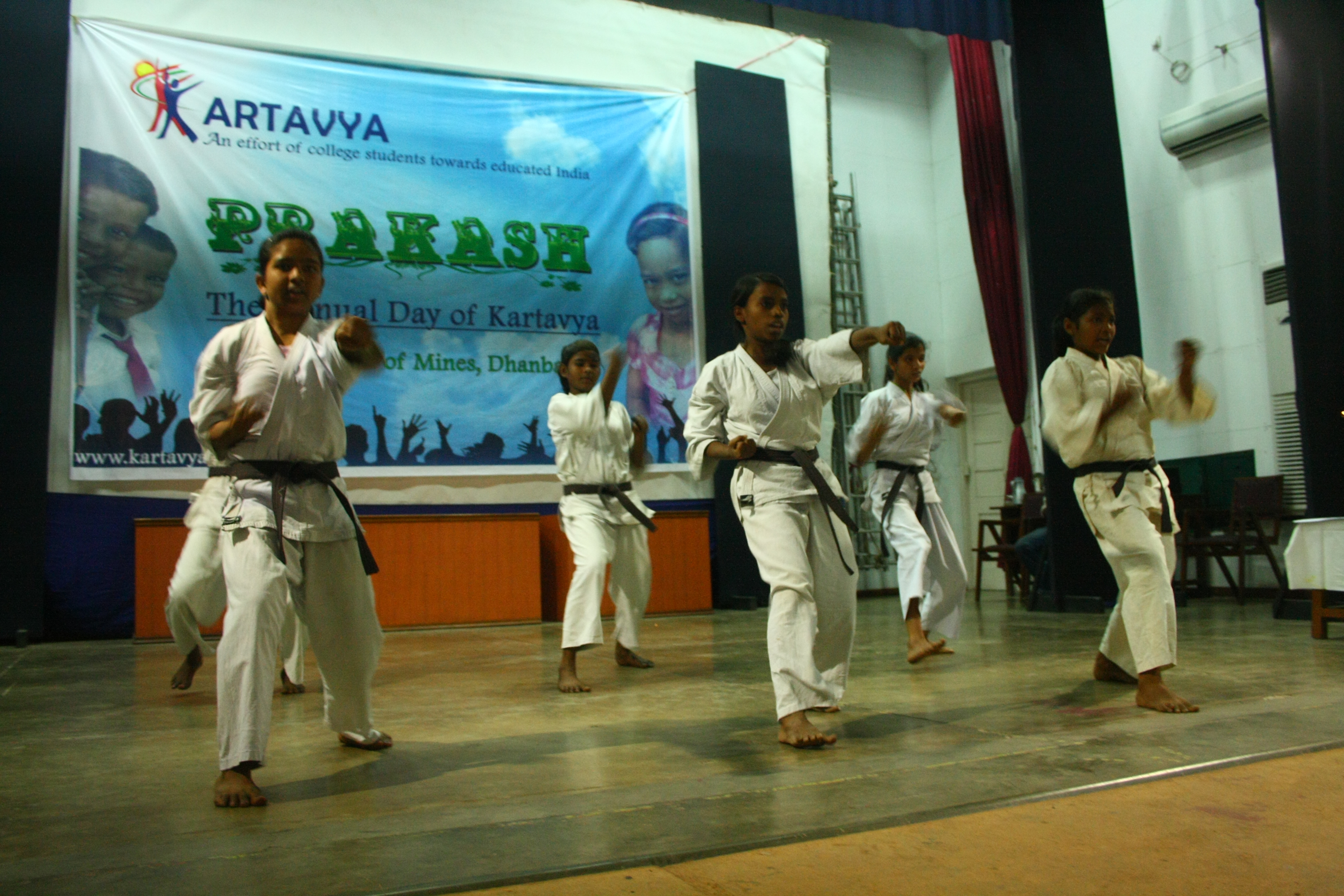
PRAKASH - The Annual Day of KARTAVYA

=== Health ===
The Health team attempts to protect children from otherwise unhealthy surroundings. People are made aware about the health habits and clean environments. Also, a regular medical camp is organized to identify any disease outbreaks.

=== Vocational training and women's empowerment ===
Kartavya is determined to eradicate social and economic gaps from society. This can be achieved by enhancing the poor's living standard. Vocational training equips destitute people (especially females) with practical day-to-day skills which make them economically independent and self-reliant. Women's empowerment is considered a recipe to balance the equation of social inequalities. It is done by making women aware about their rights and responsibilities. This is inculcated through education.

=== Saheli ===
"Saheli" is the project of Rotary Club, Dhanbad extended to Kartavya Dhanbad Chapter. This project is to train women in skills such as sewing, hand knitting, painting etc. Rotary Club has given financial aid for this project, including computers and sewing machines. The program serves about 30 women.

== Achievements ==
- In a unique survey in 2012 kartavya got 16th position in world's top 20 successful nonprofits started by students.
- Two Kartavya students (Sunita and Chandan) cleared Navodaya entrance examination in 2012.
- Kartavya Karate team participated in 18th Chhotanagpur Karate Championship held in Doon Public School, Dhanbad on 21–22 January 2012.
- 12 Kartavya students participated in the 19th National THANG-THA Championship held in Jammu & Kashmir in this September 2012. Abhya Kumari won gold medal and Sarita Kumari won silver medal.
- Prathmik Vidyalaya in NCC Colony near ISM again got new life with involvement of Kartavya in 2012.
- Kartavya was successful in treating various people in Bastis (dwellings) suffering from cataracts and the organization is taking care of a student who is at last stage of TB.
- Kartavya Karate team participated in Dhanbad District Karate Championship on “The K Day” held in Doon Public School on 7 October 2012.
- Sarita Kumari got the prize from Dhanbad Olympics Association for her excellent performance in Karate in 2012.
- 5 Students participated in Kolkata National Karate Championship 2012 in November.
