= Constitution Club of India =

- Constitution Club Of India, Vitthal Bhai Patel House, Rafi Marg
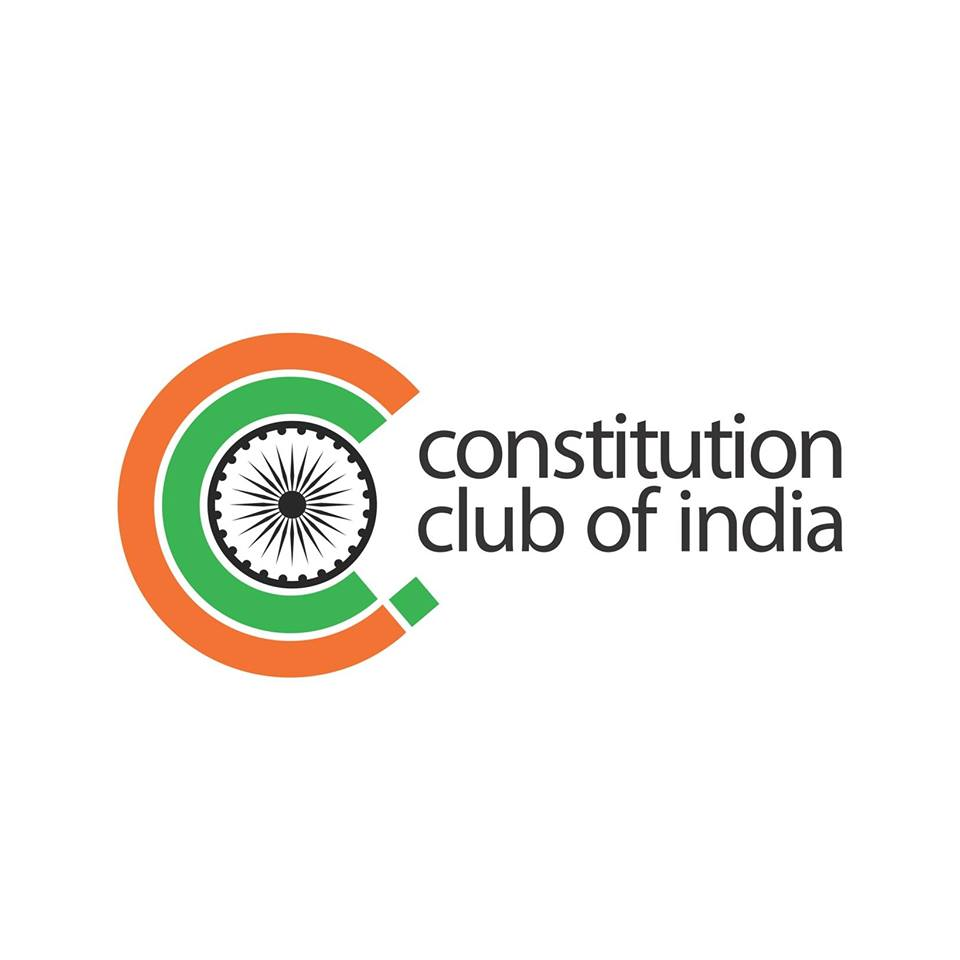
- Interactive map of the Constitution Club of India area

General information
- Location: New Delhi, India
- Coordinates: 28.620395°N 77.213404°E
- Construction started: February 1947

Other information
- Seating capacity: 700

Website
- constitutionclub.in

References
- http://constitutionclub.in/memorandom.php

Constitution Club of India is a club started for members of Constituent Assembly of India. In present days the Constitution Club acts as a platform for interaction amongst the past and present Members of Parliament. The club is registered under the Societies Registration Act 1860.

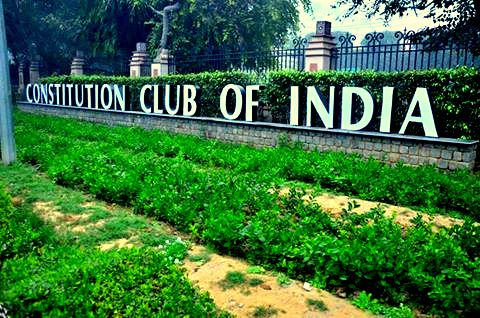
Constitution Club Of India Entrance

== History ==
The club was established as an informal group in year 1947 housed at Curzon Road. It was formally inaugurated by then President of India Sarvapalli Radhakrishnan, in February 1965. At the present location Constitution Club of India is next to the Vithal Bhai Patel House in Delhi.

== Memorandum ==
The Constitution Club of India was established in February 1947 to promote social interaction and provide members of the Indian Constituent Assembly with the facilities and amenities of a club. Over the years, it has grown into a forum where past and present Members of Parliament can meet, interact, and exchange ideas. To further its aims and objectives, it was decided to establish a formal society under the name “Constitution Club of India” and register it under the Societies Registration Act, 1860.

== After independence ==
After the Independence, the Club has emerged as a platform for exhibitions, vital meetings, events, press conferences, elite parties & social hangouts between the present and former Members of Parliament.

== President, Vice President and Governing Council ==
=== President, Vice President and General Secretary ===
Om Birla, Speaker of the Lok Sabha is current President. Manohar Lal Khattar, Minister of Housing and Urban Affairs is Vice President. Harivansh Narayan Singh, Deputy Chairperson of the Rajya Sabha is General Secretary.

=== Elected Governing Council ===
Rajiv Pratap Rudy as Secretary (Administration), Rajeev Shukla as Secretary (Sports), Tiruchi N. Siva as Secretary (Culture), A. P. Jithender Reddy as Treasurer.

The other Executive Members of the Club are Naresh Agarwal, Prasun Banerjee, Shrirang Appa Barne, Kalikesh Narayan Singh Deo, Pradeep Gandhi, Jasbir Singh Gill, Deepender Singh Hooda, Naveen Jindal, N. K. Premachandran, Pradip Kumar Varma, Akshay Yadav.

== Facilities ==
- Conference Rooms
- Coffee Shop
- Billiards Room
- Gym
- Unisex Salon
- Swimming Pool
- Badminton Hall
- Cosy Leisure Lounges
