= Kartavya (2026 film) =

2026 Indian film by Pulkit

- Official release poster
- Directed by: Pulkit
- Written by: Pulkit
- Produced by: Gauri Khan
- Starring: Saif Ali Khan; Rasika Dugal; Sanjay Mishra; Zakir Hussain
- Cinematography: Anil Mehta
- Edited by: Zubin Sheikh
- Music by: Anurag Saikia
- Production company: Red Chillies Entertainment
- Distributed by: Netflix
- Release date: 15 May 2026
- Running time: 108 minutes
- Country: India
- Language: Hindi

Kartavya (transl. Duty) is a 2026 Indian Hindi-language crime drama film written and directed by Pulkit. The film is produced by Gauri Khan under the banner Red Chillies Entertainment. It stars Saif Ali Khan, Rasika Dugal, Sanjay Mishra, Zakir Hussain with Saurabh Dwivedi in a special appearance. The film was officially announced on 3 February 2026 by Netflix. It was released on 15 May 2026.

== Plot ==
Inspector Pawan Malik is a Police inspector in the fictional small town of Jhamli who one day is deputed to provide security to a journalist. While escorting the journalist who is in a separate vehicle, they are intercepted by two bike-borne shooters. In the ensuing shootout, the journalist and one of the shooters is killed, and the other shooter escapes while Ashok, Pawan's subordinate is shot in the arm. Investigations reveal that the escaped shooter is a 16 year old boy Harpal, who has been told to carry out the shooting by one Anand Shri, a local spiritual guru. Anand Shri's men try to silence Harpal, to prevent him from revealing the journalist's murder plot to the police, but he manages to evade them. After the police arrest Harpal, Pawan realises he's just a child and a pawn, and takes pity on him. He promises Harpal that he'll keep him safe.

Meanwhile, Pawan’s brother Deepak, who is in love with Preeti, a woman from a different caste, elopes with her and secretly marries her because both their families oppose their inter-caste relationship. This angers both the fathers as well as the village panchayat who decide to carry out honour killings of Deepak and Preeti. Pawan takes Deepak and Preeti to a safehouse, telling them to lie low for a few days before disappearing.

The plot revolves around whether Pawan will be able to keep Harpal, and his brother Deepak and his wife Preeti safe. But eventually he fails to do any of that due to Ashok's betrayal.

== Cast ==
- Saif Ali Khan as Inspector Pawan Malik
- Rasika Dugal as Varsha Malik, Pawan's wife
- Sanjay Mishra as Ashok Y
- Zakir Hussain as Harihar Malik, Pawan and Deepak's father
- Saurabh Dwivedi as Anand Shri (special appearance)
- Manish Chaudhari as Superintendent of Police Keshav
- Yudhvir Ahlawat as Harpal
- Saharsh Kumar Shukla as Nirmal
- Swastik Bhagat as Honey
- Saurabh Abrol as Deepak Malik, Pawan's younger brother
- Suraksha Gaire as Preeti, Deepak's wife
- Sanjay Taneja as Sarpanch
- Durgesh Kumar as Amar
- Anil Saini as Damodar
- Radhika Chauhan as Reema Dutta
- Anoop Sharma as Beni Prasad

== Release ==
Kartavya began streaming on Netflix from 15 May 2026.

== Reception ==
On the review aggregator website Rotten Tomatoes, 25% of 12 critics' reviews are positive, with an average rating of 4.9/10.

Shubhra Gupta of The Indian Express gave 1.5 stars out of 5 and writes that "Despite heavyweights like Saif Ali Khan, Rasika Duggal and Sanjay Mishra in the Netflix film, it comes undone due to lazy, formulaic writing." Rahul Desai of The Hollywood Reporter India feels that it has "Pride, Prejudice and Plenty of Spine". Tanisha Bhattacharya writing for NDTV rated it 3/5 stars and said that the film was "taut, gritty and keeps you hooked. The real twists come from the understated characters". Anuj Kumar of The Hindu observed that "A heartland noir that calculates the cost of conscience, Kartavya struggles under the weight of structural sanitisation, a flattened antagonist, and misplaced star service." Nandini Ramnath of Scroll.in said that "At least Kartavya has the good sense to wrap up in 108 minutes. There's nothing more to say or show in a movie that's utterly predictable and bereft of feeling."

Rishabh Suri of Hindustan Times rated it 2.5/5 stars and called that it "feels like a film that had all the right ideas, but didn't find the emotional depth to bring them alive. It's commentary on caste and honour killings remains relevant, and parts of the investigation keep you mildly engaged." Sukanya Verma of Rediff.com gave 2 stars out of 5 and said that "Plot loopholes, unresolved arcs and feeble explanations for sudden betrayals, Kartavya's hastily-wrapped conclusions and gabby excuses makes it look like a demo reel for an OTT series." Sana Farzeen of India Today gave 3 stars out of 5 and said that "The film's ideas land, but its soft-edged execution blunts the force of its anger." Devesh Sharma of Filmfare rated it 3.5/5 stars and writes that "Despite its gripping atmosphere, strong performances and morally complex protagonist, the film leaves behind the feeling of unrealised potential." Lachmi Deb Roy of Firstpost gave 3.5 stars out of 5 and said that "Everything said and done, the ending is debatable, and that’s what makes Netflix’s Kartavya a must-watch. Despite the slow pace, this caste-crime thriller is consistently gripping."
