= Nikah halala =

Islamic marriage practice

Nikah halala (Urdu: نکاح حلالہ), also known as tahleel marriage, is a practice in which a woman, after being divorced by her husband by triple talaq, marries another man, consummates the marriage, and gets divorced again in order to be able to remarry her former husband. Nikah means marriage and halala means to make something halal, or permissible. This form of marriage is haram (forbidden), according to the hadith of Islamic prophet Muhammad. Nikah halala is practiced by a small minority of Muslims, mainly in countries that recognise the triple talaq.

== Islamic law ==
In classical Islamic law, a husband may divorce by simply announcing to his wife that he refuses to accept her (talaq). The initial declaration of talaq is a revocable repudiation (ṭalāq rajʿah) which does not terminate the marriage. The husband can revoke the divorce at any time during the waiting period ('iddah) which lasts three full menstrual cycles. Resumption of sexual relations automatically retracts the repudiation. The divorce becomes final when the waiting period expires. This is called a "minor" divorce (al-baynuna al-sughra) and the couple can remarry. If the husband repudiates his wife for the third time, it triggers a "major" divorce (al-baynuna al-kubra), after which the couple cannot remarry without an intervening consummated marriage by the wife to another man. This is known as tahlil marriage or nikah halala. Making the third pronouncement irrevocable acts as a deterrent to rash repudiations.

There are hadith indicating that entering a tahleel marriage with the intention of divorcing so that the original spouses can remarry is forbidden (haraam) in Islam. Hadith in Abu Dawood and Ibn Majah reported that both the first husband (muhallil) and the temporary husband (muhallil lahu) were cursed by God, and Ibn Majah calls the temporary husband "a borrowed billy-goat." Al-Hakim Nishapuri adds that marriage should be based on genuine intentions, and that in the time of Muhammad, tahleel spouses would have been considered adulterers.

== Practice in different countries ==
=== India ===
Petitions against nikah halala have been filed in the Supreme Court of India against by women's rights organisations such as Bharatiya Muslim Mahila Andolan. In March 2018, the Supreme Court issued notice to the Indian government on the issue of nikah halala and polygamy. The Indian government made its stand clear in favor of criminalizing the practice of nikah halala in apex court.

The Supreme Court of India heard the petition against nikah halala and polygamy in Muslim communities on July 20, 2018. On September 13, 2018, one of the petitioners, a Muslim woman named Shabnam Rani was attacked with acid. Islamic radicals were the main suspects. On September 18, 2018 the Supreme Court asked the government to provide adequate security to the victim.

The All India Muslim Personal Law Board is against the outlawing of nikah halala, though it states that it should be discouraged and restricted to the "rarest of rare situations."

Lawyer and BJP leader Ashwini Upadhyay filed a writ petition in the Supreme Court against nikah halala and polygamy as violations of fundamental right to life and liberty.

=== Iran ===
Nikah halala and triple talaq are practiced among the Kurdish Sunni community of Iran. There has been pushback from women's rights activists, lawyers and human rights activists.

=== Pakistan ===
Nikah halala is prevalent in Pakistan, where, increasingly, commercial "halala centres" facilitate halala marriages. A number of public figures have spoken against the practice.

=== United Kingdom ===
A BBC report found that halala is practised in certain Pakistani Muslim communities in the UK. The report uncovered many instances where women were socially and sexually exploited by local religious figures.

== In popular culture ==
- Nikah Halala, 1971 Iranian film
- Nikah, 1982 Hindi-language Indian film
- Mister Come Tomorrow, 2015 Hindi-language Indian short film
- Hatheli, 2016 Pakistani Urdu-language TV series
- Halal, 2017 Marathi-language Indian film
- Ram Ki Janmabhoomi, 2018 Hindi-language Indian film
- Mann Jogi, a Pakistani television miniseries that explores the exploitation of Nikah Halala by individuals for personal gain

== See also ==
- Divorce in Islam
- Islamic view of marriage
- Muslim Personal Law in India
- Nikah misyar
- Nikah mut'ah

== Bibliography ==
- Salim, Arskal. Contemporary Islamic Law in Indonesia: Sharia and Legal Pluralism. United Kingdom, Edinburgh University Press, 2015.
- Bakabuang Phenomenon in Minangkabay Society: A Covert Human Trafficking Action ~ Nelmawarni Nelmawarni Kafaah Journal of Gender Studies Volume 11 No. 2 (2021)
