= Elgin Academy (Elgin, Illinois) =

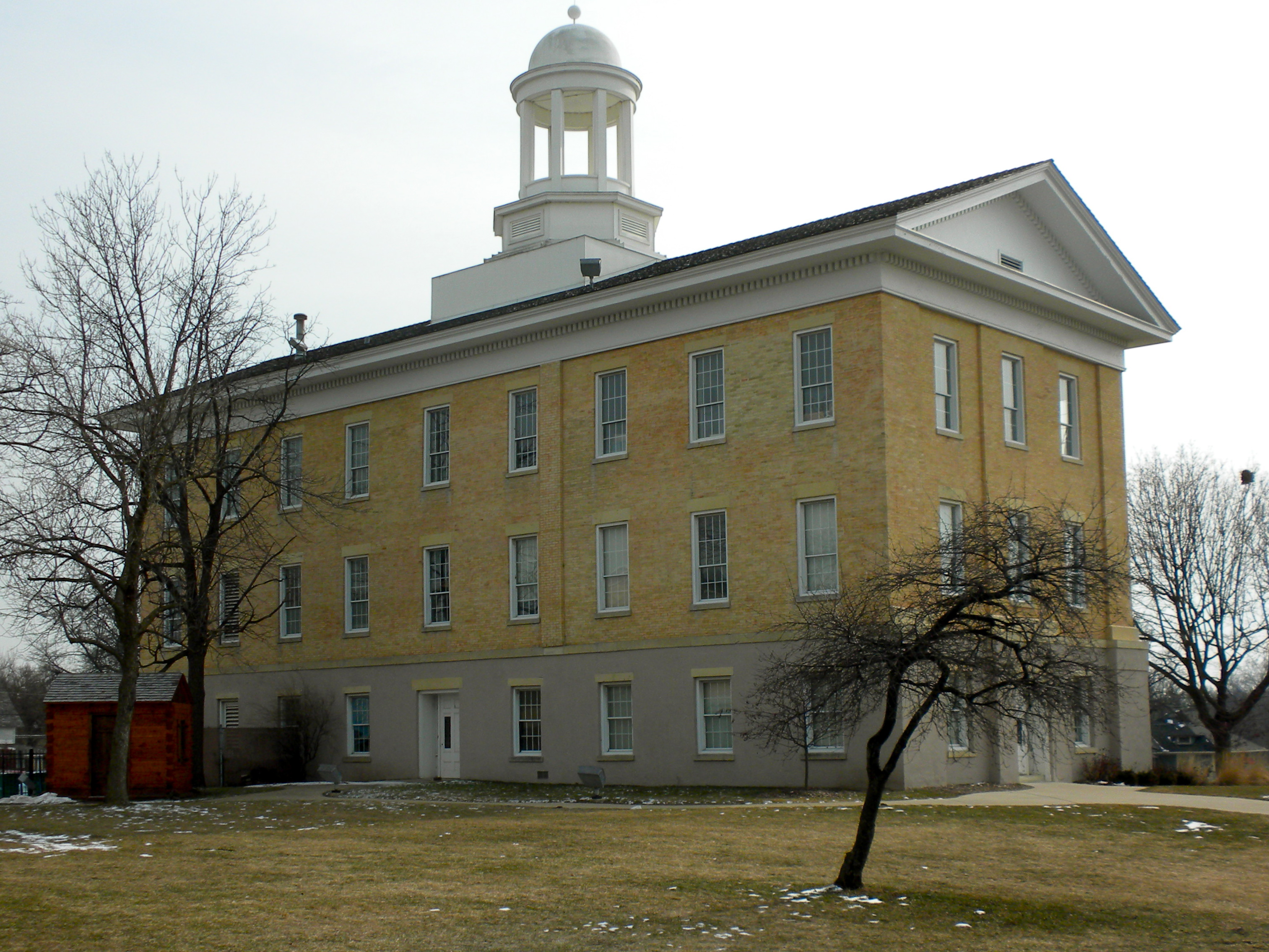
- Elgin, Illinois; United States

Information
- Type: Private, independent
- Motto: Taking Learning Personally
- Established: 1839; 187 years ago
- Closed: 2024
- Grades: Preschool-12
- Mascot: Foxman
- Team name: Hilltoppers
- Website: elginacademy.org

- Elgin Academy
- U.S. National Register of Historic Places
- U.S. Historic district – Contributing property
- Location within Illinois Location within the United States
- Location: 350 Park St., Elgin, Illinois
- Coordinates: 42°2′29″N 88°16′40″W
- Area: 0.3 acres (0.12 ha)
- Built: 1855; 171 years ago
- Architect: Quigley, James; Reeves, Edwin F.
- Architectural style: Greek Revival
- NRHP reference No.: 76000713
- Added to NRHP: October 08, 1976

Elgin Academy was an independent, coeducational, college-preparatory school in Elgin, Illinois, United States. Elgin Academy was notable for many accomplishments, such as its Scholastic Bowl and ACES teams.

== History ==
The academy was established by charter of the Illinois General Assembly in 1839 to provide students with a classical education. The academy's original building, Old Main, was constructed in 1855-6, and is on the United States' National Register of Historic Places. It now serves as a museum of the Elgin Area Historical Society.

The original charter was granted by the Illinois legislature and signed in 1839, only four years after the founding of Elgin. The academy opened, and has continued, with a non-denominational and coeducational policy. In 1856 the first building, Old Main, was completed at a cost of $19,000 and opened for classes, but the first diploma was not awarded until 1872 when Laura Davidson, the granddaughter of James Gifford, Elgin's founder, earned the honor. Davidson later married Nathaniel Sears and their family became major donors to the academy.

During the American Civil War seven commissioned officers, six non-commissioned officers, and 21 privates served from the academy. All together, 153 Civil War veterans, whose names are inscribed on the base of two authentic Union cannons, were associated with the academy. These include William Francis Lynch, who served as a colonel during the war and was later promoted to brigadier general.

In 1874, 274 students were enrolled and high school degrees were offered in the areas of College Preparatory, Normal, English, Classical, Latin-Scientific, and Business. By 1900 the football team, basketball team, and a school newspaper were established. About this time the academy became briefly associated with the University of Chicago and then with Northwestern University from 1903 to 1927 and from 1932 to 1943. The Sears family helped build the academy's first gymnasium in 1918. A boarding program ran from 1920 to 1987, with girls allowed to board starting in 1941.

The Sears family helped build the Sears Art Gallery in 1924 and Sears Hall in 1940. The new gymnasium was built in 1958, North Hall was built as a girls' dormitory in 1962, and Edwards Hall was built in 1969. Old Main was closed in 1972.

Enrollment fell to 85 students in 1973, but rose to 425 in 2012. In 1984 the program was expanded to K-12, and preschool was added in 1997. The Harold D. Rider Family Media, Science, and Fine Arts Center opened in 2008.

Enrollment fell back down to 200 in 2023, and on November 7, 2023, the school officially announced its planned closing. The school closed at the end of the 2023-2024 school year after graduating its final class of 19 seniors.

On August 30, 2024, the campus was acquired by Burhan Academy, a new K-12 Islamic school.

== Facilities ==
The school occupied a 18-acre (73,000 m^{2}) campus 35 miles (56 km) northwest of Chicago in the Historic District of the city of Elgin. The school's classrooms were largely housed in four buildings:

- The Harold D. Rider Family Media, Science and Fine Arts Center housed the Kimball Street Theatre and part of the Liautaud-Lyons Upper School program, partially donated by the philanthropic James "Jimmy John" Liautaud.
- Edwards Hall housed the Liautaud-Lyons Upper School program.
- Sears Hall housed the Middle School program.
- North Hall housed the Early Childhood and Lower School programs.

Other buildings on campus included:

- Sears Gallery
- The Gymnasium
- Raymond House (business office)
- Penney House (admissions, marketing, development and alumni relations offices)
- Old Main (the Elgin Area Historical Society and one classroom used daily by the academy)

A sports field complex, approximately one half-mile away from the main campus, included tennis courts, grass fields, and 1/5-mile all-weather track.

=== Old Main ===
Old Main was the academy's original building. Rather than restore it in the early 1970s, the academy sold it to the city of Elgin for $1. Today, it is used as the museum for the Elgin Area Historical Society. One room served as a regular school classroom for the school.

== The Academy ==
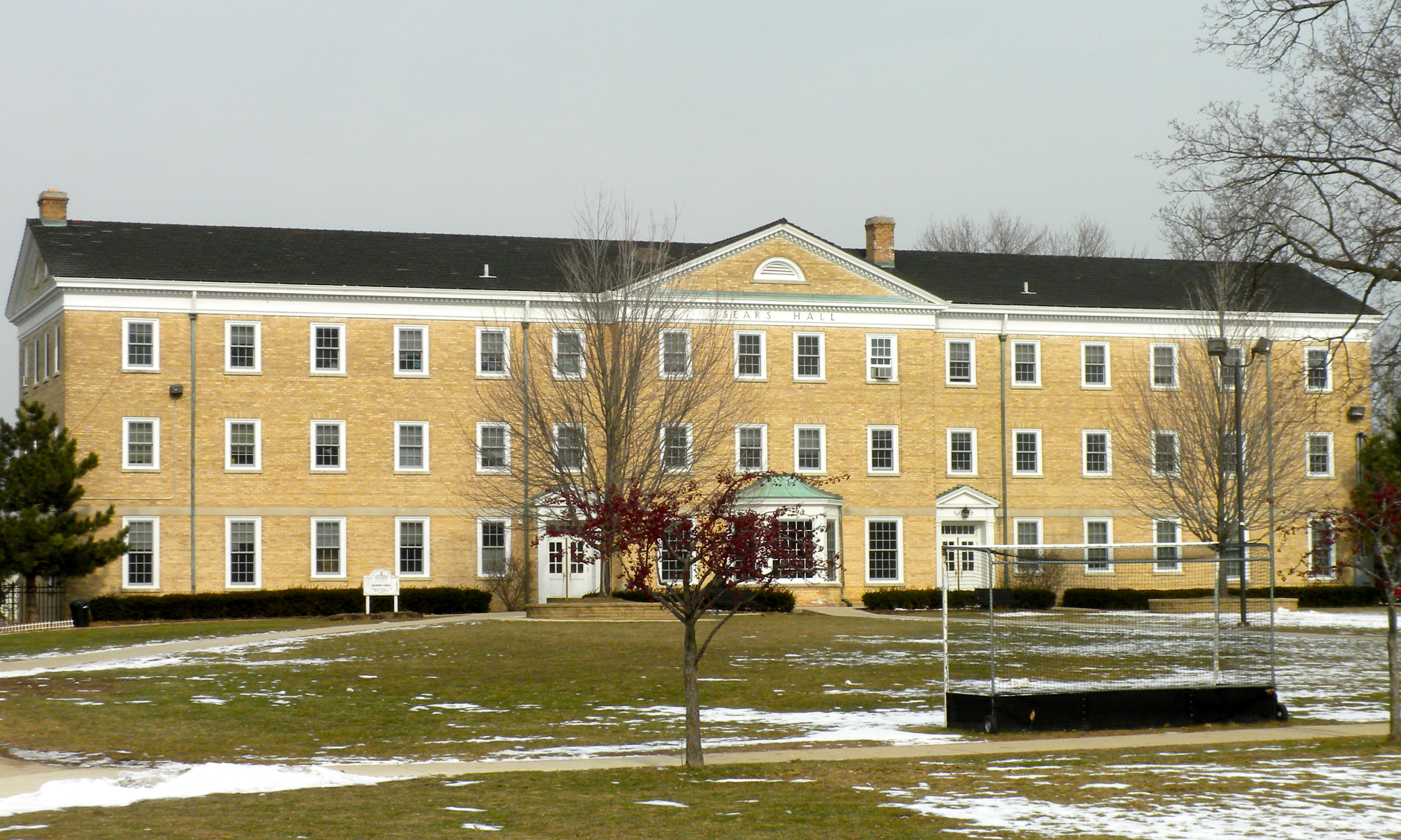
Sears Hall

The academy offered an academic, college-preparatory curriculum. It was a member of the National Association of Independent Schools and was accredited by both the Independent Schools Association of the Central States and the AdvancEd commission. The school was a member of the Lake Michigan Association of Independent Schools, the Illinois Coalition of Nonpublic Schools, the Cum Laude Society, the National Honor Society, and many other academic organizations. It was recognized by the Illinois Non-Public Schools Recognition Program.

=== Athletics ===
Elgin Academy's sports teams were nicknamed the Hilltoppers (the school being built on a hill), and their mascot was Foxman, after the nearby Fox River. Basketball, soccer, track, cross country, golf, tennis, volleyball, and baseball were offered. The school's sports affiliations included the Illinois High School Association, the Illinois Council of Private Schools, and the Independent School League.

=== Notable Achievements ===
Academic:

- Worldwide Youth in Science and Engineering (WYSE) State Champions
- Scholastic Bowl State Champions (2022 Masonic State 1A)
- Scholastic Bowl Nationals 11th Place (2022 NAQT SSNCT)
- Nationally Recognized Model UN Team

Athletic:

- IHSA Regional Basketball Champions, 1983
- 1983 Chicago Tribune basketball state power rankings as # 10 best in Illinois.
- Soccer Regional Champions, 2016
- Cross Country Sectional Qualifiers, 2017
- Baseball 3x ISL Champions (2017-2019) and 4x Regional Champions (2016-2019)
- 2022 Tennis Doubles State Champions
- 2023 Tennis Singles State Champion
