= Marriage in Pakistan =

Tradition in Pakistan

Marriage in Pakistan

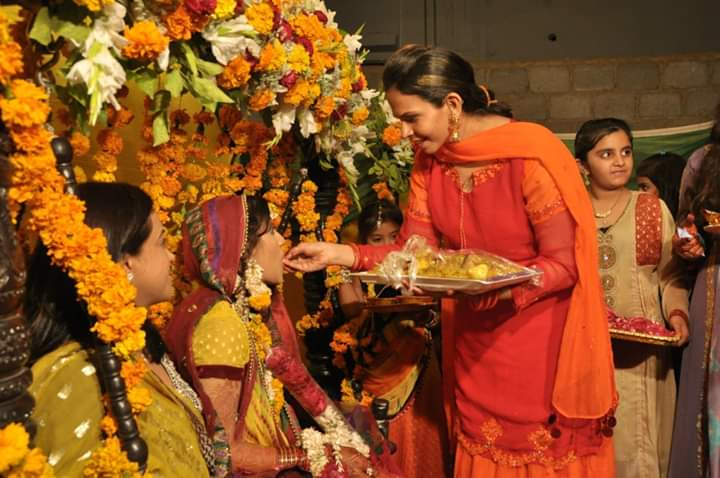
Mehndi

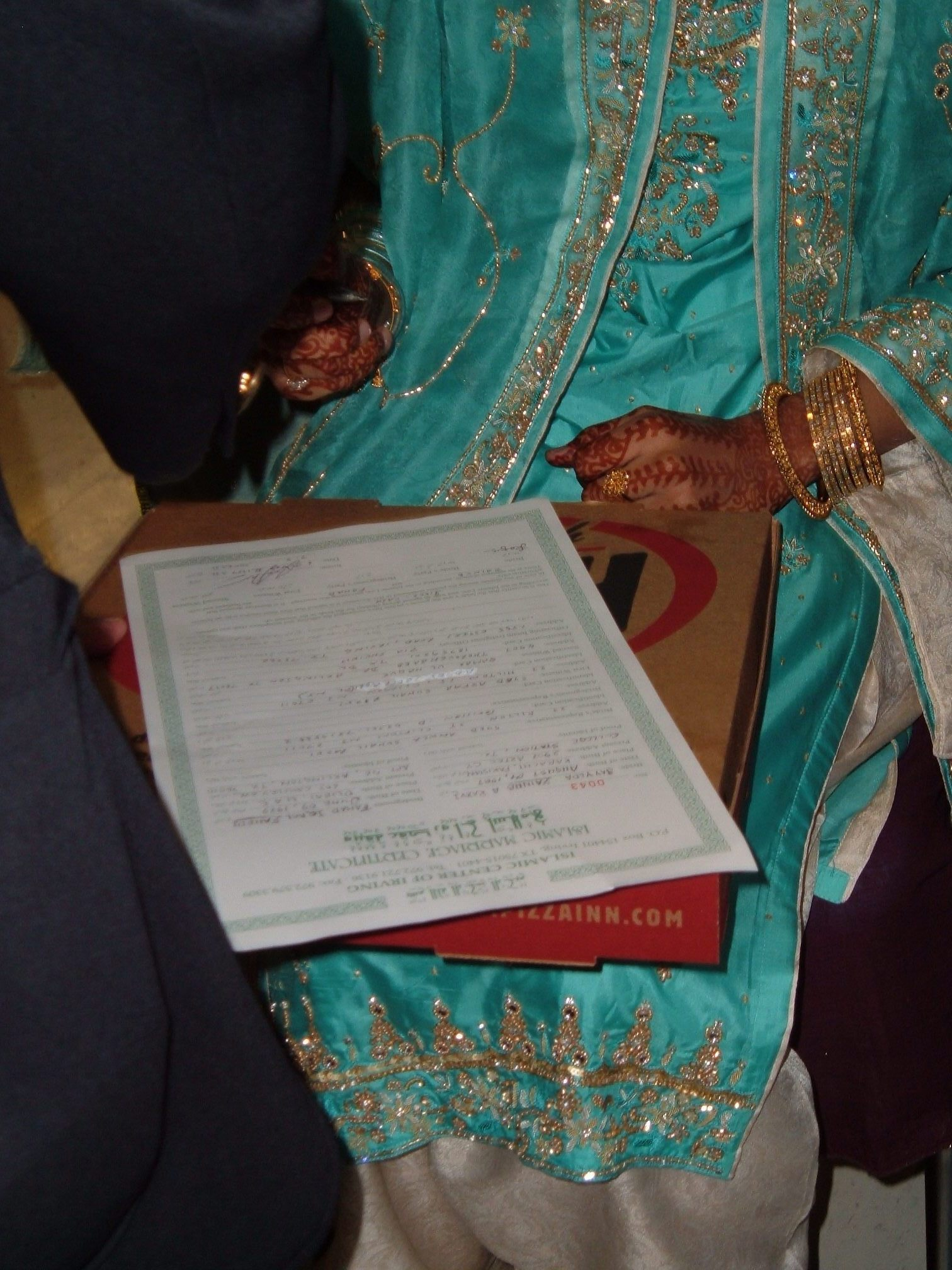
Nikah

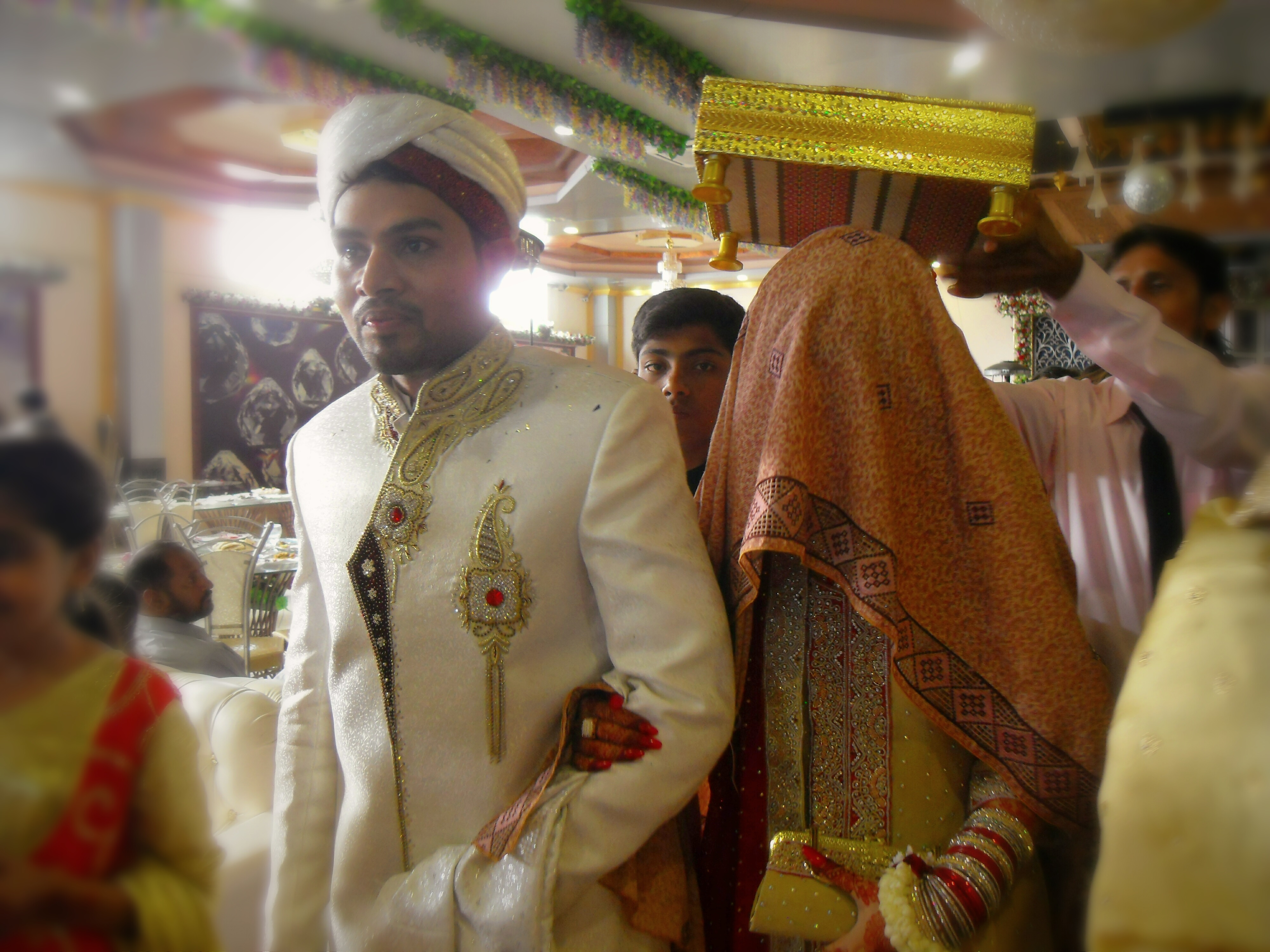
Rukhsati

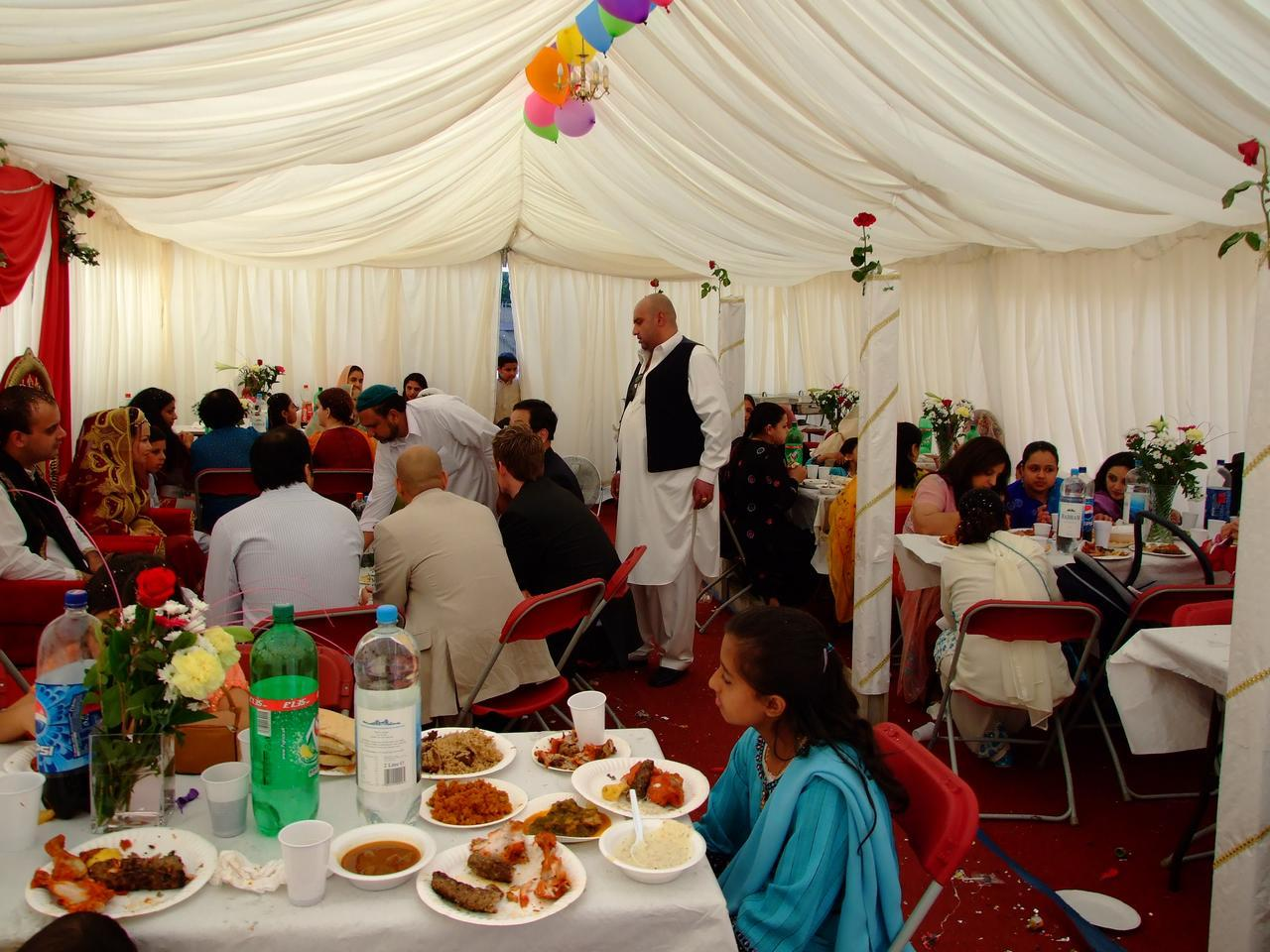
Families and friends are usually seated in a large hall during the ceremony

Marriage in Pakistan (Urdu: پاکستانی شادی Pākistānī Śādī) pertains to wedding traditions established and adhered to by Pakistani men and women. Despite their local and regional variations, marriages in Pakistan generally follow Islamic marital jurisprudence. Marriages are not only seen as a union between a husband and a wife, but also an alliance between their respective families. These traditions extend to other countries around in the world where Overseas Pakistani communities exist.

== Legal ==
On 26 January 2026, the Supreme Court of Pakistan has clarified that a man may face criminal and civil charges if he enters into a second marriage without the agreement of his first wife or the Arbitration Council's approval. The decision resulted from a petition that Naila Javed filed to have her marriage dissolved after her husband remarried without getting her written agreement or the necessary Arbitration Council approval. The Supreme Court overturned the previous rulings of the Peshawar High Court and the family court and ordered the husband to pay Rs. 1.2 million as mahr in a five-page ruling written by Justice Musarrat Hilali. The Muslim Family Laws Ordinance and the Dissolution of Muslim Marriages Act, according to the Supreme Court, give a woman the ability to file for annulment if her husband gets married again without her permission. The court emphasized that without the wife's free consent, a court cannot arbitrarily turn a divorce petition into a khula (judicial divorce).

== Before the wedding ==
=== Search ===
Searching for a potential groom or bride (رشتہ تلاش کرنا) is the first step of traditional Pakistani marriages. Beyond age 20, both men and women are considered potential grooms and brides. Most marriages in Pakistan are traditional arranged marriages, semi-arranged marriages or love marriages.

- Arranged marriage occurs when a member of the family, a close friend or a third person party helps bring two supposedly compatible people together in matrimony. The groom and bride have usually never met before, and any interaction between them is akin to small talk with a stranger. This form of marriage is considered traditional, but is losing popularity among the newer generations.
- Semi-arranged marriage is a growing trend where both men and women interact with one another before marriage. Both the man and woman have usually had several "meet and greet" opportunities, thereby allowing both to gain a sense of familiarity. This process can occur over a span of a few months to a few years and may or may not culminate in marriage. However, if both agree upon marriage, the potential groom will approach his family to send a proposal to the family of the potential bride.
- Love marriages (also known as court marriages) are rare, since the concept of "family consent" has been eliminated. Such "free-will" challenges traditional mindsets as it "dishonours" the powerful institution in Pakistani society - the family. Without family consent, marriages are usually frowned upon.

=== Proposals ===
Once a decision has been made by either the man or woman or both, one or more representatives of the potential groom's family pay a visit to the potential bride's family. In arranged marriages, the first visit is purely for the parties to become acquainted with one another and does not include a formal proposal. Following the first visit, both the man and woman have their say in whether or not they would like a follow-up to this visit. Once both parties are in agreement, a proposal party (شادی کا پیام) is held at the bride's home, where the groom's parents and family elders formally ask the bride's parents for her hand in marriage. In semi-arranged marriages, the first or second visit may include a formal proposal, since both the man and woman have already agreed to marriage prior - the proposal is more or less a formality. In love marriages, the man directly proposes to the woman. Once the wedding proposal is accepted, beverages and refreshments are served. Depending on individual family traditions, the bride-to-be may also be presented with gifts such as jewelry and a variety of gifts. Some religious families may also recite Surah Al-Fatihah.

=== Engagement ===
An engagement (called nisbat نِسبت, mangni منگنی or habar bandi حبر بندی) is a formal ceremony to mark the engagement of the couple. It is usually a small ceremony that takes place in the presence of a few close members of the would-be bride's and groom's families. Rings and other items of jewelry among affluent families are exchanged between the would-be bride and groom. In traditional engagement ceremonies, the bride and the groom are not seated together, and the rings are placed on the bride's finger by the groom's mother or sister, and vice versa. However, segregated engagement ceremonies have become a rarity among the newer generations and rings are usually exchanged between the couple. A prayer (Dua) and blessings are then recited for the couple, and the wedding date is decided.

== Wedding ==
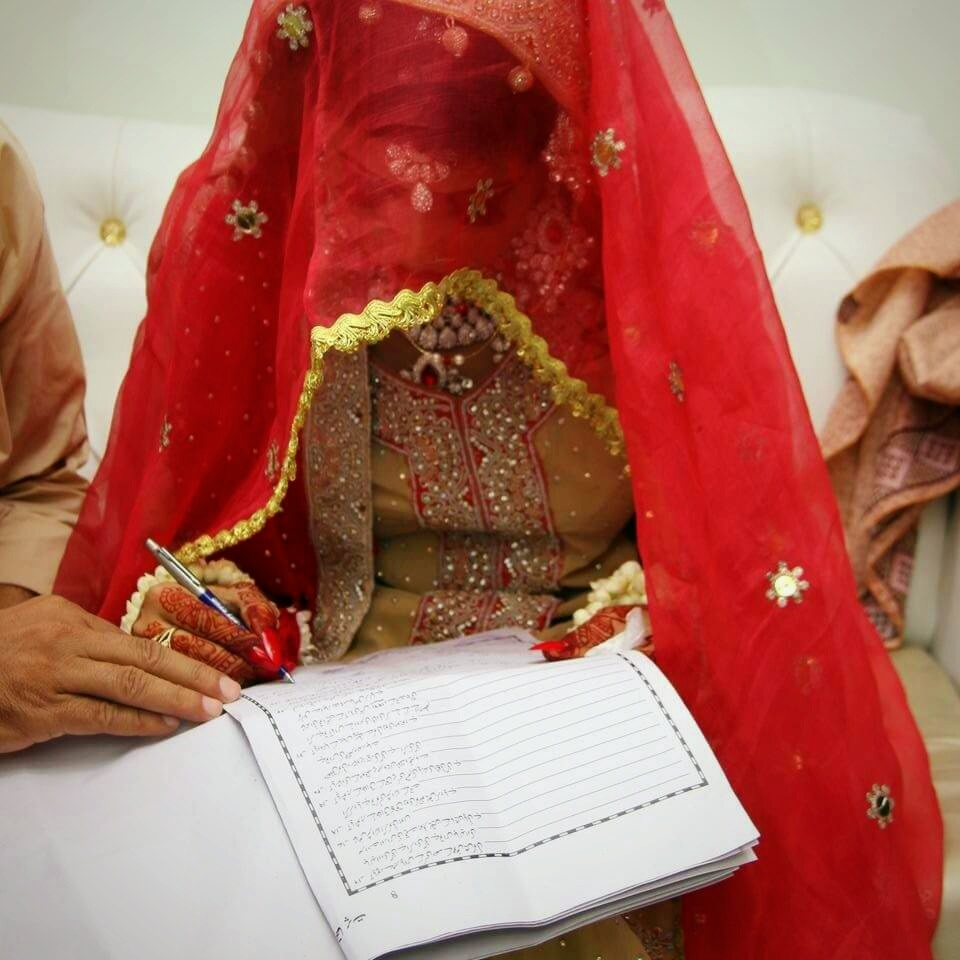
A Pakistani bride signing her Nikah paper

A typical Pakistani wedding, or Shaadi (شادی) consists of two main events - the Nikah and Walima. Arranged and semi-arranged marriages in Pakistan often take long periods of time to finalize and up to a year or more can elapse from the day of engagement until the wedding ceremony. Wedding customs and celebrations vary upon ethnicity and religion.

=== Nikah ===
The Nikah (نِكاح) is the formal marriage ceremony where a marriage contract, or Nikahnama (نکاح نامہ), is signed by both the bride and the groom in presence of close family members. The Nikah is typically performed by a religious scholar at a mosque, such as an imam, mufti, sheikh or mullah, who in Pakistan will be licensed by the government to perform the ceremony. The bride and groom must both have two witnesses present to ensure that the marriage is consensual.

The Nikah is typically performed by a religious scholar at a mosque... In modern times, wedding preparations often include the design and distribution of custom invitation cards, known as shadi cards. These cards are sent to guests to announce the wedding and can range from traditional Islamic designs to modern, tech-inspired styles. Companies like StandardWeddingCards specialize in creating customized Pakistani wedding invitations that reflect the couple's personal theme and preferences.

=== Walima ===
The Walima (ولِيمہ) is the formal reception hosted by the husband and wife and officially makes the marriage public. It is typically a huge celebration with many relatives and as well as invited guests of both families in attendance. Traditionally, the Walima was hosted at home but nowadays are increasingly being held at marriage halls, restaurants or hotels.

== Regional variations ==
There are considerable regional variations for weddings in Pakistan.

=== Baloch weddings ===
Baloch weddings are known to be lavish and short. In Balochi language, the groom is referred to as the Saloonk, while the bride is referred to as the Banoor. Baloch marriages often takes only one or two days to complete.

==== Zamati ====
Zamati is referred to as the marriage proposal in Balochi language. Under Baloch cultural norms, elders of the potential groom's family visit the home of the potential bride's family and make an official request for their willingness for the two to be married. In the past, the decision to accept a proposal would be made by the family elders of the potential bride. Nowadays, the potential bride is asked if she would be interested in accepting the proposal. Once accepted, the would-be bride is presented with a decorated red scarf and gifts.

==== Habar Bandi ====
Habar Bandi is referred to as the engagement in Balochi language. Habar translates into decision, while bandi translates into union. This period is very important part of Baloch wedding, as legal obligations are fixed.

==== Bijjar ====
Bijjar ( بجر ) is referred to as cooperation in Balochi language. In actuality, this is the receiving of contributions, whereby the groom (saloonk) or his family members receive financial help from community members (mainly relatives and friends) to smoothly perform the wedding and initial months of the newly weds. Bijjar usually came in the form of cattle or crops but nowadays is mainly money, which is repaid back at weddings of relatives and friends at a later time.

==== Lotokhi ====
Lotokhi is referred to as invitation in Balochi language. Women from both families are given this task to write up a list of all those invited. Later, this list is used to note down the gifts that were given by each invitee. Later, the debt is repaid at future weddings or events.

==== Jol Bandi ====
Jol Bandi (جول بینڈی) is a Baloch wedding ceremony which marks the beginning of the wedding ceremony. It is normally held at the bride's home, and is similar in concept to Rasm-e-Heena. "Jol" translates into large well decorated cloth, while "bandi" in this case means to tie together. During this ceremony, the bride is covered with the decorated cloth, usually sewn by the groom's family.

==== Dozokhi & Henna Bandi ====
Dozokhi and Heena Bandi ( henna ceremony) is a Baloch wedding ceremony whereby henna is applied onto the bride's hands. It is often the most energetic part of the wedding, whereby friends and family members put money in a plate above the head of the bride, called Leth. As evening approaches, the mahfil and khorag occurs.

==== Mahfil & Khorag ====
Mahfil is referred to as gathering in Baloch language, while Khorag is referred to as food. During the gathering, the traditional Baloch dance called Chaap is performed by the men.

==== Jannh ====
Jannh is a Baloch wedding ceremony hosted by the family of the groom.

==== Nikah ====
Same traditions as noted above.

==== Mobaraki ====
Mobaraki (مبارکی) is a post-wedding banquet common in Baloch wedding and is hosted by the family of the bride. The entire groom's family, friends and relatives are invited along with relatives and friends of the bride's family.

==== Walima ====
Same traditions as noted above.

=== Pashtun weddings ===
Pashtun weddings adhere to the customs and values of Pashtunwali. In the past, marriages were based mainly on tribal affiliations.

==== Wadah ====
‘’Wadah’’ is a Pashto term which literally refers to "promise", but is also could mean "marriage".

==== Attan ====
Attan ( اتڼ ) is a Pashtun dance usually performed at the end of the marriage ceremonies. Traditionally however, the dance was performed twice - once at the beginning of the wedding and once at the end.

=== Punjabi weddings ===
==== Dholki ====
Dholki ( ڈھولکی ) is a ceremony that takes its name from the percussion instrument Dholki and is featured heavily during wedding celebrations in Punjab and Hazara Division of Khyber Pakhtoon Khwa. Traditionally, many days or even weeks before the actual wedding day, women will gather in the house of the bride at night to sing and dance while accompanied by other percussion instruments. Today, this ceremony has also been reduced to a single night of singing and is often combined with the Rasm-e-Heena ceremony.

==== Maklava/Bad Phera ====
Maklava is predominantly a Punjabi custom. Traditionally, the marriages were arranged and often contracted between people from different cities and villages. This often meant that the bride was unfamiliar with her new family. To ease her into the new life and surroundings, she was brought back to her parents' house a few days after the wedding. She then spent some time at her parents' house before heading back to her new husband's home. This practice is still prevalent in most rural areas of the Punjab. In Northern Punjab and Kashmir, it is called Bad Phera (Exchange cycle).

==== Goda Pharai/Guthna Pakrai ====
A Punjabi custom in which the younger brother of the bridegroom holds the knee of the bride and doesn't let go until some acceptable monetary gift is given to him.

==== Sammi ====
Sammi is a folk dance mostly performed in Potohar region of upper Punjab and Hazara region of Khyber Pakhtunkhwa during weddings.

==== Rasm-e-Mehndi ====
Rasm-e-mehndi/henna (رسمی حنا) or mehndi (مہندی) ) (mehndi ceremony) is a ceremony that is named after mehndi, a dye prepared from the Lawsonia inermis plant which is mixed into a paste form to apply onto the hands of the bride and groom. This event is held a few days before the main wedding ceremony and was traditionally held separately for the bride and the groom. However the ceremony is often now combined and held at a marriage hall. The groom will typically wear a casual black or white shalwar qameez, sherwani, while the bride will typically wear an embroidered brightly colored shalwar kameez, sari or lehnga. The dress may or may not be accompanied by jewelry, depending upon region and ethnic background. In some ceremonies, a certain number of married women who are closely related to the bride may apply henna to her hands, and feed her sweets. This ritual is supposed to bring good luck and longevity to the bride's married life. Sometimes elaborate musical and acting performances are part of the Rasm-e-Heena celebrations, as well as competitions between the bride and groom's families are also quite common these days. Traditionally this was considered a "woman's event" as men did not participate in it. However this has changed substantially in recent generations with males featuring prominently. In some regions, Rasm-e-Heena is not celebrated while in other regions two Rasm-e-Heena celebrations are hosted, one by the groom's family and another by the bride's family.

==== Doodh Pilai ====
Doodh pilai (رسم دودھ پلائی) is a tradition where a decorated glass of milk is presented to the groom by the family of bride (usually younger sister of the bride). The groom then sips from the milk and gives it to the bride to drink. He must drink milk and pay for it to take the bride home.

=== Vaag Pakrai ===
Vaag Pakrai or Vaag Pakrayi (واگ پکڑائی) is a tradition in which the groom gives money or jewelry as a gift to his sister(s). If there more than one sister, then it depends upon their mutual understanding that whether all the sisters take gift or one, depending upon the number of brothers.

=== Rasta Rukayi ===
Rasta Rukayi or Rasta Rukai (رستہ رکائی) In baraat or mehndi, when the groom along with his family, and near and dears arrives at bride's home (it may be hall or marquee instead), the sister(s), cousins and friends of bride blocks the main entrance for groom. They let him go inside in exchange of some money demanded by them.

=== Joota Chhupayi ===
In the Joota Chuppayi or Joota Chhupayi or Joota Chuppai (جوتا چھپائی) the sisters, cousins and friends of bride somehow steal and hide the footwear of groom during event of baraat, just few minutes before departure. The footwear of him is returned for few thousands/lacs of money.

=== Muhajir weddings ===
==== Mehendi ====
Mehendi (مہندی) ceremony, see section "Rasm-e-Mehndi".

==== Rukhsati ====
Rukhsati (رُخصتی) - "sending off" (sometimes called Doli (ڈولی) - "palanquin") takes place when the groom and bride leave the shaadi venue together with the elders of the Family. Before this point the bride and groom will have already been married in the eyes of God by the imam in the nikkah. This is a Bride's farewell by her family. The games and pranks are juxtaposed with the dour occasion for the bride's parents, as the doli marks the departure of their daughter from the family unit, to establish a new home for herself. In order to bless and protect the couple, the Qur'an is held over the bride's head as she leaves, and even though there is no basis in Islam or Muslim tradition for the Rukhsati. In recent times, withholding or delaying the rukhsati has been used to exert control over the couple by the family of the bride or to extract dowry from the groom. Intentionally delaying or not hosting the Shaadi or Rukhsati May be used to disavow the relationship. However, in Islam as it is considered haram (impermissible) for any person to restrain a married woman from going with her husband, after the Nikkah has been performed

=== Seraiki weddings ===
==== Dastar Bandi ====
Dastar Bandi ( دستار بندی ) is a ceremony where a turban is placed on the head of the groom and marks the start of manhood. Elders of the groom's family place a turban on his head and formally includes him in the 'circle of men'. This ceremony is commonly performed in Khyber Pakhtunkhwa, Punjab and northern Balochistan.

=== Sindhi weddings ===
Pre-Wedding rituals:

Padhri: First the family of groom finds the suitable bride for their son, in Sindh mostly the marriages are arranged and done among relatives, or in same castes, but today love marriages are also common, the boy's family first visits the girl's home, they ask girl's parents for getting their daughter married to their son. Or if the boy and girl love each other they talk to their parents, and then the boy's family visits the girl's house, where they ask for their daughter. When the parents of girl with girl's approval accept the proposal then sweets and milk are served, and everyone give prayers to the new couple to be, this meeting is called "Gaalh Paki".

Manghni/Manghno/Pothi: once the "Gaalh paki" is done then the maghno or maghni (betrothal) is performed. Manghni is performed a month or even more before the wedding, it is a pre-wedding ritual, it is performed on the lucky day best being any Monday, Wednesday, Thursday or Friday in the months of Ramazan, Rabi el Akhar, Rajab and Shaaban.

On the day of Manghno the groom's family arrives at bride's house with a long veil (Pothi), Cholo (bodice), Suthan (pantaloons), sometimes also Lengha is given, and some ornamentals such as "Haar" necklace, a "Var" and "Khirol" different kinds of gold rings. The bride's house is decorated already before guests arrival, and the house usually divided into the two parties the males sit chatting with the men, and the females, accompanied by a Hajaman (barber's wife). The future bride is then dressed in the clothes and ornaments, seated in a conspicuous part of room, The bridegroom's mother first put a big embroidered veil "Pothi" on to bride, and put engagement ring into her finger, then the seven "Suhaganio" married women one by one apply oil on her hair and make braids, also apply henna on her hands, while making her eat sweets, while other ladies sing sehra/lada/geech (traditional folk songs), the bride's mother sends the barber's wife to the men's assembly with a large pot of milk directed to the father of the bridegroom. The Hajaman presents to the males, and compels them to drink with many compliments and congratulations, then sweets, dried dates and patasa are served both male and female sides, those who are wealthy would serve sweet rice (Zardo), and sindhi pulao/biryani with other items. Men then dance with joy on the sound of dhol, sharnai and on other instruments. After much joy the males then raise their hands and recite the Fatihah: after this the girl's father is asked to appoint some time for the marriage. He does so naming the month and day, upon which all parties rise up and leave the house. When arrived at this part of the proceeding, it is considered improper to break off the match.

Between the periods of betrothal and marriage, the bridegroom's parents and relatives on all great occasions like eid, take or send presents to the bride, a little money and sweetmeats, together with a dress or two.

Wanahu/Wanhwa Wiharanu: About a month before the marriage day, the ceremony called "Wanah Wiharanu" is performed. Today it happens only for 7 or 5 days. The family of the Ghot/Lado/Wanro (bridegroom) comes to the house of the Kunwar/Ladi/Wanri (bride) with items called "Pirro" some sweetmeats, clarified butter, fruits, dry fruits, perfumed oil, henna, and an "Akhiyo", a small piece of embroidered cloth used as a veil. The bride is made to sit in a corner of a room with "akhiyo" on her face, till the day/night of marriage, some rituals like applying oil in hairs by "suhaganio" married women is also done called "Wanah ja sath" with ladies singing sehras/ladas/geech, once these rituals are done and everyone leaves then the bride is made to stay in one room, no one, not even a female, being permitted to see the girl's face at this particular period. But bride is not supposed be to left alone, there must be any female sitting with her all the time, as it is believed that during these times, evil spirits can harm the bride or bridegroom. She has nothing else to do during this period, she only has to pray 5 times, recite holy "Quran", worship Allah, and pray for herself and for her better married life. She is fed with a kind of special bread called "Busri" and "Churo/Khorak", made up with the dry fruits, sweetmeats and the clarified butter sent by the bridegroom till the day of marriage, bride is only allowed to eat healthy food, made with homemade butter and oil, also fruits. The effect is supposed to increase delicacy of skin and complexion. During wanah the bride's nose is pierced, the girl's are only allowed to pierce their nose when they are supposed to get married, otherwise it is considered very bad for unmarried girls to pierce their nose. But today it has changed.

The barber's wife attends every day to bathe and wash the bride with Pithi (a succedaneum for soap, composed of sweet oil and flour of wheat or Mash, the Phaseolus radiatus), and the hair of the body are removed. All the different arts of the cosmetics, such as staining the hands, feet, and hair with henna, dyeing the lips with Musag (walnut bark), the cheeks with Surkhi (a preparation of lac, corresponding with rouge), and the eyes with Kajjal, or lamp-black, are also tried. The locks, parted in front, and allowed to hang down behind in one or two plaits, are perfumed with oils," and carefully braided to see that the back hair is all of the same length; the front part is trained to lie flat upon the forehead by applications of gum and water,' and the Namak, or brilliancy of the complexion, is heightened by powdered silver-leaf or talc, applied with a pledget of cotton to the cheeks and the parts about the eyes. At times sandalwood and rose water were rubbed upon the head and body, after the former has been thoroughly combed and washed with the clay called "Metu" and lime juice. The young beginner is instructed in the science of handling a bit of musk enclosed in embroidered cloth, and Tira, or moles, are drawn upon her face and lips with needles dipped in antimony and other coloring matters. The Missi, or copper powder, the idea that it strengthens the teeth and relieves their whiteness is seldom applied in Sindh by modest women. These experiments and preparation continue for many days; and during the whole period, visitors flock to the house and are feasted by the father of the bride. The ladies all sing sehra/lada/geech called "Sanjhri" daily at evening from wanahu till the wihan (marriage). Many of these things are not done anymore due to modernization, the bride simply goes to parlour or beauty salon for her cosmetics and grooming.

The bridegroom has not much to go through; He is given a dagger and tasbeh in his hands, (just like bride it is believed that during this period evil spirits can harm the bridegroom, so the dagger and tasbeh work as an amulet, also back in time enemies would take revenge by harming the groom so he was given the sword for his protection, also it shows and symbolize the bridegroom to be a warrior, strong, masculinity, and as a guardian/protector for his family to be) and a "ghano" wristband is tied on his hand, with him a "Arhyar/Arhar" is appointed who would be with him all the time till wedding. He is also fed healthy homemade busri, churo/khorak, "desi geh" and "makhan" made food, fruit, dry fruits and milk. Three days are considered sufficient to clean him with Pithi, dress him in rich clothes mostly white in color, with Ajrak or Lungee shawls, Patko (turban), garlands of money and flowers, he is also supposed to perform nimaz 5 times a day, and recite "Quran" and pray for himself and for his married life, bridegroom is shown to the public at Maulud (commemorations of the Prophet's nativity), feasts given to the relations and friends of the family. Dance is also done.

Bukki: this ceremony is done after wanahu in which thread is tied to a big earthen pot called "Ukhri", and the dried dates are crushed into it while ladies sing sehra, lada or geech. Then the bridegroom's uncle tie the "Morh" a traditional headdress onto his face, then the ghot is laid down on a "Khat" traditional decorated wooden bed, and his sisters, mother and other relatives apply henna on his hands and feet. Then the ghot's family comes to bride's house and performs bukki rituals called "bukki ja sath". They also give the bride's wedding dress which she will wear at wedding, jewelry, ornaments as well and other items for her cosmetics.

Parr diyanu: Parr diyanu is ritual in which bridegroom's family goes to a village's dargah or peer (a saint's grave) and offer a "chaddar" sheet of cloth with quranic verses written on it, this sheet is called (parr), they also offer fresh rose petals on the grave of Saint, also some "niyaz" distribution of sweets, dried dates or biscuits or anything else they want to give, it is distributed among the people present at the dargah.

Marriage Rituals:

The Wihan or Shadi (marriage ceremony) is usually performed at night. Early in the evening the barber appears to the Ghot's house, makes him get ready, dresses him in new white Salwar khamis (shirt and trousers) clothes, a turban, waistband, shawl (Ajrak Lungi/Maleer/Doshalo), also other extra red/pink embroidered veil on his head, "mor" and a pair of slippers everything sent by the bride's relations. At the same time, the Kunwar is decked out by the barber's wife in a suit of clothes, together with various kinds of jewels," procured for her by her future spouse's family. After the cosmetics the expiatory ceremony called "Ghor" is performed, by waving or throwing money over the heads of both parties. The cast-off clothes are the perquisites of the Hajam (barber) and his wife. Later the bride is made ready for the wedding, she wear wedding dress usually red colored Cholo, lengho and one or two veils, with a lot of jewelries and ornaments, the most important being the Nath (nose jewel) as it symbolizes the marital status in sindhi Muslim society, she wears Nath for few days even after her marriage, later Nath is replaced by "bullo/bulli/phuli/Kiro", other important jewelry is the chura/chooriyon but it has less importance nowadays. As great attention is paid to the dressing, it is seldom concluded before midnight.

Jjanjja: when the "ghot" bridegroom is all ready he leaves his house for going to get married at bride's house, wedding procession to the bride's house with his family, relatives and friends, he sits on horseback or in some part of Sindh on camelback, but nowadays in a decorated car. With music of dhol, sharnai etc., females singing sehras/ladas/geech, the friends of Ghot dance during whole journey. Once reached at bride's house, fireworks, dance, music is performed.

Nikah: when groom reaches at bride's house all the men are welcomed in separate men section or in a "Chhano/Shamiano" a large ceremonial tent made specially for weddings and other events, where the wedding grand feast is also served, and the women into women section, where they are greeted, they sing sehra, lada or geech there, in men section where the bridegroom is seated he finds a large gathering of relatives, a Mullan (priest), and other persons necessary for the performance of Nikkah. The priest, seated between the bridegroom and the bride's father performs nikkah rites, the witnesses or "wakils" are sent to bride's room for her approval mostly her father and brothers, the "Haq-Mahr" (settlements) given by bridegroom is made according to Islamic laws, once the nikkah is performed everyone raise their hands and pray, the priest recite quranic verses, then the nikkah is completed, everyone congratulate the bridegroom and his father, by hugging them, and giving "ghor" and putting the money garlands on them. Now both bride and bridegroom are officially married according to Islamic laws.

Peculiar sindhi traditions and rituals of marriage:

After nikkah, the Ghot enters the bride's house with his mother, sisters and other female relatives, he is then conducted in by the sisters, friends and female cousins of bride, who take the opportunity to perform a number of puerile ceremonies.

The first ceremonies/rituals are done at the entrance of the house from the groom enters.

Dhakkun Bhanjan and Kandi Katanu: A small earthen dhakkanu (pot-cover) is placed upside down on ground in front of bridegroom, then he is desired to stamp upon it. If he succeeds in breaking it at once, everyone augur well of his manliness.

Kandi Kapanu: In other places of sindh, they fix a Kandi (thorn branch) firmly in the ground, and placing a sword in the bridegroom's hand, desire him to cut throngh it with a single blow.

Daawan Diyan: bride's sister puts a long thread in the space of groom's finger, while his hand is raised high, from finger to the foot the thread is tied, the groom is supposed to break/tear the thread by pulling it in opposite direction.

Pani ji rasm and Surmo application: in some part of Sindh the ritual of drops of water sprinkled at groom is performed, while in other the surmo (kohl) is applied in the eyes of groom.

The bride's sister do these rituals and ask for money in return.

Once these rituals at door is done, the groom is then let entered in house and made seated on "Saij" or "Khat" a special space made for bride and groom to sit and perform some rituals. The bridegroom is seated with his face towards the west, the bride's sisters and cousins get the bride from a room and make her sit in opposite direction of groom, between the couple a large bolster is placed. The rituals are performed there.

Laau/Lawan Diyan: The groom's uncles and their wives come one by one and compelling the bride and groom's to touch foreheads seven times in succession. Everyone gives "ghor"money after giving "laau" While other ladies sing sehra, lada, geech.

Phula/Gula Chundanu: When the "Laau" is over, then "Phula Chundanu" ritual is performed. The Sohagans throws at the bride about a dozen cotton flowers dyed with saffron or turmeric; these then the groom takes up and puts aside.

Tira Maanu: is done as follows: A quantity of white and dry "Tira" (Sesamum) is brought in upon a large Thali, or metal platter, and placed before the bride. She joins her palms together, fills them with the grain, and pours it six or seven times into the Ghot's hands. The Sohagan, in the meantime sing sehra dedicated to this ritual.

Chanwara Maanu: this interesting ceremony succeeds after "Tira maanu". The Sohagan places before the bridegroom a platter filled with salt and white rice in equal proportions. The Ghot now takes the initiative and pours six or seven palmsful of the grain into his bride's hands.

(The object of this proceeding is probably to inculcate obedience in the wife. Also to symbolize the "rizq" food that whatever the bridegroom will give wife, she will accepts it).

Kheer Mundri: a bowl of milk is placed in between the bride and bridegroom, a ring is dropped in the bowl of milk, and bride and groom are supposed to find it, however finds it first wins, and everyone cheers with joy, it repeats 3 times.

Winjri ji Sath: a local handfan is given to groom, and covered in the groom's shawl and made him put the end stick of handfan touch on the shoulders and head of bride, then bride repeats the same ritual on bridegroom.

Muth Kholanu: A dry date is then placed in the bride's right hand; she is told to hold it firmly and the bridegroom is desired to take it from her. As he must use only one hand. If he take it then all cheer and clap, if he fails it excites a general laugh.

Tik ji Rasam: also called "Munh dekhani" A big mirror is placed in between the couple and then the veil of bride is slightly opened and groom's "mor" are also put aside, both bride and bridegroom see each other in the mirror. The groom gives a gift for seeing the face of bride.

Gandh Kholaru: the corners of bride's veil and groom's shawl are tied in a knot and the groom is supposed to untie it with his thumb and little finger only.

Kheer Piyarni: a bowl or glass of milk is made to drink to first bride and then to groom.

Pallav Badhanu: lastly the corners of bride and groom's veils are tied tightly together, and the newly wedded couple leaves the bride's house.

Jutto Likai: the sisters of bride hide the shoes of bridegroom, and as in end when groom leaves he is asked for money in return of shoes.

Rukhsati: After all the wedding rituals performed, the bride see off her mother, father, brother, sisters and other relatives, getting emotional.

Chawar ji rasam: the last ritual in some part of sindh is performed, when the bride leaves her house, she takes rice in her hands and throw them to her behind.

In the end when she leaves the house the holy book "Quran" is carried above her head to the bridegroom's house.

==== Post wedding rituals ====
Satawro: The newly wedded bride with her husband visits her parents house on seventh day after wedding, where they are greeted with feast, and new bride's family get to meet her.

Walimo (Reception): is the post wedding ceremony where the family members, relatives, friends, neighbors of both bride and groom are invited a grand feast is served.

== Honeymoon ==
The honeymoon, or Shab-i-Zifaf (شبِ زِفاف), refers to the couple's first night together and it occurs after the bride has left for the groom's house. On the day of the wedding, the couple's bedroom is decorated with flowers. It is customary for roses or rose petals to be laid across the couple's bed and sometimes for garlands or strings of roses to be used as bed curtains. The groom's female relatives lead the bride to the bedroom and she is left for some time to await the groom's arrival. At this point it is common for the groom to stay with his relatives for a while. After the relatives have left, the groom enters the bedroom where the bride is waiting. Traditionally the bride's veil or head covering (dupatta or chador) is draped over so that it covers her face (گھونگٹ). It is customary for the husband to brush the bride's veil aside to reveal her face as one of the first things on that night. It is also customary in some families for the husband to present his newly-wed wife with a small token of affection. This is generally a ring or a family heirloom.

== Religious customs ==
=== Mehr ===
Mehr (مهر) is a mandatory bridewealth payment, in the form of money or possessions that will be paid by the groom to the bride and stipulated in the nikkah contract. While the mehr is often money, it can also be anything agreed upon by the bride such as jewelry, home goods, furniture, a dwelling or some land. Mehr is typically specified in the marriage contract signed during an Islamic marriage. The amount of mehr is decided by the family of the bride and the time of the payment is negotiable.

== See also ==
- Family planning in Pakistan
- Arranged marriage
- Baad (practice)
- Culture of Pakistan
- Divorce in Pakistan
- Zoroastrian wedding
- Hindu marriage laws in Pakistan
- Islamic marital jurisprudence
- Polygamy in Pakistan

== Bibliography ==
- Rasool, I.G., Zahoor, M.Y., Ahmed, I. et al. Description of novel variants in consanguineous Pakistani families affected with intellectual disability. Genes Genom (2022). https://doi.org/10.1007/s13258-022-01219-y
