= Polygamy in Pakistan =

Polygamy in Pakistan is legally permissible, according to the law of 1961, but restricted to Muslim men, who may have a maximum of four wives at one time. However it is illegal for Hindus as per the Hindu marriage law.

The extent to which polygamy exists in Pakistan is contested. According to Immigration and Refugee Board of Canada, a professor of law at Warwick Law School writes that while polygamy is a cultural tradition, most families do not accept the second wife as a part of the family. On the other hand, Shirkat Gah, a Pakistani women's rights organisation, found that polygyny is "common". However, a representative of the Human Rights Commission of Pakistan says that polygamy is rare, except within communities in Sindh, Southern Punjab or religious fundamentalists. A gender studies consultant, however, writes that it is also found within the urban elite of Pakistan because they can afford to keep and maintain more than one wife and their children. That said, it is still considered to be low in number.

A man who wishes to remarry is required to obtain the legal consent of each of his current wives, and to show that he can properly take care of all of them. Pakistani women can add a clause in their Muslim marriage contracts forbidding polygamy.

There have been calls to prohibit or criminalize the practice by some in Pakistan, and there have also been some who have shown support of it.

== Notable Legal Action ==
In 2017, a Lahore lower court ruled against a man who remarried without obtaining permission from his first wife. He was sentenced to a six-month jail term and a fine of Rs. 2,00,000. The chair of the Punjab Commission on the Status of Women, Fauzia Viqar, applauded the move, saying that it would empower wronged women to take legal action.

== See also ==
- Marriage in Pakistan
- Divorce in Pakistan
- Women related laws in Pakistan
