= Triple talaq in India =

Form of Islamic divorce

Triple talaq (instant divorce) and talaq-e-mughallazah (irrevocable divorce) were a type of Islamic divorce previously available to Muslims in India, especially adherents of Hanafi Sunni Islamic schools of jurisprudence. A Muslim man could legally divorce his wife by proclaiming three times consecutively the word talaq (the Arabic word for "divorce") (in spoken, written or, more recently, electronic form).

The use and status of triple talaq in India has been a subject of controversy and debate. Those questioning the practice have raised issues of justice, gender equality, human rights and secularism. The debate has involved the Government of India and the Supreme Court of India, and is connected to the debate about a uniform civil code (Article 44) in India. On 22 August 2017, the Indian Supreme Court deemed instant triple talaq (talaq-e-biddah) unconstitutional. Three of the five judges in the panel concurred that the practice of triple talaq is unconstitutional. The remaining two declared the practice to be constitutional. On 30 July 2019, the Parliament of India declared the practice of triple talaq illegal and unconstitutional and made it a crime from 1 August 2019. Three of India's neighbouring countries — Pakistan, Bangladesh and Sri Lanka — are among the 23 countries worldwide that have banned triple talaq. The Quran describes mechanisms for avoiding hasty divorces, prescribing two waiting periods of three months before the divorce is final in order to give the husband time to reconsider his decision. A bench of the Supreme Court of India has stated that the practice of divorce for Muslim men through, "Talaq-e-Hasan" which is pronounced once a month over a period of three months is allowed and a Muslim woman can also part ways with her husband through "khula (mutually agreed divorce)".

== Legal ban on triple talaq ==
The Muslim Women (Protection of Rights on Marriage) Act, 2019 passed on 30 July 2019 after a very long discussion and opposition finally got the verdict (the Indian Supreme Court judgement of August 2017 described below) to all women. It made triple talaq illegal in India on 1 August 2019, replacing the triple talaq ordinance promulgated in February 2019. It stipulates that instant triple talaq (talaq-e-biddat) in any form – spoken, written, or by electronic means such as email or SMS – is illegal and void, with up to three years in jail for the husband. Under the new law, an aggrieved woman is entitled to demand maintenance for her dependent children.

The Government first introduced the bill to Parliament on 22 August 2017. MPs from Rashtriya Janata Dal, All India Majlis-e-Ittehadul Muslimeen, Biju Janata Dal, All India Anna Dravida Munnetra Kazhagam, Indian National Congress and All India Muslim League opposed the bill. Several Opposition lawmakers called for it to be sent to a select committee for scrutiny. It was passed on 28 December 2017 by the Lok Sabha, or lower house of the Indian Parliament, where the decision found support from majority members of the House.

In a major political win for the BJP government, the Rajya Sabha, or upper house of Parliament, where the ruling NDA did not have a majority, approved the bill (99–84) on 30 July 2019 after a lengthy debate.

The bill followed a 2017 Supreme Court ruling that the practice of instant triple talaq is unconstitutional and a divorce pronounced by uttering talaq three times in one sitting is void and illegal.

Muslim triple talaq petitioner Ishrat Jahan welcomed the Bill when it was presented. Also Arif Mohammad Khan welcomed and appreciated the decision taken by Government and Parliament of India.

The triple talaq bill proposed by the previous Modi government lapsed when an election was called and the Lok Sabha was dissolved before the bill was sent to the Rajya Sabha for approval.

== Practice ==
Triple talaq is a form of divorce that was practised in Islam, whereby a Muslim man could legally divorce his wife by pronouncing talaq (the Arabic word for divorce) three times. The pronouncement could be oral or written, or, in recent times, delivered by electronic means such as telephone, SMS, email or social media. The man did not need to cite any cause for the divorce and the wife need not have been present at the time of pronouncement. After a period of iddat, during which it was ascertained whether the wife is pregnant, the divorce became irrevocable. In the recommended practice, a waiting period was required before each pronouncement of talaq, during which reconciliation was attempted. However, it had become common to make all three pronouncements in one sitting. While the practice was frowned upon, it was not prohibited. A divorced woman could not remarry her divorced husband unless she first married another man, a practice called nikah halala.

The practice of talaq-e-biddat is said to have been around since the period of Caliph Umar, more than 1400 years ago. The Supreme Court described it as "manifestly arbitrary" and said that it allows a man to "break down [a] marriage whimsically and capriciously".

Instant divorce is termed talaq-e-bid'at. A hadith by An-Nasa'i stated that Muhammad had accused a man of mocking the Quran by uttering divorce thrice in one go. Talaq pronounced thrice simultaneously from Muhammad to the first two years of Umar's reign as caliph was only considered as a single divorce according to Sahih Muslim. The latter however allowed it, upon seeing the people did not observe the iddah, but also had men using such divorce flogged.

Abu Hanifa, Malik ibn Anas, Al-Shafi'i, Ahmad ibn Hanbal and majority of scholars from Salaf and Khalaf (later generations) are of the opinion that triple talaq is valid. In Sunni Islam, there is a consensus (ijma) that triple talaq is valid.

Abu Hanifa and Malik ibn Anas considered it irrevocable despite its illegality. Al-Shafi'i considered it permissible and Ahmad ibn Hanbal considered it to be valid.

Triple talaq is not mentioned in the Quran. It is also largely disapproved by Muslim legal scholars. Many Islamic nations have barred the practice, including Pakistan and Bangladesh, although it is technically legal in Sunni Islamic jurisprudence. Triple talaq, in Islamic law, is based upon the belief that the husband has the right to reject or dismiss his wife with good grounds.

The All India Muslim Personal Law Board (AIMPLB), a non-governmental organisation, had told the Supreme Court that women could also pronounce triple talaq, and could execute nikahnamas that stipulated conditions so that the husbands could not pronounce triple talaq. According to AIMPLB, "Sharia grants right to divorce to husbands because Islam grants men a greater power of decision-making."

== Background ==
Muslim family affairs in India are governed by the Muslim Personal Law (Shariat) Application Act, 1937 (often called the "Muslim Personal Law"). It was one of the first acts to be passed after the Government of India Act 1935 became operational, introducing provincial autonomy and a form of dyarchy at the federal level. It replaced the so-called "Anglo-Mohammedan Law" previously operating for Muslims, and became binding on all of India's Muslims.

The sharia is open to interpretation by the ulama (class of Muslim legal scholars). The ulama of Hanafi Sunnis considered this form of divorce binding, provided the pronouncement was made in front of Muslim witnesses and later confirmed by a sharia court. However, the ulama of Ahl-i Hadith, Twelver and Musta'li persuasions did not regard it as proper. Scholar Aparna Rao states that, in 2003, there was an active debate among the ulama.

In traditional Islamic jurisprudence, triple talaq is considered to be a particularly disapproved, but legally valid, form of divorce. Changing social conditions around the world have led to increasing dissatisfaction with traditional Islamic law of divorce since the early 20th century and various reforms have been undertaken in different countries. Contrary to practices adopted in most Muslim-majority countries, Muslim couples in India are not required to register their marriage with civil authorities. Muslim marriages in India are considered to be a private matter, unless the couple decided to register their marriage under the Special Marriage Act of 1954. Owing to these historical factors, the checks that have been placed on the husband's unilateral right of divorce by governments of other countries and the prohibition of triple talaq were not implemented in India.

== Opinions ==
=== Opposition ===
The practice faced opposition from Muslim women, some of whom filed a public interest litigation in the Supreme Court against the practice, terming it "regressive". The petitioners asked for section 2 of the Muslim Personal Law (Shariat) Application Act, 1937, (Note: Section 2 in The Muslim Personal Law (Shariat) Application Act, 1937 states about Application of Personal law to Muslims, "Notwithstanding any custom or usage to the contrary, in all questions (save questions relating to agricultural land) regarding intestate succession, special property of females, including personal property inherited or obtained under contract or gift or any other provision of Personal Law, marriage, dissolution of marriage, including talaq, ila, zihar, lian, khula and mubaraat, maintenance, dower, guardianship, gifts, trusts and trust properties, and wakfs (other than charities and charitable institutions and charitable and religious endowments) the rule of decision in cases where the parties are Muslims shall be the Muslim Personal Law (Shariat).") to be scrapped, describing it as being against Article 14 of the Constitution (equality before the law).

On 13 May 2017, during the hearings before its final judgment, the Supreme Court described instant triple talaq as the "worst form of marriage dissolution". It noted that the custom is banned in the Muslim-majority countries of Saudi Arabia, Morocco, Afghanistan, and Pakistan. On 8 December 2016, the Allahabad High Court observed in a ruling that the practice of instant triple talaq was unconstitutional and violated the rights of Muslim women.

In March 2017, over 1 million Indian Muslims, a majority of whom were women, signed a petition to end instant triple talaq. The petition was started by the Muslim Rashtriya Manch, an Islamic organisation affiliated to the Rashtriya Swayamsevak Sangh. The petitioners against instant triple talaq have given evidence showing how instant triple talaq is simply an innovation that does not have much to do with Quranic beliefs. This is supported by the interpretation of Quranic text by many Islamic scholars, historical evidence and legal precedent.

On 10 May 2017, senior cleric Maulana Syed Shahabuddin Salafi Firdausi denounced triple talaq and nikah halala, calling them un-Islamic practices and instruments to oppress women. The practice was also opposed by Hindu nationalists and Muslim liberals. Congress leader Kapil Sibal tweeted: "Absence of consensus in Court makes it more difficult to forge consensus within communities. Glad that Court set aside a 'sinful' practice." However, Sibal also made statements supporting triple talaq (see the following section).

Over the year women organisations like Bharatiya Muslim Mahila Andolan and several others opposed this practice in particular and further demanded more reforms in Muslim personal laws.

=== Support ===
Triple talaq has been supported by the All India Muslim Personal Law Board (AIMPLB), a non-governmental body that supervises the application of Muslim personal law. It believes that the State does not have the right to intervene in religious matters. The AIMPLB's lawyer Kapil Sibal had said that though instant talaq can be thought of as a sin by some, but that "setting the validity of customs and practices of a community is a slippery slope". Kapil Sibal cited Article 371A to state that even the Constitution does intend to protect matters of practice, tradition and customs of communities. However, Sibal has also made statements opposing the practice (see previous section).

The All India Muslim Personal Law Board (AIMPLB) defends the practice. In April 2017, citing a report prepared by Muslim Mahila Research Kendra in co-ordination with Shariah Committee for Women, AIMPLB claimed that Muslims have a lower rate of divorce compared to other religious communities, countering the argument that Muslims have the highest number of divorces in the country due to the practice of triple talaq. It also claimed that it had received forms from 35 million Muslim women across the country, supporting shariat and triple talaq.

AIMPLB issued a code of conduct in April 2017 regarding talaq in response to the controversy over the practice of triple talaq. It warned that those who divorce for reasons not prescribed under shariat will be socially boycotted, in addition to calling for boycott of those who use triple talaq recklessly and without justification. It also stated that it should be delivered in three sittings with a gap of at least one month each.

Opining on this, Aakar Patel, Chair of the Board of Amnesty International in India, argued that Muslims are the only communities for whom a form of divorce has been criminalized.

== Judgement ==
=== Shayara Bano v. Government of India & ors ===
The bench that heard the controversial Shayara Bano v. Government of India & Others case in 2017 was made up of multifaith members. The five judges from five different communities are Chief Justice J. S. Khehar (a Sikh), and Justices Kurian Joseph (a Christian), R. F. Nariman (a Parsi), U. U. Lalit (a Hindu) and S. Abdul Nazeer (a Muslim).

The Supreme Court examined whether Triple talaq has the protection of the constitution—if this practice is safeguarded by Article 25(1) in the constitution that guarantees all the fundamental right to "profess, practice and propagate religion". The Court wanted to establish whether or not triple talaq is an essential feature of Islamic belief and practice.

In a 397-page ruling, though two judges upheld validity of instant triple talaq (talaq-e-biddat), the three other judges held that it was unconstitutional, thus barring the practice by a 3–2 majority. One judge argued that instant triple talaq violated Islamic law. The bench asked the central government to promulgate legislation within six months to govern marriage and divorce in the Muslim community. The court said that until the government formulates a law regarding instant triple talaq, there would be an injunction against husbands pronouncing instant triple talaq on their wives.

According to The Economist, "Constitutional experts said [the judges] legal reasoning fell short of upholding personal rights over religious laws", whilst noting "The judgment did not ban other forms of Muslim divorce that favour men, only the instant kind."

== Legislation ==
=== The Muslim Women (Protection of Rights on Marriage) Bill, 2017 ===
The Government formulated a bill and introduced it in the Parliament, citing reports of around 100 cases of instant triple talaq in the country since the Supreme Court judgement in August 2017. On 28 December 2017, the Lok Sabha passed The Muslim Women (Protection of Rights on Marriage) Bill, 2017.

The bill sought to make instant triple talaq (talaq-e-biddah) in any form spoken, in writing or by electronic means such as email, SMS and WhatsApp illegal and void, with a provision of imprisonment of up to three years for the husband. The ruling Bharatiya Janata Party (BJP) supported the bill and defended the criminalisation provision as necessary to protect the rights of Muslim women. MPs from RJD, AIMIM, BJD, AIADMK, and AIML opposed the bill, calling it arbitrary and flawed. The Indian National Congress opposed the bill in its existing form, objecting primarily to the criminalisation clause and seeking that the matter be addressed through civil remedies and safeguards against misuse. A total of 19 amendments were moved in the Lok Sabha, all of which were rejected.

=== The Muslim Women (Protection of Rights on Marriage) Ordinance, 2018 ===
On the grounds that practice of instant triple talaq was continuing unabated despite the SC striking it, the government issued an ordinance to make the practice illegal and void.

The provisions of the ordinance are as follows:

- Instant triple talaq remains cognizable with a maximum of three years imprisonment and a fine.
- Only complaint with the police by the wife or her blood relative will be recognised.
- The offence is non-bailable i.e. only a Magistrate and not the police can grant bail. Bail can be granted only after hearing the wife.
- Custody of the minor children from the marriage will go to mother.
- Maintenance allowance to the wife is decided by the magistrate.

The ordinance was cleared by the President on 19 September 2018.

=== The Muslim Women (Protection of Rights on Marriage) Bill, 2018 ===
As the triple talaq ordinance of 2018 was to expire on 22 January 2019, the government introduced a fresh bill in the Lok Sabha on 17 December 2018 to replace the ordinance.

The provisions of the bill are as follows:

- All declaration of instant triple talaq, including in written or electronic form, to be void (i.e. not enforceable in law) and illegal.
- Instant triple talaq remains cognisable offence with a maximum of three years' imprisonment and a fine. The fine amount is decided by the magistrate.
- The offence will be cognisable only if information relating to the offence is given by the wife or her blood relative.
- The offence is non-bailable. But there is a provision that the Magistrate may grant bail to the accused. The bail may be granted only after hearing the wife and if the Magistrate is satisfied with reasonable grounds for granting bail.
- The wife is entitled to subsistence allowance. The amount is decided by the magistrate.
- The wife is entitled to seek custody of her minor children from the marriage. The manner of custody will be determined by the Magistrate.
- The offence may be compounded (i.e. stop legal proceedings and settle the dispute) by the Magistrate upon the request of the woman (against whom talaq has been declared).

The bill was passed by Lok Sabha on 27 December 2018. However, the bill remained stuck in the Rajya Sabha due to the opposition's demand to send it to a select committee.

=== The Muslim Women (Protection of Rights on Marriage) Ordinance, 2019 ===
As the triple talaq ordinance of 2018 was to expire on 22 January 2019 and also because the triple talaq bill of 2018 could not be passed in the parliament session, the government repromulgated the ordinance on 10 January 2019. On 12 January 2019, the president of India Ram Nath Kovind approved the ordinance of 2019.

=== The Muslim Women (Protection of Rights on Marriage) Act, 2019 ===
The Muslim Women (Protection of Rights on Marriage) Act, 2019 became law on 31 July 2019, replacing the earlier ordinance.

== See also ==
- Shah Bano case
- All India Muslim Women's Personal Law Board
- Holy Rights
- Muslim personal law in India

== Bibliography ==
- Choudhury, Cyra Akila (2008), "(Mis)Appropriated Liberty: Identity, Gender Justice and Muslim Personal Law Reform in India", Columbia Journal of Gender & Law, 17 (1): 45–110
- Esposito, John L.; DeLong-Bas, Natana J. (2001). Women in Muslim Family Law (2nd ed.). Syracuse University Press.
- Joseph, Suad; Naǧmābādī, Afsāna (2003), Encyclopedia of Women and Islamic Cultures: Family, Law and Politics, Brill, p. 341, ISBN 90-04-12818-2
  - Murshid, Tazeen Mahnaz (2003), "Inheritance: Contemporary Practice – South Asia", Ibid, BRILL, p. 304, ISBN 90-04-12818-2
  - Rao, Aparna (2003), "Kinship, Descent Systems and State – South Asia", Ibid, BRILL, p. 341, ISBN 90-04-12818-2
- Mukhopadhyay, Maitrayee (August 1994), Construction of Gender Identity: Women, the State and Personal Laws in India, University of Sussex
- Singh, Rajvendra (December 2019), Three Verdicts : the Man with Extreme Will Power, Amazon Publishing.
