= Muslim Family Laws Ordinance, 1961 =

The Muslim Family Laws Ordinance (MFLO) is a legislative act promulgated in Pakistan in March 1961 during the presidency of Ayub Khan. Drafted on the basis of recommendations by the Commission on Marriage and Family Laws, it represents Pakistan's first major attempt to codify Muslim personal law. Unlike the Shariah Act of 1937 enacted under British colonial rule, the MFLO sought to assert Islamic legitimacy while introducing legal reforms in the areas of marriage, divorce, succession, and maintenance.

== Provisions ==
The ordinance introduced state regulation into family matters that had previously been governed largely by religious interpretation and customary practice. It mandated the compulsory registration of all marriages with local authorities, with noncompliance punishable by fines or imprisonment. Local officials were authorized to license marriage registrars to enforce this requirement.

=== Polygyny ===
The MFLO did not prohibit polygyny but imposed regulatory restrictions. A man seeking to contract a subsequent marriage was required to obtain the consent of his existing wife or wives and prior approval from an arbitration council chaired by a local official. The council assessed whether the proposed marriage was “necessary and just.” This provision was grounded in a modernist interpretation of Quranic verses (IV:3 and IV:129).

=== Divorce ===
The ordinance rendered the practice of instant divorce through triple repudiation (talaq) legally ineffective. A husband was required to provide written notice of divorce to the chairman of the local council and to his wife, which triggers a mandatory 90-day reconciliation period overseen by an arbitration council. If the wife was pregnant, the divorce did not take effect until after childbirth.

=== Dower ===
The ordinance empowered local arbitration councils to determine maintenance payments. It also stipulated that the dower (mahr) was payable on demand unless otherwise specified. The standardized marriage contract (nikah nama) enabled women to obtain the delegated right of divorce (talaq-e-tafwid) and to seek enforcement of contractual conditions.
