= Kashmiri wedding =

Kashmir is shared between Pakistan and India. Kashmiri wedding can therefore mean

- Marriage in Pakistan
- Weddings in India
