= Muslim Women Rights Day =

Anniversary of The Muslim Women (Protection of Rights on Marriage) Act, 2019

- Observed by: India
- Type: National
- Significance: To commemorate the enactment of the law against Triple talaq in India
- Date: 1 August
- Frequency: Annual
- Related to: The Muslim Women (Protection of Rights on Marriage) Act, 2019

The Muslim Women Rights Day is observed across the country on 1 August, to celebrate the enactment of the Muslim Women (Protection of Rights on Marriage) Act, 2019 which prohibits the practice of Triple talaq in India.

The legislation classifying triple talaq as a criminal offence came into effect on 1 August 2019. The practice of triple talaq was prohibited and Muslim couples were mandated to get divorced as per the Indian Penal Code and not the Sharia Law. The first Muslim Women Rights Day was observed on 1 August 2020 across the country.

The Minister of Minority Affairs, Mukhtar Abbas Naqvi said that the Government aims to celebrate the "self-reliance, self-respect and self-confidence" of the Muslim women of the country and protected their constitutional, fundamental and democratic rights.
