= Holy Rights =

- Directed by: Farha Khatun
- Produced by: Priyanka More
- Cinematography: Debalina & Priyanka Biswas
- Edited by: Sankha
- Music by: Santajit Chatterjee
- Distributed by: Filmotor
- Release date: March 2020 (IAWRT Asian Women’s Film Festival)
- Running time: 53 Minutes
- Country: India
- Language: Urdu

Holy Rights is a 2020 Urdu documentary film directed by Farha Khatun on Bharatiya Muslim Mahila Andolan's work on Muslim women's divorce issues relating to triple talaq in India. It was presented at the 26th Kolkata International Film Festival.

== Awards and recognition ==
Holy Rights documentary shared the 2021 Indian National Film Awards for best film on social issues.
