= Zakia Soman =

Indian activist

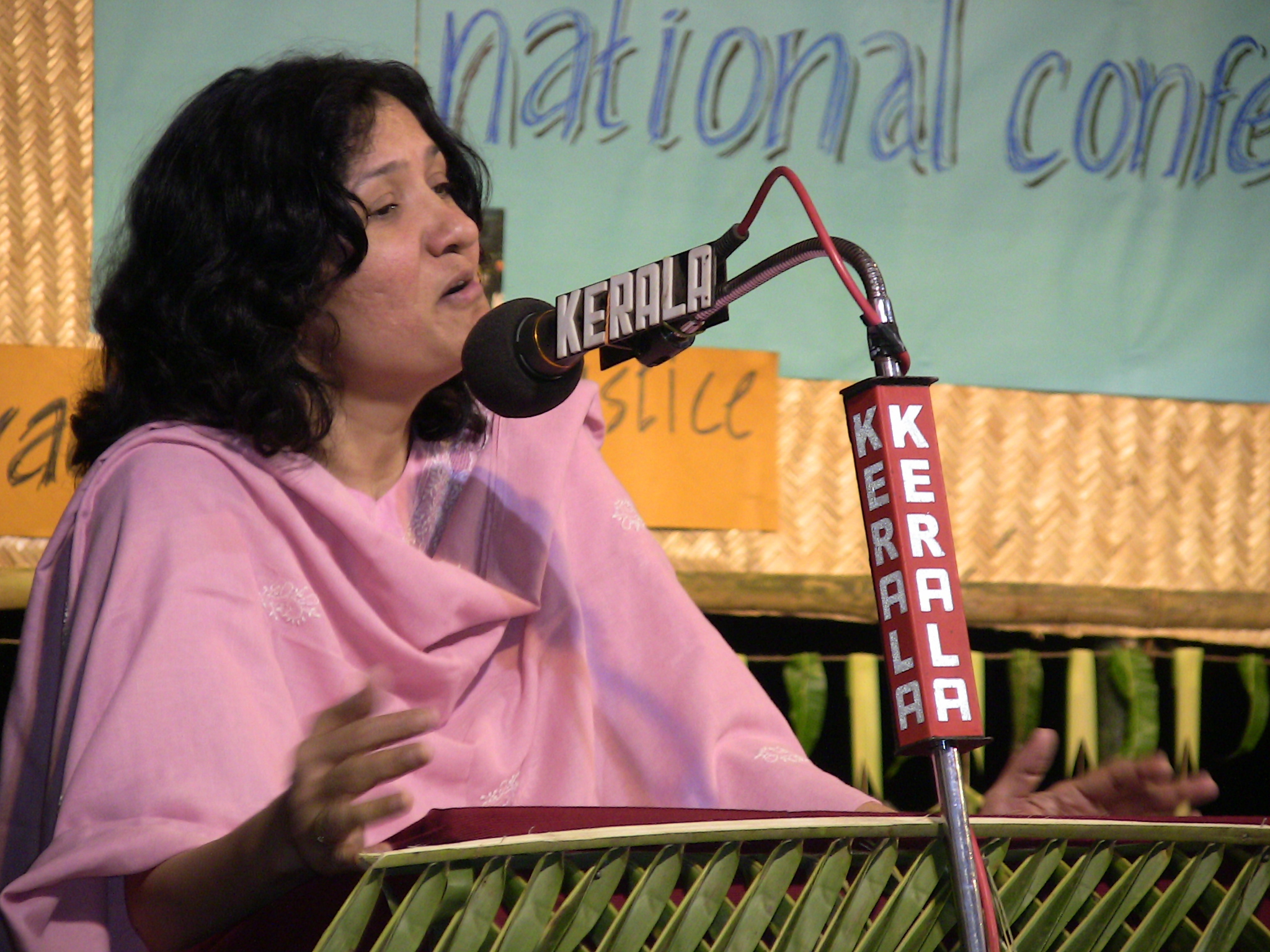
- Zakia Soman
- Born: Ahmedabad, Gujarat, India
- Education: University of Gujrat
- Occupations: University professor, Founder of Bharatiya Muslim Mahila Andolan
- Known for: Women's rights activism
- Awards: Outstanding Women Achiever's Award by National Commission for Women (2014)

Zakia Soman is an Indian women's rights activist and the founder of Bharatiya Muslim Mahila Andolan, a non-governmental women's rights organization.

== Early life and career ==
Zakia Soman was born in Ahmedabad, Gujarat. She worked as a university professor of Business Communication in English at the University of Gujrat.

== Activism ==
Zakia advocates for the rights of Muslim women. She has worked and written extensively on issues of peace and justice, secularism, human rights, and minority rights. She also set up and heads the Peace and Human Security theme in ActionAid.

She is a member of South Asian Alliance for Poverty Eradication (SAAPE). She used to be a university professor in Gujarat before she quit her job and started working for minority rights. She is a founder of Centre for Peace Studies, which engages in knowledge activism for peace and tolerance.

Zakia has supported the Indian Supreme Court's verdict that Muslim women are entitled to maintenance after divorce under Section 125 of the Criminal Procedure Code. She has spoken out against polygamy among Indian Muslims, saying that was permitted only in a certain context and was not valid in modern times.

== Recognition ==
In 2014, she was awarded Outstanding Women Achiever's Award by the National Commission for Women. She has also featured in BBC's 100 Fearless Women in November 2015.

== Works ==
- Reclaiming Sacred Spaces: Muslim Women's Struggle for Entry into Haji Ali Dargah Zakia Soman
- Journal of Development Policy Review: Vol. 1 Issues. 3: Life in the Era of COVID-19: Perceiving the Impact Heera Lal
- Courage Unlocked: Personal Stories of Muslim Women’s Lives, Struggles and Leadership
- Seeking Justice Within Family: A National Study on Muslim Women’s Views on Reforms in Muslim Personal Law
- Indian Muslim Women’s Movement: For Gender Justice and Equal Citizenship
- Status of Women in Polygamous Marriages and Need for Legal Protection
