= Protection Against Harassment of Women at the Workplace Act, 2010 =

Pakistani legislation

The Protection Against Harassment of Women at the Workplace Act, 2010 is a legislative act in Pakistan that seeks to protect women from sexual harassment at their place of work. The Acts of Majlis-e-Shoora (Parliament) received the assent of the President on 9 March, 2010. The objective was to "create a safe working environment for women, which is free of harassment, abuse and intimidation with a view toward fulfillment of their right to work with dignity."

== Background ==
Prior to the Act, sexual harassment had never been defined in Pakistan through legislative instrument, nor was there a clear definition of harassment, whether in public, private or workplaces.

== Implementation ==
The majority of Pakistan's working female population works without a contract. Over 60% of Pakistan's informal labor sector is not protected by this law, as they work without a contract.

== Amendments ==
The Act has been amended multiple times.

An amendment, Protection Against Harassment of Women at the Workplace (Amendment) Act, 2014, was introduced in the senate on 20 January 2014.

== See also ==
- Women related laws in Pakistan
- Aurat March
