= Women-related laws in Pakistan =

The legislative assembly of Pakistan has enacted several measures designed to give women more power in the areas of family, inheritance, revenue, civil, and criminal laws. These measures are an attempt to safeguard women's rights to freedom of speech and expression without gender discrimination. These measures are enacted keeping in mind the principles described by the Quran.

Laws such as the Muslim Personal Law of Sharia (addressing a woman's right to inherit all forms of property), the Muslim Family Law Ordinance or MFLO (intended to protect women against practices regarding marriage, divorce, polygamy and other personal relationships), and the Hudood Ordinance have been legislated to ensure the rights of women. The Hudood Ordinance was seen as working at cross-purposes to the rights of women by victimizing women only, which was corrected by the introduction of Women's Protection Bill.

The Sexual Harassment Bill was created to ensure women's safety in public and work spaces, while the Prevention of Anti-Women Practices Bill sought to constitutionally protect women against discriminatory social practices, such as forced marriages, which can deprive women of their inheritance rights. The bill incorporated strong penalties for offenders. The Acid Control and Acid Crime Prevention Bill was aimed at controlling the import, production, transportation, hoarding, sale, and use of acid, as well as providing legal support to acid burn victims. Penalties include imprisonment anywhere from fourteen years to life and fines up to 1 million rupees.

== Constitutional equal rights ==
Constitutionally, Pakistani Muslim women are able to vote, participate in elections, hold public offices and pursue most professions.

=== Laws which protect the rights and safety of women ===
- The Domestic Violence (Prevention and Protection) Bill (2009)
- The Acid Control and Acid Crime Prevention Act (2010)
- The Protection Against Harassment of Women in the Workplace Act (2010)
- The Criminal Law (Amendment) Act (2010)
- The Prevention of Anti-Women Practices Act (2011)
- The Women in Distress and Detention Fund (2011)
- The Criminal Law (Amendment) Act (targeted at preventing acid-related crimes) (2011)
- The Domestic Violence Prevention and Protection Bill (2012)
- The National Commission on the Status of Women Act (2012)
- The National Commission for Human Rights Act (2012)
- Transgender Persons (Protection of Rights) Act, 2018
- The Dowry and Bridal Gifts Act
- The Women, Violence and Jirgas Act
- Marriage in the Quran
- Women Agriculture Bill 2019
- Sindh Women Agriculture Workers Act (SWAWA) of 2019 passed in 2021

=== Family laws ===
- The Dissolution of Muslim Marriage Act (1939, amended in 1961)
- The Muslim Family Laws Ordinance (1961)
- Hindu marriage laws in Pakistan

=== Marriageable age and divorce ===
Divorce in Pakistan is regulated by the Dissolution of Muslim Marriage Act (1939, amended in 1961) and the Family Courts Act (1964). The Child Marriage Restraint Act or CMRA (1929) set the marrying age for women at 16; in the province of Sindh, as per the Sindh Child Marriage Restraint Act, it is 18.

=== Inheritance ===
Under British rule, the Married Women's Property Act (1874) was in force, which primarily defined issues related to pre- and post-marriage assets, liability and insurance. The Muslim Personal Law (Shariat) Application Act (1937) and its successor, the Muslim Personal Law (Shariat) Application Act (1961), provide Muslim women with limited inheritance rights; they received half of the amount assigned to sons, two-thirds if there were no sons, and further complex calculations settled the remainder per sectarian principles. While this right to inheritance existed on paper, it was not observed in practice, so the Government of Pakistan enacted strong provisions in sections 498 A and 498 C of the Prevention of Anti-Women Practices (Criminal Law Amendment) Act (2011) to ensure women received their proper inheritance.

Pakistan, as a signatory of the Convention on the Elimination of All Forms of Discrimination Against Women (CEDAW), is expected to progress towards eliminating property discrimination and recognizing the equality of citizens as a fundamental right.

== Law of Evidence ==
Until 1987, the British Evidence Act of 1872 remained applicable in Pakistan—which otherwise lacked laws targeting gender discrimination in the legal system. Since the 1970s when the process of Islamization under General Zia Ul Haq started in Pakistan, many laws have been altered according to Islamic Sharia. As part of the same process, the Evidence Act was replaced by Qanun-e-Shahada on 26 October 1984, though it did not come into effect until 1987. As of that year, in cases of Hadd, the evidence of women is not admissible. Further, in cases involving financial or other future obligations, written instructions and documents must be attested to by either two men or one man and two women. In other legal proceedings it is left to the judge's discretion whether to admit a woman's testimony as equal.

== Other ==
In 2021 the Lahore High Court banned the use of virginity tests in cases where women claim they were raped.

== See also ==
- National Commission on Status of Women
- Women's Protection Bill
- Women in Pakistan
- Hudood Ordinances
- Sharia
- Hermeneutics of feminism in Islam
- Islamic feminism
- Acid Survivors Trust International
- Acid throwing
- Aurat March
- Divorce in Pakistan
- Feminism in Pakistan
- Honour killing in Pakistan
- Jirga
- Me Too movement (Pakistan)
- Modesty patrol
- Polygamy in Pakistan
- Hindu marriage laws in Pakistan
- Rape in Pakistan
- Swara
- Vani
- Women's organisations based in Pakistan
- Women's rights in Pakistan
- Category:Pakistani women lawyers
- Coerced religious conversion in Pakistan

General:

- Human rights in Pakistan
- Women in Islam
- Women's rights
- Muslim personal law
- Punjab Commission on the Status of Women
- Status of women's testimony in Islam
- Pakistan penal code
