= Bharatiya Muslim Mahila Andolan =

Indian Muslim women's organisation

- Abbreviation: BMMA
- Founded: 2011
- Type: Non-governmental organization
- Purpose: Women Empowerment, Poverty Reduction
- Location: India
- Region served: Uttar Pradesh, India
- Key people: Zakia Soman, Noorjehan Safia Niaz
- Website: https://bmmaindia.com/

Bharatiya Muslim Mahila Andolan or BMMA (transl. Indian Muslim Women's Movement) is an autonomous, secular, rights-based mass organization led by Zakia Soman which fights for the citizenship rights of the Muslim women in India. The BMMA was formed in January 2011. The organisation is based in Mumbai.

By 2016, the organisation boasted of over 100,000 members in 15 states.

BMMA conducted a Study of Muslim women's views on reforms in Muslim personal law— 'Seeking Justice Within the Family' across 10 states that revealed that an overwhelming 82% of the over 4,000 women who were surveyed had no property in their name and that 78% were home makers with no income of their own.

"It is quite revealing that 95.5% poor women had not even heard of the All India Muslim Personal Law Board, yet the government and the people go by the decisions taken by these self-proclaimed leaders of the Muslim community," said Zakia Soman, co-founder of the Bharatiya Muslim Mahila Andolan.

Noorjehan Safia Niaz, co-founder of the Bhartiya Muslim Mahila Andolan (BMMA) does not support practices such as the hijab and believes that instances where complete strangers — young and old men, and once a younger woman — walk up to her in public and question her choice of dressing with impunity and audacity, violate her personal space.

BMMA has backed Hindu women in the Shani Shingnapur Temple row.

== Campaigns ==
=== Codification of Muslim family laws ===
One of the main demands of BMMA is to codify Muslim family laws, encompassing laws to fix age of marriage, matters of property, and guardianship of children. As per Noorjehan, co-founder of BMMA, "If every community has its own codified law [for example, the Hindus have the Hindu Marriage Act, Parsis have the Parsi Marriage and Divorce Act] then why not the same for Muslims?"

=== Ban on Triple talaq ===
The BMMA demanded a ban on the practice of 'Triple Talaq' (verbal divorce). A nationwide survey by BMMA found that over 90% of Muslim women opposed verbal divorce. A signature campaign to end the practice gathered 50,000 votes.

It also petitioned the Indian Prime Minister Narendra Modi on Muslim Personal Law. Eventually, Triple talaq in India was banned. On 30 July 2019, the Parliament of India declared the practice of Triple Talaq illegal and unconstitutional and made it a punishable act from 1 August 2019.

=== Women's entry into the inner sanctum of the Haji Ali Dargah ===
BMMA also challenged the restrictions on women's entry into the inner sanctum of the Haji Ali Dargah of Mumbai, and on 26 August 2016 after a three year legal battle, the Bombay High Court, allowed women entry and termed the ban unconstitutional.

=== Abolition of Polygamy, Mut'a marriages, Misyar marriages and Nikah halala ===
On June 23, 2014, BMMA released a draft, 'Muslim Marriage and Divorce Act' recommending that polygamy be made illegal in the Muslim Personal Law of India.

On December 12, 2022, on a public interest litigation filed by BMMA, the Supreme Court of India issued notices to the centre and Law Commission of India requesting the abolition of practices of polygamy and other practices like Mut'a marriages, Misyar marriages and Nikah halala as they violate fundamental rights of the Muslim women in India under articles 14, 15, 21 and 25 of the Constitution.

== Female Qazis ==
In 2016, the Bharatiya Muslim Mahila Andolan (BMMA) founded the Darul Uloom Niswan with the aim to train female qazis with the skills needed to challenge the misuse of authority by mullahs who had been issuing fatwas, supporting unilateral triple talaq, and promoting practices such as 'nikah halala', often leading to exploitation and abuse of power. The female qazis oversee sharia courts, solemnise marriages, mediate in marital and inheritance disputes, and provide counseling for women dealing with domestic violence.

== Report on women in polygamous marriages ==
In December 2022, the BMMA released a report 'Status of women in polygamous marriages and need for legal protection' based on the study of women whose husbands are in polygamous marriages, across 11 states in India. According to the report, 84% of respondents said polygamy should be prohibited, and 73% thought a husband should be penalised for taking a second wife. The Survey also found that 45% of the husbands threatened to divorce their first wives if they disapproved of his second marriage. An overwhelming number of women said that they felt a sense of betrayal, loss of dignity and loss of self-respect when the husband married other women despite her being the wife. The poll found that many of the women suffered from serious mental health problems and 50% of the 289 women reported suffering from mental trauma such as depression, self-blaming and suicidal tendencies.

== See also ==
- Islam in India
- Muslim Personal Law
- Women in Islam
