= Farha Khatun =

Indian editor, documentary filmmaker

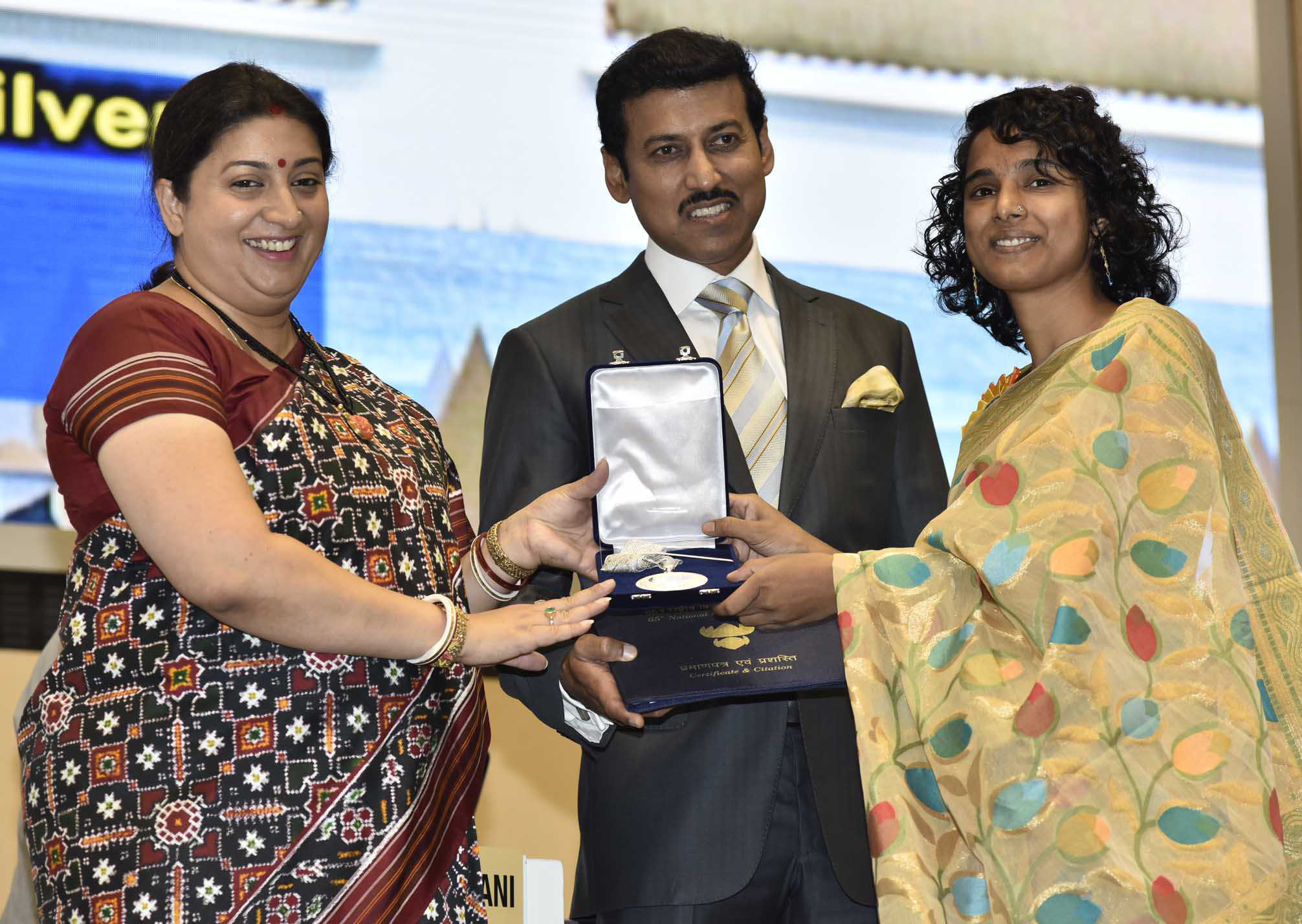
- Education: Roopkala Kendro
- Occupations: Documentary Filmmaker, Editor
- Years active: 2014 – present
- Notable work: Holy Rights
- Awards: National Film award for Social Issues

Farha Khatun is an Indian editor and documentary filmmaker known for directing the documentary Holy Rights which won Best Film on Social Issues at the 67th National Film Awards. In 2024, jurry member for Indian Documentary Section at Kolkata International Film Festival.

She also Co-directed the Documentary I am Bonnie which also won Best Film on Social Issues at 65th National Film Awards.

She has also acted in 'Abar Jodi Ichchha Karo... (If you dare Desire...)',- a 2017 film directed by Debalina Majumdar and written by Susmita Sinha.

== Filmography ==
Year	Title	Role	Notes	Ref
2014	Uncle: A School In Himself	Editor		
2016	I am Bonnie	Director, Editor	Won National Film awards for Best Film on Social Issue	
2018	The Jungle Man... Loiya	Director, Editor		
2020	Holy Rights	Director	Won National Film awards for Best Film on Social Issue	
2022	Ripples Under the Skin	Director, Editor		

== Awards ==
=== I am Bonnie ===
- National Film Award For Best Film On Social Issue.
- Special Jury Mention' at Mumbai International Film Festival (MIFF)
- ‘Best Documentary’ at Kolkata International Film Festival

=== Holy Rights ===
- National Film Award For Best Film On Social Issue.
