= Muslim Women (Protection of Rights on Marriage) Act, 2019 =

Indian law on triple talaq

Lok Sabha
- Long title: An Act to protect the rights of married Muslim women and to prohibit divorce by pronouncing talaq by their husbands and to provide for matters connected there with or incidental thereto.
- Citation: Act No. 20 of 2019
- Territorial extent: India
- Considered by: Parliament of India
- Enacted by: Lok Sabha
- Enacted by: Rajya Sabha
- Assented to: 31 July 2019
- Commenced: 19 September 2018

Initiating chamber: Lok Sabha
- Bill citation: Bill No. 247 of 2019
- Introduced by: Ravi Shankar Prasad (Ministry of Law and Justice)
- Status: In force

The Muslim Women (Protection of Rights on Marriage) Act, 2019 is an Act of the Parliament of India criminalizing triple talaq in Muslim marriage. In August 2017, the Supreme Court of India declared triple talaq, which enables Muslim men to instantly divorce their wives, to be unconstitutional. The minority opinion suggested the Parliament to consider appropriate legislation governing triple talaq in the Muslim community.

In December 2017, citing the Supreme Court judgment and cases of triple talaq in India, the government introduced the Muslim Women (Protection of Rights on Marriage) Bill, 2017. The bill proposed to make triple talaq in any form—spoken, in writing, or by electronic means—illegal and void. Punishment for breach of the law was proposed to include up to three years imprisonment for the husband pronouncing triple talaq. The bill was passed by the Lok Sabha, the lower house of the Parliament of India, on the same day, but was stalled by the opposition in the Rajya Sabha, the upper house.

The bill was reintroduced and passed by the Lok Sabha and by the Rajya Sabha in July 2019. Consequently, the bill received assent of the President of India. The act also entitles an aggrieved woman to demand a maintenance for her dependent children. It was subsequently notified as law in the same month. The act stands to be retrospectively effective from 19 September 2018.

However, Muslim men are still allowed to be polygamous and can also give a divorce easily by paying paltry sums.

== History ==
The 2017 bill was passed by the Lok Sabha on 27 December 2018. However, in the Rajya Sabha the opposition demanded it to be sent to the Standing Committee. As the bill was not passed during the parliamentary session, the ordinance that had temporarily put it into effect expired on 22 January 2019. The government re-promulgated an identical bill on 10 January 2019. This bill was passed in the Lok Sabha but was again stalled in the Rajya Sabha. The bill lapsed again when the Parliamentary session adjourned sine die in April 2019.

The Muslim Women (Protection of Rights on Marriage) Ordinance, 2019 was to expire on 29 August 2019, six weeks after start of parliamentary session following the 2019 Indian general elections. The government introduced a new bill in the Lok Sabha on 21 June 2019. It was passed by the Lok Sabha on 25 July 2019 and by the Rajya Sabha on 30 July 2019. The bill was assented to by the President Ram Nath Kovind on 31 July 2019. It was subsequently notified in the gazette on the same day. The act is retrospectively effective from 19 September 2018.

=== The Muslim Women (Protection of Rights on Marriage) Bill, 2017 ===
The government had formulated the bill claiming 100 cases of instant triple talaq, since the Supreme Court judgement in August 2017 prohibiting triple talaq in India. On 28 December 2017, the Lok Sabha had passed the Muslim Women (Protection of Rights on Marriage) Bill, 2017. The bill proposed to make triple talaq in any form — spoken, in writing or by electronic means such as email, SMS and instant messengers illegal and void, with up to three years imprisonment for the husband who pronounces triple talaq. The Communist Party of India (Marxist), Rashtriya Janata Dal, All India Majlis-e-Ittehadul Muslimeen, Biju Janata Dal, All India Anna Dravida Munnetra Kazhagam and Indian Union Muslim League opposed the bill, calling it arbitrary and faulty, while the Indian National Congress supported the bill.

=== The Muslim Women (Protection of Rights on Marriage) Bill, 2018 ===
Later, the Muslim Women (Protection of Rights on Marriage) Bill (2018) was proposed which intended to protect Muslim women. The bill was passed in 2018 and 2019 by the Lok Sabha, but lapsed after not being passed by the Rajya Sabha.

On 19 September 2018, noting that the practice of instant triple talaq had continued unabated despite the 2017 judicial mandate, the government issued The Muslim Women (Protection of Rights on Marriage) Ordinance, 2018. An ordinance introduced into the Indian parliament lapses if either the Parliament does not approve it within six weeks of reassembly, or if disapproving resolutions are passed by both houses. Hence, a new bill named The Muslim Women (Protection of Rights on Marriage) Bill, 2018 was introduced in the Lok Sabha by Union Law Minister, Ravi Shankar Prasad.

=== The Muslim Women (Protection of Rights on Marriage) Ordinance, 2019 ===
As the triple talaq ordinance of 2018 was to expire on 22 January 2019 and also because The Muslim Women (Protection of Rights on Marriage) Bill, 2018 could not be passed, the government repromulgated the ordinance on 10 January 2019. On 12 January 2019, the president approved the 2019 ordinance.

=== The Muslim Women (Protection of Rights on Marriage) Act, 2019 ===
The Muslim Women (Protection of Rights on Marriage) Ordinance, 2019 was repealed on 31 July 2019 when the bill was passed by both houses of the legislature, Lok Sabha and Rajya Sabha, and was notified by the President of India in the official gazette, and thus became an Act of Parliament. The Act has 8 sections.

== Scholarly and Theological Context ==
=== Historical Contestations of Triple Talaq ===
While the 2019 Act is often viewed through the lens of contemporary Indian politics, the practice of instant triple talaq has been historically contested within Islamic jurisprudence for centuries. The practice is not universally accepted across all Islamic schools of thought, and historical Sunni scholars frequently debated its validity. The prominent medieval jurist Ibn Taymiyya famously used ijtihad (independent legal reasoning) to issue fatwas that delegitimized the practice of irrevocable, simultaneous triple divorce. He viewed the practice as a harmful innovation that departed from the proper ethical guidelines of Islamic divorce. His rulings on this matter demonstrate that opposition to instant triple talaq has deep roots in internal Islamic debate, rather than being a purely modern or external critique.

=== Colonial Roots and Anglo-Muhammadan Law ===
To understand the rigid nature of Muslim personal law in India leading up to the 2019 Act, it is necessary to look at the country's colonial past. During British rule, colonial administrators created a hybrid legal system known as "Anglo-Muhammadan law". As scholar Sohaira Siddiqui outlines in her research on Islamic law under colonialism, British judges and administrators disrupted existing, fluid local traditions. Instead of consulting living Islamic scholarship, the British relied on rigid English translations of a few classical texts to create a strict and inflexible legal code. This process of juridical colonization essentially froze Muslim family law in India, making it incredibly difficult to reform patriarchal practices organically, and setting the stage for the modern codification issues that still impact Indian Muslims today.

=== The Shah Bano Precedent and Maintenance (Nafaqa) ===
The debates surrounding the 2019 Act are directly tied to earlier legal controversies in India, most notably the 1985 Shah Bano case and the subsequent Muslim Women (Protection of Rights on Divorce) Act of 1986. A central tension in these historical cases was the conflict over a woman's right to post-divorce maintenance (nafaqa). The core dispute centered on whether secular Indian law should override Muslim personal law regarding financial support for divorced women. As historian M. Qasim Zaman points out, these ongoing legal battles over state intervention and women's legal rights highlight the deep internal criticisms and struggles over religious authority within modern South Asian Islam.

=== Modern Feminist Legal Anthropology ===
In contemporary scholarship, the movement to abolish patriarchal practices like instant triple talaq is heavily supported by Islamic feminists and legal anthropologists. Scholars such as Ziba Mir-Hosseini advocate for egalitarian Muslim family laws by drawing a firm distinction between Shari'a and fiqh. In this framework, Shari'a represents the divine, egalitarian principles found in the Quran, while fiqh represents the human—and historically patriarchal—efforts of jurists to deduce and apply laws. By separating the two, modern reformers argue that laws permitting instant triple talaq are outdated human Fiqh rather than divine Shari'a, giving Muslim women a theological and legal basis to demand gender parity from within their faith tradition.

=== The Role of Ijtihad in Modern Reform ===
A crucial element in understanding the legal debates surrounding the 2019 Act is the historical and ongoing tension between taqlid (strict adherence to traditional legal schools) and ijtihad (independent legal reasoning). The modern push to reform Muslim personal law in India often relies on reopening the practice of ijtihad to adapt jurisprudence to contemporary social needs. Historically, scholars like Ibn Taymiyya utilized ijtihad to break away from the rigid boundaries of established legal schools. Today, the language of ijtihad is frequently invoked by modern reformers. They use this traditional framework of internal criticism to evaluate outdated colonial-era codifications of family law and to advocate for women's rights from within the Islamic tradition. By framing the abolition of instant triple talaq as a modern exercise in ijtihad, reformers demonstrate that updating family law is a dynamic, internal Islamic process rather than a purely secular disruption.

== Provisions ==
The act statutorily provides:

- Any pronouncement of talaq by a Muslim husband upon his wife, by words, either spoken or written or in electronic form or in any other manner whatsoever, shall be void and illegal.
- Any Muslim husband who pronounces talaq upon his wife shall be punished with imprisonment for a term which may extend to three years, and shall also be liable to fine.
- A married Muslim woman upon whom talaq is pronounced shall be entitled to receive from her husband such amount of subsistence allowance, for her and dependent children, as may be determined by the Magistrate.
- A married Muslim woman shall be entitled to custody of her minor children in the event of pronouncement of talaq by her husband, in such manner as may be determined by the Magistrate.
- An offence punishable under this Act shall be cognizable, if information relating to the commission of the offence is given to an officer in charge of a police station by the married Muslim woman upon whom talaq is pronounced or any person related to her by blood or marriage;
- An offence punishable under this Act shall be compoundable, at the instance of the married Muslim woman upon whom talaq is pronounced with the permission of the Magistrate, on such terms and conditions as he may determine;
- No person accused of an offence punishable under this Act shall be released on bail unless the Magistrate, on an application filed by the accused and after hearing the married Muslim woman upon whom talaq is pronounced, is satisfied that there are reasonable grounds for granting bail to such person.

== Impact ==
The reality on the ground has not changed after the judgement. Even after five years since Supreme Court’s invalidation of triple talaq, the women petitioners who were abandoned by their husbands, continue to live a life of half-divorcees. Muslim men have found loopholes to get around the ban. Cases of torturing the wife have risen in order to obtain a khula. The number of cases where Muslim men abandoned their wives has also increased since the judgement.

== See also ==
- The Muslim Women (Protection of Rights on Divorce) Act 1986
- Triple talaq in India
- Muslim Women Rights Day
