= Divorce in Pakistan =

Divorce in Pakistan is mainly regulated under the Dissolution of Muslim Marriage Act 1939 amended in 1961 and the Family Courts Act 1964. Similar to global trends, divorce rate is increasing gradually in Pakistan too. In Punjab (Pakistan), in 2014 khula cases registered were 16,942 that rose to 18,901 cases in 2016.

In 2019 in Karachi 11,143 cases were filed, 2020 first quarter 3,800 cases filed, one and half year preceding to June 2020 cases filed were 14,943; out of which 4,752 disposed of effecting 2,000 women divorced in 2019 affecting 2100 children.

According to Aizbah Khan of Bol news, Pakistan's former prime minister Imran Khan holds popularity of Hollywood and Bollywood films to be responsible for increase in divorce rate in Pakistan.

== Legal provisions and issues ==
According to Pakistani conservative Islamic scholarship provision of giving written notice to spouse for divorce is incompatible with Islamic laws and practices and they pressure the government to revoke such provisions. Section 10 (4) of the Family Courts Act, October 2005 provides for divorce procedure.

Under the Dissolution of Muslim Marriages Act, 1939, a Muslim wife may petition a Family Court for judicial dissolution of her marriage on specified grounds — including cruelty, failure to maintain her for two years, the husband's imprisonment, impotence, and desertion — without requiring her husband's consent, a principle established by the Supreme Court of Pakistan in Khurshid Bibi v. Baboo Muhammad Amin (PLD 1967 SC 97). This fault-based route is distinct from khula granted solely on the ground of the wife's aversion: under Section 10(5) of the Family Courts Act 1964, khula simpliciter ordinarily requires the wife to relinquish part of her dower as consideration, whereas dissolution granted on a proven fault ground under Section 2 of the 1939 Act entitles her to retain her dower in full under Section 5 of that Act.

In July 2026, the Lahore High Court held that "cruelty" under Section 2(viii) of the 1939 Act is not confined to physical violence and extends to psychological, verbal, emotional, and economic abuse, to be assessed by its cumulative effect on the particular wife. The court further ruled that a Family Court cannot convert a suit pleaded and proved on a cruelty ground into a khula decree — with its accompanying dower forfeiture — without the wife's informed consent, and clarified that a 2022 Federal Shariat Court verdict had struck down only the mechanical dower-forfeiture formula, not the underlying distinction between the two routes to dissolution.

For the Hindus, divorce was legalized in Sindh in 2018 when Sindh Hindu marriage act was amended to add divorce and remarriage rights for Hindu couples.

== Reason for divorce ==
Prolonged illness, infertility, disability, chronic illness, and mental health issues are some of the reasons for divorces along with western influence, decreasing trust and tolerance vis a vis the joint family system, unemployment, and financial stress, decreasing religious value education too are some of the reasons for an increase in the divorce rate in Pakistan. A culture of strong joint family connections in Pakistan can lead to interference from joint family members that intensifies marital discord. Azher and Hafiza study on smaller sample size attribute reasons to in-laws interference, lack of mutual understanding, financial exploitation, and torturous environment.

=== Domestic Violence and its prevalence ===
Intimate partner violence, also known as domestic violence, is a major cause for the breakup of marriages in Pakistan.

=== US and western influence ===
Shazia Ramzan and Saira Akhtar ascribe multinational job opportunities and study scholarships for Pakistani women as reasons for the increase in the divorce rate in Pakistan; Murtaza Haider questions such anti-western theories, pointing out that few women have access to overseas study. Haider suggests to stopping domestic violence against wives will reduce divorce in Pakistan.

=== Extra marital relationships ===
Pakistani spouses consider extra marital affairs as unforgettable and unforgivable act which leads to divorce situations

=== Sexual Dysfunction ===
As per Khan, Sikander, Akhlaq while some women complained of their respective spouses being impotent or gay.

== Difficulties in availing remedies ==
Mohsina Munir and Tahira AbdulQuddus did a study of 500 female petitioners and found that these petitioners usually faced problems on account of very long suits, very costly expenses, insufficient awareness of legal provisions and lack of ease of legal support, insufferable false accusations, bribery, nepotism, unjust action taken on legal requirements and fake witnesses.

== Effects ==
As per to ‘Global Gender Gap Index 2018’, Pakistan scored 148 of 149 countries in terms of gender parity across four areas: education, health, economic opportunity, and political empowerment, that means women in Pakistan substantially miss on emotional and financial support and makes them helpless in marital discord situations. Still women are stigmatized even if cause and decision of divorce is not her mistake. Children of separated parents have to struggle more to find his life partner in Pakistan.

In the 2023 Global Gender Gap Report, Pakistan was ranked 142 of 146 total countries in terms of overall gender parity.

=== Health ===
Women suffer insomnia, depression, anxiety, and panic attacks whereas men suffer psychologically for the longingness of their children. Distrust and loneliness are faced equally by both.

== Divorce compensation ==
According to Sulema Jahangir due to politically influential conservative mindset spread by Islamist clergy in south Asia many Muslim women bear with abusive marriages to avoid risk of finding themselves on the street. It is not western influences or women behavior responsible for increasing divorce rate in Pakistan but cost of breaking up marriage to Pakistani male is minimal. Maintenance awarded to children is minimal, and even after giving lifetime service to her family, women don't get share in income or assets of their parting husband. Sulema Jahangir says modern International standards and Convention on the Elimination of all Forms of Discrimination Against Women expect divorce proceedings to count women's non-financial contributions to a marriage. Many other Muslim countries from Indonesia to Turkey are moving forwards in incorporating suitable legislations improving financial compensation to divorcee wives as mata’a (compensation of kindness) or haq meher (rightful mandatory compensation) through Nikah nama sharing husbands income and assets to better much levels (30 to 50% of assets while departing) also taking into account their non-financial contributions to the family, but Pakistan is lagging behind in social emancipation of divorcing wives.

== In literature, drama and media ==
A placard slogan “Divorced and happy!” at Aurat March (an International women's day march held since 2018) which intended to challenge social stigmatization, negative perception and discrimination of divorcee women conducive for continuation of abusive marriages came in public discourse on social media, also in mainstream media. 2019 Pakistani TV drama named Meray Paas Tum Ho encompassing debate surrounding marital relationships getting estranged with foregrounding of romantic extramarital relationship, caught Pakistani national attention. Referring to placard slogan “Divorced and happy!” Dawn images column says that Pakistani children are made to witness depressed, loveless, toxic marriages, while men too are responsible for divorces only women are held responsible and stigmatized, while as per the Human Rights Commission of Pakistan, percentage of married women have experienced sexual abuse, particularly domestic rape is up to 47%.

== See also ==
- Family planning in Pakistan
- Marriage in Pakistan
- Divorce in Islam
- Women in Pakistan
- Women related laws in Pakistan
