= Divorce in Islam =

Divorce according to Islamic law can occur in a variety of forms, some initiated by a husband and some by a wife. The main categories of Islamic customary law are talaq (repudiation), khulʿ (mutual divorce) and faskh (dissolution of marriage before the Religious Court). Historically, the rules of divorce were governed by sharia, as interpreted by traditional Islamic jurisprudence, though they differed depending on the legal school, and historical practices sometimes diverged from legal theory.

In modern times, as personal status (family) laws have been codified in Muslim-majority states, they generally have remained "within the orbit of Islamic law", but control over the norms of divorce shifted from traditional jurists to the state.

== Quranic principles ==
According to the Quran, marriage is intended to be permanent, as indicated by its characterization as a "firm bond" and by the rules governing divorce. The relationship between the spouses should ideally be based on love (30:21) and important decisions concerning both spouses should be made by mutual consent. When marital harmony cannot be attained, the Quran allows spouses to bring the marriage to an end, although this decision is not to be taken lightly, and the families of the spouses are called upon to intervene by appointing arbiters to attempt a reconciliation. The Quran also sets waiting periods to discourage hasty divorces. For a menstruating woman, the waiting (Iddah) period before the divorce is finalized, as three monthly periods. For post-menopause women and non menstruating women, the waiting period is three months. This is to ensure the woman is not pregnant and thus guarantee the paternity of future children she may have with her next husband, and to give the husband time to reconsider his decision. Moreover, a man who vows not to have sexual intercourse with his wife, which would lead to automatic divorce, is allowed a four-month period to break his oath.

The Quran substantially reformed the gender inequity of divorce practices that existed in pre-Islamic Arabia, although some patriarchical elements survived and others flourished during later centuries. Before Islam, divorce among the Arabs was governed by unwritten customary law, which varied according to region and tribe, and its observance depended on the authority of the individuals and groups involved. In this system, women were particularly vulnerable. The Quranic rules of marriage and divorce provided a fixed set of norms for all Muslims, backed by divine authority and enforced by the community. The early Islamic reforms included giving the wife a possibility to initiate divorce, abrogation of the husband's claim to his wife's property, condemnation of divorce without compelling reason, criminalizing unfounded claims of infidelity made by the husband, and institution of financial responsibilities of the husband toward his divorced wife. In pre-Islamic times, men kept their wives in a state of "limbo" by continually repudiating them and taking them back at will. The Quran limited the number of repudiations to three, after which the man cannot take his wife back unless she first marries another man. Additionally, the pre-Islamic bridewealth (mahr), which was paid by the groom to the bride's family, was transformed into a dower, which became property of the wife, though some scholars believe that the practice of giving at least a part of the mahr to the bride began shortly before the advent of Islam.

The subject of divorce is addressed in four different surahs of the Quran, including the general principle articulated in 2:231:

If you divorce women, and they reach their appointed term, hold them back in amity or let them go in amity. Do not hold them back out of malice, to be vindictive. Whoever does this does himself injustice.

== Classical sharia ==
=== Legal context ===
Classical Islamic law is derived from the scriptural sources of Islam (Quran and hadith) using various methodologies developed by different legal schools. It was historically interpreted by jurists (muftis) who were expected to give a legal opinion (fatwa) free of charge in response to any query. Family disputes are handled in a religious court, presided over by a judge (qadi) who had enough legal education to decide some legal questions, and queried a mufti if faced with a difficult legal issue. The judges were active members of the local community and were also involved in informal arbitration, which was the preferred method of resolving disputes. In court proceedings, they mediated between the letter of the law and exigences of the local social and moral concerns, with the overarching aim of ensuring social harmony. Actual legal practice sometimes deviated from the precepts of the legal school that was dominant in the area, at times to women's benefit, and at times to their disadvantage. Members of all social classes and their witnesses argued their cases in court without professional legal representation, though members of the upper class generally did so through a representative. Women were commonly involved in litigation, usually as plaintiffs, were assertive in arguing their cases, and they were often treated sympathetically by the judge. According to legal doctrine, a woman's testimony in some areas of law carried half the weight of that of a man, though available evidence suggests that practical effects of this rule were limited, and the legal standing of women in pre-modern Islam was comparable to or higher than that of their European contemporaries.

=== Talaq (repudiation) ===
==== Jurisprudence ====
The term talaq is commonly translated as "repudiation" or simply "divorce". In classical Islamic law it refers to the husband's right to dissolve the marriage by simply announcing to his wife that he repudiates her. Classical jurists variously classified pronouncement of talaq as forbidden or reprehensible unless it was motivated by a compelling cause such as impossibility of cohabitation due to irreconcilable conflict, though they did not require the husband to obtain court approval or provide a justification. The jurists imposed certain restrictions on valid repudiation. For example, the declaration must be made in clear terms; the husband must be of sound mind and not coerced. Upon talaq, the wife is entitled to the full payment of mahr if it had not already been paid. The husband is obligated to financially support her until the end of the waiting period or the delivery of her child, if she is pregnant. In addition, she has a right to child support and any past due maintenance, which Islamic law requires to be paid regularly in the course of marriage.

Giving the husband a prerogative of repudiation was based on the assumption that men would have no interest in initiating a divorce without good cause, given the financial obligations it would incur. Additionally, classical jurists were of the opinion that "the female nature is wanting in rationality and self-control". Requiring a justification was seen as being potentially detrimental to the reputation of both spouses, since it might expose family secrets to public scrutiny.

Talaq is considered in Islam to be a reprehensible means of divorce. The initial declaration of talaq is a revocable repudiation (ṭalāq rajʿah) which does not terminate the marriage. The husband can revoke the repudiation at any time during the waiting period (iddah) which lasts three full menstrual cycles. The waiting period is intended to give the couple an opportunity for reconciliation, and also a means to ensure that the wife is not pregnant. Resumption of sexual relations automatically retracts the repudiation. The wife retains all her rights during the waiting period. The divorce becomes final when the waiting period expires. This is called a "minor" divorce (al-baynuna al-sughra) and the couple can remarry. If the husband repudiates his wife for the third time, it triggers a "major" divorce (al-baynuna al-kubra), after which the couple cannot remarry without an intervening consummated marriage to another man. This is known as tahlil or nikah halala. Making the third pronouncement irrevocable prevents the husband from using repeated declarations and revocations of divorce as a means of pressuring his wife into making financial concessions in order to "purchase her freedom". It also acts as a deterrent to rash repudiations.

==== Practice ====
Women often entered marriage with substantial capital in the form of mahr and the trousseau provided by their family, which they were not obliged to spend on family expenses, and they frequently loaned money to their husbands. Because of this, and the financial obligations incurred, talaq could be a very costly and in many cases financially ruinous enterprise for the husband. Many repudiated women used the divorce payment to buy their ex-husband's share in the family house. In the historical record talaq appears to have been less common than khul'.

Available evidence from Mamluk Egypt indicates that talaq was not the principal means of divorce. Talaq was considered to be disastrous for the woman because it deprived her of long-term protection and financial support, preventing her from remarrying, since this would cause her to lose child custody. This led to repudiation without good reason being considered socially improper. Studies of the Ottoman Levant showed that women could invalidate a declaration of talaq by stating that the husband had shown signs of "diminished rationality" when he made it, while others used a husband's unrevoked declaration of talaq to obtain divorce at a later date if they could prove that he made it.

==== Talaq al-bid'ah and triple talaq ====
Talaq types can be classified into talaq al-sunnah, which is thought to be in accordance with Muhammad's teachings, and talaq al-bid'ah, which are viewed as a bid'ah (innovation) deviations from it. Talaq al-sunnah is further subdivided into talaq al-ahsan, which is the least disapproved form of talaq, and talaq al-hasan. The ahsan talaq involves a single revocable pronouncement of divorce and sexual abstinence during the waiting period. The hasan divorce involves three pronouncements made during the wife's state of ritual purity with menstrual periods intervening between them, and no intercourse having taken place during that time.

In contrast to talaq al-sunnah, talaq al-bid'ah does not observe the waiting period and irrevocably terminates the marriage. It may involve a "triple talaq", i.e., the declaration of talaq repeated three times, or a different formula such as "you are haram for me". Some legal schools held that a triple talaq performed in a single meeting constituted a "major" divorce, while others classified it as a "minor" divorce. Talaq al-bid'ah reflects pre-Islamic divorce customs rather than Quranic principles, and it is considered to be a particularly disapproved, though legally valid form of divorce in traditional Sunni jurisprudence. According to Islamic tradition, Muhammad denounced the practice of triple talaq, and the second caliph Umar punished husbands who made use of it.

Shiite jurisprudence does not recognize talaq al-bid'ah.

==== Tafwid (delegated talaq) ====
The husband can delegate the right of repudiation to his wife. This delegation can be made at the time of drawing up the marriage contract (nikah) or during the marriage, with or without conditions. Many women included such terms in their marriage contracts. Commonly, the contract gave the wife the right to "repudiate herself" if the husband married a second wife. Delegated repudiation is called ṭalāq al-tafawud or tafwid.

=== Khulʿ (mutual divorce) ===
==== Jurisprudence ====
Khulʿ is a contractual type of divorce that is initiated by the wife. It is justified on the authority of verse 2:229:

It is not licit for you to take back anything you have given them unless the two of them fear that they cannot conform to the bounds of God, no blame attaches to them both. If the woman gives back that with which she sets herself free. These are the bounds set by God; do not transgress them.

It is further based on a hadith in which Muhammad instructs a man to agree to his wife's wish of divorce if she gives back a garden received from him as part of her mahr. A khul' is concluded when the couple agrees to a divorce in exchange for a monetary compensation paid by the wife, which cannot exceed the value of the mahr she had received, and is generally a smaller sum or involves forfeiting the still unpaid portion. Hanafis and Malikis do not require a compensation paid by the wife. The divorce is final and irrevocable, effective when the contract is concluded. The couple cannot reconcile during the waiting period, defined as in the case of talaq, but the husband is required to pay maintenance during its term, unless the requirement is waived by the contract. As in the case of talaq, remarriage is possible until a khul' is concluded for a third time. If the husband pressures his wife to agree to khul' instead of pronouncing talaq, which would let him avoid attendant financial responsibilities, the divorce is considered to be invalid. Like talaq, khulʿ takes place out of court.

==== Practice ====
Relative frequency of khul' has been noted in studies of Istanbul, Anatolia, Syria, Muslim Cyprus, Egypt and Palestine.

In studies of Mamluk Egypt and the Balkans under Ottoman rule, khul' was shown to have been the principal means of divorce. Women employed a number of strategies to force a settlement from their husbands. Some neglected their marital and household duties, making family life impossible for the husband. Others demanded immediate payment of the deferred mahr, knowing that the husband had no means to comply and would be jailed if he failed to do so.

In some cases the khul' contract involved no compensation from the wife, while in other cases women would waive all of their husband's financial obligations. According to studies of the Ottoman Levant, various court procedures were put in place to ensure that a khul' was not actually a talaq.

=== Nikah halala ===
==== Jurisprudence ====
Nikah halala (also known as tahleel marriage) is a practice in which a woman, after being divorced by triple talaq, marries another man, consummates the marriage, and gets divorced again in order to be able to remarry her former husband. However such marriages are forbidden in Islam, according to a Sahih graded Hadith which states that Muhammed cursed those who did such marriages.

=== Judicial divorce ===
==== Jurisprudence ====
A marriage can also be dissolved by means of judicial divorce. Either spouse can petition a qadi court to obtain judicial divorce, but they must have compelling grounds for dissolving the marriage. The court starts the process by appointing an arbitrator from each of their families in order to seek a mediated reconciliation. If this effort fails, the court adjudicates the dispute by apportioning fault for the breakdown of the marriage with the associated financial consequences. Examples of fault are cruelty; husband's failure to provide maintenance or pay the immediate installment of mahr; infidelity; desertion; moral or social incompatibility; certain ailments; and imprisonment harmful to the marriage. Judicial divorce can also be sought over violations of terms stipulated in the marriage contract. Different legal schools recognized different subsets of these grounds for divorce. The Maliki school, which recognized the widest range of grounds for divorce, also recognises wife's hatred for husband as a valid ground for divorce and stipulates a category of "harm" (ḍarar), which gave the judge significant discretion of interpretation.

==== Practice ====
In some areas under Ottoman rule it was hardly possible for women to obtain divorce except through khul' due to the restriction imposed by the prevailing Hanafi school, though some exceptions have been found. The most serious problem was abandonment, which was not recognized as grounds for judicial divorce. To address this, in some cases a man setting out for travel would leave his wife a letter authorizing talaq if he did not return within a specified period of time. In other cases, Hanafi judges invited a Maliki or Hanbali colleague to pronounce divorce, or the woman herself took the initiative to seek out a judge from one of these schools. The same approach was used to effect a divorce in cases of failure to provide maintenance. In the Ottoman Balkans a woman could file for divorce on the grounds that her husband was "not a good Muslim".

Since marriages between non-Muslim men and Muslim women are forbidden under Islamic law, when a married woman converted to Islam but her husband did not, the marriage would be considered void by Muslim authorities and the woman obtained custody of the children. Seventeenth-century sources indicate that non-Muslim women throughout the Ottoman Empire used this method to obtain a divorce.

=== Oaths ===
==== Jurisprudence ====
The husband can end marriage through three types of oaths: the oath of continence (īlāʿ and iẓhar), the denial of paternity (liʿan), and conditional ṭalāq. The first two types were pre-Islamic practices confirmed by the Quran (2:226–227 for ila, and 58:2–4 for izhar), which also makes clear that izhar is reprehensible despite being legally valid.

Ila is an oath whereby the husband vows to refrain from sexual relations with his wife for at least four months. If he fulfils his oath, the marriage is dissolved; if he breaks it, the marriage continues. In the izhar (or ẓihār) oath a man declares that his wife is as sexually prohibited to him as his mother. The husband is able to break the oath and resume the marriage. Breaking either oath requires expiation by means of feeding the poor or fasting.

In the li'an oath, the husband denies paternity of his wife's child. The wife is given an opportunity to take an oath denying infidelity, and if she does so and the husband persists in his accusation, the marriage is dissolved by a judge and the couple can never remarry.

In the oath of conditional ṭalāq, the husband declares that he will divorce his wife if he or she performs a certain act. This oath can serve as a protection for the wife or as a threat by the husband, depending on the specified act.

==== Practice ====
Studies of practices under Mamluk and Ottoman rule found no instances of the oaths of li'an or abstinence being used, while conditional talaq seems to have played a prominent role. It was used to issue various threats to the wife as well as to make promises. In Ottoman Egypt marriage contracts commonly included stipulations of conditional talaq which were not otherwise recognized by the prevailing Hanafi school as grounds for judicial divorce, such as non-payment of maintenance or marrying a second wife.

=== Other consequences of divorce ===
Islamic law does not recognize the concept of communal property, and division of property is based on its attribution to either spouse. The wife obtains custody of the children until their majority (whose definition varies according to legal school), while the father retains guardianship.

Child custody practices under Ottoman rule appear to have followed the rules of Hanafi jurisprudence, although in Ottoman Egypt children generally stayed with their divorced mother beyond the prescribed age. A divorced woman could keep custody of the children unless she remarried and her husband claimed custody, in which case it generally passed to one of her female relatives. Under the Mamluks, women could waive the right to child support in order to obtain extended custody.

=== Dower (mahr) in divorce ===
Mahr is a nuptial gift made by groom to the bride at the time of marriage. Upon receipt, it becomes her sole property with complete freedom of use and disposal. The marriage contract is not valid without the mahr. The amount of the mahr generally depended on the socio-economic status of the bride. The payment of a portion of the mahr was commonly deferred and served as a deterrent to the exercise of the right of unilateral divorce by the husband, although classical jurists disagreed about the permissibility and manner of deferring payment of the mahr.

Islamic jurisprudence has clear guidance on handling of mahr in the case of divorce, depending on who asks for the divorce and whether or not the intercourse occurred. If the husband asks for a divorce and intercourse has occurred or he had been alone with her, he pays full mahr; if the husband asks for a divorce and the intercourse has not occurred, the husband pays half the dower; if the wife asks for a divorce and intercourse has occurred, the husband pays half the mahr; and if the wife asks for a divorce and intercourse has not occurred, then no mahr is required to be paid by the husband.

== Modern era ==
=== Legal transformation ===
In the modern era, sharia-based laws were widely replaced by statutes based on European models, and its classical rules were largely retained only in personal status (family) laws. Different explanations have been proposed for this phenomenon. Several scholars have argued that because these laws are more extensively specified in the Quran and hadith than others, it has been difficult for believers to accept deviating from these rules. In contrast, Wael Hallaq sees it as a legacy of colonialism: changing family laws would have provided no benefit in colonial administration, and colonial powers promoted the theory that these laws were sacred to the population, advertising their preservation as a mark of respect, which in turn led to them being taken up as a point of reference in modern Muslim identity politics.

Important changes in family laws took place in the modern era. The laws underwent codification by legislative bodies and were also displaced from their original context into modern legal systems, which generally followed Western practices in court procedure and legal education. This severed them both from the classical interpretative tradition and from the institutional foundations of the pre-modern legal system into which they were embedded. In particular, control over the norms of divorce shifted from traditional jurists to the state, though they generally remained "within the orbit of Islamic law".

In her article 'An unequal partnership', Sulema Jahangir insists that, Convention on the Elimination of all Forms of Discrimination Against Women and other international standards expect that non-financial contributions of women to a marriage ought to be recognized to enable an equal standing between spouses. Many Muslim countries are finding ways and means to account for non-financial contributions of women to a marriage and improve divorce compensations. Some Muslim nations such as Jordan, Morocco, Algeria, Egypt, Syria, Libya and Tunisia, are effecting rules legislationes to pay additional compensation called 'mata'a' as part of Islamic kindness to departing spouses in addition to dower and maintenance. Many Muslim countries are adding conditions called 'haq meher' (right of financial maintenance and capital awards) in marriage contracts called nikahnama.

=== Methods of reform ===
Changing social conditions have led to increasing dissatisfaction with traditional Islamic law of divorce since the early 20th century. Various reforms have been undertaken in an attempt to restrict the husband's right of unilateral repudiation and give women greater ability to initiate divorce. These reforms have utilized a number of methods, of which the most important are:

- Selection among classical juristic opinions without restriction to a single legal school (takhayyur) during state law codification
- Extending discretionary powers of the court
- Administrative measures justified with reference to the classical doctrine of siyasa shar'iyya, which authorizes the ruler to enact policies in consideration of equity and expedience
- Imposition of penal sanctions
- Modernistic interpretation of Quranic scriptures (sometimes called neo-ijtihad and feminist tafsir)
- Appeal to the doctrine of public interest (maslaha)

According to Sulema Jahangir in Turkey, the revised Civil Code expects equal division of property and assets acquired during the marriage as the default property regime. In Indonesia and Singapore, the courts have the discretionary powers; in Indonesia courts can split the matrimonial property upon divorce to recognise women's non-financial contributions to the marriage where as in Singapore wife's contribution to family is taken into account, and even in absence of financial contribution 35% assets have to be shared with wife as contributing in caring for home and children, where as in Malaysia depending on length of marriage and each spouse's contribution a divorcing spouse can get up to one third share in assets.

The All India Muslim Personal Law Board issued a code of conduct in April 2017 regarding talaq in response to the controversy over the practice of triple talaq in India. It also warned that those who resort to triple talaq, or divorce recklessly, without justification or for reasons not prescribed under Shariat will be socially boycotted.

In India, The Muslim Women (Protection of Rights on Marriage) Act, 2019 was passed in July, 2019 which made instant triple talaq (talaq-e-biddah) in any form — spoken, written, or by electronic means — illegal, void, and punishable by up to three years imprisonment. Under the new law, an aggrieved woman is entitled to demand maintenance for her dependent children. India is among 23 countries that have banned triple talaq.

== Prevalence ==
According to Yossef Rapoport, in the 15th century, the rate of divorce was higher than it is today in the modern Middle East, which has generally lower rates of divorce. In 15th century Egypt, Al-Sakhawi recorded the marital history of 500 women, the largest sample on marriage in the Middle Ages, and found that at least a third of all women in the Mamluk Sultanate of Egypt and Syria married more than once, with many marrying three or more times. According to Al-Sakhawi, as many as three out of ten marriages in 15th century Cairo ended in divorce.

In the early 20th century, some villages in western Java and the Malay Peninsula had divorce rates as high as 70%.

At least in one 21st century country, India, with a large Muslim population (approximately 190 million in 2017), triple talaq was a very common form of divorce until its banning in August 2017. The Bharatiya Muslim Mahila Andolan (BMMA - Indian Muslim Women's Movement) which had run a vocal campaign against triple talaq leading up to its banning, conducted a survey of Muslim women (starting after 2007) and found that of the 4710 it surveyed, 525 were divorced, and of those 414 or 78% had been divorced through instant triple talaq.

== See also ==
- Annulment
- Annulment (Catholic Church)
- Divorce in Pakistan
- Get (divorce document)
- Holy Rights
