= Mahr =

Islamic marriage gift from groom to bride

In Islam, a mahr (in Arabic: مهر; Persian: مهريه; Bengali: দেনমোহর; Turkish: mihr; Swahili: mahari; Indonesian: mahar; also transliterated mehr, meher, denmohor, mehrieh, or mahriyeh) is the bride wealth obligation, in the form of money, possessions or teaching of verses from the Quran by the groom, to the bride in connection with an Islamic wedding. While the mahr is often money, it can also be anything agreed upon by the bride such as jewellery, home goods, furniture, a dwelling or some land. Mahr is typically specified in the marriage contract signed upon marriage.

"Dower" is the English translation that comes closest to Islamic meaning of mahr, as "dower" refers to the payment from the husband or his family to the wife, especially to support her in the event of his death, although subsequent to marriage the wife also acquires inheritance rights. However, mahr is distinct from dower in two ways: 1) mahr is legally required for all Islamic marriages while dower is optional, and 2) mahr is required to be specified at the time of marriage (when a certain amount is promised, if not paid immediately), while dower is not paid until the death of the husband. Mahr also can be classified as a form of "bridewealth", described by anthropologists as payments made from the kin of the groom to the kin of the bride; however, mahr is paid directly to the bride and not her parents. In fact, as her legal property, mahr establishes the bride's financial independence from her parents and in many cases from her husband, who has no legal claims to his wife's mahr.

The terms "dowry" and "bride price" are sometimes incorrectly used to translate mahr, but mahr differs from dowries in many other cultures. A dowry traditionally refers to money or possessions a woman brings forth to the marriage, usually provided by her parents or family; bride price refers to money or property paid by the groom or his family to the parents of a woman (but not to the woman herself) upon the marriage.

In the event the marriage contract does not contain an exact, specified mahr, the husband must still pay the wife an equitable sum. The requirement of a mahr is mentioned several times in the Quran and hadith.

The mahr is often paid to the bride in parts. The mahr amount given to the bride at the signing of the marriage contract is called a mu‘ajjal (معجل), paid at time of marriage (nikah), and the portion that is promised but deferred is called mu’ajjal (مؤجل), paid after the consummation of marriage. A deferred promise to pay does not make the full amount of the mahr any less legally required. There are differences between the nature of mahr, definition of proper contract and conditions of enforceability depending on the regional fiqh and school of Islamic jurisprudence.

== Etymology and history ==
The word Mahr is related to the Hebrew word “Mohar” and the Syriac word "Mahrā", meaning “bridal gift”, which originally meant “purchase-money”. The word implies a gift given voluntarily and not as a result of a contract, but in Muslim religious law it was declared a gift which the bridegroom has to give the bride when the contract of marriage is made and which becomes the property of the wife.

Among pre-Islamic Arabs, a bride price called Mahr was an essential condition for a legal marriage. The Mahr was given to the guardian (Wali) of the bride, such as her father, brother or another relative. In earlier times, the bride received no portion of the Mahr.

Some scholars believe that in the period shortly before Muhammad, the Mahr, or at least a part of it, was already given to the bride. A few others regard its transformation into wife's property as a "revolutionary" Quranic innovation, however, this is pre-dated by a similar historical transition of the equivalent Jewish "mohar".

In the Book of Deuteronomy of the Hebrew Bible, a betrothed couple became accountable to the law against adultery, a concept known as erusin, violation of which was also punishable by death though not fully considering them as married. One view is that the betrothal was effected simply by purchasing the girl from her father (or guardian). This price paid for her is known by the Hebrew term mohar (מוהר).

It was customary in biblical times for the Jewish bride and her father to be given parts of the mohar. Gradually, as in Islam, it lost its original meaning, and the custom arose of giving the mohar entirely to the bride rather than her father.

== Structure of mahr ==
A mahr is part of many Muslim marriage contracts. The mahr may be separated into two parts. First, there is the muqaddam, or the prompt mahr, which the wife must receive at or immediately after the marriage ceremony. The second part of the mahr, called the mu'akhar, is a deferred and promised amount, payable at any agreed upon date following the consummation of the marriage. Often the deferred amount is larger than the amount paid at marriage. In theory, the deferred amount is supposed to provide the wife with a means of support, and is associated with the death or divorce of the husband, however this is a more traditional rather than Islamic stance on the matter. The mu'akhar should be viewed as importantly as the initial dower payment as it is an obligation to be fulfilled by the husband and is considered debt if it is not given to the wife within the timeframe agreed upon between the couple.

The mahr in any Islamic marriage contract is a fundamental religious right of the wife, and the husband may not reduce the mahr. Even upon the husband's death, the deferred mahr is paid from his estate before all other debts, because it is a religious requirement.

According to a hadith, the Muslim Prophet Muhammad stated the mahr should be "one gold piece", but the mahr amount is often negotiated between the parents or guardians of the bride and groom (also called wali), and the parties often draft mahr agreements by filling in the blanks of form contracts that employ standard boilerplate terms. The typical mahr containing marriage contract consists of the names of the parties, the amount of the mahr, a cleric's signature, the signature of two male witnesses, and a disclaimer that Islamic law will govern the marriage contract. In Islamic marriages, assets brought into the union by the wife may only be accepted by the husband after the mahr has been paid by him to her.

In the Arabian world, there are varying interpretations of mahr containing marriage contracts, highlighting the differences between Maliki, Hanbali, Hanafi, Shafi, and Jafari schools of Islamic jurisprudence. For example, the Hanafi School holds that if the woman initiates the divorce (khulʿ) she cannot receive her mahr regardless of whether the husband is or is not at fault, while the Maliki School holds that when the husband is at fault for the divorce, the wife does not forfeit her right to the mahr even if she initiates the divorce. The schools also differ over the requisite number of witnesses to the contract. The Hanafi School requires two witnesses on the document for a mahr containing contract to be valid, while the Maliki School holds that witnesses are only needed at marriage's publication but not the document.

== Differences and issues ==
Mahr is similar in legal enforceability to donatio propter nuptias of Eastern Roman law, except some critical differences. Donatio propter nuptias was optional and voluntary, while mahr is mandatory and required for all Muslim marriages. Mahr is not an optional gift. The other difference was that donatio propter nuptias was a security the groom delivered to bride or registered in her name, at the time of marriage, in exchange for dos (dowry) that came with the bride. Mahr is a religious requirement according to Sharia.

Under Islamic law, there is no concept of marital property. In Islam, marriage is a contract between a man and his wife. A Muslim man and woman do not merge their legal identity upon marriage. The assets of the man before the marriage, and earned after the marriage, remain his during marriage, and in case of a divorce.

A divorce under Islamic law does not require redistribution of property. Rather, each spouse walks away from the marriage with his or her individual property. Divorcing Muslim women who did not work outside their home after marriage, except for the deferred mahr, are left with little or no claim on the collective wealth of the couple. The deferred mahr is considered a debt owed by the man to the woman, and is owed even if he has no assets.

Divorce under Islamic law may take many forms. If a woman wishes to divorce her husband she has two options: seek a tafriq, or seek a khulʿ. A tafriq is a divorce for certain allowable reasons, such as abuse or abandonment. This divorce is granted by a qadi, a religious judge. If a tafriq is granted, the marriage is dissolved and the husband is obligated to pay the wife the deferred mahr specified in their marriage contract. The second method, khulʿ is a divorce without cause, by mutual consent. This divorce requires a husband's consent and it must be supported by consideration that passes from the wife to the husband. Often, this consideration consists of the wife relinquishing her claim to the deferred mahr. In contrast to allowable methods of divorce to a woman, a husband may unilaterally divorce his wife, as talaq, however, if he does it for no reason and no explanation, it is not allowed. However, upon talaq, the husband must pay the wife her deferred mahr.

Western courts have treated mahr provisions in a manner similar to pre-marital contracts. However, in many cases the courts have considered the validity of the marriage contract in cases such as where proper disclosures were not made at the time of marriage, the bride and groom did not separately consent without duress, and in case the bride or both spouses entered into a child marriage prior to legal age of consent.

== References in Islamic texts ==
The Encyclopaedia of Islam's entry on mahr states: "According to a tradition in Bukhari, the mahr is an essential condition for the legality of the marriage: 'Every marriage without mahr is null and void'."

According to Islamic teachings in the hadith (sayings of Muhammad), mahr is the amount to be paid by the groom to the bride at the time of marriage, some of which may be delayed according to what is agreed upon by the spouses. The mahr is for her to spend as she wishes. It can be cash, jewellery or any other valuable gift. In some cases, per Sahih al-Bukhari (Volume 7, Book 62, Number 72), even an iron ring can be mahr.

Sura 4.4, 4.19, 4.20, 4.24, 60.10 and 60.11 of Qur'an require a groom to give a dower to a bride.

=== Modern purposes ===
In 2003, Rubya Mehdi published an article in which the culture of mahr among Muslims was thoroughly reviewed.

Mahr is a means of sustenance in case of a sudden death, divorce or other emergency.

== See also ==
- Islamic marital jurisprudence
- Women and Islam
