= Hindu marriage laws in Pakistan =

Federal Law governing Hindu marriages in Pakistan

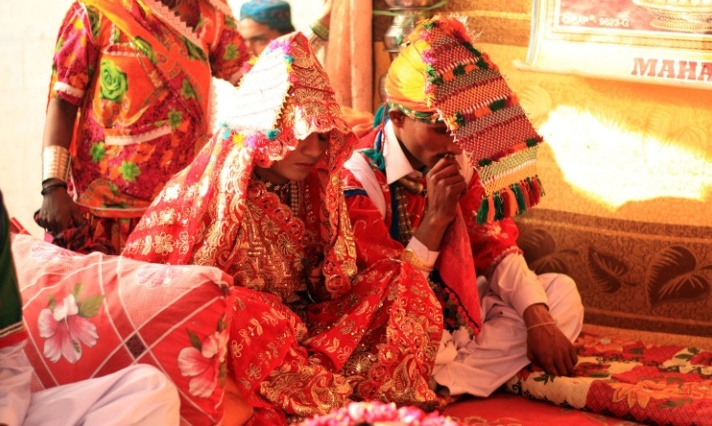
Hindu marriage in Pakistan

In Pakistan, there are two laws governing Hindu marriages. One is the Sindh Hindu Marriage Act of 2016 which is applicable in the Sindh province of Pakistan and another is the Hindu Marriage Act of 2017 which is applicable in Islamabad Capital Territory, Balochistan, Khyber-Pakhtunkhwa and Punjab provinces. However, there are no laws and amendments made to register a marriage between two Hindus- one from Sindh and another from a different Province (Islamabad Capital Territory, Balochistan, Khyber-Pakhtunkhwa and Punjab).

== Sindh Hindu Marriage Act of 2016 ==
It is the first Hindu Marriage Act in Pakistan. It is applicable for Hindus living in the Sindh province. The Sikhs and Zorastrians can also register their marriage under this act.

The Hindu Marriage Bill 2016 was moved by Sindh Parliamentary Affairs Minister Nisar Ahmed Khuhro. In February 2016, the Provincial Assembly of Sindh passed the bill. As per this act any Hindu male and female above 18 can register their marriage.

In 2018, the act was amended to add divorce and remarriage rights for couples and financial security of the wife and children after divorce. The amendment was proposed by Pakistan Muslim League-Functional (PML-F) assembly member Nand Kumar Goklani.

In 2018, the first inter-caste Hindu marriage was registered under the Sindh Hindu Marriage Act in Mirpurkhas District.

== Hindu Marriage Act of 2017 ==
It is the first federal level personal law for Hindus. It is applicable to the Hindus living in Islamabad Capital Territory, Balochistan, Khyber-Pakhtunkhwa and Punjab provinces. The Hindu Marriage Bill was moved by Human Rights Minister Kamran Michael in 2016. It was unanimously passed by the National Assembly of Pakistan in 2016. In 2017, the Senate of Pakistan passed the bill. In March 2017, the Pakistani President Mamnoon Hussain signed the Hindu Marriage Bill and thereby making it a law. The bill paves the way for regulations on registration of marriages and divorce for Hindus and fixes the minimum marrying age for males and females at 18 years-old.

=== Islamabad Capital Territory ===
The law was notified in 2023 through the Islamabad Capital Territory Hindu Marriage Rules 2023. As per that, the Union Councils will provide Shaadi Pert (marriage certificate) to couples, and the wedding will be solemnised by a Pundit or Maharaj. The requirement for being a Pundit is

- He has to be a Hindu male with necessary knowledge in Hinduism.
- Character certificate from local police
- Approval from at least 10 Hindus.

The rule also mandates that the Pundit should not take any money for solemnsing marriages except for the fees mandated by the government. The rule also states that the termination of marriages and remarriages will be governed by the West Pakistan Family Courts Act 1964.

=== In other Provinces ===
The bill was notified in Punjab in 2025. In 2026, Khyber Pakhtunkhwa passed the Hindu Marriage (Amendment) Act 2026 which amended to appoint district level marriage registrars from the Hindu community to facilitate marriage.

== See also ==
- Hinduism in Pakistan
- Divorce in Pakistan
- Women related laws in Pakistan
- Forced conversion of minority girls in Pakistan
