= Khul' =

Islamic divorce procedure

Khulʿ (Arabic: خلع [xʊlʕ]), also called khula, is a procedure based on traditional jurisprudence, that allows a Muslim woman to initiate a divorce by returning the mahr and everything she received from him during their life together, or without returning anything, as agreed by the spouses or judge's decree, depending on the circumstances.

== Origins in texts ==
=== Qur'an ===
From the "Sahih International" translation of the Qur'an.

Divorce is twice. Then, either keep [her] in an acceptable manner or release [her] with good treatment. And it is not lawful for you to take anything of what you have given them unless both fear that they will not be able to keep [within] the limits of Allah. But if you fear that they will not keep [within] the limits of Allah, then there is no blame upon either of them concerning that by which she ransoms herself. These are the limits of Allah, so do not transgress them. And whoever transgresses the limits of Allah—it is those who are the wrongdoers.

— 2:229

And if a woman fears from her husband contempt or evasion, there is no sin upon them if they make terms of settlement between them—and settlement is best. And present in [human] souls is stinginess. But if you do good and fear Allah—then indeed Allah is ever Acquainted, with what you do.

— 4:128

=== Hadith ===
The most well known story that references khul' and serves as the basis for legal interpretations is the story of Jamilah, the wife of Thabit ibn Qays:

Narrated Ibn 'Abbas: The wife of Thabit bin Qais came to the Prophet and said, "O Allah's Apostle! I do not blame Thabit for defects in his character or his religion, but I, being a Muslim, dislike to behave in un-Islamic manner if I remain with him." On that Allah's Apostle said to her, "Will you give back the garden which your husband has given you as Mahr?" She said, "Yes." Then the Prophet ordered to Thabit, "O Thabit! Accept your garden, and divorce her once."

== Related issues ==
=== Compensation ===
Most Islamic schools of law agree that the husband is not entitled to more than the initial amount of dower (mahr) given to the wife. However, some interpretations suggest that the husband is entitled a greater compensation, while other interpretations suggest that the husband is not entitled to any compensation. According to some interpretations, khulʿ demands that the mahr already paid be returned along with any wedding gifts. According to majority of imams of fiqh this law only to apply if there is no fault on the husband. Men sometimes prefer and pressure their wives to demand a khulʿ instead of the husband pronouncing a talaq so that the husband can demand the return of the mahr. Another scenario that rarely arises in khulʿ is that the husband will request an unreasonable financial compensation. This can effectively constrain her from seeking khulʿ because they have no means to support themselves financially with the loss of their mahr and other wedding “gifts.”

=== Consent of the husband ===
Most schools agree that husband's agreement is essential to the granting of divorce, unless there are extenuating circumstances. Only few schools allow a judge to give a no fault divorce without the husband's consent. The husband does not have to consent if there are valid grounds for divorce, such as cruelty or impotence undisclosed at time of marriage. In addition, if a husband cannot provide his wife with basic marital obligations, such as shelter or maintenance, a woman may be granted khulʿ. If the woman is underage, then consent must be given by the guardian of her property. The details of laws of khulʿ in particular cannot be found in the Qur'an directly, so a Sharia court judge must refer to Hadith and precedent in deciding what are valid reasons for divorce.

=== Role of the Court ===
Views on role of the court and judge varies across schools, depending on whether or not the divorce is considered a type of talaq (husband's repudiation of the marriage) or judicial annulment. If the husband does not consent to the divorce, a woman often goes to a mediating third party, such as an imam. Only a person versed in Islamic law i.e. a qadi, or Islamic Sharia court judge, can grant the khulʿ without the husband's consent. When petition for khulʿ is taken to the Sharia courts, a judge is permitted to substitute the husband and annul the marriage. This process of judicial annulment is also commonly referred to as faskh, which typically occurs when the husband refuses to consent to the wife's decision to divorce.

=== Iddah ===
When a woman is granted a divorce through khulʿ, she must enter a waiting period known as iddah. According to the majority opinion, which includes the reliable position in the Hanafi, Maliki, Shafi'i and Hanbali schools, the waiting period for khul' is the same as the waiting period for talaq, and a minority opinion limits it to a single period. If a woman has already gone through menopause, she must wait three calendar months. The waiting period for a woman who has irregular periods is dependent on different interpretations. If a woman is pregnant, she must observe the waiting period until she gives birth.

=== Custody ===
Custody of children tends to be given to their mother if she has not remarried, but the father is still obligated to provide support. Once a child is old enough (seven for boys, nine for girls), he or she is given the choice of which parent to live with according to Shafii, or custody is given to the father according to the Hanbali school, or custody is given to mother according to Maliki school.

== Interpretations by region ==
=== Egypt ===
A form of khulʿ was adopted by Egypt in 2000, allowing a Muslim woman to divorce her husband without any fault. The law is so strict that only 126 women out of 5,000 women who applied for khul were actually granted. As a condition of the divorce, the woman renounces any financial claim on the husband and any entitlement to the matrimonial home. The Islamic khulʿ procedure has also been used by some Egyptian Christian women to obtain a no-fault divorce, and it is considered by some as an opportunity for their empowerment vis-à-vis patriarchical institutions.

=== India ===
Indian Jurisprudence allows for the following the personal law of Muslims in a marriage based on the Muslim Personal Law (Shariat) Application Act. However, there has been several judicial interpretations that have overruled Muslim divorce practices. A Kerala High Court judgement of 2022 had ruled that the consent of the Husband is not needed for the Khul' procedure, essentially turning it into a unilateral process.

=== Iraq ===
Iraq is unique in that it is stated in the law that infidelity constitutes as a valid reason for divorce. In addition, a woman is allowed to seek khul' if her husband is infertile and they do not have children. When a woman is granted khulʿ, compensation can be greater or less than the dower(if husband is not at fault).

=== Jordan, Morocco, and Syria ===
In Morocco, if a woman is coerced or harassed by her husband, he is not entitled to compensation. In Morocco and Syria, compensation other than money can include child care or custody. In Jordan, courts saw an exponential increase in khulʿ cases after a law change that allowed a woman to end her marriage by returning her mahr and without proving fault.

=== Nigeria ===
Khulʿ is the most common form of divorce in Northern Nigeria. If a woman can provide enough compensation on her own or with the help of family, it is likely that she will be able to get out of an unhappy marriage.

=== North America ===
According to a ten-year study from 1992 to 2002 conducted by Dr Ilyas Ba-Yunus, the overall divorce rate amongst the Muslim population in North America was at 32% which was significantly lower than the 51% rate for the general population. Further, In North America, a 2009 a study conducted for SoundVision, an Islamic foundation, concluded that 64% of Islamic divorces are initiated by women. Imams in North America have adopted multiple approaches towards Khulʿ. One of the biggest issues that cause imams to differ in their views is whether or not the women should return the mahr to the husband. Another important issue for women in North America is getting both a civil decree and religious divorce. Religious divorce is sought out as "a meaningful personal and spiritual process" that is attained in addition to (not as a substitute) to a civil decree. Another important issue that arises in North America is that many women are unaware of their Islamic right to seek khulʿ. Some North American women even caution that being assertive and knowledgeable of Islamic law in front of their imam may even be detrimental to them. Women have said that the imams appeared to be "less sympathetic" because they saw the women as challengers to their authority.

=== Pakistan ===
The Dissolution of Muslim Marriage Act allowed judicial khula without the husband's consent and was later extended to include no fault divorce if the wife agrees to forfeit her financial rights.

=== Yemen ===
Alcoholism, jail time of more than three years, impotence, mental feebleness, and hatred are grounds for khulʿ. While domestic violence is considered a sufficient reason for divorce, it is against the law in Yemen for husbands to physically or psychologically harm their wives.
