= Aisha Gazdar =

Pakistani journalist

- Occupations: Filmmaker, journalist, scriptwriter, documentary researcher
- Notable work: The Honor Deception
- Parent(s): Mushtaq Gazdar (father), Saeeda Gazdar (mother)

Aisha Gazdar is a Pakistani journalist, writer, filmmaker and a researcher for documentaries. She is known for her award-winning film: The Honor Deception. She is the daughter of Mushtaq Gazdar.

== Personal life ==
Aisha's father was a cinematographer Mushtaq Gazdar. Her mother, Saeeda Gazdar was a poet and writer. Aisha has one brother. Aisha started her journey in the film industry after her father died in 2000.

== Education ==
Aisha holds a Masters in Human Rights and International Relations.

== Career ==
Aisha began her career in the media as a child. She used to appear in advertisements and documentaries directed by her father Mushtaq Gazdar. She then started work as her father's assistant where she worked on voice overs, script writing and researcher for documentaries

Aisha entered the film industry after her father's death. She started working on her father's documentary atom bomb in 2001. Since then, Aisha has worked on many documentaries and films that highlight social issues of Pakistan.

Aisha has worked on her father's docudrama, Roz-e-Qaza, (2004) based on atom bombs. The film was screened on Television and the Kara Film Festival.

Aisha travelled to India, Sri Lanka and Bangladesh for her long documentary, Another world is Possible: CEDAW in South Asia, which is based on women's rights in South Asia. She has also made films for First Women's Bank and OMV. She has also produced a song for the Shaheed Zulfiqar Ali Bhutto Institute of Technology and Sciences Archives which was screened at Zulfiqar Ali Bhutto's death anniversary in Larkana.

Ayesha's documentary, The Silent Voices won the best film award in the Canadian Labour International Film Festival.

In 2013, Aisha won an award at the Delhi film festival for her film, The Honour Deception, which is based on the honor killings in Pakistan. The Honor Deception is 16 minutes documentary that has been made in collaboration with Action Aid Pakistan.

Aisha has also been associated with Films 'D art, her father's production house.

Aisha is also a part of Shirkat Gah, an organization for women rights, where she advocates women rights and researches in the field of women development.

== Filmography ==
- Roz-e-Qaza
- Another World is Possible: CEDAW in South Asia
- Silent Voices: Home-based Women Workers in Pakistan.
- The Honor Deception
