= Punjab Commission on the Status of Women =

Department of the Government of Punjab, Pakistan

- Abbreviation: PCSW
- Formation: March 2014
- Legal status: Statutory body of the Government of the Punjab
- Purpose: Achieve gender equality Women's Empowerment; Elimination of Violence against Women
- Location: Lahore, Pakistan
- Board of directors: Position vacant
- Website: https://pcsw.punjab.gov.pk/

The Punjab Commission on Status of Women (PCSW) is a human rights institution in Pakistan, which was established by the Government of Punjab in March 2014 under the PCSW Act, 2014. Its mandate is to work for the empowerment of women, expansion of opportunities for socio-economic development of women, and elimination of all forms of discrimination against women.

== Introduction ==
PCSW engages in research, advocacy, redressal, accountability, rehabilitation, awareness, capacity building, and monitoring to achieve the objectives of women's empowerment and preventing gender based violence. It mainly works and lobbies with lawmakers, parliamentarians and other decision-makers for promotion of laws and regulations aimed at empowering women in the social, economic and political spheres. PCSW has the unique powers to seek and receive information, data or documents from any public body, and it holds the powers of a civil court to ensure the attendance of any person and production of documents.

Since 2014, the commission not only built and maintained relationships with non-government organisations (NGOs) and other experts in order to effectively protect women's rights, but also undertook different initiatives to contribute to its objectives which include; developing IEC material, organizing awareness and capacity building sessions, conducting research studies as well as setting up centres to empower women economically, and provide protection to women victims of violence. In this regard, an employment facilitation centre was set up that helped to train women job-seekers in job search, CV writing, and protection against harassment at workplace.

PCSW has produced Gender Parity Reports and a Survey report on Economic and Social Wellbeing of Women. It has also developed a Gender Management Information System (GMIS) that helped address gender disparity in the public sector, track implementations of governmental pro-women initiatives, and monitor the status of women in Punjab. PCSW produced research based on the assessment of women in shelter homes and prisons. The members of the PCSW monitored the local government elections, and reported several issues relating to women to the authorities at the election commission of Pakistan. PCSW has set up a helpline where cases regarding authorities' lack of cooperation can be reported.

== Mandate and functions of PCSW ==
PCSW has a broad mandate to promote and protect women's rights in Punjab province.

- Examining of the policies, programs, and other measures taken by the Government of Punjab, and monitor their implementation for achievement of gender equality.
- Reviewing all laws, policies, rules, and regulations that affect the status and rights of women.
- Undertake research and collect data to generate information, analysis, and studies and maintain a database relating to women and gender issues, for policy and strategic action.
- Monitor violation of women's rights and provide redressal.
- Monitor mechanisms and institutional procedures by inspecting jails, shelter homes / Darul Amans and crisis centres, etc. and intervene for the redress of violations of women's rights and grievances.
- Monitoring the implementation of human rights instruments such as; treaties and declaration, to which Pakistan is a party, and facilitate government in drafting compliance reports under international obligations.

== Establishment of PCSW ==
The Commission comprises a chairperson and ten independent members, preferably women, one from each division of Punjab, and one woman member from the religious minority communities. Whereas the secretaries to different government departments, the president women Chamber of Commerce and Industries serve as ex-officio members. According to PCSW, 2014, the persons must have prior experience of working on women's rights to be eligible for PCSW's membership. The members, between thirty and sixty years of age, are appointed to serve for a period of three years from the date of their appointment.

=== Chairperson ===
- Fauzia Viqar: 2014-2017, 2017-2019

=== Former Members ===
2015 - 2018
No	Name	Representation of Divisions
1.	Ume Laila Azhar	Lahore Division
2.	Shazia George	Faisalabad Division
3.	Samina Nazir	Rawalpindi Division
4.	Zia ur Rehman	Multan Division
5.	Dr. Nagina Sadaf	Gujranwala Division
6.	Prof. M. Jalil Butt	Sahiwal Division
7.	Qaisra Ismail	Sargodha Division
8.	Prof. Dr. Razia Musarrat	Bahawalpur Division
9.	Ume Kalsoom Seyal	Dera Ghazi Khan Division
10.	Romana Bashir	Minority Member

== PCSW's key Initiatives ==
PCSW has taken some initiatives which were never done before in Pakistan's history.

=== Punjab Gender Parity Report ===
PCSW provides analysis and insight into gender disparity existing in government institutions with the help of data collected from provincial departments and district offices. It published Gender Parity Reports for 2016, 2017, 2018, 2019&2020 and 2021 disseminated among policy-makers, NGOs, academics, foreign missions, etc. The Punjab Gender Parity Reports are launched on annual basis.

=== Gender Management Information System (GMIS) ===
PCSW in collaboration with the Urban Unit developed a web-based Gender Management Information System (GMIS) on the status of women in Punjab province, which is an online database of sex-disaggregated data on 274 indicators across six thematic areas, including, Demographics, Governance, Health, Education, Justice, Economic Participation & Opportunities. GMIS provides the implementation status of implementation of Punjab Women Empowerment Packages, and the special initiatives taken by the government of the Punjab.

=== Women in Leadership ===
This PCSW's initiative was taken to facilitate the implementation of Punjab Women Empowerment Package (PWEM) 2012 and Punjab Fair Representation of Women Act, 2014. In this regard, correspondence and networking with over 130 public sector entities and government departments were made that helped to increase women's representation in decision-making positions in the public sector by identifying potential women candidates and recommending them to government departments for placement on Boards & in Committees. Till 2018, 37 public sector entities were fulfilling the 33% requirement set by PWEP 2012.

=== Transitional Housing for Women Victims of Violence ===
PCSW in collaboration with the Social Welfare and Baitul Maal Department (SWD) signed an MoU to provide a transitional housing facility to the victims of domestic violence. A model transitional home was launched for female survivors of violence on 26 May 2017, which is equipped with facilities such as; bedrooms, a children's classroom, a resident classroom, Computer Lab, and a dispensary. It provides vocational training for a period of 6–12 months with the support of different Institutes such as; Punjab Vocational Training Council (PVTC), Pakistan Readymade Garments Technical Training Institute (PRGTTI), and National Vocational and Technical Training Commission (NAVTCC). It also provides training on different topics like pro-women laws, entrepreneurship, mental health, and confidence-building, and organizes individual psycho-social and group therapy sessions.

=== Legislation and Litigation ===
- PCSW reviewed different existing laws and provided assistance in drafting new pro-women bills, and its Chairperson participated in different panel discussion. PCSW Chairperson supported the bill Domestic Violence Bill that provides for effective protection system including establishing centres and shelters in all districts for women survivors of domestic, emotional, psychological and verbal, economic abuse, stalking and cybercrime.
- PCSW's Chairperson welcomed the court ruling in a polygamy case where a man was sentenced to imprisonment for marrying a second woman without his wife's consent, and hoped that the judgement would set a precedent to discourage polygamy and encourage women to take up their case with the courts.
- PCSW engaged in litigation regarding cases of women's rights. For instance, Chairperson Fauzia Viqar became a party, and submitted a statement before the Lahore High Court that it should uphold its earlier decision relating to restoring section 7 of the Christian Divorce Act 1869, which enabled Christian men to divorce their spouses without using the charge of adultery. This section was repealed by the President Gender Zia-ul-Haq through issuing an ordinance in 1981 that left no ground for Christian men to divorce their wives except leveling charge of adultery against them.

=== Awareness and Capacity Building ===
- As Chairperson, Fauzia Viqar signed a memorandum of understanding (MoU) with several universities such as; Punjab University and Lahore College for Women University that agreed to unite their resources and expertise to increase awareness of women's rights and engage students in research efforts about women related issues.
- Along with its members, PCSW launched a campaign on 16 Days of Activism against Gender-based Violence, and organized and participated in different activities involving radio programs, awareness sessions, rallies, seminars, and press conference, etc. in different districts of Punjab Province.
- It organized training workshops on State Accountability, Due Diligence and Role of Civil Society in Eliminating Violence against Women that helped enhance understanding of the international legal principle of state accountability to exercise due diligence through the Prevention, Protection, Prosecution, Punishment and Provide Redress. This training was joined by the officials and representatives of the different government departments including; Women Development Department, Social Welfare & Bait ul Maal, Population Welfare Department, Health Department, Prosecution Department, Punjab Women Parliamentary Caucus, National Commission for Human Rights, Punjab Forensic Science Agency and Office of the Ombudsperson participated the event.
- Training was provided to thousands of Nikah Registrars and Local Government & Community Development Officials serving in different divisions of Punjab. They were given orientation about fundamental human rights, registration of marriage, Child Marriage Restraint Act, and family law. The training helped them to fill the nikahnama (marriage contract) correctly without compromising on women's rights, and to effectively follow the various procedures involved in marriage registration.
- Gender sensitivity training for the serving District & Sessions Judges at the Punjab Judicial Academy were organised.
- PCSW established a network of young women leaders, and organized training to build capacity of students who further engaged in awareness raising in their communities.

=== Initiatives to deal with Harassment ===
- PCSW, in collaboration with Aurat Foundation, Women's Development Department of Punjab and the UN Women, the Chief Minister's Strategic Reform Unit and the Punjab Safe Cities Authority carried out a study and launched a report titled 'Women's Safety Audit in Public Transport'. The report reveals that bus stations and buses are not women-friendly in Lahore, as they have to face staring, stalking, obscene gestures, whistling, lewd remarks and touching while commuting in public transport. The data highlight that about 82 per cent of women commuters report harassment at bus stops, with higher rates at LTC bus stops compared to metro bus stations, and amongst younger women (20–29 years of age) compared to older women.
- PCSW and the Federal Investigation Agency (FIA) signed an MOU that helped address the complaints relating to harassment of women in the cyber space.
- A smartphone application was launched to enable women report incidents of harassment with a click of a button to police where emergency response team is engaged to track their location via a built-in global positioning system (GPS). This is a step forward to ensuring women's safety.

=== Punjab Women's Helpline (1043) ===
A toll-free 24/7 helpline was launched in August 2014, where the following services are provided:

- Provides advice, guidance, and information about women related laws, policies, and services;
- Refers aggrieved or victimized women to sources of legal aid/representation;
- Receives and registers complaints in cases of institutional challenges faced by women, or a lack of response/action by government functionaries in Punjab.

== Publications ==
A number of research reports and awareness material have been published by PCSW.

1. Gender Management Information System
2. Punjab Gender Parity Report 2016
3. Punjab Gender Parity Report 2018
4. Punjab Gender Parity Report 2019 & 2020
5. Punjab Gender Parity Report 2021
6. Survey indicators Economic & Social Wellbeing of Women
7. Key Findings Reports Economic & Social Wellbeing of Women
8. Gathering data to advance women's Social & Economic Wellbeing 2017-2018 (survey Results)
9. Policy brief on Empowerment of Young Women
10. Policy brief on Overcoming Barriers to Women's Mobility
11. Policy brief on Gender Based Violence
12. Policy brief on Financial Inclusion of Women
13. Sheltering Women from Harm: Dar-ul-Amans of Punjab (2016)
14. Evaluating 2015 Legal Reforms Related to Land Inheritance and Their Impact on Women
15. Punjab Local Government Election Monitoring Report 2015
16. Women in Punjab Prisons - Desk Review
17. Inspection Report for Central Jail Gujranwala
18. Punjab Women's Helpline
19. Female Help Desks in Punjab Police Stations - Status Report
20. Employment facilitation Centre
21. Women Innovation Network
22. Annual Reports: 2016, 2017, 2021 & 2022

== Current status and controversy ==
Punjab Commission is dormant for over a year for the delay in the appointment of the Chairperson and the Members.

Fauzia Viqar has served as PCSW's Chairperson for two consecutive terms since 2014, however, she was arbitrarily terminated prematurely with a month's notice through a notification issued by Women's Development Department (WDD) on 21 May 2019 without mentioning any reason, which is in violation to procedures given in the PCSW Act 2014. The political and rights based groups criticized the government's decision to remove the Chairperson in such a manner, because she was terminated at a time when she was on Ex Pakistan leaves.

According to the law, the government is bound to appoint PCSW's members within thirty days of occurrence of a vacancy. However, the members have not been appointed since the expiration of their term in March 2018.

== See also ==
- Women related laws in Pakistan
