= Merv Griffin =

American talk show host (1925–2007)

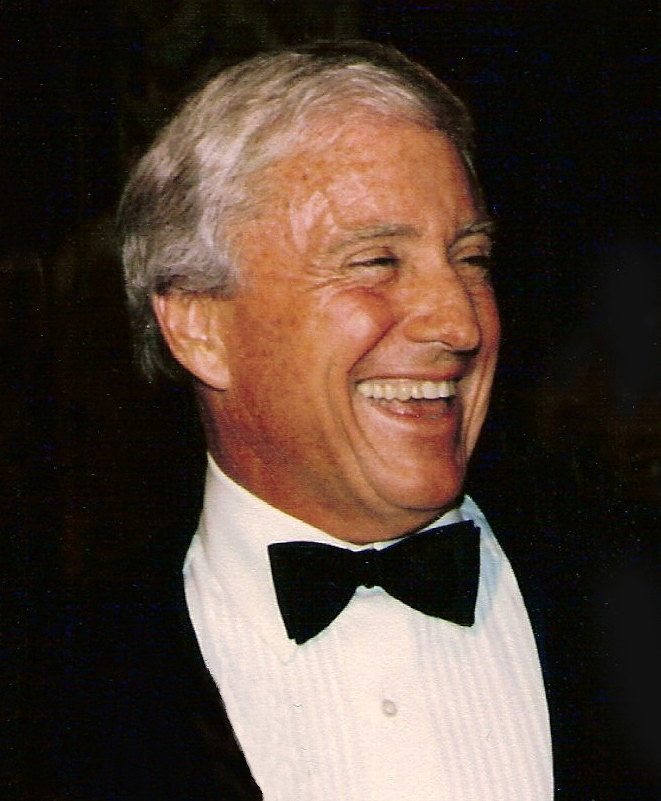
- Griffin in 1994
- Born: Mervyn Edward Griffin Jr. July 6, 1925; San Mateo, California, U.S.
- Died: August 12, 2007 (aged 82); Los Angeles, California, U.S.
- Resting place: Westwood Village Memorial Park
- Occupations: Television show host; media mogul
- Years active: 1944–2007
- Political party: Republican
- Spouse: Julann Wright (m. 1958; div. 1976)
- Children: 1

Mervyn Edward Griffin Jr. (July 6, 1925 – August 12, 2007) was an American television show host and media mogul. He began his career as a radio and big band singer, later appearing in film and on Broadway. From 1962 to 1986, Griffin hosted his own talk show, The Merv Griffin Show. Griffin also created several game shows, including Jeopardy! and Wheel of Fortune, through his production companies, Merv Griffin Enterprises and Merv Griffin Entertainment.

== Early life ==
Griffin was born July 6, 1925, in San Mateo, California, to Mervyn Edward Griffin Sr., a stockbroker, and Rita Elizabeth Griffin (née Robinson), a homemaker. He had an older sister named Barbara. As a child, Griffin played hangman with his sister during family road trips. These games later inspired him to create the game show Wheel of Fortune. The family was Irish-American and Roman Catholic. Griffin began singing in his church choir as a child. By his teenage years, he was earning money as a church organist. His abilities as a pianist played a part in his early entry into show business.

Griffin graduated from San Mateo High School in 1942 and later contributed financially to the school. He attended San Mateo Junior College and then the University of San Francisco. Griffin was a member of the Tau Kappa Epsilon fraternity.

During World War II, Griffin was classified as 4F and exempt from military service after failing several physical examinations due to a minor heart murmur. During the Korean War, he was reexamined and found fit for service; however, he was exempt from the draft as he was over the age of 26.

== Career ==
=== Singing ===
Griffin started as a singer on radio at age 19, appearing on San Francisco Sketchbook, a nationally syndicated program based at KFRC. He was overweight as an adolescent and a young man, which led to some disappointment among fans who met him in person. In his autobiography, Griffin later revealed efforts to keep his appearance hidden from the public. Determined to change his appearance, he lost 80 pounds in four months.

Freddy Martin heard Griffin on the radio and invited him to tour with his orchestra, which he did for four years. By 1945, Griffin was able to form his own record label, Panda Records, which produced Songs by Merv Griffin, the first U.S. album recorded on magnetic tape. In 1947, Griffin had a 15-minute weekday singing program on KFRC.

Griffin gained widespread popularity through his radio performances and nightclub appearances. In 1949, his recording of "I've Got a Lovely Bunch of Coconuts" performed with Freddy Martin and his Orchestra, sold three million copies.

During a nightclub performance, Griffin was discovered by Doris Day, who arranged a screen test at Warner Bros. for a role in By the Light of the Silvery Moon (1953). Griffin did not get the part, but was subsequently cast in supporting roles in other musical films, including So This Is Love (1953). The film featured a scene with an open-mouthed kiss between Griffin and Kathryn Grayson, which attracted attention for being the first such kiss in a Hollywood film since the implementation of the Hays Code in 1934. Griffin also played minor roles in The Beast from 20,000 Fathoms (1953), The Boy from Oklahoma (1954), and Phantom of the Rue Morgue (1954). Dissatisfied with the film industry, Griffin bought out his Warner Bros. contract and shifted his focus to television.

In 1954, Griffin appeared in Cinécraft Productions sponsored films, including a musical, Milestones of Motoring, with Joe E. Brown. While moving to New York City that summer, Griffin and Betty Ann Grove co-hosted Summer Holiday on CBS. The show featured live music with the hosts while simulating a trip to various places in the world.

Griffin initially stayed with Loring Buzzell upon arriving in New York and became friends with him and his fiancée, Lu Ann Simms. Griffin later claimed in interviews that he was best man at their wedding in July 1954, but was in fact one of four ushers. When Buzzell and Simms had their first child, Cynthia Leigh Buzzell, on September 11, 1955, Griffin was named her godfather. After Buzzell's death in 1959, Griffin remained close to Simms and often featured her as a guest on his talk show.

=== Game show host ===
From 1958 to 1962, Griffin hosted Play Your Hunch, a game show produced by Mark Goodson and Bill Todman. Griffin also hosted the primetime ABC game show Keep Talking. He also filled as a temporary host for Bill Cullen on The Price Is Right and Bud Collyer on To Tell the Truth.

In 1963, NBC offered Griffin the role of host for a new game show, Word for Word, which he also produced. He went on to produce additional game shows, including Let's Play Post Office for NBC in 1965, Reach for the Stars for NBC in 1967, and One in a Million for ABC in 1967.

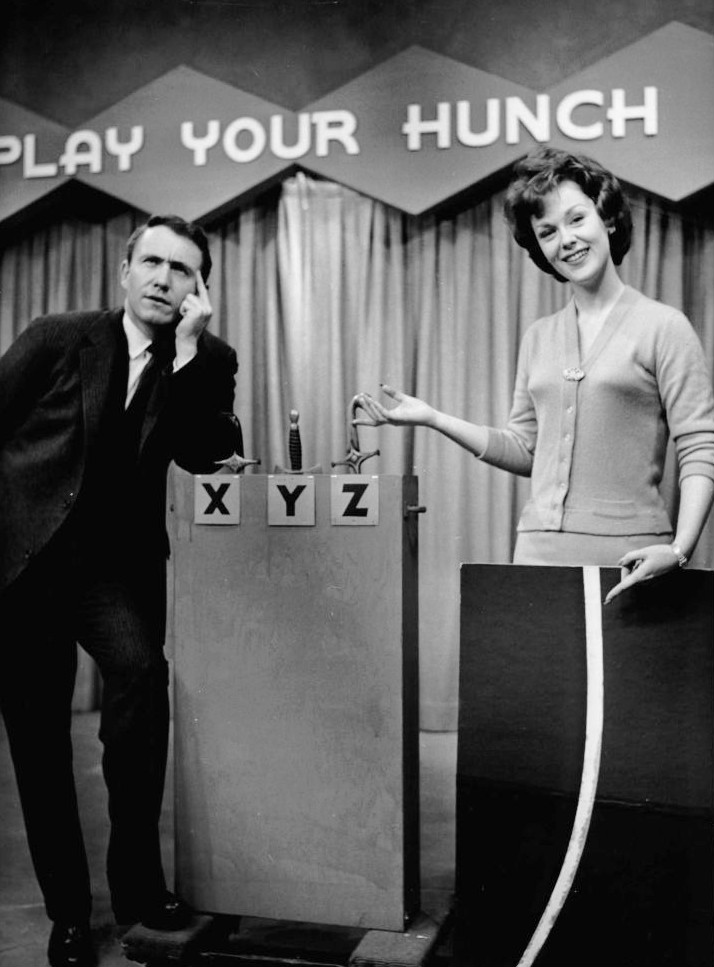
TV game show Play Your Hunch (1958) with host Griffin and Liz Gardner.

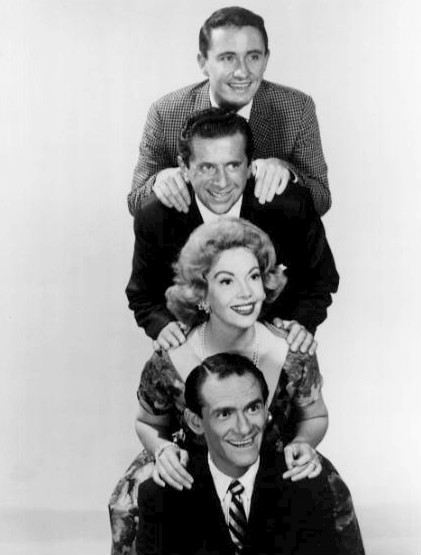
TV game show Keep Talking (1959) with host Griffin, Morey Amsterdam, Jayne Meadows and Danny Dayton.

=== Talk show host ===
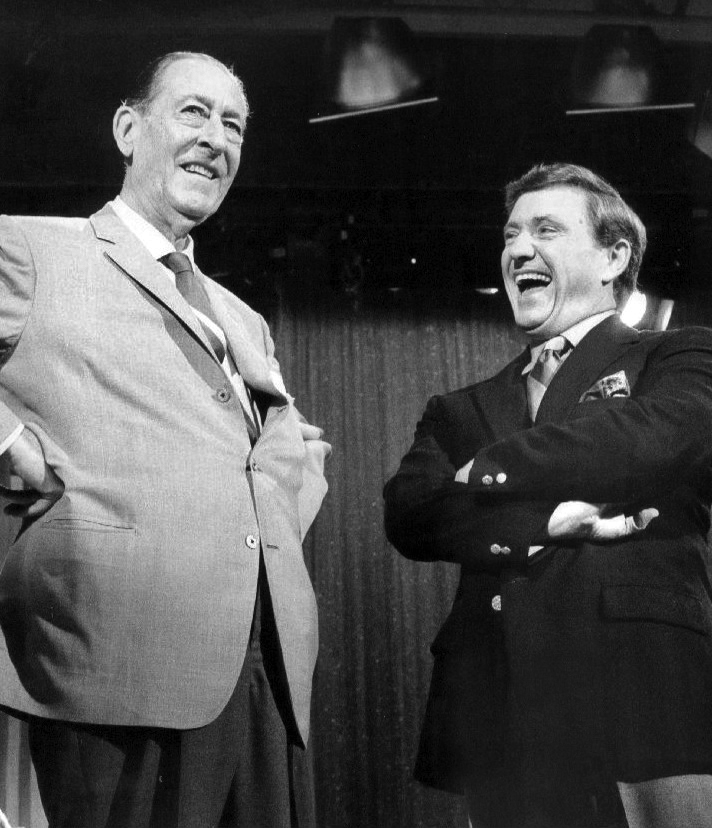
Griffin (right) and sidekick Arthur Treacher in 1969

Griffin gained attention when Tonight Show host Jack Paar accidentally walked onto the set of Play Your Hunch during a live broadcast. Griffin persuaded Paar to stay for a spontaneous interview. At the time, both shows shared Studio 6B at Rockefeller Center, with Play Your Hunch airing live in the morning and The Tonight Show taping later in the day. After Paar departed from The Tonight Show and before Johnny Carson assumed the role, Griffin served as one of several guest hosts during the interim period. He was regarded as the most successful of the guest hosts and, as a result, was given his own daytime talk show on NBC in 1962. The live 55-minute program was not successful and was canceled in 1963.

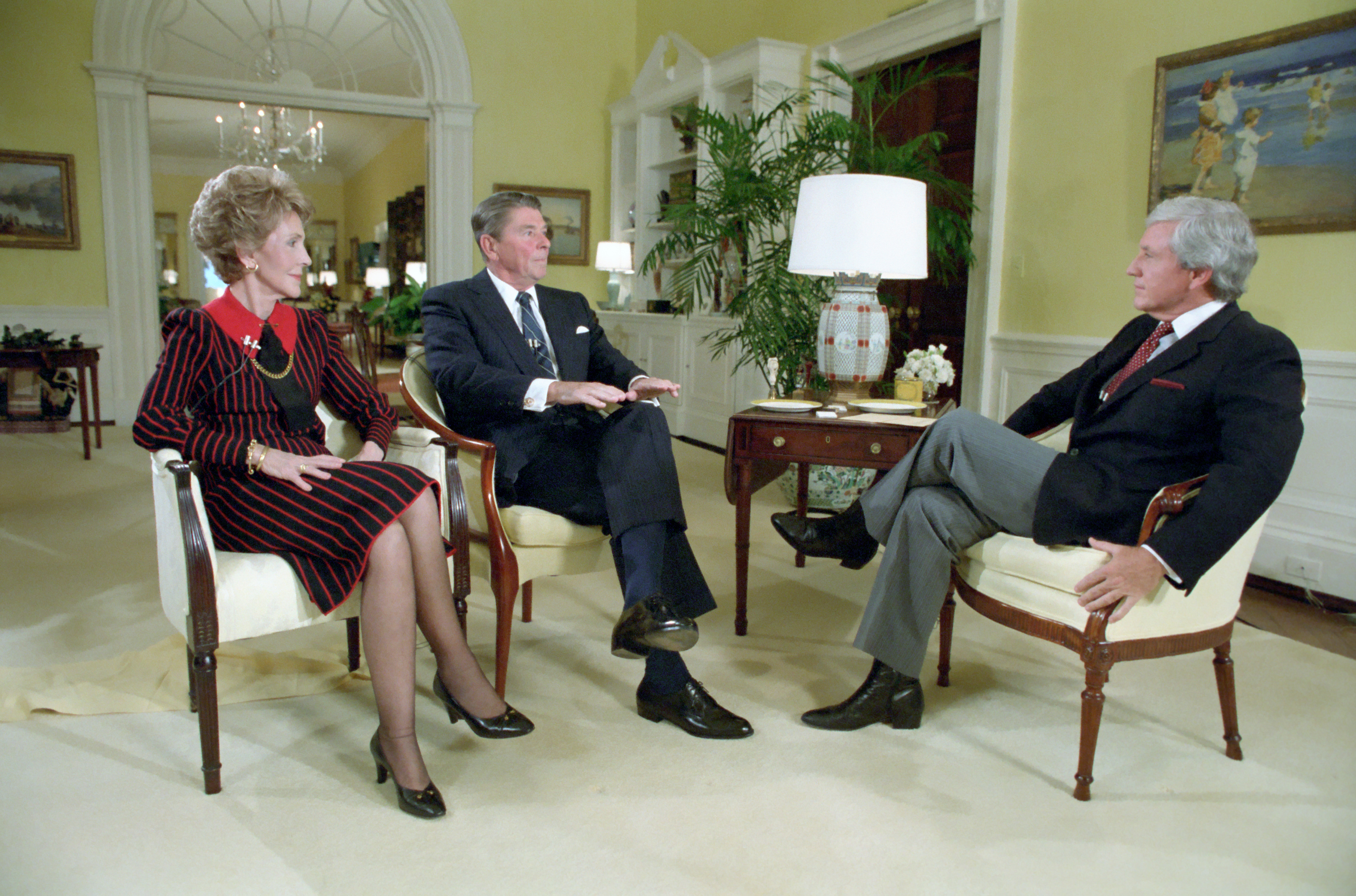
Griffin interviewing President Ronald Reagan and First Lady Nancy Reagan in 1983

In 1965, Griffin launched a syndicated talk show titled The Merv Griffin Show through Westinghouse Broadcasting. The program aired in various time slots across North America, with some stations broadcasting it during the daytime, others in primetime, and a few placing it opposite The Tonight Show. The CBS stations placing the show in the late night slot were not only competing with Johnny Carson and The Tonight Show on NBC but Joey Bishop and the Joey Bishop Show on ABC-TV as well.

Arthur Treacher, Griffin's mentor, served as the show's announcer and sidekick until 1970. After Treacher's departure, Griffin took over the announcing role, entering the stage with the phrase, "And now...here I come!" According to Griffin's obituary in Entertainment Weekly, The Merv Griffin Show won 11 Emmy Awards.

The show covered a range of topics, often addressing controversial issues such as the Vietnam War. Guests included a mix of entertainers, authors, politicians, and public figures like Zsa Zsa Gabor, as well as controversial figures including George Carlin, Dick Gregory, Richard Pryor, Norman Mailer, and Bertrand Russell. In 1974, Arnold Schwarzenegger made his American talk show debut on The Merv Griffin Show. In 1975 and 1977, Griffin dedicated two episodes to Transcendental Meditation and its founder Maharishi Mahesh Yogi. The 1977 episode was aired as a standalone special in some regions, including Canada. Griffin was an enthusiastic practitioner of meditation.

In 1969, Griffin moved from syndication to CBS, which launched a late-night talk show hosted by Griffin to compete with The Tonight Show. His three-year tenure at CBS was contentious, as the network frequently objected to his choice of guests, particularly those critical of the Vietnam War and other sensitive topics. In April 1970, when Abbie Hoffman appeared as a guest, CBS blurred the video of Hoffman to obscure his American flag-patterned shirt, despite the fact that other guests had worn similar attire uncensored. Griffin expressed frustration with CBS's censorship policies.

Frustrated with these restrictions and anticipating his departure from CBS, Griffin signed a deal with Metromedia for a syndicated daytime talk show to begin immediately if his CBS program was canceled. When CBS terminated his show in February 1972, Griffin's new program debuted the following month and ran until 1986. By then, profits from his successful game shows had made Griffin one of the wealthiest entertainers in the world.

A hallmark of the show was Griffin's interaction with audience members. One regular attendee, Lillian Miller, became a recurring presence on the program throughout its run.

Robert "Bob" Murphy, Griffin's best friend since sixth grade, was the producer of The Merv Griffin Show, and eventually became president of Merv Griffin Enterprises.

== Game show creator ==
Griffin created and produced the television game show Jeopardy!. In an Associated Press profile released prior to its debut, he explained the origins of the show:

My wife Julann just came up with the idea one day when we were in a plane bringing us back to New York from Duluth. I was mulling over game show ideas, when she noted that there had not been a successful 'question and answer' game on the air since the quiz show scandals. Why not do a switch, and give the answers to the contestant and let them come up with the question. She fired a couple of answers to me: '5,280' and the question of course was how many feet in a mile. Another was '79 Wistful Vista.' That was Fibber and Molly McGee's address. I loved the idea, went straight to NBC with the idea, and they bought it without even looking at a pilot show.

The show, originally titled What's the Question?, premiered on NBC in 1964, with Art Fleming as host, and ran for 11 years. Griffin composed the 30-second music piece for the "Final Jeopardy!" round, which later became the theme song for the syndicated version hosted by Alex Trebek starting in 1984.

After 11 years on the air, NBC canceled Jeopardy! while it still had a year remaining on its network contract. The final episode aired on January 3, 1975. Wheel of Fortune, another game show created by Griffin, premiered the following Monday. The show became a cultural phenomenon when its nighttime syndicated version debuted in 1983. Around this period, Griffin composed the show's theme song, "Changing Keys," which was used in various forms until 2000 and returned in 2021. In 1989, the daytime Wheel of Fortune moved to CBS and returned to NBC from January to September 1991.

Two revivals of Jeopardy! were produced: a five-month run on NBC in 1978 and 1979 with Art Fleming, and a syndicated version starting September 10, 1984, hosted by Alex Trebek. Both Jeopardy! and Wheel of Fortune continue to air in syndication today.

In 1990, Griffin attempted to adapt the board game Monopoly into a game show, which was cancelled after 12 episodes. His final game show, Ruckus, aired from the Resorts International Hotel & Casino, which Griffin owned, in Atlantic City, New Jersey. The show aired locally in the New York metropolitan area. After 60 episodes, a contract dispute led to its cancellation before syndication, scrapping plans for national syndication. Reruns later aired on Game Show Network.

On May 6, 1986, Griffin sold his production company, Merv Griffin Enterprises, to Columbia Pictures Television for $250 million. At the time, it was the largest sale of an entertainment company owned by a single individual. Forbes declared Griffin the wealthiest Hollywood performer in history. He retained the title of creator for his game shows.

The success of Jeopardy! and Wheel of Fortune inspired spin-offs, including Wheel 2000 (1997—1998), Jep! (1998), and Rock & Roll Jeopardy! (1998–2001). Grffin also created Click (1997–1999) and co-developed Headline Chasers (1985–1986) with Wink Martindale. From 2007 to 2008, Merv Griffin Entertainment produced the syndicated game show Merv Griffin's Crosswords.

On May 14, 2003, Griffin received the Broadcast Music, Inc. President's Award at the annual Film and Television Awards for his contributions to game show music.

== Business ventures ==
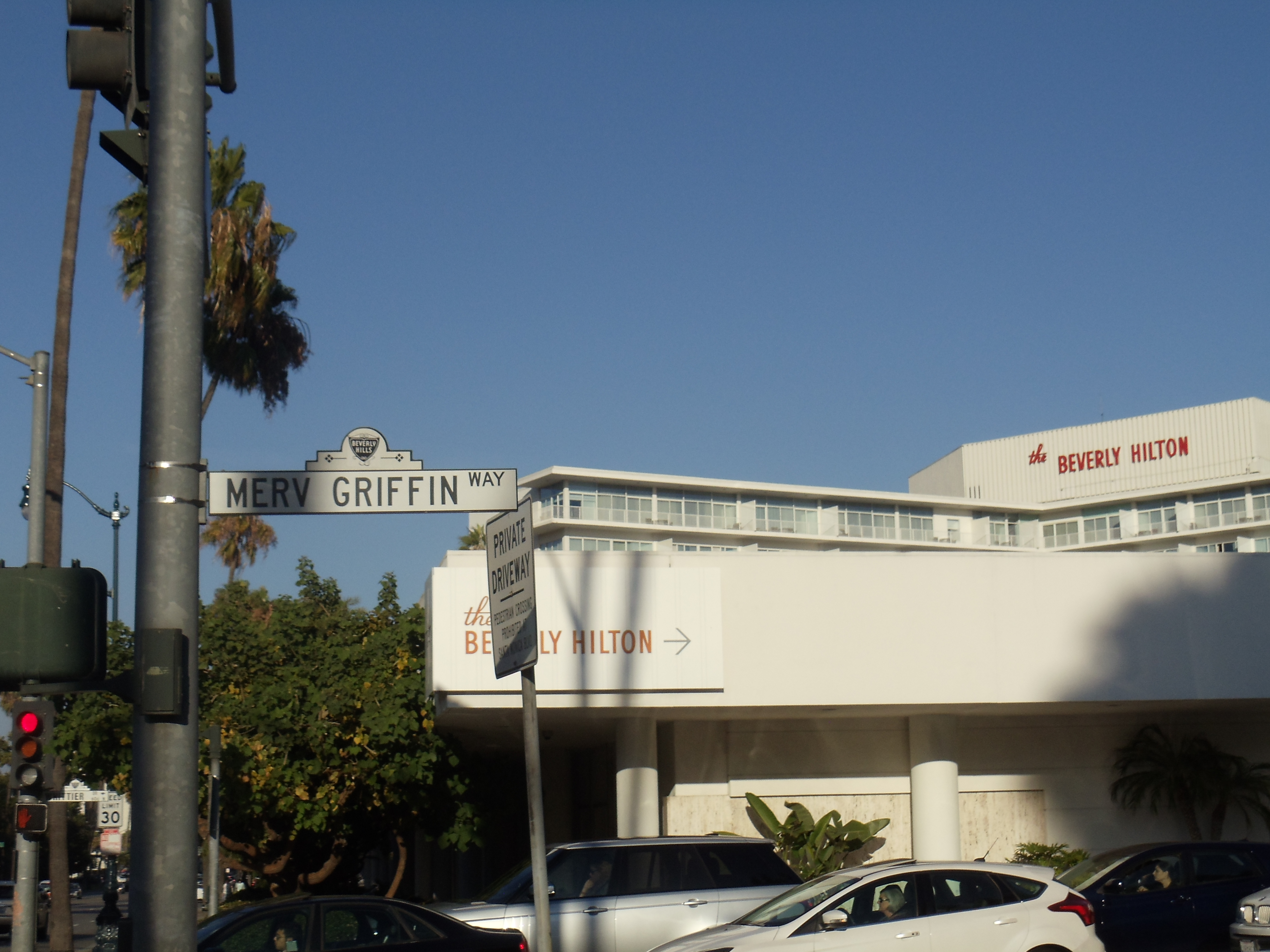
Merv Griffin Way with the Beverly Hilton in the background

Griffin expanded into real estate by purchasing The Beverly Hilton in 1987.

In 1988, Griffin purchased Resorts International and two of its properties: one in Atlantic City, New Jersey, and another on Paradise Island in The Bahamas, from Donald Trump and other investors. As part of the transaction, Trump purchased Resorts' interest in the under-construction Taj Mahal project for $273 million and retained ownership of Resorts International Air, which included three Sikorsky S-61 helicopters. (Note: Trump Air was established with these helicopters on March 22, 1988, with service between the Port Authority's West 30th Street pad in Manhattan and Bader Field and the Steeplechase Pier in Atlantic City. Fares were between $49 and $125 and the travel time was 48 minutes. One of the three Sikorsky S-61 helicopters had been operating already for about a month.) Earlier that year, Trump had sought to take Resorts private; instead Griffin, through his company Griffin Gaming & Entertainment, offered minority shareholders a more competitive bid in April 1988. After purchasing Resorts International for $101 million in 1987, Trump sold it to Griffin for $365 million with the assumed hotel-casino's debt of $925 million on November 15, 1988.

Within ten months, the company reported a loss of $46.6 million. Griffin had financed the acquisition with $325 million in junk bond financing at nearly 14% from Drexel Burnham Lambert's Michael Milken, and suspended interest payments in early 1989. By that year, the company's cash flow was about $70 million short of the amount needed to service its debt. On December 23, 1989, Griffin sought bankruptcy court protection for Resorts International.

The bankruptcy filing followed an involuntary petition by bondholders, who had previously reached a tentative agreement with Resorts. These bondholders sought protection of their legal claims against Trump, whom Griffin had outbid for Resorts in 1988. The bankruptcy affected not only Resorts International but also three affiliated entities: Griffin Resorts Inc., Resorts International Financing Inc., and Griffin Resorts Holding Inc.

An active desert resident and supporter of the La Quinta Arts Festival, Griffin owned the Merv Griffin Givenchy Resort & Spa in Palm Springs (later The Parker) and a ranch near La Quinta, California, where he raised thoroughbred racehorses. In County Galway, Ireland, he owned St. Clerans Manor, a boutique hotel on an 18th-century estate previously owned by John Huston. In the 1980s, Griffin purchased the Paradise Island Resort and Casino in the Bahamas for $400 million from Trump, and later sold it for $125 million. Griffin sold his empire to The Coca-Cola Company for $250 million in 1986 and subsequently focused on hotel acquisitions, with his wealth estimated at $1.2 billion in 2003.

== Personal life ==
Griffin was married to Julann Elizabeth Wright, a comedienne and a founder of First Women's Bank of California, from 1958 to 1976. The two met when Griffin appeared as a guest on the Robert Q. Lewis Show. The couple had one son.

In an interview with The New York Times published on May 26, 2005, Merv Griffin "said with a sly grin" about his private life: "I tell everybody that I'm a quarter-sexual, I will do anything with anybody for a quarter." He was otherwise secretive about his business and personal lives.

Following Griffin's death, The Hollywood Reporter published an article stating Griffin was a closeted gay man. This report was later altered after objections from Griffin's friends and business associates.

In 1991, Griffin faced two lawsuits. Deney Terrio, host of the Griffin-created Dance Fever, sued Griffin, filed a sexual harassment lawsuit against him, which was dismissed. That same year, Brent Plott, a former employee who had worked as a bodyguard, horse trainer, and driver, filed a $200 million palimony lawsuit, which was also dismissed. Griffin characterized both lawsuits as extortion attempts. Regarding Plott's lawsuit, Griffin claimed that Plott had been paid $250 a week, lived in one of two apartments under Griffin's former house as part of his security function, and left the payroll six or seven years before the lawsuit. Griffin dismissed the charges as untrue.

Griffin maintained a close friendship with Eva Gabor from the mid-1980s until her death in 1995. Gabor stated in 1990 that they were not romantically involved.

Griffin was a longtime member of the Republican Party.

On being wealthy, Griffin said, "when you walk down the street and everybody knows you're rich, they don't talk to you." His net worth was estimated at over $1 billion. Griffin claimed to not know his exact worth, stating it might cause unnecessary stress.

Griffin shared a birthday with Nancy Reagan on July 6, and they exchanged birthday greetings annually. A close friend of the Reagan family, Griffin served as an honorary pallbearer at Ronald Reagan's funeral in 2004.

== Awards and honors ==
In 1974, Griffin was inducted to the Hollywood Walk of Fame. In 1998, a Golden Palm Star on the Walk of Stars in Palm Springs was dedicated to him. In 2005, Griffin accepted an honorary Doctor of Laws degree from the National University of Ireland, Galway. In 2008, Griffin was posthumously inducted into the Television Hall of Fame.

On September 29, 2022, Merv and Julann Griffin were posthumously inducted into the inaugural class of the Jeopardy! Hall of Fame at the first Jeopardy! Honors event. Their son, Tony, accepted the awards on their behalf.

== Illness and death ==
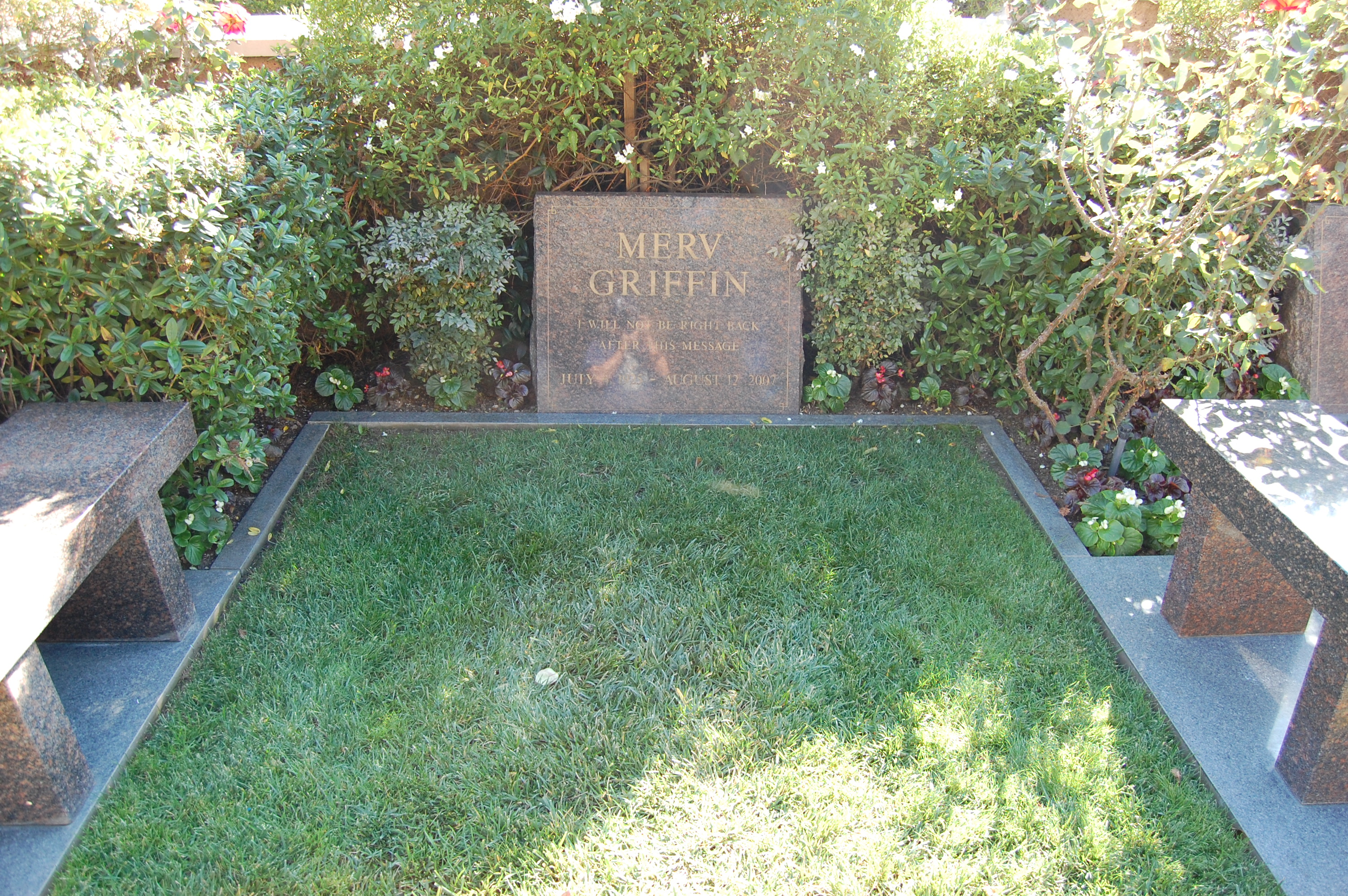
Griffin's grave, located at Westwood Village Memorial Park Cemetery in Westwood, Los Angeles, California

Griffin was treated for prostate cancer in 1996. The cancer returned in 2007. He was admitted to Cedars-Sinai Medical Center in Los Angeles, where his condition deteriorated. He died later on August 12, 2007, at the age of 82.

Funeral services were held on August 17, 2007, at the Church of the Good Shepherd in Beverly Hills. Attendees included Nancy Reagan; Arnold Schwarzenegger, who gave the eulogy with Tony Griffin; Maria Shriver, Pat Sajak, Vanna White, Alex Trebek, Dick Van Dyke, Jack Klugman, Dick Van Patten, Ellen DeGeneres, Portia de Rossi, Ryan Seacrest, Johnny Mathis, Catherine Oxenberg and Casper Van Dien. Pallbearers included Griffin Group vice-chairman Ron Ward, President Robert Pritchard, Vice President Michael Eyre, and Tony Griffin. Griffin's 7-year-old grandson, Donovan Mervyn, and Nancy Reagan were honorary pallbearers, while his 12-year-old granddaughter, Farah, gave a reading. A post-burial reception was held at the Beverly Hilton, owned by Griffin from 1987 to 2003.

Griffin was buried at Pierce Brothers Westwood Village Memorial Park, His epitaph reads, "I will not be right back after this message," an idea he had shared on The Late Late Show with Tom Snyder. In his 2003 book Merv, written with David Bender, he had mentioned an alternate epitaph: "Stay Tuned."

GSN paid tribute to Griffin by airing ten-episode marathons of Wheel of Fortune and Jeopardy! during the weekend of August 18–19, 2007. The Wheel of Fortune marathon included episodes featuring Griffin, such as Pat Sajak's departure from the daytime version in 1989 and a 1992–93 episode where Griffin performed with his band, "The MervTones," and Vanna White at a dinner club in Orlando, Florida. The Jeopardy! marathon featured a rerun of the 2002 Million Dollar Masters Tournament.

In 2013, Griffin's home was sold for $7 million.

== Selected popular songs ==
Some of the songs Griffin recorded were:

- "I've Got a Lovely Bunch of Coconuts"
- "Christmas City"
- "Wilhelmina"
- "Never Been Kissed"
- "The Charanga" (#69, Pop Charts, 1961)
- "Banned in Boston" (#101, Pop Charts, 1961)
- "Happy To Know You" (Radio Hit, 1973)
- "Think!" (longtime theme music for Jeopardy!)
- "Changing Keys" (longtime theme music for Wheel)
