= Shirkat Gah =

Nonprofit organization in Lahore, Pakistan

- شرکت گاہ
- Formation: 1975
- Type: Women's organization
- Purpose: Resource and publication centre
- Location: Pakistan
- Website: shirkatgah.org

Shirkat Gah women's resource centre is a women's rights organization in Pakistan which focuses on research, publications and advocacy on women's issues.

== History ==
Shirkat Gah was established in 1975 by Najma Sadeque (journalist, human rights activist, environmental writer) with a group of 7 like-minded women. Shirkat Gah was established as a resource and publication center for women to promote their economic and social development and to carry out related research and awareness-raising.

In the beginning, Shirkat Gah helped working women by starting women's hostel and day-care centers. Women members of Shirkat Gah played key role in the formation of Women's Action Forum in 1981 along with members of other women's organizations such as Simorgh, Aurat Foundation, Applied Socio-Economic Resource Center (ASR) and Society for Advancement of Education (SAHE).

== Works ==
Shirkat Gah has conducted research and organized policy dialogues on various issues related to women such as abortion, child marriage, the impact of COVID-19 on women, and domestic violence.

== Notable Members ==
- Zohra Yusuf (joined in 1978)
- Farida Shaheed
- Hilda Saeed
- Aisha Gazdar
- Fauzia Viqar
