= Hilda Saeed =

Pakistani women's rights activist, journalist and scientist

- Born: Hilda Josiah; November 14, 1936; Baroda, Baroda State, British India
- Died: May 14, 2025 (aged 88); Karachi, Pakistan
- Education: DJ Science College; University of Karachi (MSW)
- Occupations: Activist; Scientist; Journalist; Feminist Scholar
- Known for: Co-founding Women's Action Forum; Chair of Shirkat Gah
- Spouse: Mazhar Saeed (m. 1962)
- Children: Rahal Saeed
- Website: shirkatgah.org

Hilda Saeed (née Josiah; 14 November 1936 – 14 May 2025) was a Pakistani women's rights activist, journalist, and scientist who became a foundational figure in the country's feminist movement. For nearly five decades, she was at the forefront of the struggle for social justice in Pakistan, most notably as a co-founder of the Women's Action Forum (WAF) and the longtime chairperson of the Shirkat Gah Women's Resource Centre. Her work was characterized by a multi-pronged approach that combined street-level protest against discriminatory laws with the strategic building of institutions dedicated to women's health, legal aid, and political empowerment.

Before she became a full-time activist, Saeed built a distinguished career in science. She is recognized as Pakistan's first female serologist. It was this work in the late 1970s that served as the catalyst for her life's mission. Her role in establishing the Sindh government's first Forensic Sciences Department brought her into direct contact with the evidence of violent crimes against women. The experience of scientifically verifying these crimes while seeing the victims denied justice under the newly enacted Hudood Ordinances created an unbearable moral conflict, compelling her to shift her focus from the laboratory to direct political action.

As a public intellectual, Saeed championed reproductive health rights, campaigned for the rights of religious minorities, and used her journalism to bring taboo subjects into the national discourse. In recognition of her work, she was nominated as part of the 1000 PeaceWomen initiative for the Nobel Peace Prize in 2005.

== Early Life and Personal Background ==
=== Family and Upbringing ===
Hilda Josiah was born in Baroda (now Vadodara), India, on November 14, 1936, the first of five children of Alfred and Suman Josiah. Her family moved to Karachi in October 1937, when she was 11 months old.

She was raised in a cosmopolitan Karachi that she remembered as a lively mix of Hindus, Parsis, Christians, Jews, and Muslims. Her family had a diverse group of friends, and she recalled with fondness celebrating a wide array of festivals, including Diwali, Holi, and Navroz. This multicultural harmony was profoundly disrupted by the Partition of India in 1947. She witnessed the sectarian riots that engulfed the city, later recalling the curfews and watching as neighbors and friends left for India. During this time, her father was given the option to relocate but made the conscious choice to remain in Pakistan, putting his faith in Muhammad Ali Jinnah's promise of equality for non-Muslims.

As the eldest child, she was incredibly responsible, taking on a motherly role for her younger siblings. She would take them to and from school, supervise their homework, and instill a lifelong passion for reading in others by frequently recommending and gifting books. A voracious reader herself, she would often climb a neem tree outside their house to find a quiet space to read or do her own homework.

=== Education ===
Saeed's own academic journey provided the framework for her later work. After attending St. Joseph's College, she moved to the prominent DJ Science College in 1957. She described the shift from the "cloistered surroundings of a women's college" to the co-educational and politically active environment of DJ College and its student union as an "elating experience." It was here she was introduced to the ideas of the Democratic Students' Federation (DSF) and gained a new awareness of rights and democracy.

She went on to the University of Karachi in 1958, the same year that General Ayub Khan came to power in Pakistan's first military coup. She noted that this political shift marked the beginning of the erosion of students' rights and academic freedoms, providing a direct, early experience with state repression. Complementing her scientific training, she earned a Masters in Social Work from the University of Karachi in 1960, giving her a formal academic foundation in the social and community issues she would later champion. This unique combination of scientific training, a degree in social work, and a political awakening during her university years provided the foundation for her future career.

=== Interfaith Marriage ===
In 1962, Hilda married Mazhar Saeed, a Muslim, whom she had met during her college years. The act went against the wishes of both of their families, and as a Christian woman married to a Muslim, she faced sustained pressure from both her own community and her in-laws to convert. Despite this, she remained steadfast in her Christian faith throughout her life. This personal struggle with religious and social prejudice became a bedrock of her public activism, directly informing her lifelong campaign for the rights of religious minorities.

Her husband's own background as a student activist was a crucial source of support for her work at a time when it was not socially acceptable. In a later panel discussion, Saeed noted that while many men in her social circle initially resented her activism, her husband was different. She stated, "I was very lucky. My husband was a founder member of DSF The Democratic Students Federation, so he understood. And there I had support, but not from anyone else."

== Career in Science, Journalism, and Activism ==
Hilda Saeed's professional life was multifaceted, moving from a distinguished career in science to becoming a leading journalist, scholar, and public intellectual for the feminist movement. Her career can be understood through the evolution of her public role over several decades.

=== 1960–1978: Professor and Scientist ===
Before becoming a full-time activist, Saeed built a career in science and academia that spanned eighteen years. She worked as a college professor, teaching microbiology at S.M. Science College and St. Joseph's College for Women, and also worked as a medical researcher. Her belief in education as a tool for freedom was a guiding principle throughout her life. This was demonstrated not just in her advocacy but in her personal actions; while teaching at S.M. College, she learned of a local pickle vendor who could not afford to educate her four sons. Hilda quietly arranged for all four boys to attend the college, paying for their tuition at her own expense, believing that education "could lift you up from poverty."

=== Late 1970s – Early 1980s: The Whistleblower and Journalist ===
In the late 1970s, Saeed's scientific career took a pivotal turn. As a woman in a highly specialized field, she played an instrumental role in establishing the Sindh government's Forensic Sciences Department, serving as Pakistan's first female forensic serologist. Her work involved the scientific analysis of evidence from violent crimes, which brought her into direct contact with the brutal realities of sexual violence against women and children.

This experience, combined with the legal framework of the Hudood Ordinances which could punish victims of rape for the crime of zina (adultery), created an unbearable moral conflict. It served as the primary catalyst for her shift from science into full-time activism. During this period, her public voice emerged. A friend at the Karachi newspaper The Star encouraged her to write about the cases she was seeing, transforming her into a journalist whose work was fueled by scientific evidence. She was soon identified as a leader of street protests against the Zia regime's restrictive policies.

=== 1980s: The Activist and Institution Builder ===
By the 1980s, Saeed was a full-time human rights activist and a central figure in the women's movement. In 1978, she joined Shirkat Gah, where she would eventually serve two terms as Chair of the Board. In 1981, she co-founded the Women's Action Forum (WAF), a direct response to the infamous Fahmida and Allah Bux case. In 1983, she founded and edited National Health, Pakistan's first public health magazine, using it as a platform to introduce and champion the concept of "reproductive health rights" in the country. She also co-founded the Pakistan Reproductive Health Network and was instrumental in establishing Panah, a shelter for survivors of domestic violence.

=== 1990s: The International Expert and Feminist Scholar ===
During the politically turbulent 1990s, Saeed's activism adapted. She became an internationally recognized policy expert, serving as a consultant for major global organizations, including UNICEF and the Population Council. Her writing became more analytical and scholarly. In 1995, she published her feminist critique of religion in the chapter, "'Not one of His best efforts: world religions and women's oppression'". She remained a sharp political commentator, stating in a 1997 interview with UK's The Times that she could not "think of any women politicians who have stood up for women's rights." Her scholarly work continued with the 2000 academic chapter "Legalised Cruelty: Anti-Women Laws in Pakistan."

=== 2000s – 2020s: The Historian and Matriarch ===
In her later years, Saeed took on the role of a senior stateswoman and historian of the movement. In 2005, she was nominated for the Nobel Peace Prize. Her writing became more personal and reflective, as seen in her 2009 tribute to her friend Dr. Sarwar and her 2010 autobiographical chapter, "Karachi, Then . . . and Now." Her final major work was the 2021 book, Survivors: Stories from Panah, where she acted as an archivist for the stories of women survivors. She remained engaged with the movement, attending the modern Aurat March to show her support for the new generation of feminists.

== Legacy ==
Hilda Saeed leaves behind a profound legacy as a social architect of Pakistan's modern feminist movement. Her most tangible impact lies in the enduring institutions she helped build. Organizations like the Women's Action Forum (WAF), Shirkat Gah, and the Panah shelter continue to provide a critical framework for legal aid, political protest, and social support decades after their founding. By establishing National Health magazine and the Pakistan Reproductive Health Network, she created platforms that permanently shifted the national discourse on women's health and reproductive rights.

Her intellectual legacy was defined by her courage to broach taboo subjects. As a feminist scholar, she wrote critically on the intersection of religion and women's oppression, and her analysis was influential, cited by other academics and activists studying the women's movement in Pakistan. A defining trait noted by many was her profound humility; she consistently preferred to let her work speak for itself rather than seek personal accolades.

Her legacy is also carried on through her family. Her daughter, Rahal Saeed, built an international career as a global health professional specializing in the very fields her mother pioneered: sexual and reproductive health and rights and gender equality. She has advised major institutions like the Gates Foundation on family planning grants in Pakistan and served as a Country Director for health policy programs. Her granddaughter, Adeera Batlay, reflects Hilda's scientific spirit through her own work as a published geosciences researcher, conducting fieldwork and presenting her findings at international scientific conferences.

In her own words, Hilda Saeed summarized the goal of her life's struggle:

Maybe someday our future generations will succeed in making Pakistan what we want it to be — a country that is secular, that values each human life, where each individual has human rights, equality, healthcare and education, and a chance to grow to her or his full human potential.

— Hilda Saeed,

== Selected works ==
- Saeed, Hilda (2021). Survivors: Stories from Panah. Karachi: Oxfam.
- Saeed, Hilda; Khan, Ayesha (2000). "Legalised Cruelty: Anti-Women Laws in Pakistan". In Mirsky, Judith; Radlett, Marty (eds.). No Paradise Yet: The World's Women Face the New Century. London: Zed Books.
- Saeed, Hilda (2010). "Karachi, Then . . . and Now". KARACHI: Our Stories in Our Words. The Citizens Archive of Pakistan.
- Founder and editor of National Health magazine (1983–c.1999).
- Columnist for Dawn.
