= Najma Sadeque =

- Born: 1943; Bengal, British India
- Died: 8 January 2015 (aged 71–72); Karachi
- Occupations: Journalist, author, human rights activist
- Known for: Founding of Shirkat Gah (1975); Women's Action Forum (WAF), Pakistan (1986)
- Notable work: How They Run Pakistan, How They Run the World, and others

Najma Sadeque (1943 – 8 January 2015) from Pakistan was a leading woman journalist, author, human rights activist, particularly of women's rights, an artist, environmentalist, and painter. She also did research on socioeconomic issues and authored many books and wrote articles. She co-founded Shirkat Gah in 1975, a women's NGO to highlight human rights violations against women. She also co-founded the Women’s Action Forum (WAF), Pakistan.

== Biography ==
Sadeque was born in 1943 in Bengal, British India and was brought up in East Pakistan (now Bangladesh) in an atmosphere of land farming which dictated her future thinking. She studied at the Viqarunnisa Noon School and College in Dhaka and was known for her special skill in writing in English. After her marriage she moved to Karachi where she initially worked as a copywriter for an advertising agency. When she was 19 she held her first exhibition of paintings in Karachi.

Sadeque started working as a journalist for several newspapers, initially with Dawn and then worked for The News and The News International.

In 1975, perturbed by the extent of human rights violations in her country, Sadeque, along with seven others, established an NGO called Shirkat Gah. She also founded the Women's Action Forum (WAF) in Pakistan in 1981; this was mainly dictated by the violations of women's rights under the laws promulgated by General Zia-ul-Haq, then President of Pakistan. She produced the "WE – a weekly magazine" for The News, later renamed as "The News on Friday" and further changed to "The News on Sunday", which covered a wide spectrum of topics. After leaving The News, she worked as a freelance journalist for several newspapers, including The News, on subjects related to human rights, gender issues, and the environment. After she discontinued working for the newspapers, she devoted her time mostly to promote the activities of the Shirkat Gah and the WAF.

== Death ==
Sadeque died of renal failure and chest congestion at Karachi on 8 January 2015 at the age of 72. Deneb Sumbul, her daughter, who is a producer of documentaries, said in an obituary to her mother:

In how many ways can I describe my wonderful indomitable mother – she wore so many hats – an activist to the last, journalist for over 35 years, one of the founding members of WAF and someone who had so many interests and never short on wonderful ideas and new perspectives".

In her last article published in the "You magazine" of The News, Sadeque wrote: "Activists have to boost women's courage to exercise their vote accordingly. It has everything to do with human rights and democracy. Start talking".

== Publications ==
Sadeque, based on her extensive research, authored many books and articles, such as How They Run Pakistan, How They Run the World, How They Kill the World, Financial Terrorism, and Ground Realities. Her articles also included in many international publications and books. At the time of her death, she was editing the English translation of her mother Dr. Syeda Fatima Sadeque's work on Quran.
