= Fauzia Viqar =

Pakistani human rights activist

Fauzia Viqar is a Pakistani human rights activist with a focus on women's rights. She served as the first chairperson of the Punjab Commission on the Status of Women from 2014 to 2019. Fauzia Viqar appointed as Inaugural Chair of OICOA Sub-Committee

== Education ==
Viqar has a master's degree in Political Science from McMaster University in Ontario, Canada.

== Career and activism ==
Viqar worked as the advocacy director for the non-profit organisation Shirkat Gah Women's Resource Centre from 2010 to 2014. Her advocacy efforts at the organisation included work on honour killings and domestic violence. She was a co-author of the civil society-endorsed shadow report titled Obstructing Progress: Growing Talibanisation & Poor Governance in Pakistan presented for Pakistan's periodic review of the Convention on the Elimination of all Forms of Discrimination Against Women in 2013.

Since August 2019, she has worked as the chief executive officer of the consultancy firm Rah Center for Management & Development.

=== Punjab Commission on the Status of Women ===
In February 2014, the Punjab Assembly passed the Punjab Commission on the Status of Women Act. The Act provided for the establishment of a commission to work on women empowerment in the province. The commission's mandate includes review of laws, policies, and programs with the mission to improve the socioeconomic development of women and to end all forms of discrimination against women.

Viqar was appointed as the first chairperson of the Punjab Commission on the Status of Women (PCSW) on 8 March 2014. Under her leadership, the PCSW developed a gender management information system, started publishing annual gender parity reports for the province, and launched a telephone helpline for women to report abuse. During Viqar's tenure, the commission also launched a smartphone app to help women report incidents of harassment to the police department.

The Women Development Department of the Government of Punjab, which is the public body overseeing the PCSW, served a one-month notice of termination to Viqar to remove her as PCSW chairperson on 21 May 2019.

In 2023, she was appointed as the Federal Ombudsperson for Protection against Harassment at Workplace.
