= First Women's Bank of California =

Defunct American financial institution

The First Women's Bank of California
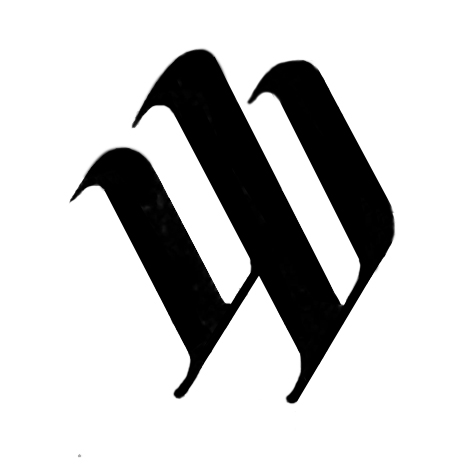
- Founded: November 1976
- Headquarters: 12301 Wilshire Blvd. Los Angeles, California
- Area served: Southern California
- Key people: Julann Griffin, Cappy Fogel

The First Women's Bank of California was a Los Angeles-based bank dedicated to helping women save money and establish credit. It operated from 1976 until its sale in 1984.

The bank was founded by a group of area businesswomen, which included Virginia Mullan, Laura Liswood, "Cappy"(Gladys) Fogel, Betty Lessner, Veryl Mortenson, Lee Agajanian, Dianne Freestone (Modisett) Kully, Helene Beck and Julann Elizabeth Wright Griffin. Griffin is the former wife of producer/entertainer Merv Griffin, and she was instrumental in convincing celebrities to buy stock in the bank and open accounts.

Florence Henderson was the bank's first customer, and eventually Jane Fonda, Loretta Swit, Phyllis Diller, Farrah Fawcett, and Anne Bancroft all had accounts there.

The bank's mission was generally feminist. The bank therefore focused managing women’s money, especially after divorce, although the bank’s founders publicly disavowed feminism as their mission on several occasions.

Ironically, when the bank’s board members first searched for a CEO, they were unable to find a qualified woman. Therefore, Rowan Henry, a man, was hired. By late 1976, more than $1.5 million in First Women’s Bank stock had been sold to about 1,300 shareholders, 63% of whom were women.

Asked in Occidental College’s alumni magazine what it meant to be a bank for women, board member Dianne Modisett answered, "It means that we eliminate discrimination on the basis of sex. An individual must still qualify for credit or a loan, but if she doesn't, we want to assist her in becoming qualified…It doesn't make any difference to us whether the woman is single, married, divorced, or widowed."

First Women's Bank was sold in 1984 for $2.7 million and reorganized as the Guaranty Bank of California, now GBC International Bank.
