= Islamic marital practices =

Marriage rituals for Muslims

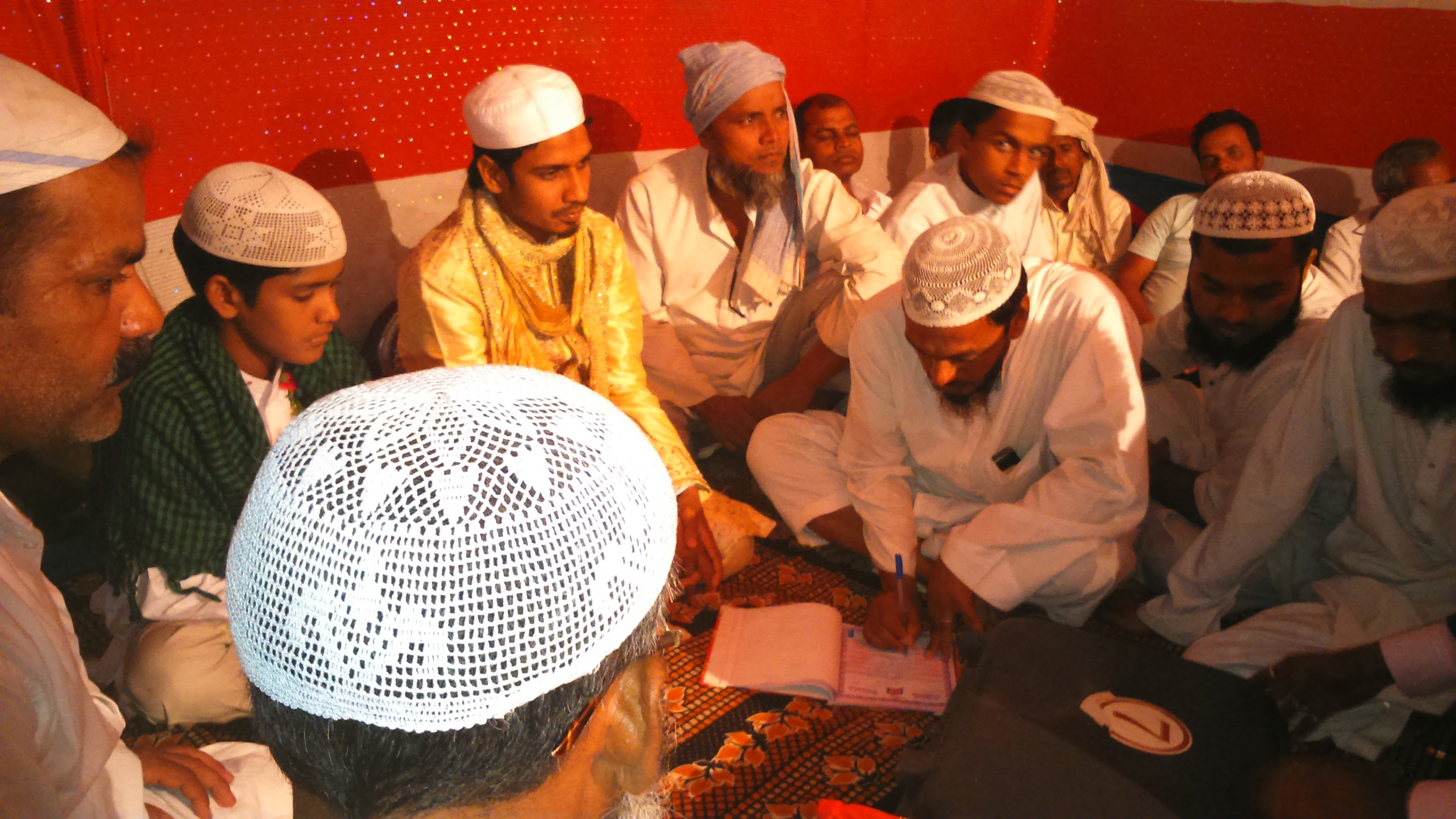
A wedding ceremony in Bihar India

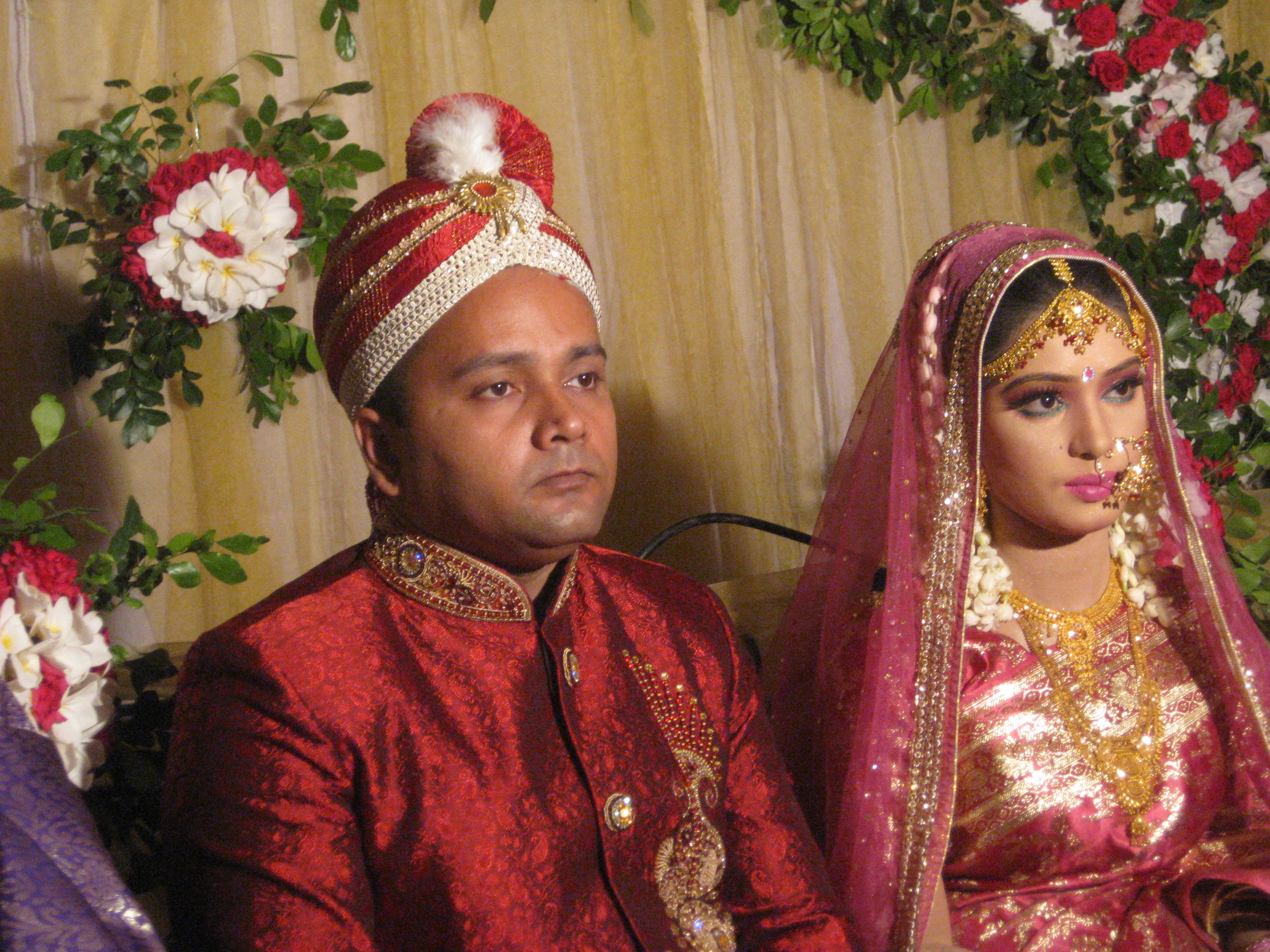
Bangladeshi bride and groom

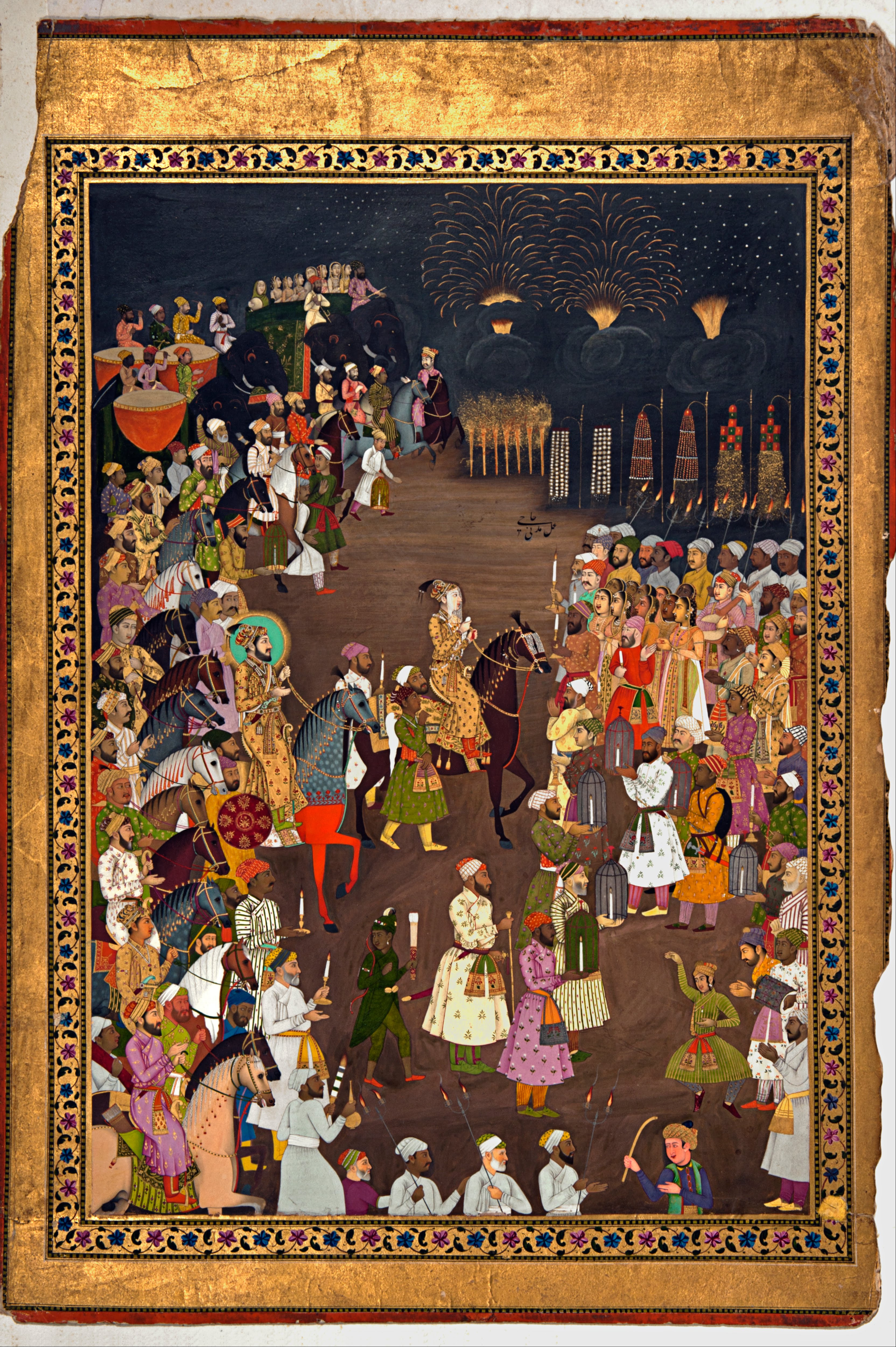
The Mughal Emperor Shah Jahan attending the marriage procession of his eldest son Dara Shikoh. Mughal era fireworks were ignited in order to brighten the night throughout the wedding ceremony.

Islamic marital or nikah practices are traditions and practices that relate to wedding ceremonies and marriage rituals between a man and a woman in the Muslim world. Muslims are guided by Islamic laws and practices specified in the Quran, but Islamic marriage customs and relations vary by country of origin and government regulations, and non-Muslim practices (cakes, rings, music) sometimes appear despite the efforts of revivalists and reformers.

Islam encourages early marriage, not preceded by dating between the prospective bride and groom, as Islamic law places "strict conditions on interactions" between the opposite sexes. Consequently, mainstream Islamic marriages tend to be "family affairs" where parents and other older relatives are involved in match making. Islamic marital jurisprudence allows Muslim men to be married to multiple women (a maximum of four at one time).

== Marriage customs ==
While there can be differences in marriage practices among Muslims, there are several steps to a marriage usually shared in the religion—including the ceremonies khitbah (arranging a partner), nikah (agreement-to-marry ceremony), zifaf/rukhsati ("sending off"), and walimah (wedding banquet).

=== Early marriage ===
Young Muslim males and females are strongly encouraged to marry as soon as possible, since the family is considered the foundation of Islamic society, and fornication i.e. pre-marital sex, is forbidden.

While the Quran mentions “baligh” (puberty) as a marker of maturity, and reaching puberty is often interpreted as the minimum age for marriage, (although physical and emotional maturity is agreed to be important), Muslim-majority countries (Note: and of course non-Muslim countries, that many Muslims live in) have minimum ages for marriage, (for example, the minimum age for marriage was 18 for both men and women in Egypt, 19 for women and 21 for men in Indonesia). (Note: as of 2024) In Pakistan and Afghanistan, child marriages is illegal but still occurs due to "weak enforcement" and "deeply rooted cultural practices".

=== Khitbah ===
The combination of encouraging early marriage and forbidding interaction between marriageable males and females (such as dating) means that traditionally, if not always, it has been the partners’ families that arrange for suitable partner for their child and then introduces them to each other. This way, (in theory) the union is about compatibility rather than infatuation or sexual desire.

The first step in Islamic marriage where representatives of the prospective bride and groom get to know and vet each other, is called the khitbah (Arabic: خطبة, romanized: khitbah, lit. 'betrothal').

Typically, the proposal is initiated from one interested side, but it may also occur through matchmaking from friends and acquaintances. The parties will compare personalities, values, and life plans for compatibility with each other, and may use pre-marital counselling. Traditionally the two potentials are prohibited from touching each other or being alone with each other, and conversations are closely supervised. Additionally, a woman who wear hijab covering her face (such as niqab) is permitted to unveil in order for the suitor to see her face.

If both parties agree to move forward, they will then enter the committed stage, somewhat akin to "engagement". If not they part ways (on good terms, hopefully).

While the couple are still prohibited from meeting privately and from touching, their families may begin planning the coming formalities. The word fiancé is not used in Islam, but other terms may be used depending on the region. For example, in Urdu-speaking populations, they are called rishta (potential marriage proposal).

There are different traditions for khitbah in different Islamic societies:

- Arab cultures emphasize the familial approval involved in khitbah which may involve elaborate ceremonies.
- South Asian Islamic cultures often emphasizes social and familial alliance including an exchange of gifts and jewelry.
- Southeast Asian cultures sometimes integrating local customs and traditions highlighting a more communal engagement.

==== Halal dating ====
One source describes a pious alternative to arranged marriages in the form of "halal dating". In this practice Muslim men and women meet and get to know each other on a "date", but avoid the temptation to have any physical contact by meeting in public places with a chaperone or a group of friends, and focusing on the "purity, faith, personality and mindset" of the potential partner.

==== Mahr, dowry and gifts ====
A required part of a Muslim marriage is a gift, known as a Mahr, given by the groom to the bride. How much and what form it takes should be agreed upon beforehand. The Quran states:

- “And give the women upon marriage their dowries graciously.” (Q.4:4)

The Mahr (donatio propter nuptias) differs from a marriage dowry or gift, in that it is mandatory for a Muslim marriage and is paid by the groom to the bride for her exclusive use. Mahr functions similar to bride wealth.

==== Announcement ====
Because a secret marriage may lead to confusion or disputes, and because recognition of the couple's new status by the community reinforces the couple's commitment, it is recommended that the announcement of the marriage be made publicly. This is often done through gatherings or public statements.

=== Wedding/Nikah ===
After the mahr has been settled, the couple can become husband and wife upon completion of the nikah ceremony. This usually has two stages—a verbal agreement and a signing of the marriage contract.

The nikah ceremony requires the groom, the bride, the bride's wali (her Islamic legal guardian, usually her father), two Muslim witnesses, and an officiant. The person officiating is usually an Imam, but the location may be a private home or office of a judge (qadi) rather than a mosque. The wali will first ask for the bride's consent and then for the groom's commitment, before officially announcing the marriage.

The verbal aspect involves both the bride and groom responding "Qubool" (meaning "I accept") three times. This is followed by the written aspect, signing the marriage contract. From this point on, they are a married couple. Following the acceptance of the nikah and the witnessing of it, those present recite the fatihah (the opening surah of the Quran).

==== Khutbah ====
Next comes the wedding sermon (khutbah) which typically starts with three verses from the Holy Qur’an (Surah An-Nisa 4:1, Surah Al Imran 3:102, and Surah Al-Ahzab 33:70), and one hadith,

- Praise be to Allah, we seek His help and His forgiveness. We seek refuge with Allah from the evil of our own souls and from our bad deeds. Whomsoever Allah guides will never be led astray, and whomsoever Allah leaves astray, no one can guide. I bear witness that there is no god but Allah, and I bear witness that Muhammad is His slave and Messenger (Sunan An Nisaa'i)

This recitation is called Khutbat Al-Haajah ("The Sermon for Necessities").

==== Offer Du’a and seek blessings ====
After the Nikah is concluded, a Du’a is recited to ask for a blessing of the marriage, following the advice of this hadith of Muhammad:

- “When one of you marries, let him say: ‘May Allah bless you and unite you in goodness.'” (Sunan Ibn Majah)

==== Headgear ====
Out of tradition, many Muslim grooms opt to wear the Imama turban at the wedding ceremony. The pheta turban is common in South Asia, but is discouraged by Salafi and western scholars due to its non-Islamic connotations.

==== Rings ====
Some Muslim couples have adopted the practice of wearing wedding rings. It is another practice that some scholars have forbidden the practice on the grounds that it imitates non-Muslims.

=== Walima ===
A Walima is a banquet that functions much like a wedding reception. A Walima may occur the same day as a Nikah or months later. It may take place at a banquet hall or other large venue. It is organized and paid for by the groom's side. Some Muslim couples have adopted the foreign practice of having a wedding cake at the Walima, but at least some scholars advise that if a cake must be eaten, kufr practices such as eating cake in public should be avoided.

=== Sending off ===
The zifaf ("sending off" of the couple to spend time together alone, typically, but not necessarily, leading to consummation) is a sharia term. Rukhsati (the beginning of living together as husband and wife) is the term used by South Asians. A third term for the consummation of the marriage is dukhul or dukhlah, which is used in Arab countries. Sending off typically happen a few hours after the nikah or at least after the wedding banquet, but it is permissible in Islam to wait a few months or years, (for example, until the groom has earned enough money to pay the mahr).

== Requirements, restrictions, forbidden practices ==
=== Consent ===
The majority of scholars, namely the Hanafi, Maliki, and Hanbali, consider the approval of the bride and the groom who reached puberty one of the conditions of the marriage contract. Shafi'i recommends strongly that daughters who are no longer minors be consulted before being married to someone.

The Hanafi, Maliki and Hanbali schools of jurisprudence do not allow "forced marriages", where consent has not been given by the bride or groom, or is given only under excessive pressure.

This does not mean that parents/family are not allowed to persuade the prospective bride to do what the parents/family feel the bride should do. In at least one country (UK), researchers who talked to Muslim parents of marriageable daughters, found that the parents "generally agreed that physical force is unacceptable, psychological and emotional pressure is not considered to be coercion", according to Baroness Sayeeda Warsi, a Muslim United Kingdom Conservative Party spokeswoman on community cohesion. Another study in the UK quoted a parent who used what they called "hard counselling ... to brainwash her mind .... If you wanna call [it that]" to deal with a daughter who tried to marry a non-Muslim. Researchers Samad and Eade also write that at least in the UK, Muslim and other immigrant parents often resort to forced marriages to control daughters after displays of "sexuality and independence" by them. In Nigeria (whose population is approximately half Muslim) the website Online Nigeria states that "parental consent is necessary for the valid celebration of marriage under Islamic law". Consent to the marriage by the girl's marriage guardian "is mandatory".

==== Arranging for witnesses ====
Two adult male Muslims are required to witness the Nikah ceremony. A sahih hadith quotes Muhammad as saying:

- “There is no Nikah without a wali (guardian) and two witnesses.” (Sunan Abu Dawood)

=== Polygamy ===
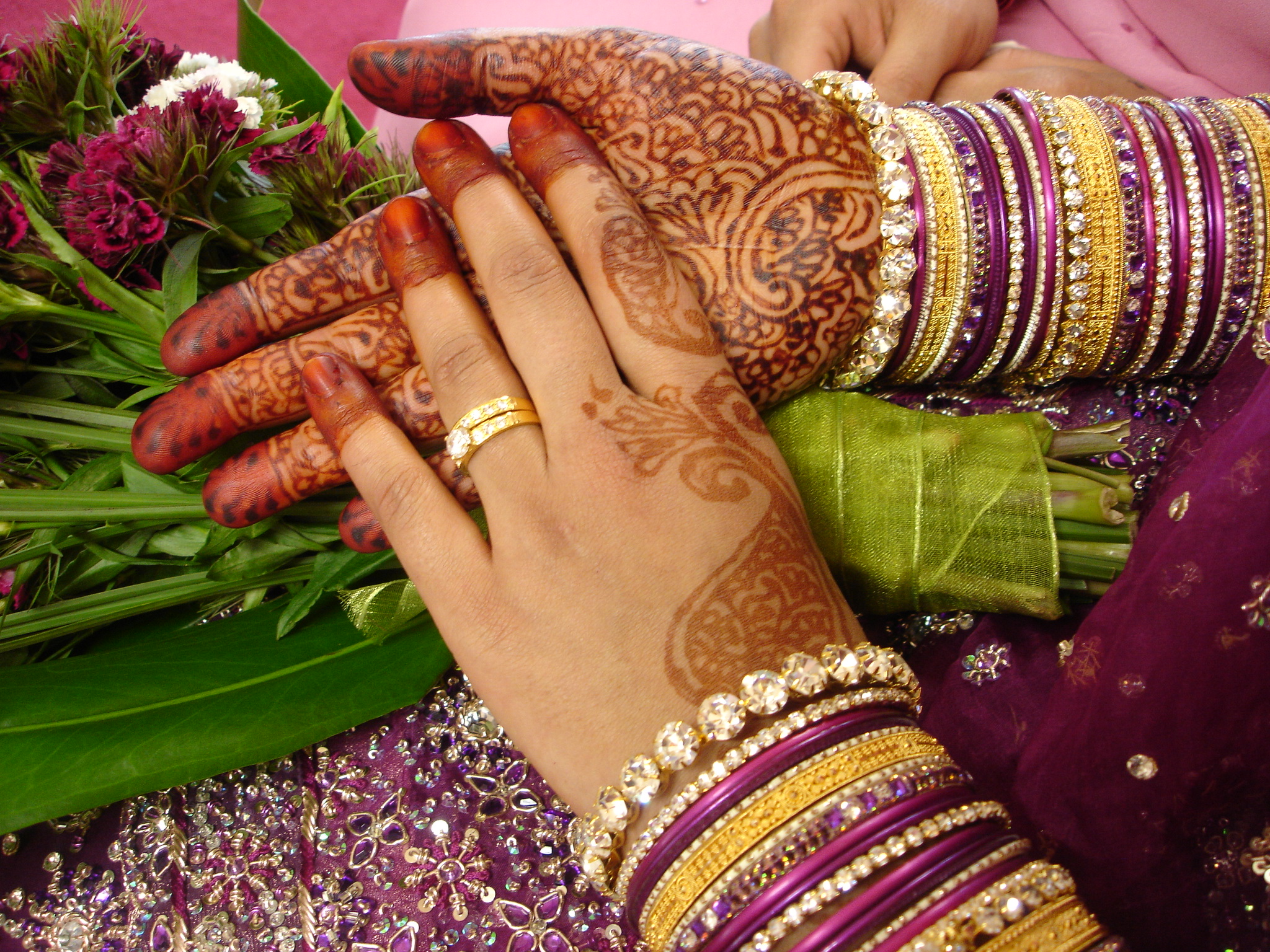
Bridal henna of a Bengali bride. Application of mehndi or henna is common for Muslims brides in many cultures.

In Islam, a man is allowed up to four wives at a time (polygyny) with certain restrictions. The Quran states:

- "...Marry of the women that you please: two, three, or four. But if you feel that you should not be able to deal justly, then only one or what your right hand possesses. That would be more suitable to prevent you from doing injustice." (Q.4:3).

A wife is allowed no more than one husband (polyandry is forbidden).

Polygamy is legal, though often with restrictions, in most Muslim majority countries and most African countries, and illegal most everywhere else. Since the 20th century, changing economic conditions, female empowerment, and acceptance of family planning practices, have led to the decline in polygynous marriages within the Muslim world. (Turkey and Tunisia have completely outlawed it). Nonetheless, it is still legal in most countries in the developing world, including over 150 countries in Africa and the Middle East, including a group of countries in West and Central sub-Saharan Africa, sometimes referred to as the “polygamy belt”. In the two most polygynous countries in that region — Nigeria and Burkina Faso — 40% of the Muslim population lives in polygynous households as of 2019.

Notwithstanding its illegality in Western countries, a 2008 estimate of the number of people in Muslim polygynous families in the U.S. was 50,000 to 100,000, and the number of Muslim polygamous families in the UK as of 2014 was estimated to be at 20,000.

=== Separation of the sexes ===
At least among conservative Muslims, unnecessary direct conversation between prospective bride and groom before the Nikah is forbidden as it would be between any other two non-mahram (i.e. non-family members). Negotiation and proposals of marriage should be done through parents or guardians. Also prohibited is kissing before the Nikah—notwithstanding its prominent place in non-Muslim marriages.

=== Interfaith marriage ===
Islamic law "generally" forbids Muslim women from marrying non-Muslim men, but allows Muslim men to marry Christian or Jewish women under "specific conditions". The justification often given for this restriction is the need to preserve Islamic values and to avoid any conflicts that might arise from different religious obligations within a marriage.

Two verses of the Quran that address the issue of interfaith marriage are Surah Al-Ma'idah Quran 5:5 that permits Muslim men to marry chaste believing women "who have been given the Book" (i.e. Christian or Jewish women), and Surah Al-Mumtahanah Quran 60:10 which forbids marriage to "unbelieving women".

However, in the 21st century marriages between Muslim women and non-Muslim men have become "more and more" frequent in various parts of the world—for example, in the United States, about 10% of Muslim women are married to Non-Muslim men. This has met with "varying degrees" of acceptance, but a considerable amount of opposition from the majority of Orthodox Islamic scholars and interpreters, such as Hassan Al-Turabi.

=== Genital cutting and circumcision ===
Circumcision has been called one of the "five practices" connected to the Fitrah (innate nature in Islam). In early Islamic era, it was considered by some Arab tribes to be "an indispensable prerequisite for marriage" according to author Raphael Patai. In the Shafi'i school of fiqh, circumcision is mandatory (wajib) and in the other three madhab (Hanafi, Maliki, and Hanbali schools) it is recommended (mustahabb). In the largest Arab country, Egypt, over 80% of women have undergone circumcision. In Somalia and Djibouti the rate is even higher as of 2024. However, although FGM has a "long history" in Egypt were it has been "quasi-universal", as of 2020 there has reportedly been a "steady decline" in FGM "in all segments" of Egyptian society.

Female circumcision is not an exclusively Islamic practice, was a pre-Islamic practice and is found in non-Islamic majority African countries, but is now highly controversial (referred to female genital mutilation) and condemned by World Health Organization, for the pain, disfigurement and adverse health effects involved. The rationale for female circumcision is that it either prevents the girl from wanting to engage in illicit premarital sex (in the case of clitoridectomy), or makes it altogether impossible for her (if infibulation is performed), until her vulva is again cut or forced open. At least some Islamic scholars (Ebrahim Desai) argue that the only Islamically allowed circumcision is the least invasive type, known as 1-a, which removes only the clitoral hood.

=== Forbidden marriages: mahram and others ===
Quranic verse 4:23 gives a list of relatives Muslims are forbidden to marry, a class of people known as mahram (family members with whom marriage is permanently unlawful or haram):

your mothers, your daughters, your sisters, your paternal and maternal aunts, your brother's daughters, your sister's daughters, your foster-mothers, your foster-sisters, your mothers-in-law, your stepdaughters under your guardianship if you have consummated marriage with their mothers—but if you have not, then you can marry them—nor the wives of your own sons, nor two sisters together at the same time—except what was done previously. Surely Allah is All-Forgiving, Most Merciful. (Q.4:23)

Also forbidden to marry is anyone of the same sex, anyone who has had the same wetnurse feed them, anyone who is a polytheist. Not forbidden are cousins, including first cousins, as these are not mahram.

== Less conventional marriages ==
In addition to the traditional marriages there are some Islamic marriages that lack some of the customary rights and obligations of marriage.

=== Mut'a ===
A fixed-term marriage known as zawāj al-mut'ah ("temporary" or "pleasure" marriage), is a private and verbal temporary marriage contract that is practiced only in Twelver Shia Islam. Traditionally, a temporary marriage does not require witnesses or registration, though witnesses are recommended. The duration of the marriage and the mahr must be specified and agreed upon in advance, and may be as brief as an hour or last several years. Though religiously sanctioned, it is socially stigmatized, and opposed by both feminists and religious conservatives on the grounds that it encourages prostitution. In 2013, the BBC reported its use among young British Shia as a pre-marital way of "getting to know" someone of the opposite sex "without breaking the bounds of Sharia".

=== Misyar ===
Nikah Misyar lacks some of the conventional marital conditions such as living together, but is permitted by some Sunni scholars. It is not temporary, but does "usually end in divorce or abandonment". Most misyar brides don't change their residences but pursue marriage on a visitation basis. Because the practice relieves the misyar husband of the obligation to support his wife, it is often used in some Islamic countries by men who cannot afford an orthodox marriage, and/or wish to give a legal recognition to behavior that might otherwise be considered adulterous.

=== 'urfi ===
Nikah 'urfi is a "customary" marriage contract that commonly requires a Wali (Islamic legal guardian) and witnesses but is not officially registered with state authorities. Usually a written statement that the two are married, is signed by the couple and at least two witnesses, although a cassette tape with a recording of their commitment may be used as documentation. 'Urfi marriages are sometimes performed with no witnesses, but scholars consider such marriages to be “nikah faasid”—a corrupt or invalid marriage.

At least according to Madiha Al Safty, (Note: Professor of Sociology at the American University in Cairo)) the 'Urfi marriage has a long tradition but its rationale tends to change over time.

"In the past, it was common among the widows of soldiers who had huge pensions and they did not want to lose it by officially re-marrying. Now, however, it is mostly among university students and young couples who cannot afford the high cost of marriage."

(By "some estimates", as many as 20% of Egyptian university students are in `urfi marriages.)

=== Proxy marriages ===
Nikah is permitted by proxy (i.e. via the telephone or video link), simply by both parties (or representatives on their behalf) exchanging declarations. This has caused issues in Western countries, such as the United Kingdom, which do not view proxy marriages as legitimate.

== Islamic matchmaking practices and community programs ==
To accommodate Islamic practices—early marriage, no dating, etc.--in Muslim-majority countries there are Islamic institutions and networks (imams, communities of families, friends, and services) to help marriageable Muslim men and women find socially acceptable partners within the framework of Islamic traditions.

Matchmaking or finding a Muslim spouse in countries where Muslim are a minority is more problematic. In addition to the mosque imam providing guidance for individuals who do not have a Muslim social network, there are also Islamic institutions (at least in the U.S. and Canada), (Note: ISNA (Islamic Society of North America), ICNA (Islamic Circle of North America), and; MANA (Muslim Alliance of North America), allow individuals to meet others at annual conventions.) and internet matchmaking sites (Note: In the past 10 years, Matchmaking sites for Muslims have become an increasingly popular way to meet one's spouse.: SingleMuslim.com is one of the first matchmaking sites for Muslims, and is very successful. Adeem Younis, the founder of the website, designed it in accordance with Islamic principles. Halal sites like SingleMuslim.com ask questions about individuals’ piety including prayer habits, fasting, and if they have made the hajj pilgrimage. Among Islamic theological figures there is some dispute over the validity of these websites; however, these sites continue to be created and avidly used. According to Younis, “Because ‘dating’ is not allowed in Islam, the Internet is an ideal vehicle for a discreet first step in finding a marriage partner."; Other websites such as, The International Muslim Matrimonial site , broaden the depth of choices for individuals looking for a partner. Individual interests like, hobbies, political views, passions, activities, and family values, are all included to make a user profile. In some societies in both the Islamic world and the West, traditional matchmaking practices do not necessarily include this kind of expression of personal characteristics; therefore, these websites expand individuality while maintaining traditional Islamic ideals of matchmaking.; For Muslims who prefer to avoid dating and interacting with the opposite gender due to halal concerns, the following websites are available: Pure Muslim Match , Sunnah Match , Pure Matrimony , Half our Deen , My Salafi Spouse , and; Zawj-Me .) which provide assistance.

== Diversity by country/region ==
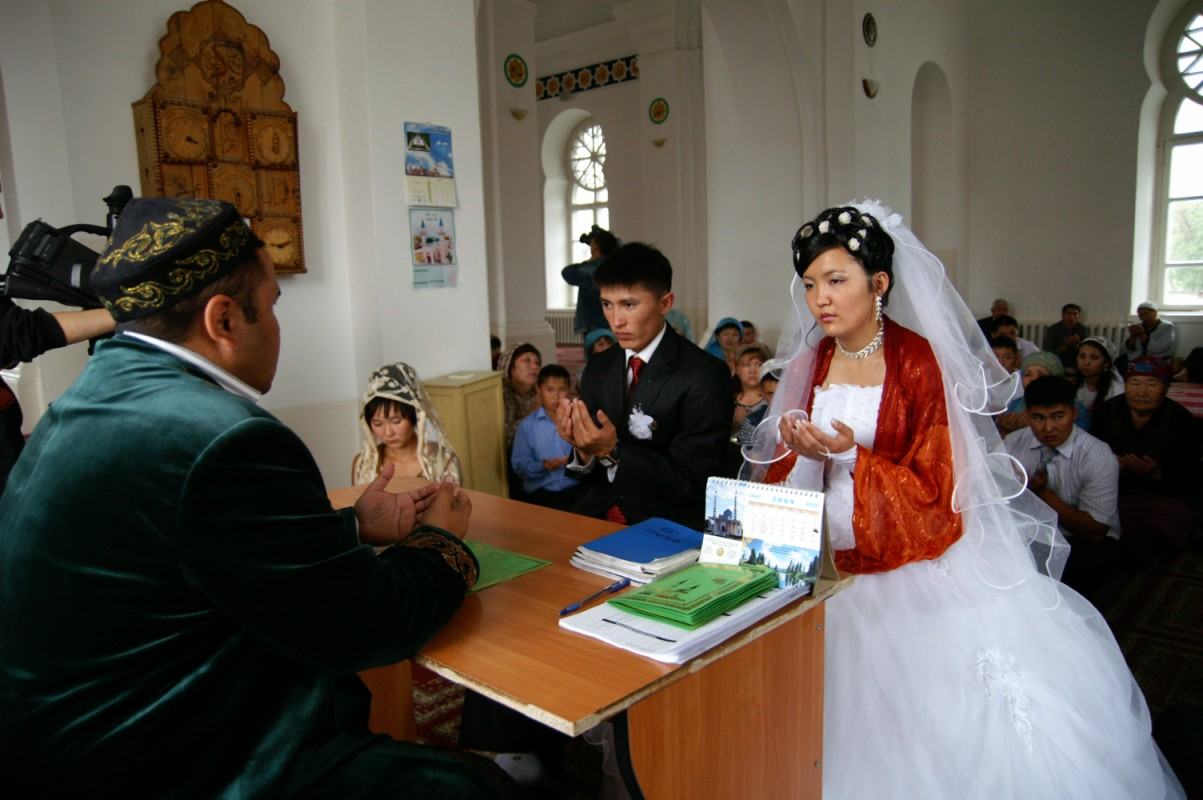
A Kazakh wedding ceremony in a mosque

Among the two billions Muslims and 49 Muslim majority countries in the Muslim world there are many regional and cultural differences. There has also been a mixing of family traditions with those of the host countries among many Muslims living in the West.

However, in addition to the piety shown and fiqh-approved practices in most Muslim weddings and marriages, some jahiliyya practices remain and some non-Muslim practices have crept in (belly dancing, bride kidnapping, music, extravagance).

=== United Arab Emirates ===
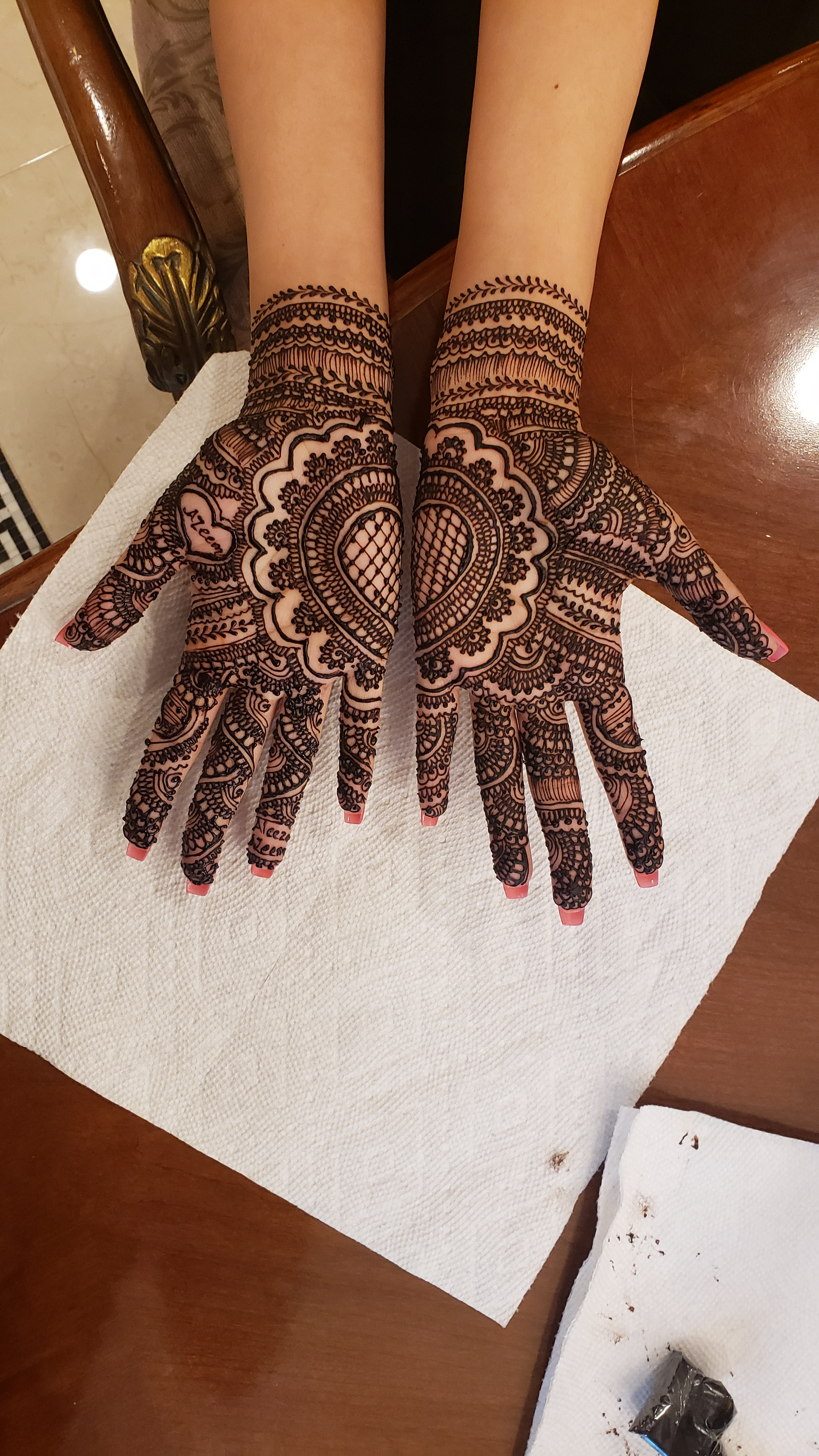
A bride's hand decorated with henna

Wedding ceremonies in the United Arab Emirates traditionally involve scheduling the wedding date, preparation for the bride and groom, and carousing with dancing and singing which takes place one week or less prior to the wedding night. Bridal preparation is done by women by anointing the body of the bride with oil, application of perfumes to the bride's hair, use of creams, feeding the bride with special dishes, washing the bride's hair with amber and jasmine extracts, use of the Arabian Kohl or Arabian eye liner, and decorating the hands and feet with henna, a ritual known as the Laylat Al Henna or “henna night” or "night of henna". Henna decoration is performed a few days before the wedding ceremony; during this evening, other members of the bride's family and guests also place henna over their own hands.

The Emirati bride stays at her dwelling for forty days until the marriage night, only to be visited by her family. Later, the groom offers her items that she will use to create the Addahbia, a dowry which is composed of jewelry, perfumes, and silk, among others, (according to one wedding planning site).

In Dubai, the largest of the seven emirates of the UAE, the traditions of the Bedouin wedding go back to the earliest Arab concept of matrimony, and emphasize marriage as a union of the two families. Traditionally lasting for seven days, Bedouin marriage preparations and celebration start with the marriage proposal known as the Al Khoutha, where the father of the groom-to-be asks the father of the bride-to-be for his daughter's hand in marriage to his son; customarily over cups of minty Arab tea.

If the questioned father shows interest, the families proceed negotiating the marriage contract (Al Akhd). The bride goes through the ritual of a “bridal shower” known as Laylat Al Henna, the henna tattooing of the bride's hands and feet, a service signifying attractiveness, fortune, and healthiness. This is followed by Al Aadaa, a groom-teasing rite done by the friends of the bride wherein they ask compensation after embellishing the bride with henna. The ceremonial also involves a family procession towards the bride's home, a re-enactment of a war dance known as Al Ardha, and the Zaahbaah or the displaying of the bride's garments and the gifts she received from her groom's family. In the earliest versions of Bedouin wedding ceremonies, the groom and the bride live in a tent made of camel hair, the bride staying out of public view during the nuptial proceedings. The wedding concludes with the Tarwaah, when the bride rides a camel towards her new home to live with her husband. After a week, the bride will have a reunion with her own family. Customarily, the groom will not be able to join his bride until after the formal wedding procedure when they arrive at their post-wedding dwelling.

Established Bedouin wedding customs also entail the use of hand-embroidered costumes, the dowry, and the bridewealth.

=== Egypt ===
In Egypt, the largest Arab country and approximately 95% Muslim, many contemporary marriages are based on the bride and groom falling in love, but the couple's family is still involved in arranging the union.

An Egyptian Muslim marriage will often start with the groom asking for the blessing/approval of his proposal to marry from the family of the bride-to-be. If they accept, he will publicly declare the engagement, a process called Je Peniot.

Payment to the bride-to-be and her family will then be negotiated. There are two kinds of traditional Egyptian marriage payment to the bride-to-be from the groom-to-be—the mahr and/or shabka. The mahr, or dower, goes to the bride-to-be's family. The shabka, which is a gift of gold and precious gems, goes to the bride herself. Typically the groom gives both kind of gifts.

Egyptian couples often have engagement parties thrown for them, with families and close friends from both sides in attendance. They are often more extravagant than an equivalent parties in the West, having elaborate decor, entertainment and even a feast where the shabka gift is presented to the bride. The bride's family may host it in her home, a hotel or a fancy restaurant. Even when the marriage is all but signed, the bride and groom are not allowed to meet alone without a chaperone.

Egyptian couples often wear rings to symbolize engagement and marriage, but usually only one, and a simple gold or silver ring, not diamond. Couples will wear the one ring on their right hand when engaged and then during the wedding ceremony move it to the left hand.

A day or two before the wedding, the henna party is held, called the laylat al-hinna, ("night of henna party"), if it is at night. It is equivalent to a bachelorette party and one of the "most" important Egyptian wedding traditions. The bride is often carried into the bathhouse on a canopy wearing a red shawl and a cap or a crown on her head, or a pink dress, made of cotton or silk. The women all gather to decorate the hands and feet of the bride with intricate, traditional henna designs. There is much singing and dancing throughout the night. This tradition is thought to date to Jahiliyyah times, in fact back thousands of years.

The traditional Egyptian wedding ceremony usually occurs in either a marriage hall, the local mosque, or the family home. The officiant is called a maa’zoun. During the ceremony itself, brides typically wear a white wedding dress or a jewel-toned dress with a veil as a symbol of modesty. Traditionally the groom will dress in a ceremonial tribal costume. Guests typically wear something formal or semi-formal.

The wedding ceremony usually begins with the bride and groom's arrival at the venue. When the ceremony is over, the bride's father places the bride and groom's hands together and puts a white cloth over them, and the couple then repeat the words of the Maa’zoun.

After the ceremony, around 10 pm or so, the wedding procession (zaffa) moves to the wedding reception, which often takes place at a local hotel. Wedding guests will have decorated their cars with ribbons and other decorations on display outside the venue. The bride arrives at the reception (kosha) with her father, the waiting groom will remove her veil and kisses her on the cheek or forehead. Events at the reception will include welcoming of the guests by the newlyweds, taking of photographs, belly dancing (weddings are alleged to be "hardly complete" without a belly-dancer), (Note: Despite being disapproved of by clergy, belly dancers are quite popular: "... weddings are hardly complete without a belly-dancer ... Costing the family of the bride or groom up to $3000 for a 45-minute performance and widely considered the highlight of the matrimonial event, the belly-dancer's entrance is anticipated with baited[sic] breath. ... Some time past the witching hour, often draped in a sort of a sparkling cape, she shimmies into the room with a manic enthusiasm, heralded and accompanied by the wild beating of drums.") drumming. and singing to entertain the guests, later a candelabra dance, and the cutting of the wedding cake and feeding of each other by the bride and groom. When the reception is over, often in the early morning hours, the new couple will leave for the groom's house.

In rural areas, Egyptian marriage traditions include a colorful procession where the bride often travels by camel, accompanied by her wedding party. They will dance and sing along the route. It's not uncommon for the women to express their joy through zaghareet (ululation).

=== Post Revolutionary Tunisia ===
In the wake of the Arab Spring urfi (unregistered) marriages reportedly spread in Tunisia (99% Sunni Muslim). Hitherto confined to the poorer sectors of Tunisian society, they appeared on university campuses (such as the Manouba University in northeastern Tunisia), thanks to the unrest of the revolution and the influence of Salafi preachers and activists, according to a 2012 report by France24. The marriages gave religious sanction to the fulfillment of sexual urges of the young people, while circumventing the high costs of traditional rituals and ceremonies that come with state sanctioned marriage, and that the students could not afford. The marriages were (at least) often kept secret from families and have been criticized by feminists for leaving urfi wives vulnerable if they were abandoned by her husband as the marriages lack legal sanction.

=== Nigerian elite ===
As of 2024 ostentatious practices at odds with the Islamic principles of "decency, modesty and peaceful coexistence", were being flaunted at weddings of the Nigerian elite, according to a journal paper authored by Sherifat Hussain-Abubakar. There are outrageous outfits and venue, arbitrary seat arrangement and feeding of guests, daunting dances and music, ... humorous games and speeches," events sometimes lasting "weeks". "Inserted" into the wedding celebration among the elite in "the name of modernity" were not just western practices such as wedding cakes and rings, but "a pre-wedding Photo Shoot, Bridal Shower, Bachelor’s Party, Mother’s Day, After-party, etc.". The traditional wedding banquet has become overshadowed by a new "wedding reception", with "pricey and questionable activities"; one such activity being requiring guests to wear "specific" uniforms, known as a Aso Ebi, sometimes costing as much as $1000, as the price of entrance to the wedding reception. These can become a burden to most in a poor country. Hussain-Abubakar concludes that particularly objectionable at some receptions have been "women’s provocative appearances, outrageous mingling of the opposite sex in sitting arrangement and dances, improper and amorous utterances from reception artists", and the ignoring of salat prayer.

=== Kyrgyzstan ===
Wedding customs in Kyrgyzstan (90% Muslim but a former Soviet Republic where Islam had been suppressed for decades), include the ‘elechek’, a traditional Kyrgyz headdress for brides signifying the transition from girl to married woman; food dishes such as the noodle dish ‘Beshbarmak’, and meat and onion dish ‘Kuurdak’. But a hallmark of a Kyrgyzstan wedding and an ancient custom is the “Ala Kachuu” or “bride kidnapping”. These days it is usually symbolic and a just colorful procession, but unfortunately, "widely practiced" (at least before 2013), in its literal form according to a study of marriage in that country in the post-Soviet era. A resurgence in abduction of woman to be made brides has been part of a post-Soviet “return to tradition” sometimes encouraged by Kyrgyz nationalists, serious enough for some members of the abducted bride's family to have been murdered, and for activism against it to become a "public movement of significant size and visibility".

=== Indian subcontinent ===
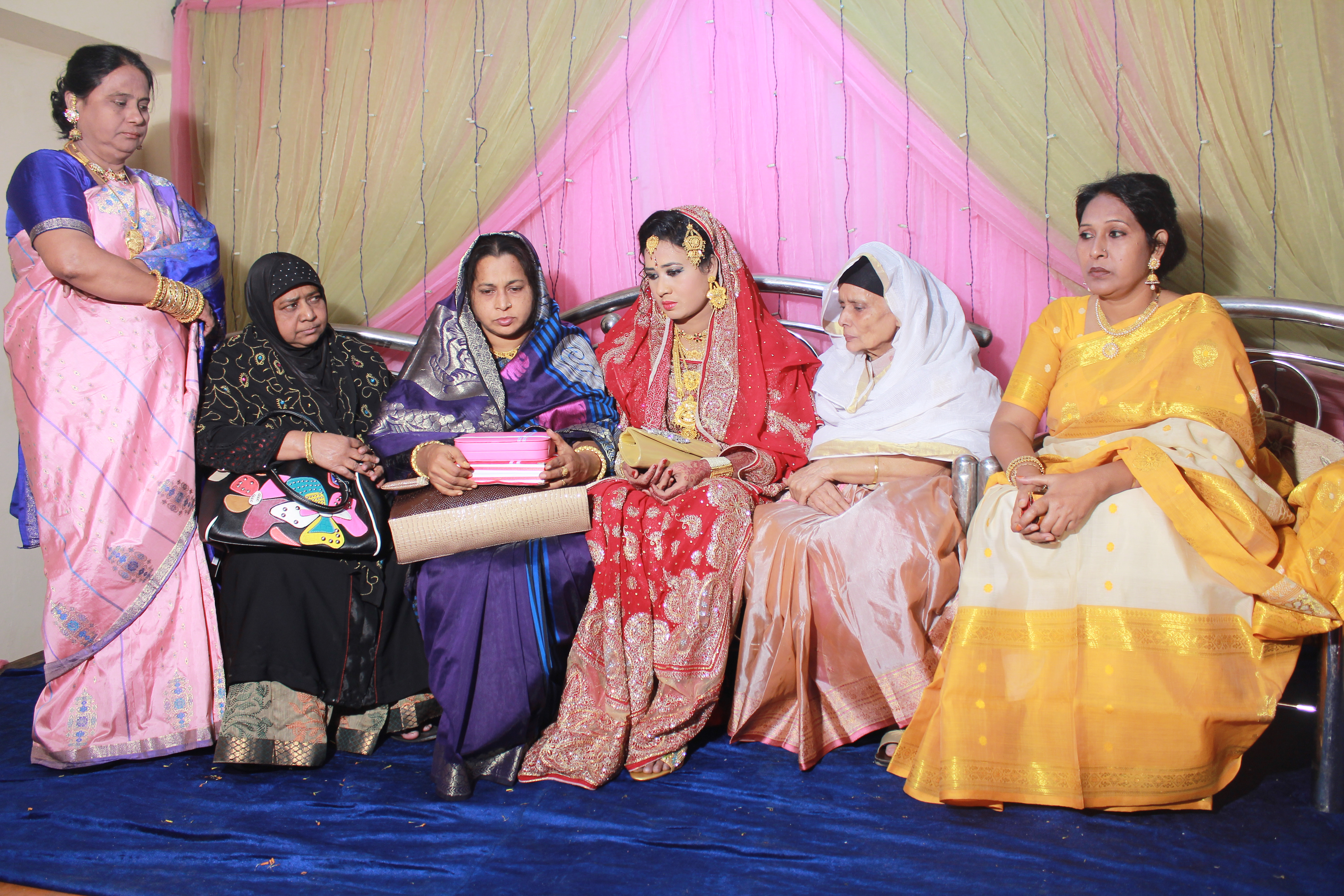
A Bengali Muslim bride with her family.

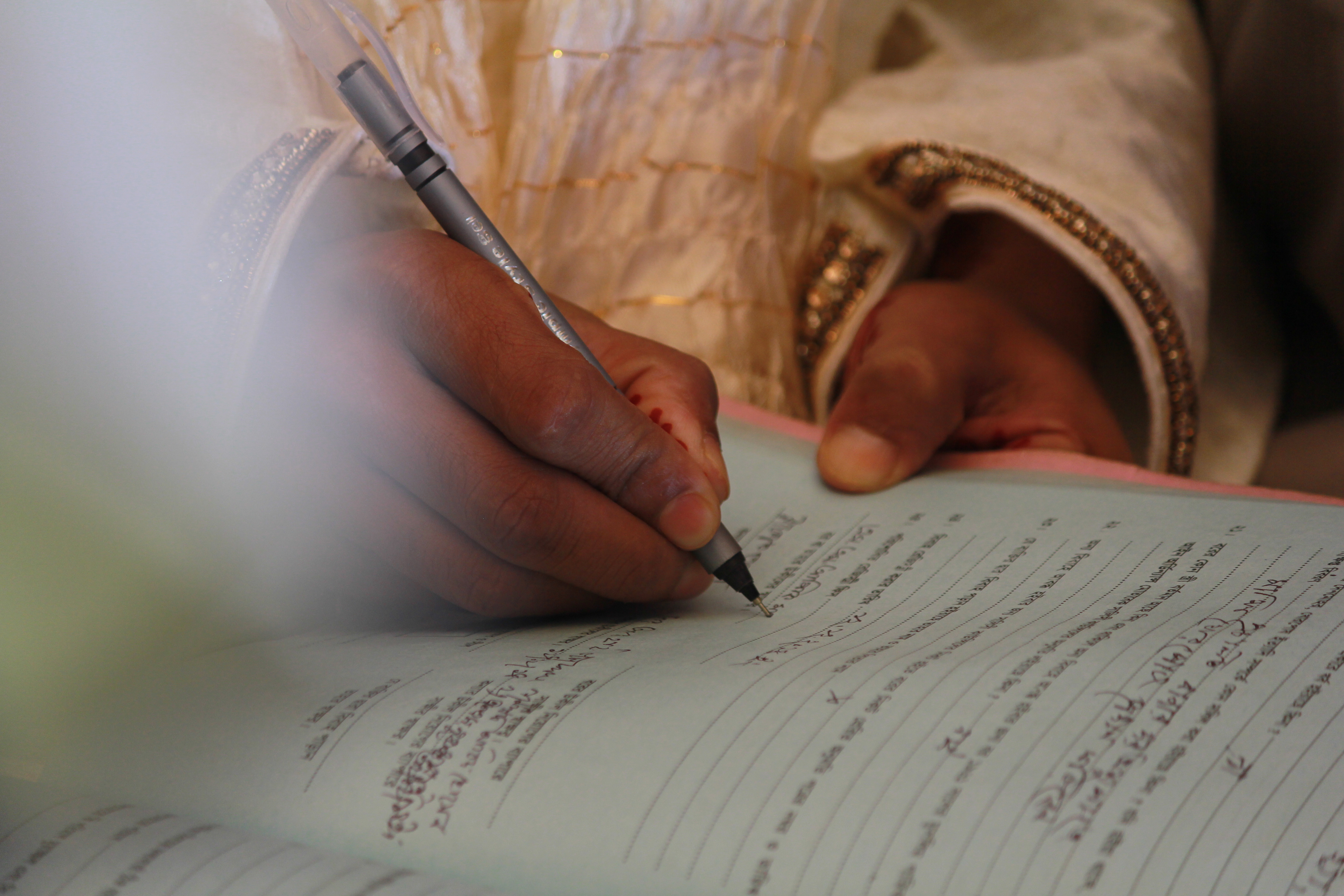
Groom signing the marriage documents in Bangladesh

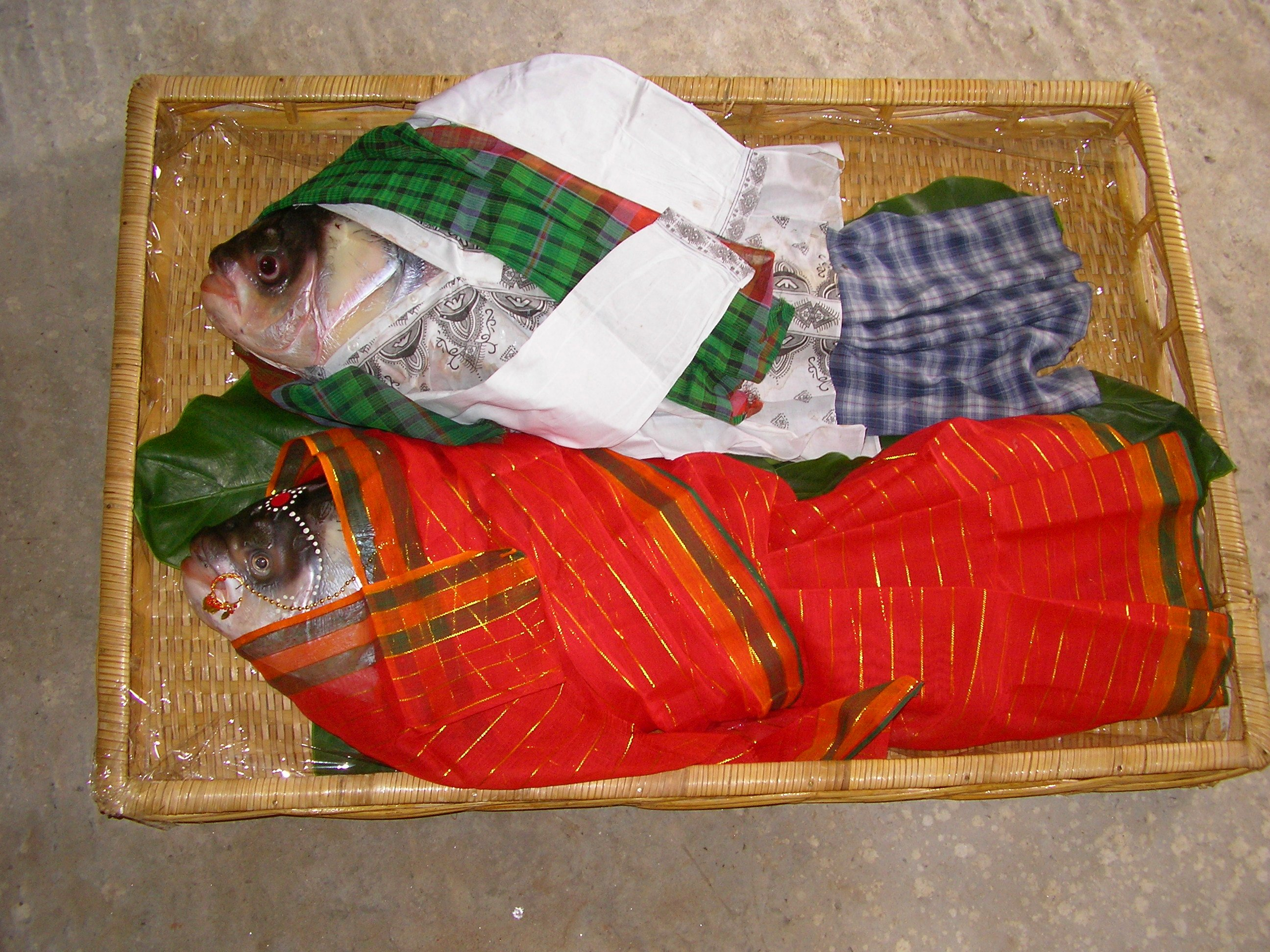
A pair of fish is given to the bride by the groom's family as a gift of Gaye Holud in Bangladeshi weddings.

Muslims in the Indian subcontinent normally follow marriage customs similar to those practiced by Muslims of the Middle East, which are based on Islamic convention. The marriage ceremonies of Sunnis and other Islamic traditions were first handed down to medieval Indians by propagators of the Islamic religion that involved sultans and Moghul rulers at the time. (Note: In the state of India, laws applicable to Muslims (except in the state of Goa which has a Uniform Civil Code, i.e. same law irrespective of religion, caste or nationality) regarding matters of marriage, succession, Inheritance etc. are: 1. Muslim Personal Law Sharia Application Act,1937; 2. The Dissolution Of Muslim Marriages Act, 1939; 3. Muslim Women's Protection of Rights on Divorce Act,1986; The Muslim Personal Law Sharia Application Act of 1937, makes polygamy legal for Muslims: a Muslim man may marry a maximum of four women at a time without divorce and with few conditions.)

Before the wedding the bride's and groom's families make a decision regarding the price of the Mehar (the matrimonial financial endowment given by the groom's family to the bride that should be no less than ten dirhams). Traditional Muslim Indian wedding celebrations typically last for three days. Prior to the observance of the wedding ceremony proper, there are two separate pre-wedding rituals—one at the groom's house and one at the bride's home. Both involve traditional dancing and singing.

On the eve of the wedding day, a bridal service known as the Mehndi ritual or henna ceremony is held at the bride's home. This ritual is sometimes done two days before the actual wedding day. During this bridal preparation ritual, turmeric paste is placed on the bride's skin for the purpose of improving and brightening her complexion (something disapproved of by scholars because it is similar to the non-Muslim Hindu Graha Shanti / Pithi), after which mehndi is applied on the bride's hands and feet by the mehndiwali, a female relative.

A practice that used to be part of Islamic wedding rituals in India but has been abandoned, is the anointing of teeth with a powder called 'missī' in order to blacken them.

The wedding ceremony, known as Nikah, is officiated by the Maulvi or Qazi, a religious official. Among the important wedding participants are the Walises, who are the fathers of both groom and bride, (the bride's father is also her legal representative). It is the bride's father who promises his daughter's hand to the groom, a ritual known as the Kanya-dhan. Men and women are typically seated separately for this formal occasion, particularly in conventional Islamic weddings. Common sequences of the wedding ceremony include

- the reading of Quranic verses,
- the groom's proposal and bride's acceptance, known as the Ijab-e-Qubul, or the ijab and qabul;
- signing of the marriage contract—known as the Nikaahnama—not only by the couple but also by the Walises and the Maulvi;
- blessings and prayers given by older women and other guests to the couple;
- in return the groom gives salutatory salaam wishes to his blessers, especially to female elders.
- the bride also usually receives gifts known generally as the burri, which may be in the form of gold jewelries, garments, money, and the like.

After the Nikah, the now married couple joins each other to be seated among gender-segregated attendees. The groom is customarily brought first to the women's area in order for him to be able to present gifts to his wife's sister. Although jointly seated, the bride and the groom can only observe one another via mirrors, and a copy of the Quran is placed in between their assigned seats. With their heads sheltered by a dupatta and while guided by the Maulvi, the couple reads Muslim prayers.

After the wedding ceremony, the bride is brought to the house of her husband, where she is welcomed by her mother-in-law, who holds a copy of the Quran over her head.

The wedding reception hosted by the groom family is known as the Valimah or the Dawat-e-walima.

=== China ===
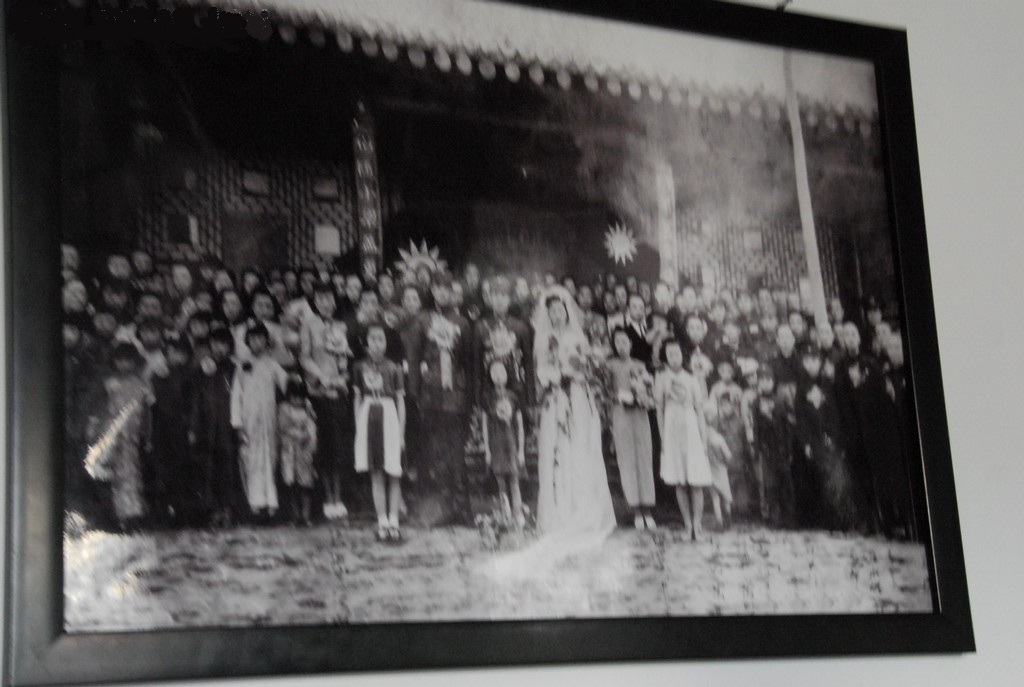
Muslim General Ma Jiyuan's wedding with a Kuomintang flag in the background

Prominent Muslims in China, such as generals, followed standard marriage practices in the 20th century, such as using western clothing like white wedding dresses.

Chinese Muslim marriages resemble typical Chinese marriages except traditional Chinese religious rituals are not used.

==== Xinjiang ====
In March 2017, Salamet Memetimin, an ethnic Uyghur and the Communist Party secretary for Chaka township's Bekchan village in Qira County, Hotan Prefecture, Xinjiang, China, was relieved of her duties for taking her nikah marriage vows at her home. In interviews with Radio Free Asia in 2020, residents and officials of Shufu County (Kona Sheher), Kashgar Prefecture (Kashi) stated that it was no longer possible to perform traditional Uyghur nikah marriage rites in the country.

=== The Malay Archipelago ===
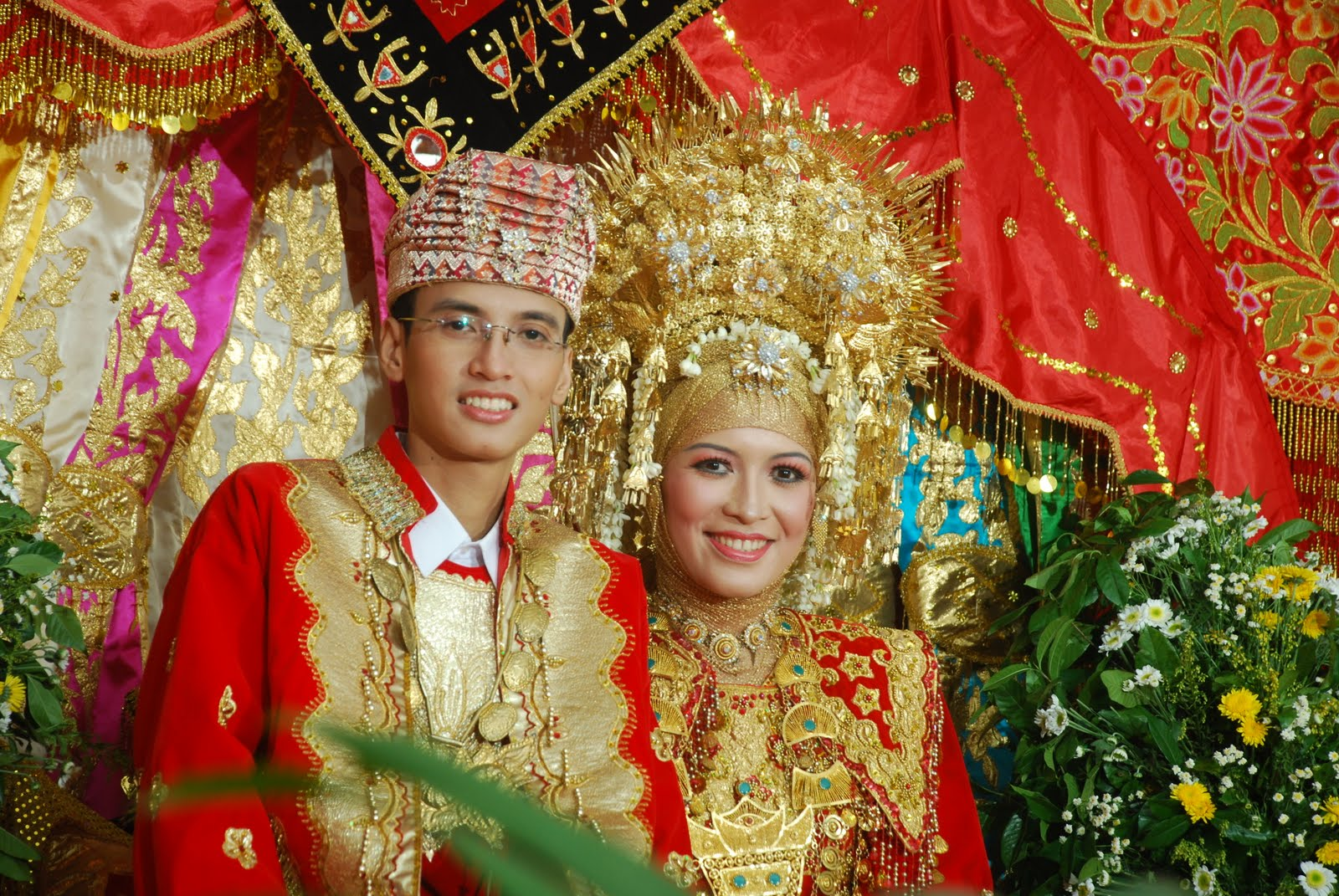
A Minangkabau wedding ceremony in Indonesia. In a traditional Minangkabau wedding, the bride and groom sit together in a traditional wedding lounge known as the pelaminan throughout the celebration.

Malay wedding traditions (Malay: Adat Perkahwinan Melayu; Jawi script: عادة ڤركهوينن ملايو), such as those that occur in Brunei, Singapore, Malaysia, and parts of Indonesia and Thailand, normally include

- the lamaran or marriage proposal,
- the betrothal,
- the determination of the bridal dowry known as the hantaran agreed upon by both the parents’ of the groom and the bride (usually done one year before the solemnization of marriage),
- delivery of gifts and the dowry (istiadat hantar belanja),
- the marriage solemnization (upacara akad nikah) at the bride's home or in a mosque,
- the henna application ritual known as the berinai,
- the costume changing of the couple known as the tukar pakaian for photography sessions,
- followed by wedding reception,
- a feast-meal for guests (pesta pernikahan or resepsi pernikahan) usually took place in the weekend (Saturday or Sunday), and
- the bersanding or the sitting-in-state ceremony when the couple sit in elaborate pelaminan (wedding throne) at their own home, or in wedding hall during the wedding reception.

Prior to being able to meet his bride, sometimes a mak andam, a “beautician”, or any member of the family of the bride will intercept the groom to delay the joining of the would-be spouses; only after the groom was able to pay a satisfactory “entrance fee” could he finally meet his bride. The wedding ceremony proper is usually held on a weekend, and involves exchanging of gifts, Quranic readings and recitation, and displaying of the couple while within a bridal chamber. While seated at their pelaminan “wedding throne”, the newly-weds are showered with uncooked rice and petals, objects that signify fertility. The guests of the wedding celebration are typically provided by the couple with gifts known as the bunga telur (“egg flower”). The gifted eggs are traditionally eggs dyed with red coloring and are placed inside cups or other suitable containers bottomed with glutinous rice. These eggs also symbolize fertility, a marital wish hoping that the couple will bear many offspring. However, these traditional gifts are now sometimes replaced by non-traditional chocolates, jellies, or soaps.

The marriage contract that binds the marital union is called the Akad Nikah, a verbal agreement sealed by a financial sum known as the mas kahwin, and witnessed by three persons. Unlike in the past when the father of the bride customarily acts as the officiant for the ceremonial union, current-day Muslim weddings are now officiated by the kadhi, a marriage official and Shariat (or) Syariah Court religious officer. In Indonesia, Muslim weddings are officiated and led by the penghulu, the official of Kantor Urusan Agama (KUA or Office of Religious Affairs). The Akad Nikah might be performed in the Office of Religious Affairs, or the penghulu is invited to a ceremonial place outside the Religious Affair Office (mosque, bride's house or wedding hall).

=== Jolo, Philippines ===
Muslim communities in the Philippines include the Tausug and T'boli tribe, a group of people in Jolo, Sulu (an island in Southern Philippines) who practice matrimonial activities based on their own ethnic legislation and the laws of Islam. Their customary and legal matrimony is composed of negotiated arranged marriage (pagpangasawa), marriage through the “game of abduction” (pagsaggau), and elopement (pagdakup). Furthermore, although Tausug men may acquire two wives, bigamous or plural marriages are rare.

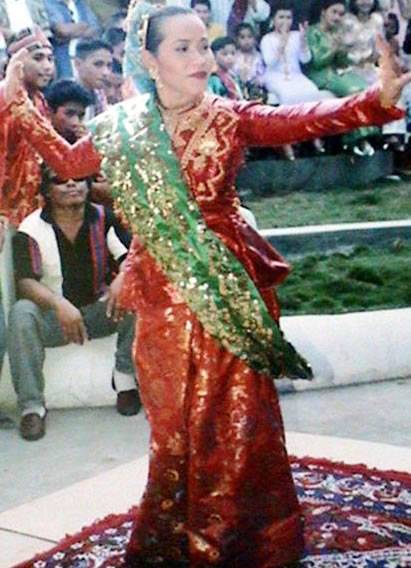
A Filipino Tausug woman performing the traditional pangalay dance

Tausug matrimonial customs generally include:

- the negotiation and proclamation of the bridewealth (the ungsud) which is a composition of the “valuables for the offspring” or dalaham pagapusan (in the form of money or an animal that cannot be slaughtered for the marital feast);
- the "valuables dropped in the ocean" or dalaham hug a tawid, which are intended for the father of the bride; the basingan which is a payment – in the form of antique gold or silver Spanish or American coins – for the transference of kingship rights toward the usba or “male side”;
- the “payment to the treasury” (sikawin baytal-mal, a payment to officers of the law and wedding officiants);
- the wedding musicians and performers; wedding feast costs;
- and the guiding proverb that says a lad should marry by the time he has already personally farmed for a period of three years. This is the reason why young Tausug males and females typically marry a few years after they reached the stage of puberty.

Regular arranged Islamic marriages through negotiation are typically according to parental wishes, although sometimes the son will also suggest a woman of his choice. This is the ideal, esteemed, and considered “most proper” in the legal point of view of Tausug culture, despite being a time-consuming and costly practice for the groom. If the parents disagree with their son's choice of a woman to marry, he might decide to resort to a marriage by abducting the woman of his choice, run away, run amuck, or choose to become an outlaw. In relation to this type of marriage, another trait that is considered ideal in Tausug marriage is to wed sons and daughters with first or second cousins, due to the absence of difficulty in negotiating and simplification of land inheritance discussions. However, there is also another way of arranging a Tausug marriage, which is through the establishment of maglillah pa maas sing babai or by “surrendering to the lady’s parents”, wherein the lad proclaims his intention while at the house of the parents of the woman of his choice; he will not depart until he receives permission to marry. In other circumstances, the lad offers a sum of money to the parents of the lass; a refusal by the father and mother of the woman would mean paying a fine or doubling the price offered by the negotiating man.

“Abduction-game marriages” are characteristically in accord with the grooms’ requests, and are performed either by force or “legal fiction”. This strategy of marrying a woman is actually a “courtship game” that expresses a Tausug man's masculinity and bravery. Although the woman has the right to refuse marrying her “abductor”, reluctance and refusal does not always endure because the man will resort to seducing the “abductee”. In the case of marriages done through the game of abduction, the bridewealth offered is a gesticulation to appease the woman's parents.

Elopements are normally based on the brides’ desires, which may, at times, are made to resemble a “bride kidnapping” situation (i.e. a marriage through the game of abduction) in order to prevent dishonoring the woman who wished to be eloped. One way of eloping is known to the Tausugs as muuy magbana or the "homecoming to get hold of a husband", wherein a Tausug woman offers herself to the man of her choice or to the parents of the man who she wants to become her spouse. Elopement is also a strategy used by female Tausugs in order to be able to enter into a second marriage, or done by an older unwed lady by seducing a man who is younger than her.

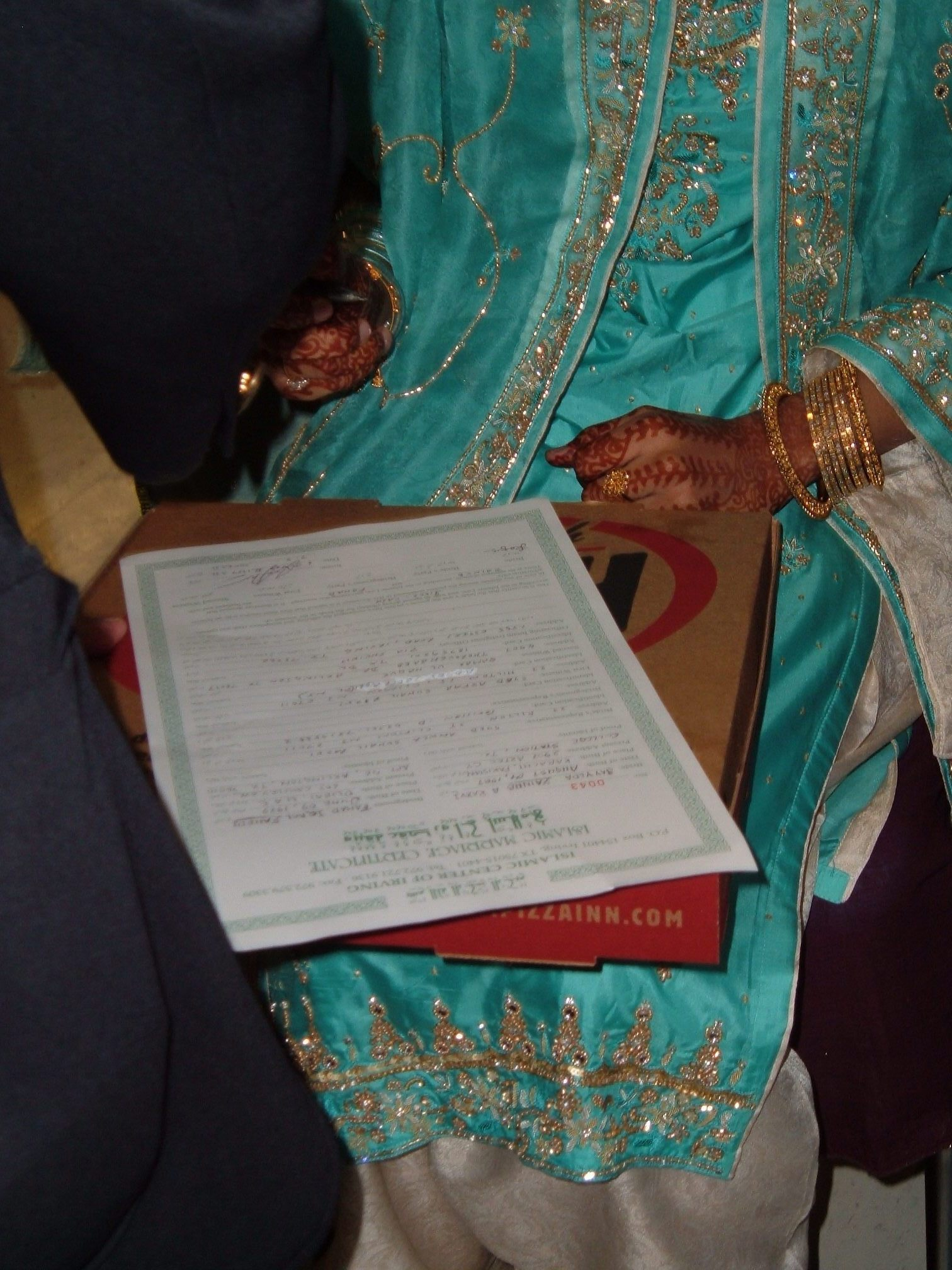
Signing the Nikah

During the engagement period, the man may render service to his bride's parents in the form of performing household chores. After the period of engagement has lapsed, the marital-union ceremony is observed by feastings, delivery of the whole bridewealth, slaughtering of a carabao or a cow, playing gongs and native xylophones, reciting prayers in the Arabic and Tausug languages, symbolic touching by the groom of his bride's forehead, and the couple's emotionless sitting-together ritual. In some instances when a groom is marrying a young bride, the engagement period may last longer until the Tausug lass has reached the right age to marry; or the matrimonial ceremony may proceed – a wedding the Tausug termed as “to marry in a handkerchief” or kawin ha saputangan – because the newly-wed man can live after marriage at the home of his parents-in-law but cannot have marital sex with his wife until she reaches the legal age.

Tausug culture also allows the practice of divorce.

There are also other courtship, marriage, and wedding customs in the Philippines.

=== United States ===
Muslims in the United States come from many backgrounds, but the largest segment are those from South Asia, Arab countries, and more recently from East Africa. According to a 2012 study, 95% of Muslim American couples interviewed had completed both the Nikah and had obtained a civil marriage license, which is required to have a marriage legally recognized in the United States.

When it comes to Muslim weddings, the culture they come from heavily influences the kind of rituals that will take place. Similarly, American Muslims (e.g. African Americans, Caucasians, Hispanics and others) have elements of both local and Muslim influence.

The central event in all American Muslim weddings is the Nikah. This is the actual wedding ceremony, usually officiated by a Muslim cleric, an Imam. Although a Nikah can be done anywhere including the bride's home or reception hall, it is preferable and usually done in a mosque.

A Muslim Wedding Survey of North American Muslims, revealed among other things the merger of two or more cultures. For example, the two most popular wedding dress colors are red and white. Whereas in traditional Muslim countries marriages have been arranged, in the United States, 57.75% of weddings are through friends, online or people the person has met at work.

== Gallery ==
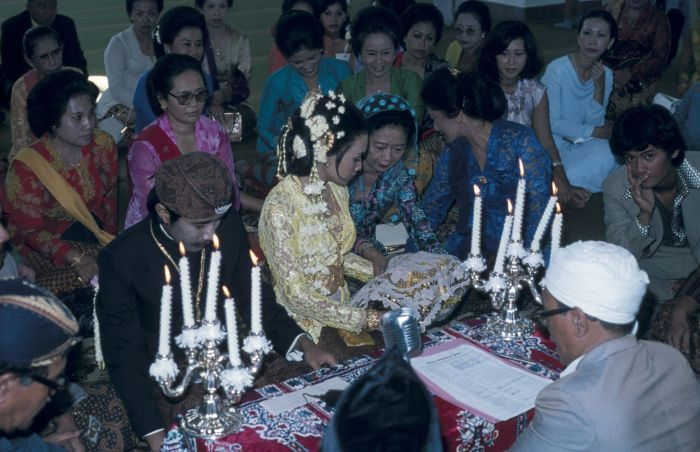
A Sundanese wedding ceremony held inside a mosque in West Java, Indonesia in 1977

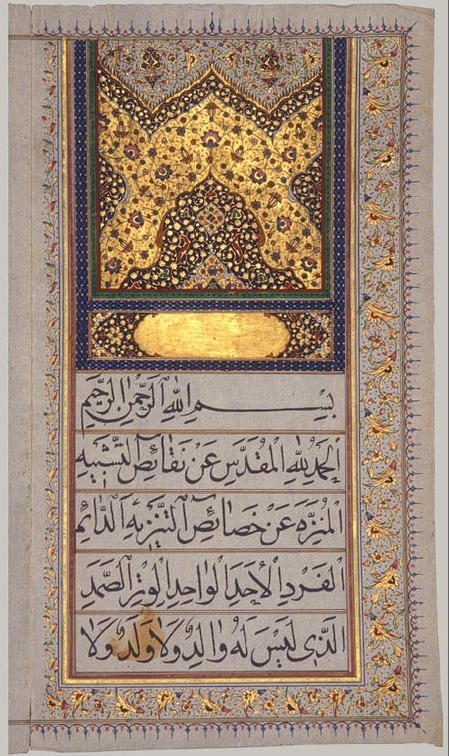
An 1874 Islamic marriage contract

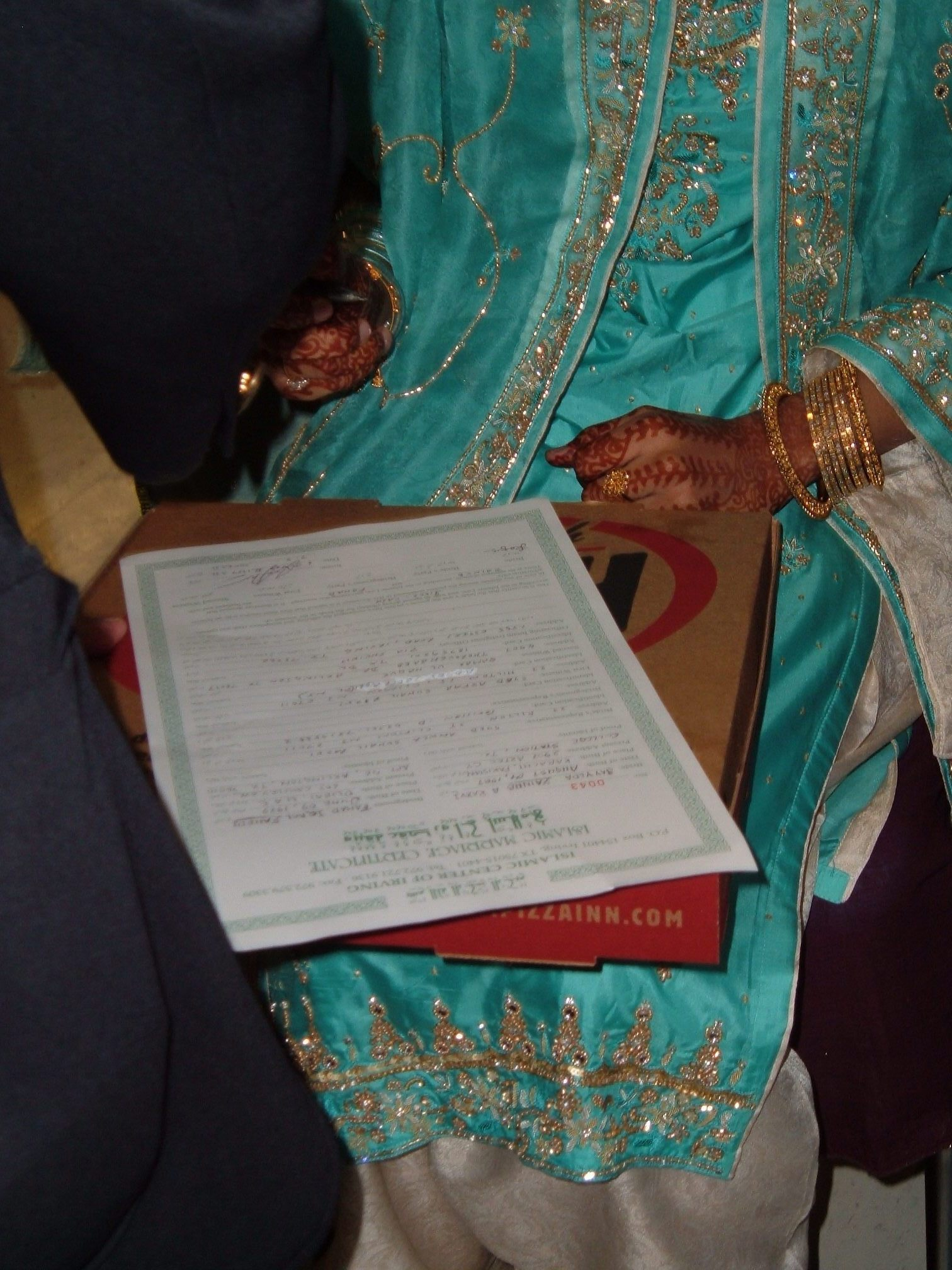
A bride signing the nikah nama (marriage contract)

== See also ==
- Marriage in Islam
- Islamic marriage contract
- Islamic marital jurisprudence
- Misyar marriage
- Nikah mut'ah
- Minangkabau marriage — West Sumatra, Indonesia
- Bengali Muslim wedding
- Pakistani wedding
- Persian marriage
- Punjabi wedding traditions
- Special Marriage Act, 1954 — India
- Salat al-Istikharah
