= Marriage in Islam =

Islamic concept of marriage

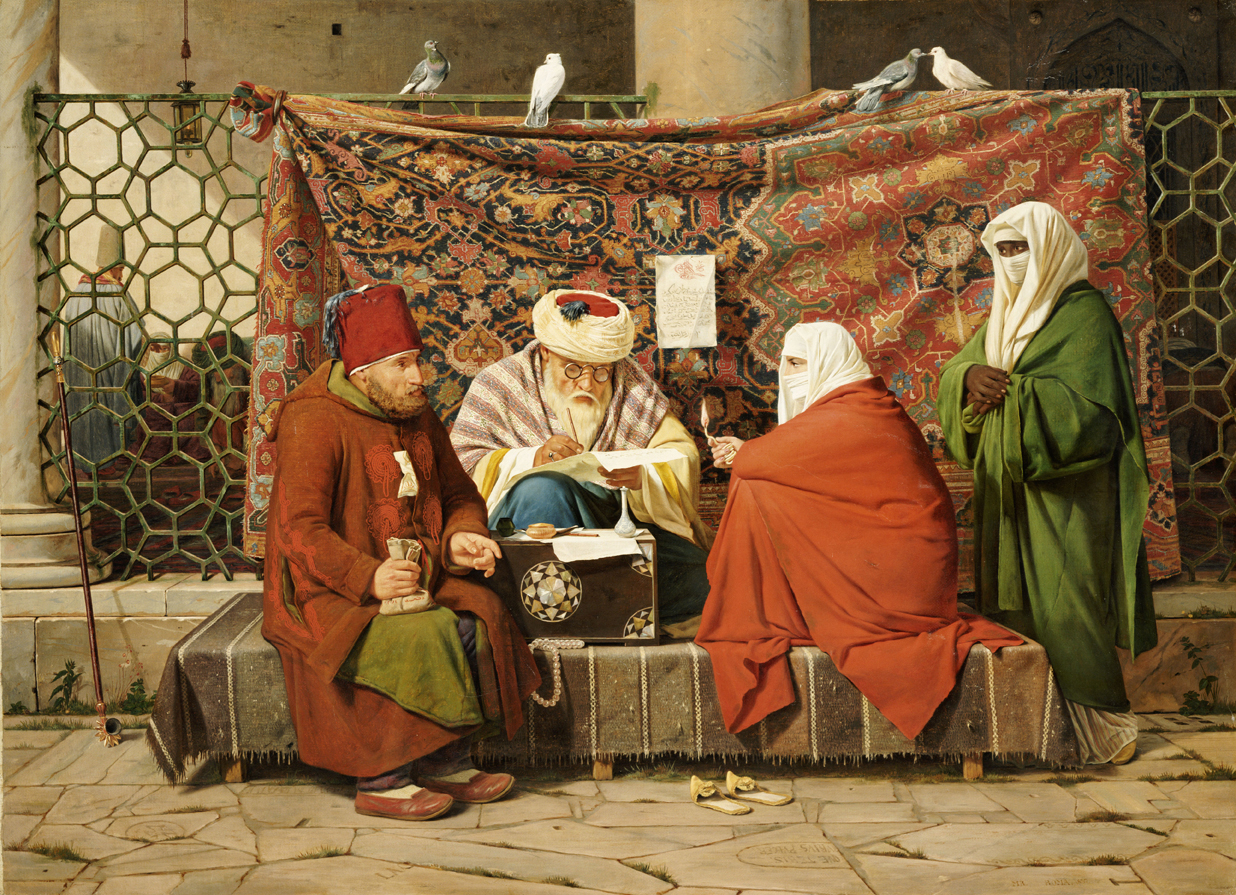
A Turkish notary drawing up a marriage contract in front of the Kiliç Ali Pasha Mosque, Tophane, Constantinople by Martinus Rørbye, 1837

In Islamic law, marriage centers around nikah (Arabic: نِكَاح, romanized: nikāḥ), which is the marriage contract (also known as ʿaqd al-qirān, nikah nama, etc.), or more specifically, the bride's acceptance (qubul) of the groom's dower (mahr); and the witnessing of her acceptance. In addition, there are several other traditional steps such as khitbah (preliminary meeting(s) to get to know the other party and negotiate terms), walimah (marriage feast) and zifaf/rukhsati ("sending off" of bride and groom).

In addition to the requirement that a formal, binding contract – either oral or on paper – of rights and obligations for both parties be drawn up, there are a number of other rules for marriage in Islam: among them that there be witnesses to the marriage, a gift from the groom to the bride known as a mahr, that both the groom and the bride freely consent to the marriage; that the groom can be married to more than one woman (a practice known as polygyny) but no more than four, that the women can be married to no more than one man, developed (according to Islamic sources) from the Quran, (the holy book of Islam) and hadith (the passed down saying and doings of the Islamic prophet Muhammad). Divorce is permitted in Islam and can take a variety of forms, some executed by a husband personally and some executed by a religious court on behalf of a plaintiff wife who is successful in her legal divorce petition for valid cause.

In addition to the usual marriage intended for raising families, the Twelver branch of Shia Islam permits zawāj al-mut'ah or "temporary", fixed-term marriage; and some Sunni Islamic scholars permit nikah misyar marriage, which lacks some conditions such as living together. A nikah 'urfi, "customary" marriage, is one not officially registered with state authorities.

Traditional marriage in Islam has been criticized (by modernist Muslims) and defended (by traditionalist Muslims) for allowing polygamy and easy divorce.

== Terminology ==
In the Hans Wehr Dictionary of Modern Written Arabic, nikah is defined as "marriage; marriage contract; matrimony, wedlock". In the Quran, nikah is used to refer to the contract of marriage. According to at least a couple of sources—Ibrahim B. Syed and the Ahlan Foundation—the Quran also uses "a strong agreement" (Arabic: مِّيثَـٰقًا غَلِيظًۭا, romanized: mithaqun ghalithun), in verse Q.4:21, to refer to marriage. (Note: Ibrahim B. Syed also states, "The Quran also uses the Arabic word "Hisn", suggesting "fortress" for marriage. Marriage is considered the fortress of chastity.") (Note: In some Muslim cultures, such as Pakistan, nikah may not begin married life in the form of consummation and living together, as that event is known as rukhsati. The gap in time between nikah and rukhsati occurs while the prospective wife waits for her prospective husband to get a good job, a home and produce her dower/mahr. But many consider this a cultural and not an Islamic practice.))

In Arabic-speaking countries, marriage is commonly called zawāj (Arabic: زواج, from the Quranic term zawj (Arabic: زوج), referring to a member of a pair), and this term has recently gained currency among Muslim speakers of other languages as well.

The marriage contract is known by different names:

- ʿaqd al-qirān Literary Arabic: عقد القران ʿaqd al-qirān, "matrimony contract";
- Nikāḥ-nāmah Urdu: نکاح نامہ / ALA-LC;
- akd, Bengali: আকদ, romanized: akd;
- ezdevāj, Persian: ازدواج ezdevāj "marriage" and سند ازدواج or sǎnǎde ezdevāj عقدنامه aqd nāmeh (sǎnǎde ezdevāj, aqd nāmeh) for the certificate.

The marriage celebration may be called

- ʿurs / zawāj (Arabic: زواج / عرس),
- ezdewaj/arusi (Persian),
- shaadi (Urdu),
- biye/biya (Bengali)
- düğün (Turkish).

== History ==
=== Before Islam ===
In Arabia before the advent of Islam in the 7th century CE, a variety of different marriage practices existed. The most common and recognized types of marriage at this time were marriage by agreement, marriage by capture, marriage by mahr, marriage by inheritance, and mot'a or temporary marriage. In Mesopotamia, marriages were generally monogamous, except among male royalty, who would have harems consisting of wives and concubines. The Sasanian society followed Zoroastrianism, which viewed women to be possessions in marriage, although consent was required in both marriage and divorce.

According to Islamic sources, most women in the pre-7th century Arabia had little control over their marriages and Islam brought a big improvement. They were bound by contract for marriage or custody of children, and their consent was rarely sought. Women were seldom allowed to divorce their husbands, and their view was not regarded for either a marriage or divorce. However, in the transitional age from non-Islamic to Islamic society, elite women could divorce and remarry without stigma. They were given the power to negotiate the terms of their marriage contract and could even initiate divorce.

=== Reforms with Islam ===
During Muhammad's prophethood several chapters and verses from the Quran were revealed which banned common marriage practices that existed prior to that time. The rules of "marriage by agreement (marriage through consent)" were reformed by Muhammad, and strict rules and regulations were set. The practice of "marriage by inheritance" (where a man inherited his father's wives) was forbidden.

Under the Arabian Jahiliyyah (pre-Islamic) law, Islamic sources write that no limitations were set on men's rights to marry or to obtain a divorce. Islamic law limited men to four wives at one time, not including slave concubines. (Quran 4:3) Additionally, a man was required to provide a suitable marriage gift for each wife and ensure financial support and separate housing for all. As a result, only wealthy men could historically afford to practice polygyny. The institution of marriage was refined into one in which the woman was somewhat of an interested partner. 'For example, the dower, previously regarded as a bride-price paid to the father, became a nuptial gift retained by the wife as part of her personal property'. Under Islamic law, marriage was no longer viewed as a "status" but rather as a "contract". The essential elements of the marriage contract were now an offer by the man, an acceptance by the woman, and the performance of such conditions as the payment of dowry. The woman's consent, given either actively or by silence, was required. Furthermore, the offer and acceptance had to be made in the presence of at least two witnesses.

== Encouragement ==
As in many if not all religions, marriage is encouraged in Islam, with the exception if the person(s) are asexual, in which case it would be considered makruh. Lavender marriages where one or both partners are asexual or another non-heterosexual orientation is haram.

- Verses from the Quran, indicate positive feelings towards marriage: "marry those among you who are single ..." (Q.24:32), "...Bless us with ˹pious˺ spouses and offspring who will be the joy of our hearts ..." (Q.25:74), " ...He created for you from yourselves mates that you may find tranquility in them..." (Q.30:21), "The love of the desires for women, sons, ... has been made attractive to people." (Q.3:14) (Note: “And marry those among you who are single and those who are fit among your male slaves and your female slaves;" (Q.24:32); ˹They are˺ those who pray, “Our Lord! Bless us with ˹pious˺ spouses and offspring who will be the joy of our hearts, and make us models for the righteous.”25:74; "And of His signs is that He created for you from yourselves mates that you may find tranquility in them, and He placed between you affection and mercy. (Surah Ar-Rum, 30:21))
- There are hadith calling for Muslims to marry
  - as a religious duty: “When a man marries he has fulfilled half of the religion; ...” (Mishkat al-Masabih), “Marriage is part of my sunnah, and whoever does not follow my sunnah has nothing to do with me"(Sunan Ibn Majah)
  - as part of the religion of the fitrah, "consistent with the natural instincts and needs of mankind", opposing "the monastic life of Christians”, (Al-Bayhaqi); the "unnatural constraints" such as celibacy (Note: (according to Ahmad Bello Dogarawa and Ibrahim B. Syed),)
  - to increase the number of Muslims: “Marry those who are loving and fertile, for I will be proud of your great numbers before the other nations."
  - to fight the temptations of illicit sex (zina, a great sin in Islam), "Whoever among you can marry, should marry, because it helps him lower his gaze and guard his modesty, ....'" (Sahih al-Bukhari), “Whoever has the means, let him get married, and whoever does not, then he should fast for it will diminish his desire" (Sunan Ibn Majah).
- Other revelation are less concerned about lack of money for a mahr, assuring Muslims God will "... will make them free from want ... " (Q.24:32) (Note: “And marry those among you who are single and those who are fit among your male slaves and your female slaves; if they are needy, Allah will make them free from want out of His grace; and Allah is Ample-giving, Knowing.” (Surah an-Nur, 24:32))
- Or that they should marry even if they have few resources: "Marry, even with [a Mahr equal to] an iron ring." (Al-Bukhari)

According to scholars, marriage in Islam provides a structure for the relationship between partners creating a family, and safeguards rights of members of the family (Ahlan Foundation, Ahmad Dogarawa). Marrying within the Muslim community and creating a “productive and constructive" family where members help and encourage one and other to "be good and righteous", helps to preserve the religion (Ahmad Dogarawa).

Family life in Islam, finding a partner to share life's joys and sorrows (Ayatollah Ibrahim Amini), is considered a "blessing", a source of stability, (Note: A BBC page for GCSE WJEC (secondary education) religious studies states, "For Muslims, marriage was created by Allah to provide a foundation for family life and the whole of society.") the foundation for families. By regulating sexual desire marriage prevents it from destabilizing the community, in the eyes of religious scholars of Islamic law. In a patrilineal society, where a person's social status is defined by their father's lineage, marriage was a crucial institution for controlling reproduction and ensuring that children were properly recognized and claimed (Judith E. Tucker).

According to scholars of fiqh, marriage is either obligatory (fard) or preferred (mustahabb) if a man has the means to marry (can afford mahr), and has no fear of mistreating his wife. If a man fears committing unlawful acts (fornication) if he does not marry, marriage then become obligatory; if he does not fear this it is only preferred (Sheikh Sayyed Sabiq).

== Conditions ==
There are several conditions for an Islamic marriage to take place:

=== Marriage contract ===
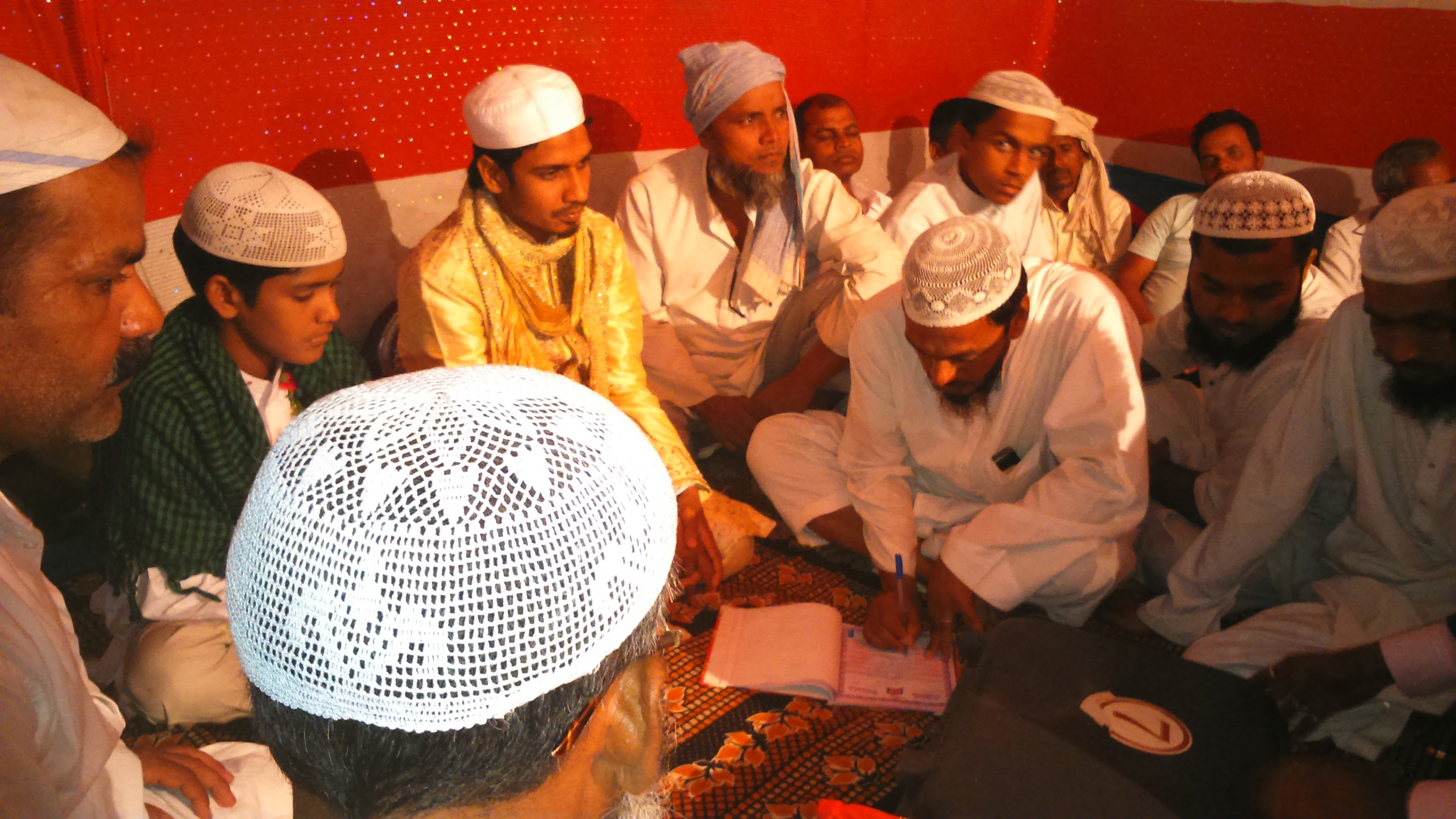
A Nikah ceremony in Bihar, India

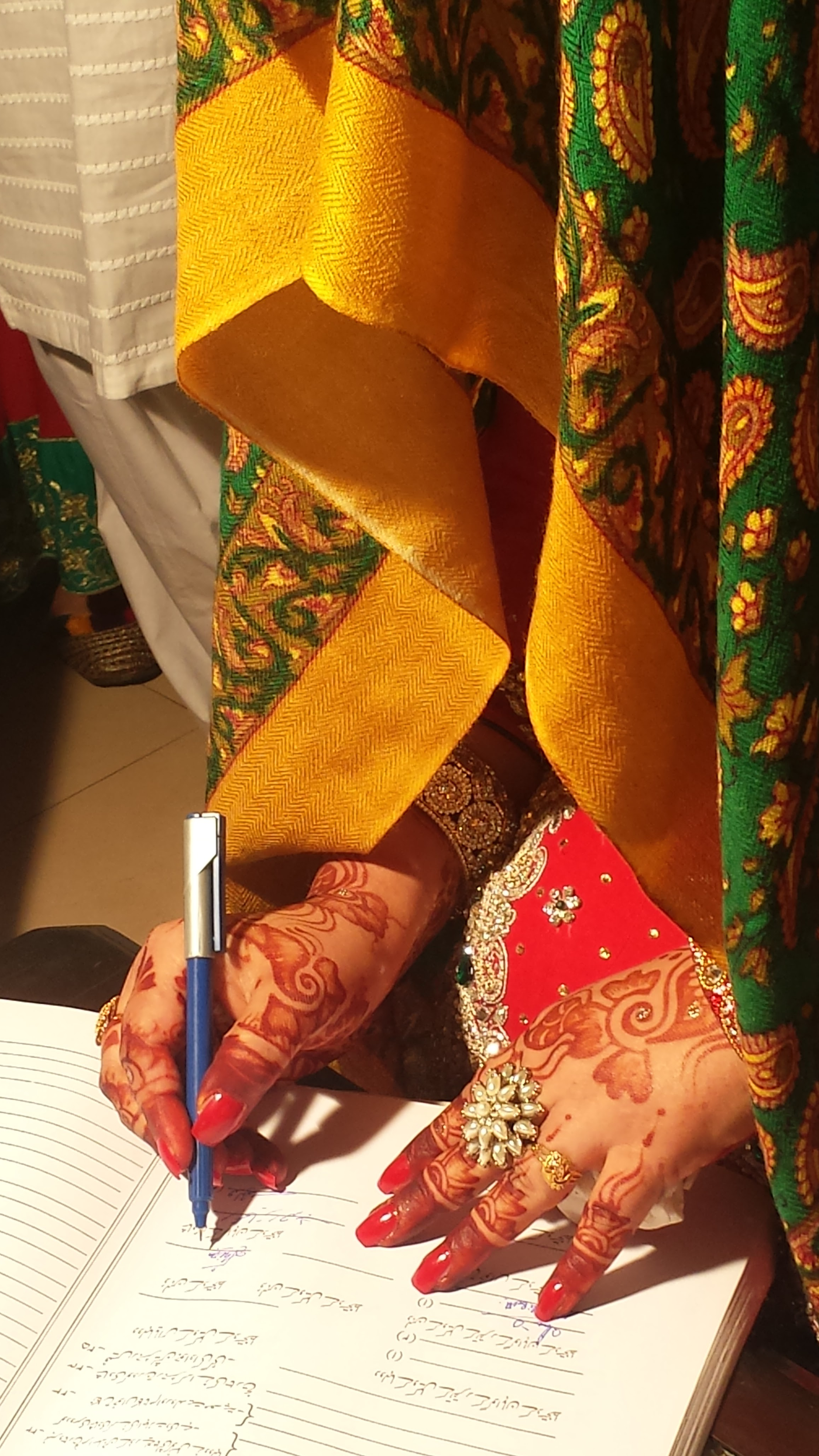
A Pakistani bride signing a marriage certificate

Islamic marriage is based on a contract (ʿaqd al-qirān, nikah nama, etc.) between man and wife. (Note: examples of marriage contract format: "Marriage Contract Sample". European Fatwa Council for Halal Transactions. 30 September 2018. and; a marriage contract "agreed upon by The Council of Shia Muslim Scholars of North America at the 10th annual conference", "ISLAMIC MARRIAGE CONTRACT" (PDF). Imam Madhi Association.)

==== Mahr ====
All Islamic marriage contracts include a mahr, (donatio propter nuptias), a mandatory sum of wealth provided to the bride by the groom which should be agreed upon before the nikah, and paid to the bride by the groom at the time of nikah unless they have agreed to delay the time of some of its payment. The mahr is for her exclusive use. If the marriage contract fails to contain an exact, specified mahr, the husband must still pay the wife a judicially determined sum. Mahr functions similar to bride wealth. The mahr is important for the wife in case of divorce. (The value of a mahr varies widely. It is often measured in coins with the equivalent weight of 3 grams of silver.) There is no joint marital property in an Islamic marriage. Other conditions may be included in the contract, such as whether the husband taking a second, third, etc. wife, is grounds for divorce.

=== Consent of bride ===
Whether the bride must give her consent to marry and how she does, varies according to school of jurisprudence, whether the bride is a virgin, or a minor.

- The Shafi'i school of jurisprudence do allow compulsion in marriage if the daughter is a virgin and is for her benefit. Shafi'i recommends strongly that daughters who are no longer minors be consulted before being married. (If the bride is a virgin and is silent when asked if she consents to the marriage, that may be taken as her agreement to marry.) Spoken consent of the bride is only required if she is not a virgin and her walī (guardian) is neither her father nor her paternal grandfather. According to Al-Masaa’il Al-Maardeeniyyah, by Ibn Taymiyyah. Malak was one of the scholars who ruled that a father may force his virgin daughter who attained puberty to marry.
- the Hanafi, Maliki and Hanbali schools of jurisprudence require the prospective bride's consent if she has reached the age of puberty, but if she is a minor she may be married off without her permission.
- According to Shi'i mujtahid and marja' Khomeini and Ali al-Sistani, the marriage is invalid without the bride's free consent and no obligation can make marriage official and legal.

=== Wali ===
Most Sunni schools of jurisprudence (Hanbali, Shafi'i, and Maliki) require a walī (male guardian, who if representing a bride is called a walī mujbir) (Note: Wali means "custodian" or "protector". " the person who has the authority to manage the affairs of both the person and their property." The term for a wali who represents a woman in Islamic marriage is called a walī mujbir (وَلِي مُجْبِر)) to represent a virginal woman in marriage. In most schools of Islamic law, only the father or the paternal grandfather of the bride can be walī mujbir. However, in the absence of these, other male relatives such as the bride's brother, uncle, or even a male guardian appointed by a shariah court or the imam of a mosque may act as the walī, depending on the circumstances.

- One Sunni school of jurisprudence (a fourth school) -- Hanafi—does not require a wali for a bride to become married, even if it is her first marriage. Therefore, the marriage contract is signed between the bride and the groom, not the groom and the wali. (Note: A fatwa by one Shaykh Ebrahim Desai interpreting Hanafi Fiqh states that it is "not necessary" for a woman to obtain permission from her Wali to marry or to be represented by a Wali at her Nikah. The Wali may object if the woman is marrying someone "outside of her scope of Kufu (compatibility)", but not forbid the marriage.; A fatwa by another scholar, Ebrahim Saifuddin, emphasized that a marriage without the wali's approval should be done only as a last resort and that if "the woman marries herself off to someone who is unsuitable" (ghair kufu′), then the marriage is null and void.)

=== Other conditions ===
- Both partners must either be chaste, or if one or more of them have fornicated, they must have made a sincere repentance.
- The bride/wife must be either Muslim or from "the People of the Book" (Jews, Sabians and Christians), but not a polytheist. (Note: (or "idolaters": Yusuf Ali translation or "idolatresses": Pickthall translation).) For women, marriage to anyone but a Muslim man is not permissible.
- The spouse may not be a close relative (Note: Quranic verse 4:23 gives a list of relatives Muslims are forbidden to marry, a class of people known as Mahram (family members with whom marriage is permanently unlawful or (haram): your mothers, your daughters, your sisters, your paternal and maternal aunts, your brother's daughters, your sister's daughters, your foster-mothers, your foster-sisters, your mothers-in-law, your stepdaughters under your guardianship if you have consummated marriage with their mothers— ... —nor the wives of your own sons, nor two sisters together at the same time—except what was done previously. ... (Q.4:23)) unless it is a cousin, including first cousins. As cousins are not mahram.
- Also forbidden to marry are those of the same sex, anyone who has had the same wetnurse feed them.
- The nikah is required to be witnessed by two adult male Muslims from both sides (or one male and two female Muslims) in Sunni Islam for the contract to be valid. In Shia Islam witnesses to a nikah are mustahabb (recommended) but not wajib (required).

== Nikah ceremony ==
Nikah (wedding) ceremonies vary by culture and religious schools in Islam, but some practices are shared. These include the presence of a male guardian (walī) for the bride (usually her father); two male Muslim witnesses (or one male and two female; witnesses are required in Sunni Islam and recommended in Shia Islam); the offering of mahr (a gift from the groom to the bride); and freedom from any Islamic legal obstacles (such as the groom being non-Muslim).

If the conditions are met and a mahr and contract are agreed upon, an Islamic marriage ceremony, or wedding, can take place. Mutual consent is demonstrated in the form of a verbal exchange of acceptance (qubool, قُبُوْل, qubūl, meaning 'I accept') and the signing of a marriage contract by the groom and either the bride or her wali. In addition to the qubool, there should be a recitation of the fatihah (the opening surah of the Quran); a sermon (khutbah), which typically starts with three verses from the Quran (4:1, 3:102, and 33:70) and a hadith; a recitation of a du’a asking for a blessing of the marriage; and a hadith about blessing marriages.

The nikah is typically followed by a celebratory reception (walima) in line with local customs or those of the couple. The walima may last a couple of hours, or precede the ceremony and conclude several days after.

== Contrast with civil marriage law ==
While Islamic marriage contracts may be binding in Islamic law, they are not legally binding under civil law in non-Muslim countries where practices and concepts like polygamy and mahr are either not legal or not understood. Unless the couple wish to have a nikah 'urfi, "customary" marriage, in a non-Muslim country they must register their marriage with a local government body. Registering a civil marriage is particularly important to Muslim women if anything goes wrong with the marriage. If, for example a Muslim man abandons his wife and their marriage is not registered, she may not have legal recourse to seek divorce or access financial support. (In one case in the 1960s, a Muslim woman who had been married with a mahr of well less than one year's income was divorced by Muslim husband after fourteen years of marriage and three children. An American court found in favor of the husband, that she was owed only her mahr and no portion of her psychiatrist-husband’s estate.)

In the United States, Islamic centers often have authorized officiants who in addition to officiating a nikah ceremony can marry Muslims according to civil law, if the wedding party brings a marriage certificate from the county where the center is located. (Polygamous marriages excepted.) (Note: Some examples: Marriage at Idris Mosque in Seattle) In the United Kingdom, weddings combining a legal marriage licence and nikah are less common and marriage problems may be dealt with by Sharia Councils, including the Islamic Sharia Council (ISC) and Muslim Arbitration Tribunal (MAT).(At least one fatwa site advises Muslims in the UK to "complete the civil marriage so that the marriage and rights arising from it are recognised".) In Australia, someone married according to nikah, a Nikah certificate is "an essential document" to legally recognize your marriage.

In at least one Muslim country (Dubai), it is reportedly possible to marry with a nikah ceremony and then marry again in a civil ceremony, or vice versa, or find an imam authorized to do both simultaneously.

In Muslim-majority countries, where the concept of mahr holds strong cultural and religious significance, it is typically recognized and enforceable through Islamic family courts, who are more likely to intervene in cases of non-payment or inadequate payment of mahr.

In today's world, Muslims practice Islamic marital laws in a multitude of ways all over the globe. In the United States, for example, 95% of Muslim American couples included in a 2012 study by the Institute for Social Policy and Understanding (ISPU) had completed both the Nikah and had obtained a civil marriage license, which is required to have a marriage legally recognized in the United States. The study also shares that "In some cases, the Islamic marriage contract is completed once the couple has decided to get married, but cohabitation occurs later after the wedding reception. In other cases, the Islamic marriage contract is completed simultaneously with the civil marriage and is followed immediately by the wedding reception."

There is ongoing debate about whether or not Sharia should be recognized in Western countries like the United States and Australia that would allow for the Nikah to be recognized as a legally valid marriage. There are also other elements to the Islamic marriage rituals that have difficulty being acknowledged in courts, according to the study, including the Mahr, or the dowry. Women who are denied their dowry do not have a clear path to legal contestation in either the US or Canada.

Studies have also shown that even young Muslim Americans who might describe themselves as "not very religious" embrace the rituals of their faith at important moments of transition – birth, death, and marriage. These occasions motivate reaffirmation of emotional and behavioral touchstones, even for those who do not practice their faith by attending mosque, praying or fasting regularly.

When it comes to divorce, the 2014 study conducted by the ISPU states that, "Two divorce rates commonly cited for American Muslims include 32.33% and 21.3%, respectively." Within the United States and Canada, many Muslim couples interviewed in the study mention that they value a religious divorce and its proceedings. Some turn to religious figures to help them navigate the divorce process, while many still go through the courts to terminate the civil marriage. Divorced Muslim women today also face the stigmas associated with being divorced within the North American Muslim community that can make it difficult for them seek remarriage.

Gender roles and ideas about marriage have also shifted since the early onset of Islam when many of the rules around marriage were established. ISPU reports that "the most frequent source of marital conflict in this study was conflict over changing gender roles and expectations," citing a nation-wide increase in women in higher education and professional jobs over the past three decades, and says that they "In many cases are trying to integrate childrearing and family life with professional goals".

== Spousal roles, rights and obligations ==
For prospective partners in the courtship phase, whilst observing a tone of premarital modesty (haya), Islamic jurisprudence permits disclosure and transparency regarding physical traits that could significantly affect sexual compatibility, such as libido discrepancies such as hyposexuality or hypersexuality, anatomical mismatches such as vaginismus, macropenis, or micropenis, and orgasmic variations such as delayed ejaculation. Islam advocates a role-based relationship between husband and wife, where the husband has the main responsibility of earning and the wife of taking care of children. Fatwa and works on Islamic marriage often mention virtues such as "tranquility, love and mercy"; "kindness and patience"; "love, mercy, kindness and mutual respect"; "love, mercy, understanding and aiming to please Allah"; that are to be shown by each partner to the other. As a Sahih al-Bukhari hadith narrated by Abd Allah ibn Umar states:

The Prophet said, "All of you are guardians and are responsible for your wards. The ruler is a guardian and the man is a guardian of his family; the lady is a guardian and is responsible for her husband's house and his offspring; and so all of you are guardians and are responsible for your wards."

== Polygamy ==
According to the Shariah (Law) and the Quran, Muslim men are allowed to practice polygyny, taking up to four legal wives.

If you fear you might fail to give orphan women their ˹due˺ rights ˹if you were to marry them˺, then marry other women of your choice—two, three, or four. But if you are afraid you will fail to maintain justice, then ˹content yourselves with˺ one or those ˹bondwomen˺ in your possession. This way you are less likely to commit injustice.

— Surah An-Nisa 4:3

The warning against injustice to the husband is interpreted to mean treating all wives equally—emotionally as well as financially. A bride-to-be may also include terms in her marriage contract that require monogamy for her husband or require her consent before he marries another wife. Other verses prohibit marriage to a close relative of any of the multiple wives (a wife's sister, daughter, mother, niece, aunt, etc.). Polygamy is legal, (though often with restrictions), in most Muslim majority countries and most African countries, and illegal most everywhere else.

== Unconventional marriages ==
In addition to the traditional marriages there are some Islamic marriages that lack some of the customary rights and obligations:

=== Nikah mut'ah ===
Nikah mut'ah is a fixed-term marriage known as zawāj al-mut'ah ("temporary marriage"). It is a private and verbal temporary marriage contract in which the duration of the marriage and the mahr must be specified and agreed upon in advance. It is practiced only in Twelver Shi'ism and is most prominent in Iran where it is legal.

Before the 1979 Iranian Revolution, Nikah mut'ah (commonly known as Sigheh in Iran) was practiced covertly by very few, until the revolutionary leaders reintroduced it to society. Nikah mut'ah was encouraged through media targeting young adults, justified by the idea that men required an outlet for sexual desire while maintaining morality through marriage.

According to Shahla Haeri's ethnographic study, Law of Desire: temporary marriage in Shi'i Iran, Nikah mut'ah may be pursued for a variety of reasons. In the context of a government that regulates male-female interactions, these include allowing people of opposite sex to "date" and work or travel together. Of note, Nikah mut'ah allows for a non-sexual clause unlike traditional Nikah. This fosters unique uses of Nikah mut'ah unintended by the legalization. Specifically, Haeri mentions a neighborhood that created an arrangement of temporary marriages with nonsexual clauses so that the mahram could loosen on restrictions on male-female contact like veiling for women.

=== Nikah Misyar ===
Nikah Misyar is permanent and permitted by some Sunni scholars, but lacks some conventional conditions such as living together. Most misyar brides don't change their residences but pursue marital relations on a visitation basis. Because the practice relieves the misyar husband of the obligation to support his wife, it is often used in some Islamic countries by men who cannot afford an orthodox marriage, and/or wish to give a legal recognition to behavior that might otherwise be considered adulterous.

=== Nikah 'urfi ===
Nikah 'urfi is a "customary" marriage contract, meaning it is not registered with state authorities. It commonly requires a Wali (Islamic legal guardian) and witnesses and usually involves a written document stating that the couple are married, with their signatures and those of two witnesses, although the commitment may be documented by a recording on a cassette tape. Some explanations for not registering a marriage include avoiding pensions lost when a widow remarries, avoiding the high cost of formal marriages that young couples (such as students) cannot afford, avoiding bans on child marriage.

== Iddah ==
In Islam, a woman cannot marry for a certain period after a divorce or the death of her husband. This period of waiting is known as iddah or iddat (Arabic: العدة, romanized: al-ʿidda), which means "to count", the number of days after death or divorce is what is being counted. One of its main purposes is to remove any doubt as to the paternity of a child born after the divorce or death of the prior husband.

The length of ‘iddah varies according to a number of circumstances. Generally, the ‘iddah of a divorced woman is the length of her three menstrual cycles, but if the marriage was not consummated there is no ‘iddah. For a woman whose husband has died, the ‘iddah is four lunar months and ten days (i.e. about 128 days) after the death of her husband, whether or not the marriage was consummated. If a woman is pregnant when she is widowed or divorced, the ‘iddah lasts until she gives birth.

Islamic scholars consider this directive to be a balance between mourning of husband's death and protecting the widow from criticism that she might be subjected to from remarrying too quickly after her husband’s death. This is also to ascertain whether a woman is pregnant or not, since four and a half months is half the length of a normal pregnancy.

== Divorce ==
Divorce in Islam can take a variety of forms, some initiated by the husband and some initiated by the wife. The theory and practice of divorce in the Islamic world have varied according to time and place.

The main categories of Islamic customary law of divorce are talaq (repudiation), khulʿ (mutual divorce) and faskh (dissolution of marriage before the Religious Court).

Historically, the rules of divorce were governed by the Sharia, as interpreted by traditional Islamic jurisprudence (fiqh). There were several different schools of jurisprudence (madhhab), and historical practice sometimes diverged from legal theory. In modern times, as personal status (family) laws were codified, they generally remained "within the orbit of Islamic law", but control over the norms of divorce shifted from traditional jurists to the state.

Hanafi/Ottoman rules on divorce and remarriage were fragile and complex. The husband, in repudiating his wife, could declare an irrevocable or revocable divorce. The irrevocable divorce was immediate and the women could not be remarried until after a specific waiting period. One example of a waiting period would be having to wait for three menstrual cycles from the time of the divorce. In the case of the death of the husband, the woman must wait four months and ten days after his death. If the woman is pregnant, she must wait until after the child is born before remarrying. If the divorce was revocable, the divorce is not final until after the waiting period. However, they could remarry if it was a revocable divorce. Many couples did get remarried after a revocable divorce.

The women's ability to divorce was much different and much more limited. If the woman finds out the husband has some disease or is impotent, she has grounds for divorce but must give her husband a year to consummate the marriage before divorce is allowed. Also, the women can divorce by using the "option of puberty" in which the women would have to provide witnesses of the menstrual blood. Finally, a woman could use the "hul", which is a Turkish word, for divorce. This is when the woman asks the husband for a divorce, and he repudiates her for consideration. After that, essentially, it is trading property for the person.

The Qur'an encourages cooperation in marriage by laying out specific rules the married couple must follow. One verse says "Consort with them honorably; or if you are averse to them, it is possible that you may be averse to a thing, and God set in it much good". Divorce could lead to women losing their morality or purity if certain values were not followed correctly. The Qur'an clarifies that divorce is not intended to serve as a way to take revenge on one’s spouse. Instead, it is meant to allow the couple to peacefully split up for the good of one another. The Qur’an also allows for a couple to remarry several times. The couple can divorce and get back together up to two times, but after the third divorce the divorce is final and there are no more remarriages allowed.

The reason the man typically gets the right to divorce is that his judgment is thought to be more balanced than a woman's. Again, the only reason the woman can ask for a divorce is if there is something significantly wrong with the man. Divorce was supposed to be reserved as a last resort and not something that was used for harm or for trivial disagreements. The Qur'an says, "Divorce must be pronounced twice and then (a woman) must be retained in honor or released in kindness", which exemplifies that it was supposed to be honorable for both man and woman if it needed to be done. It was not taken lightly, and it was a big decision for both parties.

== Behavior within marriage ==
=== Living with inlaws ===
The wife has the right to live in separate accommodation with her husband and children, if she does not want to share it with anyone like her in-law or relatives. This is the view of most of the Hanafi, Shaafa'i and Hanbali scholars of fiqh. She also has the right to refuse to live with her husband's father, mother and siblings.

Narrated Abdullah bin Umar: That he heard Allah's Apostle saying,

"Everyone of you is a guardian and is responsible for his charge; the ruler is a guardian and is responsible for his subjects; the man is a guardian in his family and responsible for his charges; a woman is a guardian of her husband's house and responsible for her charges; and the servant is a guardian of his master's property and is responsible for his charge." I definitely heard the above from the Prophet and think that the Prophet also said, "A man is a guardian of his father's property and responsible for his charges; so everyone of you is a guardian and responsible for his charges." [Sahih Bukhari]

This indicates that a wife is responsible for the house of her husband. Also that a man should be the guardian of his family, i.e., after his marriage he moves out of his father's house, and runs his own family affairs and is guardian of his family. In a joint family, typically the head is either the father of the husband, or mother of the husband. This also indicates that a husband should look after his parents' house, as "a man is a guardian of his father's property". So the wife should not object to her husband when he is looking after affairs of his parents.

=== Sexuality ===
Sexuality in Islam is largely described by the Qur'an, Islamic tradition, and religious leaders both past and present as being confined to marital relationships between allosexual men and women, and between allosexual slave owners and allosexual enslaved females. While most traditions discourage celibacy, all encourage strict chastity and modesty (see haya) with regards to any relationships across gender lines, holding forth that intimacy as perceived within Islam (encompassing a swath of life more broad than strictly sex) is to be reserved for marriage.

Abd Allah ibn Mas'ud narrated:

We were with the Prophet while we were young and had no wealth whatever. So Allah's Apostle said, "O young people! Whoever among you can marry, should marry, because it helps him lower his gaze and guard his modesty (i.e., his private parts from committing illegal sexual intercourse etc.), and whoever is not able to marry, should fast, as fasting diminishes his sexual desire."

— Volume 7, Book 62, Number 4:

While adulterous relationships are strictly forbidden, permissible sexual relationships within marriage are described in Islamic sources as great wells of love and closeness for the couple involved. Sexual relationship between married couples are even source of rewards from God as doing the opposite, i.e., satisfying sexual needs through illicit means, has punishment. Specific occasions (most notably daytime fasting (see sawm) and menstruation) are times forbidden for intercourse, though not for other ways of touching and being close to one another. Anal sex with one's wife is also strictly prohibited.

So long as it is within marriage, free of lewdness, fornication and adultery, Islam has sometimes been described as having an open and playful approach to sex.

== See also ==
- Islamic marital practices
- Islamic marital jurisprudence
- Islamic sexual jurisprudence
- Arabikalyanam, temporary marriage between Muslim men from the Middle East and economically disadvantaged women from southern India
- Kafa'ah, compatibility of prospective spouses
- Minangkabau marriage, marriage practices of West Sumatra, Indonesia
- Nafaqah, "expense"; financial obligations of the husband
- Nikah halala, the marriage of a woman to a second man after a triple talaq (divorce)
- Nikah mutʿah or Zawāj mutʿah, "pleasure marriage"; a fixed-term marriage in Shi'ite Islam, also known as sigeh or sigheh in Iran
- Nikah 'urfi, a "customary" Sunni Muslim marriage contract
- Polygamy in Islam
- Rada (fiqh), prohibited marriage due to fosterage (Islamic) or suckling
- Salat al-Istikharah, a prayer for seeking decisions from Allah, also observed for decision making in choosing spouse in marriage
- Walima, a marriage banquet offered by the groom the day after the signing of the marriage contract
