= Misyar marriage =

Sunni Islam marriage contract

A misyar marriage (Arabic: نکاح المسيار, romanized: nikāḥ al-misyār or Arabic: زواج المسيار, romanized: zawāj al-misyār also "traveler" or "day" marriage) is a type of marriage contract allowed by most Sunni Muslims where the wife renounces some Islamic marital rights such as living together, the rights to housing and maintenance money (i.e. financial support or alimony, nafaqa), and where the husband foregoes the right to home-keeping and access (his right to have her act as his housekeeper).

Because the practice relieves the misyar husband of the obligation to support his wife, it is often used in some Islamic countries by men who cannot afford an orthodox marriage, and also to give a legal recognition to behavior that might otherwise be considered adulterous.

Although considered Islamically permissible by many Sunni scholars, the practice is socially stigmatized.

== Etymology and background ==
According to Dar al-Ifta al-Misriyyah, the Egyptian Islamic advisory (fatwa) body, "misyar" is not a formal Arabic word and the etymology of the term "misyar marriage" is not entirely clear. However, it is apparently derived from the colloquial word, misyar, meaning to ‘stop by’ or ‘stay for a short time’, because in a "misyar" marriage a husband does not live with his wife but visits her at brief, irregular intervals.

That source also describes misyar marriage as similar to “day marriage”, a "kind of marriage that prevailed in the past". According to the Islamic scholar al-Kamal Ibn al-Humam, "there is no harm in marrying a woman and spending only the day with her without staying over."

== In practice ==
The Sheikh of al-Azhar mosque, Muhammad Sayyid Tantawi and theologian Yusuf Al-Qaradawi note in their writings and in their lectures that a major proportion of the few men who take a spouse in the framework of the misyar marriage are men who are married or women who are either divorced, widowed or beyond the customary marriage age. Shoshana Shmuluvitz writes that while misyar wives may live with their husbands they usually continue to live in their family homes and their husbands visit them. Because the bride is not required to ask her male guardian (father or paternal grandfather, etc.) to consent to her marriage (if she is not a virgin), the marriage may be — "and often is — kept secret". (But if she is a virgin, "she must have her guardian’s consent, and there must be at least two witnesses to the marriage. However, to maintain secrecy, brides often do not seek consent and many weddings go unwitnessed.") Misyar marriages differ from Shi'i mut'a marriages in that misyar and 'urfi marriages (unlike mut'a) may not have a "predetermined expiration date", and so may "theoretically last until death". However they "usually end in divorce or abandonment".

A couple of reports confirm its popularity in Saudi Arabia. A 2021 report from Arab Weekly, described the practice as "often" done secretly, as "a boon for cash-strapped men unable to afford expensive traditional weddings", but also denounced by critics as sanctioning promiscuity. CSIS reports that the practice has spread from Iran and the Arab Gulf to Egypt, where some clerics have defended it (unleashing "a storm of criticism") as an outlet for "the millions" of unmarried Egyptians over 30 who might otherwise never have a legitimate sexual relationship since the cost of marriage there (and elsewhere in the Middle East) is rising much faster than income.

Shmuluvitz describes two very different ways misyar is used and populations using it. One tending to be as a religiously legitimate way for older, wealthier married men to have affairs, often with younger women and girls from poor families who sell their daughters to the man for the mahr (bride price) when the man visits their area, but who are often abandoned by the man who doesn't bother divorcing her. In Middle Eastern society this leaves the woman or girl − who has lost their virginity - unmarriageable, and often lacking the means to sue their husbands for divorce and child support.

Another very different population is young middle class singles in the Muslim world who seek sexual fulfillment but aren't financially prepared for permanent marriage because of low wages, inflation, the long path of education and career advancement. Or in the case of women (especially successful older women) can financially afford to wait and be more picky about suitors for orthodox marriage. (Middle class women may be less concerned about the loss of virginity as they can often afford to have their hymen surgically restored, and "if the affair was kept secret, her family may find a suitor to marry her permanently").

== Scriptural basis ==
The website Halal Marriage Contract offers two verses of the Quran as support for the "option" of misyar.

- “If a woman fears indifference or neglect from her husband, there is no blame on either of them if they seek ˹fair˺ settlement, which is best. Humans are ever inclined to selfishness. But if you are gracious and mindful ˹of Allah˺, surely Allah is All-Aware of what you do.“ (Q.4:128)
- “Give women their dowries graciously. But if they willingly forego some of it, then consume it with enjoyment and pleasure.” (Q.4:4)

A couple of sahih hadith cited by Dar al-Ifta describe the circumstances for verse Q.4:128 as being a situation where a husband loses interest in his wife or the wife fears he will.

Muhammad's wife Aisha narrated: "A man would keep a wife and become disinterested in her. So, she would tell him, ‘I release you from any rights concerning me/I relinquish my rights’, so this verse was revealed” (recorded by Bukhari).

Ibn 'Abbas narrated, “Sawda Bint Zam'a... feared that the Prophet ... might divorce her, so she told him, "Do not divorce me but keep me [as your wife] and give my day to 'Aisha." The Prophet ... complied. Consequently, Allah revealed His words, "There is no sin upon them if they make terms of settlement between them - and settlement is best' (recorded by al-Tirmidhi).

== Legality ==
Misyar marriage fits within the general rules of marriage in law, on condition merely that it fulfill all the requirements of the sharia marriage contract, i.e.:

- The agreement of both parties
- Two legal witnesses (shahidayn)
- The payment by the husband to his wife of mahr (dower) in the amount that is agreed
- The absence of a fixed time period for the contract
- Any particular stipulations (shurut) which the two parties agree to include in the contract and which are in conformity with Muslim marriage law

The Egyptian Dar al-Ifta also agrees that a Misyar marriage need only meet the integrals and conditions of the marriage contract and that there be nothing to prevent the marriage.

According to Sunni scholars (according to Shoshana Shmuluvitz), the Islamic Prophet Muhammad forbade mut'a marriage but allowed misyar marriages for men away from home (traveling on business or pilgrimage, or participating in military campaigns).

However, some Sunni scholars and organizations have opposed the concept of Nikah Misyar altogether.

In the view of the Saudi Islamic lawyer and member of the Higher Council of Ulema of Saudi Arabia Abdullah bin Sulaiman bin Menie, the wife can, at any time as she sees fit, retract her renunciation of her financial rights and require of her husband that he give her all of her marital rights, including that he live with her and provide for her financial needs (nafaqa). The husband can then either do so, or grant her a divorce.

For these reasons, Professor Yusuf al-Qaradawi observes that he does not promote this type of marriage, although he has to recognise that it is legal, since it fulfills all the requirements of the usual marriage contract. Al-Qaradawi has stated that he prefers that the clause of renunciation not be included in the marriage contract, but instead be the subject of a simple verbal agreement between the parties, since Muslims are held by their commitments whether they are written or verbal.

In recent years, Islamic clerics in Saudi Arabia have declared misyar contracts as "legally valid" contracts.

== Western views ==
- It has been suggested by some authors (Lodi Mushtaq, Elie Elhadj) that Misyar is comparable to mut'ah (temporary marriage) and used solely for "sexual gratification in a licit manner".
- According to Karen Ruffle, assistant professor of religion at the University of Toronto, even though mutʿah is prohibited by Sunni schools of law, several types of impermanent marriage exist, including misyar (ambulant) marriage and ʿurfi (customary) marriage, which gained popularity in parts of the Sunni world.
- According to Florian Pohl, assistant professor of religion at Emory University's Oxford College, misyar marriage is a controversial issue in the Muslim world, as many see it as a practice that encourages marriages for purely sexual purposes, or that it is used as a cover for a form of prostitution.
- CSIS also notes it has been criticized as a form of legalized prostitution.
- Shmuluvitz describes it as a "loophole" for prostitution and human trafficking.

== See also ==
- Islamic marital jurisprudence
- Living apart together
- Nikah halala
- Nikah 'urfi
- Nikah Mut'ah
- Pilegesh
- Walking marriage
