= Nafaqah =

Islamic term for financial support of a wife

Nafaqah (Arabic: نَفَقَة), nafaqa or nafkah is the Islamic legal term for the financial support a husband must provide for his wife (during marriage and for a time after divorce) and children.

Under an Islamic marriage agreement, the husband is obliged to pay for his wife's housing (including furniture), food and clothing in the course of their marriage.

The clothing consists of the following each year:

- Two dirs
  - Long shirt with an openable collar
  - Wool in winter
- Two khimars
  - Alternatively, kerchief, headwrap or muffler
  - Silk in winter
- Two milhafas
  - Clothing a woman wears when she goes out
  - Ample and long coat
  - Silk in winter
- Underpants
- Thick coat
- Bed
- Blanket

He is generally also expected to pay for all her medical expenses, although schools of legal thought differ on this point. The obligation to pay nafaqa starts as soon as the wife moves into the conjugal dwelling. Depending on social class and agreement, nafaqah can also include support for the wife's family members or servants, so as to provide a living standard consistent with her peers. In the event of divorce, the same mode of support is stipulated for three months afterwards. When a woman dies, her funeral expenses will be paid by her husband.

The financial rights of children encompass the right to livelihood, property and inheritance. The Quran imposes an obligation on the father to financially support the breast-feeding mother for their child's welfare and well-being. A son will be paid nafaqa until he reaches puberty. Daughters will be supported until they get married. If a poor person earns only a bare pittance, it will not be fard for him to pay nafaqa to his poor father.
