= Nikah 'urfi =

Islamic marriage contract

Nikah 'urfi (Arabic: نكاح العرفي) is a "customary [marriage contract] that commonly requires a walī (guardian) and witnesses but not to be officially registered with state authorities. Couples repeat the words, "We got married" and pledge commitment, although there are many other informal ways in which people marry 'urfi. Usually a paper, stating that the two are married, is written and at least two witnesses sign it, although others may record their commitment on a cassette tape and use other forms of documentation.

Most Arab countries do not recognize 'urfi marriages and do not allow partners to get a 'legal' divorce since the government does not recognize the legality of the marriage in the first place. Under the new personal status law (Egypt) passed on January 29, 2000 however, divorces from 'Urfi marriages are now recognized. While the new Egyptian law recognizes the woman's right to seek divorce from an 'Urfi marriage, the law however does not allow for claims for alimony and child support. Unlike regular marriages, most 'urfi contracts are not publicised, are short-term and do not require men to provide maintenance for the women. Sometimes these relationships are a way for people to have sexual relations within what is perceived to be a religiously licit framework. In many instances, 'urfi marriages are contracted without the permission of the woman's male guardian (Wali) and the relationship is often kept secret from family members.

== Etymology ==
'Urfi (Arabic: عرفي) comes from the Arabic word 'urf, which means custom, convention, or a customary act. Many Sunni and Sufi point of views have often criticized this practice and have related it to prostitution. The term Nikah Misyar has not been used as a legal term in historical Sunni jurisprudence and is argued by many Sunnis to be something new that does not fit in within the Sunni tradition.

In its modern context, 'urfi is used to connote something that is different from official state ceremony or procedure. Thus, a nikah 'urfi in an Islamic state may denote something similar to a common-law marriage in the west, while in some countries, such as Egypt, a nikah 'urfi is a marriage that takes place without the public approval of the bride's guardians, even though the contract is officiated by a religious cleric and sometimes by a state representative.

== Legal issues ==
There are three criteria for defining legal issues in Islamic jurisprudence (fiqh):

- Shar'i: something that is clearly defined in the shariah.
- 'Urfi: conventional or common tradition. An 'urfi definition is acceptable to the common people without any scientific or shari precision (cf. de facto).
- 'Ilmi: a definition presented by science.

If the shariah defines something, all Muslims must follow that definition. If the shariah is silent on an issue, Muslims should follow the 'urfi definition. The 'urfi marriage has always existed, but for different reasons. In the past, it was common among the widows of soldiers who had huge pensions and did not want to lose it by officially remarrying. Now, however, it is mostly among university students and young couples who cannot afford the high cost of marriage.

Undocumented 'urfi marriages are increasingly popular among Egyptian youth. The high cost of marriage forces many young couples to wait several years before they marry. Conservative Egyptian society forbids sex before marriage, so many young people consider the 'urfi marriage a solution. 'urfi marriages are conducted by a Muslim cleric in the presence of two witnesses. However, they are not officially registered and are not legally financially binding on the man. Couples married in this way often meet in secret and avoid the expense of renting an apartment. The 'urfi marriage can be disastrous for the wife in legal terms. If the husband leaves her without granting her a divorce, she had no legal right to seek a divorce since 'urfi marriage is considered illegal. Her husband could remarry. The wife is in a more difficult position. If the wife remarries, she can be accused of polyandry, which is punishable by seven years in prison in Egypt, or she could remain single for the rest of her life.

The new Egyptian law (passed in 2000) recognizes the woman's right to seek divorce from an 'urfi marriage. However, the law denies her alimony and child support.

There are also controversial, unofficial "'urfi" marriages, where a couple signs documents declaring themselves married. The couple does not inform their families of the marriage. Many Egyptian clerics are against this type of 'urfi marriage calling it a cover for pre-marital sex.

An extreme form of 'Urfi marriage is known as zawag al-'urfi: to give prostitution an Islamic cover, some women enter into secret marriage contracts with their summer visitors. Known in Egypt as zawag al-'urfi, this contract is made without witnesses and typically ends in divorce by summer's end. Most of Egypt's Islamic scholars condemn this use of zawag al-'urfi.

== Traditional Islamic view ==
The part of a contract of marriage that is absolutely necessary, according to all Islamic schools – Sunni as well as Shia – is that it is agreed to by the man and the woman to be married and whether it is verbal or written makes no difference, hence the witnesses. The additional requirement is bride's dower or mahr to be paid by the man to the woman; this marriage gift may be in fiscal form (money, gold etc.) or chattel (goods, clothes etc.) or may be promissory payment at future date or in the event of husband divorcing the wife by talaq. It thus includes what Western lawyers consider the three requirements of a contract, i.e. offer, acceptance and consideration (money).

With regard to "'urfi marriage" – there are two types of this:

1. Where the woman is married in secret, without the agreement of her wali (guardian).
2. Some of the fuqaha' say that publicizing the marriage is one of the conditions of it being valid; again comparable to Western requirements of traditional Judeo-Christian marriages.

The former form of 'urfi marriages, is commonly practiced by Salafi Muslims. Salafist practice of "'urfi" follows the simplest of all procedures for marriages in the Islamic world. It doesn't stipulate parental consent, fee, official contract, etc., and even though such marriages have no legal value, its marital contract religiously recognises the union of the couple. Religious supporters of the practice argue that 'urfi marriages are necessary in the contemporary era and it would enable them to pursue cohabitation with partners of their choice, without being burdened by conventionally expensive weddings, while remaining devout in conservative societies. Hence, the custom is popular amongst university students across the Arab world and some campaign for its legalisation. However, according to critics such as Dalenda Larguèche, this social phenomenon has been revived by "reactionary influences" among poorer sections of the youth and assert that it has no place in modern, open societies.

== See also ==
- Islamic view of marriage
- Nikah Misyar
- Shotgun wedding
- Cohabitation
- Child marriage
