= Minangkabau marriage =

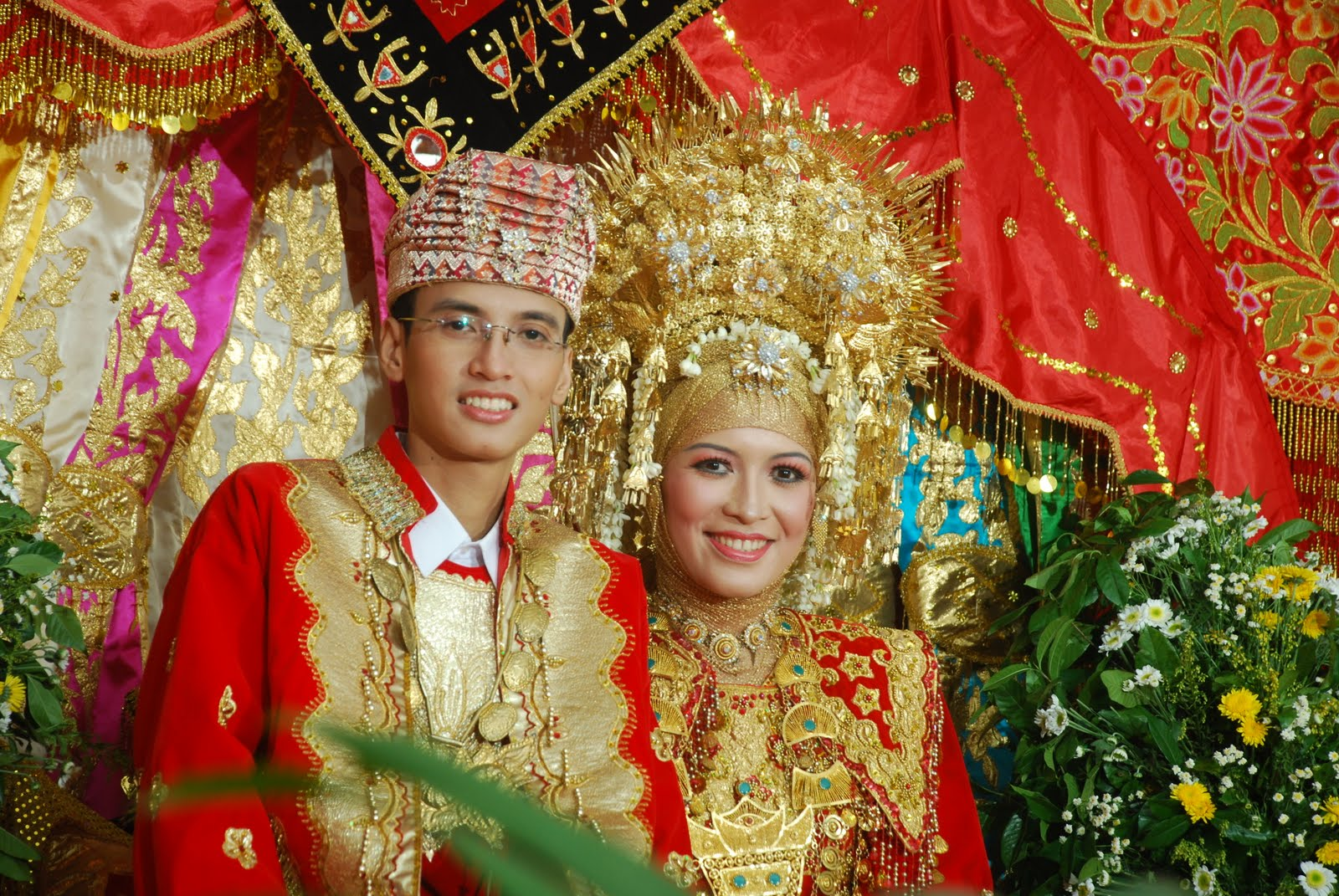
Bride and groom in Minangkabau wedding

A Minangkabau marriage involves the distinct cultural practices and customs of the Minangkabau people, indigenous to West Sumatra, Indonesia.

== Engagement ==
Maresek is the first step of the pre-wedding process whereby a member of the prospective bridegroom's family seeks the courtship of the prospective bride, eventually leading to mutual agreement. The planning and implementation of the wedding generally involves a large number of the family members, especially on the bride's side. It is customary for the female and her family to be involved in most of the wedding plans, including making the marriage proposal, as the Minangkabau culture is matrilineal. The father of the bride has no say in the marriage proposal, as the decision is the prerogative of the maternal family of the bride. The mother's family holds negotiations with the groom's family and decides the terms for the marriage.

== Wedding ceremony ==
Minangkabau weddings are an important part of the culture of the people of the Minangkabau Highlands, and numerous costumes, houses and related paraphernalia is reconstructed and displayed in local museums in West Sumatra. The wedding itself usually entails several ceremonies over a fortnight. Costumes are highly elaborate. Minangkabau whose weddings are conducted in a religion other than Islam are no longer considered Muslim.

== Marriage ==
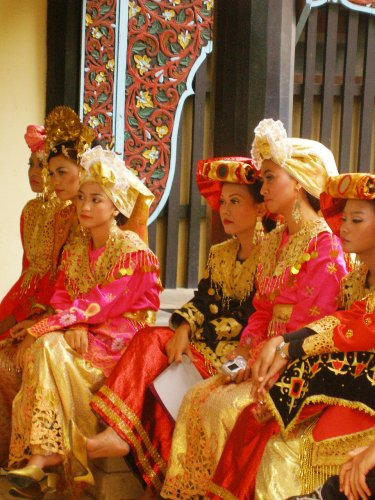
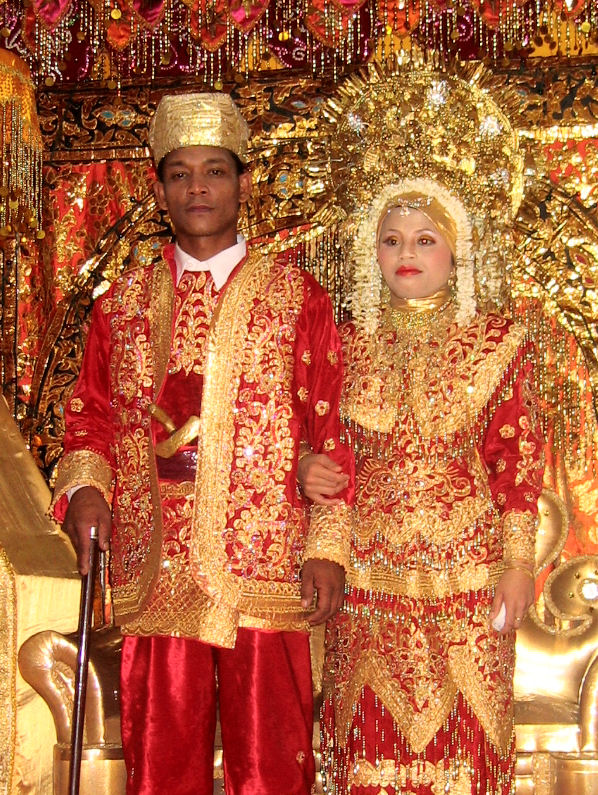
Left: Young women in traditional Minang costumes. Right: Bride and groom at a Minangkabau wedding.

After marriage, the bride does not go to the groom's house but stays at her mother's home. The husband shifts to his wife's house with all his possessions to prove that he is man of substance. The groom normally brings his own bed, chairs, and other necessities of comfort for his stay with his wife in her room and in her family house. However, as per community custom, he stays with his sister even after marriage and visits his wife's house only at night. Since women are given ancestral land in Minangkabau community, after marriage men prefer to go outside the country or outside their village or town in search of greater opportunities for personal advancement. If they stay at home, they are looked down upon as weak, docile, and lacking aggressiveness. However, with changing times and with modernization providing men more opportunities outside their home or even country, many men prefer to go out. It is also now a practice that when men move out to cities where their community is the dominant population, only symbolically do they visit their mother's house to respect the matriarchal customs of their society. Culturally, the Minangkabau maintain a matrilineal society in which women are given ancestral lands and house, family and its upbringing than do men. These properties however are managed by men. The children take the surname of their mother. Property is shared among the sisters only.
