= Sexuality in Islam =

Islamic views and laws on sexuality

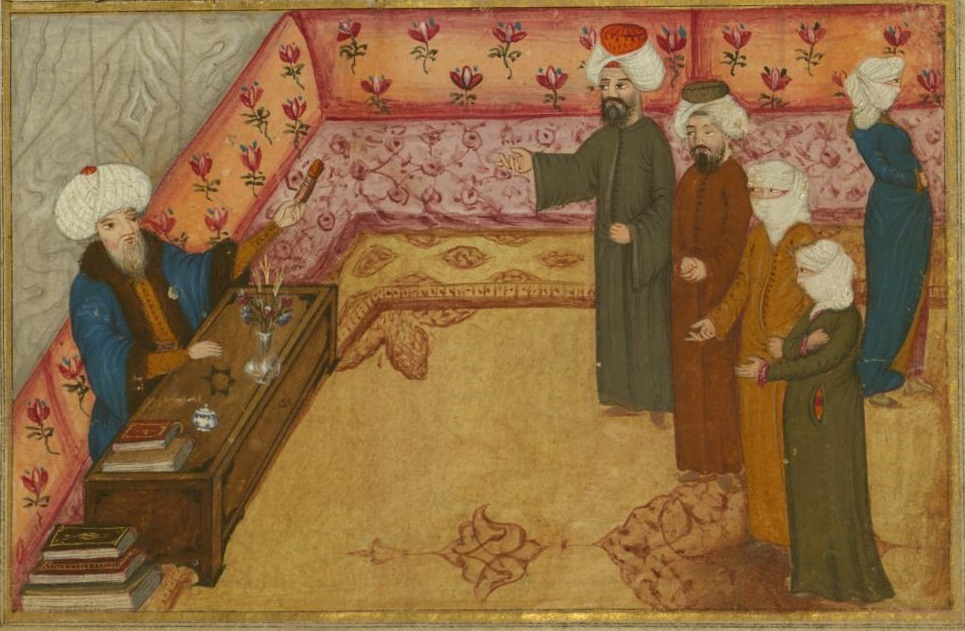
A mufti advises a woman whose son-in-law cannot consummate his marriage (Ottoman illustration, 1721).

Sexuality in Islam , particularly Islamic jurisprudence of sex (Arabic: الفقه الجنسي الإسلامي (Note: Arabic pronunciation: [fiqhul dʒinsiːul ʔislaːmiː]; Fiqhul Jinsiyyul Islami)) and Islamic jurisprudence of marriage (Arabic: فقه النكاح الإسلامي (Note: Arabic pronunciation: [fiqhun nikaħul ʔislaːmiː]; Fiqhul Nikahul islami)) are the codifications of Islamic scholarly perspectives and rulings on sexuality, which both in turn also contain components of Islamic family jurisprudence, Islamic marital jurisprudence, hygienical, criminal and bioethical jurisprudence, which contains a wide range of views and laws, which are largely predicated on the Quran, and the sayings attributed to Muhammad (hadith) and the rulings of religious leaders (fatwa) confining sexual intercourse to relationships between men and women.

All instructions regarding sex in Islam are considered parts of, firstly, taqwa or obedience and secondly, Iman or faithfulness to God. Sensitivity to gender difference and modesty (haya) outside of marriage can be seen in current prominent aspects of Muslim cultures, such as interpretations of Islamic dress and degrees of gender segregation. Islamic marital jurisprudence allows Muslim men to be married to multiple women (a practice known as polygyny).

The Quran and the hadiths allow Muslim men to have sexual intercourse only with Muslim women in marriage (nikāḥ) and "what the right hand owns". This historically permitted Muslim men to have extramarital sex with concubines and sex slaves. Contraceptive use is permitted for birth control. Acts of homosexual intercourse are prohibited, although Muhammad—the main prophet of Islam—never forbade non-sexual relationships.

== Legal prescriptions ==
=== Modesty ===
Islam has strongly emphasized the concept of decency and modesty (haya) and chastity; besides the lawful sexuality, priority is given to modesty and chastity both inside and outside the marital relationships. The Quran warns against immoral lust (fahisha), and the hadith literature, modesty has been described by Muhammad as "a part of faith" in hadith traditions. Islam strictly discourages nudity and public nakedness, and it is also forbidden for spouses to spread the secrets of what happens between them in their private marital life.

=== Education ===
==== Adult ====
Islam has a long tradition of pragmatism with respect to sex education, with sex being readily discussed and not subject or taboo as long as the topics under discussion were Islamically permissible. A hadith attributed to Muhammad's wife Aisha states that the Ansar women in particular were not shy about asking questions regarding sexual matters as long as they are halal. From as early as the 14th-century, entire manuscripts devoted to Islamic sexual education were being written in Arabic in Baghdad, which at that time was a great literary centre within the Muslim world.

The Perfumed Garden of Sensual Delight (Arabic: الروض العاطر في نزهة الخاطر) is a fifteenth-century Arabic Islamic sex manual and work of erotic literature by Muhammad ibn Muhammad al-Nefzawi, also known simply as "Nefzawi". The book presents opinions on what qualities men and women should have to be attractive and gives advice on sexual technique, warnings about sexual health, and recipes to remedy sexual maladies. It gives lists of names for the penis and vulva, and has a section on the interpretation of dreams. Interspersed with these there are a number of stories which are intended to give context and amusement.

==== Children ====
According to Abdullah Nasih Ulwan, sex education is not recommended until the approach of puberty, and children are expected to be taught the signs of this as well as the characteristics which distinguish men from women. Islamic tradition also encourages that sexual education be entwined with morality, explaining Islamic rules involving the covering the intimate parts of the body, 'awrah, and the Islamic positions on modesty, chastity and avoiding promiscuity.

=== Circumcision ===
Khitan or Khatna (Arabic: ختان, Arabic: ختنة) is the term for male circumcision carried out as a cultural rite by Muslims and is considered a sign of belonging to the wider Islamic community. Whether or not it should be carried out after converting to Islam is debated among Islamic scholars. The Quran does not mention circumcision, either explicitly or implicitly—in any verse—while some hadiths mention circumcision in a list of practices known as fitra (acts considered to be of a refined person). However, different hadiths contradict on whether circumcision is part of fitra or not.

According to some traditions Muhammad was born without a foreskin (aposthetic), while others maintain that his grandfather Abd al-Muttalib circumcised him when he was seven days old. Islamic sources that advocate for circumcision also do not fix a particular time for circumcision, which can depend on family, region, and country. The preferred age is usually seven although some Muslims are circumcised as early as the seventh day after birth and as late as the commencement of puberty.

=== Puberty ===
Bāligh or bulūgh (Arabic: بالغ or بُلوغ) refers to a person who has reached puberty or adulthood, and has full responsibility under Islamic law. In Islam, human life is divided into two parts, the first is before adolescence or childhood, when man is considered innocent, and the second is after adolescence (bulugiyat) or adulthood, when the Islamic law is fully applied to man and the hereafter is judged. If a person dies before he becomes an adult, he is considered to be in heaven.

The minimum age for puberty in boys is approximately 12 lunar years, and in the absence of symptoms, approximately 15 lunar years to maximum 18 lunar years, or may vary by geographical region; in the case of boys, the characteristics or signs of puberty, pubic hair growth, and Spermarche ("wet dreams"). The minimum age of puberty for girls is approximately 9 lunar years and if absence of no symptoms are found, it can be considered as approximately 15 lunar years to maximum 17 lunar years or 18 lunar years, or may vary by geographical region in case of girls. The characteristics or signs of puberty in girls are pubic hair, menstruation, wet dreams, and the ability to conceive.

In issues pertaining to marriage, baligh refers to the legal expression hatta tutiqa'l-rijal, which means a wedding may not take place until a girl is physically fit for sexual intercourse. This can also, though not necessarily, coincide with the reaching of sexual maturity manifested by menses or nocturnal emission. Only after a separate condition called rushd, or intellectual maturity to handle one's own property, is reached can a wife receive her bridewealth.

==== Menstruation ====
The Quran makes specific mention of menstruation in Surah al-Baqarah that instructs Muslims to:

"...keep aloof from the women during the menstrual discharge and do not go near them until they have become clean; then when they have cleansed themselves, go in to them as Allah has commanded you".

Language that is taken to clearly imply that sexual relations during menstruation are prohibited. Ibn Kathir—a muhaddith—narrated a hadith that describes Muhammad's habits with his menstruating wives. This hadith demonstrates that Muhammad gave licence to all forms of spousal intimacy during the period of menstruation with the exception of vaginal intercourse. Women are required to perform ritual cleansing (ghusl) before resuming religious duties or sexual relations upon completion of their menstruation.

Sexual intercourse is also prohibited during menstruation, for forty days after childbirth (puerperium), during the daylight hours of the month of Ramadan (i.e. while fasting) and on pilgrimage. While in the sanctuary (Masjid al-Haram) in Makkah, pilgrims are not allowed to have intercourse, and marriages performed during the pilgrimage are invalid.

==== Nocturnal emissions ====
Nocturnal emission is not a sin in Islam. Moreover, whereas a person fasting—in Ramadan or otherwise—would normally be considered to have broken their fast by ejaculating on purpose (during either masturbation or intercourse), nocturnal emission is not such a cause. They are still required to bathe prior to undergoing some rituals in the religion. Muslim scholars consider ejaculation something that makes one temporarily ritually impure, a condition known as junub; meaning that a Muslim who has had an orgasm or ejaculated must have a ghusl.

=== Legal relationships ===
==== Marriage ====
In Islam and Islamic law (sharia), marriage (nikāḥ) is a legal and social contract between two individuals that outlines the rights and responsibilities of the groom and bride. Polygyny is permitted in Islam under some conditions. Both the groom and the bride are to consent to the marriage of their own free wills. Marriage is an act of Islam and is strongly recommended. In Islamic jurisprudence, the primary purpose of sex between marriage and concubinage is procreation. Islam recognizes the strong sexual urge and desire for reproduction and supports a pro-natalist view of procreation.

Divorce in Islam can take a variety of forms, some executed by a husband personally and some executed by a religious court on behalf of a plaintiff wife who is successful in her legal divorce petition for valid cause.

In addition to nikah, there is a different fixed-term marriage known as zawāj al-mut'ah ("temporary marriage") permitted only by the Twelver branch of Shia Islam for a pre-fixed period. There is also a misyar marriage, a non-temporary marriage with the removal of some conditions such as living together, permitted by some Sunni scholars.

In Islam, the husband should have intercourse with his wife according to what satisfies her, so long as that does not harm him physically or keep him from earning a living. The husband is obliged to treat his wife in a kind and reasonable manner. Part of that kind and reasonable treatment is intercourse, with tradition stipulating that couples should not forego intercourse for longer than four months, though some prominent scholars have prescribed a more stringent minimum frequency of sexual intercourse as a religious obligation for husbands; Ibn Hazm prescribed once a month and al-Ghazali prescribed once every four days. According to other scholars, there is no time limit. However, most scholars say that it is obligatory on women alike not to refuse their husbands if they call them, so long as the woman who is called is not menstruating or sick in such a way that intercourse will be harmful to her, or observing an obligatory fast. If she refuses with no excuse, then she is cursed.

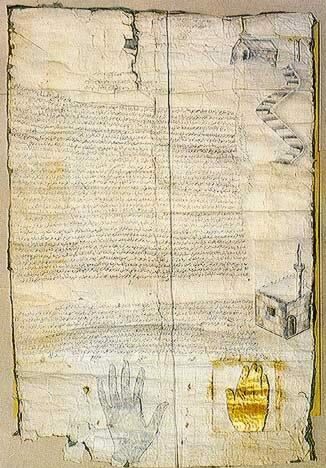
A treaty was signed between Muhammad and Saint Catherine's Monastery allowing interfaith marriage between Muslims and Christians, which discussed in the Ashtiname of Muhammad.

==== Interfaith marriage ====
Interfaith marriages are recognized between Muslims and Non-Muslim "people of the book" (usually Jews, Christians, and Sabians). According to the traditional interpretation of Islamic law (sharia), a Muslim man is allowed to marry a Christian or Jewish woman but this ruling does not apply to women who belong to other Non-Muslim religious groups, whereas a Muslim woman is not allowed to marry a Non-Muslim man of any Non-Muslim religious group. However, marriage with an idolatress or idolater is forbidden.

In the case of a Muslim-Christian marriage, which is to be contracted only after permission from the Christian party, the Christian spouse is not to be prevented from attending church for prayer and worship, according to the Ashtiname of Muhammad, a treaty between Muslims and Christians recorded between Muhammad and Saint Catherine's Monastery.

==== Concubinage ====
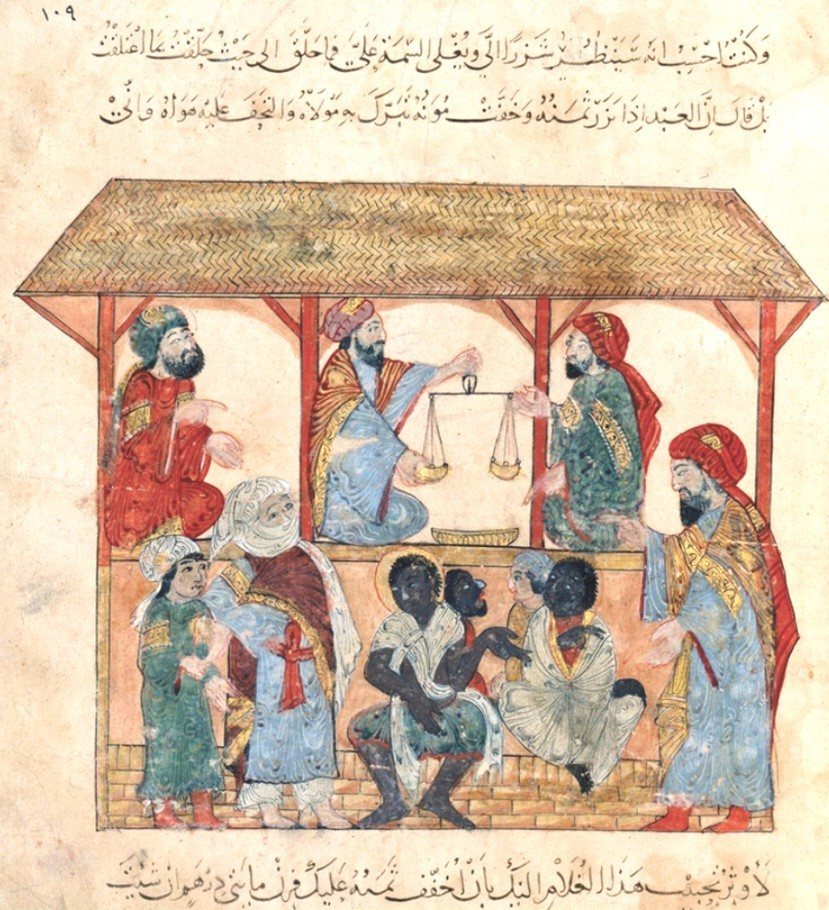
A depiction of a 13th-century slave market in Yemen, where concubines might be bought

Before the abolition of slavery, concubinage existed alongside marriage as a permitted relationship in Islamic law that allowed a man to have sexual intercourse with his female slaves. Concubinage, which was a sexual relationship between a Muslim man and an unmarried female slave whom he owned, was the only legal sexual relationship outside marriage in Islamic law.

"Concubine" (surriyya) refers to the female slave (jāriya), whether Muslim or non-Muslim, with whom her master engages in sexual intercourse. The word surriyya is not mentioned in the Quran. However, the expression ma malakat aymanukum ("that which your right hands own"), which occurs fifteen times in the sacred book, refers to slaves and therefore, though not necessarily, to concubines. Concubinage was a pre-Islamic custom that was allowed to be practiced under Islam through some reform with Jews and non-Muslim people. Muhammad also inspired to free "converted pious" concubines and marry them.

Islamic jurisprudence sets limits on the master's right to sexual intercourse with his female slave. A man's ownership of his unmarried slave-girl gave him an exclusive right to have sex with her under the condition that he could not sell her to others (in order to prevent prostitution of slaves) and neither harm her. A man could own a limitless number of concubines that he could afford and maintain their upkeep, but could not have access to the slave-girls owned by his wife. Marriage between the master and his concubine was only possible if she was granted free status first. To avoid pregnancies, the master had the right to practice coitus interruptus. The birth of progeny would change the legal status of the concubine to that of umm al-walad ("mother of the child"); as such, the concubine could not then be sold and her child would be seen as legitimate and free. On the (lawful) death of her master, she would automatically acquire free status.

==== Purification and hygiene ====
Sexual hygiene in Islam is a prominent topic in Islamic jurisprudence (fiqh) due to its everyday nature. After sexual intercourse or seminal discharge, individuals enter a state known as junub (جنب) meaning ritually impure due to sexual intercourse or seminal discharge.

This state prevents a person from offering salah, and a person in such a state must perform a full-body ablution known as ghusl to regain the state of ritual purity necessary to once again perform prayers, or touching a copy of the Quran.

==== Ramadan ====
During Ramadan, sexual activity is only permitted at night. Although this passage is explicitly addressed to men, the regulations on sex in regard to fasting are universally taken to apply equally to both male and female Muslims.

=== Family planning ===
==== Contraception ====
The Quran does not contain explicit text regarding contraception. Muslims refer to the hadith on the question of contraception. According to Muslim scholars, birth control is permitted, when it is temporary and for a valid reason. As such, the withdrawal method of contraception—'Azl—is allowed according to the hadith. Muslim jurists concur with its permissibility and use analogical deduction to approve other forms of contraception (e.g., condom usage).

Under normal circumstances, sterilization is not considered to be permitted in sharia. The irreversible nature associated with both the male and female sterilizations contradicts one of the primary purposes of marriage which is to have children, as mentioned by Abu Hamid al-Ghazali in his The Revival of the Religious Sciences. Furthermore, sterilization is considered a form of self-mutilation (muthla), which is forbidden. While sterilization as a form of permanent contraception is primarily forbidden in Islam, sterilization is allowed for specific health indications such as uncontrolled diabetes, heart disease, or congenital abnormalities incompatible with life. In such cases, patients may be sterilized after they have given their free, informed consent.

==== IVF treatment ====
As early as 1980, authoritative fatwas issued from Egypt's famed Al-Azhar University suggested that in vitro fertilisation (IVF) and similar technologies are permissible In Islam as long as they do not involve any form of third-party donation of sperm, eggs, embryos, or uteruses.

=== Intersexuality ===
Intersex persons in Islam are referred to as khunthaa in the books of fiqh. Khunthaa are the intersex effeminate people who were, according to Islam, created by God in that way and jurists suggest there being no sin on them. There are three types of khunthaa:

1. A person has aspects of both organs and urinates from the male organ. This person will be included among the males, and the laws regarding males will fall on them.
2. The person urinates from the female organ, so they will be included among the females. The laws related to females will fall on this person. This applies before the person reaches maturity. After maturity, the person will be rechecked. If they experience wet dreams like a male, then they will be counted as male. On the other hand, if the person develops breasts and other signs of being female, then they will be included among the females.
3. When both masculine and feminine signs are equal and it cannot be determined whether the person is more male or more female, then such a person is termed khunthaa mushkil. There are different laws regarding such a person. It is not permissible for a khunthaa mushkil to wear silk and jewellery, as both of these are permissible for females, but because this person's condition cannot be ascertained, precaution demands that such a person not wear silk and jewellery because of the possibility that the person may be more male. Such a person cannot travel without a mahram because of the possibility of being more female.

In medieval Islamic scholarship, an individuals social status was defined by their sex characteristic. Debates on the legitimacy of intersex persons arose due to legal debates regarding inheritance.

Intersex medical interventions are considered permissible to achieve agreement between a person's exterior, chromosomal make-up, or sex organs.

== Legal ambiguations ==
=== Masturbation ===
There are varying scholarly views of masturbation (Arabic: استمناء, romanized: istimnā’) in Islam, largely because the Quran does not specifically mention the subject. Classical narratives of Islam, views prior to the Age of Enlightenment, faced masturbation mostly with indifference. A few hadiths underline this view, stating that "it is your fluid, or your member, so do whatever you like, as it were." There are a few hadiths prohibiting masturbation, but these are classified as unreliable. There are also multiple hadiths narrated by Hasan al-Basri and Ziyad ibn Abihi that convey the Sahabah as having masturbated while away from their wives and concubines during battles, which were cited by Ibn Qudamah, Ibn Hazm, and al-Shawkani and are considered reliable.

Masturbation has nevertheless been considered disliked or prohibited by many jurists historically, though often with the caveat that it may be permissible if done out of necessity. For example, one scholar notably permitted masturbation as a means whereby soldiers, far away from their wives on a tour of duty might remain chaste. At the same time, at certain points in history, masturbation has also been considered sinful, even being subject to discretionary tazir punishments under Islamic law, although no punishment has been established in the aforementioned sources. As such, positions on masturbation vary widely.

The four Sunni schools of jurisprudence or fiqh—Hanafi, Shafi'i, Maliki, and Hanbali—have differing stances on the issue. Some see it forbidden in certain cases (i.e. if it leads a man/woman to ignore their spouse sexually) but recommended it when they see it as a lesser evil to illicit sex. In the Maliki and Shafi'i schools, masturbation is typically fully prohibited, while in the Hanafi and Hanbali schools, it is typically prohibited unless one spouse is unattainable and one fears adultery or fornication (i.e. in a state of extreme sexual desire), in which case, it is permissible to seek a relief through masturbation. (Note: Hanafi scholar, Ibn Nujaym wrote, "It is mentioned in the collection of fatawa Al-Walwaljiya that there is no harm [in masturbating] if one only seeks to relieve sexual desire (i.e. excessive sexual desire that distracts a person from religious and worldly matters). Also if one is spouseless or has a spouse, yet it is difficult to reach her/him due to certain circumstances. This opinion is also stated in Al-Siraj Al-Wahaj.") (Note: The Hanafi jurists have two words for the ruling that the other Sunni schools and Islamic denominations would refer to as simply "Haram" (forbidden) - 1) "Makruh Tahrimi", 2) "Haram". The difference is that what is "Haram" in their terminology is that which is established definitively, whilst the evidence for something labelled "Makruh Tahrimi" is not definitive (e.g. it is based on a Hadith that is Khabar Ahad.) "Makruh Tahrimi" should not be confused with what other schools generally refer to as Makruh – which in the Hanafi school is known as "Makruh Tanzihi" (Categorically Disliked). The Hanafi scholars view the sin of committing a "Makruh Tahrimi" act as lesser than the sin of committing what they call a "Haram" act, though both are forbidden and so incur sin.)

The Maliki and Shafi'i position stem from it being considered prohibited by both Imam Malik ibn Anas and Imam Al-Shafi’i, the latter stating that verses in the Qur'an about guarding one's chastity and private parts applied to masturbation. At the same, there is a minority opinion within the Maliki school that allows masturbation if done in private and without the use of illicit materials such as pornography and drugs. Some Hanbali jurists meanwhile also excuse those under the desire due to not being married, and Ahmad ibn Hanbal also said it is permissible for prisoners, travellers and for men and women who have difficulty in finding a lawful spouse. In Hanafi scholarship, a wife manually stimulating her husband is meanwhile disliked, but not prohibited, meaning it would be preferable not to do so but doing so will not incur sin.

In Shia jurisprudence, masturbation is rarely discussed, though increasingly prohibited, albeit there has always been the view that permits masturbation as the lesser of two evils (so as to ward off falling into fornication). Those jurists who permit masturbation in different cases distinguish between those who masturbate out of necessity and those who have these means yet still masturbate to gratify their lust. Ja'far al-Sadiq in an unrelated narration cited the Quranic verses on guarding one's chastity and private parts on similar issues, though is also quoted on the matter specifically as having said that there is no issue with it. The modern Iraqi jurist Ali al-Sistani has stated that masturbation, while emphasizing that it is haram in all other circumstances, is permissible in case of medical necessity, provided there was no lawful means to achieve ejaculation.

=== Transgender ===
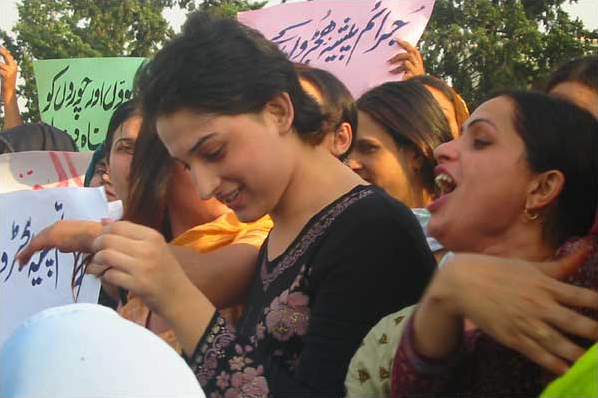
A group of hijras and transgender people protest in Islamabad, Pakistan.

In Classical Arabic and Islamic literature, the plural term mukhannathun (singular: mukhannath) was a term used to describe gender-variant people, and it has typically referred to effeminate men or people with ambiguous sexual characteristics, who appeared feminine and functioned sexually or socially in roles typically carried out by women. According to the Iranian scholar Mehrdad Alipour,

"...in the premodern period, Muslim societies were aware of five manifestations of gender ambiguity: This can be seen through figures such as the khasi (eunuch), the hijra, the mukhannath, the mamsuh and the khuntha (hermaphrodite/intersex)."

Gender specialists Aisya Aymanee M. Zaharin and Maria Pallotta-Chiarolli give the following explanation of the meaning of the term mukhannath and its derivate Arabic forms in the hadith literature:

"Various academics such as Alipour (2017) and Rowson (1991) point to references in the Hadith to the existence of mukhannath: a man who carries femininity in his movements, in his appearance, and in the softness of his voice. The Arabic term for a trans woman is mukhannith as they want to change their sex characteristics, while mukhannath presumably do not/have not. The mukhannath or effeminate man is obviously male, but naturally behaves like a female, unlike the khuntha, an intersex person, who could be either male or female. Ironically, while there is no obvious mention of mukhannath, mukhannith, or khuntha in the Qur’ān, this holy book clearly recognizes that there are some people, who are neither male nor female, or are in between, and/or could also be "non-procreative" [عَقِيم] (Surah 42 Ash-Shuraa, verse 49–50)."

Moreover—within Islam—there is a tradition of the elaboration and refinement of extended religious doctrines through scholarship. This doctrine contains a passage by the scholar and hadith collector al-Nawawi:

"A mukhannath is the one ("male") who carries in his movements, in his appearance and in his language the characteristics of a woman. There are two types; the first is the one in whom these characteristics are innate, he did not put them on by himself, and therein is no guilt, no blame and no shame, as long as he does not perform any (illicit) act or exploit it for money (prostitution etc.). The second type acts like a woman out of immoral purposes and he is the sinner and blameworthy."

The Hadith collection of Bukhari—compiled in the 9th century from earlier oral traditions—includes a report regarding mukhannathun, effeminate men who were granted access to secluded women's quarters and engaged in other non-normative gender behavior. Another hadith also mention the punishment of banishment, both in connection with Umm Salama's servant and a man who worked as a musician. Muhammad described the musician as a mukhannath and threatened to banish him if he did not end his "unacceptable" career. According to Everett K. Rowson, professor of Middle Eastern and Islamic studies at New York University (NYU), none of the sources state that Muhammad banished more than two mukhannathun, and it is not clear to what extent the action was taken because of their breaking of gender rules in itself or because of the: "perceived damage to social institutions from their activities as matchmakers and their corresponding access to women".

Iranian thinkers such as Ayatollah Khomeini permit sex reassignment surgery so that people can enter heterosexual relationships. However, acceptance of transgender people depend on reassignment surgery.

=== Oral sex ===
In Sunni Islam, oral sex between a husband and wife is considered makruh tahrimi or highly undesirable by some Islamic jurists when the act is defined as mouth and tongue coming in contact with the genitals. The reason behind considering this act as not recommended is manifold, the foremost being the issue of modesty, purification (taharah) and cleanliness. In Twelver Shia Islam, oral sex is permitted as long as najis—likely semen—is not consumed.

The most common argument states that the mouth and tongue are used for recitation of the Quran and for the remembrance of God (dhikr). The status of contact between genitals and mouth and genital secretions is also debated among the four Sunni schools, some scholars viewing them as impure and others not.

=== Abortion ===
Islamic schools of law have differing opinions on abortion, though it is prohibited or discouraged by most. However, abortion is allowed under certain circumstances, such as if the mother's health is threatened. If the abortion is necessary to save the woman's life, Muslims universally agree that her life takes precedence over the life of the fetus.

Muslim views on abortion are also shaped by the Hadith as well as by the opinions of legal and religious scholars and commentators. In Islam, the fetus is believed to become a living soul after four months of gestation, and abortion after that point is generally viewed as impermissible. Many Islamic thinkers recognize exceptions to this rule for certain circumstances; Azizah Y. al-Hibri notes that: "the majority of Muslim scholars permit abortion, although they differ on the stage of fetal development beyond which it becomes prohibited".

Some Muslim scholars hold that the child of rape is a legitimate human being and therefore subject to the normal laws of abortion, that it is permitted only if the fetus is less than four months old, or if it endangers the life of its mother. Certain contemporary fatwas have also laid out the position that permit abortion if the newborn might suffer from a congenital condition that would make its care exceptionally difficult for the parents.

== Legal prohibitions ==
=== Immodesty ===
Islam strictly prohibits fahisha, an Arabic word commonly meaning lewdness and indecency. Pornography is also included in fahisha. Salah is supposed to prevent one from indecency (fahisha) and evil deeds (munkar).

=== Zina (unlawful sexual intercourse) ===
According to Islamic laws made by exegesis of the Quran and the Hadiths, all sexual relationships except with a spouse (or a man's concubine) are considered zina (fornication). Zina must also be committed by a person of their own free will. According to traditional jurisprudence, zina can include fornication, adultery, prostitution, rape (on the rapist's part), anal sex, incest, and bestiality.

==== Prostitution ====
According to Abdel Sabour Abdel Qawi Misry, prostitution in Islam is forbidden. Daz Austin Endshow says that, Quran says about prostitution that female slaves should not be forced into prostitution. Islamic prophet Muhammad said: "There is no prostitution in Islam...". The penalty for prostitution in Islam is one hundred lashes for the adulterer or adulteress.

If a married man or woman is practicing prostitution, the punishment amounts to death by stoning. Despite the severity of the punishments, Islam has established laws that make the practice of punishment against perpetrators of prostitution extremely difficult, as it is required to punish the practitioner of prostitution that he personally confess. By engaging in it, or that there are four witnesses who witnessed the act of having sex, provided that the adulterer has a clear vision beyond doubt, provided that part of his penis—the glans or more—is absent in the adulteress's vagina, and that none of the four witnesses retract his testimony, otherwise the remaining three or less will become guilty. On charges of slandering a man and a woman, the punishment for slander is imposed on them. Islam also imposes strict punishments on those who accuse chaste women of engaging in prostitution without evidence, namely four witnesses.

==== Rape ====
Rape is considered a serious sexual crime in Islam, and can be defined in Islamic law as: "Forcible illegal sexual intercourse by a man with a woman who is not legally married to him, without her free will and consent".

Classical Islamic law defined what today is commonly called "rape" as a coercive form of fornication or adultery (zina). This basic definition of rape as "coercive zina" meant that all the normal legal principles that pertained to zina—its definition, punishment and establishment through evidence—were also applicable to rape; the prototypical act of zina was defined as sexual intercourse between a man and a woman over whom the man has neither a conjugal nor an ownership right. Zina was established, according to classical law, through confession by one or both parties as well as proof. A second type of evidence—pregnancy in an unmarried/unowned woman—was contested between the schools. The stringent evidentiary and procedural standards for implementing the zina punishment may have functioned to offset the severity of the punishment itself, an effect that seems to have been intended by legal authorities, who in the early period developed legal maxims encouraging averting the ḥadd punishments as much as possible, whether through claiming ambiguity (shubhah) or a lack of legal capacity (ahliyya).

The requirements for proof of rape, by contrast, are less stringent, and do not require any extraneous witness testimony, eyewitness or otherwise:

"Rape charges can be brought and a case proven based on the sole testimony of the victim, providing that circumstantial evidence supports the allegations. It is these strict criteria of proof which lead to the frequent observation that where injustice against women does occur, it is not because of Islamic law. It happens either due to misinterpretation of the intricacies of the Sharia laws governing these matters, or cultural traditions; or due to corruption and blatant disregard of the law, or indeed some combination of these phenomena."

Caliph Umar accepted the testimony of a single individual who heard the rape victim call for help as evidence that rape occurred. Imam Malik ibn Anas accepted physical injuries on the victim as evidence that rape occurred. If a woman claims to have been raped or sexually abused under duress, she will be acquitted of adultery in light of a Quranic verse within Surah an-Nur, which states that a woman has not sinned when compelled to commit this crime.

According to Professor Oliver Leaman, the required testimony of four male witnesses who eyewitnessed the actual penetration applies only to consensual illicit sexual relations (whether adultery or fornication), not to the non-consensual crime of rape.

What distinguished a prototypical act of zina from an act of rape, for the jurists, was that in the prototypical case, both parties act out of their own volition, while in an act of rape, only one of the parties does so. Jurists admitted a wide array of situations as being "coercive" in nature, including the application of physical force, the presence of duress, or the threat of future harm either to oneself or those close to oneself; they also included in their definition of "coercion" the inability to give valid consent, as in the case of minors, mentally ill, or unconscious persons. Muslim jurists from the earliest period of Islamic law agreed that perpetrators of coercive zina should receive the ḥadd punishment normally applicable to their personal status and sexual status, but that the ḥadd punishment should not be applied to victims of coercive or nonconsensual zina due to their reduced capacity.

==== Incest ====
Marriage is not allowed between most relatives with whom relations would typically considered incestuous, including a man marrying his mother, daughter, sister, aunt, niece or mother-in-law. However cousin marriages are not prohibited and are widely practiced throughout many parts of the Islamic world, as they are not considered mahrams, or direct relatives. Other prohibited marriages include step-children born of a spouse whom the individual has consummated the marriage with, or multiple sisters from the same family. Incestuous relationships in Islam (zinā bi'l-mahārim) are those with any of a person's mahram, a definition of nuclear and extended family derived from the Hadith.

==== Anal sex ====
All Sunni Muslim jurists agree that anal sex is haram ("prohibited"), based on the Hadith of Muhammad. In contrast, according to Twelver Shia Muslim jurists, anal sex is considered makruh ("strongly disliked") but is permissible with the consent of the wife.

Many scholars point to the story of Lut (Lot) in the Quran as an example of sodomy being an egregious sin. However multiple others hold the view that the destruction of Sodom and Gomorrah was not specifically due to the sodomy practiced in those towns, but as a combination of multiple transgressions. The death by stoning for people of Sodom and Gomorrah is similar to the stoning punishment stipulated for illegal heterosexual sex. There is no punishment for a man who sodomizes a woman because it is not tied to procreation. However, other jurists insist that any act of lust in which the result is the injecting of semen into another person constitutes sexual intercourse.

Sodomy often falls under that same category as sex between an unmarried man and woman. Male-male intercourse is referred to as liwat while female-female intercourse is referred to as sihaq. Both are considered reprehensible acts but there is no consensus on punishment for either. Some jurists define zina exclusively as the act of unlawful vaginal penetration, hence categorizing and punishing anal penetration in different ways. Other jurists included both vaginal and anal penetration within the definition of zina and hence extended the punishment of the one to the other.

Religious discourse has mostly focused on such sexual acts, which are unambiguously condemned. The Quran refers explicitly to male-male sexual relations only in the context of the story of Lot, but labels the Sodomites' actions—universally understood in the later tradition as anal intercourse—an "abomination" (female-female relations are not addressed). Reported pronouncements by Muhammad (hadith) reinforce the interdiction on male-male sodomy, although there are no reports of his ever adjudicating an actual case of such an offence; he is also quoted as condemning cross-gender behaviour for both sexes and banishing them from local places, but it is unclear to what extent this is to be understood as involving sexual relations. Several early caliphs, confronted with cases of sodomy between males, are said to have had both partners executed, by a variety of means. While taking such precedents into account, medieval jurists were unable to achieve a consensus on this issue; some legal schools prescribed capital punishment for sodomy, but others opted only for a relatively mild discretionary punishment. There was general agreement, however, that other homosexual acts—including any between females—were lesser offences, subject only to discretionary punishment.

==== Homosexuality ====
The Quran strictly prohibits homosexuality through the story of Lot, in Surah an-Nisa, Surah al-A'raf, and possibly verses in other Surahs. For example, Abu Dawud states, al-Nuwayri (1272–1332) in his nihaya reports that Muhammad is: "alleged to have said what he feared most for his community were the practices of the people of Lot". Classical Islamic jurists did not deal with homosexuality as a sexual orientation, since the latter concept is modern and has no equivalent in traditional law, which dealt with it under the technical terms of liwat and zina. Most legal schools treat homosexual intercourse with penetration similarly to unlawful heterosexual intercourse under the rubric of zina, but there are differences of opinion with respect to methods of punishment.

There is disagreement over what punishments should be administered according to the above Quranic and prophetic orders. Early Caliphs were known to have had both of the male partners executed in various ways. Some other jurists believe that there is no punishment that will serve as an effective purgative for this act, and therefore its immorality precludes an earthly punishment. Some jurists are so morally offended by homosexuality that just the discussion around it is cause for excommunication and anathematizing.

===== Lesbianism =====
The discourse on homosexuality in Islam is primarily concerned with activities between men. There are, however, a few Hadith mentioning homosexual behaviour in women. Although punishment for lesbianism is rarely mentioned in the histories, al-Tabari records an example of the casual execution of a pair of lesbian slave-girls in the harem of al-Hadi, in a collection of highly critical anecdotes pertaining to that Caliph's actions as ruler. Some jurists viewed sexual intercourse as possible only for an individual who possesses a phallus; hence those definitions of sexual intercourse that rely on the entry of as little of the corona of the phallus into a partner's orifice. Since women do not possess a phallus and cannot have intercourse with one another, they are, in this interpretation, physically incapable of committing zina.

==== Bestiality ====
According to hadith, bestiality is defined under zina and its punishment is execution of the accused man or woman along with the animal.

Narrated Ibn 'Abbas: That the Messenger of Allah said: "Whomever you see having relations with an animal then kill him and kill animal." So it was said to Ibn 'Abbas: "What is the case of the animal?" He said: "I did not hear anything from the Messenger of Allah about this, but I see that the Messenger of Allah disliked eating its meat or using it, due to the fact that such a (heinous) thing has been done with that animal."

— Jami` at-Tirmidhi, 17:38, Ibn Majah 2564

=== Castration ===
According to Muslim tradition, Islamic prophet Muhammad forbade castration. Muhammad told a follower who asked for permission to castrate himself to avoid the temptation to fornicate: "He who castrates himself or another does not belong to my followers, for castration in Islam may consist only in fasting". This hadith is in the context of another, which encourages men who are unable to get married and struggle with chastity and desires to resort to fasting, as this helps with lowering libido.

== See also ==
=== General links ===
- Glossary of Islam
- Islam and gender segregation
- Index of Islam-related articles
- Sexual ethics
- Marriage in Islam
- History of concubinage in the Muslim world
- The Perfumed Garden
- Al-Wishah fi Fawa'id al-Nikah
- Wedad Lootah
- Gender roles in Islam
- Salat al-Istikharah
- Political aspects of Islam
- Repentance in Islam
- Islamic marital jurisprudence
- Spirit possession in Islam
- Islam and magic
- Exorcism in Islam

=== Terms ===
- Nikah mut'ah
- Misyar
- Taqwa
- Istihadha
- Aqidah
