= Islamic family jurisprudence =

Legal traditions regarding Muslim Family law

Islamic family jurisprudence (Arabic: فقه الأسرة الإسلامية, faqah al'usrat al'iislamia) or Islamic family law or Muslim Family Law is the fiqh of laws and regulations related to maintaining of Muslim family, which are taken from Quran, hadith, fatwas of Muslim jurists and ijma of the Muslims. It contains pubertal, marital, sexual, child upbringing, adoption and fostering, inheritance, criminal and other related subjects. The subject mainly discusses on foster relationship, marriage, divorce, Ila, li'an, Raj'ah, Khul', Zihar, Iddah, custody and maintenance of children etc. From the political aspects, Muslim family law is a part of almost every national constitution of the world regarding religious (Muslim) laws, especially of the Muslim-majority countries.

== Maturity ==
In Islamic legal terminology, bāligh (Arabic: بالغ, adult) or mukallaf (Arabic: مكلف, responsible) of muhallaq (Arabic: محلاق, tendril, mentally matured) or murahiq (Arabic: مراهق, frequently errant, evildoer in a hurry) or muhtalim (Arabic: محتلم, pubescent) refers to someone who has reached maturity or puberty, and has full responsibility under Islamic law.

In Islam, human life is divided into two parts, the first is before adolescence or childhood, when man is considered innocent, and the second is after adolescence (bulugiyat) or adulthood, when the Islamic law is fully applied to man and the hereafter is judged. If a person dies before he becomes an adult, he is considered to be in heaven.

According to Islamic jurists, human irads or niyah or qasd or free will, aqal or ability to judge right and wrong, and courage are formed before the age of puberty (Tamyiz) and between the age of puberty, and after the age of puberty (Taklif), his intellect (Aql), that is, wisdom and judgment, attains perfection. Therefore, from childhood, that is, before the age of seven, the child is taught the Kitab or knowledge, Adab or etiquette, Ibadat or worship and Taharat or cleanliness, because at this time the child is easily fit to receive education.

== Marriage ==
In Islamic law (sharia), marriage (nikāḥ نکاح) is a legal and social contract between two individuals. Marriage is an act of Islam and is strongly recommended. Polygyny is permitted in Islam under some conditions, but polyandry is forbidden.

In Islam, marriage (Arabic: نِكَاح, romanized: Nikāḥ) is a legal contract between a man and a woman. Both the groom and the bride are to consent to the marriage of their own free wills. A formal, binding contract – verbal or on paper – is considered integral to a religiously valid Islamic marriage, and outlines the rights and responsibilities of the groom and bride. Divorce in Islam can take a variety of forms, some executed by a husband personally and some executed by a religious court on behalf of a plaintiff wife who is successful in her legal divorce petition for valid cause.

In addition to the usual marriage until death or divorce, there is a different fixed-term marriage known as zawāj al-mutʻah ("pleasure marriage") permitted only by the Twelver branch of Shi'ite Islam for a pre-fixed period. There is also Nikah Misyar, a non-temporary marriage with the removal of some conditions such as living together, permitted by some Sunni scholars.

== Sexual ==
Islamic sexual jurisprudence (Arabic: الفقه الجنسي الإسلامي, alfaqah aljinsiu al'iislamiat) is a part of family, marital, hygienical and criminal jurisprudence of Islam that concerns the Islamic laws of sexuality in Islam, as largely predicated on the Qur'an, the sayings of Muhammad (hadith) and the rulings of religious leaders' (fatwa) confining sexual activity to marital relationships between men and women. While most traditions discourage celibacy, all encourage strict chastity, modesty and privacy with regard to any relationships between genders, holding forth that their intimacy as perceived within Islam – encompassing a swath of life broader than sexual activity – is largely reserved for marriage. This sensitivity to gender difference, gender seclusion and modesty outside of marriage can be seen in current prominent aspects of Islam, such as interpretations of Islamic dress and degrees of gender segregation.

== Criminal ==
Islamic criminal law (Arabic: فقه العقوبات) is criminal law in accordance with Sharia. Strictly speaking, Islamic law does not have a distinct corpus of "criminal law". It divides crimes into three different categories depending on the offense – Hudud (crimes "against God", whose punishment is fixed in the Quran and the Hadiths), Qisas (crimes against an individual or family whose punishment is equal retaliation in the Quran and the Hadiths), and Tazir (crimes whose punishment is not specified in the Quran and the Hadiths, and is left to the discretion of the ruler or Qadi, i.e. judge). Some add the fourth category of Siyasah (crimes against government), while others consider it as part of either Hadd or Tazir crimes.

Zinā (زِنَاء) or zina (زِنًى or زِنًا) is an Islamic legal term referring to unlawful sexual intercourse. According to traditional jurisprudence, zina can include adultery (of married parties), fornication (of unmarried parties), prostitution, rape, sodomy, homosexuality, incest, and bestiality. Although classification of homosexual intercourse as zina differs according to legal school, the majority apply the rules of zinā to homosexuality, mostly male homosexuality. The Quran disapproved of the promiscuity prevailing in Arabia at the time, and several verses refer to unlawful sexual intercourse, including one that prescribes the punishment of 100 lashes for fornicators. Four witnesses are required to prove the offense. Zina thus belongs to the class of hadd (pl. hudud) crimes which have Quranically specified punishments.

Although stoning for zina is not mentioned in the Quran, all schools of traditional jurisprudence agreed on the basis of hadith that it is to be punished by stoning if the offender is muhsan (adult, free, Muslim, and having been married), with some extending this punishment to certain other cases and milder punishment prescribed in other scenarios. The offenders must have acted of their own free will. According to traditional jurisprudence, zina must be proved by testimony of four eyewitnesses to the actual act of penetration, or a confession repeated four times and not retracted later. Rape was traditionally prosecuted under different legal categories which used normal evidentiary rules. Making an accusation of zina without presenting the required eyewitnesses is called qadhf (القذف), which is itself a hadd crime.

== Children ==
The topic of Islam and children includes the rights of children in Islam, the duties of children towards their parents, and the rights of parents over their children, both biological and foster children. Also discussed are some of the differences regarding rights with respect to different schools of thought.

== Adoption and fostering ==
Raḍā or riḍāʿa (Arabic: رضاع, رضاعة pronounced [rɪˈdˤɑːʕ(æ)], "breastfeeding") is a technical term in Sunni Islamic jurisprudence (fiqh) of family meaning "the suckling which produces the legal impediment to marriage of foster-kinship", and refers to the fact that under Sunni jurispurdence, a wet nurse is considered related to the infant she nurses. The term derives from the infinitive noun of the Arabic word radiʿa or radaʿa ("he sucked the breast of his mother"). Often it is translated as "fosterage" or "milk kinship".

The concept of radāʿ derives from Islamic and pre-Islamic notions concerning the state of blood relations whereby a wet nurse (and her close relations) and the baby she is nursing (and his or her close family) are deemed related to one another (a status known as mahram) through the act of breastfeeding. One important consequence is that the wet nurse and her family are forbidden to marry the baby and members of the baby's family (e.g. the nursling's biological brother with the milk-mother's biological daughter). Conversely, the milk-relationship allows usually forbidden familiarities between the two groups, (e.g. if the nursling is male, when he becomes an adult he may view the milk-mother and her close female relatives unveiled or in private, exactly as if he were a relation).

== Divorce ==
Divorce in Islam can take a variety of forms, some initiated by the husband and some initiated by the wife. The main traditional legal categories are talaq (repudiation), khulʿ (mutual divorce), judicial divorce and oaths. The theory and practice of divorce in the Islamic world have varied according to time and place. Historically, the rules of divorce were governed by sharia, as interpreted by traditional Islamic jurisprudence, though they differed depending on the legal school, and historical practices sometimes diverged from legal theory. In modern times, as personal status (family) laws were codified, they generally remained "within the orbit of Islamic law", but control over the norms of divorce shifted from traditional jurists to the state.

== Inheritance ==
Islamic Inheritance jurisprudence is a field of Islamic jurisprudence (Arabic: فقه) that deals with inheritance, a topic that is prominently dealt with in the Qur'an. It is often called Mīrāth, and its branch of Islamic law is technically known as ʿilm al-farāʾiḍ (Arabic: علم الفرائض, "the science of the ordained quotas").

Heirs referred to as primary heirs are always entitled to a share of the inheritance, they are never totally excluded. These primary heirs consist of the spouse relict, both parents, the son and the daughter. All remaining heirs can be totally excluded by the presence of other heirs. But under certain circumstances, other heirs can also inherit as residuaries, namely the father, paternal grandfather, daughter, agnatic granddaughter, full sister, consanguine sister and mother. Those who inherit are usually categorized into three groups:

1. Quota-heirs (dhawu al-farāʾḍ), This group includes four males and eight females. The male quota-heirs are the husband, father, paternal grandfather and maternal brother. The females quot-heirs are the wife, daughter, granddaughter, mother, grandmother, full sister, paternal sister and maternal sister. However, there are scenarios that could move the daughter, granddaughter, father, grandfather, full siblings and paternal siblings to the second group ('asaba).
2. Members of the ʿaṣaba (residuaries), usually a combination of male (and sometimes female) relatives that inherit as residuaries after the shares of the Quota-heirs is distributed.
3. Extended family members (dhawu al arham): This includes any blood relative who is not a quot-heir or 'asaba (residuary). Examples include maternal grandfather, aunts, nieces and female cousins.

== See also ==
- Fiqh
- Wali (Islamic legal guardian)
