= Ali Al-Mdfa =

Saudi actor (born 1927)

Ali Al-Mdfa علي المدفع
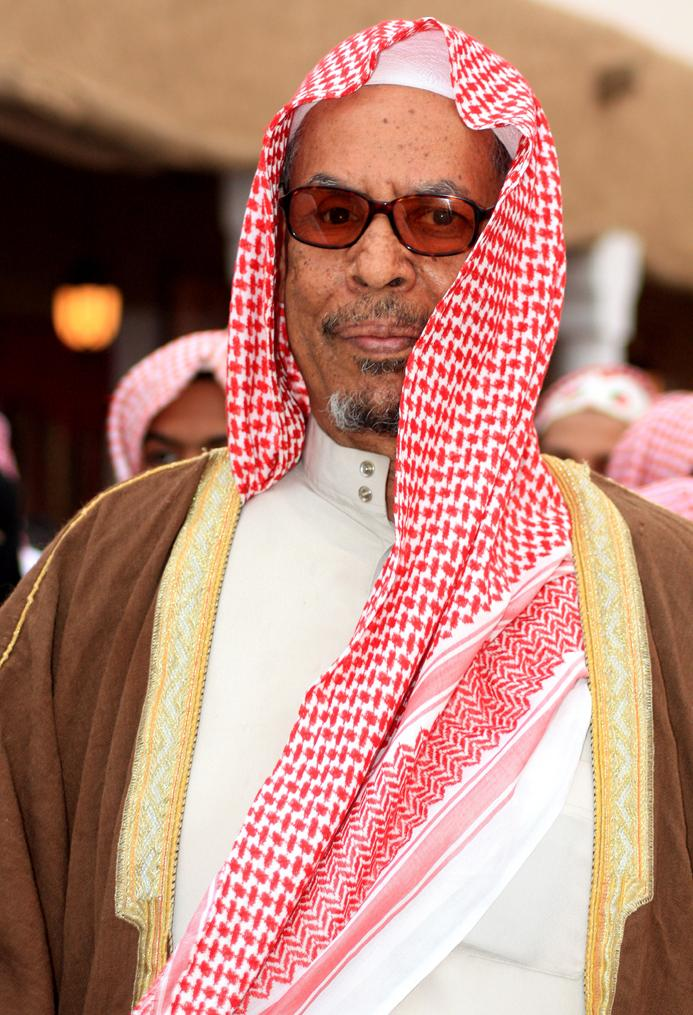
- Born: 6 September 1937 (age 89); Muznib, Saudi Arabia
- Occupation: Actor

Ali Al-Mdfa (Arabic: علي المدفع; born 6 September 1937) is a Saudi actor, best known for Al-Najdi roles.

== Career ==
Al-Mdfa started his career in the 1970s as the presenter of plays and cultural competitions in the Al-Hilal Club. He is a member of the Association of Culture and Arts and has made several appearances on television, theater and radio.

== Life ==
Al-Mdfa was born Ali Saleh Ali Al-Mdfa in Methnb in Al-Qassim. He is married and has four children

== Acting Roles ==
=== Series ===
- Al-Tiaf Al-Qarib (English: Curious guest)
- Tash Ma Tash
- Ghashamsham with Fahad Al-Hayyan
- Shabab Al-bomb

=== Plays ===
- Tahat Al-Karsi (English: Under the chairs)

=== Movies ===
- Hammoud Wa Muhaimid
