= Mohammed Al-Assa =

Saudi Arabian actor

Mohammed Al-Assa محمد العيسى
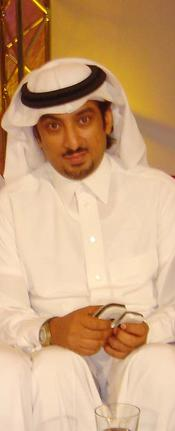
- Born: Riyadh, Saudi Arabia
- Occupation: Actor

Mohammed Al-Assa (Arabic: محمد العيسى) is a Saudi Arabian actor who started his acting career in the late 1990s. He has acted along with Nasir Al-Gasabi and Abdullah Al-Sadhan, he is mostly known for his various roles in the Saudi comedy Aailt Abu Rowaishd (English: Abu Rowaishd's family) and Tash ma Tash.

== Acting works ==
- Bayat Abo Al-asie (English: abo al-ase's house)
- lwaham (English: Illusion)
- Tash ma Tash
- Aailt Abu Rowaishd (English: Abu Rowaishd's family)
- Alawalmah (English: Globalization)
- Boyot mn thalg (English: Houses of snow)
- akab
- Asa Ma Sar (English: Perhaps the evil)
- Akwani wa Kwati (English: Brothers and sisters)
- Al-Kadm Al-Garib (English: The next odd)
