= Combined marriage =

Form of polyandry practiced in the Arabian peninsula in the pre-Islamic period

Combined marriage is a form of marriage between multiple men and one woman (polyandry) described in a hadith attributed to a wife of the Islamic prophet Muhammad. It is thought to have existed in the pre-Islamic period in the Arabian peninsula.

== Definition ==
This form of marriage, according to a Hadith narration attributed to Aisha:

there were four types of marriage during the ancient Arab period. One ... type of marriage was that a group of less than ten men would assemble and enter upon a woman, and all of them would have sexual relations with her. If she became pregnant and delivered a child and some days had passed after her delivery, she would send for all of them and none of them could refuse to come, and when they all gathered before her she would say to them "You (all) know what you have done and now I have given birth to a child. So it is your child so and so!" Naming whoever she liked and her child would follow him and he could not refuse to take him.

This form of marriage was outlawed by Islam, which requires that any man and woman be married prior to sexual intercourse. In addition, Islam requires that the identity of the father be known, in turn prohibiting a woman from having sexual intercourse with more than one man, her husband.

== See also ==
- Islamic marital jurisprudence
- Polyandry
- Pre-Islamic Arabia
