= Maha Zain =

Yemeni actress (born 1987)

- مها زين
- Born: February 2, 1987 (age 39); Riyadh, Saudi Arabia
- Occupation: Actress
- Years active: 2006–present

Maha Zain (Arabic: مها زين; born February 2, 1987) is a Yemeni actress.

== Biography ==
Zain was born to an Egyptian mother in Riyadh, Saudi Arabia, where she was raised. She studied journalism at university.

She entered the arts in 2008, thanks to actress Amal Hussein, and her artistic fame came with Nasser Al-Qasabi in the series Al-Asouf.

She moved to the United States for a time, and lived in North Carolina. In 2013, Zain competed in Miss Arab America.

== Television and film work ==
=== TV series ===
Year	Series	Channel	Notes	Ref
2006	Gashmshm			
2009	Comedo			
2009	Tash ma Tash 16			
2010	Wash Washa			
2014	Kalam alnas 3			
	Zan			
2018	Al-Asouf			
