= Tash ma Tash =

Saudi Arabian satirical comedy

- Also known as: TMT; Tash (seasons 6–18); Tash the Reunion (season 19)
- Directed by: Amer Al Hamoud (seasons 1 and 2); Abdul Khaleq Alghanem (seasons 3–15); Hisham Sharbatji (season 16); Mohammad Ayesh (seasons 17 and 18); Mohammad Al-Qaffas (season 19)
- Starring: Nasser Al Qasabi; Abdullah Al Sadhan
- Country of origin: Saudi Arabia
- Original language: Arabic
- No. of seasons: 19
- No. of episodes: 560

Production
- Camera setup: Multi-camera
- Running time: 21 minutes (without commercials)
- Production companies: Alhadaf Production; MBC Studios (Note: Known as ARA International from seasons 15 to 18)

Original release
- Network: Saudi 1 (1993–2005); MBC 1 (2006–2011, 2023–present)
- Release: February 23, 1993 – present

Related
- Tish Ayal

Tash ma Tash (Arabic: طاش ما طاش, lit. 'No Big Deal') was a popular Saudi Arabian satirical comedy that ran for 19 seasons and is considered one of the most successful television works in Saudi Arabia and the Arab world. The show followed a sketch comedy format. It aired on the Saudi state-owned television channel Saudi 1 for 13 seasons, but in 2005 it was bought by MBC. New episodes ran exclusively during Ramadan right after sunset. The United States Library of Congress requested some parts of the work be placed in the library's archive. The idea of the series started through the artists Abdullah Al Sadhan and Nasser Al Qasabi, and directed by Amer Al Hamoud. After the first two seasons, the trio separated to be the duo Abdullah Al Sadhan and Nasser Al Qasabi, in cooperation with the director Abdul Khaleq Alghanem.

== Synopsis ==
The program is structured as a series of episodic comedy sketches that offer social commentary on various aspects of Saudi society. Each episode features a standalone narrative with new characters, although certain recurring characters appear in multiple storylines. While many sketches adopt a humorous tone to highlight societal shortcomings, others incorporate elements of dark comedy and melodrama.

Considered one of the early examples of self-critical content in Saudi media, the show addresses a range of sensitive topics, including cultural norms, terrorism, marital dynamics, and religion. Through satire, it explores the complexities of social, cultural, and legal issues prevalent in Saudi Arabia.

== Cast ==
- Nasser Al Qasabi
- Abdullah Al Sadhan
- Fahd Al-Hayyan
- Yousef Al-Jarrah
- Bashir Ghoneim
- Mohammed Al-Assa
- Habib Al-Habib
- Rashid Al Shamrani
- Ali Al-Mdfa
- Khaled Sami
- Khaled El Sayed
- Fahad Olayan
- Reem Abdullah
- Shamaa Mohammed

== Set locations ==
- Saudi Arabia
- Iraq
- United Arab Emirates
- Bahrain
- Jordan
- Egypt
- Lebanon
- Syria
- India
- Czech Republic
- United Kingdom
- United States
- Yemen
- South Africa

== Reception ==
John R. Bradley, author of Saudi Arabia Exposed: Inside a Kingdom in Crisis, said that the show continues to run and receive high ratings because, in Saudi Arabia, people perceive comedy to be a good valve for frustrations for social, regional, and other issues.

The show has been a target for religious clergy after an episode aired which criticized the judges of the local courts (who are clergymen) for skipping work or leaving early, leaving paperwork and cases delayed.

One episode portrayed the difficulty for women to do basic things without a mahram (a legal male guardian). The two heroines of the episode were alone because the husband of one and brother of the other were in Paris for a few weeks. The women were harassed and flirted with in parks by young men, escorted out of shops, and turned away from banks. They tried to regain freedom of movement by borrowing a senile grandfather (a cure worse than the disease) and finally disguised the daughter of one and niece of the other as a little boy. Ultra-conservatives deemed this episode offensive to Islamic traditions. Many people considered this episode to be somewhat exaggerated but true.

The two stars of the show even received death threats from terrorists after the show aired an episode which attacked fundamentalism. Actors constantly receive death threats.

In 2011, the show was discontinued, but it was announced that near late 2022 a new season would be released for Ramadan.

Badria Al-Bishir details what she calls battles between the religious police and the liberals in Saudi Arabia. The show is considered a milestone in the critique of extremist thought in Saudi Arabia, which has been used to shape public opinion. It rose in times when the newspapers and TV production were dominated by the liberal party, while the educational systems were dominated by the religious party. The nature of the clash has often been explored in the Tash ma Tash program.
