= Intimate parts in Islam =

Concept in Islam

The intimate parts (Arabic: عورة 'awrah, ستر, satr) of the human body must, according to Islam, be covered by clothing. Most modern Islamic scholars agree that the 'awrah of a man is the area between the navel and the knees, and the 'awrah of a woman is the entire body except the face and hands. Exposing the 'awrah of the body is against Islamic law.

The Quran addresses the concept of 'awrah several times. Islamic scholars have used the relevant surahs and the hadiths to elaborate the concept of 'awrah which is used in fatwas.

== Etymology ==
In Arabic, the term 'awrah or 'awrat (عورة), with the root ‘-w-r, means "defectiveness", "imperfection", "blemish," or "weakness". The most common English translation of awrah is "nakedness". In Arabic, the word 'awrah is used in reference to both men and women.

In Persian and Kurdish, the word 'awrat (Persian: عورت, Kurdish: عەورەت) derived from the Arabic 'awrah, had been used widely to mean "nakedness."

In modern-day Iran, using the two word 'awrah to refer to women is uncommon and is considered sexist language. In Turkish, avrat is an often derogatory term for 'woman' or 'wife'. However, in Urdu the word 'aurat' refers to a woman, especially when showing politeness or respect.

== In the Quran ==
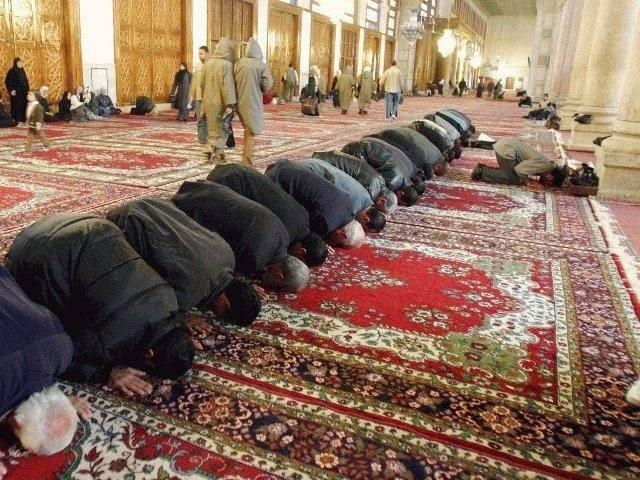
Muslims performing the ritual prayer. During the Salat, the awrah must be covered.

The term 'awrah as it is used in the Quran is confined neither to women nor to the body. The Quran uses the term in various passages in Surah An-Nur and Surah Al-Ahzab. For example:

... [Let] those of you who are still under age ask for your permission to come in at three times: before dawn prayer, when you take off your outer clothes at noon, and after the late evening prayer. These are three times of privacy for you. Other than these times, there is no blame on you or them to move freely, attending to one another. (Quran 24:58)

Another passage using the term 'awrah (in this case, to mean "vulnerable") is in Surah Al-Ahzab, where it concerns fleeing from battle:

And remember when a group of them said, “O people of Yathrib! There is no point in you staying here, so retreat!” Another group of them asked the Prophet’s permission to leave, saying, “Our homes are vulnerable,” while in fact they were not vulnerable. They only wished to flee. (Quran 33:13)

'Awrah is also found in the story of creation of Adam and Eve:

O children of Adam! We have provided for you clothing to cover your nakedness and as an adornment. However, the best clothing is righteousness. This is one of Allah’s bounties, so perhaps you will be mindful. (Quran 7:26)

Another word with an almost identical meaning to 'awrah is the word farj (Arabic: فرج) or the plural furuj (Arabic: فروج). Another quote concerning covering the 'awrah is:

O Prophet, tell your wives and your daughters and the women of the believers to bring down over themselves [part] of their outer garments. That is more suitable that they will be known and not be abused. And ever is Allah Forgiving and Merciful. (Quran 33:59)

The Quran admonishes Muslim women to dress modestly and cover their private areas. It explicitly states that "O wives of The Prophet, you are not like anyone among women" and as such has separate rules specifically for the wives of Muhammad. The Quran tells the male believers to talk to the wives of Muhammad from behind a hijab (curtain or veil). This passage is as follows:

And say to the believing women that they should lower their gaze and guard their modesty; that they should not display their beauty and ornaments except what (must ordinarily) appear thereof; that they should draw their khimār over their breasts and not display their beauty except to their husband, their fathers, their husband's fathers, their sons, their husbands' sons, their brothers or their brothers' sons, or their sisters' sons, or their women, or the slaves whom their right hands possess, or male servants free of physical needs, or small children who have no sense of the shame of sex; and that they should not strike their feet in order to draw attention to their hidden ornaments. (Quran 24:31)

While the meaning of khimār is debated, it is often believed to be a head covering that pre-Islamic Arab women wore as an adornment. Part of the people mentioned in the surah above are those among a woman's mahram.

== In the Hadith ==
This hadith is frequently cited by Islamic scholars to support their definition of the female 'awrah:

"Asma, daughter of Abu Bakr, entered upon the Apostle of Allah (Peace be upon him) wearing thin clothes. The Apostle of Allah (Peace be upon him) turned his attention from her. He said: O Asma’, when a woman reaches the age of menstruation, it does not suit her that she displays her parts of body except this and this, and he pointed to her face and hands." Abu Dawud 4104

A hadith prohibits looking at private parts. According to Abu Saʽid al-Khudri, Muhammad said,

"A man should not look at the private parts of another man, and a woman should not look at the private parts of another woman. A man should not lie with another man without wearing lower garment under one cover; and a woman should not be lie with another woman without wearing lower garment under one cover." (Sahih Muslim 338a)

== Differences between men and women ==
=== Men ===
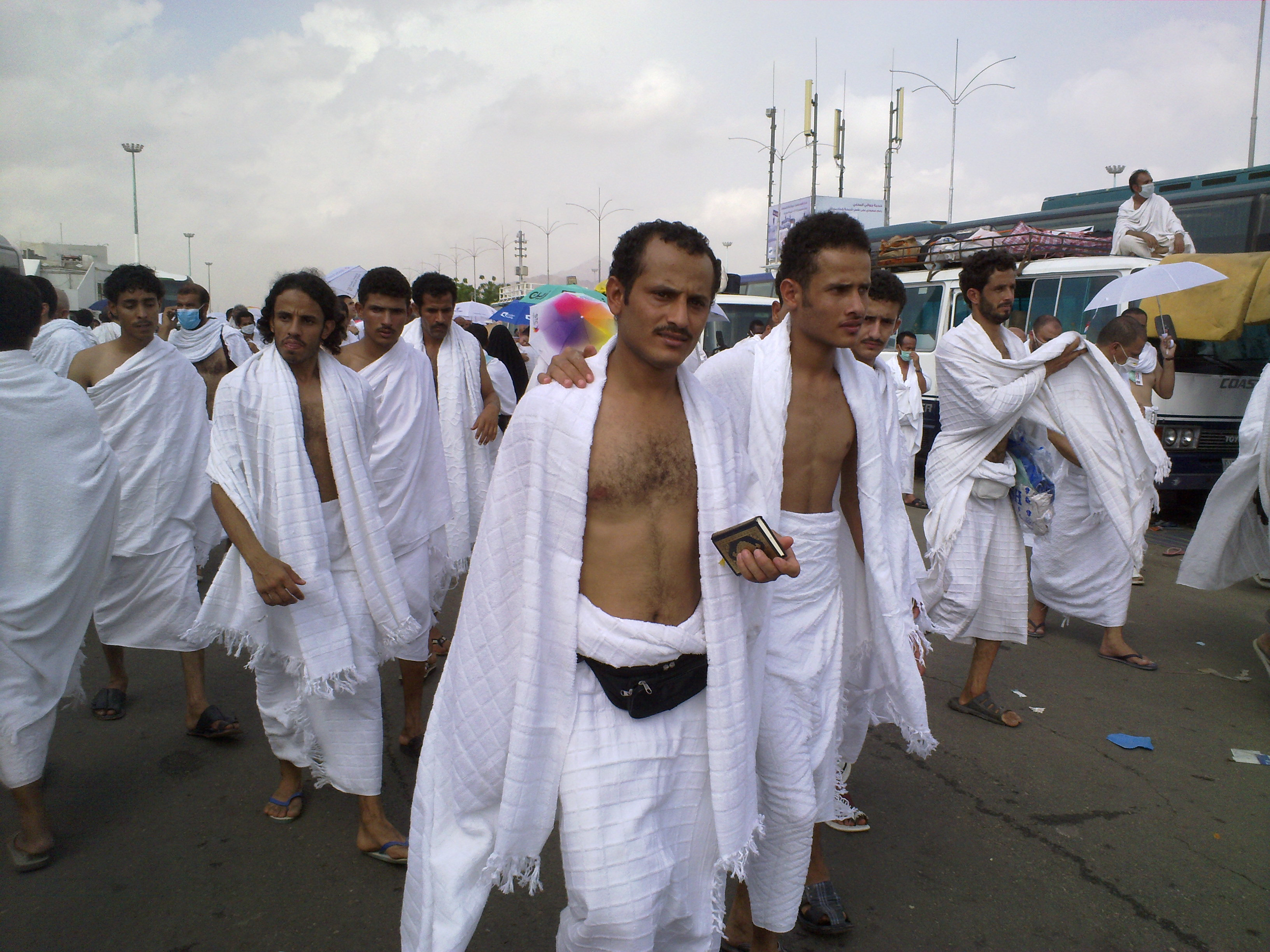
Pilgrims head to the 'mountain of mercy'.

In Sunni interpretations, the 'awrah of a man refers to the part of the body from the navel to the knees. The Maliki, Shafi'i, Hanafi, and Hanbali schools of thought observe that there is a difference on whether the navel and the knee itself are included. In particular, these observations generally require that the cloth not be too thin, that it is not pale to the extent the color of the skin can be seen, that a man ensures extra covering if his genitals' shape is discernible, and stipulate that the modesty of adulthood applies once a boy becomes ten years old.

=== Women ===
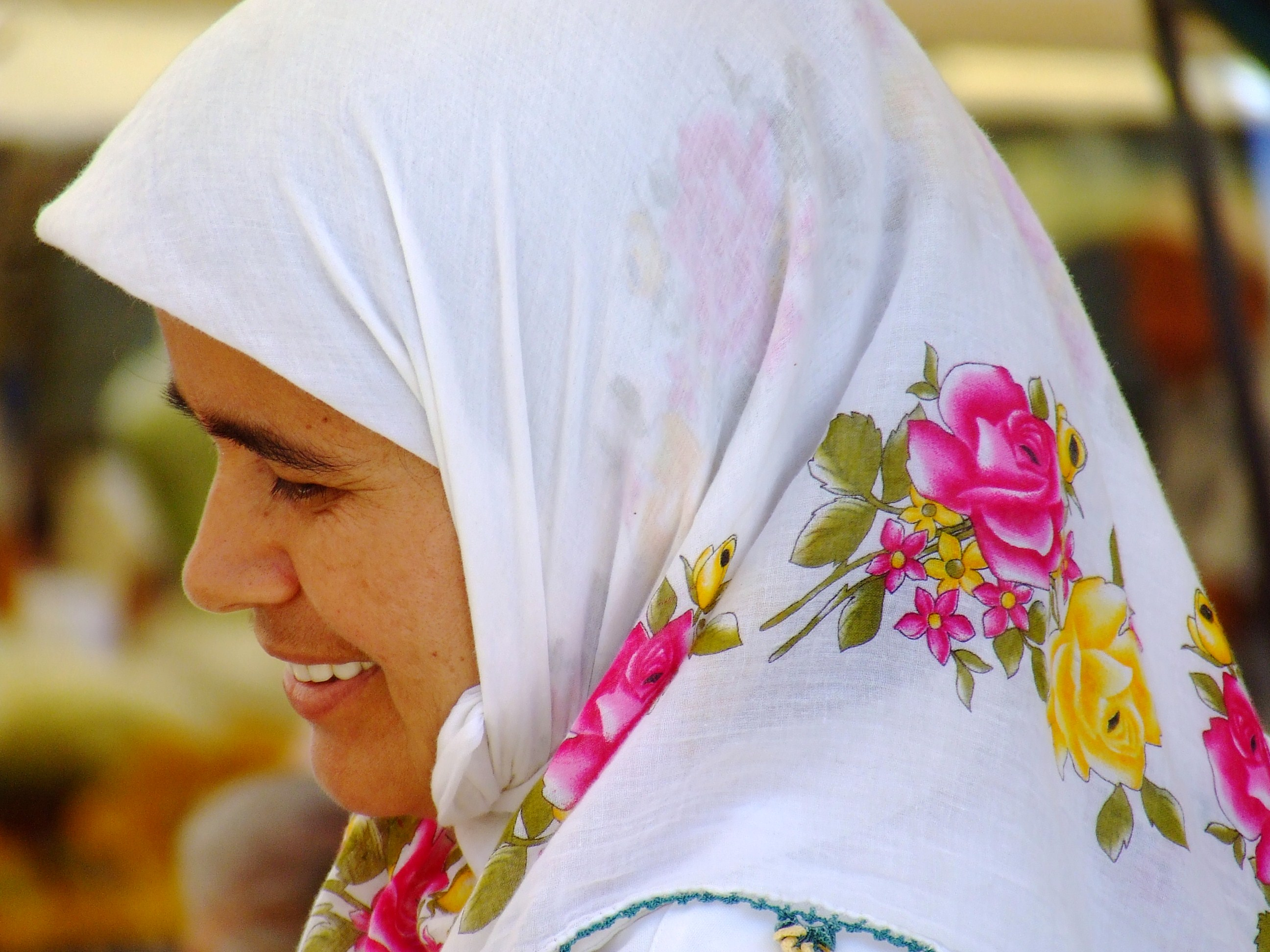
A Turkish woman wearing a headscarf. Most Muslims hold that the face and the hands are excluded from 'awrah parts.

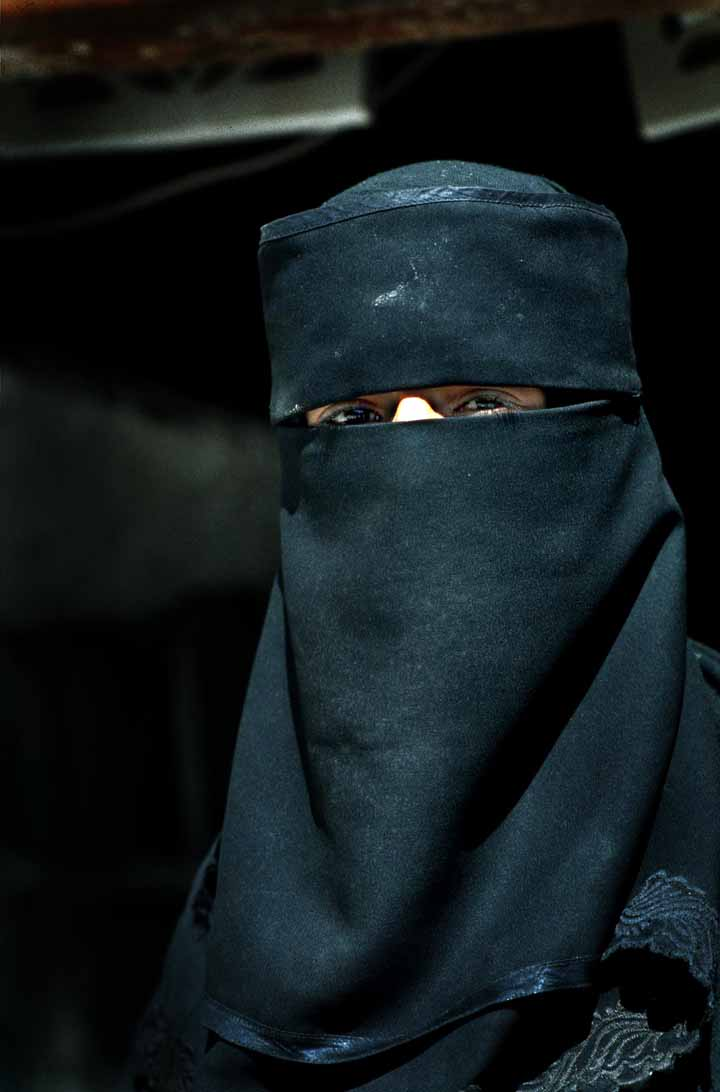
A Yemeni woman covering her face with niqab. Women who wear the niqab may believe that a woman's face is also part of her 'awrah.

Most modern Islamic scholars agree that, in public, a woman must cover the entire body except the face, hands, and feet.

The covering of the female 'awrah changes according to the situation:

- In ritual prayer: A woman should cover her entire body excluding her entire face and her hands to the wrist. However, the Hanafis solely differ on this matter, as they consider that feet, including the ankles, also can be excluded. The area between the throat and the chin is generally accepted to be excluded as well, although different scholars have different opinions on this. A woman should cover her hair and body while performing the ritual prayer, whether she is praying in presence of her husband or she is praying alone in her chamber, as the basis for covering in prayer is different from the basis for covering in front of people; as salat is the daily communion with Allah, a Muslim is required to show modesty while communing with God.
- In front of her husband: There is no restriction in Islam on what body parts a woman may show to her husband in private; the husband and wife can see any part of each other's body, especially during sexual intercourse.
- Among other women: The 'awrah of a woman amongst other women is the same as the 'awrah of men (from her navel to her knees). 'Awrah in front of non-Muslim women is a point of debate. Some scholars say that women should cover all but the hands and face, while according to the most preferred opinion, a Muslim woman can reveal in front of a non-Muslim woman as much as she would in front of other Muslim women.
- In front of a mahram: There are three Sunni opinions, representing the four major schools of thought in Sunni Islam:
1. The Maliki and Hanbali schools of thought opine that the female 'awrah must be covered from the shoulders and neck down (or navel) to below the knees.
2. The Shafi'i school of thought opines that the female 'awrah must be covered from the navel to the knees and everything in between it.
3. The Hanafi school of thought opines that the female 'awrah must be covered from the navel to the knees and stomach and the part of the back parallel to the stomach.
- In front of male children: If the child understands what the 'awrah is, then it is not considered permissible for a woman to uncover her 'awrah in front of him.
- In front of non-mahram men: There is a difference of opinion on which body parts a woman should cover in front of men who are not her mahram. In the contemporary world, there is a general agreement that the body of a woman (except for her face and her hands up to her wrists/forearms) is 'awrah and therefore must be covered not only during prayer but also in public and in front of all non-mahram men. The Hanafis view the feet (including the ankles) to be excluded from 'awrah as well. (Note: The Hanbali school of thought also views the face as the 'awrah, though this view is rejected by Hanafis, Malikis and Shafi'is.)

Other non-dominant views also exist, notably the more relaxed view that a woman must cover her 'awrah only during salah and ihram, rather than almost all the time, and the opposite view that a woman must cover her 'awrah all the time except in front of her husband.

Historically, the awrah for a slave woman during the era of slavery in the Muslim world, who per Islamic law was a non-Muslim, was different than that of the awrah of a free Muslim woman. The awrah of a female slave was defined as being between her navel and her knee. Consequently, certain scholars claim slave women during the era of slavery in the Muslim world did not wear hijab and could also be displayed with a bare chest. In accordance with this definition, Umar ibn al-Khattab once reproached a slave girl for wearing a hijab with the words: “Remove your veil and do not imitate free women!”. However, some Muslims reject this, claiming this narration about Umar to be inauthentic. The reason is that it seems to contradict the Quran which tells all believing women to wear hijab in 24:31 and 33:59. In the contemporary world, some Muslims insist that a woman's 'awrah in front of unrelated men is her entire body including her face and hands, which must be covered at all times in front of non-mahram men. Others disagree and claim it is permissible to show the face and hands.

== Debates, deliberations and activism ==
In modern times, the concepts of 'awrah, Haya (Modesty), various levels of seclusion of Muslim women, and the extent to which Muslim restrain their exposure of bodily aspects and association vis a vis Islamic clothing were not only contested by non-Muslims and ex-Muslims but also continuously been matter of discussions, deliberations, debates, and movements. It has also been part of advice literature, within Muslim societies including that of common Muslim individuals, various traditional schools scholars, intelligentsia, numerous political dispensations and also at times contested by individuals and groups of cultural Muslims; liberals and progressives, modernists and Islamic feminists. In the 1930s just after Turkish reformations under Kemal Atatürk, Malaysians debated adherence to traditional Islamic social restraints over 'awrah and modesty in contemporary Islamic clothing and whether Western modernism is really essential and beneficial.

== See also ==
- Haya (Islam)
- Hijab
- Islam and clothing
- Namus (Honor)
- Niqab
- Purdah
- Sartorial hijab
- Tzeniut- similar doctrine in Judaism
- Islamic toilet etiquette
- Gender segregation and Muslims
