= Yousef Al-Jarrah =

Saudi Arabian television actor (born 1965)

Yousef Al-Jarrah يوسف الجراح
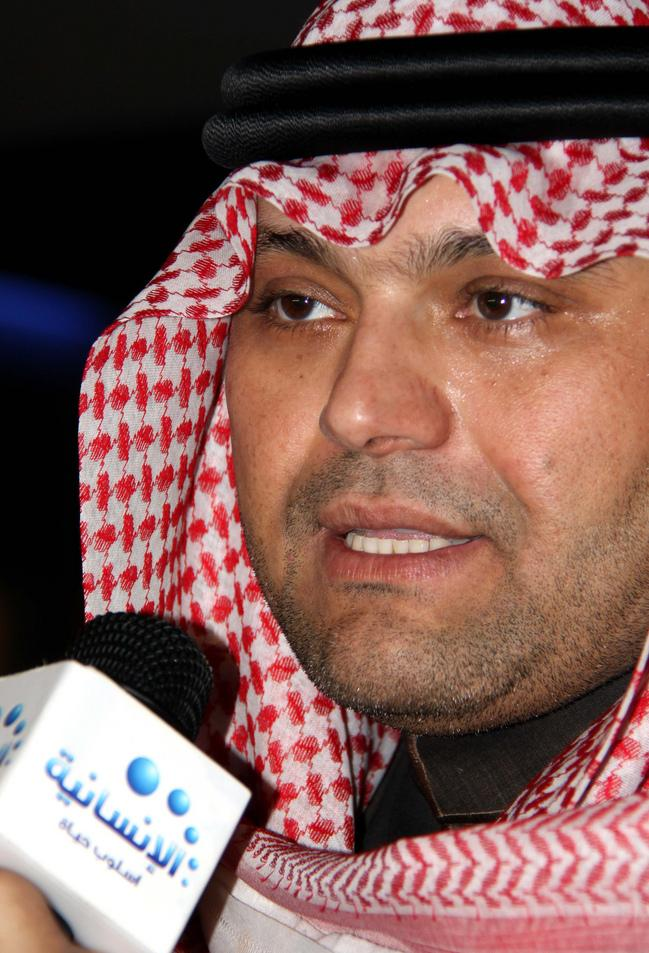
- Born: June 28, 1965 (age 60); Riyadh, Saudi Arabia
- Occupation: Actor

Yousef Al-Jarrah (Arabic: يوسف الجراح) (Born June 28, 1965, in Medina) is a Saudi Arabian television actor, who started his acting career in 1985, known for his role in the Saudi comedy, Jari Ya Hammouda and Tash ma Tash, He is presented the programme called Adam on MBC channel Middle East Broadcasting Center.

== Acting Works ==
=== Series ===
- Tash ma Tash
- Jari Ya Hammouda
- Abu Arroyhd
- Shaaban in Ramadan
- Waswash English: whispering

=== Radio MBC FM ===
- Diary Abbas

=== Programs ===
- Adam
