= Marriage in pre-Islamic Arabia =

In pre-Islamic Arabia, a variety of different marriage practices existed. The most common and recognized types of marriage at this time consisted of: marriage by agreement, marriage by capture, marriage by mahr, marriage by inheritance and Mutah or temporary marriage.

The system of marriage in pre-Islamic Arab society (the "Jahiliyyah" era) was characterized by a wide diversity and numerous forms of marital and familial relationships. This system was governed by the economic, social, and tribal customs prevalent across the Arabian Peninsula. The Arabs did not possess a single, unified system for regulating relations between men and women; rather, various practices coexisted, ranging from formal marriage contracts involving betrothal and a dowry "mahr" to other forms of unions, whether hereditary, reciprocal, or elective, that served specific social objectives, such as enhancing the gene pool, showcasing physical attributes, or addressing economic crises like drought and poverty. Historical and Hadith sources classify pre-Islamic marriages into two main categories. The first category comprises unions recognized through tribal agreements, specifically: "nikah bu'ulah" (involving betrothal and a "mahr" or dower) and "nikah dizan" (a practice wherein a son inherits his father’s wife), as well as reciprocal marriage arrangements such as "shighar" and "badal". The second category encompasses practices that, within the moral codes of certain tribes, were classified as forms of adultery or legalized prostitution; these include "nikah istibda" (undertaken to produce offspring of specific lineage), "nikah rahit" (communal or shared unions), "mudamidah" (driven by economic necessity), and "mukhadanah" (secret unions), in addition to the phenomenon of "sahibat al-rayah" ("flag bearing" women).

Aisha bint Abi Bakr narrated: "During the pre-Islamic era "Jahiliyyah" there were four types of marriage. One type is the form common today, where a man asks another man for the hand of his daughter or female dependent, provides a dowry "mahr", and then marries her. Another type was that a man, once his wife had finished her menstrual period, would say to her: "Send for such-and-such a man and conceive a child by him." The husband would then keep his distance and refrain from having sexual relations with her until her pregnancy by that man was confirmed. Once the pregnancy was confirmed, the husband (if he so desired) would resume sexual relations with her. This practice was carried out out of a desire to have children of noble lineage, and this form of union was known as "marriage for the purpose of procreation." Another type involved a group of fewer than ten men who would come to a woman and have sexual relations with her. Once the woman became pregnant, gave birth, and a few nights had passed since the delivery, she would send for them. None of them could refuse; they would all gather at her home. The woman would say to them, "You know what took place between us, and I have had a child. This child is yours." She would then name a specific man "So-and-so" and the child would be attributed to him. The man could not refuse to accept the child. The fourth type of marriage... "Many men would visit a woman" and she would not turn away anyone who came to her. These were prostitutes. They would display flags at their doors as a sign, and anyone who desired them would enter. If one of them became pregnant and gave birth, the men would gather, summon genealogists, and then attribute the child to whichever man they deemed appropriate (linking the child to him and designating him as his son) and the man would not refuse this. When the Prophet Muhammad was sent with the Truth, he abolished all the marriage customs of the Age of Ignorance "Jahiliyyah", with the exception of the marriage practices followed by people today."

One of the most notorious prostitutes in pre-Islamic Arabia was Zalma al-Hudhaliyya. In folklore and proverbs, she is described as having been a young girl at a Quranic school who, much like the boys, was boisterous and caused a great commotion. As she grew older, she turned to prostitution and illicit sexual relations. In her later years, she became a procuress, facilitating such activities for other women. Historical accounts suggest that when she eventually became completely frail due to old age (no longer capable of engaging in such acts herself) she acquired a male and a female goat. She kept them in her home, observing them as they mated, as a substitute for the activities she could no longer perform. She became the subject of a proverb, with the saying: "More of a procuress than Zalma."

== Marriage by agreement ==
The reason for intertribal marriages was to ensure the protection and possession of the children the couple would produce. Women in some intertribal marriages had more freedom and retained the right to dismiss or divorce their husbands at any time. The women had precise rituals they used to inform their husbands of their dismissal, such as this: "if they lived in a tent they turned it around, so that if the door faced east, it now faced west, and when the man saw this, he knew that he was dismissed and did not enter".

== Beena ==
Beena is a form of marriage used in pre-Islamic Arabia, in which a wife would own a tent of her own, within which she retained complete independence from her husband, according to William Robertson Smith. The term was suggested by John Ferguson McLennan, who noted that in Ceylon (now Sri Lanka) the marriage when a husband goes to live in the wife's village is called "beena marriage", and suggested "beena" as a general term for this kind of marriage.

== Marriage by Mahr ==
Marriage by Mahr was the standard marriage practice. These marriages consisted of the groom or groom's father paying the bride, or Wali (guardian), (usually the bride's father), an amount, known as the Mahr, indicating that he was capable of supporting her financially after the marriage. With the spread of Islam, Mahr became Fard ("obligatory") in Islamic law. However, while pre-Islamic Arabia typically did not give the Mahr to the bride and instead her Wali (guardian), Islam decreed for it to be in possession of the wife (unless she trusts her Wali to keep it safe).

== Marriage by capture ==
Marriage by capture, often taking place during times of war, occurred when women were taken captive by men from other tribes and placed on the slave market of Mecca. From the slave market these women were sold into marriage or slavery. In captive marriages men bought their wives and therefore had complete control over them. Women in these marriages had no freedom and were subjected to following their husbands' orders and bearing their children. These women became their husbands' property and had no right to divorce.

== Nikah Istibdaa ==
In this kind of marriage, a man would refrain from having any sexual intercourse with his wife, and then send her off to a man of higher status, who would then impregnate her in the hopes of getting a child of stronger breed. After the pregnancy, the man would then have intercourse with his wife if she wanted him to; and the man would claim fatherhood of the child born from her relations with the other man. An example of this incident was described to the Islamic prophet Muhammad, who replied that the child belongs to the one on whose bed it is born.

As with all other forms of pre-Islamic marriage, Nikah Istibdaa was largely abolished in Arabia during the 7th century CE.

== Exchange marriage ==
Exchange marriage (a practice in which two men permanently swap their wives) involves no "mahr" (dower) and does not apply to free women; rather, it occurs among enslaved women or those treated as property, such as concubines and others in similar status.

== Rahat's Marriage ==
A form of marriage involved a group of fewer than ten men gathering and visiting a woman, all of whom would have sexual relations with her. If the woman became pregnant and gave birth to a child, and some days had passed since the delivery, she would summon all of them and none would refuse to come. Once they had gathered before her, she would say to them, "You know what you did, and now I have given birth to a child". So, this child is yours, "so-and-so"! She would name whichever man she chose, and the child would be attributed to him; he could not deny the child.

== Fahisha marriage ==
Fahisha , There existed a form of union wherein many men would visit a woman, and she would never turn anyone away. These women were prostitutes who displayed flags at the entrances of their homes (a sign indicating their profession) and anyone who wished could engage in sexual relations with them. Should one of these women become pregnant and give birth, the men involved would gather, summon a "qa’if" (an expert skilled in discerning physical resemblances between a child and a potential father), and (based on his assessment) attribute the child to a specific man. The woman would then accept this attribution, and the child would be designated as that man’s son; the man, for his part, would raise no objection to this arrangement.

== Marriage within the family ==
Incestuous unions or marriages among family members "such as unions with one's mother or sister" were commonplace. In the case of a mother, she served as a shared wife to all the men in the family and engaged in sexual relations with all her children; consequently, all the offspring were considered brothers to one another and also engaged in sexual relations with their own mothers. The only scenario in which such behavior was punishable by death was if the individual involved belonged to a different family.
