= Wedad Lootah =

Emirati marriage counselor and sex educator

- وداد لوتاه
- Born: 1964 (age 61–62)
- Citizenship: United Arab Emirates
- Education: United Arab Emirates University

Wedad Nasser Lootah (Arabic: وداد ناصر لوتاه, sometimes transliterated as Widad Naser Lutah, born in 1964) is an Emirati marriage counselor working for Dubai's main courthouse, and the author of Book on Marital Intimacy in Arabic Top Secret: Guidelines and Etiquette of an intimate marital relationship, published in 2009. She caused a controversy in the Islamic world by discussing sensitive topics in her book, such as oral sex, the anal sex, the female orgasm, the necessity of sex education, and homosexuality in Islamic societies. Although Lootah's frankness earned praise from liberal Muslims, it also drew death threats from fundamentalists who consider the book blasphemous and her "an infidel, and a sinner". However, Lootah said that none of her advice in the book violated the teachings of the Qur'an and that the book was published after the Mufti of Dubai had given an approval, even though he warned her that "Arab readers might not be ready for such a book".

Lootah wrote in her book that many men had their first sexual experiences in Muslim countries with strict gender segregation, which she said negatively affected their sex life in marriage later. In her interview with The New York Times, Lootah commented that "many men who had anal sex with men before marriage want the same thing with their wives, because they don't know anything else. This is one reason we need sex education in our schools."

Lootah has been working as a marriage counselor at the Family Guidance section in the Dubai Courthouse since its opening in 2001. As of 2009, she remained the only female counselor there. Her Top Secret was the first sexual guidebook published in the United Arab Emirates.

== Selected publications ==
- Top secret : principles and etiquette of an intimate marital relationship (or Top Secret: Sexual Guidance for Married Couples), 272 pages, Dubai, Dubai Library Distribution, 2010. OCLC 798367504
