= Islamic marital jurisprudence =

Body of Islamic law surrounding marriage contracts

In Islamic law (sharia), marriage (Arabic: نكاح, romanized: nikāḥ) is a legal and social contract between a man and a woman. Numerous hadiths support marriage, though their specific recommendations vary depending on individual circumstances and can accordingly require, encourage, discourage or forbid a Muslim from marrying.

A nikah marriage has several requirements and restrictions under shariah, including a gift known as a mahr, free, uncoerced and legal consent from the bride, groom, and the bride's guardian (wali) and the presence of two legal witnesses from each side to the signing or accepting of the contract. Marriage between individuals of the same gender or close relatives, including parents, siblings, aunts, and uncles, is forbidden. Cousins (including first cousins) are allowed to marry. Polyandry is prohibited for women, and men are not allowed to have more than four wives at any one time.

== Outlook on marriage ==
Marriage is a strongly encouraged practice in Islam. Muslims are obligated (fard) to marry if they can afford it and fear falling into temptation, have a desire for sexual intercourse and are afraid they might indulge in fornication. It is only recommended (mustahabb) where the individual does not fear committing a forbidden act. Where an individual suffers from madness, leprosy, genital disease, lack of sexual desire or similar afflictions, it is prohibited (haram), unless they inform the other party first.

Celibacy is not generally recommended. Some scholars regard a man who has married as having "fulfilled half of the religion", with men with the "largest number of wives" being considered "the best people of the Muslim Ummah." Fiqh considers marriage a farḍ al-'ayn or "absolute and individual obligation", regardless of their financial circumstances.

=== Istikhara in marriage ===
A Hadith recorded by Ibn Hibban suggests that the Prophet instructed that an engagement be kept secret until Istikhara is performed. Furthermore, before performing prayer, they should seek consultation (Istishara) and adopt the necessary practical measures found in the Hadith of Fatima bint Qais.

== Requirements and regulations ==
=== Organising marriages ===
==== Wali ====
Traditionally, marriages are arranged by families for their children. A wali is a "custodian", "protector" or guardian. The walī mujbir (وَلِي مُجْبِر) has "full power to endorse a marriage on behalf of everyone under his care." Their oversight protects women from the "desires of the ill-hearted and evil opportunists" within the rights and independence that Islam grants her. In most schools of Islamic law, only the bride's father or paternal grandfather can take on this role. In the absence of either, other male relatives, such as the bride's brother, uncle, or even a male guardian appointed by a shariah court or the imam of a mosque, may be allowed to act in this capacity.

The importance of the wali, and whether one is needed to approve the marriage, is debated between the different schools of thought, and may vary depending on whether the bride is a virgin or minor. One sahih hadith states that a marriage entered into without the wali's permission is considered invalid. Another suggests that a bride's "over herself concerning marriage takes precedence" over her guardian's, and should he "persist in his refusal" to let her marry "someone who has a proper background", "the qadi is authorised to give her away" instead.

The wali's approval of the marriage of a woman who has not previously been married is strongly recommended in the Hanafi school, (Note: Marriage contracts for Hanafi Sunnis are signed between the bride and groom, not the groom and the wali. Therefore, the marriage of a "free, sane and adult" woman is valid without the approval of her wali if her husband is a "legal and suitable match" to her. Conversely, if he is not a legal match for her, her marriage is not valid.) and obligatory based on precaution in the Ja'fari school of Shia Islam. (Note: Some scholars claim that it is not obligatory where a girl is of age and sound mind, regardless of her virginity. Others maintain that the bride must be divorced, widowed or "completely independent in all her decisions" to be exempt from requiring the consent of her wali.) It is also considered compulsory in the Maliki, Shafi'i, and Hanbali schools of Sunni Islam,. It is unclear whether this requirement extends to divorced or widowed women as well. (Note: Some scholars state that such women are considered their own guardian and thus do not require a marriage contract. Others state they still fall under the purview of their wali.)

Women who believe their wali is unreasonably preventing them from marrying the man they wish to marry may "refer the matter to Islamic Scholars or Islamic Shariah councils and let a Mufti or a Scholar from a Shariah council".

==== Consent ====
The Hanafi and Hanbali schools of jurisprudence require a bride's consent for marriage if she has reached the age of puberty. According to Ibn Taymiyyah, silence stemming from a woman's "natural shyness" may be sufficient.

The Maliki and Shafi'i schools of jurisprudence allow compelled consent where the bride-to-be is a virgin. The former also permits the compulsion of minors.

=== Separation of the sexes ===
Among more orthodox Muslims, unnecessary direct conversation between the prospective bride and groom before the nikah is forbidden, just as it would be between any other two non-mahram individuals. (Note: A mahram is a family member with whom marriage would be considered permanently unlawful or haram.) Negotiations and marriage proposals are generally conducted through parents or guardians. While a prospective groom cannot be alone with his prospective bride before the marriage, he is allowed to see her. Some jurisprudential schools limit this to her hands and face. The Hanbali school is more permissive and also allows him to look at her head, neck, arms, feet and legs.

Kissing is also prohibited before the nikah. Some scholars argue that it is not permissible in public even after marriage, as Muslim couples are expected to exercise haya in such spaces as it can lead to an "unrestricted, carefree and immoral atmosphere which Islam forbids."

=== Mahr ===
Mahr Muajjal is a mandatory gift given by the groom mentioned in the Quran. Unlike a bride price, however, it is given directly to the bride and not to her father. While it is typically money, it can also be a house, property, or business that is put in her name and can be run and owned entirely by her if she chooses. Traditionally, it cannot be taken back after a divorce, unless she committed adultery.

According to fatwa given in Hanafi and Hanbali fiqh, Mahr Muajjal must be paid at the time of the nikah. The payment date can only be postponed if both the bride and groom agree.

Al-Mahr al-Musamma is a type of mahr whose amount is agreed upon by the couple and specified in their marriage contract. One manner of determining the amount is dependent on the amount the bride's older sisters were given at the time of their marriage. Alternatively, Al-Mahr al Mithli is set according to the "assets" of the woman, such as the number and nature of her family, her ethnic background, beauty and intelligence. The minimum amount varies depending on the school of jurisprudence relied upon. Maliki fiqh sets this at three dirhams while Hanafi fiqh has a higher threshold of ten dirhams, (Note: This equates to 30.615 grams of silver or approximately $2.72 as of 2025.) Shia fiqh has no minimum, but sets a maximum of 500 dirhams or $136.24.

Mahr Muakkar is given at the time of divorce or upon the husband's death.

=== Forbidden Actions ===
A prospective husband is forbidden from misrepresenting his suitability for marriage, including information regarding his lineage or physical status, to a woman or her wali. If he does and it is discovered, the bride has the right to nullify the nikah contract.

Muslims are forbidden from marrying a class of people known as their mahram according to a verse in Surah An-Nisa. This includes all first- and second-degree relatives, both biological and through marriage. Cousins, including first cousins, do not fall under this category.

Marriage between individuals of the same sex, those who have had the same woman breastfeed them (Note: Marriage to foster relations is not permitted. In Islam, such a relationship is formed by suckling from the breast of a wet nurse and the infant is regarded as having the same degree of affinity to her as in consanguinity. Thus, when the child grows up, they are prohibited from marrying those related to the wet nurse by the same degree as if to their own mother. Such "fosterage" does not happen by a chance suckling; it refers to the first two years of a child's life before they are weaned.) and polytheists.

=== Interfaith marriage ===
Islamic law traditionally forbids Muslim women from marrying non-Muslim men. It allows men to marry "chaste" women of the People of the Book (i.e. Jews, Christians and Sabians) "under specific conditions".

In the 21st century, however, marriages between Muslim women and non-Muslim men have become "more and more" frequent, meeting with "varying degrees" of acceptance. Some modern Islamic scholars have begun to reexamine and reinterpret this traditional Sharia interpretation to allow this. While these scholars use "established and approved methodologies" to reach their conclusions, they still face considerable opposition from the majority of orthodox Islamic scholars and interpreters, and are criticised for contravening the traditional Sunni understanding of ijma.

=== Polygyny ===
Muslim men are allowed to take up to four wives at a time. According to Yusuf Al-Qaradawi, the condition for such marriages is that the man must be able to equitably deal with all of his wives "in the matter of food, drink, housing, clothing and expenses, as well as in the division of his time." Men who are unable to do this are prohibited from practising polygyny.

The Hanbali and Shaafi'i schools of jurisprudence recommend that a Muslim male take only one wife to ensure his duties to her are fulfilled. Other scholars inveigh against banning or discouraging polygyny on "restrictive, impractical" Western norms.

Women are not allowed to have more than one husband. One of the main reasons for this would be the potential questioning of the paternal lineage of any children they have.

=== Western practices ===
Civil marriages in Western countries must meet "the basic conditions of Shari'ah" to be valid in Islam. Muslims are discouraged from following practices originating from European culture, such as wedding rings and bridal gowns, as it is an "imitation of the peculiar customs of the kafir" and is a form of shirk.

Men are also forbidden from wearing gold.

== Islamic marriage ceremony ==
=== Witnesses ===
Sunni Islam requires two Muslim witnesses, who are of sound mind and have reached the age of puberty, from both sides to be present at the time of the marriage for the contract to be valid. The Hanafi school of jurisprudence states that both of these witnesses must be "trustworthy and pious" men. On the groom's side, three witnesses are required if two male ones are unavailable.

In Shia Islam, witnesses are not required (wajib) but are recommended (mustahabb) instead.

=== Nikah/Islamic marriage contract ===
If the conditions are met and a mahr and contract are agreed upon, an Islamic marriage ceremony, or wedding, can take place. A muslim marriage contract is a legal agreement, affirmed both verbally and in writing, that either party can stipulate conditions within, which, when violated, grant the partner who included the clause the legal grounds to seek divorce.

A marriage requires an offer or proposal, known as an "ijab", from the bride's wali (or the person who is acting in his place) to the groom. Fiqh requires an indication of agreement from both the bride and groom following this. Traditionally, they repeat the word "Qubool" three times to achieve this. The contract is then signed, and the couple are considered married.

A Shia nikah ceremony requires the recitation of the Nikah Kalma and specific Quranic verses, as well as the couple to conduct a ghusl bath. (Note: Traditions around how the Nikah is performed tend to differ because different groups accept different texts as authoritative. For example, Sunni Muslims generally accept the hadith of Muhammad al-Bukhari, while Shia Muslims follow the Furu al-Kafi.) Sunni ceremonies do not require this and are thus shorter in length.

=== Walima ===
The walima is a dinner hosted by the groom's side of the family to celebrate and welcome the bride to the family. It is a "strongly recommended" sunnah traditionally held as soon as possible after the nikah. The newly married couple is generally seated together discreetly, as it is considered 'makruh' to display the bride on a stage.

The Walima can include speeches, sermons, prayers, and poetry. Scholars recommend the playing of the Daf drum during the Walima, despite music being otherwise prohibited.

== Types of marriage ==
=== Nikah ===
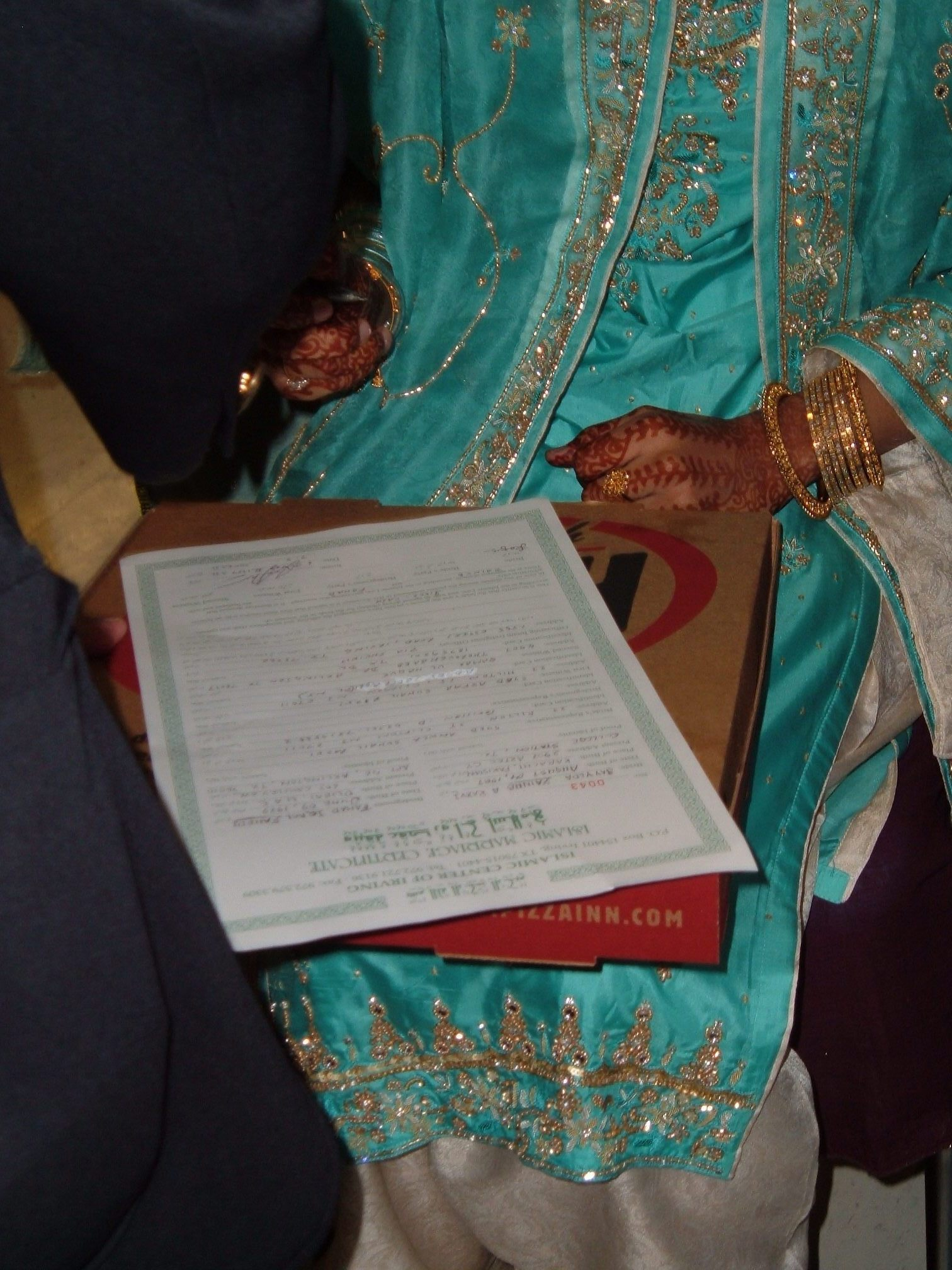
A Muslim bride signing the nikkah nama or marriage certificate, 2006, Pakistan.

Nikah is the most common form of marriage for Muslims described in the Quran. It requires a legal contract that must, at minimum, be orally agreed to. It allows both parties to inherit from one another.

While it is intended to be permanent, the husband can terminate the marriage through talaq, or the wife can seek a khula. In Shia jurisprudence, the contract may also specify an end date.

==== Nikah misyar ====
It is a type of nikah for Sunni Muslims carried out via the normal contractual procedure. It specifies several rights that the couple give up through their own free will, such as living together, equal division of nights between wives in cases of polygamy, and the wife's right to housing and maintenance money.

==== Nikah 'urfi ====
It is a "customary" marriage that commonly requires a wali and witnesses but is not officially registered with state authorities. It may be recorded in writing, on a cassette tape or through other forms of documentation. Such marriages are considered valid if all the crucial elements of a nikah are satisfied.

==== Nikah mut'ah ====
It is a private, verbal and temporary marriage practised by Twelver Shia Muslims, where the duration of the marriage is specified and agreed upon in advance. A declaration of intent to marry and an acceptance of the terms are required as in other forms of marriage in Islam.

There is no universally agreed minimum or maximum duration of such a marriage. The Oxford Dictionary of Islam suggests durations of at least three days, three months or a year.

==== Proxy marriages ====
Nikah by proxy (i.e. via the telephone or video link) is permitted so long as both parties or the representatives on their behalf exchange the required declarations. This has caused issues in Western countries, such as the United Kingdom, which do not view such marriages as legitimate.

==== Nikah halala ====
It is a practice in which a woman, after being divorced by her husband through triple talaq, weds another man, consummates the marriage and then gets divorced again to marry her former husband. Though it is practised by a small minority of muslims in countries that recognise triple talaq, this form of marriage is generally considered haram.

=== Forbidden historical marriages ===
==== Levirate marriage ====
In pre-Islamic Arabia, a son could inherit his deceased father's other wives, not including his own mother, as his own. The Quran forbids this practice due to its "shameful, despicable and evil nature."

==== Nikah ijtimaa ====
It was a form of combined marriage that existed in pre-Islamic Arabia. Through it, multiple men would have intercourse with a woman, and if she bore a child, she would choose one of the men to be the father of the child. This was outlawed by Islam, which requires men and women to be married before engaging in intercourse.

==== Nikah shighār ====
It is a prohibited form of marriage that allows men to exchange their daughters, sisters or mahram for marriage without paying mahr.

==== Nikah istibdaa ====
It was a form of marriage in which the husband would send his wife to have sexual relations with a man of noble lineage. He would refrain from intercourse with his wife until she became pregnant by the other man and then claim paternity of the conceived child. This was done to produce a child of noble breeding.

== Behaviour within marriage ==
=== Spousal rights and obligations ===
Islam advocates a role-based relationship where the husband is primarily responsible for financial maintenance and the wife for the care of children. Works on Islamic marriage often state that couples should display virtues such as "tranquillity, love and mercy", "patience", "kindness and mutual respect" and "understanding and aiming to please Allah", to one another.

Dua of wedding night

Dua during ejaculation

=== Gender roles ===
The Quran asserts that there are innate differences between women and men, and therefore Islam gives different rights and duties to each individual in a marriage. A husband owes his wife the payment of dowry, financial support, kind and proper treatment, privacy, equitable treatment (in polygamous marriages) and the defence of her honour. Conversely, a wife owes her husband acceptance of his role as leader of the household, obedience (unless his order violates Islam or her rights), marital relations when he wants and gratitude for his efforts.

==== Obedience ====
The Shafi'i school of fiqh considers a wife's obedience to her husband obligatory even if she supports herself by working full-time. On the other hand, the Hanafi school only requires her to obey to the extent that "preserves the stability of her family and marital life" or "is equitable."

Ruqayyah Waris Maqsood qualifies this requirement, stating the man must "show the protection, the maintenance, and the strength" to receive a wife's "obedience and the co-operation."

==== Physical discipline ====
Verse 4:34 of the Quran allows husbands to "discipline" their wives. This has been taken to mean "striking", "scourging" or disciplining "gently", which has led to the section being called the "Wife Beating Verse".

Some scholars argue that the word 'darb', which is used in the Quran, has multiple meanings. While it can refer to beating, another translation could be "taking measures of discipline and reconciliation" or "a non-violent, symbolic gesture".

Schools of fiqh that do not deny that the verse calls for physical violence emphasise that beatings must not be severe. Zakir Naik states that they cannot leave a mark on the wife. Bilal Philips claims that it "must be light" and not on the face.

==== Living with in-laws ====
The wife has the right to live in separate accommodation with her husband and children if she does not want to share it with her in-laws or relatives. This is the view of most Hanafi, Shafi'i and Hanbali scholars of fiqh. A man is, however, considered the "guardian of his father's property", so a wife should not object to her husband looking after his parents' affairs.

==== Sexuality ====
In Islam, sexual intercourse is limited to marital relationships between men and women and those between enslaved women and their owners. Chastity and modesty are highly encouraged, despite celibacy being discouraged. Adultery is strictly forbidden.

Marital relations of an anal nature, as well as intercourse during daytime fasting and menstruation, are forbidden.

== Divorce ==
There are various forms of divorce in Islamic law. The main categories include talaq (repudiation), khul (mutual divorce) and faskh (dissolution of marriage before the Religious Court). Historically, the official rules of divorce have differed between the legal schools. Today, in Muslim-majority states, personal status (family) laws have been codified, and control over divorce norms has shifted from traditional jurists to the state, but have generally remained "within the orbit of Islamic law".

== Iddah ==
A woman cannot marry for a period after a divorce or her husband's death, known as iddah (or iddat). A marriage contracted by a woman during this period is not valid in Islam.

The primary purpose of it is to determine whether the woman is pregnant, and thus accordingly allocate the paternity of any child born to her after her husband's death or the dissolution of her marriage. Another reason it is practised is to observe a respectful duration of mourning if her husband has died. The exact duration varies depending on a woman's situation and the school of fiqh setting it. It is typically:

- Three menstrual cycles for a divorcée who is still menstruating, regardless of how long that takes.
- Three lunar months for a divorcée who is either too young or too old to menstruate.
- Three months and ten days for divorcées who have reached menopause.
- Till the end of a pregnancy, whether by delivery, abortion or miscarriage, for a pregnant divorcée or widow.
- Four lunar months and ten days for a widow who is too young or too old to menstruate.

There are other rules for women carrying twins, or if the husband dies while the wife is observing the iddah due to a divorce.

== See also ==
- Marriage in Islam
- Islamic marital practices
- Beena – a form of marriage used in pre-Islamic Arabia
- Concubinage in Islam
- Islamic views on slavery
- The Sermon for Necessities
- Women in Islam
- Salat al-Istikharah - A prayer for seeking decisions from Allah, also observed for decision making in choosing spouse in marriage

== Sources and further reading ==
- Ali, Kecia (2010). Marriage and Slavery in Early Islam. Harvard University Press. ISBN 978-0-674-05059-4.
- Philips, Abu Ameenah Bilal; Jones, Jamila (2005) [1994]. Polygamy in Islam (PDF). International Islamic Publishing House.
- al-Sadlaan, Saalih ibn Ghaanim (1999). The Fiqh of Marriage in the Light of the Quran and Sunnah. Covering the Dower, Wedding Night, Wedding Feast, and Rights of the Husband and Wife (PDF). Zarabozo, Jamaal al-Din M (translator). Kalamullah.com.
- Maqsood, Ruqaiyyah Waris (1995). The Muslim Marriage Guide (PDF). allIslamforall.org.
