= Baligh =

Reached maturity/adulthood in Islamic jurisprudence

In Islamic legal terminology, bāligh (Arabic: بالغ, adult) or mukallāf (Arabic: مكلف, responsible) or muhallāq (Arabic: محلاق, tendril, mentally matured) or murāhiq (Arabic: مراهق, adolescent) or muhtalim (Arabic: محتلم, pubescent) refers to someone who has reached maturity or puberty, and has full responsibility under Islamic law.

== Quran ==
The Qur'an refers to puberty in verses 6:152; 12:22; 17:34; 18:82: 22:5; 28:14; 40:67: 46:15 and 3 times in chapter 24 An-Nur (31, 58, 59), where reference is made to a prepubescent child's unawareness of sexual matters, which allows him or her to be with an adult whose state of dress would preclude more mature individuals from being present. One includes children who have not reached puberty in a list of those before whom woman may adopt a more relaxed standard of dress than what is normally stipulated in the verse 31 of An-Nur (24:31). The other makes a distinction between children who have reached puberty and those who have not, with the latter having access to parents who might be in a state of undress.

"Oh believers, your slaves and any who have not yet reached puberty should ask your permission on three occasions—before the dawn prayer; when you take off your clothes in the noon heat; and after the evening prayer. These are the three times you are undressed. During other times, neither you nor they should be blamed if you interact with one another freely. In this way God makes clear the revelation for you—God knows and is wise. When your children attain puberty, they should ask for your permission like those before them did. In this way God makes clear His revelation for you-God knows and is wise"

— Quran, An-Nur, 24:58-59

== Hadith ==
Before the age of puberty, a person's faults and crimes are not generally considered as irrevocable according to the hadith. According to another hadith, at starting puberty, the recording angels start recording bad deeds such as missing regular prayers. Prophet of Islam Muhammad told Muslims to order seven-year-old children to pray, (gently) tap them if they refuse to pray at the age of ten, and to separate their bed then. In another hadith of Abu Dawood, Muhammad also said, bathing is obligatory in the weekend day of Jumuah prayer (Friday) for every male who reached puberty.

== Jurisprudence ==
In Islam, human life is divided into two parts, the first is before adolescence or childhood, when man is considered innocent, and the second is after adolescence (bulugiyat) or adulthood, when the Islamic law is fully applied to man and the hereafter is judged. If a person dies before he becomes an adult, he is considered to be in heaven.

According to Islamic jurists, human irads or niyah or qasd or free will, aqal or ability to judge right and wrong, and courage are formed before the age of puberty (Tamyiz) and between the age of puberty, and after the age of puberty (Taklif), his intellect (Aql), that is, wisdom and judgment, attains perfection. Therefore, from childhood, that is, before the age of seven, the child is taught the Kitab (knowledge), adab, ibadah, and taharat, because at this time the child is easily fit to receive education.

== Lifespan ==
According to Abu Hanifa and Shafi'i, the minimum age for puberty in boys is approximately 12 lunar years (approximately 11 years 7 months in solar years used internationally), and in the absence of symptoms, approximately 15 lunar years to a maximum of 18 lunar years may be considered, or may vary by geographical region; in the case of boys, the characteristics or signs of puberty, pubic hair growth and semen discharge (wet dreams). The minimum age of puberty for girls is approximately 9 lunar years (approximately 8 years and 8 months in solar years) and if no symptoms are found, it can be considered as approximately 15 lunar years to maximum 17 or 18 lunar years, or may vary by geographical region. The characteristics or signs of puberty in girls are pubic hair, menstruation, wet dreams and the ability to conceive.

However, according to Al-Nawawi, the age of 15 lunar year is self-evident for both boys and girls to become full adults.

== In marriage ==
In Islamic legal terminology, baligh refers to a person who has reached maturity, puberty or adulthood and has full responsibility under Islamic law. Legal theorists assign different ages and criteria for reaching this state for both males and females. For women, baligh or balaghat in terms of sexual maturity is manifested by menses. However, only after a separate condition called rushd, or intellectual maturity to handle one's own property, is reached can a girl receive her bridewealth.

== See also ==
- Islam and children
- Ibadah
- Islamic family jurisprudence
