= Abdul Khaleq Alghanem =

Saudi Arabian film director (1958–2021)

Abdul Khaleq Alghanim
- Born: 1958; Iraq
- Died: 18 May 2021 (aged 62–63); Dammam, Saudi Arabia
- Occupation: Film director
- Years active: 1990–2021
- Children: Wafi, Mohammed, Basmah, Bader, Basim

Abdul Khaleq Alghanem (Arabic: عبد الخالق الغانم; 1958 – 18 May 2021) was a Saudi Arabian film director.

== Career ==
Alghanem started his directing career by directing film series Rehlat Alsaid in 1992. He was the director of most episodes of the well-known Saudi film series Tash ma Tash. In 2002, he appeared as an actor in the series Shwaya Melh, which he also directed.

== Selected filmography ==
- Tash ma Tash (1993–2011)
- Snab Shaf (2017)
- Shad Balad (2016)
- Anber 12 (2013)
- Win or lose (2012)
- min alaakhir (2012)
- Bullish bearish (2012)
- Magadif El Amal (2005)

== Death ==
On 18 May 2021, he died in King Fahad Specialist Hospital Dammam, after suffering from prostate cancer for the last five years of his life.
