= Najis =

State of ritual uncleanliness in Islam

In Islamic law, najis (Arabic: نجس) means ritually unclean. According to Islam, there are two kinds of najis: the essential najis which cannot be cleaned and the unessential najis which become najis while in contact with another najis.

Contact with najis things brings a Muslim into a state of ritual impurity (Arabic: نجاسة najāsa, in opposition to ṭahārah, ritual purity). Ritual purification is then required before religious duties such as regular prayers are performed.

== Islamic law ==
According to Al-Sayyid Ali Al-Husseini Al-Sistani, the following things are najis intrinsically: urine, faeces, semen, corpse, blood, dog, pig, disbeliever (kāfir), wine and the sweat of an excrement-eating animal.

According to the Shafi'i school of Sunni Islamic jurisprudence, as systematised by Al-Nawawi in his book Minhadj, the following things are najis: wine and other spirituous drinks, dogs, swine, blood, excrements, and the milk of animals whose meat is forbidden by Islam. Spirituous drinks are not impure according to the Hanafi school, while living swine and dogs are not impure according to the Malikis. There is a difference of opinion as to whether alcoholic drinks are najis.

To the list of impure things enumerated by al-Nawawi, Shi’a jurists traditionally add dead bodies and non-believers.

Additionally, meat of any animal which is killed in a manner other than that prescribed by Islam is najis.

Najis things cannot be purified, in contrast to things which are defiled only (mutanajis), with the exception of wine, which becomes pure when made into vinegar, and of hides, which are purified by tanning.

== Muṭahhirāt ('purifying agents') ==
It is possible to purify a thing which has become najis. These muṭahhirāt agents that can purify najis can be divided into three groups:

=== The mutahirat ===
- the Earth
- the Sun
- Water – The Qur'an says: "He [Allah] is the one who sends the winds as good news before His mercy; and We send down pure water from the cloud." (25:48) According to the shari'ah, water can be of two types: muṭlaq and muḍāf. Muṭlaq is pure water without putting it to a scientific test. The five forms of muṭlaq are the following: rain, well water, running or flowing water (river or stream), kur water (lake, sea or ocean), and less than kur. Muḍāf is diluted water

=== Physical change ===
- istiḥālah (chemical change)
- inqilāb (change in properties)
- intiqāl (change in place)
- zawāl li-ʿayni n-najāsah (disappearance of the source of najāsah)
- istibrāʾ (quarantining)

=== Spiritual change ===
- Islam
- tabaʿīyyah (following)
- ghaybat al-muslim (absence of a Muslim)

Not all of these agents can purify every najis. However, among the agents water is the most universal purifying agent while the other agents are limited.

== Sources of law ==
The notions of ritual impurity come mainly from the Qur'an and ahadith. Swine and blood are declared forbidden food in the Qur'an.

== See also ==
- Ghusl
- Taher
- Ritual purification
- Wudu
- Dhimmi
