= Ritual purity in Islam =

Essential aspect of Islam

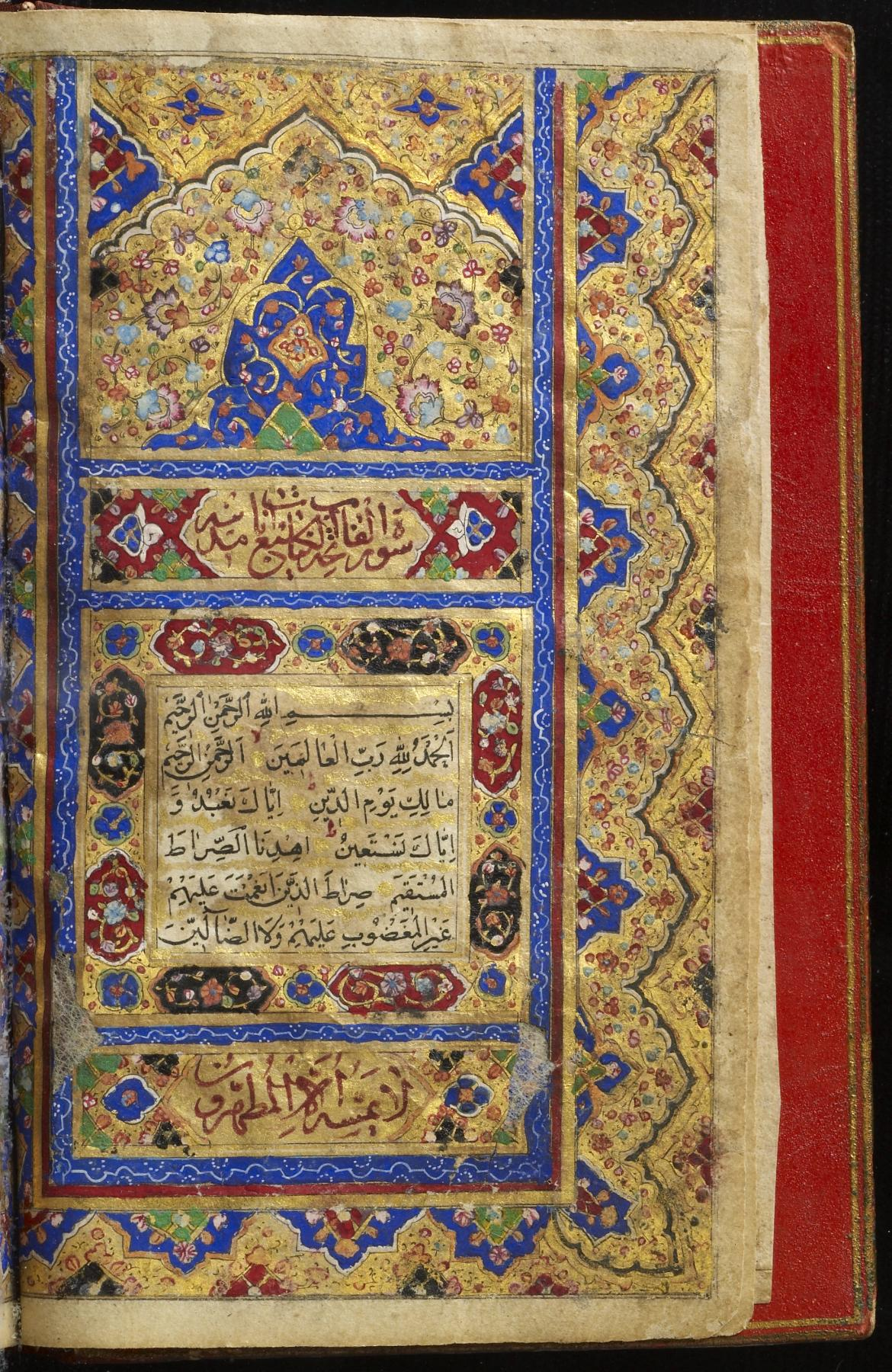
Indian print of the Sura Al Fatiha in Mughal India, underneath it is printed "Do not touch unless ritually pure", 17th century.

Purity (Arabic: طهارة, romanized: ṭahārah) is an essential aspect of Islam. It is the opposite of najāsa, the state of being ritually impure. It is achieved by first removing physical impurities (for example, urine) from the body, and then removing ritual impurity through wudu (usually) or ghusl.

== In the Quran ==
The Quran says: "In it there are men who love to observe purity and Allah loves those who maintain purity."^{[Quran 9:108]} and there is one verse which concerned with taharah or purity, and impurity of humans: "O you who have believed, indeed the polytheists are unclean, so let them not approach al-Masjid al-Haram after this, their [final] year. And if you fear privation, Allah will enrich you from His bounty if He wills. Indeed, Allah is knowing and wise."^{[Quran 9:28]}

== Shia views ==
Ayatollah Ali al-Sistani does not believe in the impurity of People of the Book (Jews, Christians, and Zoroastrians).

Some scholars such as Mohsen Fayz Kashani (d. 1680) and Sulayman ibn Abdullah Mahuzi (d. 1708) did not believe in the impurity of non-believers, and particularly non-People of the Book. Kashani believes that the impurity of kuffar is spiritual and internal, so there is no need to wash after touching them. This group believes in the purity of non-Muslims and of all humans. Mohammad Ebrahim Jannaati, Mohammad Hussein Fadlallah (d. 2010), Mostafa Mohaghegh Damad, Kamal Haydari, and Reza Hosseini Nassab are part of this group.

Ayatollah Ruhollah Khomeini said that all non-Muslims, including People of the Book, are impure.

== Sunni views ==
Sunni Islam has its own hygienical jurisprudence. It is preferable for a Sunni Muslim to remove the hair directly below the navel and under the arms also as trimming the nails once a week. Leaving hair and nails is permissible after 15 days and disliked after 40 days. The best day for removing needless hair and cutting nails is Friday. It is permissible to use shaving cream to remove needless hair. Needless hair and nails should be buried to prevent illnesses from spreading. Cutting eyebrows is permissible if they are too long. Sunni women should put their nails and hair removed from below the navel, and under the arms in a place where no non-permissible men can see it.

Personal grooming is also a matter of focus in Islam, and comprises all the ritual purity practices of prophets known as fitra. Allowing a beard to grow while trimming the moustache is emphasized with it being seen as mandatory by some respected Sunni scholars from the 4 major Sunni schools of jurisprudence.

== Hygienical jurisprudence ==
Islamic hygienical jurisprudence includes a number of regulations involving cleanliness during salat (obligatory prayer) through wudu (partial ablution) and ghusl (full ablution), as well as dietary laws and toilet etiquette for Muslims. The fiqh (Islamic jurisprudence) is based on admonitions in the Quran for Muslims to be ritually clean whenever possible, as well as in hadith literature (words, actions, or habits of the Islamic prophet Muhammad).

Cleanliness is an important part of Islam, including Quranic verses that teach how to achieve ritual cleanliness. Keeping oral hygiene through cleaning the teeth with the use of a form of toothbrush called miswak is considered sunnah, the way of Muhammad. Ritual ablution is also very important, as observed by the practices of wudu, ghusl, and tayammum (water-free alternative using any natural surface such as rock, sand, or dust).

In Muslim-majority countries, bathrooms are often equipped with a bidet. This ablution is required in order to maintain ritual cleanliness. The common Muslims practice of taking off shoes when entering mosques and homes is also based on ritual cleanliness.

== Hygienical practices ==
=== Dietary laws ===
Islamic dietary laws provide a set of rules as to what Muslims eat in their diet. These rules specify the food that is halāl, meaning lawful. They are found in the Quran, usually detailing what is unlawful, or harām.

=== Genital hygiene ===
Removal of pubic hair and armpit hair is prescribed by the sunnah, and is listed among the ritual purity practices known as fitra.

Urine is forbidden to be on a Muslim during prayer times, as it is considered impure. The foreskin is a possible spot where urine and other impurities (smegma) can accumulate. Circumcision is used to prevent this.

=== Toilet etiquette ===
The Islamic faith has particular rules regarding personal hygiene when going to the toilet. This code is known as Qaḍāʾ al-Ḥājah (قضاء الحاجة).

Issues of laterality, such as whether one uses the left or right hand and the foot used to step into or out of toilet areas, are derived from hadith sources. The only issue which the Qur'an mentions is the one of washing one's hands especially after using the toilet which is mentioned in Quran 5:6.

Examples of these rules include, but are not limited to:

- It is strongly discouraged to relieve oneself into still water.
- It is preferable to step into the bathroom with the left foot and step outside the bathroom with the right foot.
- One should remain silent whilst on the toilet. Talking, answering greetings or greeting others is disliked.
- One should not face nor turn one's back on Qibla (the direction Muslims face to pray) whilst relieving oneself.
- When leaving the toilet one should say, "O Allah! Bestow your forgiveness upon me."
- Use of toilet paper is acceptable, but washing with water is still needed for purity and to minimize germs present in feces from touching the skin.

=== Sexual hygiene ===
Sexual hygiene in Islam is a prominent topic in Islamic jurisprudence (fiqh) due to its everyday nature. Ibn Abidin, a 13th century Hanafi Islamic scholar explains:

When there is discharge of thick, cloudy white fluid (wady) (that exits before or after urinating) or unlustful discharge of thin, sticky, white fluid (madhy) caused by play or kissing, it requires washing the private parts and wudu.

Regarding things that necessitates ghusl:

1. sperm or female ejaculate that leaves its place of origin with desire [f: whether actual or effective], even if it exits the body without desire, even if without sexual intercourse;
2. the head of the penis entering either private part of a living human being who is fit for sexual intercourse, even without any release of sexual fluids…”

After partaking in sexual activity where penetration or ejaculation occurs, both men and women are required to complete a full-body ritual ablution known as ghusl in order to re-establish ritual purity before prayer. Ghusl requires clean, odorless water that has not been used for a previous ritual and begins with the declaration of the intention of purity and worship. A Muslim performing complete ablution then washes every part of his or her body.

== See also ==
- Al-Baqara 255
- Etiquette
- Ghusl
- Hygiene in Christianity
- Istinja
- Junub
- Medicine in medieval Islam
- Najasah
- Tahir
- Tayammum
- Wudu
- Tumah and taharah
