= Fahd Al-Hayyan =

Saudi Arabian actor (1971–2023)

Fahd Al Hayyan
- فهد الحيان
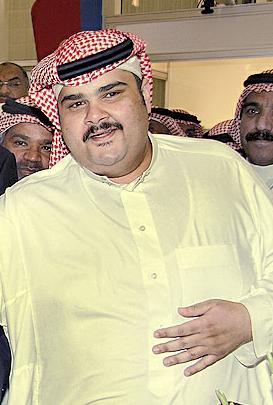
- Al-Hayyan in 2009
- Born: 22 March 1971; Saudi Arabia
- Died: 15 May 2023 (aged 52)
- Occupation: Actor
- Years active: 1994–2023

Fahd bin Muhammad bin Nasser Al-Hayyan (Arabic: فهد بن محمد بن ناصر الحيان; 22 March 1971 – 15 May 2023) was a Saudi Arabian actor, who started his career in 1991. He was mostly known for his various roles in the Saudi comedy Ghashamsham and Tash ma Tash.

Al Hayyan died on 15 May 2023, at the age of 52 due to weight complications.

== Acting works ==
- Tash ma Tash (for several years)
- Ghashamsham during Ramadan (2006-2011)
