= Ghashamsham =

Ghashamsham (Arabic: غشمشم) is a Saudi comedy program starring Fahd Al-Hayyan that was shown on the MBC channel in the month of Ramadan, in September 2008.

== Story ==
A man named Rashid (Fahd Al-Hayyan) lives in a small town near Riyadh, Saudi Arabia. He marries his friend's sister and moves to Riyadh. First he works in the zoo, then he becomes the security officer of a small compound, later he becomes a clothing designer.
