= Badryah El-Bishr =

Saudi Arabian novelist (born 1967)

Badriah Al-Bishr
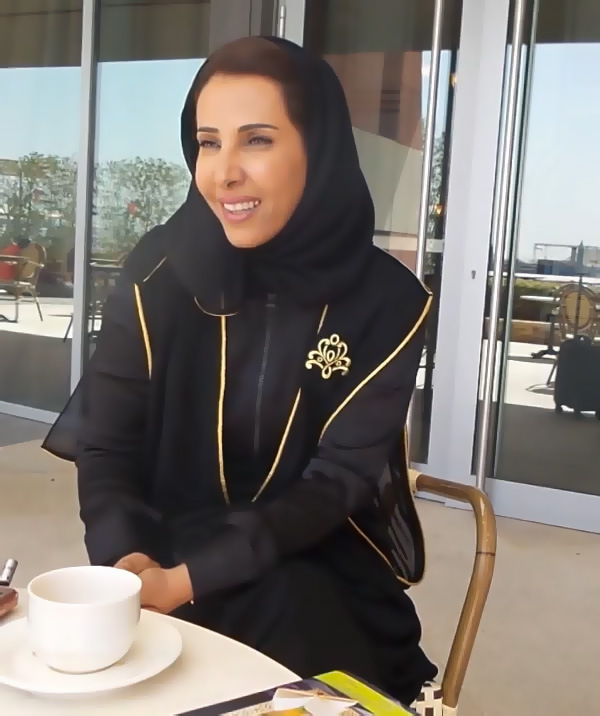
- Born: Badriah Abdullah Al-Bishr بدرية عبدالله البشر; 1967 (age 58–59)
- Occupations: Writer, novelist
- Spouse: Nasser Al Qasabi
- Children: 3

Badriah Al-Bishr (Arabic: بدرية البشر, born 1967 in Riyadh, Saudi Arabia) is a Saudi Arabian writer and novelist. She was born in Riyadh and obtained a bachelor's degree and master's degree from King Saud University and a PhD from the Lebanese University in 2005. She has taught at Al Jazeera University in Dubai. A weekly columnist at Al Yamama magazine since 1997, she won the prize for "best newspaper column" at the Arabic Press Awards in 2011, becoming the first woman to do so. She also writes regularly for Al Hayat newspaper.

El-Bishr has published three collections of short stories and three novels to date. The novels are

- Hind and the Soldiers (2005)
- The Seesaw (2010)
- Love Stories on al-Asha Street (2013)

Her latest novel Love Stories on al-Asha Street was longlisted for the 2014 Arabic Booker Prize.
