= Nasser Al Qasabi =

Saudi Arabian actor

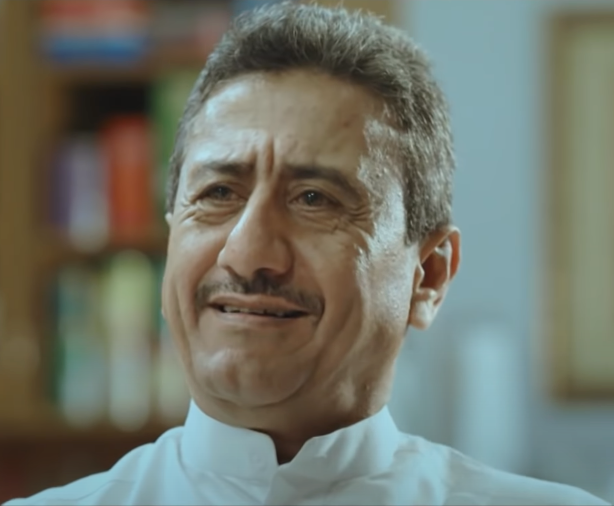
- Nasser in 2020
- Born: Nasser bin Qassim Al Qasabi ناصر بن قاسم القصبي; November 28, 1961 (age 64); Riyadh, Saudi Arabia
- Other name: Abu Rakan
- Education: King Saud University
- Occupations: Actor, comedian
- Years active: 1984–present
- Notable work: Tash ma Tash
- Spouse: Badryah El-Bishr

Nasser bin Qassim Al Qasabi (Arabic: ناصر بن قاسم القصبي, born 28 November 1961 in Riyadh, Saudi Arabia) is a Saudi Arabian actor. He started his acting career in 1984 and is known for his various roles in the series Tash Ma Tash (Arabic: طاش ما طاش).

He graduated from King Saud University in Riyadh. He began his acting journey in the university theater. He became famous alongside Abdullah Al-Sadhan for the comedy series Tash Ma Tash, which they both starred in for 18 seasons over two decades. The show is considered the most famous Saudi series and one of the best comedy series in the Gulf and the Arab world.

From 2012 to 2015, Nasser was a judge on the television show Arabs Got Talent, after Amro Adib withdrew from the program. Al Qasbi has featured in various shows including, a Saudi TV show satirising ISIL called Selfie during Ramadan for three seasons, from 2015 to 2017.

== Work ==
=== TV series ===
Year	Show Title
1981	Eyes Awaiting time
1987	The Meddler
1985	Wadi Al-Jarf
1985	The Return of Aswad
1986	Salloum's Dreams
1989	Eyes that Await Time
1990	The Beginning of the End
1990	Valley of the Gazelles
1991	Generations Conflict
1991	Short Tales
1992	Abu Mish'ab
1991	Daily Journal of a Delusion
1993	Yellow Card
1993-2023	Tash Ma Tash
1994	Life is all about Luck (No to Wives)
1994	The Lantern
1994	Innocent Eyes
1999	The Palace
2000	Popular Legends
2002	Stay with me 7
2002	A little Salt
2003	Father of Birds
2005	Black and White
2008	We Are All Village Kids
2009	37°C
2009	My Neighbor Hamoudah
2012	Tish Ayal (Cartoon Series)
2012	Rising Falling
2012	Wi-Fi - Comedy Show
2013	Abu Al-Millions
2013	Wi-Fi 2 - Comedy Show
2014	Wi-Fi 3 - Comedy Show
2014	The Arabs Land
2015	Selfie (Three Seasons)
2018	Al-Asouf
2019	Al-Asouf 2
2020	Makhraj 7
2021	No Entry
2022	Al-Asouf 3
2023	Tash The Comeback

=== Plays ===
Production Year	Title
1981	Al-Karmaniyah
1984	Dream of Life
1991	City of Fortunes
1994	The Sea Roosters
1984	Repeated Teacher
1985	Taq Taq Taqiya
1987	When the Hero Writes His Defeat
1993	The Actor's Guardian
1992	Qarmoush and Tartoush
1985	One Zero
1984	The Lost One
1985	Under the Chairs
1986	Saloom's Dreams
1987	Owais the Nineteenth
1988	The Return of Hamoud and Mohaymed
1989	The Son of the Village
2019	The Wolf in the well
2022	Regarding Some People

=== Films ===
Year	Title	Role	Notes
1985	Understand Me		
1986	Companions of the Road		
1987	Homed and Mohaimeed		
1988	Eqab and Shehana		
1990	My Brother and I		
1991	The Half Million Man		
2026	7 Dogs	General Nasser	

== Awards ==
- 2005: He was honored as one of the 43 most influential personalities in the Arab world by Newsweek magazine.
- 2019: Saudi Arabia - He was honored at the Entertainment Makers event in Riyadh.
