= Fahisha =

Islamic term for lewdness or indecency

Fahsha or fahsh/Fuhsh (Arabic: فُحْش, الفاحشة, فاحشة) is an Arabic word, commonly means lewdness and indecency.

== Terminology ==
According to Islamic scholars, there are two opinions about the meaning of fahsha:

- Either it is fornication and adultery (zina as Fahsha Mubin), as the Quran states,

And do not come near to adultery; surely it has been an obscenity (fahsha) and odious ways.

— Sura Isra (17:32)

- The second opinion is any bad deeds that deserves punishment such as stoning, killing, cutting a hand, etc.

The major sins included in fahsha are numerous. Islamic law considers as a major sin any act that the religion has warned Muslims against performing, or has promised harsh punishment for committing, or has prescribed a hadd for it. Examples of major sins are disbelieving in Allah (God in Islam) after having believed in Him, killing an innocent soul, dealing with riba (usury, interest), treating one's parents harshly, adultery, fornication, giving false testimonies, etc.

== Hadith ==
"When fahisha (sexual immorality/obscenity/adultery) spreads openly in a nation, there is an outbreak of disease in the form of plague epidemics. In addition, diseases arise which were not seen among people before."

— Sunan Ibn Majah, Hadith No. 4,019"

== How to avoid fahisha ==
The Qur'an says that prayer prevents fahsha and forbidden acts. In the Quran,

'(O Messenger!) The Book that has been revealed to you; recite from it and establish prayer (salah). Indeed, salah prevents one from indecency (fahsha) and evil deeds (munkar). And the remembrance of Allah is the best. Allah knows what you do (Surah Ankabut: Verse 45)
