= Mahram =

Non-marriageable kin in Islamic law

In Islam, a mahram (Arabic: مَحْرَمٌ) is a family member with whom marriage would be considered permanently unlawful (haram). A woman does not need to wear hijab around her mahram or spouse, and an adult male mahram or husband may escort a woman on a journey, although an escort may not be obligatory.

== Overview ==
=== People with whom marriage is prohibited ===
- permanent or blood mahrams include:
  - all direct ancestors
  - all direct descendants
  - siblings
  - siblings of parents, grandparents, and further antecedents
  - children and further descendants of siblings
- in-law mahrams with whom one becomes mahram by marrying someone:
  - all the ancestors of one's spouse
  - all the descendants of one's spouse
  - all who marry a direct ancestor
  - all who marry a direct descendant (A woman may marry her stepfather, but only if the stepfather has not consummated his marriage to her mother.)
- Rada or "milk-suckling mahrams" with whom one becomes mahram because of being nursed by the same woman:
  - foster mother
  - foster sibling

When a woman acts as a wet nurse (that is she breast feeds an infant that is not her own child for a certain amount of time under certain conditions), she becomes the child's rada mother. In English, these can be referred to as milk brother, milk-mother, and so on. For a man, mahram women include his mother, grandmother, daughter, granddaughter, sister, aunt, grandaunt, niece, grandniece, his father's wife, his wife's daughter (step-daughter), his daughter-in-law (if previously married to his biological son. She is not mahram if she was married to his adopted son), his mother-in-law, his rada mother and rada sister. According to the Islamic prophet Muhammad, "What is forbidden by reason of kinship is forbidden by reason of suckling."

These are considered mahram because they are mentioned in the Quran (An-Nisa 22–23):

22. Do not marry former wives of your fathers—except what was done previously. It was indeed a shameful, despicable, and evil practice. 23. ˹Also˺ forbidden to you for marriage are your mothers, your daughters, your sisters, your paternal and maternal aunts, your brother’s daughters, your sister’s daughters, your foster-mothers, your foster-sisters, your mothers-in-law, your stepdaughters under your guardianship if you have consummated marriage with their mothers—but if you have not, then you can marry them—nor the wives of your own sons, nor two sisters together at the same time—except what was done previously. Surely Allah is All-Forgiving, Most Merciful.

— Surah An-Nisa 4:22-23

All of the man's female relatives mentioned in these two verses are considered his maharim, because it is unlawful (haram) for him to marry them, except the wife's sister, whom he can marry if he divorces her sister, or if his wife dies. The notion of mahram is reciprocal. All other relatives are considered non-maharim.

=== Legal escorts of women during journey ===
A woman may be legally escorted during a journey by her husband, or by any sane, adult male mahram by blood, although an escort may not be required, including:

- her father, grandfather or other male ancestor
- her son, grandson or other male descendant
- her brother
- her uncle, great uncle, or uncle from a previous generation
- the son, grandson, or other descendant of her sibling

== Rules ==
=== Mahram ===
A Muslim woman's mahrams form the group of allowable escorts when she travels.

For a spouse, being mahram is a permanent condition. That means, for example, that a man will remain mahram to his ex-mother-in-law after divorcing her daughter.

== See also ==
- Baligh
- Chaperone (social)—an adult female escort for unmarried girls in Western European tradition, dueña in Spanish (anglicised duenna).
- Cousin marriage
- Dayyuth
- Ḥ-R-M
- Hijab
- Islamic marital jurisprudence
- Islamic sexual jurisprudence
- Prohibited degree of kinship
