= Haya (Islam) =

Concept of modesty in Islam

Haya (Arabic: حياء, romanized: Hayāʾ, roughly corresponding to "bashfulness", "decency", "modesty", "shyness") is an Arabic word that means "natural or inherent, shyness and a sense of modesty". In Islamic terminology, it is mainly used in the context of modesty. Haya encourages Muslims to avoid anything considered to be distasteful or abominable. Haya plays an important role in Islam, as it is one of the most important parts of Iman. The antonym of Haya in Arabic is badha'a (بذاءة, immodesty) or fahisha (فاحشة, lewdness or obscenity).

== Etymology ==
The word itself is derived from the word Hayat, which means "life". The original meaning of Haya refers to "a bad or uneasy feeling accompanied by embarrassment".

== Importance ==
Haya is important for Muslims and in Islamic cultures—for both men and women. In the Qur'an, verses explain how men and women should behave. According to the values of Haya, a man must control himself by marrying as young as feasible. If a man cannot afford to marry, then he should fast, in order for him not to be overtaken by his desires and the whispers of Shaytan. The values of Haya dictate that women must conceal themselves as well.

Say to the believing men that they should lower their gaze and guard their modesty: that will make for greater purity for them: and Allah is well acquainted with all that they do. And say to the believing women that they should lower their gaze and guard their modesty; that they should not display their beauty and ornaments except what (must ordinarily) appear thereof; that they should draw their veils over their bosoms and not display their beauty...

— Quran 24:30–31

== In scripture ==
=== In the Qur'an ===
The Qur'an mentions Haya twice:

Indeed, Allah is not shy to present an example—that of a mosquito or what is smaller than it. And those who have believed know that it is the truth from their Lord. But as for those who disbelieve, they say, "What did Allah intend by this as an example?" He misleads many thereby and guides many thereby. And He misleads not except the defiantly disobedient.

— Quran 2:26

Then one of the two women came to him walking with Haya (shyness). She said, "Indeed, my father invites you that he may reward you for having watered for us." When he came and related the story to him, he said, "Fear not. You have escaped from the wrongdoing people."

— Quran 28:25

=== In the Ahadith ===
Haya is mentioned often in hadith passages, where the word is used to express shyness, modesty, and decency.

Narrated by Abu Huraira (R): The Prophet Muhammad (Saw) said, "Faith (Belief) consists of more than sixty branches (i.e. parts). And Haya is a part of faith."

— Sahih Al-Bukhari Vol.1:9

Abdullah Bin Umar narrated that the Prophet, once passed by a man who was admonishing his brother regarding Hayaʾ saying: "You are too shy, and I am afraid that might harm you." On that, the Prophet: "Leave him, for Hayaʾ is (a part) of Faith" and in another narration, he said: "Hayaʾ does not bring anything except good."

— (Al-Bukhari)

Prophet Muhammad said: "Haya does not bring anything except good." (Bukhari)

The messenger of Allah said: "Indeed from the teachings of the first prophets which has reached you is, 'If you do not have shyness, then do as you please."

— Sahih Bukhari

The Prophet was "more bashful than a veiled virgin girl".

— (Al-Bukhari and Muslim)

Narrated on the authority of Anas bin Malik, the Prophet (saw) said: When lewdness is a part of anything, it becomes defective; and when haya is a part of anything it becomes beautiful.

— (Tirmidhi)

Abu Hurairah narrated that the Messenger of Allah said: "Al-haya is from faith, and faith is in Paradise. Obscenity is from torture, and torture is in the Fire."

— Tirmidhi, 2009

Abu Umamah narrated that the Messenger of Allah said: "Al-haya' and Al-'Iy are two branches of faith, and Al-Badha and Al-Bayan are two branches of Hypocrisy."

— Tirmidhi 2027

Prophet indicated: "Every way of life has an innate character. The character of Islam is haya." Or "Every Deen or religion has an innate character. The character of Islam is modesty (haya)."

— Abu Dawood, al-Muwatta)

The Prophet said: "I advise you to be shy toward God, the Exalted, in the same way, that you are shy toward a pious man from your people.

— Abu Dawood

The Prophet said: "God is more deserving than other people of shyness."

— Abu Dawood

'Allah, the Mighty and Sublime, is forbearing, modest and concealing, and He loves modesty and concealment...'"

— Sunan an-Nasa'i Vol. 1:406

Abdullah ibn Umar (Ra) narrated that the Prophet (saw) said: "Indeed haya (modesty) and Iman are Companions. When one of them is lifted, the other leaves as well."

— (Baihaqi)

Prophet (saws) said: "Haya and Trustworthiness will be the first to go from this world; therefore keep asking Allah for them."

— (Baihaqi)

== See also ==
- Islamic clothing
- Morality in Islam
- Outline of Islam
- Glossary of Islam
- Index of Islam-related articles
