= Polygyny in Islam =

Men having more than one wife in Islam

Traditional Sunni and Shia Islamic marital jurisprudence allows Muslim men to be married to multiple women (a practice known as polygyny)—up to four wives at a time under Islamic law—with the stipulation that if the man fears he is unable to treat more wives fairly he must marry only one. Marriage by a woman to multiple husbands (polyandry) is haram (forbidden).

Contemporary views on the practice vary. Some non-Muslim secularists think it is no longer socially useful and should be banned (Rasha Dewedar). Some hold that it should be allowed only in cases of necessity (Muḥammad ʿAbduh). Still others feel it is part of the Islamic marriage system and that denying it is tantamount to denying "the wisdom of divine decree" (Bilal Philips and Jamila Jones).

== Scriptural basis ==
The verse most commonly associated with the topic of polygamy is verse 3 of Surah 4 An-Nisa (Women). A translation by Abdullah Yusuf Ali as:

If you fear that you shall not be able to deal justly with the orphans, Marry women of your choice, Two or three or four; but if you fear that you shall not be able to deal justly (with them), then only one, or (a captive) that your right hands possess, that will be more suitable, to prevent you from doing injustice. (Q.4:3)

It is believed these verses were revealed after the Battle of Uhud, so that some (Alia Hogben) argue that these verses have been revealed "because of Allah's concern for the welfare of women and orphans who were left without husbands and fathers who died fighting for the Prophet and for Islam."

Others favoring this interpretation (Sunnipath), point out that the second part of verse Q.4:3 states "but if ye fear that ye shall not be able to deal justly (with them), then only one, or (captive women) that your right hands possess, that will be more suitable, to prevent you from doing injustice."

Other verses in the Quran that do not directly address the practice of polygyny by the faithful but discuss marriage generally, also have relevance to polygynous relationships.

== Opinions of classical Islamic scholars ==
=== Recommending monogamy ===
While traditional Islamic scholarship upholds the notion that Islamic law permits polygyny, it emphasizes the divine command to "marry only one" where the man fears being unable to fulfil the rights of two or more in a fair manner, so that a substantial segment of the Islamic scholarship (using ijtihad, independent legal reasoning) argues that it is preferable for men to refrain from multiple marriages in most circumstances.

This opinion has been codified into the official positions of the Hanbali and Shaafi’i schools of jurisprudence which assert that it is "recommended" (i.e. mandub, one of the categories of fiqh ruling – halal, haram, wajib, etc.) for a Muslim male to have only one wife, even if he may act equitably with more than one woman.

==== Hanbali School ====
Ibn Qudaamah from the Hanbali School of jurisprudence, said in Ash-Sharh Al-Kabeer: "It is more appropriate to marry only one wife. The author of Al-Muharrar [i.e. Abul Barakaat Al-Majd ibn Taymiyyah] said this, based on the saying of Allaah (which means) {...But if you fear that you will not be just, then [marry only] one}." [Ash-Sharh Al-Kabeer authored by Shams-ud-deen Ibn Qudaamah].

==== Shaafi’i School ====
"It is a Sunnah not to marry more than one wife if there is no apparent need." Ash-Shirbeeni from the Shaafi’i School of jurisprudence, [Mughni al-Muhtaj 4/207].

"Allah has permitted a man to marry up to four wives, saying: {...two or three or four...}, but Allah advised that it is desirable for man to marry only one wife, saying: {...But if you fear that you will not be just, then [marry only] one}". Al-Maawardi, from the Shaafi’i School of jurisprudence, [al-Hawi al-Kabir 11/417].

"It is fitter to confine oneself to just one". Imam Ahmed ibn Naqib al Masri, from the Shaafi’i School of jurisprudence, [Umdatu Salik].

"It does not call for two wives, [since] plurality may render life miserable and disrupt the affairs of the home." Imam Al-Ghazali, from the Shaafi’i School of jurisprudence, [Kitab al Nikah, Ihya Uloom ud Din].

Imam Shaafi’i, the founder of the Shaafi’i School of jurisprudence, offered an additional exegesis for the final clause of verse Q.4:3, which though usually interpreted as "that is more suitable that you may not incline to injustice", is better understood (Al-Shafi'i believed) as "that is more suitable that you may not be financially strained by numerous children"; his reasoning being that the verse had already listed fear of committing injustice as a reason to not wed more than once, hence it would be pointless for the same reason (for not wedding more than once) to be expounded twice in the same verse.

His alternative interpretation pursued the perception which held that the presence of a plurality of women in a man's conjugal life would produce undesirably large numbers of offspring, which could be a potential cause of financial hardship and poverty in the future.

Given the emphasis that Islamic law stipulates on the welfare of children and nurturing children with permitted means of income, Imam Shaafi’i opined that it was legislated for a man to marry just once as an increase in the population of a family due to multiple marriages could potentially harbour harmful monetary consequences for the man who marries more than once.

Ash-Shaafi’i is of the view that it is desirable to confine oneself to marrying only one although it is permissible for him to marry more than one. This is to avoid being unfair by being virilely incompetent, more inclined to some of them than others, or being unable to financially support them. [al-Hawi al-Kabir 11/417].

== Contemporary sources ==
=== Criticism of polygamy ===
==== Modernist criticism ====
Rasha Dewedar writes that after studying polygamy, early 20th century Modernist Muslim scholars such as Muhammad Abduh and Rashid Rida had concluded that polygamy was "an injustice to both women and children" for the following reasons:

- In most polygamous marriages men mistreat their wives and deny them their rights;
- Conflicts between the wives commonly spreads to tension among children;
- If an Islamic legal ruling has detrimental consequences, then according to the fundamentals of shari'a the ruling should be changed, based on the shari'a principle of “warding off evil takes precedence over bringing benefit". (Note: as stated in the hadith – "There should be neither harming (darar) nor reciprocating harm (dirar).")

Mistreatment of wives and tension among children being detrimental consequences, 'Abdu and Rida believed polygamy should only be allowed in cases of necessity. Another Modernist, Tahar Haddad, argued polygamy should be banned outright.

Dewedar herself argues that the verse most widely associated with polygyny (Q.4:3), was revealed after the Battle of Uhud and indicates that it must have been revealed "because of Allah's concern for the welfare of women and orphans who were left without husbands and fathers who died fighting for the Prophet and for Islam." Marriage was "the principal social protection system in that era" and a situation causing a big imbalance between the number of men and women could be remedied by polygamy.

==== Secular studies ====
At least some systematic reviews of scientific studies of women and/or children in polygynous families (not all Muslim) have found negative results for mental health.

- A 2012 systematic review of 22 mental health studies of polygynous women (not all Muslim) compared to monogamous women report a "higher prevalence of somatization, depression, anxiety, hostility, psychoticism and psychiatric disorder in polygynous wives as well as reduced life and marital satisfaction, problematic family functioning and low self-esteem."
- Another systematic literature review, this one of 13 papers published between 1994 and 2014 found "more mental health problems, social problems and lower academic achievement for children and adolescents from polygynous than monogamous families".
- A 2021 systematic review and meta-analysis of psychological impact of polygamous marriage on women and children in 23 studies found
  - "women in polygamous marriages had a 2.25 (95% CI: 1.20, 4.20) higher chance of experiencing depression (but not anxiety or distress, which were not found to be statistically significant) than in monogamous marriages."
  - Children with polygamous parents had "a significantly higher Global Severity Index with a mean difference of 0.21 (95% CI: 0.10, 0.33) than those with monogamous parents."

=== Defence of polygamy ===
Preacher Bilal Philips (Note: who holds a Ph.D. in Islamic Studies) and Jamila Jones, strongly support polygamy in Islam, particularly in the face of what they believe are "restrictive impractical" Western norms, and the "loud new cry" raised by "so-called Modernist Muslims" against polygamy and easy divorce in traditional Islam. Philips and Jones point out

- polygyny predates Islam,
- that Muhammad and most major Companions of him (whose example Muslims traditionally are urged to follow), practiced polygyny.

They further claim that

- worldwide the population of women exceeds the population of men (citing the statistic that in 1971 females made up 3% more of the population than males in the UK), (Note: males make up 48.55% of the population, and females 51.45% in the UK as of the 1971 census; However, data from 2025 is mixed, with one country, India, having 45,711,063 more males than females.) and that this surplus population of women "unable to fulfill their sexual and psychological needs" within the bounds of marriage, will lead to a weakening of the "western family structure";
- while no woman likes the idea of sharing her husband with another woman, Islamic law must give precedence to the general welfare and the Quran teaches that it is not possible to live without experiencing pain or tests from God, and that God's wisdom is superior to our opinions;
- it was only with the arrival of Western colonialism that Muslims began to question polygyny;
- the modernist criticism that polygamy is oppressive to women is wrong;
- men are more easily sexually aroused and have a higher rate of extramarital activity than women, and polygynous marriage has been, (and is), found outside of Westernized societies "with very few exceptions";
- when a husband grows apart in interests from his first wife or she loses her beauty and he becomes interested in a younger woman, polygyny allows for him to take another wife without upsetting "family unity".
- the claim of non-Muslim Western men that they practice monogamy and control their sexual urges is false; these men actually pursue extramarital relationships in violation of their vows. According to Philips and Jones, "the fact is that institutional polygyny is vehemently opposed by male-dominated Western society because it would force men to fidelity".

Similarly, Shia cleric Muhammad Rizvi argues that criticism of polygyny in Western countries is part of the post-9-11 attack on Islam, and that those same countries which make polygamy illegal also suffer from "rampant" adultery and would do well to embrace the "practical religion", known as Islam whose "laws are in line with human nature", and allow men to have up to four wives.

=== Jurisprudence on polygamy ===
An intermediate position between embracing polygamy and discouraging/banning it, is "adding conditions" to polygamous marriage. One condition in particular is requiring the consent of the first wife for the husband's taking another – the law in Egypt and several other countries. According to Islamic scholars giving fatwas on the issue, such consent is not required in Islamic law.

Some further comments made in fatwas on the subject are that: the husband should soften the blow with "good manners", "kindness" and however much money it takes to please the first wife, (The Standing Committee for Issuing Fatwas, Islam Online); the first wife may stipulate in the marriage contract that there be no additional wives and then get a divorce if the husband violates that agreement, and also that the husband should obey the laws of the country, ("English Mufti", Dar al-Ifta.org); that the first wives "should not let jealousy make them object to that which Allah has permitted", and that there is "no evidence ... either in the Quran or the sunnah", requiring their permission, (Muhammad Salih Al-Munajjid, Islam Question and Answer); that because of women's "innate jealousy", requiring consent is just be a way of eliminating what God has permitted (Haydar Husayn, Shiachat), (Bilal Philips) and, in fact, is "a result of colonial domination" (Bilal Philips). (Note: Many answers/fatwas by scholars indicate requiring the consent of the first wife for a second/third/forth wife is not allowed in Islam: No, but the husband should be nice about it and use "good manners and kindness" and "minimize the hurt feelings", discuss the matter with her "in a gentle and pleasant manner", and spend "whatever money may be necessary" to get her to accept of the situation. (The Standing Committee for Issuing Fatwas, Islam Online); No, the consent of the first wife to marry a second marriage is not required. If the wife doesn't like it she can ask for a divorce. Although the husband should obey the laws of the country ("English Mufti", Dar al-Ifta.org).; No, it is not obligatory for the husband, if he wants to take a second wife, to have the consent of his first wife. But the wife has the right to stipulate in the binding marriage contract that her husband must not marry another beside her, so that if the man marries another wife, she may either to obtain divorce or to stay with him as a co-wife (islamonline.net).; No, it is not obligatory for the husband. women will be jealous but they "should not let jealousy make them object to that which Allah has permitted". The first wife's acceptance is "a kind of cooperating in righteousness and piety". (Sheikh Muhammed Salih Al-Munajjid); No, there is "no evidence ... either in the Quran or the sunnah", requiring the permission of the first wife if her husband wishes to marry another wife. (Sheikh Muhammad Salih Al-Munajjid, Islam Question and Answer); No, it is not obligatory to ask the first wife for permission to marry a second wife, otherwise hardly anyone would be able to take a second wife (Haydar Husayn, Shiachat).; No. In fact, requiring the permission of the first wife, and similar conditions, as is required in Egypt and many Muslim countries, "are a result of colonial domination" and serve as a way to "negate the permission" to take up to four wives "given by God in the Quran", because "no woman in her right mind will give her husband permission to take a second wife". (Bilal Philips))

== Pre-Islamic context (jahiliyya) ==
Prior to the emergence of Islam, the Arabian Peninsula was characterized by a wide range of marriage practices— polygynous, polyandrous, monogamous, matrilineal-uxorilocal marriage (where the woman and her children remained with her tribe, and the man could visit or reside with her). (Note: Leila Ahmed states in her work, Women and Gender in Islam, "evidence suggests that among the types of marriage practiced was matrilineal, uxorilocal marriage, found in Arabia, including Mecca, about the time of the birth of Muhammad (c. 570) – the woman remaining with her tribe, where the man could visit or reside with her, and the children belonging to the mother's tribe – as well as polyandrous and polygamous marriages.") In polygynous marriages, it was common for there to be no restriction on the number of wives a man could have, and marriages, polygynous or otherwise, were purely contractual, with no sacred/religious element. Among tribal leadership, marriage tended toward polygyny with men marrying multiple wives from other powerful families for the express purpose of establishing relationships with them.

With the advent of the Qur'an and its teachings (particularly Quranic verse 3 of Surah 4), matrimony assumed a set of characteristics beyond those of the purely contractual, and men were limited to four wives.

How the establishment of polygyny in Islam as the only alternative to monogamy changed the social condition of women is disputed. Asghar Ali Engineer and some other scholars argue that "the position of women was ameliorated to a greater degree by the mission of Muhammad". Moulavi Chiragh Ali summarizes this view, stating,

"The Qur’an gradually improved and elevated the degraded condition of women [in the jahiliyya] by curtailing, in the first place, the unlimited number of wives to four...and, in the second place, declaring it impossible to deal equitably with more than one wife even if men 'would fain to do so,' and thus virtually abolishing polygamy."

Conversely, Leila Ahmed and like minded scholars argue that the arrival of Qur’anic law brought the loss of sexual autonomy for women. Whereas in jahiliyua, women were

"active participants, even leaders, in a wide range of community activities...their autonomy and participation were curtailed with the establishment of Islam, its institution of patrilineal, patriarchal marriage as solely legitimiate, and the social transformation that ensued."

== Interpretations and practice ==
=== Medieval practice ===
In medieval India, most ordinary Muslim men only had one wife. Polygamy was rare outside the wealthy class, unless in case of infertility of the first wife. It was rare for a lower or middle class woman to have a rival.

=== Modern interpretations and practice ===
Most modern Muslims view the practice of polygyny as allowed, but unusual and not recommended due to normative pressures for ordinary men. The practice of polygyny is often viewed in its historical context, as the marriage was the only way for a woman to be provided for during the time of Muhammad.

==== Ottoman Empire ====
Most men in the Ottoman Empire were monogamous while only a small minority were polygamous. Salomon Schweigger who travelled in the Ottoman Empire wrote in the late 16th century that polygamy was absent. In the 1700s wealthy families in Istanbul looked down on elite men who married more than once due to the untamed expression of their masculinity. High level officials were required to leave their wives and concubines if they were to marry an Ottoman princess. Lady Mary Wortley Montagu visited the Ottoman Empire in 1717 and purportedly noticed that while Muslims were allowed four wives no "man of quality" used this right. Of all the top Ottoman men at court, the author only found one who had female slaves.

==== Contemporary Asia ====
Polygamy among Muslims in Africa, 2019
Country	Muslims living in polygamous households
Burkina Faso	40%
Nigeria	40%
Mali	35%
Guinea-Bissau	30%
Gambia	30%
Niger	29%
Guinea	29%
Togo	26%
Cameroon	26%

In Indonesia, a majority-Muslim secular nation, polygyny is rare. In 2018, it was practiced by approximately 1% of the population. Among South Asian Muslims polygamy has always been rare.

==== Contemporary Africa ====
While most countries around the world polygamous families make up less than 0.5% of the population, a group of countries in West and Central sub-Saharan Africa, sometimes referred to as the “polygamy belt”, has the highest rates in the world, according to Pew Research. The group includes both Muslim-majority countries such as Senegal, Gambia and Mali, but also Christian-majority nations such as Cameroon, the Central African Republic and Benin (see table). (While the Christian populations include polygamous families, in only one country (Chad) is the Christian polygamous population higher than the Muslim one, but in several countries – Chad, Burkina Faso, Togo – it is the religiously "unaffiliated" population that has the highest percentage of polygamous family members.)

=== Countries that ban polygyny ===
- Turkey. In 1926, Turkey was the first Muslim-majority country to legally ban polygyny. This decision had no rationale in Islamic law, but rather was an entirely secular ban.
- Tunisia was the next country to ban polygyny through legislation passed in 1956 and restated in 1964. Unlike Turkey, Tunisia banned polygyny on religious grounds, citing two main reasons:
1. The Quran limited the practice of polygyny, thus it did not support the practice and, (according to the Tunisian lawmakers), clearly intended for the practice to be eliminated over time.
2. The Quran demands equal treatment of all wives in a polygynous marriage, which was deemed impossible, thus making the practice illegal.

=== Countries that restrict polygyny ===
Polygamy among Muslims, 2019
Country	Is polygyny legal?	Population living in polygamous households
Iraq	Y	<3%
Yemen	Y	<3%
Algeria	Y	<3%
Egypt	Y	<3%
Saudi Arabia	Y	N/A
Qatar	Y	N/A
UAE	Y	N/A
Most other MESA countries	Y	N/A
Muslims living Sub-Saharan; Africa	varies	25%

The following countries restrict the practice of polygyny:

- Egypt (1920)
- Sudan (1929)
- India (1939)
- Algeria
- Jordan (1951)
- Syria (1953)
- Morocco (1958)
- Bangladesh
- Iraq (1959)
- Iran (1967, 1975)
- Kuwait
- Lebanon

Some countries, including India, Iran, Iraq, Bangladesh, Algeria, Lebanon, Morocco, Jordan, Pakistan and Kuwait, allow women to include a clause in Nikah Nama prohibiting polygyny in marriage contracts. Other countries, such as Iran and Pakistan, require that a man get permission to take a second wife from his first wife, and then show the court proof of his first wife's consent.

Finally, countries such as Malaysia state that a man must get permission from both his wife and from the state governmental religious authority trought sharia court in order to take a second.

Although many countries have laws restricting or banning polygyny, it is still practiced illegally. It is difficult to enforce anti-polygyny laws and restrictions in countries with large rural populations. Furthermore, illegal polygyny often occurs in countries with poor social services as women rely on husbands to support them in these situations.

One way that polygyny is still legally practiced in Iran today is through the practice of mut'a, a temporary contractual relationship based on the mutual consent of a man and a woman. Throughout the contracted time, the woman must remain exclusively faithful to the man, and in return he must provide for her financially. Although this practice is technically legal, it is very highly disputed.

== Feminism and polygyny ==
=== Muslim feminism ===
Two leading self-described feminist Islamic scholars who support polygamy for men are Amina Wadud and Asma Barlas. They find the origin of the Islamic theory of polygyny in Quranic verse Q.4:3, which they believe demonstrates polygyny in Islam does not oppress women, but ensures that they are taken care of.

They blame societal practices, not Islam, for any gender inequality in Muslim society and embrace Islam as a religion that (they believe) preaches equality of the sexes. Through the reinterpretation of religious texts they seek to increase women's rights.

Wadud claims there are three reasons that the Qur'an views as acceptable for polygyny:

1. if the husband is not sexually satisfied he may take another wife rather than turn to prostitutes or an affair,
2. if the first wife is unable to reproduce or another woman with child needs to be taken care of,
3. and/or if the husband is financially stable enough to care for another woman in the Muslim community.

According to Wadud, the form of polygyny that the Qur'an supports focuses on "justice: dealing justly, managing funds justly, justice to the orphans, and justice to the wives." Barlas argues a very similar point.

=== Secular feminism ===
The other form of feminism in the Islamic world is independent or state feminism. The premise behind this movement is that "no reform is possible in an Islamic legal and political system where 'the very structure of power is male dominated to an absolute degree, back by the Constitution, an all-male clerical system ruling the country.'" They also point out that Islam supports and perpetuates a clear female role that designates women to the margins of society. These Muslim feminists argue that there is only so much that reinterpreting the texts can do and believe that the best – and perhaps only – way to increasing women's rights is outside of the parameters of Islam. Therefore, changing polygynist practices would involve reforming the political and legal systems instead of just trying to reinterpret the Qur’an and the hadiths to determine if they really support the practice and to what extent.

=== Women's movements and family law reforms in the Middle East ===
Feminism's effect on polygyny in Islam has varied according to the location and society.

==== Arab world ====
For example, Egypt, Jordan, and Morocco also began restricting polygynous practices in Islam. Egypt's personal status laws underwent many changes between 1979 and 1985, but in the end they were very restrictive for women and reduced the limits on polygyny. This incentivized Egyptian feminists to create a new marriage contract (approved in 2000) that would give women some rights concerning divorce and what was allowable in marriage. Jordan was able to have more success in 2001 when it amended its Civil Status Law, which requires the consent of the wife before the husband marries again. This change was accompanied by a handful of other progressive decisions on women's rights in the country, greatly improving the status of women. Morocco was also pushed along by its Muslim feminist groups to make entering into a polygynous marriage more difficult.

==== Iran ====
In Iran, changes to women's rights occurred in the wake of the Islamic Revolution in 1979. During this revolution the Family Protection Law, which had given some power to women and imposed minimal restrictions on polygyny, was overturned. Muslim women were encouraged to return to their traditional roles. This loss of rights led to the movement realizing that they could not necessarily rely on the government alone to protect their rights. This spurred the creation of the personal status laws, which covered many issues relating to marriage and divorce including polygyny. Passed in 1986, the law "effectively reinstates the provision of the 1975 Family Protection Law granting a wife the right to obtain a divorce if her husband marries a second woman without the wife's permission of if...a man does not treat his wives fairly and equally." This offers Iranian Muslim women some legal protection against polygyny, but the enforcement of the law is still up to the interpretation of the courts. Muslim women's movement organizations have begun to gain more power in Iran due to the increasing number of Muslim women who are studying the Qur'an analytically. These new scholars are able to argue for interpretations of Islam that empower rather than oppress women. They also lead organizations like the Association of Muslim Women and Zeynab. Many Muslim women also go jalasehs where they can openly discuss religious texts in a safe environment.

==== Indonesia and Malaysia ====
Islamic communities in Asia, such as Indonesia and Malaysia, have also experienced feminist movements which work to restrict polygynous practices. Indonesian feminists have challenged these practices through the study and reinterpretation of religious texts. Fatayat NU, a voluntary Muslim women's organization, was created in 1950 for middle-aged women who were a part of Nahdlatul Ulama, a Sunni Islam group, and wanted to have a voice. Initially experiencing membership issues due to large percentage of women who were married or uneducated, Fatayat NU began to gain power as institutions outside of Indonesia took notice of it and supported the organizations work. The women in Fatayat NU use Islam and the religious texts to justify their actions and guide their decisions, so women who have extensively studied the religion are crucial. Out of the many controversial issues that Fatayat NU takes a stand on, polygyny is one that has recently come into contention. Although polygyny in Indonesia was never very popular, some Muslim women are worried that it is starting to gain more support. Nahdlatul Ulama is one of the organizations that approves of polygyny as an Islamic practice, but Fatayat NU is taking a contradicting stance; the members believe that polygyny can only be possible if men and women are unequal, which goes against their interpretation of the Qur'an's message on gender status.

In Malaysia, polygyny has been considered a topic that is not fit to be brought up in public, but recently it has begun to enter public discourse. This change came about through the passage of a new Islamic family law, which supports polygynous practices by making them easier for men to take part in. This has created a "debate between Islamic fundamentalists who dominate the burgeoning Islamic Affairs Department that administers Shariah law and mostly Western-educated Muslim feminists who say the department, in its overzealous interpretation of the Qur’an, has gone overboard in making new laws that discriminate against women and children." The campaign against this law was very popular, but the law was still passed. Muslim women's organizations in Malaysia plan to continue protesting it until it is revoked.

== Polygyny in Islamic popular culture ==
=== Literature ===
Polygyny has appeared in literature in many different Islamic societies. Indian Muslim literature has traditionally stood divided on its position on polygyny as a justifiable practice. Two Indian authors, Akbari Begum and Bashiruddin Ahmad, revealed in their novels a belief that polygyny is acceptable in certain circumstances; whereas Nazr Sajjad Hyder opposed this notion and completely rejected the practice in her work. Gudar ka Lal (The Ruby in Rags), written in 1907 by Akbari Begum, projected the author's beliefs on a wide range of subjects involving the treatment of Muslim women and girls, including polygyny. The story's plotline revolves around the relationships between Yusuf Raza and his two wives, Maqbool and Mehr Jabeen. Yusuf Raza remarries when he realizes that his first wife is so uneducated that she does not know how to properly take care of her children or the household. At first, Maqbool is resentful of Mehr Jabeen, but eventually she recognizes Mehr Jabeen's kind and friendly nature, and the two become friends. This happy outcome reflects Begum's belief that polygyny in Islam can be justified when marriages are seen as incompatible and could benefit from a second wife who could help around the house and thus ease tensions. Bashiruddin Ahmad's novel, Iqbal Dulham (The Bride Iqbal), also promotes the ideal polygynous relationship where the wives become friends and find vital companionship instead of competition. Published in 1908, Iqbal Dulham follows a young man, Iqbal Mirza, who marries a second wife after his first wife fails to conceive children. The initial tension between the wives is relieved when the second wife gives birth. Once Iqbal Mirza has children, his relationship with his first wife improves, and the two wives are then able to become friends. Thus, Ahmad portrays how polygyny can be used to ease the pressure on the first wife to produce children. In both stories polygyny is a solution to domestic disharmony.

Nazr Sajjad Hyder, however, shows her disproval of the practice of polygyny in Ah-e Mazluman (Sighs of the Oppressed), written around 1912. The two households in Ah-e Mazluman, both engage in polygynous practices, but Hyder presents the relationships between husband and wives as very negatively affected; the stories "accentuate the cruelty of husbands towards their wives and aim to intensify the exclusion and alienation experienced by the first wife." Hyder perceives polygyny as a practice that is harming Islam and giving it a bad reputation. She recommends its end and pleads that Muslim men act in a more just manner towards their women.

The complexity of Islamic polygyny is also revealed in Assia Djebar's Ombre sultane (Shadow sultana). Written in Algeria in 1987, it is told from the perspective of the first wife, Isma. She thus constructs through her descriptions how the reader perceives the second wife and the husband. The second wife, Hajila, is seen as a rival and is reduced through Isma's portrayals to body parts that are disassociated from Hajila as a whole person. This reveals Isma's lack of respect for Hajila and the process of "othering" that Isma uses to degrade Hajila. Hence, the idea that polygyny creates a sense of solidarity between wives is shown to be flawed. Isma also describes Hajila in unflattering terms that distance her from the attentions of the husband they share and of other men. This is in contrast to Isma's depiction of herself as constantly being the object of male desire, creating a sense that sisterhood between the two women is out of the question. However, Isma's diction also creates a relationship between herself and Hajila in which neither can exist without the other; "they are locked in a sorority created, in a way, in tandem with the patriarchal force that remains a threat to their very existence." Therefore, Djebar's portrayal of polygyny is multifaceted and conflicting: it has the ability to create both rivalry and solidarity.

=== Music ===
Polygyny in Islam has surfaced in music around the world and across the decades. For instance, in Malaysia in the 1950s and 60s, the famous entertainer P. Ramlee dealt with many sociopolitical issues in his art. Whereas the rest of the music industry was under the outside influence of Latin America, India, and the United States, Ramlee's music was inspired by what was going on in Malaysian society. He critiqued the practice of polygyny to keep in line with his self-proclaimed role of exposing the weaknesses of his society. These socially critical songs did not necessarily fit into the categories of popular music at the time, but they were still embraced by his audiences.

Hip hop has become increasingly popular across the world, and Islam has had a significant influence in rap music in the United States where hip hop first emerged. Two Muslim hip hop artists who bring up the concept of polygyny in their music are Miss Undastood and Sons of Hagar. "Miss Undastood, a young veiled, African-American lyricist, raps on her CD Dunya or Deen (Life or Faith) about war, love, the challenges of being a young Muslim woman in America, and the power of faith." Sons of Hagar is another hip hop group that seeks to positively portray Islam in their lyrics and support Islamic practices in their actions. Their song, "Sisterssss," supports polygynous practices. The members of the group rationalize that even though polygyny is illegal in America, rapping about it is much less offensive than when other artists rap about prostitutes.

=== Film ===
Islamic polygyny has also appeared as a controversial issue in films. For example, Ayat-ayat Cinta (Verses of Love) was released in Indonesia in 2008. This movie follows the life of Fahri bin Abdillah, a student in Egypt, and his relationships with four women. The film inspired more open, public discussion on polygyny in Indonesia by calling attention to the conditions of women who enter into polygynous relationships. Another Indonesian movie that tackles the subject of polygyny is Berbagi Suami (Husband for Share), which came out in 2006. The director, Nia Dinata, was inspired by her experiences in Indonesia with women who were in polygynous relationships. She acknowledges that every woman reacted in different ways to their marriage but ultimately all felt isolated and saddened by the addition of a new wife. Three stories are told within the movie and all three leading actresses learn to at least outwardly accept their situations, whether they are the first wife finding about the existence of other women or the new addition to the family who has to situate herself in the household hierarchy.

=== Television ===
The Philippine television series, Legal Wives, focuses on a Muslim man marrying three women. It is noted as the first Islam-oriented television series in the country.

== See also ==
- Cousin marriage in the Middle East
- Islamic sexual jurisprudence
- Islamic views on slavery
- Mormonism and Islam
- Nikah Misyar
- Obedient Wives Club
- Rape in Islamic law
- Rights and obligations of spouses in Islam
- Sex segregation and Islam
- History of concubinage in the Muslim world
- Waithood
- What your right hands possess
- Widow inheritance

== Sources ==
- Dewedar, Rasha (4 June 2021). Fatima Qureshi; Hamizah Adzmi (eds.). "rethinking-polygamy-lets-talk-about-the-consequences". musawah.org.
- Engineer, Asghar Ali (1992). Rights of Women in Islam. New York: St. Martin's Press.
- Philips, Abu Ameenah Bilal; Jones, Jamila (2005) [1994]. Polygamy in Islam (PDF). International Islamic Publishing House.
- Ali-Karamali, Sumbul (2008). The Muslim Next Door: The Qur'an, the Media, and that Veil Thing. Ashland, Oregon: White Cloud Press. p. 142. ISBN 978-0-9745245-6-6.
