= Al-Arqam =

Islamic religious sect based in Malaysia

- Al-Arqam official logo

Total population
- Estimated tens of thousands (before the ban)

Founder
- Ashaari Muhammad

Regions with significant populations
- Malaysia, Indonesia, Brunei, Singapore, Thailand
- Malaysia: Significant presence prior to ban
- Indonesia: Moderate presence
- Brunei: Smaller presence

Scriptures
- Quran and the teachings of Ashaari Muhammad (Aurad Muhammadiyah)

Languages
- Malay language
- Al-Arqam began in 1968 but was banned in Malaysia in 1994 and later rebranded as the GISBH, which continues to this day.

Al-Arqam, also known as Darul Arqam, is a Malaysian-based deviant Islamic movement founded by Ashaari Muhammad. Named after Al-Arqam ibn Abi al-Arqam, a companion of Muhammad, the movement was officially banned by the Malaysian federal government on 21 October 1994. Following the ban, over five members, including Ashaari Muhammad, were arrested in Thailand under the Internal Security Act (ISA) and deported to Malaysia.

Despite the ban, the movement's influence persisted through several business ventures that became widely recognized, including the Rufaqa' Corporation, Global Ikhwan, and GISBH (Global Ikhwan Services and Business Holdings). These enterprises, particularly Global Ikhwan, attracted widespread media attention, notably for the Ikhwan Polygamy Club and Obedient Wives Club which were perceived as efforts to revive Al-Arqam.

In addition to its business ventures, the movement continued to face scrutiny for its religious teachings. Two books authored by Khadijah Aam, Ashaari’s wife, were banned on religious grounds for claims that Ashaari had been empowered by God with supernatural abilities. These claims further fueled concerns among religious authorities about Al-Arqam’s deviance from true Islamic teachings.

== Origins ==
The movement began as a small group that established a relatively isolated, self-sustaining community practising strict adherence to Islamic principles and developing a home-based economy. Founded in 1968 by Ashaari Muhammad, a former government religious teacher, the movement's early days were marked by a halaqah (study circle) in Kampung Datuk Keramat, a Malay suburb of Kuala Lumpur.

In 1975, the movement expanded its focus to include Islamic education by establishing its first school under the Yayasan Al-Arqam (Al-Arqam Foundation). As the movement continued to attract followers and expand its influence, Al-Arqam established a permanent base in Kampung Sungai Penchala.

By 1993, Darul Arqam operated 257 educational institutions in Malaysia and abroad, with 9,541 students and nearly 700 self-trained teachers. These schools, free from the Ministry of Education’s control, provided an Islamic education that balanced religious and vocational knowledge, preparing students for both spiritual and worldly responsibilities.

== Sungai Penchala and expansion ==
In 1975, Al-Arqam established a permanent base in Kampung Sungai Penchala, 20 kilometers northeast of downtown Kuala Lumpur. This new base, referred to as the "Arqam Village," became both the group's main headquarters and a model of an ideal Islamic community. The village housed a mosque, houses, librarys, dormitories, offices, and shops, serving as the central hub for Al-Arqam's expanding missionary and economic activities.

== Membership and structure ==
Al-Arqam attracted a significant following, particularly from urban Malays and educated professionals. Its organizational structure was hierarchical, with Ashaari Muhammad at the helm, supported by deputies and close family members in key leadership roles. The group's membership did not require formal registration or fees; participation in the movement’s activities and adherence to its rules were sufficient for inclusion.

== Economic philosophy ==
With its hierarchical structure and strong community organization, Al-Arqam was able to implement a distinctive economic model known as "Arqamnomics," which integrated Islamic principles into every aspect of economic life. This approach emphasized the production of halal goods and services while operating self-sustaining businesses that did not prioritize profit maximization. In the 1970s, the movement began establishing businesses that included food production, retail, agriculture, and industrial services.

By the early 1990s, Al-Arqam had grown into a conglomerate known as the Arqam Group of Companies, which engaged in a variety of industries ranging from agriculture to advanced technology. The economic success and growing influence of Al-Arqam's ventures raised concerns among the Malaysian government, ultimately leading to its crackdown in 1994.

== Challenges and crackdown ==
In 1994, the Malaysian government banned Al-Arqam, citing concerns about the movement’s deviation from Islamic orthodoxy and its potential political threat. Religious authorities condemned Al-Arqam’s teachings, particularly the belief that Ashaari Muhammad was the prophesied Putera Bani Tamim, a figure said to assist the Mahdi in establishing a just Islamic order. This eschatological claim, combined with the belief in the reappearance of Sheikh Muhammad Abdullah Al-Suhaimi as the Mahdi, led the authorities to classify the movement as deviant.

Following the ban, leaders of the movement were arrested, and its properties were seized. Despite this, the movement’s educational and economic activities persisted under different names, notably Rufaqa' Corporation and later GISBH.

== Revival efforts ==
=== 2000s: Rufaqa' Corporation ===
Governmental and media reports suggested that former members were attempting to revive the movement through Rufaqa' Corporation. Founded by Ashaari in Bandar Country Homes in Rawang, Selangor, the organization operated 80 businesses in Malaysia, including mini markets, cafeterias, herbal products, tourism, advertising, furniture, clinics, electronics, multimedia, childcare centres, and publishing. Sheikh Hussein Sheikh Omar, a former member, claimed that many of these businesses were not financially sustainable and primarily served to recruit new members to revive Al-Arqam. He also alleged that employees were not paid wages but instead directed their earnings to the leadership in exchange for spiritual rewards.

In November 2006, Malaysian authorities raided the upper floor of a bakery and arrested over 100 individuals suspected of attempting to re-establish Al-Arqam. The group was officially banned in December 2006, with Prime Minister Abdullah Ahmad Badawi stating that legal action would be taken against any efforts to revive the movement.

=== 2020s: Global Ikhwan ===
Global Ikhwan Services and Business Holdings (GISBH), founded by Ashaari's widow, represents a rebranding of the movement's business ventures, active since the 2010s. Like its predecessors, GISBH oversees business operations in Malaysia and in over 20 countries, primarily under the Ikhwan brand. The company employs over 5,000 individuals.

In September 2024, a child sex abuse scandal emerged involving orphanages operated by GISBH in the states of Selangor and Negeri Sembilan. Police raids led to the rescue of over 400 children, with nearly 200 additional children rescued in other regions.

== See also ==
- Ashaari Muhammad
- Obedient Wives Club
