= Ashaari Muhammad =

Malaysian Islamic founder of the Al-Arqam movement

Haji Ashaari Muhammad
- Born: 30 October 1937; Kampung Pilin, Rembau, Negeri Sembilan, Federated Malay States
- Died: 13 May 2010 (aged 72); Ipoh, Perak, Malaysia
- Other name: Abuya
- Occupations: Religious sect leader, founder of Al-Arqam
- Spouses: 5
- Children: 37

Haji Ashaari Muhammad (30 October 1937 – 13 May 2010) was the founder and leader of the Malaysian Islamic group Al-Arqam, which gained prominence in the 1980s and early 1990s. On 21 October 1994, the Malaysian federal government banned Al-Arqam, citing concerns over its teachings and activities. Ashaari, along with other members of the group, was arrested in Thailand and subsequently returned to Malaysia, where he was detained under the Internal Security Act (ISA). He remained in detention from 1994 until 2004. During this period, Ashaari publicly renounced his views, and the legal process did not include a formal defence against the charges.

Ashaari was referred to as Abaya (Arabic for "father") by his followers. He was recognized for his distinctive appearance, which included wearing a turban, green Al-Arqam robes, and kohl-lined eyes.

== Early life ==
Ashaari Muhammad was born on 30 October 1937 in Kampung Pilin, Rembau, Negeri Sembilan, in what was then the Federated Malay States (now Malaysia). His parents practised a tariqa founded by Sheikh Muhammad bin Abdullah as-Suhaimi, and from a young age, Ashaari developed an interest in Islamic practices. By age 13, he was initiated into the tariqa by his uncle, Lebai Ibrahim, a religious teacher. In 1954, Ashaari began attending Maahad Hishamuddin, a religious school in Klang, Selangor, while living with his father, Muhammad bin Idris, an English-educated customs officer, and his stepmother.

== Spiritual career ==
=== Career with Al-Arqam ===
In 1968, after working as a government religious teacher, Ashaari initiated a low-profile halaqah (study group circle) in Kampung Datuk Keramat, a Malay suburb of Kuala Lumpur. This study group laid the foundation for what would eventually become the Islamic group Al-Arqam, which gained prominence in the 1980s. Under Ashaari's leadership, the group promoted Islamic values of spirituality, self-reliance, and communal living. His futuristic vision, based on interpretations of Islamic texts, predicted that Southeast Asia, particularly Malaysia, would play a central role in the resurgence of Islamic civilization.

=== Economic and social influence ===
Under Ashaari's leadership, Al-Arqam developed into a significant socio-economic movement. The group established various businesses, educational institutions, and communal living arrangements aimed at promoting self-sufficiency among its members. These initiatives reportedly generated income and provided employment for the group. The establishment of these enterprises was part of Al-Arqam's broader goal of building a self-reliant Islamic community, guided by its interpretation of Islamic teachings.

By the 1990s, Al-Arqam had built 44 communes throughout Malaysia and Southeast Asia. These economic ventures provided jobs and self-reliance for its members, further attracting followers. Al-Arqam's emphasis on economic independence set it apart from other Islamic movements of the time but also raised concerns within the Malaysian government about the group's potential to destabilize the socio-political order.

=== Teachings and practices ===
Ashaari's teachings were grounded in Islamic principles but included elements that were considered controversial by religious authorities. Central to his teachings was the Aurad Muhammadiyah, a set of prayers and spiritual practices central to Al-Arqam’s religious routine. These practices emphasized spiritual purification and collective worship and were strictly followed by the group’s members.

Ashaari was associated with beliefs connected to the Bani Tamim, a prophesied group in Islamic eschatology. Some of Ashaari’s followers believed he was the leader prophesied to be connected to this group. Additionally, Ashaari taught that Sheikh Muhammad Abdullah al-Suhaimi, the founder of the Aurad Muhammadiyah, would return as the Mahdi, a prophesied figure in Islam. These teachings contributed to the messianic expectations within Al-Arqam.

Additionally, Ashaari's vision for Islamic resurgence extended beyond religious practices to include socio-political and economic dimensions. He promoted a belief in the role of Southeast Asia, particularly Malaysia, as central to an Islamic revival. Ashaari believed that the revival would be led by Malay-Muslims, whom he saw as uniquely positioned due to their blend of Arab and Malay heritage.

== Personal life ==
Ashaari was married five times and had 37 children. His first marriage, to Hasnah binti Haji Salim, occurred in 1959 and ended in divorce in 1985. He married Tengku Noriah Tengku Abdullah in 1978, followed by Rokiah Mohd Radhi and Khadijah Aam in 1980. Rokiah died in 2002, and Ashaari married Noraziah Ibrahim in 1985. His practice of polygamy was by Islamic marital laws, and his family life became a notable aspect of his public persona.

== Death and legacy ==
Ashaari Muhammad died on 13 May 2010 at the Ipoh Specialist Hospital at the age of 72. After his death, aspects of Ashaari’s teachings, particularly the Aurad Muhammadiyah, continued to be practised by splinter groups and loyal followers. His family, particularly his wife Khadijah Aam, continued to publish works promoting his legacy.

Ashaari’s ideas, especially those focused on economic self-sufficiency, spiritual discipline, and communal living, left a lasting impact on some segments of the Malaysian Islamic community. While his teachings were controversial and led to the disbandment of Al-Arqam, they continued to influence discussions on alternative models of Islamic living in Malaysia. Some of his works and teachings were banned by Malaysian authorities on religious grounds, as they were viewed as deviating from orthodox Islamic doctrine. The government cited claims made in these works, including assertions of Ashaari's supernatural powers and his ability to communicate with Muhammad (through yaqazah), as justification for their prohibition.

== Bibliography ==
=== Authored works ===
Ashaari Muhammad was a prolific author who produced numerous works on Islamic teachings, spirituality, and socio-political issues. His writings were central to the Al-Arqam movement and addressed various aspects of personal and communal life in Islam. Some of his notable works include:

- Inilah Jalan Kita (in Malay). 1984.
- Ibadah Menurut Islam (in Malay). 1980. ISBN 9799578663.
- Iman Dan Persoalannya (in Malay). 1983.
- Matlamat Perjuangan Menurut Islam (in Malay). 1984.
- Mengenal Diri Melalui Rasa Hati (in Malay). 1985.
- Aurad Muhammadiyah Pegangan Darul Arqam (in Malay). 1986.
- Siapakah Mujaddid Kurun 15 (in Malay). 1987.
- Krisis Dan Jalan Penyelesaiannya (in Malay). 1987.
- Bahaya Syiah (in Malay). 1987.
- Inilah Pandanganku (in Malay). 1988.
- Berhati-hati Membuat Tuduhan (in Malay). 1989.
- Kenapa Salahkan Musuh (in Malay). 1989.
- Manisnya Madu (in Malay). 1990.
- Inilah Sikap Kita (in Malay). 1990.
- Renungan Untuk Mengubah Sikap (in Malay). 1990.
- Pendidikan Rasulullah (in Malay). 1990.
- Pembangun Jiwa dan Fikiran Ummah (in Malay). 1990.
- Langkah-langkah Perjuangan (in Malay). 1991.
- Manusia Tidak Memiliki Dan Tidak Dimiliki (in Malay). 1991.
- Aqidah Mukmin Siri 1 (in Malay). 1991.
- Aqidah Mukmin Siri 2 (in Malay). 1991.
- Perang Teluk Islam Akan Kembali Gemilang (in Malay). 1991.
- Konsep Kesederhanaan Menurut Pandangan Islam (in Malay). 1991.
- Ulama Menurut Pandangan Islam (in Malay). 1992.
- Falsafah Perlaksanaan Hukum Hudud Dalam Masyarakat. 1992.
- Falsafah Kemiskinan Dan Jalan Penyelesaiannya Menurut Islam. 1993.
- The West on The Brink of Death. 1993.
- Presiden Soeharto Ikut Jadual Allah. 1993. ISBN 9839890018.
- Barat di Ambang Maut (in Malay). 1993.
- Keadilan Menurut Islam (in Malay). 1993.
- Meninjau Sistem Pemerintahan Islam (in Malay). 1993.
- Aqidah Mukmin Siri 3 (in Malay). 1993.
- Kasih Sayang Kunci Perpaduan Sejagat (in Malay). 1994.
- Jihad Bukan Membunuh Tapi Membangun Peradaban (in Malay). 2004.
- Buah Fikiran Siri 1. 2005. ISBN 9832492424.
- Buah Fikiran Siri 2. 2005. ISBN 9832492475.
- Nasihat Buatmu Bekas Kawan-kawan Lamaku Dalam Arqam. 2005. ISBN 9832492386.
- Kumpulan Sajak Tauhid. 2005.
- Kumpulan Sajak Siri 2 Tasawuf. 2005.
- Kumpulan Sajak Perjuangan Dan Umum. 2005.
- Bisikan Hati: Koleksi Madah Hatiku. 2005.
- Tsunami Pembawa Mesej Dari Tuhan. 2005.
- Pendidikan Rapat Dengan Rohaniah Manusia. 2006. ISBN 9832492467.
- Koleksi Sajak Sembahyang Melahirkan Rasa Kehambaan Dan Membina Jati Diri. 2006.
- Politik Islam Membawa Kasih Sayang. 2007. ISBN 9789834233686.
- Islamic Politics: Politics of Love And Fraternity. 2007.
- Keluarga Bahagia (in Malay). 2008.
- Modul Poligami Indah Dari Tuhan (in Malay). 2009.

=== Secondary literature ===
In addition to Ashaari’s writings, several works have been published that examine his life, teachings, and the impact of Al-Arqam. These secondary sources provide critical insights into his role in Malaysian Islamic discourse. Key titles include:

- Wan Seng, Ann (2005). Al-Arqam di Sebalik Tabir (in Malay). UM Press. ISBN 9831002571.
- Aam, Khadijah (2006). Abuya Ashaari Muhammad: Pemimpin Paling Ajaib di Zamannya (in Malay). Rawang, Selangor: Penerbitan Minda Ikhwan. ISBN 9832492564.
- Ya'cub, A. Tasman (2006). Dakwah Islam Dalam Perpektif Ashaari Muhammad (in Malay).
- Haji Ashaari, Nizamuddin Mohd; Ahmad, Laila (2007). Abuya Hj Ashaari Muhammad Adalah Putera Bani Tamim (in Malay). Kuala Lumpur: Perniagaan Mata Angin.
- Aam, Hatijah (2010). Tsunami Membuktikan Abuya Putra Bani Tamim (Satria Peringit) (in Malay). Jakarta: Giliran Timur Books.

== See also ==
- Al-Arqam
- Obedient Wives Club
