= Jew in the City =

American Orthodox Jewish organization

Jew in the City is an American Orthodox Jewish nonprofit organization.

== Mission ==
The organization was founded in 2007 by Allison Josephs initially with the mission of breaking down stereotypes about religious Jews by offering a humorous, meaningful look into Orthodox Judaism and creating original social media content in an effort to offer a more nuanced perception of the Orthodox community. In 2013, Jew in the City expanded its programming to former and questioning Haredi Jews after being approached by a former-hasidic couple who said they were fans of the work and were looking to remain religious, even though they had left their community of origin. Based on this need, Jew in the City launched Project Makom which helps former and questioning Haredi Jews find their place in Orthodoxy. Because the people coming to Project Makom had such traumatic pasts, Allison Josephs realized that the worst stories that are featured in the media about the Orthodox community are not actually stereotypes, but are rather the most abusive situations that exist. In a blog post in 2018, she announced that due to this realization, she and her board had decided to update the mission of the organization. Jew in the City's current mission statement is: Jew in the City reverses negative associations about religious Jews by putting forth an approach based on kindness, tolerance, sincerity, and critical thinking and makes engaging and meaningful Orthodox Judaism known and accessible.

== History ==
Raised in a Conservative Jewish home, Allison Josephs became a baalat teshuva to Orthodoxy during her teen years. After graduating with a B.A. in Philosophy from Columbia University, she worked in various Jewish outreach programs, including Partners in Torah, where she encountered students with negative misconceptions about Orthodoxy.

She created the Internet personality "Jew in the City" to use online media to reach a wide network of people so that anyone could ask an Orthodox Jew questions and learn about the reality behind the stereotypes.

"Jew in the City" began in 2007 with a website and Facebook, Instagram, Twitter, and YouTube pages filled with articles and videos that give an intimate look into the world of Orthodoxy. While Josephs started off using vignettes from her life to create articles and videos, as the staff has expanded and freelance writers have been brought on, the articles and videos are now a team effort. At times, Josephs responds directly to incidents of perceived bias in media reports about Orthodox Jews. The organization in the City has recently expanded to offer corporate cultural diversity training and consulting services for media outlets .

== Orthodox Jewish All Stars ==
Jew in the City hosts an annual awards ceremony called “Orthodox Jewish All Stars”, bestowing awards on ten Orthodox Jews who were able to achieve great things while staying true to their religion. In 2013, the awards were sponsored by the Orthodox Union.

== Responses ==
The work has been lauded in news outlets including The Wall Street Journal, NPR, The Daily Beast, Yahoo! News, The Jewish Press, The Jewish Week, and Arutz Sheva. In 2012 Josephs was named one of the Top 10 Jewish Influencers in Social Media and in 2013 she was named one of The Jewish Week’s 36 Under 36, a list of influential Jews under age 36.

Jew in the City has been featured in a range of Orthodox publications from centrist to Haredi. Josephs has also been called naïve for her article attempting to bridge the rift between the Reform and Orthodox communities over the controversy about the Women of the Wall.

In 2016 her article and short video on the "skin gap" prompted discussions on websites such as Glossy and Grok Nation, the Nachum Segal radio show, and other venues.
