= Sharia courts in Malaysia =

Courts dealing with Sharia law cases in Malaysia

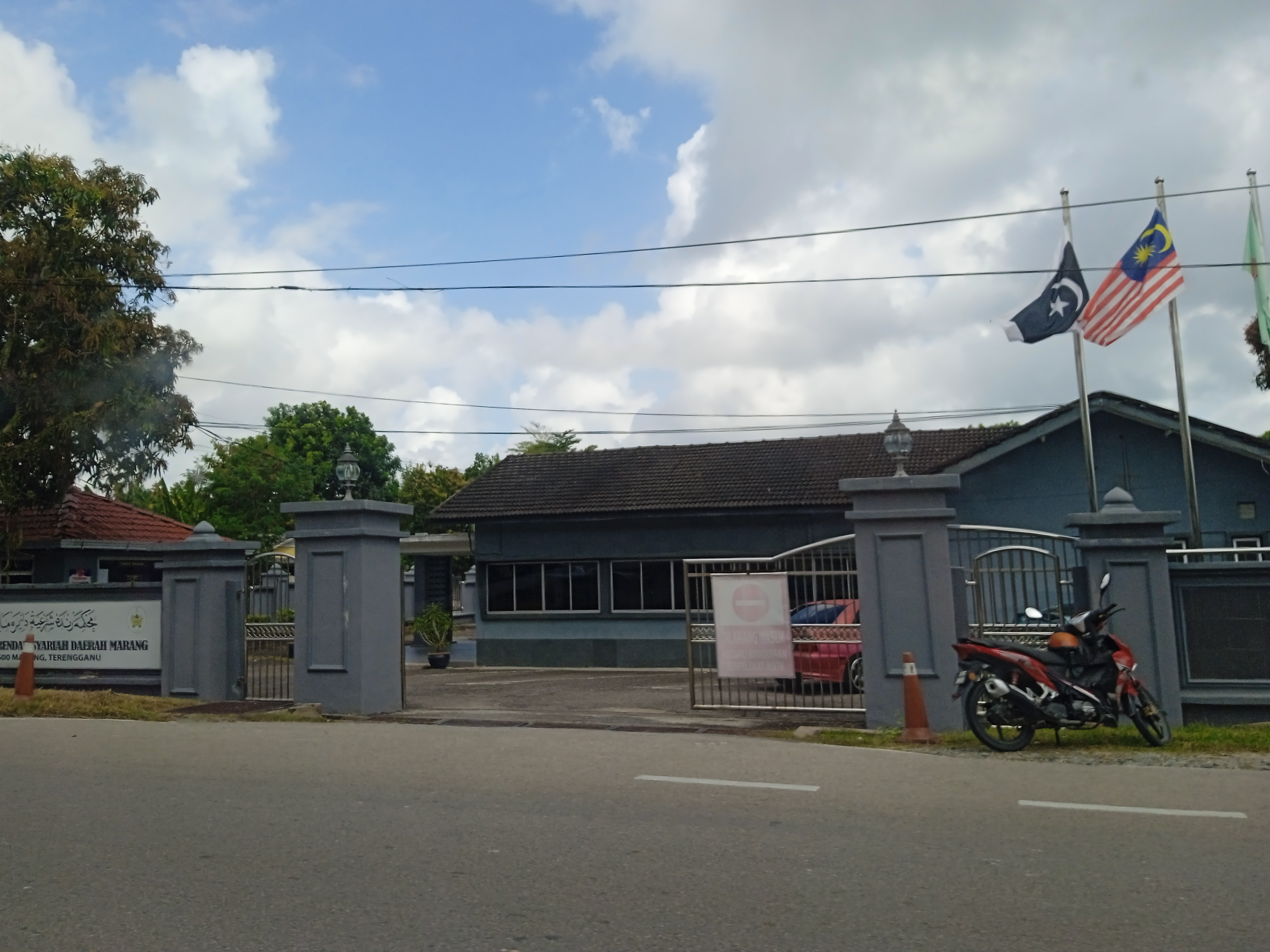
Marang District Syariah Court

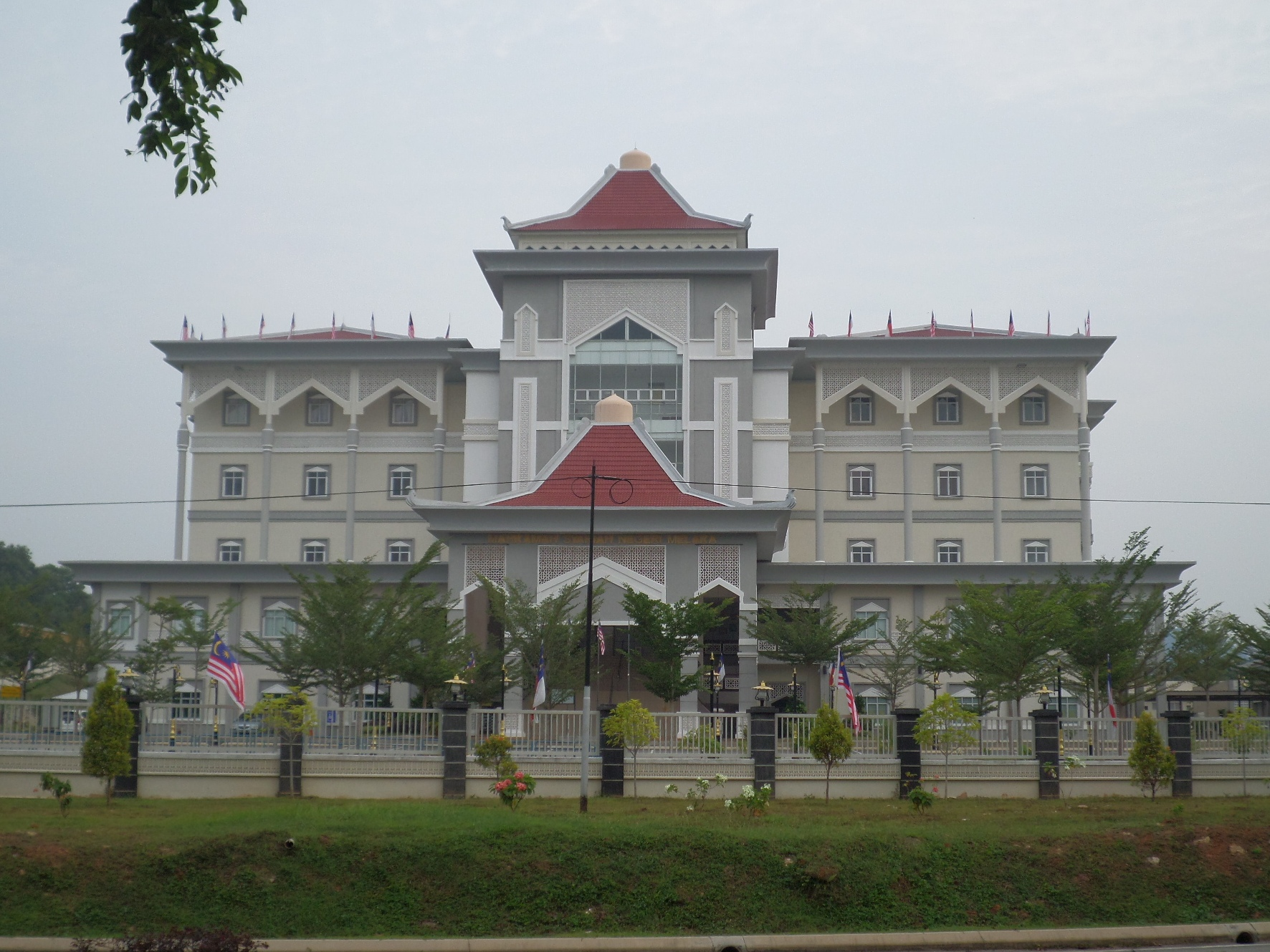
The Malacca State Syariah Court in Ayer Keroh

Syariah (Jawi: شرعية) is the Malay spelling of sharia in Islamic religious law and deals with exclusively Islamic laws, having jurisdiction upon every Muslim in Malaysia. The Syariah Court system is one of the two separate court systems which exist in the general Malaysian legal system. There is a parallel system of state Syariah Courts, which have limited jurisdiction over matters of state Islamic law. Syariah Courts have jurisdiction only over Muslims in matters relating to family law and religious observance, and can generally only pass sentences of not more than three years' imprisonment, a fine of up to RM5,000, and/or up to six strokes of the cane.

Since 1988, Article 121(1A) of the Malaysian constitution stipulated that secular civil courts do not have jurisdiction over matters that fall under the purview of Syariah Courts. However, the civil superior courts retained the sole supervisory role in constitutional issues, even if it involved Islamic laws. Similarly, Article 145 of the constitution also dictated that the Attorney General of Malaysia has no power over matters related to the Syariah Courts.

There are three levels of the courts: Appeal, High, and Subordinate.

Unlike Malaysian civil courts, which are federal in scope, Syariah Courts are primarily established by individual state law. Similarly, Islamic law is a matter limited to each state, with the exception of the Federal Territories of Malaysia, as provided in Item 1 of State List in the Ninth Schedule of the constitution. Thus, the application of sharia law may differ among the states. There are 13 state sharia law departments and one for the Federal Territories.

== Chief judges of the Syariah Court ==
- Sheikh Ghazali Abdul Rahman (1997–2009)
- Ibrahim Lembut (2009–2017)
- Mukhyuddin Ibrahim (2017–2019)
- Mohd Na'im bin Mokhtar (2019-2022)
- Mohd Amran bin Mohd Zain (2022– )

== Judges of the Syariah Court of Appeal ==
=== Current judges ===
1. Mohd Nadzri bin Abdul Rahman
2. Mohd Shakir Abdul Hamid
3. Mohd Shukor Sabudin
4. Mohd Radhi Abdul Latif
5. Abas Nordin
6. Norhadina Ahmad Zabidi

== See also ==
- Sharia caning in Malaysia
