= Obedient Wives Club =

Islamic faith-based organization

The Obedient Wives Club is an international Islamic religious organization which claims to promote harmonious families by teaching wives how to be submissive to their husbands. Composed of up to 3000 members, this group currently operates in Malaysia, Indonesia, Singapore, Australia, Kazakhstan, and Jordan, and in 2011 it declared plans to open chapters in England and France in 2013. In October 2011, the Obedient Wives Club published an explicit 115-page sex manual, titled Islamic Sex, a highly controversial book, which encouraged wives to act like "first class prostitutes" in order to keep husbands from straying. This book is currently banned in Indonesia and Malaysia. Despite the book only being available to its club, some of its content has been made known, sparking fierce debates online. Mainstream Muslim organizations in Malaysia have also disparaged the club.

== History ==
The club was founded by a business firm called Global Ikhwan, a business conglomerate associated with the banned Islamic sect Al-Arqam. On June 3, 2011, Global Ikhwan established the first section of the Obedient Wives Club in Kuala Lumpur, Malaysia. Originally intended to help the female staff become good wives and productive employees, the group's main goal was to alter the way Muslim wives viewed sex within marriage. The group claims that women only show their husbands 10% of what they desired from their bodies.

Global Ikhwan, which also founded a controversial polygamy club, has been closely tied to the religious Islamic group Al-Arqam which was banned in Malaysia in 1994. The Obedient Wives Club denies allegations that they are trying to revive Al-Arqam.

Although the Obedient Wives Club claims to be an Islamic organization, they are open to all women, regardless of their denomination or religion. The Obedient Wives Club claims to fight divorce, domestic violence, and other social ills by teaching wives how to please their husbands. As one member put it, "A man married to a woman who is as good or better than a prostitute in bed has no reason to stray. Rather than allowing him to sin, a woman must do all she can to ensure his desires are met."

The club has opened a branch in Singapore in June 2011, attracting a handful of members. The country's Islamic Religious Council has condemned the group. The group expanded into Indonesia at about the same time, claiming to have approximately 300 members there.

In 2015, the club announced that it had dissolved itself, and its members had rebranded it as Rumah Poligami Indah Dari Tuhan ("Beautiful Polygamy Home From God").

The club's parent organization has moved its headquarters to Mecca, Saudi Arabia, and have expanded throughout South East Asia.

== Controversy ==
In October 2011, the Obedient Wives Club published a 115-page book, guiding women through the physical and spiritual aspects of sex. This book, titled Islamic Sex, quickly stirred controversy. Many groups, such as Sisters in Islam, AWARE (the Association of Women for Action and Research) and the Islamic Religious Council of Singapore, criticized the book, considering it degenerate and disrespectful to both women and men. In particular, they disputed the club's assertion that if wives serve their husbands like "first class prostitutes" they will be able to maintain happy marriages. Critics argue that the behavior being promoted by the club involve objectification of women, and places an unfair burden on wives. They further argue it reduces Islamic marriage to merely sexual activity. A representative of the Islamic Religious Council of Singapore said that "happiness in a marriage goes beyond receiving sexual fulfillment from one's wife." Minister Shahrizat Jalil of the Women, Family and Community Development agreed, noting "To hinge fidelity, domestic violence and the fulfillment of a husband’s responsibilities purely on a wife's capacity to be obedient, stimulate sexual arousal … is not only demeaning to wives, but to husbands as well."

In conjunction with the launch of the book Islamic Sex, a stage performance glorifying Islamic sex took place. In the performance, the performers' claim that Islamic sex is "many times more amazing than the forbidden sex of the Jews" also raised eyebrows. The controversial book has also been published with the book subtitle "fighting Jews to return Islamic sex to the world".

The book was criticized for suggesting and encouraging group sex between a man and his multiple wives. However, this criticism has been disputed by the club, which alleged that the book merely mentions that a man who has "reached the highest spiritual capability can have sex with all his wives simultaneously, spiritually".

Berita Harian, a Malay-language newspaper revealed that the book has sexually explicit details on its pages, and also noted that chapter eight of the book deals with “how sex becomes worship”- baselessly claiming that sexual intercourse can be considered worship of God according to Islam. The leader of the banned Al-Arqam sect, Ashaari Muhammad, objected to extremely graphic content of the book.

In October 2011 the Mufti of Kelantan criticized the book, and reinforced the traditional Islamic values of modesty, chastity, sexual restraint and abstinence. The Mufti also stated that "Islam touches on sex [exclusively] in a civilized, polite and non-lewd manner", and that in Islam sex is described using allegorical terms. In November 2011, the Malaysian government banned the book.

== See also ==
- Al-Arqam
- Ashaari Mohammad
- Sex-positivity
- Hypersexuality
- Islam and Sexuality
- Women in Islam
- Islam in Malaysia
- Polygamy in Islam
