= Skin gap =

Human theory

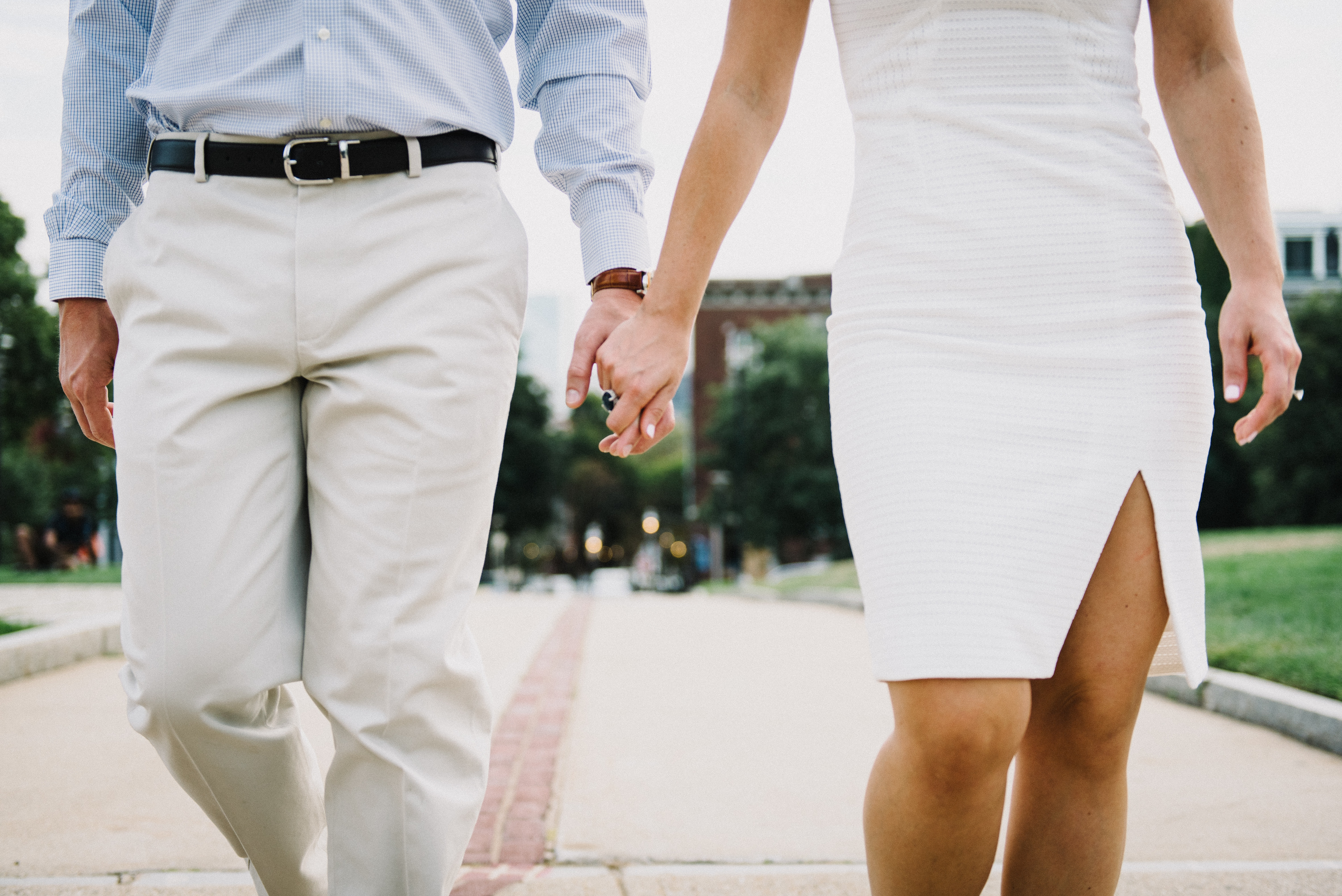
Couple holding hands in 2016.

The skin gap is the difference in the amount of skin that men and women are expected to show in the same social setting. The term was coined in 2016 by Allison Josephs of Jew in the City. Josephs observed that in Western culture in 2016, women were generally expected to wear less clothing than men. An exception was made for women who did not meet the conventional standard of beauty, for example older or heavyset women; otherwise, there was a great deal of social pressure on women to display their bodies.

Josephs suggested that this pressure contributed to widespread female body dissatisfaction, leading to depression, eating disorders, and cosmetic surgery. It also meant that Orthodox Jewish, Muslim, and other women who preferred to dress modestly had trouble finding clothing that met their needs.

Because women in some countries are forced to cover their bodies and faces, modest dress is often perceived as a symbol of oppression in Western culture even when a woman freely chooses to dress that way. There is a long history behind why specific groups of women choose to be more modest in comparison to the amount of skin that women are expected to show in Western culture. There are different types of cover-ups women wear including the shayla, al-amira, khimar, chador, niqab and the burqa cover ups. Each head scarf can range from the least covered, where only the hair is covered, to the most covered where the head, eyes and neck are out of sight.

In "Modesty, Objectification, and Disordered Eating Patterns: A Comparative Study between Veiled and Unveiled Muslim Women Residing in Kuwait", Al-Mutawa et al. wrote that "Muslim women who choose to wear the veil argue that an Islamic identity, including the use of traditional clothing and veils, de-emphasizes appearances and protects them from public scrutiny". The “U.S. Muslim Women and Body Image: Links Among Objectification Theory Constructs and the Hijab” article explains how studies in the United States show that Muslim women wear cover-ups as a way to express their true Muslim identity. Self-expression of a Muslim identity can be social reinforcement towards friends, family and society. A cover-up can help an individual gain respect and self-esteem. According to the study done by the Soor Center for Professional Therapy and Assessment, there is less objectification experienced by veiled women in comparison to unveiled women. This study argues that this modesty and lack of skin showing is what defies the societal norm created by the skin gap.

There are multiple factors that go into why women of non-Western cultures may choose to show less skin in comparison to the amount of skin that women are pressured or expected to show. In the article "Modesty and style in Islamic attire: Refashioning Muslim garments in a Western context", religious studies scholar Géraldine Mossière wrote that transitioning from wearing more androgynous clothing in the Islamic culture as a child, to the more modest and feminine clothing as a woman can be a type of ritual for growing up.

Josephs wrote that when she became an Orthodox Jew and began dressing modestly, she found that covering up made her feel empowered. Her article and short video prompted online discussions and were featured on websites such as Glossy and the Nachum Segal radio show. According to the study done by the Soor Center for Professional Therapy and Assessment, there is less objectification experienced by veiled and modest women in comparison to unveiled women. The choice that they have made to be veiled may be seen from a western perspective as though they are being oppressed, but in reality, many of these women have chosen to be covered up for their own personal reasons. Although cover ups can be for empowerment, personal preference, religious affiliation, or for cultural reasons, there has been challenges regarding the true meaning of a hijab and whether a cover-up is a form of sexual objectification or as a personal positive function.

== See also ==
- Body image
- Male gaze
- Modesty
