= Hijab =

Islamic head covering for women

The Hijab (Arabic: حجاب, romanized: ḥijāb, pronounced [ħɪˈdʒaːb]) is a term which signifies, within the Islamic literature, an inner sense of modesty, bashfulness, and reserve traditionally sanctified as haya, which is reflected in codes of dress and behavioral standards. It is also commonly used today to refer simply to the headscarf worn by Muslim women that covers the hair, neck, and ears while leaving the face exposed. Furthermore, within the framework of different interpretations or local understandings, this word can denote forms of covering that go beyond the headscarf whether more comprehensive or more relaxed. Traditional Muslim women's clothing style, determined by numerous interactions including tradition, necessities of life, geography and climate, and Islamic advice literature etc, has been reshaped through the hijab, presented as Islamic clothing in response to Western cultural influence; grown globally since the 1970s, with religious Muslims viewing it as a symbol of modesty and faith or a form of adornment.

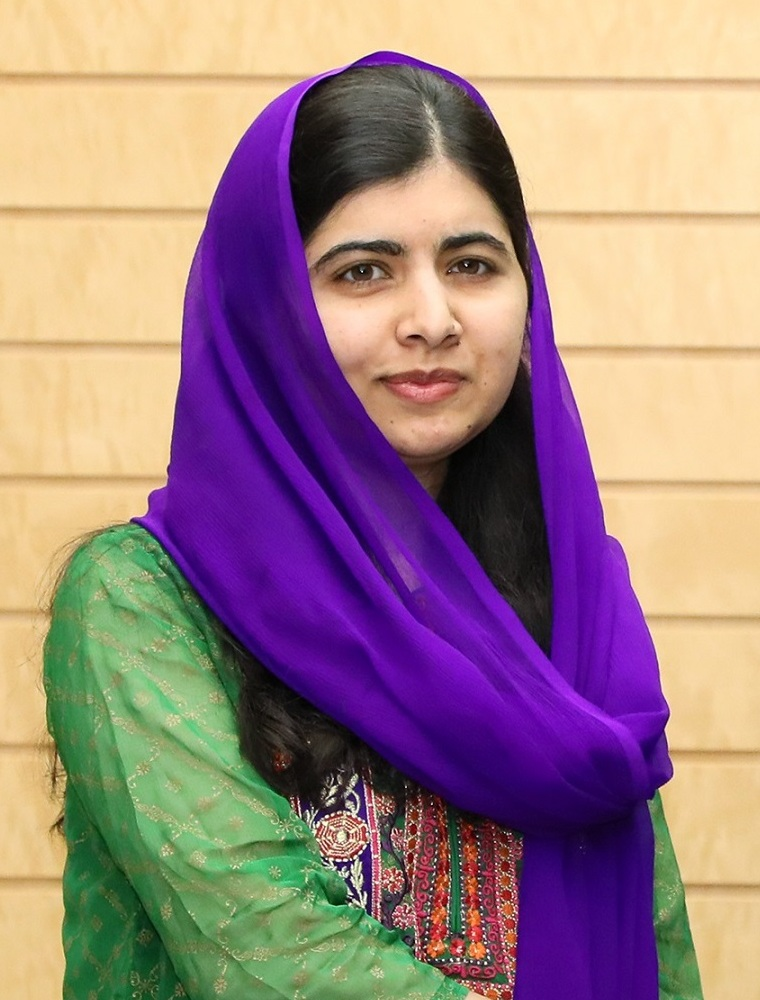
Malala Yousafzai, Pakistani education activist and 2014 Nobel Peace Prize laureate, wearing a loose head scarf

In the history of early Islamic practices —which serves as an ultimate model for many— the term hijab was used not to denote a style of dress, but rather to refer to a section of the house separated by a curtain (as exemplified in the Qur'an Al-Aḥzāb; 53) or a form of sentiment. (Note: Although the word in question appears eight times in the Qur'an, none of these instances occur in a context related to women's clothing.) Regarding women's attire, the Qur'an employs only the terms "khimār" —which some translators and exegetes prefer to render as "headscarf"— and jilbāb, an outer garment, in a few specific verses. These verses did not contain details regarding who should observe the practice of veiling, under what circumstances, in whose presence, or to what extent. These questions were raised by Islamic jurists in later periods and were answered and codified through a combination of anecdotes attributed to Muhammad and their own independent legal reasoning ijtihad. While Islamic scholars who follow classical jurisprudence argue that covering the head is a religious requirement in women's clothing, modernist thinkers and the Quran-centric approach that considers these sources to lack informational value do not consider it among Islamic obligations. Furthermore, scholars who maintain that the hijab is obligatory hold differing views regarding whether it mandates covering everything except the face and hands —when in the presence of non-mahrams— or requires covering the entire body, including the face and hands.

While in Iran and Afghanistan under the Taliban rule, the hijab is mandated by law, in other countries and places, its use is subjected to restrictions or bans. Because of these regulations and strict hijab practices, women may face repercussions for wearing in some countries and not wearing headscarf in others. This issue has the potential to be highly controversial not only in terms of women's social participation and status in Islamic life, but also from the perspective of human rights and international laws; because the participation of individuals wearing religiously symbolic clothings in judicial proceedings would call into question the principle of the conscientious independence and impartiality of judges, a fundamental principle in the judiciary.

== Terminology and influences ==
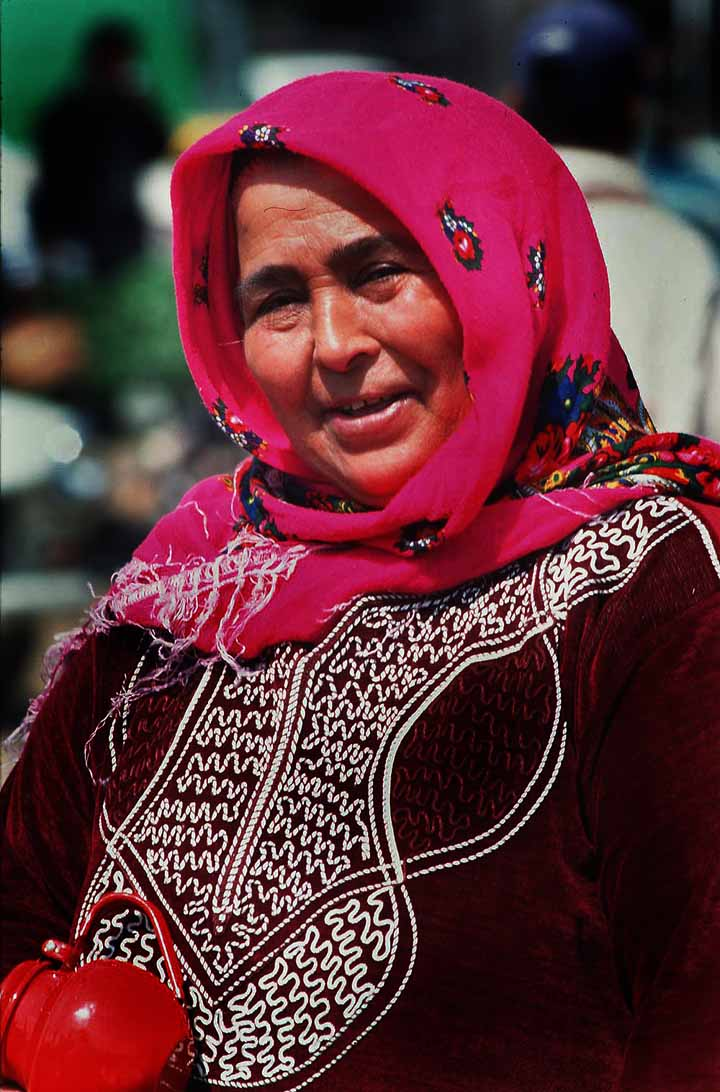
A Tunisian woman wearing a hijab

The Arabic word hijab (Arabic: حجاب) (lit. 'curtain, cloth barrier') is the verbal noun originating from the verb ﺣَﺠَﺐَ (hajaba), from the triliteral root ح ج ب (H-J-B), which forms a large class of words mostly relating to concepts of hiding, concealing, or blocking. The term ḥijāb was originally used to denote a partition and was sometimes later used for Islamic rules of modesty. While one usage in the Quran refers to the curtain separating Muhammad's wives from visitors, other usages refers to a metaphysical barrier separating man or the world from God. The Quran does not use the word hijab for women's clothing, but uses other terms such as jilbab (as an outer garment recommendation) and khimar (for discussions see below) in various contexts. The word in Turkish expresses an emotional state, shame, that is not related to clothing.

Much like the tichel or snood of observant Jewish women, the hanging veil, apostolnik, or kapp, worn by certain Christian women, and the dupatta favored in North Indian Hindu and Sikh cultures, the Islamic hijab is not monolithic, but manifests itself in diverse forms called by different names and shaped by local laws and customs as well as climatic-biological environment.

== In Islamic scripture ==
=== Qur'an ===
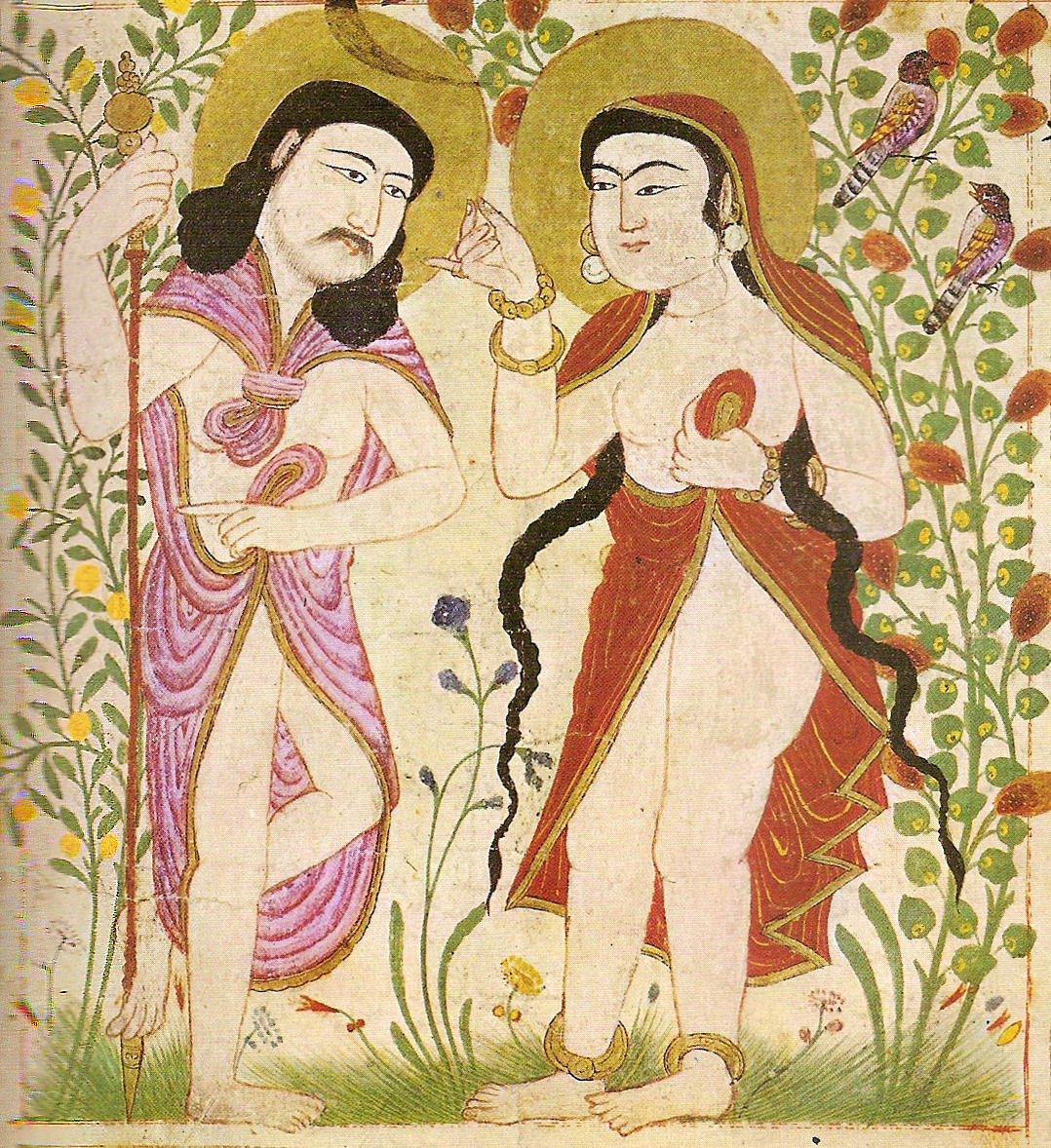
Painting from Manafi al-Hayawan, depicting Adam and Eve, Maragheh-Iran; Al A'raf -22: "When they tasted the fruit, their private parts became visible to them, and they began to cover themselves with leaves from Paradise."

A verse in the Surah Al-A'raf-26 gives the simplest and most fundamental purpose of dressing as covering one's intimate parts and emphasizes that fear of God is more important than covering oneself. There are seven verses in the Quran that refer in some way to women's clothing, and the two discussed below are ostensibly related to the form of clothing; The clearest verses on this topic are Surah An-Nur 24:30-31, telling both men and women to dress and act modestly, with more detail on women's position.

And tell the believing women to lower their gaze and guard their chastity, and not to reveal their ornaments except what normally appears. Let them draw their veils over their chests, and not reveal their ˹hidden˺ adornments except to their husbands, their fathers, their fathers-in-law, their sons, their stepsons, their brothers, their brothers' sons or sisters' sons, their fellow women, those ˹bondwomen˺ in their possession, male attendants with no desire, or children who are still unaware of women's nakedness.........

The "ornaments" in the verse has been interpreted and presented by some scholars as the parts that are adorned, and by others as the female body, with the potential to encompass the entire body. Meanwhile modesty is exalted in the Islamic understanding, the opposite behavior is despised as fahisha by Islamic scholars alike as emblematic of a state of spiritual ignorance Jahiliyyah. In Luxenberg's Syro-Aramaic Reading analysis on Qur'an, the part "Let them draw their veils over their chests" means literally as "snap their belts around their waists", an idiom, the belt was a symbol for chastity and does not order any organ to be covered with cloth. According to him, the meanings of the words in the relevant part of the verse are as follows: خِمار Khimar; cummerbund, جيب jyb; (Note: Google Translate gives similar pronunciations of this word with the same meaning in many languages; For example Turkish, Persian, Urdu, Greek, Pashto, Somali, Hungarian, Albanian, Georgian….) sinus, sac, وَلْيَضْرِبْنَ; "let them hit." (Note: One of the biggest difficulties in understanding the Quran for those who do not know its language may be shifts in linguistic usage over the centuries. Studies involving understanding, interpreting and translating the Quran can contain individual tendencies, reflections and even distortions caused by the region, sect, education, religious ideology and knowledge of the people who made them.) (See also:Revisionist school of Islamic studies) A statement ın Al-Aḥzāb: 59 is as follows;

O Prophet, tell your wives, your daughters, and the women of the believers to draw their cloaks (the plural form of jilbab (جَلَـٰبِيبِهِنَّ)) over themselves. That is more suitable "so that they will be recognized and not be harmed". And Allah is ever Forgiving and Merciful.

This was a statement that tells women to wear their "outer garments" when going out for various needs (such as defecation), interpreted by some as a command and by others as a recommendation of protective measures against sexual harassment in Medina. (Note: Beyza Bilgin states that the expression 'let them put their outer coverings over themselves' in the 59th verse of Al-Aḥzāb was revealed because they harassed women under the conditions of that day, considering them to be concubines, and commented as follows: "In other words, veiling is a security issue that arose according to the needs of that period. These are not taken into consideration at all and are reflected as God's command. Women have been called God's command for a thousand years. Women said the same thing to their daughters and daughters-in-law." She said the following about covering herself in prayer : "They tell me; 'Do you cover yourself while praying?' Of course, I cover up when I'm in congregation. I am obliged not to disturb the peace. But I also pray with my head uncovered in my own home. Because the Quran's requirement for prayer is not covering up, but ablution and turning towards the qibla. This is a thousand year old issue. It's so ingrained in us. But this should definitely not be underestimated. Because people do it thinking it is God's command. But on the other hand, we should not declare a person who does not cover up as a bad woman.")

Those who perceived the statement as a command were also divided into two; while most scholars consider it won't to include face, a small group arguing that "the purpose of the veil is to prevent women from being recognized", hence the face is included. The statement in question is as follows: (ذَٰلِكَ أَدْنَىٰٓ أَن يُعْرَفْنَ فَلَا يُؤْذَيْنَ) literally "so that they will be recognized and not be harmed." In order to understand the expression, some narrations can give clues about the sociological infrastructure of the period. It is reported that Umar prohibited female slaves from resembling free women by covering their hair, no different from earlier social practices in which noble women who could wear ornate female headdresses were easily distinguished from slaves as in Mesopotamia, Assyria and ancient Greece. According to well-known explanation of the verse, by Al-Qurtubi the verse was an expression directed towards free and Muslim women, not slaves or non-Muslim women, for which Tabari cites Ibn Abbas. Ibn Kathir states that the jilbab was distinguishing free Muslim women from those of Jahiliyyah, so other men know they are free women and not slaves or prostitutes, so they are not harassed.

Some later scholars like Ibn Hayyan, Ibn Hazm and Muhammad Nasiruddin al-Albani questioned the quoted explanation. Their reasons were that slaves were not explicitly excluded in the verse or hadith, and that they could attract lust more easily, and that the prohibition of adultery and molestation should also apply to slaves. What is said about the dimensions of the Jilbab varies; While Qurtubi reports that jilbab covers the whole body, Ibn Arabi considered that excessive covering would make impossible for a woman to be recognised, which the verse mentions.

=== During Muhammad's lifetime ===
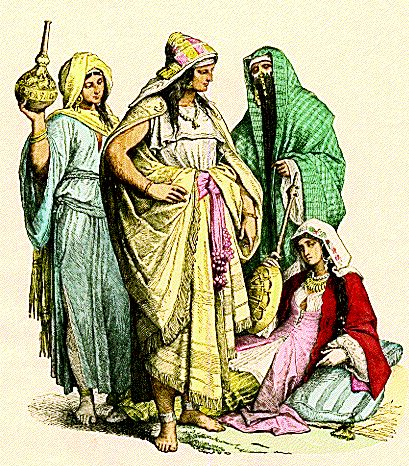
Early costumes of free, Arab women; philological research indicates that concepts such as "Ma'ruf" and "munkar" -which appear as frequently recurring mottos in the Quran— underwent a process of "Islamization." While "maʿruf " and "munkar" originally signified behaviors that were socially accepted or rejected across various historical contexts and geographical regions ie variable Urf, the terms would come to denote behaviors approved or rejected by Islamic jurists, fairly constant, ahkam

The word ḥijāb in the Qur'an refers not to women's clothing but to a spatial partition or curtain as in other early Islamic texts in literal usage while in other cases the word denotes separation between deity and mortals (42:51), wrongdoers and righteous (7:46, 41:5), believers and unbelievers (17:45), and light from darkness (38:32). Available evidence suggests that veiling was not introduced into Arabia by Muhammad, but already existed there, particularly in the towns, although it was probably not as widespread as in the neighbouring countries such as Syria and Palestine. Similarly to the practice among Greeks, Byzantines, Jews, and Assyrians, its use was associated with high social status. (Note: It is reported that Umar prohibited female slaves from resembling free women by covering their hair.)

The Quran in Sura 33:53 which is believed to have been revealed in 627; states, "And when you ask [his wives] for something, ask them from behind a hijab (partition). That is purer for your hearts and their hearts". As Muhammad's influence increased, he entertained more and more visitors in the mosque, which was then his home. Often, these visitors stayed the night only feet away from his wives' apartments. It is commonly understood that this verse was intended to protect his wives from these strangers. This is understood as not requiring slave women to wear veils and is supported by tradition.

Some have also offered different interpretations of this barrier; A visual barrier between Muhammad's family and the surrounding community, a physical barrier is used to create a space that provides comfort and privacy for individuals, and an ethical barrier, such as in the expression purity of hearts in reference to Muhammad's wives and the Muslim men to make something forbidden.

The Assembly of the Forty, or Council of the Forty, is a communal worship ceremony in Alevism and Bektashism that is said to have been attended by Muhammad upon his return from the Mi'raj. Unlike the classic Sunni Miraj stories, the story tells of Muhammad being removed from his role as a person who brought God's commands, and how he was able to enter the realm of meeting with God by giving his ring, which contained the seal of prophethood, to a lion. In the stories, alongside the understanding developed by Islamic theology that God cannot be likened to or enter into any created being, there are short references challenging traditional Sunni positions such as prayer, alcohol prohibition, separation of men and women, and veiling practises in Islam.

=== Hadith ===
The Hadiths sources specify the details of hijab for men and women, exegesis of the Qur'anic verses attributed to the sahabah, and are a major source which Muslim legal scholars used to derive rulings. Sahih al-Bukhari records Aisha saying:

`Umar bin Al-Khattab used to say to Allah's Messenger "Let your wives be veiled" But he did not do so. The wives of the Prophet used to go out to answer the call of nature at night only at Al-Manasi.' Once Sauda, the daughter of Zam`a, went out and she was a tall woman. `Umar bin Al-Khattab saw her while he was in a gathering, and said, "I have recognized you, O Sauda!" He said so as he was anxious for some Divine orders regarding the veil. So Allah revealed the Verse of veiling.

Aisha also reported that when Quran 24:31 was revealed,

...the men of Ansar went to the women of Ansar and recited to them the words Allah had revealed. Each man recited to his wife, his daughter, his sister and other female relatives. Each woman among them got up, took her decorated wrapper and wrapped herself up in it out of faith and belief in what Allah had revealed. They appeared behind the Messenger of Allah wrapped up, as if there were crows on their heads.

Although these narrations imply black clothing, other narrations indicate wives of Muhammad also wore other colored-clothes like yellow or rose.

==== Shape and extent according to hadiths ====
- Safiya bint Shaiba, said that 'A'ishah mentioned the women of Ansar, praised them and said good words about them. She then said: When Surat an-Nur came down, they took the curtains, tore them and made head covers (veils) of them.32:4091. This hadith is often translated as "...and covered their heads and faces with the cut pieces of cloth," Some commentators, such as Ibn Hajar al-Asqalani in Fatḥ al-Bārī, claimed that covering also covers the face, based on the word (Arabic: فَاخْتَمَرْنَ) in the text of this hadith.
- According to some hadiths from Bukhari, Abu Dawud and Nasai, during the time of Muhammad, male and female Muslims were performing ablution from the same water bowl. "We used to perform ablution collectively, men and women, by lowering and dipping our hands into the same bowl." indicating that women could perform ablution in the presence of men. In this case, the arms up to the elbows, feet, face and the part of the head that are essential for ablution and wiping can be considered as free zones.

==== In prayer ====
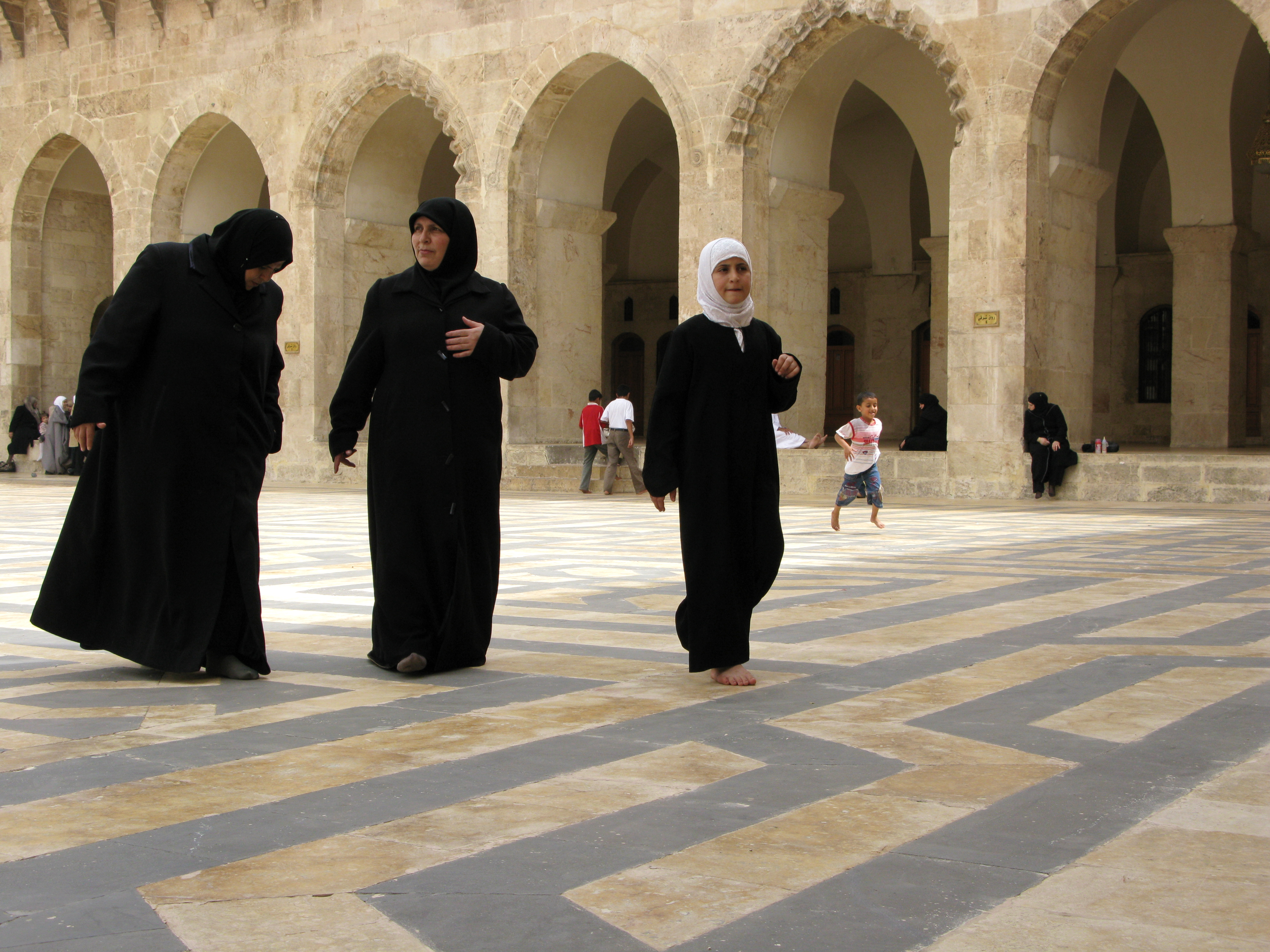
Syrian women in hijabs, Great Mosque of Aleppo

- Yahya related to me from Malik from Muhammad ibn Zayd ibn Qunfudh that his mother asked Umm Salama, the wife of the Prophet, may Allah bless him and grant him peace, "What clothes can a woman wear in prayer?" She said, "She can pray in the khimār and the diri' (Arabic: الدِّرْعِ, lit. 'shield, armature', transl. 'a woman's garment') that reaches down and covers the top of her feet."
- Aishah narrated that Allah's Messenger said: "The Salat of a woman who has reached the age of menstruation is not accepted without a khimār."

== Dress code in sharia ==
Classical fiqh have differed as how to understand Qur'anic verses on clothing; Sunni and Shia scholars say hijab is mandatory, while Ismaili, accounting for ~0.25% of all Muslims, do not. Besides that traditional scholars had different opinions on covering the hands and face. Muslim scholars usually require women to cover everything but their hands and face in public, but do not require the niqab (a face covering worn by some Muslim women). In nearly all Muslim cultures, pre-pubescent girls are not required to wear a hijab.

In private, and in the presence of close relatives (mahrams), rules on dress relax. However, in the presence of the husband, most scholars stress the importance of mutual freedom and pleasure of the husband and wife.

Some scholars argue that beyond the body of a woman, her voice is also a part of her "awrah" and should not be heard by men outside her immediate family. They cite some hadiths citing women's voices as a source of temptation and fitna (charmingness, attractiveness) and should be kept private and some verse interpretations.

=== Sunni ===
Afghan army and police officials wearing hijabs in Kandahar, Afghanistan, 2012

In Sunni tradition, scholarly consensus (ijma') has discerned hijab is mandatory. The four major Sunni schools of thought (Hanafi, Shafi'i, Maliki and Hanbali) believe that it is obligatory for free women to cover their hair, and the entire body except her face and hands, while in the presence of people of the opposite sex other than close family members.

According to Hanafis, these requirements extend to being around non-Muslim women as well, for fear that they may describe her physical features to unrelated men. The Sunni Permanent Committee for Islamic Research and Issuing Fatwas in Saudi Arabia, and Muhammad ibn Adam Al-Kawthari also believe women should cover their head.

Men must cover from their belly buttons to their knees, though the schools differ on whether this includes covering the navel and knees or only what is between them.

=== Shia ===
In Shia jurisprudence, by consensus, it is obligatory for women to cover their hair, and the entire body except her hands and face, while in the presence of people of the opposite sex other than close family members. The major and most important Shia hadith collections such as Nahj Al-Balagha and Kitab Al-Kafi for the most part do not give any details about hijab requirements. However a quotation from the Shia Fiqh book Man La Yahduruhu al-Faqih Musa al-Kadhim in reply to his brother makes reference to female hijab requirements during the salat (prayer), stating "She covers her body and head with it then prays. And if her feet protrude from beneath, and she doesn't have the means to prevent that, there is no harm".

=== Modern approaches ===
Modern approaches to this issue emerge under the influence of a series of social and intellectual developments, from the re-evaluation of religious sources and the questioning of sources that establish a androcentric / misogynist religious understanding to the protection of women's individual dignity, freedom and rights.

Notable Muslim scholars who do not believe the hijab is an obligation include Iraqi Islamic scholar Abdullah al Judai, mufti Mahmud Shaltut, Shaykh Mustafa Ghalayini, Shabir Ally, Khaled Abou El Fadl, Javed Ahmad Ghamidi, Abdullah bin Bayyah, Ahmad Ghabel, and Nasr Abu Zayd. Like these scholars, others like Zaki Badawi and Gamal al-Banna have also adopted positions in stark contrast to the current mainstream position. Grand Ayatollah Reza Hosseini Nassab is to date, the only Marja' to not consider the covering of Muslim women's hair with hijab to be obligatory.

Clothing does not play a key role in Quranism. All Quranist movements agree that Islam has no sets of traditional clothing, except for the rules described in the Quran. Therefore, beards and the hijab are not necessary. Modernist thinkers including Karen Armstrong, Reza Aslan and Leila Ahmed, believe the requirements of the hijab were initially intended solely for Muhammad's wives, serving to preserve their sanctity. This was because Muhammad conducted religious and civic matters in the mosque next to his home. Leila Ahmed further explains that Muhammad aimed at fostering a sense of privacy and protecting the intimate space of his wives from the constant presence of the bustling community at their doorstep. They argue that the term darabat al-hijab ('taking the veil') was used synonymously and interchangeably with 'becoming Prophet Muhammad's wife' and that during Muhammad's life no other Muslim woman wore the hijab. Aslan suggests that Muslim women started to wear the hijab to emulate Muhammad's wives, who are revered as "Mothers of the Believers" in Islam.

Khaled Abou El Fadl argues that all Islamic moderates agree that, in all cases, the decision whether to wear the hijab should be a woman's autonomous decision and that her choice must be respected because the moderate pro-choice position is based on the Quranic teachings that there ought to be no compulsion in religion.

Some traditionalist Muslim scholars accept the contemporary views and arguments as those hadith sources are not sahih and ijma would no longer be applicable if it is argued by scholars (even if it is argued by only one scholar). Notable examples of traditionalist Muslim scholars who accept these contemporary views include the Indonesian scholar Quraish Shihab.

== History ==
=== Pre-Islamic veiling practices ===
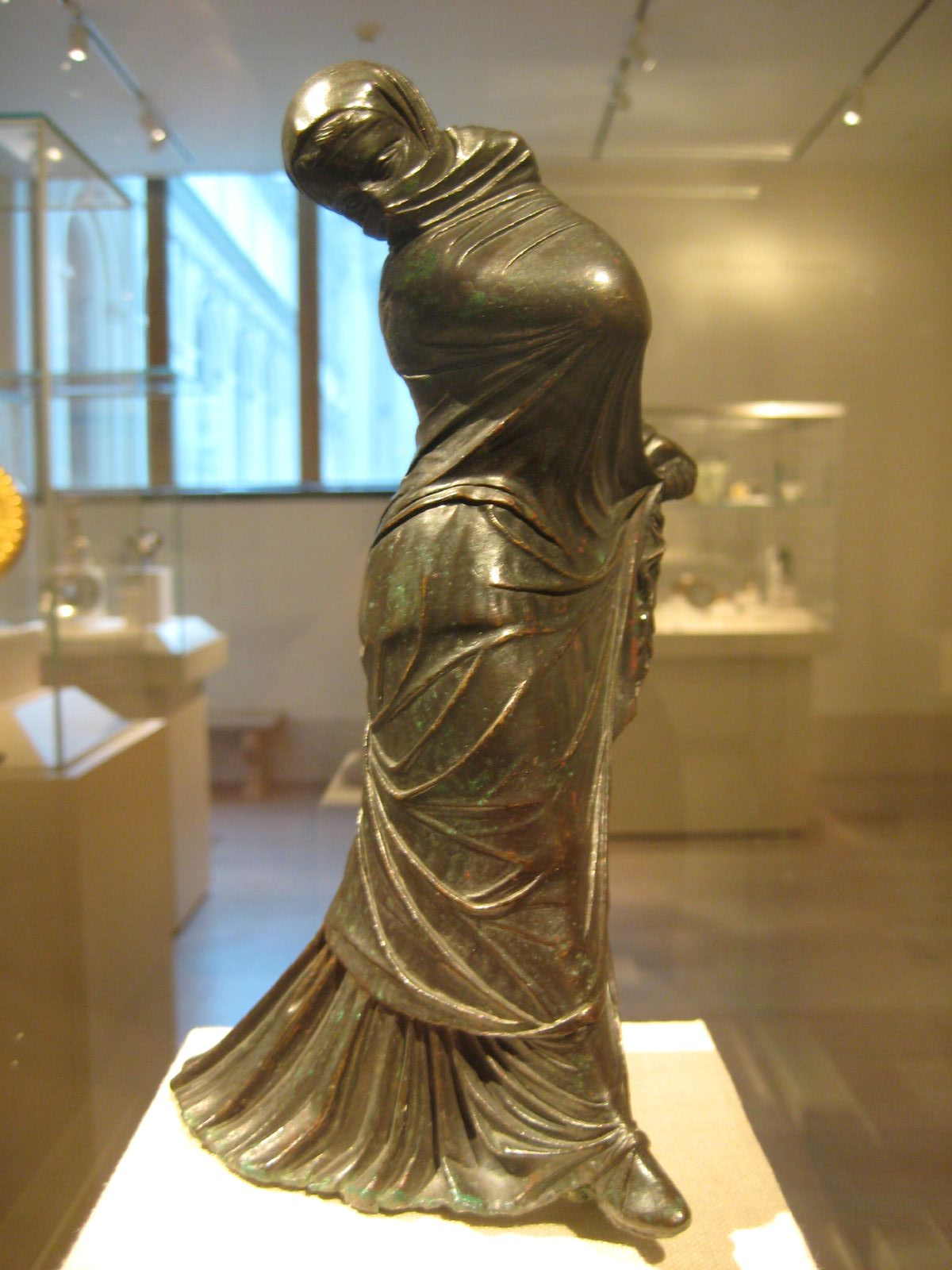
Greek bronze statuette of a veiled and masked dancer, 2nd–3rd century BC

Veiling did not originate with the advent of Islam. Statuettes depicting veiled priestesses date back as far as 2500 BC. Elite women in ancient Mesopotamia and in the Byzantine, Greek, and Persian empires wore the veil as a sign of respectability and high status. In ancient Mesopotamia, Assyria had explicit sumptuary laws detailing which women must veil and which women must not, depending upon the woman's class, rank, and occupation in society. Female slaves and prostitutes were forbidden to veil and faced harsh penalties if they did so. Veiling was thus not only a marker of aristocratic rank, but also served to "differentiate between 'respectable' women and those who were publicly available".

Strict seclusion and the veiling of matrons were also customary in ancient Greece. Between 550 and 323 BCE, prior to Christianity, respectable women in classical Greek society were expected to seclude themselves and wear clothing that concealed them from the eyes of strange men. Roman pagan custom included the practice of the head covering worn by the priestesses of Vesta (Vestal Virgins).

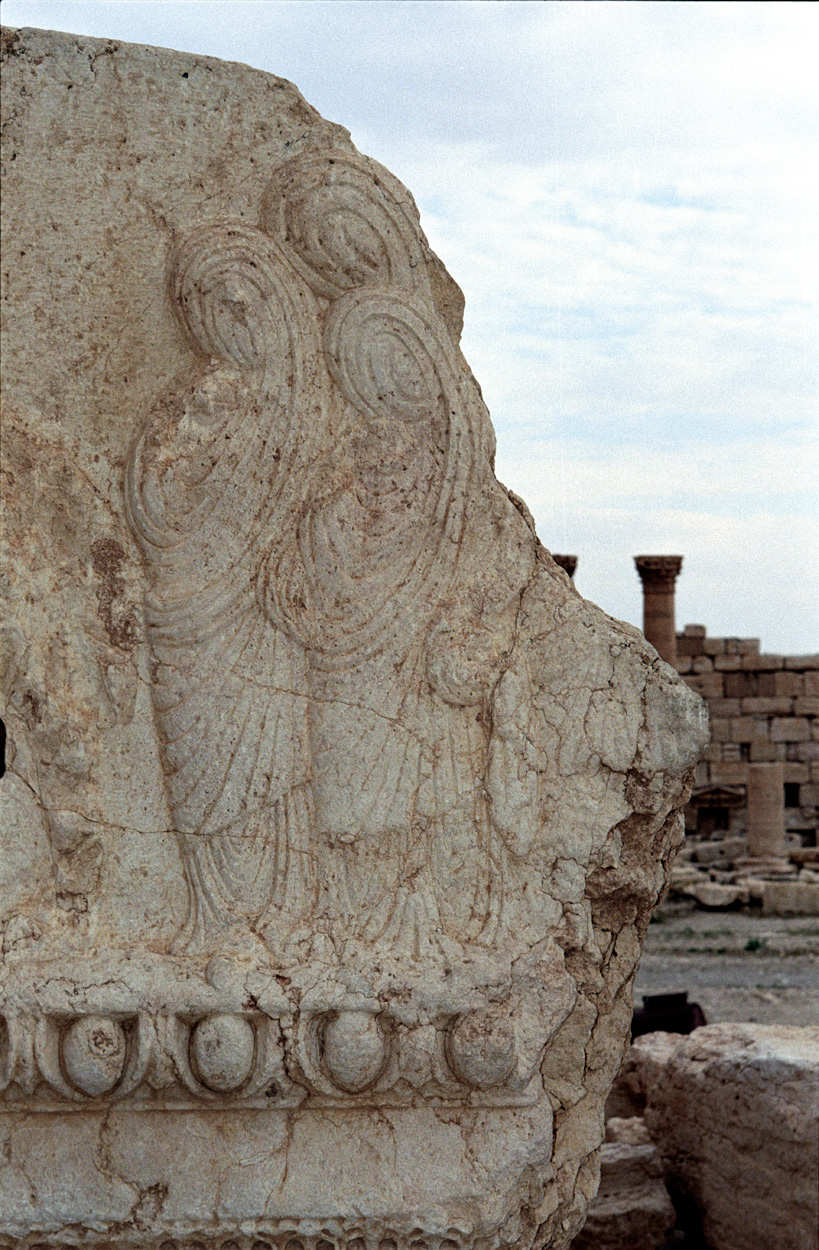
Pre-Islamic relief showing veiled women, Temple of Baal, Palmyra, Syria, 1st century CE

It is not clear whether the Hebrew Bible contains prescriptions with regard to veiling, but rabbinic literature presents it as a question of modesty (tzniut). Modesty became an important rabbinic virtue in the early Roman period, and it may have been intended to distinguish Jewish women from their non-Jewish counterparts in Babylonian and later in Greco-Roman society. According to rabbinical precepts, married Jewish women have to cover their hair (cf. Mitpaḥat). The surviving representations of veiled Jewish women may reflect general Roman customs rather than particular Jewish practices. According to Fadwa El Guindi, at the inception of Christianity, Jewish women were veiling their heads and faces.

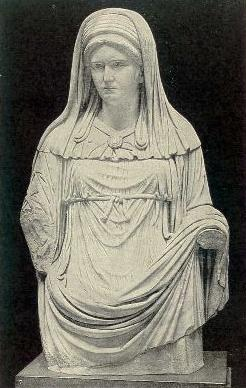
Roman statue of a Vestal Virgin

The best-known view on Christian headcovering is delineated in the Bible within the passage in 1 Corinthians 11:4–7, which states that "every woman who prays or prophesies with her head uncovered dishonors her head". The early Church Fathers, including Tertullian of Carthage, Clement of Alexandria, Hippolytus of Rome, John Chrysostom and Augustine of Hippo attested in their writings that Christian women should wear a headcovering, while men should pray with their heads uncovered. There is archaeological evidence demonstrating that headcovering was observed as an ordinance by women in early Christianity, and the practice of Christian headcovering continues among female adherents of many Christian denominations today, especially among Anabaptist Christians, as well as among certain Eastern Orthodox Christians, Oriental Orthodox Christians and Reformed Christians, among others.

In the Indian subcontinent, some Hindu women cover their heads and face with a veil in a practice known as ghoonghat.

Intermixing of populations resulted in a convergence of the cultural practices of Greek, Persian, and Mesopotamian empires and the Semitic peoples of the Middle East. Veiling and seclusion of women appear to have established themselves among Jews and Christians before spreading to urban Arabs of the upper classes and eventually among the urban masses. In the rural areas it was common to cover the hair, but not the face.

According to Leila Ahmed, the rigid norms pertaining to veiling and seclusion of women found in Christian Byzantine literature had been influenced by ancient Persian traditions, and there is evidence to suggest that they differed significantly from actual practice. Leila Ahmed argues that "Whatever the cultural source or sources, a fierce misogyny was a distinct ingredient of Mediterranean and eventually Christian thought in the centuries immediately preceding the rise of Islam."

=== Later pre-modern history ===
Among the first accounts of Islamic veiling is that of Du Huan a Chinese prisoner-of-war who travelled the Islamic world between 751 and 762. Such an early date means Du Huan's account predates the development of the madhhabs. Describing the public customs of Abbasid women, he wrote:

女子出門，必擁蔽其面，無問貴賤

When a woman goes out in public, she must cover her face, irrespective of her lofty or lowly social position.

— Tongdian,Volume 193

During the history of slavery in the Muslim world, it is known that female slaves did show themselves unveiled. Slave women were visually identified by their way of dress. While Islamic law dictated that a free Muslim woman should veil herself entirely, except for her face and hands, in order to hide her awrah (intimate parts) and avoid sexual harassment, the awrah of slave women were defined differently, and she was only to cover between her navel and her knee. This difference became even more prominent during the Abbasid Caliphate, when free Muslim women, in particular those of the upper classes, were subjected to even more sex segregation and harem seclusion, in contrast to the qiyan slave artists, who performed unveiled in male company.

The practice of veiling was borrowed from the elites of the Byzantine and Persian empires, where it was a symbol of respectability and high social status, during the Arab conquests of those empires. Reza Aslan argues that "The veil was neither compulsory nor widely adopted until generations after Muhammad's death, when a large body of male scriptural and legal scholars began using their religious and political authority to regain the dominance they had lost in society as a result of the Prophet's egalitarian reforms".

Because Islam identified with the monotheistic religions of the conquered empires, the practice was adopted as an appropriate expression of Qur'anic ideals regarding modesty and piety. Veiling gradually spread to upper-class Arab women, and eventually it became widespread among Muslim women in cities throughout the Middle East. Veiling of Arab Muslim women became especially pervasive under Ottoman rule as a mark of rank and exclusive lifestyle, and Istanbul of the 17th century witnessed differentiated dress styles that reflected geographical and occupational identities. Women in rural areas were much slower to adopt veiling because the garments interfered with their work in the fields. Since wearing a veil was impractical for working women, "a veiled woman silently announced that her husband was rich enough to keep her idle."

By the 19th century, upper-class urban Muslim and Christian women in Egypt wore a garment which included a head cover and a burqa (muslin cloth that covered the lower nose and the mouth). The name of this garment, harabah, derives from early Christian and Judaic religious vocabulary, which may indicate the origins of the garment itself. Up to the first half of the twentieth century, rural women in the Maghreb and Egypt put on a form of niqab when they visited urban areas, "as a sign of civilization".

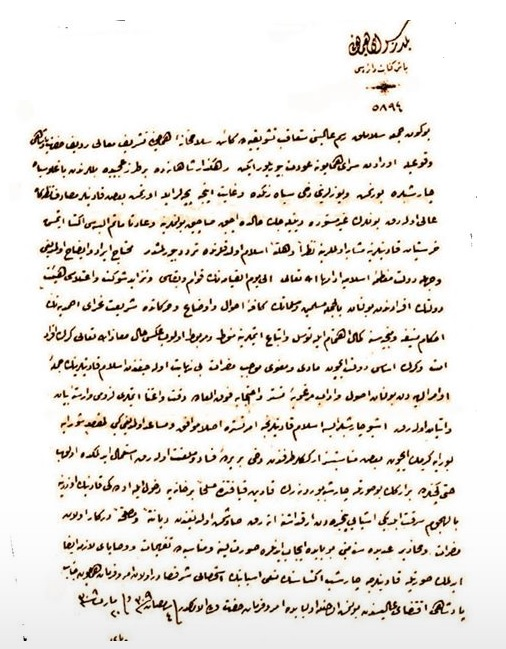
Abdulhamid II's decree dated April 2, 1892, prohibited by the wearing of Çarşaf

=== Modern history ===
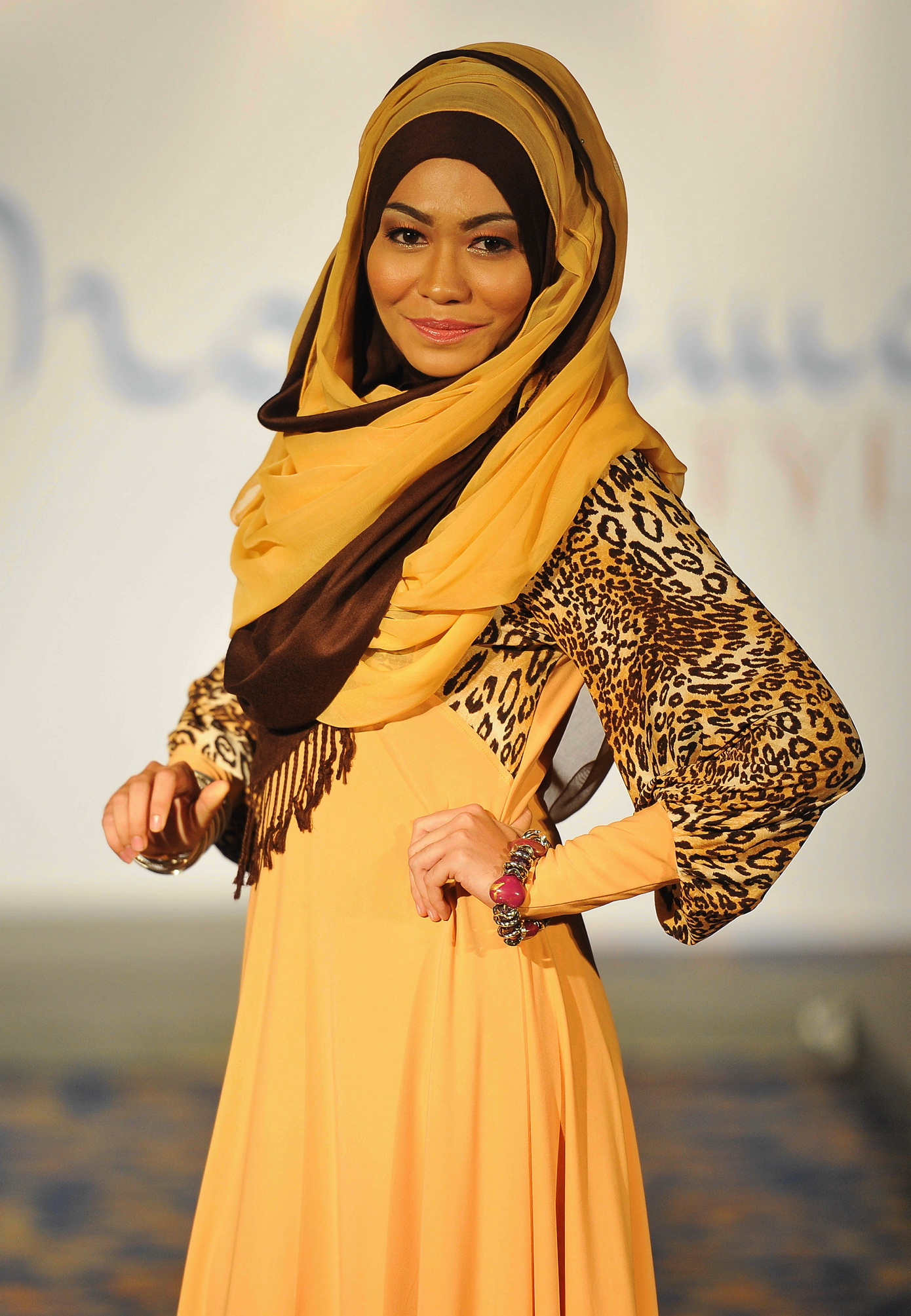
A model displaying a fashionable hijab at "Moslema In Style Fashion Show" in Kuala Lumpur, Malaysia

Western clothing largely dominated fashion in Muslim countries in the 1960s and 1970s. For example, in Pakistan, Afghanistan and Iran, some women wore short skirts, flower printed hippie dresses, or flared trousers. This changed following the military dictatorship in Pakistan, and Iranian revolution of 1979, when traditional conservative attire including the abaya, jilbab and niqab made a comeback. There were demonstrations in Iran in March 1979 after the hijab law, decreeing that women in Iran would have to wear scarves to leave the house, was brought in. However, this phenomenon did not happen in all countries with a significant Muslim population; in Turkey there has been a decline on women wearing the hijab in recent years, although under Erdoğan Turkey is becoming more conservative and Islamic, as Turkey repeals the 1982 headscarf ban in public sector, and the founding of new fashion companies catering to women who want to dress more conservatively.

Egyptian leader President Gamal Abdel Nasser claimed that, in 1953, he was told by the leader of the Muslim Brotherhood organization that they wanted to enforce the wearing of the hijab, to which Nasser responded, "Sir, I know you have a daughter in college, and she doesn't wear a headscarf or anything! Why don't you make her wear the headscarf? So you can't make one girl, your own daughter, wear it, and yet you want me to go and make ten million women wear it?"

The late-twentieth century saw a resurgence of the hijab in Egypt after a long period of decline as a result of westernization. Already in the mid-1970s some college aged Muslim men and women began a movement meant to reunite and rededicate themselves to the Islamic faith. This movement was named the Sahwah, or awakening, and sparked a period of heightened religiosity that began to be reflected in the dress code. The uniform adopted by the young female pioneers of this movement was named al-Islāmī (Islamic dress) and was made up of an "al-jilbāb—an unfitted, long-sleeved, ankle-length gown in austere solid colors and thick opaque fabric—and al-khimār, a head cover resembling a nun's wimple that covers the hair low to the forehead, comes under the chin to conceal the neck, and falls down over the chest and back". In addition to the basic garments that were mostly universal within the movement, additional measures of modesty could be taken depending on how conservative the followers wished to be. Some women choose to also utilize a face covering (niqāb) that leaves only eye slits for sight, as well as both gloves and socks in order to reveal no visible skin.

Soon this movement expanded outside of the youth realm and became a more widespread Muslim practice. Women viewed this way of dress as a way to both publicly announce their religious beliefs as well as a way to simultaneously reject Western influences of dress and culture that were prevalent at the time. Despite many criticisms of the practice of hijab being oppressive and detrimental to women's equality, many Muslim women view the way of dress to be a positive thing. It is seen as a way to avoid harassment and unwanted sexual advances in public and works to desexualize women in the public sphere in order to instead allow them to enjoy equal rights of complete legal, economic, and political status. This modesty was not only demonstrated by their chosen way of dress but also by their serious demeanor which worked to show their dedication to modesty and Islamic beliefs.

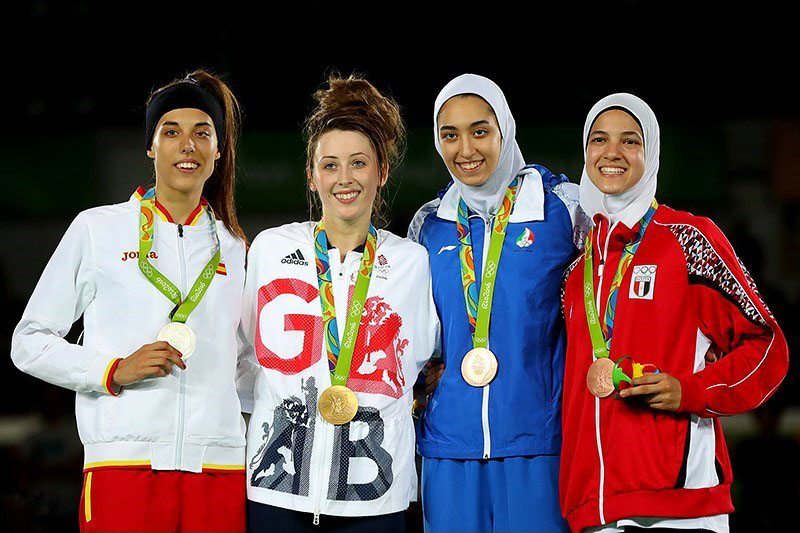
Taekwondo medalists from Spain, Britain, Iran and Egypt at Rio Olympics, 2016

Controversy erupted over the practice. Many people, both men and women from backgrounds of both Islamic and non-Islamic faith questioned the hijab and what it stood for in terms of women and their rights. There was questioning of whether in practice the hijab was truly a female choice or if women were being coerced or pressured into wearing it.

As the awakening movement gained momentum, its goals matured and shifted from promoting modesty towards more of a political stance in terms of retaining support for Pan-Islamism and a symbolic rejection of Western culture and norms. Today the hijab means many different things for different people. For Islamic women who choose to wear the hijab it allows them to retain their modesty, morals and freedom of choice.

After the September 11 attacks, the discussion and discourse on the hijab in Western nations intensified as Islamic traditions and theology came under greater scrutiny, with Hijabis facing extensive discrimination. According to the Harvard University Pluralism Project: "Some Muslim women cover their head only during prayer in the mosque; other Muslim women wear the hijab; still others may cover their head with a turban or a loosely draped scarf."

== Contemporary practice ==
Wearing or not wearing a hijab can also be an act of protest. In August 2014 a mother of one of the Camp Speicher massacre victims threw her headscarf at the Iraqi parliament speaker, Salim al-Jabouri.

The styles and practices of hijab vary widely across the world. An opinion poll conducted in 2014 by The University of Michigan's Institute for Social Research asked residents of seven Muslim-majority countries (Egypt, Iraq, Lebanon, Tunisia, Turkey, Pakistan, and Saudi Arabia) which style of women's dress they considered to be most appropriate in public. The survey found that the headscarf (in its tightly- or loosely-fitting form) was chosen by the majority of respondents in Egypt, Iraq, Tunisia and Turkey. The response rate for people of Turkey was just about 60%. In Saudi Arabia, 63% gave preference to the niqab face veil; in Pakistan the niqab, the full-length chador robe and the headscarf, received about a third of the votes each; while in Lebanon half of the respondents in the sample (which included Christians and Druze) opted for no head covering at all. The survey found "no significant difference" in the preferences between surveyed men and women, except in Pakistan, where more men favoured conservative women's dress. However, women more strongly support women's right to choose how to dress. People with university education are less conservative in their choice than those without one, and more supportive of women's right to decide their dress style, except in Saudi Arabia.

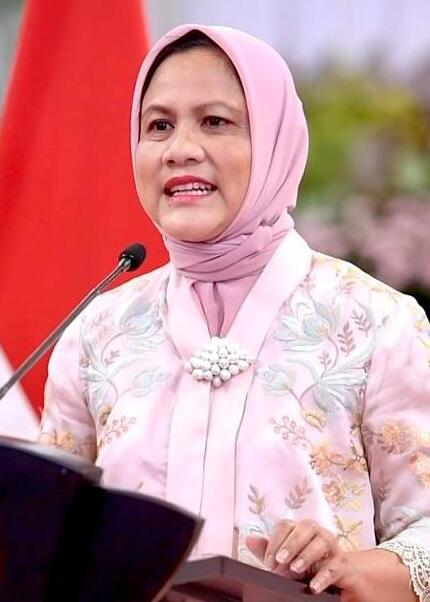
Iriana, former first lady of Indonesia wearing a turban

Some fashion-conscious women have been turning to non-traditional forms of hijab such as turbans. While some regard turbans as a proper head cover, others argue that it cannot be considered a proper Islamic veil if it leaves the neck exposed.

In Iran, where wearing the hijab is legally required, many women push the boundaries of the state-mandated dress code, risking a fine or a spell in detention. The former Iranian president Hassan Rouhani had vowed to rein in the morality police and their presence on the streets decreased during his term of office, but the powerful conservative forces in the country resisted his efforts, and the dress codes are still enforced, especially during the summer months.

After Ebrahim Raisi became president, he started imposing hijab laws strictly, announcing use of facial recognition in public transport to enforce hijab law. An Iranian woman, Mahsa Amini, died in custody of 'morality police' after they arrested her on new stricter hijab laws, which led to widespread protests. Women's resistance in Iran is gaining traction as an increasing number of women challenge the mandatory wearing of the hijab. Smith (2017) addressed the progress that Iranian women have made in her article, "Iran surprises by realizing Islamic dress code for women," published by The Times, a news organization based in the UK. The Iranian government has enforced their penal dress codes less strictly and instead of imprisonment as a punishment have implemented mandatory reform classes in the liberal capital, Tehran. General Hossein Rahimi, the Tehran's police chief stated, "Those who do not observe the Islamic dress code will no longer be taken to detention centers, nor will judicial cases be filed against them" (Smith, 2017). The remarks of Tehran's recent police chief in 2017 reflect political progress in contrast with the remarks of Tehran's 2006 police chief. Iranian women activists have made a headway since 1979 relying on fashion to enact cultural and political change.

In Turkey the hijab was formerly banned in private and state universities and schools. The ban applied not to the scarf wrapped around the neck, traditionally worn by Anatolian villager women, but to the head covering pinned neatly at the sides, called türban in Turkey, which has been adopted by a growing number of educated urban women since the 1980s. As of the mid-2000s, over 60% of Turkish women covered their head outside home. However the majority of those wear a traditional, non-Islamic head covering and only 11% wore a türban. The ban was lifted from universities in 2008, from government buildings in 2013, and from schools in 2014.

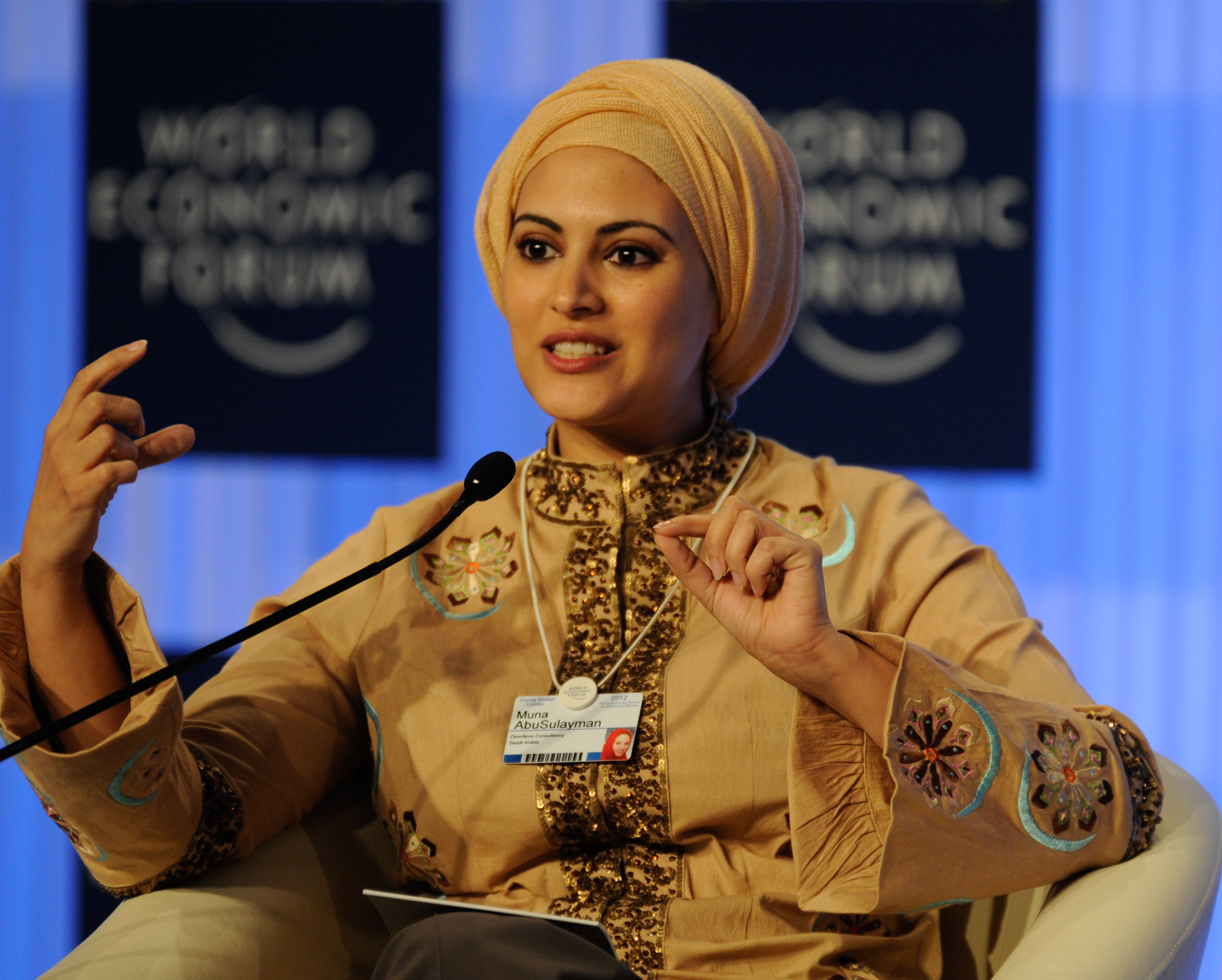
Muna AbuSulayman wearing a turban

The hijab is also a common cultural practice for Muslims in the West. For example, in a 2016 Environics poll, a large majority (73%) of Canadian Muslim women reported wearing some sort of head-covering in public (58% wear the hijab, 13% wear the chador and 2% wear the niqab). Wearing a head covering in public had increased since the 2006 survey. For an example of cultural importance, Gymshark and Leana Deeb released a modest workout outfit collection including hijabs.

Women who wear the Hijab may be called "hijabi".

Meanwhile, in a Pew Research Center poll from 2011, most Muslim American women also reported wearing hijab, 36% indicating they wore hijab whenever they were in public, with an additional 24% saying they wore it most or some of the time; 40% said they never wore hijab.

== Around the world ==
Map showing prevalence of hijab wearing across the world and indicating countries where there are restrictions on wearing it

Some governments encourage and even oblige women to wear the hijab, while others have banned it in at least some public settings. In many parts of the world women also experience informal pressure for or against wearing the hijab, including physical attacks.

=== Legal enforcement ===
In Gaza, there was a campaign by religious conservatives such as Hamas to impose the hijab on women during the First Intifada. In 1990, the Unified National Leadership of the Uprising (UNLU) declared that it rejected the imposition of a hijab policy for women, and targeted those who seek to impose the hijab, but that declaration was argued to have come too late, as many women had already yielded to the pressure in order to avoid harassment. After assuming the government in the Gaza Strip in June 2007, Hamas sought to enforce Islamic law, imposing the hijab on women at courts, institutions and schools.

Iran transitioned from banning veils in 1936 to mandating Islamic dress for women following the 1979 Islamic Revolution. By 1980, veiling was required in government and educational settings, with the 1983 penal code imposing 74 lashes for not adhering to the hijab, though the exact requirements were unclear. This led to public tensions and vigilante actions regarding proper hijab. Subsequent regulations in 1984 and 1988 clarified dress-code standards, and the current penal code prescribes fines or prison terms for failing to observe hijab, without detailing its specific form.

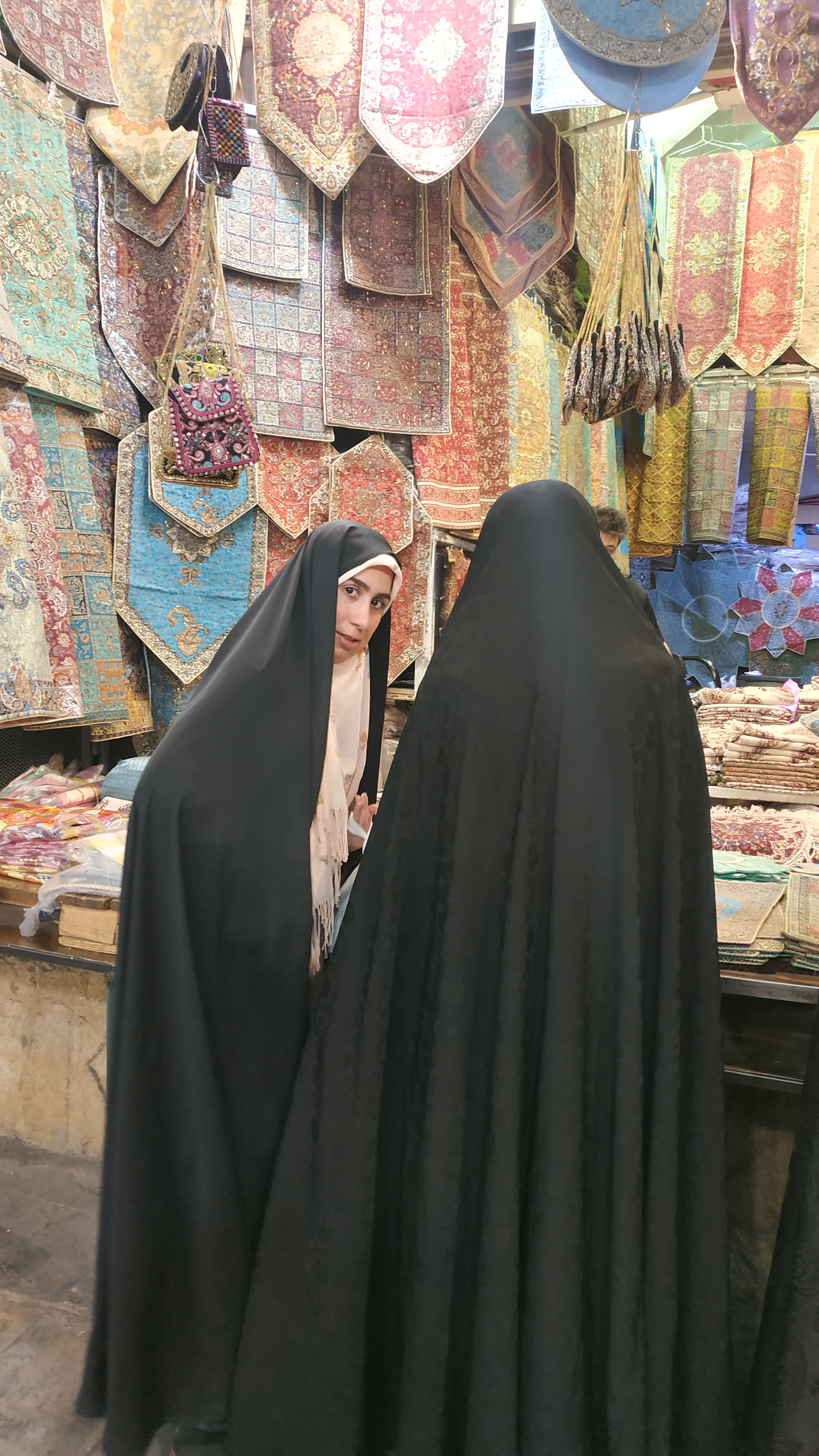
Women wearing chadors in Shiraz, Iran

The enforcement of the dress code in Iran has fluctuated between strict and relaxed over the years, leading to ongoing debate between conservatives and reformists like Hassan Rouhani. The United Nations Human Rights Council has urged Iran to uphold the rights of those advocating for dress code reforms. The government officially promotes stricter veiling, citing both Islamic principles and pre-Islamic Iranian culture.

Ruhollah Khomeini maintained that women do not have to wear a full-body cover. He stated that women can choose any kind of attire they like so long as it covers them properly and they have a hijab. His successor, Ali Khamenei, stated that the hijab does not hinder participation in social, political, or academic activities. In 2024, the former president of Iran Hassan Rouhani criticised the reinstatement of Iran's morality police and the implementation of the "Noor plan" by law enforcement authorities. He expressed shock over the hijab law approved by the Guardian Council which prescribed severe punishment for those violating it, saying that it "aligns neither with the Constitution, nor with justice, nor with the Qur'an and Islamic culture."

The Indonesian province of Aceh encourages Muslim women to wear hijab in public. Indonesia's central government granted Aceh's local government the right to impose Sharia in 2001, although that no local regulations should conflict with Indonesian national laws, in a deal aiming to put an end to the separatist movement in the province.

Saudi Arabia formally required women to cover their hair and wear a full-body garment, though enforcement varies. Saudi women typically wear the abaya, while foreigners may choose long coats. Regulations are enforced by religious police, which once faced criticism for their role in a fire rescue where schoolgirls' lack of hijabs was reportedly a factor, leading to 15 deaths.

During the Taliban regime in Afghanistan, the wearing of the hijab is mandated for women. The requirement extends to covering not only their heads but also their faces, as it was believed that doing so would prevent any perceived impropriety and maintain modesty in society.

=== Legal bans ===
Some feminists argue that attempts either to impose or to ban the veil stem from the same desire to control women's bodies and their socialization. Thus, unveiling has historically been used as a colonial strategy to assert the domination of white men over colonized populations. This imperialist logic continues to be criticized today. According to Itziar Ziga, for example, discourses that claim to emancipate Muslim women from the veil are part of an Islamophobic framework.

==== Muslim world ====
The tradition of veiling hair in Persian culture has ancient pre-Islamic origins, but the widespread custom was ended by Reza Shah's government in 1936, as the hijab was considered to be incompatible with modernization and he ordered "unveiling" act or Kashf-e hijab. In some cases the police arrested women who wore the veil and would forcibly remove it. These policies had popular support but outraged the Shi'a clerics, to whom appearing in public without their cover was tantamount to nakedness. Some women refused to leave the house out of fear of being assaulted by Reza Shah's police. In 1941, the compulsory element in the policy of unveiling was abandoned.

Turkey had a ban on headscarves at universities in the 80s. In 2008, the Turkish government attempted to lift a ban on Muslim headscarves at universities, but were overturned by the country's Constitutional Court. In December 2010, however, the Turkish government ended the headscarf ban in universities and schools. The ban on civil servants remained in effect for a few more years. The current situation regarding the headscarf, -which may be problematic in terms of the principle of judge neutrality due to its religious symbolism also,- is revealed by Recep Tayyip Erdoğan's words at an initial appointment ceremony attended by headscarf-wearing judge and prosecutor candidates: "Regarding our headscarf-wearing judicial members… It may take some time, there may be some difficulty in accepting it, but God willing, everyone will accept the new Turkey where freedoms are applied equally to everyone."

In Tunisia, women were banned from wearing the hijab in state offices in 1981; in the 1980s and 1990s, more restrictions were put in place.

In June 2024, Tajikistan's parliament passed a bill banning "foreign clothing" and religious celebrations for children during the Islamic holidays of Eid al-Fitr and Eid al-Adha. The upper house, Majlisi Milli, approved the legislation on 19 June, following approval by the lower house, Majlisi Namoyandagon, on 8 May. The bill specifically targets the hijab, a traditional Islamic headscarf. This formalization of restrictions comes after years of Tajikistan unofficially discouraging Islamic attire, including headscarves and bushy beards. In 2007, the Ministry of Education banned both Islamic clothing and Western-style miniskirts in schools, a policy later extended to all public institutions. Minister of Culture Shamsiddin Orumbekzoda told Radio Free Europe that Islamic dress was "really dangerous". Under previous laws, women wearing hijabs are already banned from entering the country's government offices.

==== Europe ====
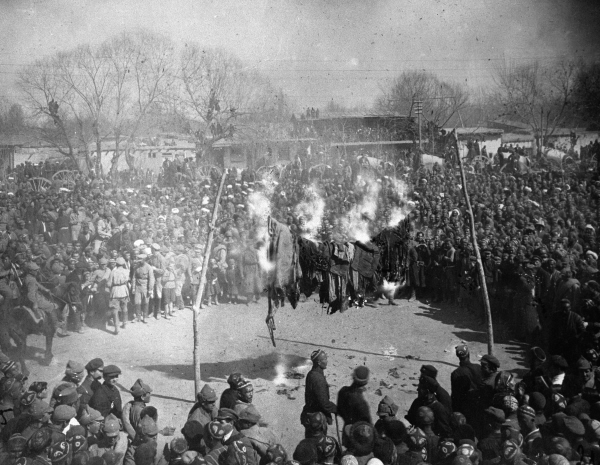
A veil-burning ceremony in USSR as part of Soviet Hujum policies

In the former Soviet Union, a broad atheistic Sovietization campaign known as Hujum was undertaken by the Communist Party of the Soviet Union to remove all manifestations of gender inequality within Soviet Central Asia, targeting prevalent practices among Soviet Muslims, such as female veiling practices.

On 15 March 2004, France passed a law banning "symbols or clothes through which students conspicuously display their religious affiliation" in public primary schools, middle schools, and secondary schools. In the Belgian city of Maaseik, the niqāb has been banned since 2006. On 13 July 2010, France's lower house of parliament overwhelmingly approved a bill that would ban wearing the Islamic full veil in public. It became the first European country to ban the full-face veil in public places, followed by Belgium, Latvia, Bulgaria, Austria, Denmark and some cantons of Switzerland in the following years.

Belgium banned the full-face veil in 2011 in places like parks and on the streets. In September 2013, electors of the Swiss canton of Ticino voted in favour of a ban on face veils in public areas. In 2016, Latvia and Bulgaria banned the burqa in public places. In October 2017, wearing a face veil became also illegal in Austria. This ban also includes scarves, masks and clown paint that cover faces to avoid discriminating against Muslim dress. In 2016, Bosnia-Herzegovina's supervising judicial authority upheld a ban on wearing Islamic headscarves in courts and legal institutions, despite protests from the Muslim community that constitutes 40% of the country. In 2017, the European Court of Justice ruled that companies were allowed to bar employees from wearing visible religious symbols, including the hijab. However, if the company has no policy regarding the wearing of clothes that demonstrate religious and political ideas, a customer cannot ask employees to remove the clothing item. In 2018, the Danish parliament passed a law banning the full-face veil in public places.

In 2016, more than 20 French towns banned the use of the burqini, a style of swimwear intended to accord with rules of hijab. Dozens of women were subsequently issued fines, with some tickets citing not wearing "an outfit respecting good morals and secularism", and some were verbally attacked by bystanders when they were confronted by the police. Enforcement of the ban also hit beachgoers wearing a wide range of modest attire besides the burqini. Media reported that in one case the police forced a woman to remove part of her clothing on a beach in Nice. The Nice mayor's office denied that she was forced to do so and the mayor condemned what he called the "unacceptable provocation" of wearing such clothes in the aftermath of the Nice terrorist attack.

A team of psychologists in Belgium have investigated, in two studies of 166 and 147 participants, whether the Belgians' discomfort with the Islamic hijab, and the support of its ban from the country's public sphere, is motivated by the defence of the values of autonomy and universalism (which includes equality), or by xenophobia/ethnic prejudice and by anti-religious sentiments. The studies have revealed the effects of subtle prejudice/racism, values (self-enhancement values and security versus universalism), and religious attitudes (literal anti-religious thinking versus spirituality), in predicting greater levels of anti-veil attitudes beyond the effects of other related variables such as age and political conservatism.

In 2019, Austria banned the hijab in schools for children up to ten years of age. The ban was motivated by the equality between men and women and improving social integration with respect to local customs. Parents who sent their child to school with a headscarf would be fined 440 euro. The ban was overturned in 2020 by the Austrian Constitutional Court.

In 2019, Staffanstorp Municipality in Sweden banned all veils for school pupils up to sixth grade.

==== Canada ====
In 2019, the Canadian province of Quebec passed a ban on hijab for public servants, notably teachers in elementary and high schools.

==== India ====
In India, Muslim women are allowed to wear the hijab and/or burqa anytime, anywhere. However, in January 2022, a number of colleges in the South Indian state of Karnataka stopped female students wearing the hijab from entering the campus, following which the state government issued a circular banning 'religious clothes' in educational institutions where uniforms are prescribed. On 15 March 2022, the Karnataka High Court, in a verdict, upheld the hijab ban in educational institutions where uniforms are prescribed, arguing that the practice is non-essential in Islam. The hijab ban was condemned inside India and abroad by officials in countries including the United States, Bahrain and Pakistan, as well as by Human Rights Watch, and by figures like Malala Yousafzai.

A study published by human rights body People's Union for Civil Liberties reported that the move to ban hijab has widened the social divide and increased fear among Muslims in Karnataka.

==== China ====
In Xinjiang province, the Chinese government has banned women from wearing veils as part of a major crackdown on what it sees as religious extremism from Muslim Uyghurs.

=== Unofficial pressure to wear hijab ===
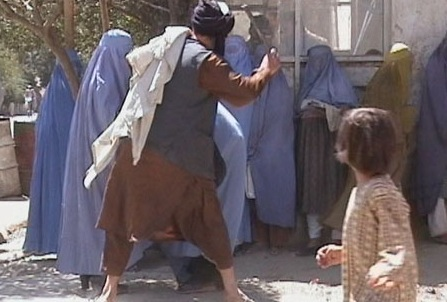
A religious policeman beating a woman for removing her burqa headpiece in public, Kabul, 2001 (image obtained by the Revolutionary Association of the Women of Afghanistan)

In Srinagar, the capital of the Indian state of Jammu and Kashmir, a previously unknown militant group calling itself Lashkar-e-Jabbar claimed responsibility for a series of acid attacks on women who did not wear the burqa in 2001, threatening to punish women who do not adhere to their vision of Islamic dress. Women of Kashmir, most of whom are not fully veiled, defied the warning, and the attacks were condemned by prominent militant and separatist groups of the region.

Some women in Jordan have reported unofficial pressure to wear a hijab in 2018.

=== Unofficial pressure against wearing the hijab ===
In recent years, women wearing the hijab have been subjected to verbal and physical attacks worldwide, particularly following terrorist attacks. Louis A. Cainkar writes that the data suggest that women in hijab rather than men are the predominant target of anti-Muslim attacks, not because they are more easily identifiable as Muslims, but because they are seen to represent a threat to the local moral order that the attackers are seeking to defend. Some women stop wearing the hijab out of fear or following perceived pressure from their acquaintances, but many refuse to stop wearing it out of religious conviction, even when they are urged to do so for self-protection.

Kazakhstan has no official ban on wearing the hijab, but those who wear it have reported that authorities use a number of tactics to discriminate against them.

In 2015, authorities in Uzbekistan organized a "deveiling" campaign in the capital city Tashkent, during which women wearing the hijab were detained and taken to a police station. Those who agreed to remove their hijab were released "after a conversation", while those who refused were transferred to the counterterrorism department and given a lecture. Their husbands or fathers were then summoned to convince the women to obey the police. This followed an earlier campaign in the Fergana Valley.

After the election of Shavkat Mirziyoyev as President of Uzbekistan in December 2016, Muslims were given the opportunity to openly express their religious identity, which manifested itself in the wider spread of hijabs in Uzbekistan. In July 2021, the state allowed the wearing of the hijab in public places.

In Kyrgyzstan in 2016, the government sponsored street banners aiming to dissuade women from wearing the hijab.

In September 2026, a video circulated online alleging that the hijab had been banned in Azerbaijani schools. The video shows girls wearing the hijab being prevented from entering middle school.

=== Workplace discrimination against hijab-wearing women ===
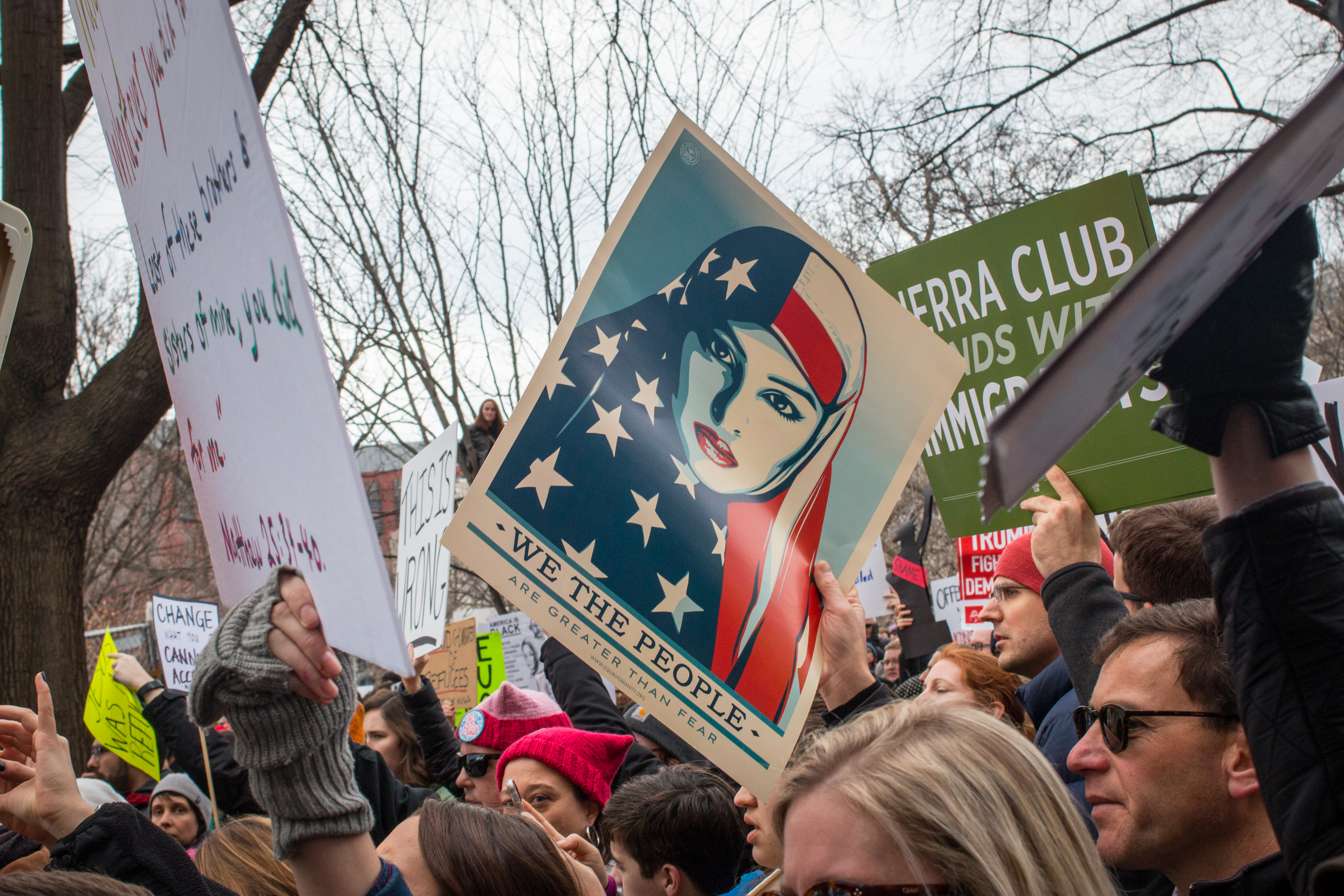
Protesters in Washington, D.C. hold a sign depicting a woman wrapped in a U.S. flag hijab following Trump's signing of Executive Order 13769 in 2017

Discrimination against Muslims often affects women more due to the hijab making them more visible, leading to workplace prejudice, particularly after the rise of Islamophobia post-9/11. Hijab-wearing Muslim women face both overt and covert discrimination in job applications and workplace environments, with covert bias often resulting in more hostile treatment. Perceived discrimination can harm well-being, but may also be overcome by religious pride and community; studies show hijab-wearing women often find greater strength and belonging despite challenges.

The issue of discrimination against Muslims affects Muslim women more due to the hijab making them more identifiable compared to Muslim men. Particularly after the September 11 attacks and the coining of the term Islamophobia, some of Islamophobia's manifestations are seen within the workplace. Women wearing the hijab are at risk of discrimination in their workplace because the hijab helps identify them for anyone who may hold Islamophobic attitudes. Their association with the Islamic faith automatically projects any negative stereotyping of the religion onto them. As a result of the heightened discrimination, some hijab-wearing Muslim women in the workplace resort to taking off their hijab in hopes to prevent any further prejudice acts.

A number of hijab-wearing women who were interviewed expressed that perceived discrimination also poses a problem for them. To be specific, Muslim women shared that they chose not to wear the headscarf out of fear of future discrimination.

The discrimination hijab-wearing Muslim women face goes beyond affecting their work experience; it also interferes with their decision to uphold religious obligations. As a result, hijab-wearing Muslim women in the United States have worries regarding their ability to follow their religion, because it might mean they are rejected employment.

A study by Ali et al. (2015) found a relationship between the discrimination Muslims face at work and their job satisfaction. In other words, the discrimination hijab-wearing Muslim women face at work is associated with their overall feeling of contentment of their jobs, especially compared to other religious groups.

Hijab-wearing Muslim women not only experience discrimination whilst in their job environment; they also experience discrimination in their attempts to get a job. An experimental study conducted on potential hiring discrimination among Muslims found that in terms of overt discrimination there were no differences between Muslim women who wore traditional Islamic clothing and those who did not. However, covert discrimination was noted towards Muslim who wore the hijab, and as a result were dealt with in a hostile and rude manner. While observing hiring practices among 4,000 employers in the U.S., experimenters found that employers who self-identified as Republican tended to avoid making interviews with candidates who appeared Muslim on their social network pages.

One instance that some view as hijab discrimination in the workplace that gained public attention and made it to the Supreme Court was EEOC v. Abercrombie & Fitch. The U.S. Equal Employment Opportunity Commission took advantage of its power granted by Title VII and made a case for a young hijabi female who applied for a job, but was rejected due to her wearing a headscarf which violated Abercrombie & Fitch's pre-existing and longstanding policy against head coverings and all black garments.

Discrimination levels differ depending on geographical location; for example, South Asian Muslims in the United Arab Emirates do not perceive as much discrimination as their South Asian counterparts in the U.S. Although, South Asian Muslim women in both locations are similar in describing discrimination experiences as subtle and indirect interactions. The same study also reports differences among South Asian Muslim women who wear the hijab, and those who do not. For non-hijabis, they reported to have experienced more perceived discrimination when they were around other Muslims.

Perceived discrimination is detrimental to well-being, both mentally and physically. However, perceived discrimination may also be related to more positive well-being for the individual. A study in New Zealand concluded that while Muslim women who wore the headscarf did in fact experience discrimination, these negative experiences were overcome by much higher feelings of religious pride, belonging, and centrality.

== World Hijab Day ==
The World Hijab Day (WHD), which is an annual event founded by Bangladeshi American Nazma Khan in 2013, takes place on 1 February each year in 140 countries worldwide.

== See also ==
Overview

- Islamic veiling practices by country

Hijab

- Headscarf controversy in Turkey
- Hijab emoji
- Iranian protests against compulsory hijab
- Islamic scarf controversy in France
- Muslim feminist views on hijab
- Types of hijab
- World Hijab Day

Related

- List of religious headgear
- Proposed burqa ban in Australia
- Purdah, practice of female spatial concealment in South Asia and associated garment
- Tagelmust/litham, male Tuareg mouth-veil; not religious
- Violence against women#Dress

Islamic covering variants

- Paranja, Central Asian burqa
- Tudong, Islamic head-cover in Muslim Southeast Asia
- Yashmak, Ottoman face-veil, in use in Turkey, Egypt and among Turkmen

Non-Muslim religious coverings

- Christian headcovering
- Cowl, medieval European hooded cloak, still used by monks
- Ghoonghat of the Hindu
- Head covering for Jewish women
- Religious habit
