= September 1982 Rentería attack =

Ambush by the Basque separatist organisation ETA

1982 Errenteria ambush
- Part of the Basque conflict
Date	14 September 1982
Location	Errenteria, Basque Autonomous Community, Spain
Result	4 policemen killed, 1 seriously wounded

Belligerents
(Basque Country (autonomous community)) ETA	Spain: Civil Guard

Strength
6	5

Casualties and losses
0	

The September 1982 Errenteria attack was an ambush by the Basque separatist organisation ETA which occurred on 14 September 1982 on the motorway near the Basque town of Errenteria (Spanish: Rentería) in Gipuzkoa. The targets were several Spanish national police officers, four of whom were killed in the attack, with the fifth seriously injured. The attack was ETA's deadliest of 1982.

== Background ==
ETA had already killed six people in the area around Errenteria between September 1979 and March 1982. The triangle between Donostia/San Sebastián, Errenteria and Andoain had also been one of the focal points of far-right Spanish state-sponsored terrorism and ten people with suspected connections to ETA had been assassinated there between 1979 and 1981. The attack came one day before the end of the security forces Summer 1982 initiative, which was aimed at reducing ETA activity and had resulted in a 7 per cent drop in the number of ETA killings compared to 1981. The attacks also occurred one month before the Spanish general election, causing consternation among politicians.

== The attack ==
At 11:30 in the morning, five police officers drove to the Susperregui bar in the village of Frantxilla to have lunch. Three of them arrived in uniform in an official car with distinctive official markings, while the other two were wearing civilian clothes and travelling in a car without any official police identification. According to the shop owner, this was the first time in about a month that the police had visited his bar. However, for around a month, five of the six members of the Donosti unit of ETA which would launch the attack, had lain in wait. They had climbed the nearby hills, the Alto de Perurena, in order to spot a suitable target. On 14 September 1982, the ETA members spotted the two vehicles leaving the bar and driving down the road linking San Sebastián and Errenteria in the direction of Errenteria. In the vicinity of the Landarbaso caves in Aizpitarte, about three hundred metres from Listorreta park, the police vehicles were forced to slow down at a very steep curve, greatly reducing their speed. On that corner, near a small ravine, and about half a mile from where they had lunch, the two cars were subjected to crossfire from automatic weapons. The police tried to repel the attack by opening fire with their pistols, but without managing to hit any of their attackers, who were protected by the terrain. Two of the officers, Jesús Ordóñez Pérez and Juan Seronero Sacristán, were killed instantly. The other three, Alfonso López Fernández, Antonio Cedillo Toscano and Juan José Torrente Terrón, were all seriously wounded. Both police vehicles were hit by a total of nearly 100 bullets.

One of the plainclothes officers, Antonio Cedillo, despite being seriously wounded, was still able to fire at the fleeing ETA members. He then made his way on foot down the road towards Errentería, collapsing 100 metres from the attack in a large pool of blood. A civilian, Jose Elicegui, who lived in a village a few metres from the road junction linking the towns of Oiartzun, Astigarraga and Errenteria, was on his way to work when he spotted the police officer and stopped to pick him up to take him to hospital. However, Elicegui was pursued by three ETA members who forced him to stop. After searching his van and finding the wounded police officer, they finished Cedillo off with a shot to the back of the neck.

The other three ETA members fled on foot from the scene and hijacked a car to escape. Alfonso Lopez Fernandez, one of the two remaining policemen, died while being transported to the Red Cross hospital in San Sebastián. The remaining officer, Juan José Torrente Terrón, was operated upon arrival to the hospital and, after more than three hours in surgery, was admitted to the Intensive Care Unit in a coma. Torrente took over nine months to recover from his wounds. The Civil Guard conducted an intensive search of the area and collected a lot of shell casings from 9mm Parabellum, a type of ammunition commonly used by ETA. The bodies of the policemen killed remained at the scene until the arrival of forensics. ETA claimed responsibility for the attack the same evening in a statement released through the Egin newspaper. In the same statement, they took responsibility for other attacks committed the previous week against a farm owned by the army in San Sebastián and against the Civil Guard barracks in Durango.

== Funerals ==
The funerals for those killed took place at 7:00 pm the same day in the Civil Government of Gipuzkoa. The Prime Minister Leopoldo Calvo-Sotelo, the Interior Minister Juan José Rosón, and the Inspector General of Police, Felix Alcala Galiano, travelled to San Sebastian to attend the funerals. Also present were the lehendakari, Carlos Garaikoetxea, the government delegate in the Basque Autonomous Community, Jaime Mayor Oreja, civil and military governors, the mayor of San Sebastián, Jesus Maria Alcain and Deputy General Javier Aizarna. The main political parties in the area, the Spanish Socialist Workers' Party (PSOE), the Basque Nationalist Party (PNV), the Union of the Democratic Centre (UCD) and People's Alliance sent representatives to meet and console the families and victims of the dead.

== Reactions ==
The Archbishop of San Sebastián issued a communique calling for an end to the killings in the Basque Country. The majority of Basque daily newspapers criticised the attack, with Deia arguing against a vote for Batasuna, the political wing of ETA and Tribuna Vasca criticising in particular the killing of Cedillo, arguing that even in wars, the wounded were not executed. The PNV accused ETA of trying to create pre-election chaos. The PSOE stated that if they won the elections scheduled for the following month, they would use all democratic means in their power to put a definitive end to ETA activity. PSOE executive member Javier Solana added that his party would not negotiate with ETA. The People's Alliance and Euskadiko Ezkerra also strongly condemned the killings. Meanwhile, the UCD in Guipúzcoa released a statement sympathising with the State Security Forces. Julián Carmona Fernández, a police officer who had been charged with accompanying one of the bodies, committed suicide by shooting himself in the head the day after the attacks. This led to speculation that his actions were a result of trauma he had suffered because of the attacks, as some of the dead were his personal friends. Police inspector general Felix Alcala Galiano, however, stated that he did not believe this to be the reason for his suicide.

== Police investigations ==
Police sources identified Manuel Urionabarrenetxea, alias Manu, as one of the principal organisers of the attack. Manu had been born in Gernika in 1952 and, according to security forces, had also been responsible for the killing of a Civil Guard in Lekeitio in 1978 and three killings in Oiartzun and Errenteria in 1981 and 1982, as well as attacks after 1982. He had been arrested by police in 1979, accused of supplying information to ETA, but was subsequently released. On 21 August 1989, police identified a man in the centre of Vitoria-Gasteiz as Manu and followed him and a 28-year-old ETA suspect, Teodoro Julián Mariscal, to a bar in the centre of the town. However, when they tried to arrest them, according to police sources, the man identified as Manu produced a gun and a firefight ensued. The suspect believed to be Manu escaped by hijacking a car, while Teodoro Julián Mariscal and a civil guard were wounded. Almost one month later, on 17 September 1989, Manu was one of two ETA militants killed by members of the Civil Guard in Irun. According to the official account, the death occurred during a shootout as the militants tried to flee in a vehicle into the French Basque Country, with Manu's companion dying by his own grenade he had been allegedly attempted to throw at police. However, the circumstances of the killings were disputed, with Basque nationalists and local groups alleging that the militants had been extrajudicially executed by the Civil Guard..

On 15 June 1984, Jesus Maria Zabarte Arregi surrendered to police after a confrontation which saw his two companions killed. Zabarte admitted to participating in a number of ETA killings, among them the Errenteria attack. Zabarte denounced that the confession was extracted under torture during incomunicado detention, but this was never investigated. In 1985, Zabarte was sentenced to 300 years in prison for his part in various attacks, including the Errenteria attack.
