= Assembly of the Forty =

Worship ceremony in Alevism and Bektashism

Kırklar cem'i, Kırklar Meclisi The Assembly of the Forty, or Council of the Forty, is a communal worship ceremony in Alevism and Bektashism that is said to have been attended by Muhammad upon his return from the Mi'raj. Unlike the classic Sunni Miraj stories, the story tells of Muhammad being removed from his role as a person who brought God's commands, and how he was able to enter the realm of meeting with God by giving his ring, which contained the seal of prophethood, to a lion. In the stories, alongside the understanding developed by Islamic theology that God cannot be likened to or enter into any created being, there are short references challenging traditional Sunni positions such as prayer, alcohol prohibition, separation of men and women, and veiling practises in Islam.

In addition to commemorating this event, Alevis gather in places called cemevis to pray, recite poetry, and perform ritual dances called semah. Semah is an important ritual dance and one of the twelve obligations of the event. This dance is performed by men and women together and simultaneously, and is led by a Dede. If there is no suitable Dede to lead the Cem, any other member of the community who knows the relevant rituals can lead this service. The Cem of the Forty is held at regular intervals, usually weekly.

== Sources and debates ==
Alevis legends are stories based on oral transmissions, which have developed, changed, and matured over centuries. These stories take on new forms according to different emphases and are passed down from generation to generation in religious ceremonies. Attempts to record these stories, as in the Buyruk example, may include or highlight a particular version of these stories.

One axis of the debates is the tension between the emphasis on the “oral” nature of Alevism and the authority of the written Buyruk collections. Another axis is the problem of authorship and attribution: although the texts are attributed to Imam Ja'far in the tradition, philological comparisons reveal the contributions of different authors and compilers. In this respect, Buyruk is considered both a normative authority text and a compilation rearranged according to local needs.
