= Pauline Hanson burqa incidents =

2017 and 2025 incidents in Australia

- Part of the campaign for a burqa ban in Australia and far-right politics in Australia
- Date: 17 August 2017 and 24 November 2025
- Venue: Australian Senate, Canberra
- Type: Political stunt, protest
- Motive: Parliamentary refusal of her bills to introduce a ban on full-face coverings in Australia
- Participants: Senator Pauline Hanson
- Outcome: Asked to leave Senate chamber; Hanson censured by the Senate

On separate occasions in 2017 and 2025, Pauline Hanson, a senator for Queensland and leader of One Nation, wore a burqa into the chamber of the Australian Senate as a form of protest over that chamber's refusal to consider a ban on full-face coverings throughout Australia. Hanson, a prominent right-wing political figure in Australia, has long supported a ban on full-face coverings, including the Islamic burqa and niqab, citing threats to Australian national security. In both incidents, she was widely condemned by the senate, and in 2025 was censured. Despite widespread condemnation, former Nationals leader and deputy prime minister Barnaby Joyce expressed his support, as did senator Ralph Babet.

== Incidents ==
=== 2017 ===
On 17 August 2017, Hanson wore a burqa into the senate for the first time, protesting the lack of a full-face covering ban in Australia. Her actions were met with an impassioned speech by then-leader of the government in the senate, George Brandis. After this protest, a poll conducted found that 57% of Australians supported banning the burqa in public spaces, with 44% claiming strong support. In the previous parliamentary term, she was also joined by Tasmanian senator Jacqui Lambie in calls for a burqa ban.

=== 2025 ===
In the lead up to the 2025 incident, One Nation was experiencing a polling surge, hitting 20% in a RedBridge poll.

On 24 November 2025, in a repeat of her 2017 actions, Hanson wore a burqa into the senate following the chamber's refusal to grant her leave to introduce a bill on the ban of full-face coverings. Prior to entering the chamber, she posted a Facebook post of her wearing it in her office, with the following statement:

Today, the Senate stopped the introduction of my Bill to Ban the Burqa and Other Full-Face Coverings in Public Places.

Despite the ban in 24 countries across the world (including Islamic countries), the hypocrites in our parliament have rejected my Bill. So if the parliament won't ban it, I will display this oppressive, radical, non-religious head garb that risk our national security and the ill treatment of women on the floor of our parliament so that every Australian knows what's at stake.

If they don't want me wearing it - ban the burqa.

— Pauline Hanson, 2025

After walking into the chamber, she was heckled across the chamber, including by Fatima Payman, a Muslim senator from Western Australia, asking "Did she just come from Afghanistan!" Upon Hanson taking her seat, a number of senators sought the call to request the intervention of the president. Eventually, the president requested she leave the chamber, which Hanson refused to do. After further debate, Hanson left the chamber alongside other One Nation senators as well as United Australia Party senator Ralph Babet.

On 25 November, she was censured by the senate.

== Reactions ==
=== 2017 ===
During the 2017 incident, then Leader of the Government in the Senate, George Brandis of the Liberal Party launched an impassioned speech against Hanson stating:

Thank you. Senator Hanson, no, we will not be banning the burka.

Senator Hanson, I am not going to pretend to ignore the stunt that you have tried to pull today by arriving in the Chamber dressed in a burka when we all know that you are not an adherent of the Islamic faith. I would caution and counsel you with respect to be very, very careful of the offence you may do to the religious sensibilities of other Australians.

We have about 500,000 Australians in this country of the Islamic faith. And the vast majority of them are law-abiding, good Australians. Senator Hanson, it is absolutely consistent with being a good, law-abiding Australian and being a strict, adherent Muslim.

Senator Hanson, for the last four years, I have had responsibility pre-eminently among the ministers subject to the Prime Minister for national security policy. And I can tell you, Senator Hanson, that it has been the advice of each director-general of security with whom I have worked and each commissioner of the Australian Federal Police with whom I have worked that it is vital for their intelligence and law-enforcement work that they work cooperatively with the Muslim community. And to ridicule that community, to drive it into a corner, to mock its religious garments is an appalling thing to do and I would ask you to reflect on what you have done.

— George Brandis, 2017

=== 2025 ===
==== Liberal–National Coalition ====
- Senator Anne Ruston of the Liberal Party condemned Hanson's acts, saying “this is not the way you should be addressing this chamber”.
- Representative Barnaby Joyce of the National Party, who since became an independent and has been the subject of speculation regarding his possible transition to Hanson's One Nation supported the act. He later dined with Hanson, saying he would determine whether to switch to her party by the end of the week (28 November).

==== Australian Labor Party ====
- Senator and Leader of the Government Penny Wong condemned Hanson, borrowing words from the similar condemnation made by Brandis in 2017. She then introduced the motion that successfully censured Hanson.

==== Australian Greens ====
- Senator and Leader of the Greens Larissa Waters condemned the stunt as a "middle finger to people of faith."
- Senator and Deputy Leader of the Greens Mehreen Faruqi stated “Finally, after three decades … of piling on hate and racism, on Muslims, on Asians, on people of colour, finally, at least some of us in this chamber want to hold Senator Hanson to account,” also saying that the parliament "drips in racism."

==== Australia's Voice ====
- Senator and Leader of Australia's Voice Fatima Payman criticised Hanson's actions, describing them as "abhorrent and disrespectful to the chamber and the public".

==== Australian Government ====
- Special Envoy to Combat Islamophobia Aftab Malik stated “[These Muslim women] already face harassment, threats of rape, and violence, not because what they have done, but because of what they wear.”

== Similar action internationally ==
Germany – Alternative für Deutschland (AfD) politician Wiebke Muhsal wore a niqab to the Thuringian Landtag (state parliament) in a protest calling for a ban on the face covering in 2016.
