= Errenteria =

Errenteria Orereta/Errenteria Rentería
- Municipality
- Errenteria
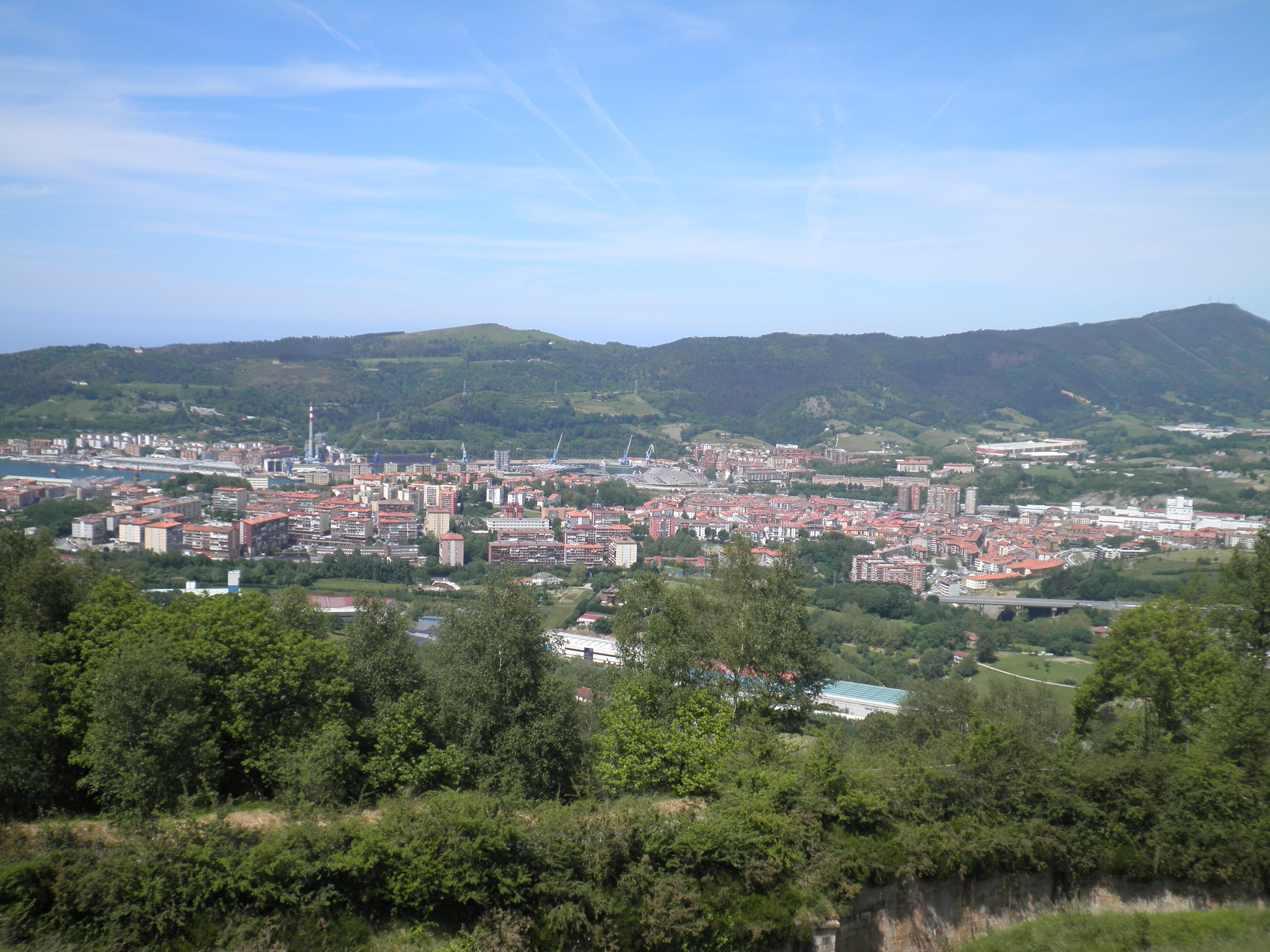
- Panoramic view of Errenteria, from Mount San Marko

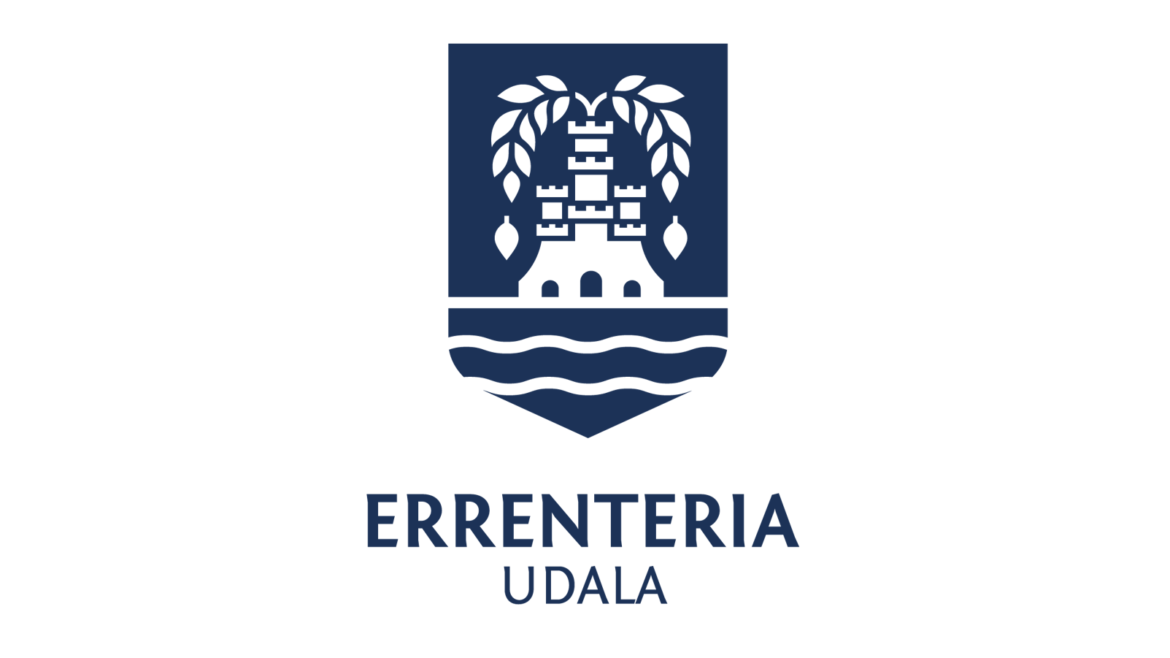
- Coat of arms

- Location in Spain Errenteria (Spain)
- Coordinates: 43°18′45.06″N 1°53′55.55″W
- Country: Spain
- Autonomous community: Basque Country
- Province: Gipuzkoa
- Eskualdea: Oarsoaldea

Government
  - Mayor: Aizpea Otaegi (EH Bildu)

Area
  - Total: 32.26 km^{2} (12.46 sq mi)

Population (2025-01-01)
  - Total: 39,363
  - Density: 1,220/km^{2} (3,160/sq mi)
- Demonym: Errenteriar
- Time zone: UTC+1 (CET)
  - Summer (DST): UTC+2 (CEST)
- Postal code: 20100
- Official language(s): Basque, Spanish
- Website: Official website

Errenteria (Basque: Errenteria, Spanish: Rentería) is a town located in the province of Gipuzkoa in the Basque Autonomous Community, in the north of Spain, near the French border. The river Oiartzun cuts its way through the town, one that has undergone severe pollution up to recent times on its lower stage.

== History ==
The town was founded in 1320, during the reign of Alfonso XI of Castile, with the name of Villanueva de Oiarso or Oyarço. It soon started to be known as La Rentería because it hosted the office where iron export taxes were collected (taxes were called rentas reales i.e. royal rents in medieval Castile).

The Basque form Errenteria (also Errenteri or Errenderi) started to appear towards the end of the 16th century. In 1998, the town hall decided to use Errenteria as the only official name.

In September 1982, Rentería was the scene of the bloodiest ETA attack of that year.

== Districts ==
- Agustinak/Agustinas
- Alaberga
- Beraun
- Kaputxinoak/Capuchinos
- Etxe Berriak/Casas Nuevas
- Gaztaño
- Erdialdea/Centro
- Fanderia
- Gabierrota
- Galtzaraborda
- Iztieta
- Lartzabal
- Listorreta
- Olibet–Ugarritze
- Ondartxo
- Perurena
- Pontika
- Zamalbide
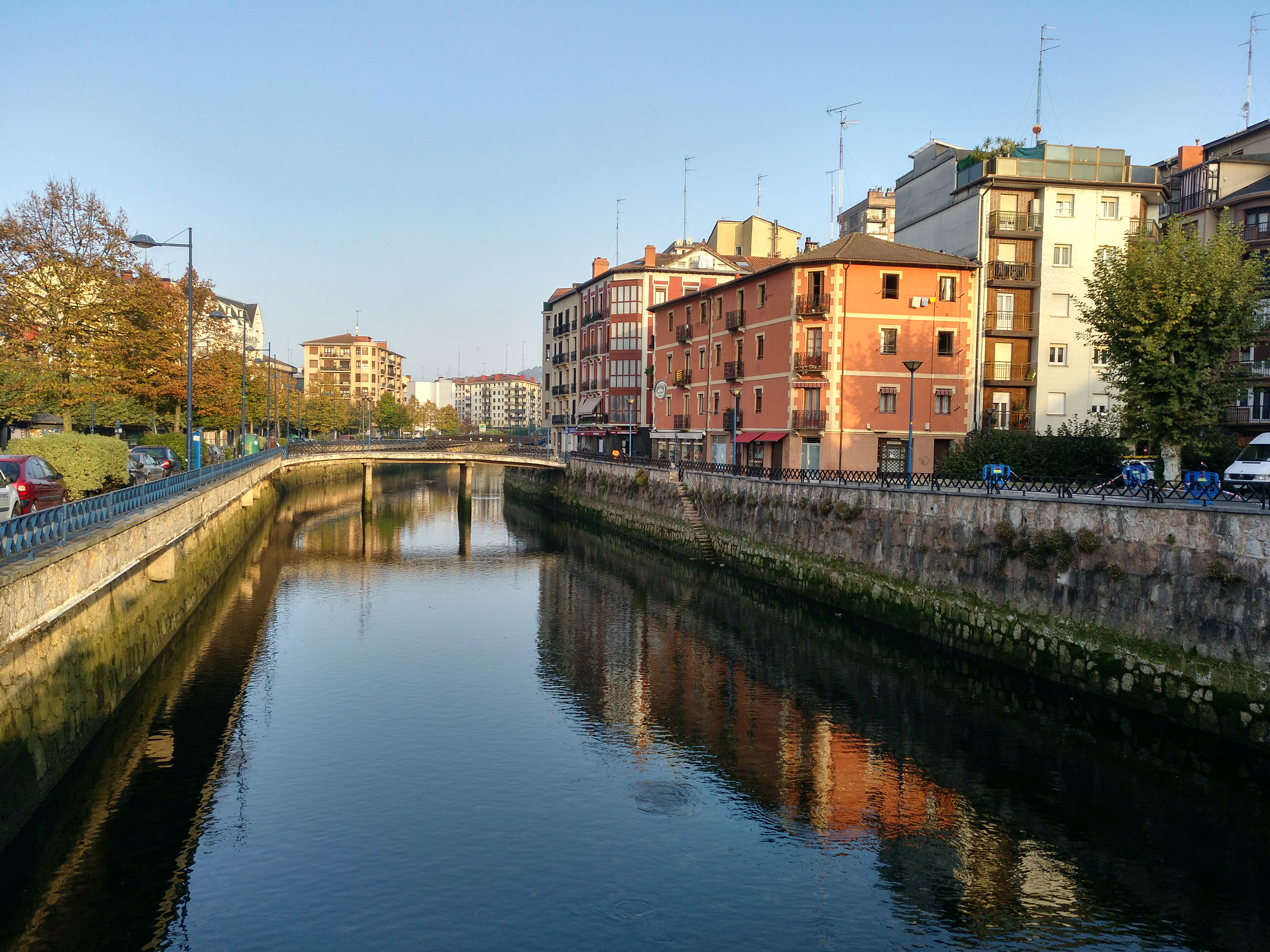
Oiartzun river passing through the Ugarritze district

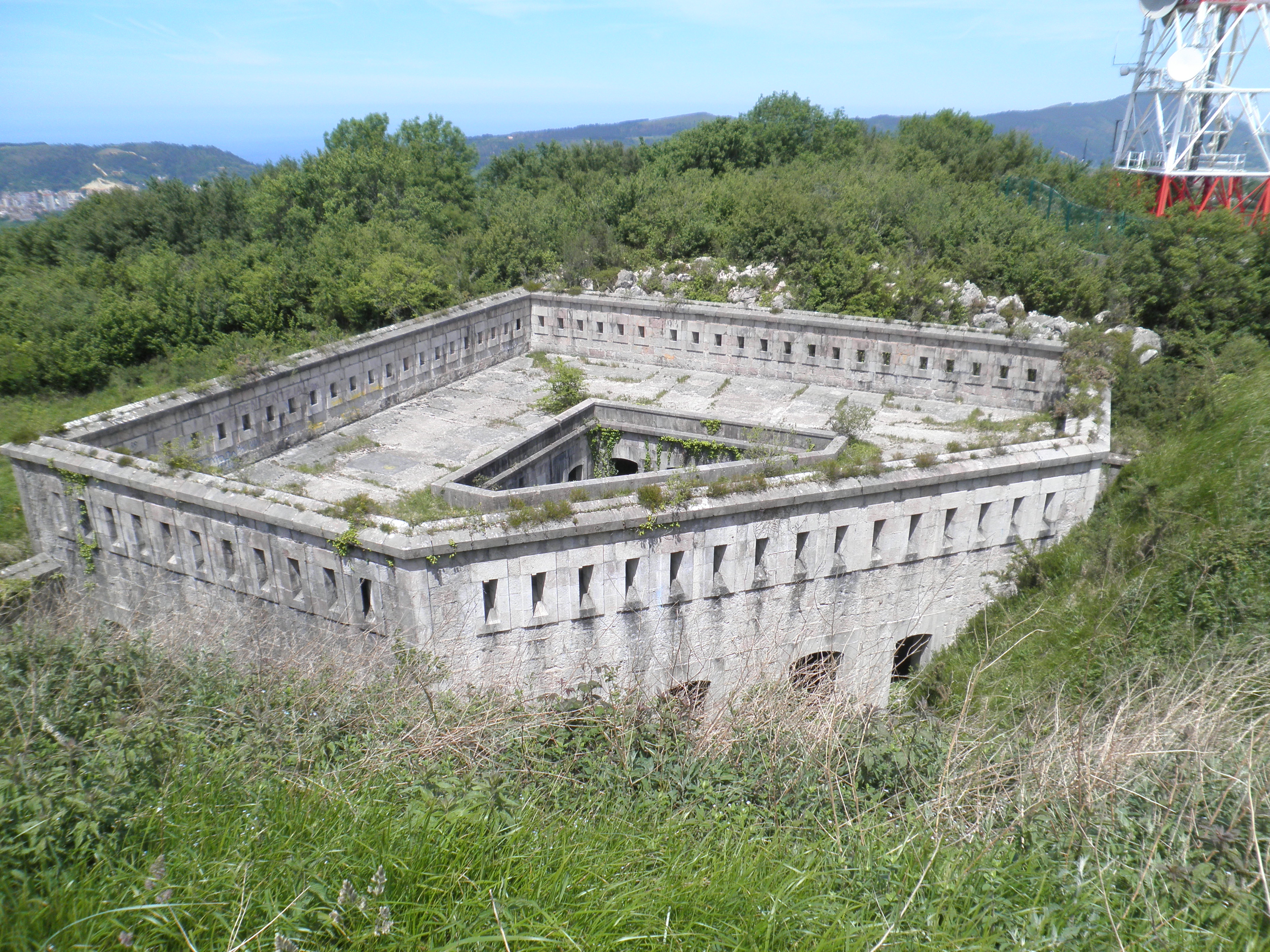
Fortress of Txoritokieta

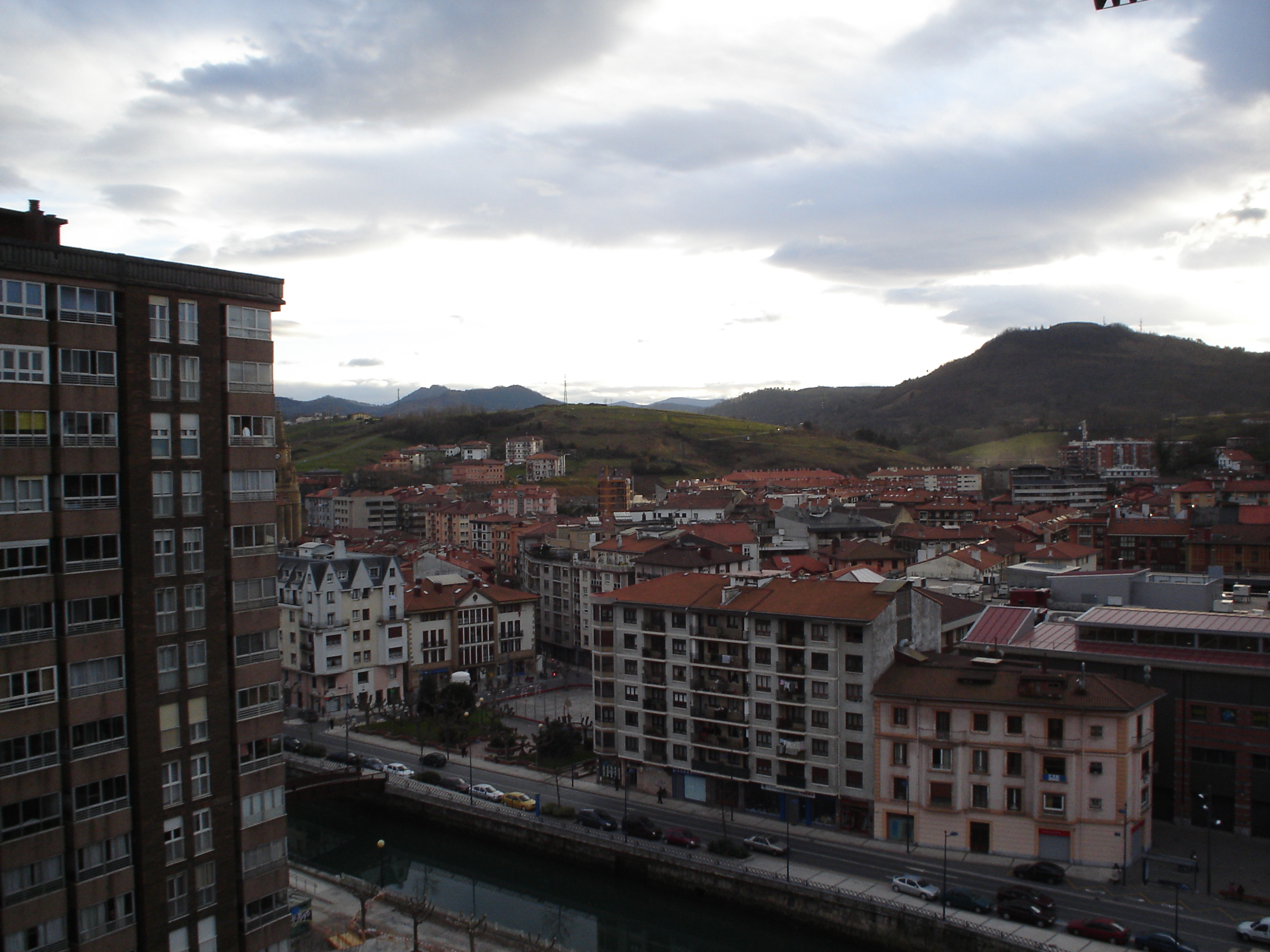
View of downtown Orereta

== Twin towns ==
Errenteria is twinned with:

- Lousada, Portugal
- Tulle, France
- Schorndorf, Germany

== Notable people ==
- Leire Martínez (born 1979), singer and songwriter
- Koldo Mitxelena (1915-1987), linguist
- Itziar Ziga (born 1974), activist and journalist
