= Itziar Ziga =

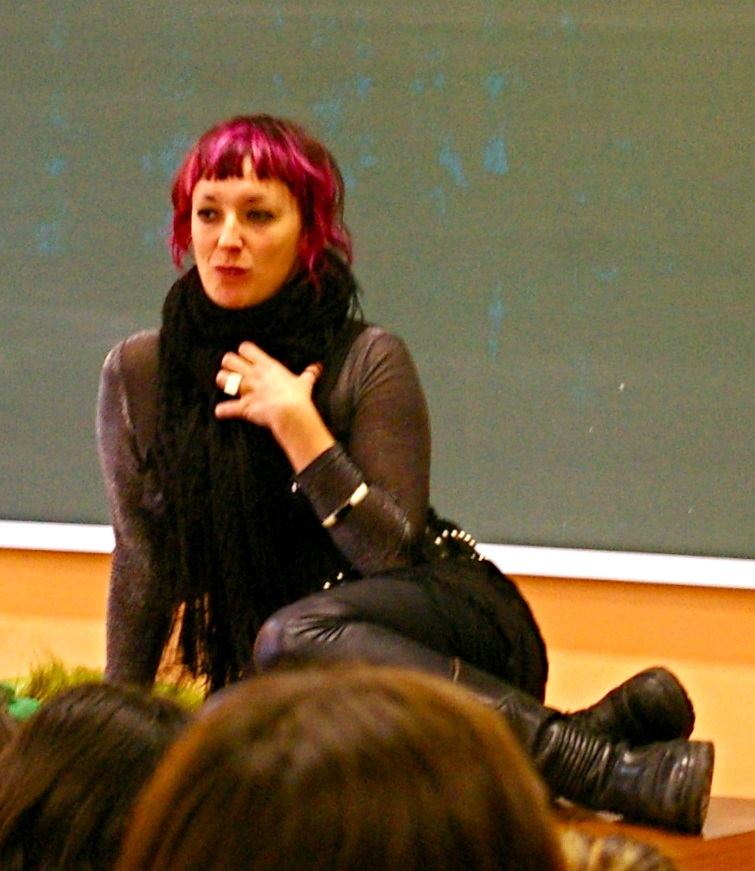
- Born: 1974
- Occupation: Writer, journalist

Itziar Ziga (born 1974 in Errenteria, in the Spanish Basque Country) is a Spanish activist, feminist and journalist.

== Biography ==
Itziar Ziga grew up in Errenteria. She holds a degree in Communication studies.

After obtaining a degree in journalism, she moved to Barcelona, where she worked a succession of highly precarious jobs. For three years, she also worked as a journalist for the feminist periodical Andra. She wrote for the gender theory magazine Parole de Queer and participated actively in various transfeminist movements. She contributed to the blog Hasta la limusina siempre and collaborated with the post-porn production group PostOp.

Itziar Ziga is involved in various political associations, such as the Gay Liberation Front of Catalonia, and the feminist group, now defunct, ex_dones.

In 2009, she published Devenir Perra with Melusina. The book was translated into French in 2020 under the title Devenir chienne. It was published by Cambourakis Editions with a preface by Virginie Despentes and Paul B. Preciado.

She is regularly cited alongside Paul B. Preciado as a transfeminist.

== Publications ==
=== In Spanish ===
- Dels drets a les llibertats: una història política de l'alliberament GLT a Catalunya (FAGC 1986-2006) (in Catalan). Virus Editorial. 2008. ISBN 978-84-96044-96-8.
- Ziga, Itziar (2020-06-24). Devenir perra (in Spanish). Melusina. ISBN 978-84-15373-94-0.
- Ziga, Itziar. (2009). Un zulo propio. Editorial Melusina. ISBN 978-84-96614-70-3. OCLC 625427450.
- Glamur i resistència, Le Tangram, Barcelona, 2011.
- El género desordenado, Egalés, Barcelona–Madrid, 2010.
- Ziga, Itziar (2011). Sexual Herria (in Spanish). Txalaparta. ISBN 978-84-15313-08-3.
- Ziga, Itziar (2014). Malditas: una estirpe transfeminista (in Spanish). Txalaparta. ISBN 978-84-15313-93-9.
- Ziga, Itziar (2020). La feliz y violenta vida de Maribel Ziga (in Spanish). Melusina..

=== In French ===
- Itziar Ziga (2020). Devenir chienne (in French). Paris: Cambourakis. p. 176. ISBN 978-2-36624-486-1.
- Itziar Ziga (2025). L'Heureuse et Violente Vie de Maribel Ziga (in French). Paris: Cambourakis. p. 128. ISBN 978-2-36624-983-5.
