= Proposed burqa ban in Australia =

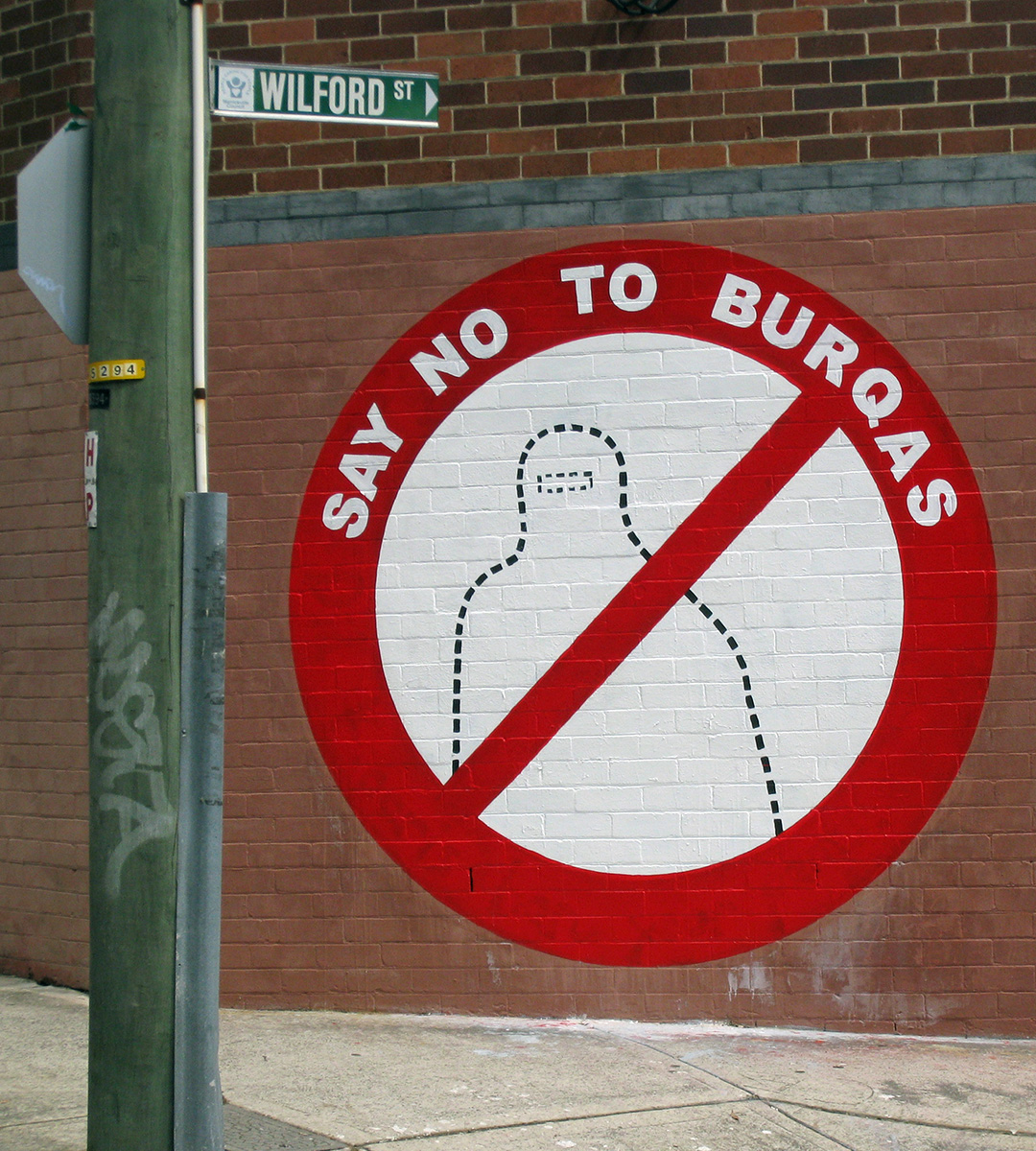
"Say no to burqas" mural in Newtown, New South Wales.

In Australia, there is an ongoing debate over the possibility of a ban on the wearing of burqa and niqab, conservative forms of dress for Muslim women. There are currently 14 nations that have banned the burqa and niqab, including Austria, France, Belgium, Denmark, Switzerland, Netherlands, Portugal, Latvia, Bulgaria, Cameroon, Chad, Congo, and Gabon.

Senator Pauline Hanson has worn a burqa into parliament multiple times as a form of protest.

== Background ==
Following the Moscow theatre hostage crisis in 2002, Australian politician Fred Nile asked whether the then state minister of police would consider banning full-body coverings like those worn by the Chechen terrorists from parliament and public gathering places in order to prevent the carriage of weapons or explosive devices. On 23 June 2010, Nile introduced a bill into the Legislative Council to criminalize the public wearing of any face covering which prevents the identification of the wearer, including the burqa and niqab. In 2014 Nile introduced another bill that would ban the burqa and niqab.

In 2010, Senator Cory Bernardi wrote an opinion piece calling for a ban on wearing the burqa in public.

In September 2014, Senator Jacqui Lambie announced plans to introduce a private member's bill aimed at banning the burqa in Australia. In February 2017, she introduced a private member's bill which would amend the Criminal Code Act 1995 to make it illegal to wear full-face coverings in public places when a terrorism threat declaration is in force, unless it was necessary for certain purposes.

== Arguments ==
One main argument for a burqa ban is security, especially in government areas such as Parliament House. It has been suggested that rather than a complete ban, people wearing face coverings be required to show their face for 'security and identification purposes' in these places exclusively.

Some who support a ban have argued that Islamic women who wear burqas are forced to do so by men rather than by Islam, and that Islam does not require women to cover their faces. Some Islamic women say they feel 'naked' walking out without wearing a burqa, and that a ban would effectively force them to stay at home.

The proposed ban has been criticised for conflicting with Section 116 of the Constitution, which prohibits the federal government from making any law 'prohibiting the free exercise of religion'.

== State-level enforcement ==
In September 2011, Australia's most populous state, New South Wales, passed the Identification Legislation Amendment Act 2011 requiring a person to remove a face covering if asked by a state official. The law is viewed as a response to a court case in 2011 where a woman in Sydney was convicted of falsely claiming that a traffic policeman had tried to remove her niqab.

== Political positions ==
Politicians such as Cory Bernardi, George Christensen, Jacqui Lambie, Mark Latham, Pauline Hanson and Tony Abbott have openly advocated for a ban on the burqa, either in public places or in all settings (depending on the person). Several political parties also officially support a ban on the burqa, including the Australian Conservatives and One Nation.

== Public opinion ==
A 2017 poll of 2,832 Australian residents conducted by media outlet Sky News Australia and ReachTEL found that more than half of respondents either supported or strongly supported banning the burqa in public spaces.

Opinion burqa ban (2017)
1. Strongly support (43.6%)
2. Support (12.7%)
3. Undecided (12.5%)
4. Oppose (12.3%)
5. Strongly oppose (18.9%)

== See also ==
- Islam in Australia
- Feminism in Islam
