= List of Pakistani journalists =

This is a list of Pakistani journalists from print and electronic media.

== A ==
- Adil Raja
- Aftab Iqbal
- Amin Hafeez
- Ansar Abbasi
- Ayaz Amir
- Abdul Hameed Chapra
- Ardeshir Cowasjee
- Altaf Husain
- Arshad Sharif (1973-2022)
- Aasma Sherazi
- Abid Qaiyum Suleri
- Agha Shorish Kashmiri
- Anthony Mascarenhas
- Asad Ali Toor
- Ayaz Latif Palijo
- Ahmad Nadeem Qasimi
- Ahfaz-ur-Rahman
- Ahmed Rashid
- Ayesha Siddiqa
- Akber Ali Wahidi (1957–2011), sports journalist
- Abdullah Malik (1920–2003)

== B ==
- Siddiq Baloch
- Syed Babar Ali
- Mujahid Barelvi
- Rabiah Jamil Beg
- Sana Bucha
- Meher Bukhari

== C ==
- Chiragh Hasan Hasrat

== E ==
- Eqbal Ahmad

== F ==
- Musharraf Ali Farooqi
- Ian Fyfe

== G ==
- Maulana Ghulam Rasool Mehr
- Sabihuddin Ghausi
- Gharida Farooqi

== H ==
- Hasan Abidi
- Zaib-un-Nissa Hamidullah
- Muhammad Izhar ul Haq
- Irshad Ahmed Haqqani
- Khalid Hasan
- Mehdi Hasan
- Zahida Hina
- Irfan Husain
- Mishal Husain
- Saneeya Hussain
- Talat Hussain
- Hamid Mir
- Hasan Nisar

== I ==
- Imran Aslam
- Imran Riaz Khan
- Iftikhar Ahmad
- Mian Iftikharuddin
- Saba Imtiaz

== J ==
- Javed Jabbar
- Orya Maqbool Jan
- Nusrat Javed

== K ==
- Hayatullah Khan
- Kamran Khan
- Zafar Ali Khan
- Omar Kureishi
- Kiran Nazish
- Khurshid Nadeem

== M ==
- Mansoor Ali Khan
- Minhaj Barna
- Mubasher Lucman
- Javed Malik
- Shahid Masood
- Shireen Mazari
- Mushtaq Minhas
- Hamid Mir
- Janbaz Mirza
- Tahir Mirza
- Jugnu Mohsin
- Saima Mohsin
- Malik Siraj Akbar
- Rana Mubashir

== N ==
- Shahid Nadeem
- Naveen Naqvi
- Zarqa Nawaz
- Zamir Niazi
- Hameed Nizami
- Majid Nizami

== Q ==
- Haider Qureshi

== R ==
- Rais Amrohvi
- Mumtaz Hamid Rao
- Shehrbano Rehman

== S ==
- Somy Ali
- Saleem Safi
- Ghazi Salahuddin
- Ahmad Salim
- Shaheen Sehbai
- Shahzeb Khanzada
- Shah Waliullah Junaidi
- Najam Sethi
- Mahmood Shaam
- Bina Shah
- Riaz Shahid
- Syed Saleem Shahzad
- Mehmood Sham
- Muneeza Shamsie
- Kamal Siddiqi
- Z. A. Suleri

== T ==
- Shaukat Thanvi
- Tahir Hanfi

== W ==
- Wajahat Masood
- Waseem Badami

== Y ==
- Rahimullah Yusufzai

== Z ==
- Muhammad Ismail Zabeeh
- Mahbub Jamal Zahedi
- Fasi Zaka
- Zia Ur Rehman
- Nasim Zehra
- Nasira Zuberi
- Iqbal Zuberi

== See also ==
- List of Pakistanis
- List of television reporters
- Lists of writers
