= Mediagate =

Pakistani political scandal

The Mediagate (also known as Anchorgate), is a common term describing a period of political competition in Pakistan, which eventually led to a media scandal between some mainstream televised news channels, hosted by their anchors and correspondents. On 15 June 2012, an anonymous off-air camera discussion was released on YouTube, it quickly grasped the media industry and attracted nationwide attention.

In a Dunya News (lit. World News) special interview conducted jointly by Mehr Bukhari and Mubashir Lukman, the off-camera video showed anchors informally discussing questions and preparing Riaz Hussain, a real estate oligarch, suggested that the interview was pre-planned to an extent. The footage instigated media war among the television news channels that went head-to-head in a battle for PEMRA's rating each month. The revelation of footage led the deposing of Lukman from Dunya News and at the same time, Dunya News bulletins targeted Geo News of having conspired to embarrass Dunya News, after one of its leading correspondents criticised the channel for being unprofessional. Following this, the media war was further pushed into a new dimension and a larger overall struggle between many of the leading news channels, which accused their rivals of being corrupt, dishonest and sleazy journalism.

Enlightening the profession of journalism and the credibility of their independent 24-hour news cycle sources, the news channels employed many tactics to gain better ratings and reliability over their competitors, including the use of aggressive journalism, cutthroat tactics, and defections of several news correspondents among the news channels. This media war was subsequently ended after a successful intervention and suo motu actions independently taken by the senior justices of the Supreme Court of Pakistan.

== Historical background ==
=== History of electronic media ===
Since the early 1990s, the partial economic boom which resulted by the economic liberalisation, led the rise of the media industry in the country. Since the early 1990s, the privately owned NTM, together with STN, faced generic competition with state-owed PTV over on television ratings and series of commercial programming. However, in 1997, the NTM lost its competition with PTV which led to its final closer, although STN continues to compete with PTV to fill up the gap left by the NTM.

After being liberalised in 2002 by Prime minister Zafarullah Jamali, led the boom of the television industry in the country. Initially, the competition existed between PTV, Geo TV, and ARY TV in the early 2000s, but the competition became more fierce after 2004. The news televisions fiercely compete with other rivals channels regularly for better television ratings. Since 2007, the news channels have covered many high-profile stories and exposed large-scale corruption cases in the state-owned enterprises.

In a media research studies conducted and published by Pakistan Institute of Peace Studies (PIPS), the competition within each channels, electronic media, television stations, and media houses, is greater compared to the printmedia in Pakistan. Since 1999, the printmedia industry greatly reduced in large number, even there was no competition within the printmedia industry. However, the outburst and boom of electronic media has paved away for an intensive competition for viewer's ratings. This rating competition later evolved into "tough" media fight, not only to be the "first to report", but also retain the audience for a longer period.

=== Media-gate begins ===
On 7 June 2012, Pakistani real estate investor Malik Riaz secretly approached a number of country's leading news channels and shared detailed information on camera to provide videos, documentation, and receipts of transferring ₨. 340–400 million (about $3.7 million) made to his fellow businessman Arsalan Iftikhar. The businessman, Arsalan Iftikhar, is the son of the famed Chief Justice Iftikhar Mohammad Chaudhry and claimed that payments were made to Arsalan Iftikhar over the several years to influence over on the Supreme court cases and National Accountability Bureau (NAB) investigations. Riaz's statements were also confirmed by leading lawyer, Aitzaz Ahsan, who claimed to know the existence of such business meetings and payment, and also shared it with Chief Justice Iftikhar Chaudhry a while ago. Riaz also alleged that between 2009 and 2011, Arsalan Iftikhar sponsored his trips to London with credit cards to be used at his discretion.

On 15 June 2012, the behind the scenes footage showing Dunya News anchors Mubashir lukman and Meher Bukhari talking to Malik Riaz during their show surfaced on YouTube under the title "Malik Riaz Planted Interview with Mehar Bokhari and Mubashir Lukman on Dunya Tv". The show aired on the TV channel on Wednesday. In an attempt at damage control, Dunya TV channel's management registered a criminal case against "unidentified" people responsible for publicising off-air footage of a controversial interview with Malik Riaz; no names were put forward as suspects. On 16 June 2012, PEMRA and Supreme Court launched full investigation against the Dunya News headed by two supreme court justices. The Supreme Court of Pakistan issued legal notices to Dunya News and its political correspondents on 29 June 2012.

The rivalry within the news channels heated up when the Aaj TV broadcast and televised the documented records payments allegedly made to the country's top 19 senior-political journalists by Malik Riaz. The documents showed an account of favours allegedly given to these journalists in shapes of money, luxury vehicles, and property recorded in these trademarked letterheads of Bahria Town.

List of allegedly benefited journalists
Beneficiaries	Benefits received	Notes
Mubashir Luqman	Received ₨. 38.5 million in 3 instalments through National Bank as well as a Mercedes-Benz car.	
Dr. Shahid Masood	Received ₨. 10.7 million through National Bank; a total of seven fully paid trips to Dubai, including hotel stays and car rentals.	
Najam Sethi	Received ₨. 19.4 million as well as one Bungalow in Bahria town Lahore and three fully paid trips to the United States, including hotel stays.	
Kamran Khan	Received ₨. 6.2 million with an additional promised of ₨. 20 million; all payments were made by National Bank of Pakistan	A Bungalow in Bahria town in Karachi was also promised to be allotted to him but didn't get until May 2012.
Hassan Nisar	Received ₨. 11 million and a Bungalow in Bahria town in Lahore	
Hamid Mir	Received ₨. 25 million and a plot in Islamabad	
Mazhar Abbas	Received ₨.9 million	
Aftab Iqbal	Received ₨. 20 million	A brand new 2009 Toyota Jeep, and a farm was gifted to him by Malik Riaz
Sana Bucha	Received ₨. 8.3 million	
Muneeb Farooq	Received ₨. 2.5 million	All trips to Dubai were fully afforded and paid by Malik Riaz's industries.
Aasma Sherazi	Received ₨. 4.5 million in one instalment	Interior Minister Rehman Malik had also sponsored her for the holy pilgrim visit to Mecca in 2012
Sami Ibrahim	Received ₨.10 million	Also received a new 2010 Toyota Corolla.
Arshad Sharif	Received ₨. 8.5 million	Promoted as chief news executive director on the request of Malik Riaz
Nusrat Javed	Received ₨.7.8 million	
Mushtaq Minhas	Received ₨. 5.5 million	
Javed Chaudhry	Received ₨. 300,000 per column he writes in support of the Malik Riaz	
Marvi Sarmad	Received ₨. 1 million	
Sohail Warraich	Received ₨. 1.5 million	Also received 2008 Honda Civic car
Meher Bukhari	Received ₨.5 million gift on her wedding	Her spouse, Kashif Abbasi, did a show against Riaz whether for only "obliging" her wife or some other reasons.

=== Accusations and response from news channels ===
The Dunya News management immediately sacked Luqman while his fellow anchorwoman Meher Bukhari was asked to resign within 24 hours or get sacked. Accusations and the use of aggressive journalism was employed, when Dunya News televised the accusations against its rival Geo News, claiming how the channel had lied to people at several occasions and backtracked, and talking to the people on the streets who instantly supported Dunya News for its upright stance and morals, all is still not well on the air waves. Dunya News posted on its website that Geo News was "admonished for airing baseless news against the judiciary" in Arsalan case order. In an upsetting move, leading woman news anchor, Sana Bucha, resigned from GEO News and defected to Dunya News, purportedly in protest of Geo's rehiring of Aamir Liaquat.

Other media outlets and television channels went head-to-head for PEMRA's top channel ratings and levelled accusations, and aired talk shows against each other. Raza Rumi of Jinnah Institute quoted to New York Times that "the credibility of the electronic media is at stake. This is starting to look like the scam of the year." Other media outlets and television channels went head-to-head for PEMRA's rating and levelled accusations, and aired talk shows against each other. The defection of media personalities continued and Luqman and his team was quickly hired by the rival television, the ARY News. While Hamid Mir and others criticised Lucman's team of joining the ARY News; the criticism was also given to GEO News for awarding a contract to Amir Liaquat, after making a controversial remarks regarding to the Supreme court. The listed anchors refuted the allegations levelled up against them. Mehar Bukhari threatened to direct the case of her innocence to supreme court. Other alleged benefactors, Nusrat Javed called Riaz's character as "flawed" and quickly denied the bribery allegations. On a live TV show, Today with Kamran Khan, its host, Kamran Khan, strongly denied the allegations and quoted: "I will leave this profession if proven guilty of bribery"

== End of Mediagate ==
=== Supreme Court intervention ===
After the news of Mediagate and accusations against each other aired on television channels, the senior justices of the Supreme Court and the Chief Justice Iftikhar Muhammad Chaudhry took independent sou mote actions against Malik Riaz and the television channels. Constituting a judicial bench to hear this case, the supreme court actions also took notice of the Mediagate after the leak of the footage of which Riaz claimed to have paid television stations for vast media interests in the legal cases.

The PEMRA and Supreme Court launches and the full court session and ordered the Pemra to submit a comprehensive report on the issue. The Supreme Court also constituted a two-member bench to investigate the matter and criminal charges were pressed on Malik Riaz. According to the registrar note, a conspiracy to defame the judiciary was being hatched in the show, and an attempt to make a mockery of the judiciary and the judges was also observed in the leaked video.

== Aftermath ==
=== Naming Convention ===
While rumours swirled among the Capital insiders, the public at large was kept in the dark until recently when a video of Shaheen Sehbai talking about it surfaced on YouTube and forced the mainstream media to finally discuss it on air here is the video link of Shaheen Sehbai's interview on YouTube There many names attributed of this scandalous incident. The media first reported this scandal as Arsalangate (in reference to Arsalan Iftikhar) and Bahriagate in respect to Malik Riaz. But due to channels rivalries, the scandal was popularised as "Media-gate".

=== Legacy ===
Despite the allegations on news channels, the news channels altogether greatly questioned the credibility of the payments made to the allegedly listed journalists. Television hosts, Hamid Mir, Shahid Masood, Meher Bokhari, Mushtaq Minhas, Nusrat Javed, Talat Hussain, Hasan Nisar, and Mubashir Luqman, denied all the allegations and terming it as "fraudulent". Writing a weekly column in Daily Times, the media researcher and columnist Dr.Qaisar Rashid maintains that the monthly ratings of talkshows will remain a great matter for the news channels and that the viewers will be befooled in the name of enlightening them on various issues through conducting talkshows till the time the media keeps presenting itself as a buyable commodity. According to the New York Times, the competition for ratings is even more tough and fierce during the holy month of Ramadan among Pakistan's television stations.

Mediagate exposed the covert but deeply intense rivalry among the television news channels. Recent government financial declassified documents showed that the advertisements given to news channels by the government did not follow any logic of ratings nor any principle of transparency in dispensing "tax-payers" money. The documents corroborate claims that certain channels gained ratings through receiving advertisement revenue from the government that was disproportionate to their viewership share, raising serious questions about the motives for doling out arbitrary disbursements.

== See also ==
- Memogate, a 2011 controversy about an alleged Pakistani memo seeking the help of the US Government
- Mass media culture
- List of -gate scandals and controversies
