= Kamran Khan Show =

Kamran Khan Show may refer to:

- Aaj Kamran Khan Kay Sath, the news show broadcast by Geo News formerly known as Kamran Khan Show
- Aaj Shahzeb Khanzada Kay Sath, the news show that replaced Aaj Kamran Khan Kay Sath
- Dunya Kamran Khan Kay Sath, the news show broadcast by Dunya News.
