= Ayesha Bakhsh =

TV journalist in Pakistan

- عائشہ بخش
- Born: 4 July 1981 (age 44); Pakpattan, Punjab, Pakistan
- Education: Master of Science degree (Communication Sciences)
- Occupations: TV News anchor, journalist, Host
- Years active: 2007-present
- Employers: GNN (news channel) (2018); Geo News (2007-2018); Samaa TV (2023-present)
- Spouse: Adnan Amin (m. 2012)
- Relatives: Zeeshan Bakhsh, journalist (brother)
- Awards: Pakistan Media Awards in 2012 and 2014; Agahi Awards for excellence in journalism in 2016 and 2017

Ayesha Bakhsh (عائشہ بخش) (born 4 July 1981) is a Pakistani television news anchor and TV journalist.

She is known for her work on Pakistan's major TV news channel Geo News, where as an anchorperson, she hosted the TV program 'Report Card' for 11 years.

== Early life ==
Ayesha Bakhsh was born on 4 July 1981 in Pakpattan District, Punjab, Pakistan. She is the daughter of Mian Mohammad Bakhsh and Rubina Bakhsh. She has three siblings: two brothers, Zeeshan Bakhsh (a journalist associated with Dawn News Lahore) and Osman Bakhsh, and a sister, Saima Bakhsh. Bakhsh received schooling at St. Mary Convent School, Sahiwal. She later studied at Fatima Jinnah Women University, Rawalpindi, and earned a master's degree in Communication Sciences.

== Career ==
Before working for Geo News, Bakhsh worked as an anchor on ARY News. Later, in January 2007, Ayesha joined Geo Television and is currently Pakistan's Geo TV's senior newscaster. Her first appearance on television as an anchor was on Geo's programme, Nazim Hazir Ho. She also hosted Crisis Cell, Aaj Kamran Khan Kay Saath, and Leikin during the absence of their permanent hosts. As of 2015, she hosts the talk show News Room and she also hosted a new talkshow Report Card on Geo News.

At present, she is working on GNN (news channel).

She was part of a 12-member delegation of journalists from the mainstream media in Pakistan which visited Beijing, China, on 4 July 2011.
