= Wajahat Saeed Khan =

Pakistani journalist (born 1978)

- Born: Wajahat Saeed Khan; November 5, 1978 (age 47)
- Other name: WSK
- Education: University of Michigan Harvard Kennedy School Columbia University
- Occupation: Journalist

Wajahat Saeed Khan is a Pakistani journalist based in the United States. Khan has produced, reported and anchored for Pakistan's major cable networks, as well as leading U.S., U.K. and Indian publications.

Khan was a producer and correspondent for NBC News in Islamabad and Kabul, and the National Security Correspondent for Dunya News. He has also contributed to CNN, The Times and India Today, but is best known as the anchor and editor of the primetime show Mahaaz (The Front), which he produced from 2015 till 2018. From 2019 to 2023, he was an editor and correspondent at Nikkei Asia.

== Early life and education ==
Khan was born in Quetta, Balochistan to a family of civil servants from the Pashtun Yusufzai tribe. He attended Karachi Grammar School, where he was selected as editor of the school magazine, The Grammarian, considered Pakistan's oldest print publication. He went on to the University of Michigan, majoring in political science and history, reporting and editing on campus for The Michigan Daily. At Michigan, Khan became the only collegiate journalist to cover the US invasion of Afghanistan after the 9/11 attacks.

== Career ==
Khan's broadcast career started after his return from Michigan, when electronic media was deregulated in Pakistan in the early 2000s by the regime of General (retired) Pervez Musharraf. He joined the country's largest media house, the Jang Group of Newspapers, as Manager of News Product Development and Strategy before switching to news production. Khan was at Jang Media Group's Geo News, the country's primary cable news network, from 2003 to 2007. He then helped launch Dawn News, Pakistan's first English-based news network, in 2007. At Dawn, his broadcast career took off with the interview series Talk Back; he also became the first Pakistani to produce an investigative interview series from India for Talk Back: Eye on India. Pivoting to documentaries, Khan produced the first independent documentary series on the Pakistani military, We Are Soldiers (2009), which was eventually banned by the Pakistan Electronic Media Regulatory Authority, prompting him to leave Dawn the next year.

Khan relocated to New York City in 2010. In 2011, Khan was nominated as the first Pakistani and youngest Goldsmith Fellow by the Shorenstein Center on Media, Politics and Public Policy, Harvard Kennedy School. At the Shorenstein Center, Khan authored a study about the rise of militancy and hate content on Pakistani social media.

Khan did a short stint for CNN in 2011–2012 before moving on to produce and then correspond for NBC News from Islamabad, Kabul, Kathmandu, London, and New York.

From 2012 till 2013, Khan pivoted from English broadcast to Urdu, and conducted the series Ikhtilaf ["Opposition"], for Karachi-based AAJ TV. In 2013, he joined Jang Media Group again, but in the new capacity of the National Security Editor of Pakistan's largest media house. His writings at The News International and Daily Jang focused on the Pakistani military.

In 2015, he joined BOL Network before resigning due to the Axact scandal. He then joined Dunya News as the anchor and editor of the field-reporting series Mahaaz.

Khan received an Emmy Award for Outstanding Breaking News Coverage in 2015 for NBC's reporting on the April 2015 Nepal earthquake.

In 2016, Khan conducted an investigation—"Who's Watching the Watchdogs"—on the practices of officials linked to the Pakistan chapter of Transparency International. Further coverage saw him write several international opinion pieces in US publications such as The Washington Times and The Hill.

In July 2018, along with coverage of Pakistan's 10th general elections, Khan completed 200 episodes of Mahaaz (The Front). For long-form investigative pieces, he also founded The Bureau of Investigative Reporting, a not-for-profit reporting collective that pursues journalism for the public benefit and covers issues usually not covered by the mainstream media in Pakistan.

In summer 2019, before moving to New York for a master's degree in Business and Financial Reporting at Columbia Journalism School, Khan published his first book with HarperCollins—Game Changer: Being Shahid Afridi, a biography of cricketer Shahid Afridi.

Khan is a nonresident senior fellow with the Atlantic Council's South Asia Center. He also serves as the founder and CEO of Pak Futures Foundation.

As of 2026, Khan works as a freelance journalist and runs a YouTube channel and Substack newsletter reporting on political developments.

== Legal affairs ==
On 12 June 2023, Islamabad Police filed a First Information Report (FIR) against Khan, alongside fellow journalist Shaheen Sehbai and others, accusing them of "abetting mutiny" and inciting attacks on the Pakistani military, under Pakistan Army Act Section 131 and related terrorism and sedition charges under the Anti-Terrorism Act, for their coverage of the May 9 riots. Reporters Without Borders and the Committee to Protect Journalists condemned the FIR as transnational repression of journalists. Khan denied the allegations as fabricated and politically motivated efforts to silence critics and asserted that they stemmed from his coverage of Pakistani military events involving individuals with links to militant groups like Lashkar-e-Taiba. On 1 January 2026, an Anti-Terrorism Court in Islamabad convicted Khan in absentia and sentenced him to two consecutive life terms, along with Sehbai, Adil Raja and other journalists.

In 2025, Khan's media platforms, including his YouTube channel, were blocked in Pakistan and India amid the 2025 India–Pakistan crisis.

== Works ==
=== Television ===
We Are Soldiers (2009), a documentary television series for Dawn News about Pakistani military structure including the Special Service Group (SSG). The Pakistan Electronic Media Regulatory Authority banned the documentary series, without formal explanation, when an upcoming episode on the SSG was about to air.

=== Books ===
Afridi, Shahid; Khan, Wajahat S. (2019). Game Changer: Being Shahid Afridi. HarperCollins India. ISBN 978-93-5302-671-4.
