= Arshad Sharif =

Pakistani journalist (1973–2022)

- ارشد شریف
- Sharif in 2013
- Born: 22 February 1973; Karachi, Pakistan
- Died: 23 October 2022 (aged 49); Kajiado, Kenya
- Cause of death: killed by police
- Resting place: H-11 graveyard, Islamabad, Pakistan
- Education: Gordon College (BA Journalism); Quaid-e-Azam University (MPA); Ulster University (MA Media Studies)
- Occupations: News anchor Analyst
- Employer: ARY News (2014-2022)
- Known for: Power Play TV Show ARY News; News Reporter at Dawn News; TV Show Kyun? (Why?) at Dunya News
- Notable credit(s): Anchor ARY News; Bureau Chief ARY News (Islamabad); News anchor Dunya TV; Former Director News, Aaj News; Former Director News, Dunya TV
- Television: ARY News, Dunya News, Dawn News
- Children: 5
- Parent: Muhammad Sharif Butt (father) Navy Commander
- Relatives: Ashraf Sharif (brother)
- Awards: Pride of Performance; Agahi Award; Asian Investigative Media Award; War Correspondent Award

YouTube information
- Channel: Arshad Sharif Official
- Years active: 2017–2022
- Subscribers: 446,000
- Views: 15.1 million
- Last updated: 4 August 2026
- Website: www.reportersdiary.com

Arshad Sharif PP (Urdu: ارشد شریف; 22 February 1973 – 23 October 2022) was a Pakistani journalist, writer, and news anchor. He specialized in investigative journalism and covered many political events in the country for national and international news organisations. On 23 March 2019, he was awarded the Pride of Performance by the President of Pakistan Arif Alvi, for his contribution to journalism. He was shot and killed by police in Kenya on 22 October 2022. A 592-page report by the Pakistani Federal Investigation Agency (FIA) revealed the killing to be a “planned targeted assassination," claiming that Kenyan police were "used as instruments." He was an outspoken critic of the Pakistani army.

Sharif was the host of the program Power Play on ARY News. He served on AAJ News as News Director. Prior to joining AAJ, he was director news at Dunya News and hosted the program Kyun.

== Early life and education ==
Arshad Sharif was born in Karachi, Pakistan, to a Commander of the Pakistan Navy, Muhammad Sharif TI(M) TK. He began his journalistic career as a freelancer in 1993, while he was still a student. He received his Master of Science in Public Administration from Quaid-i-Azam University in Islamabad.

== Journalistic career ==
Sharif's first media job was with a weekly publication, Pulse, for which he was a columnist, reporter, and managing editor in 1999. He joined The News in 1999 and Daily Dawn in 2001.

Sharif covered conflicts in the Federally Administered Tribal Areas with a specialization in defence and foreign affairs. He reported for leading Pakistani news organizations from London, Paris, Strasbourg, and Kiel. He was the winner of the 2012 Agahi Award. Sharif as anchor and Adeel Raja as producer won the 2016 Investigative Journalist of the Year Award for the programme Powerplay. In 2018, Sharif was awarded Agahi's Peoples’ Choice Awards: Favourite Current Affairs Anchor – Male.

He started his programme Power Play on ARY News in 2014.

Sharif also headed AAJ News and Dunya TV as 'Director News'. He worked as a Bureau Chief for Dawn News in 2011.

In August 2022, Sharif fled Pakistan to avoid arrest after a number of accusations, including sedition charges over an interview with PTI leader Shahbaz Gill, during which the latter had made controversial comments. Alleging threats to his life, Sharif moved to Dubai and later to Kenya.

== Assassination ==
Sharif was shot and killed in Kajiado, Kenya, by local police on 23 October 2022. The Kenyan police described the shooting as a case of "mistaken identity", and there was speculation on social media that he had been assassinated. On 24 October, the Kenyan Independent Police Oversight Authority announced an investigation into Sharif's death. An investigation committee consisting of Athar Waheed, director of the Federal Investigation Agency's headquarters, and Umar Shahid Hamid, deputy director of the Intelligence Bureau was formed on 26 October 2022. Subsequently, on 8 November 2022, Prime Minister Shehbaz Sharif requested Chief Justice Umar Ata Bandial to set up a judicial committee to investigate into the murder in a fair and reliable manner. Bandial announced on 6 December 2022 that he had taken a suo moto notice of the killing.

In July 2024, the Kajiado County High Court found police acted unlawfully and ordered the government to pay 10 million Kenyan shillings (US$78,000) in compensation.

=== Reaction ===
News of Sharif's killing was met with shock in Pakistan and abroad. The President of Pakistan Arif Alvi described Sharif's death as "a great loss to journalism and Pakistan". The Prime Minister of Pakistan Shehbaz Sharif described the killing as "shocking news". Former Prime Minister Imran Khan wrote on Twitter that he was "shocked at the brutal murder of Arshad Sharif who paid the ultimate price for speaking the truth - his life".

Afzal Butt, president of the Pakistan Federal Union of Journalists (PFUJ), expressed his grief at the news and called for an inquiry into the killing of Sharif. Journalist Kamran Khan questioned the government on Twitter and asked the Prime Minister to take "the nation in confidence".

A significant number of people attended Arshad Sharif's funeral prayers. Close friends and colleagues arrived at Sharif's home to express their condolences, including Imran Khan and Sheikh Rasheed Ahmad.

The killing of Arshad Sharif was condemned by the Director-General of UNESCO Audrey Azoulay in a press-release published on 26 October 2022. UNESCO's mandate to “promote the free flow of ideas by word and image” includes the protection of journalists and media workers against any forms of attacks and reprisals related to their duties. The facts and circumstances surrounding this killing are categorized and archived online on UNESCO's Observatory of Killed Journalists. The Observatory archives publicly accessible information on all the journalists killed in relation to their duties since 1997, where the Director-General has issued a condemnation.

== Personal life ==
Arshad Sharif's father, Commander Muhammad Sharif, died of a heart attack at the Armed Forces Institute of Cardiology in May 2011. His younger brother, Major Ashraf Sharif, was killed when his car veered off the road on his way to attend the funeral of their father in May 2011. On hearing about the death of his father, Major Ashraf Sharif left Bannu Cantonment and refused a chauffeur or escort. A few kilometres away, his vehicle veered off the road and hit a tree, killing him. Commander Muhammad Sharif and Major Ashraf Sharif were buried with full military honours at the H-11 Graveyard. Arshad and Somiya Arshad were married in 2001.

== Awards and recognition ==
- Pride of Performance Award in 2019 by the President of Pakistan
- Agahi Award for Journalism in 2012

== See also ==
- List of Pakistani journalists
- List of Pakistani writers
