= Kashif Abbasi =

Pakistani journalist & anchor (born 1974)

- كاشف عباسی
- Born: 10 December 1974 (age 51); Jhelum, Punjab, Pakistan
- Citizenship: Pakistan
- Education: Barani Institute of Information Technology, UAAR, Rawalpindi
- Occupations: Journalist; News anchor
- Spouse: Meher Abbasi
- Writing career
- Subjects: Social, Politics

Kashif Abbasi (Urdu: کاشِف عباسی) is a Pakistani talk show host who formerly hosted the current political talk show Off the Record on the news channel ARY News.

== Career ==
In January 2020, Pakistan Electronic Media Regulatory Authority (PEMRA) banned the broadcast of Abbasi's programme Off the Record on ARY News for 60 days, following Faisal Vawda's appearance on his show alongside Qamar Zaman Kaira and Senator Muhammad Javed Abbasi.

== Personal life ==
His mother, Shahnaz Abbasi, died in 2020. In November 2011, Abbasi announced his marriage to Dunya News journalist Meher Bukhari. In June 2012, his wife became involved in a mediagate scandal involving property tycoon Malik Riaz.
