= Saleem Safi =

Pakistani journalist, columnist, defence analyst

- سلیم صافی
- Born: 7 March 1968 (age 58); Mardan, West Pakistan, Pakistan (Now, Khyber Pakhtunkhwa, Pakistan)
- Education: PHD
- Occupations: Newspaper columnist TV Anchorperson
- Years active: 2007-present
- Employer(s): Geo News (2011-present); PTV News (2007-2011)
- Television: Geo News (2011-present)
- Awards: PTV Award for 'Best TV Compere' (2002); Agahi Award 'Journalist of the year 2021'

Saleem Safi (Urdu: سلیم صافی; born 7 March 1968) is a Pakistani journalist and talk show host for the show Jirga. He specializes in foreign policy, terrorism, Kashmir conflict, Afghan conflict and the politics of Pakistan.

He is associated with Jang Media Group and hosts an Urdu talkshow on Geo News, called Jirga.

== Early life and education ==
Safi was born on 7 March 1968. He belongs to the Mulagore tribe and hails from the Mardan District of Khyber Pakhtunkhwa province in Pakistan. He graduated from the University of Peshawar and is based in Islamabad.

== Career ==
Safi specialises in issues concerning Afghan conflict, Khyber Pakhtunkhwa and Pakistan's tribal areas. He hosts Jirga, a talkshow on Geo. He also writes columns for the Urdu language newspaper Daily Jang and the English language The News International.

After his studies, Safi began his career as a reporter for NNI (News Network International) in Mardan. Where he rose to the post of Bureau Chief of NNI in Peshawar. As Bureau Chief, he covered all of Khyber Pakhtunkhwa, FATA and Afghanistan. Then he started writing columns for national newspapers. From 2000 to 2008 Saleem's columns in Daily Mashriq, Daily Aaj and Daily Pakistan were praised for their in-depth coverage of an emerging situation in the pre and post 9/11 scenario. Pakistani politics, foreign policy, Afghanistan and socio religious issues have all been discussed by him through his writings in more than one thousand columns.

In 2004, Safi published the book Afghanistan: The Role of US, Taliban and Pakistani Religious Parties. Saleem also started in electronic media following the media boom in Pakistan. He hosted his own prime time Pashto talkshow, Jirga from PTV Peshawar from 2002 to 2004. Due to popular demand he again started the show but on PTV World, "Saleem Safi Kay Saath" in Urdu in 2005 from Islamabad, which he hosted till 2008. From 2007 to 2008, he also hosted a talk show, Siyasat on the Pashto language TV channel Khyber.

At the end of 2008, he joined Jang Media Group and Geo TV as an anchor, columnist and analyst. He hosts a show with the name Jirga, and writes in the News and Jang with the same name. Saleem's talk shows and documentaries are widely seen across the country. He has conducted interviews of many national and international leaders and stakeholders in the region such as Nawaz Sharif, Pervez Musharraf, Asif Ali Zardari, Hamid Karzai, Fazal-ur-Rehman, Gulbadin Hikmatyar, Burhanuddin Rabbani, Abdullah Abdullah and other political, religious and jihadi leaders.

He has hosted current affairs programmes, Saleem Safi Kay Saath on TV channels such as PTV News, the Pashto-language AVT Khyber and serves as the host of GEO News TV talk show Jirga.

He has also written columns for the Daily Jang, an Urdu language newspaper. He is often invited as a commentator on BBC News and Voice of America's Pashto language programs as an expert on Afghanistan and Khyber Pakhtunkhwa, Pakistan.

== Awards and recognition ==
- PTV Award for 'Best Compere of Current Affairs' TV program in 2002.
- Agahi Award for excellence in journalism, 'Journalist of the Year 2021'.

== Books ==
- Afghanistan: US, Taliban, Aur Pakistan Ki Deeni Juma'aton Ka Kirdar (Afghanistan: The role of US, Taliban and Pakistan's religious parties)
- Attock ta Adyala
- Aur Tabdeeli Laayee Gayee
- China Pakistan Economic Corridor- Myth & Reality
- Aur Tabdeeli Gale Par Gayi
- Dirty War 2001–2023

پاکستان میں دہشت گردی کے خلاف جنگ کی چشم دید اور چشم کشا کہانی
