= Death of Arshad Sharif =

2022 killing in Kajiado, Kenya

- Location: Kajiado, Kenya
- Date: 23 October 2022
- Target: Arshad Sharif
- Attack type: Shooting
- Deaths: 1
- Perpetrator: Local police (claimed as mistaken identity)
- Motive: Unknown, possible assassination

Arshad Sharif, a Pakistani journalist, was shot and killed in Kajiado, Kenya, by local police on 23 October 2022. The Kenyan police described the shooting as a case of "mistaken identity", and there was speculation on social media that he had been assassinated.

The late journalist's mother accused senior Pakistani intelligence officers of their involvement in the murder, including the then-Army Chief General Bajwa, and head of the ISI, Nadeem Anjum, for the "targeted, premeditated, planned and calculated murder" of her son. In a letter to the Chief Justice of Pakistan, Sharif's mother alleged Arshad's relations with the military soured following his criticism on the passing of the vote-of-no-confidence against Pakistani Prime Minister Imran Khan, particularly drawing the ire of the military leadership in a program “Woh Kon Tha”, aired on May 31, 2022 on ARY, which insinuated that the military, led by General Bajwa, was behind Khan's overthrow. Sharif's mother further alleged that he began receiving threats from army spokesman Shafiq Malik of the DGISPR, and the ISI, who warned that he would "face dire consequences." However, neither the federal government nor the Chief Justice has filed an FIR or pursued an investigation based on her complaint and allegations. Similarly, Arshad's wife Somiya, in her official statement to investigators, also accused the military leadership of threatening and trailing Arshad until he fled the country after receiving numerous warnings of assassination attempts. Somiya claimed that Arshad's visa and subsequent exit from Dubai was committed at the "connivance of Pakistan's military leadership which enjoys [an] excellent relationship with UAE Government."

== Investigation committee ==
The formation of an inquiry committee to look into the circumstances surrounding the murder of investigative journalist Arshad has been announced by Pakistan's Prime Minister Shehbaz Sharif on 26 October 2022.

According to a notification, the two-member committee made up of Athar Waheed, director of the Federal Investigation Agency's headquarters, and Umar Shahid Hamid, deputy director of the Intelligence Bureau, would travel to Kenya and present its findings to the Interior Ministry.

The investigation team in Kenya, met with the acting Kenyan police head and representatives of the Pakistan High Commission in Kenya to discuss the Arshad Sharif murder case. They had recorded the testimony of two brothers Khurram Ahmed and Waqar Ahmed who had given the murdered journalist lodging and other services while he was in Kenya. The Kenyan authorities also received Sharif's iPad and smartphone.

The team that travelled to Kenya to look into the murder of journalist Arshad returned home on 8 November 2022, after doing their inquiry. while in Kenya, the investigating team gathered information about the Arshad Sharif case. The team received cooperation from the Pakistani embassy and foreign ministry for better fact-finding. The investigation team gave the interior ministry its report.

=== Fact-finding report ===
On December 12, the Government of Pakistan released its Fact-Finding Report under the Ministry of Interior and submitted to the Supreme Court in its suo moto proceedings.

The report found that:

- Sharif's murder had been "pre-planned" and "targeted".

- There were inconsistencies between the murder weapons, bullets, and Arshad's injuries, and contradictions in the statements of Khurram Ahmed, a key suspect with ties to US, Kenyan and Pakistani intelligence, who was driving Arshad during the incident.

- A dozen FIRs were filed against Arshad whilst he was in Pakistan. Most of them alleged he was "involved in false propaganda against [the] Pakistan Armed Forces and [Army Chief General Bajwa]", and were "registered without due diligence" by the officers filing the reports.

- In her statement to investigators, Arshad's mother expressed distrust in any commissions launched by the federal government related to her son's death, whilst his wife revealed Arshad was forced to leave Dubai by government authorities without reason.

== Pakistan's judicial inquiry ==
The Chief Justice of Pakistan (CJP), Umar Ata Bandial, has been asked by Prime Minister Shehbaz Sharif to set up a judicial committee to conduct a fair and reliable investigation into the murder of Sharif. The chief justice was requested by the prime minister to form a commission made up of all the highest courts' available judges to investigate the circumstances surrounding the journalist's murder. According to the letter, the panel might concentrate on the following five issues about the circumstances surrounding the murder:

- What steps did Sharif take to travel abroad in August 2022, and who made those arrangements?
- Was the threat made against Sharif known to any federal or provincial agencies, institutions, or administrations?
- What conditions and motives compelled Sharif to fly from the United Arab Emirates to Kenya?
- What actually happened during the shooting incident that resulted in Arshad Sharif's death?
- Is Sharif's death really the product of a misidentification or was it a "criminal game"?

The prime minister declared in this context that the federal government would provide the judicial commission with complete cooperation. After the murder, a commission made up of senior officials was dispatched to Kenya.

== Kenyan judicial proceedings ==
In July 2024, the Kajiado County High Court found police acted unlawfully and ordered the government to pay 10 million Kenyan shillings (US $78,000) in compensation.

== Reactions ==
News of Sharif's killing was met with shock in Pakistan and abroad. The President of Pakistan Arif Alvi described Sharif's death as "a great loss to journalism and Pakistan". The Prime Minister of Pakistan Shehbaz Sharif described the killing as "shocking news". Former Prime Minister Imran Khan wrote on Twitter that he was "shocked at the brutal murder of Arshad Sharif who paid the ultimate price for speaking the truth - his life". many pakistani news websites changed their logos to black and white and did special programs upon learning his death.

Afzal Butt, president of the Pakistan Federal Union of Journalists (PFUJ), expressed his grief at the news and called for an inquiry into the killing of Sharif. Journalist Kamran Khan questioned the government on Twitter and asked the Prime Minister to take "the nation in confidence".

A significant number of people attended Arshad Sharif's funeral prayers. Close friends and colleagues arrived at Sharif's home to express their condolences, including Imran Khan and Sheikh Rasheed Ahmad.
