= Dunya Kamran Khan Kay Sath =

- Also known as: Kamran Khan Show
- Genre: Current affairs Talk show
- Presented by: Kamran Khan
- Country of origin: Pakistan
- Original language: Urdu
- No. of episodes: 500+

Production
- Production location: Karachi
- Running time: 90 minutes

Original release
- Network: Dunya News
- Release: 3 August 2015 – 24 August 2024

Dunya Kamran Khan Kay Sath (Urdu: دنیا کامران خان کے ساتھ lit. World with Kamran Khan) was a television current affairs talk show on Dunya News. The show was hosted by journalist Kamran Khan. It tried to untangle the twists and turns of Pakistani politics, social and economic issues. The program covered major national, regional and international stories through a combination of high-profile interviews, special reports, commentary and analysis. It was broadcast live from Karachi on weekdays from 9:30 to 11:00 pm.

== Background ==
The show was launched on 3 August 2015 and ended 24 August 2024. It is the resumption of the Aaj Kamran Khan Kay Sath, which was discontinued when Kamran Khan left Geo News and joined the BOL Network as President and Editor-in-Chief. Following the Axact scam, he resigned from the post and following the collapse BOL even before it was launched, Khan joined Dunya Media Group as President and Editor-in-Chief.

== Format ==
The show follows the traditional anchor-driven model of late night television talk shows. Kamran Khan, utilizing the skills learnt from decades in the news media, creates a verbose yet approachable narrative and in doing so deftly articulates viewpoints on current affairs in an understandable manner. This is then followed by a more in-depth investigation into the issue at hand, and usually individuals involved in the topic at hand are brought in for their views on the topic.

== Anchor ==
Kamran Khan holds numerous achievements in his decades long stint as journalist and media person. He has served as reporter to numerous international newspapers, such as The Sunday Times and the Washington Post. He is known for his close placement to many events in Pakistani history, from the state's first conducted nuclear tests, to the Daniel Pearl saga, and beyond.
