= Iftikhar Ahmad (political activist) =

TV journalist

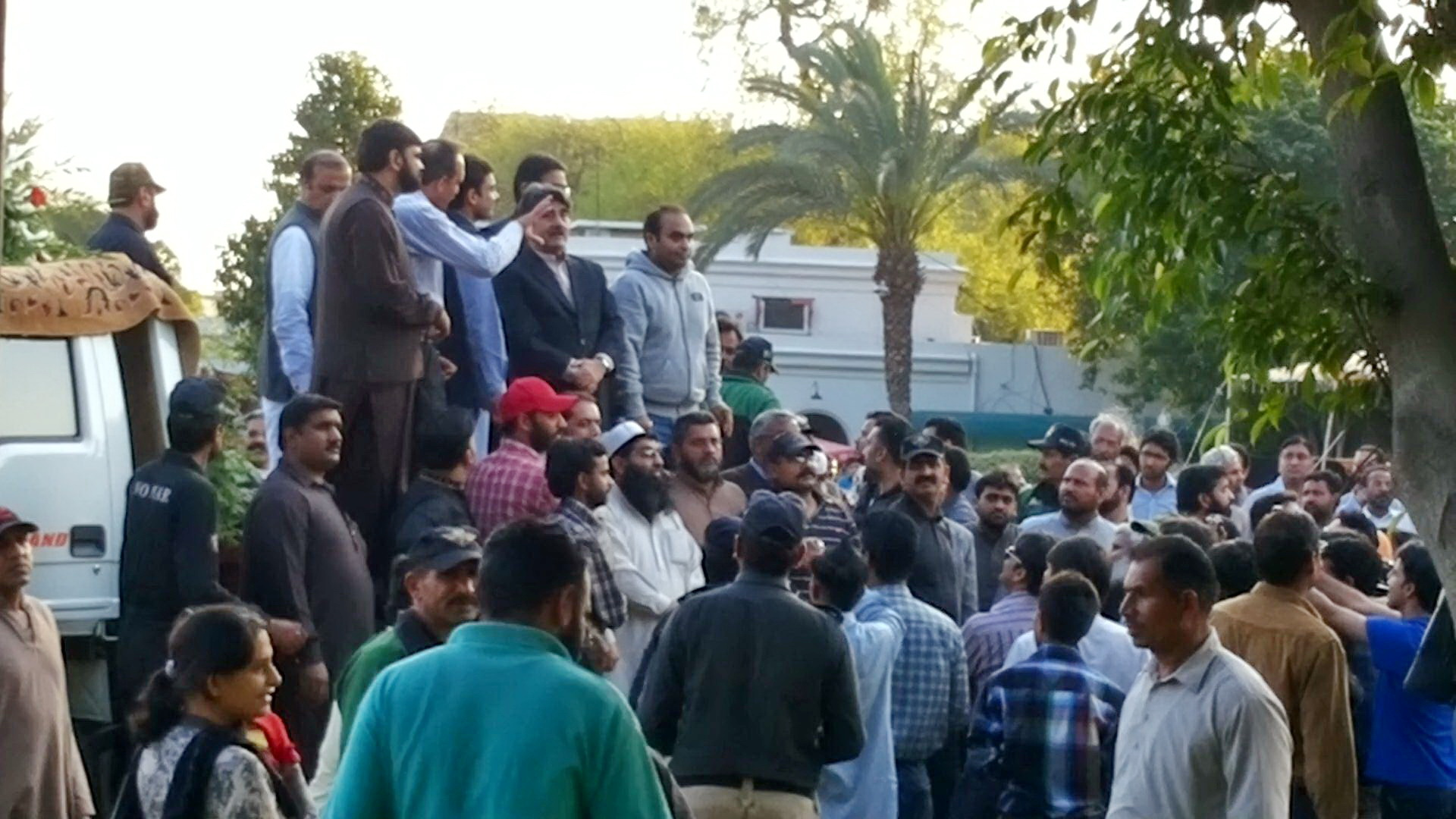
- Iftikhar Ahmad, second from right
- Born: Iftikhar Ahmad; 4 November 1950 (age 75); Rawalpindi - Pakistan
- Other name: Iftikhar Ahmed
- Occupations: Broadcaster, journalist, and anchor
- Years active: 1984 – Present
- Notable credit(s): Has headed the Election Cell for Jang Group (1988–97); Geo News (2002 – 2014); BOL News (2014 – 2015); Dunya News (2015 – 2016); Geo News (2016 –2018)
- Relatives: Maulana Hifz-ur-Rehman (grandfather)

Iftikhar Ahmad (Urdu: افتخار احمد; born 4 November 1950) is a Pakistani political activist.

== See also ==
- List of Pakistani journalists
- Hamid Mir
