= Suhail Warraich =

Pakistani television host

Sohail Warraich
- Born: Jauharabad, Punjab, Pakistan
- Education: MA degree in English literature from the University of the Punjab
- Occupations: Journalist (TV and print journalist)
- Years active: 1999-present
- Employer: Geo News (2002-present)
- Awards: Pride of Performance award by the President of Pakistan in 2024

Sohail Sarwar Warraich (Urdu: سہیل وڑایچ; born 1961) is a Pakistani journalist and television host.

He is also a human rights activist and writer.

== Career ==
Warraich was born in Jauharbad, Khushab (a district in Punjab, Pakistan). He belongs to Warraich clan of the Jat community. Warraich holds a master's degree in English literature from the University of the Punjab. He has been affiliated with Geo News Television since its inception and had started his journalism career in print media in 1990. Warraich is the host of the Geo TV Programme Aik Din Geo Kay Sath, an interview-based TV program on lifestyles of celebrities. He also used to host Left Right, a political talk show posing right-wing and left-wing political arguments. Warraich used to support the left wing on this TV show. He used to come on a programme Meray Mutabiq every Sunday, a talk show based on Warraich's analytical views on current issues along with TV journalists Hassan Nisar and Iftikhar Ahmad. Sohail Warraich is also a human rights activist responsible for Amnesty International Pakistan's Human Rights Project.

The core of the debate is not whether Warraich verbally supports democracy, but whether his actions and commentary serve to strengthen or weaken it. To his critics, his recent work is evidence that he represents the establishment, and his professed belief in democracy is secondary to maintaining a positive relationship with powerful military generals. To his defenders, he is navigating the complex and delicate political landscape of Pakistan, where the military is an undeniable power player. In his view, his work offers pragmatic commentary rather than overt support. Warraich joined Dunya News as Executive Director on 23 January 2017. Later, he rejoined Geo TV in 2020.

== Journalism style ==
Warraich is known for his direct and blunt questioning style and sarcastic speaking tone and humour. His tag line 'Kia yeh khula tazzad nahin?' is very famous among the comedians and have been frequently repeated in several TV shows. He has conducted interviews with a number of high-profile personalities and political figures and is given credit for his journalistic skills where he was able to extract interesting revelations from some prominent personalities of Pakistan.

Warraich is considered to be an authority on Punjab's political families, clans or 'biradari' system voting trend prevalent in Punjab's election politics. He also has been actively playing a human rights activist role in Pakistan where he opposes the honor killing of women by her immediate family members.

== Awards and recognition ==
In 2024, he was awarded the President's Pride of Performance award for his contributions to Journalism by the President of Pakistan.

== Books ==
- Qatil Kaun?
- Ghaddar Kaun? (2006) (based on interviews when Nawaz Sharif was in exile in Saudi Arabia)
- Gernailun Ki Siasat
- Adalia Ke Urooj Ki Kahani
- Mazhabi Siasat Ke Tazadaat
- Chotay Soobay Punjab Se Naraz Keun
- The Party is Over (2018) (inside stories of the disqualification of former Prime Minister Nawaz Sharif)
