= Mirza Shahzad Akbar =

Pakistani politician

Advisor to the Prime Minister on Interior and Accountability (Federal Minister)
- In office 22 July 2020 – 24 January 2022
- President: Arif Alvi
- Prime Minister: Imran Khan
- Minister: Sheikh Rasheed Ahmad

Ministry of Interior (Pakistan)
- In office 22 August 2018 – 22 July 2020
- President: Arif Alvi
- Prime Minister: Imran Khan

Personal details
- Born: 19 September 1975 (age 50) Islamabad, Pakistan
- Education: University of London(LLB), University of Newcastle (LLM)
- Occupation: Lawyer Politician

Mirza Shahzad Akbar is a Pakistani politician and barrister who served as Advisor to Prime Minister Imran Khan on Interior and Accountability in the capacity of a Federal Minister in Cabinet, in office from August 2020. Before his appointment as Advisor to Prime Minister, Akbar served in National Accountability Bureau (NAB) as a deputy prosecutor. Shahzad Akbar in January 2022 resigned as the PM's Advisor. Akbar is also known for his human rights work, particularly representing civilian victims of U.S. drone strikes in Pakistan.

Akbar's tenure in government focused on anti-corruption efforts, including leading the Assets Recovery Unit (ARU) to pursue cases of alleged money laundering and illicit financial flows. He was investigated by NAB post-2022 for alleged assets beyond means and involvement in financial settlements. Since leaving office, Akbar has resided in the United Kingdom, where he faced an acid attack in 2023 and initiated legal action against the Pakistani government. In December 2025, Pakistan requested his extradition from the UK amid ongoing probes.

== Early life and education ==
Mirza Shahzad Akbar was born on 19 September 1975 in Islamabad, Pakistan. He completed his graduation in Bachelor of Laws (LLB) from the University of London, Master of Laws (LLM) from the University of Newcastle. Akbar was called to the bar at Lincoln's Inn in London, qualifying as a barrister.

== Career ==
=== Legal career ===
Mirza Shahzad Akbar is co-founder of Foundation for Fundamental Rights, a non-governmental organization with focus on fundamental rights enshrined in Constitution of Pakistan. After serving as consultant for the U.S. Agency of International Development, he was declared persona non grata by United States once he became one of the leading attorneys in Pakistan who were dealing with litigations against drone strikes on civilians by United States in Federally Administrated Tribal Areas (FATA).

Akbar began his legal career as a special prosecutor for the National Accountability Bureau (NAB) from 2004 to 2008, handling high-profile corruption cases against political figures, including investigations involving Benazir Bhutto, Asif Ali Zardari, and Shehbaz Sharif.

=== Political career ===
==== Association with Pakistan Tehreek-e-Insaf ====
Akbar joined the Pakistan Tehreek-e-Insaf (PTI) as a legal advisor in the lead-up to the 2018 general election, contributing to the party's anti-corruption platform. On 20 August 2018, shortly after PTI's victory, Prime Minister Imran Khan appointed him Special Assistant to the Prime Minister on Accountability with the status of Minister of State. In this role, he oversaw NAB operations and established the Assets Recovery Unit (ARU) to recover looted funds from abroad, targeting cases of money laundering involving opposition leaders.

On 22 July 2020, Akbar was elevated to Advisor to the Prime Minister on Interior and Accountability, with federal minister rank, adding oversight of internal security matters. He played a key role in high-profile probes, including the sugar scam, oil import irregularities, and the £190 million settlement with the UK's National Crime Agency (NCA) involving Bahria Town. Akbar also filed complaints against PTI dissidents, such as an FIR against MPA Nazir Chauhan in 2021 for allegedly endangering his life through provocative statements.

==== Resignation ====
Akbar resigned as Advisor on 24 January 2022, citing a desire to focus on legal work while remaining affiliated with PTI. His departure followed criticism over unfulfilled promises to recover billions in looted assets and secure convictions in major cases. Following the ouster of the PTI government in April 2022 via a no-confidence vote, Akbar departed Pakistan for the UK via Dubai on 17 April 2022, after the Islamabad High Court suspended a travel ban imposed by the Federal Investigation Agency.

== Controversies and legal issues ==
=== NAB investigations ===
After the PTI government's fall, NAB initiated probes against Akbar, summoning him on 21 October 2022 for allegedly possessing assets beyond known means of income, including scrutiny of his role in the sugar scam, oil companies scam, and Rawalpindi Ring Road project. In August 2022, the federal cabinet placed him on the Exit Control List (ECL) at NAB's request over a financial scam.

In the Al-Qadir Trust case involving a £190 million NCA settlement, NAB accused Akbar of concealing information from the federal cabinet during a 2019 confidentiality deed approval, leading to arrest warrants in November 2023 and his declaration as a proclaimed offender in December 2023. Akbar has denied wrongdoing, filing petitions in the Islamabad High Court and Lahore High Court challenging NAB's procedures and a 2024 trial court order directing action against him for alleged false prosecution in a money laundering case. In February 2025, he offered to participate in NAB inquiries via video link from London, alleging political motivation and intimidation of his relatives.

In December 2023, police approached Interpol for a red notice in a fraud and extortion case registered at Secretariat police station, accusing Akbar of fabricating cases against his ex-wife's relatives.

=== Attacks and UK litigation ===
On 26 November 2023, Akbar was attacked with an "acidic liquid" outside his London residence, sustaining injuries to his arms and head but avoiding his eyes; his family was unharmed. He alleged state involvement, linking it to his brother's prior enforced disappearance in Pakistan. The Foreign Office rejected the claims as "preposterous". In April 2024, Akbar filed a legal notice in a UK court against the Pakistani government, naming officials as responsible for the attack and seeking damages for physical and psychological injuries. Following the incident, UK MP David Davis called on then Foreign Secretary David Cameron to summon Pakistan's high commissioner and suggested that Inter-Services Intelligence agency may have been involved, stating that he believed the available circumstantial evidence was "persuasive."

In July 2025, during a defamation case involving Adil Raja in the United Kingdom, where he was a witness, Shehzad said that when serving in government, he had regular contact with the Inter-Services Intelligence (ISI). Brigadier (retd) Rashid Naseer said Akbar had asked him to "speed up" cases against then opposition leader Shehbaz Sharif, so the latter could be sentenced, to which Naseer responded, saying it was not his responsibility. According to Akbar he had met Naseer to discuss alleged establishment interference in the judiciary and on alleged corruption by Sabir Mithu, after Naseer told him about corruption accusations regarding the Farah Gogi, the best friend of former first lady Bushra Bibi.

In December 2025, Akbar was assaulted at his home after answering the door to a man who asked to confirm his identity and then attacked him in front of his family, leaving him with a fractured nose and severe bruising. The assailant did not attempt to steal anything and fled the scene, prompting investigations by UK counterterrorism police due to its targeted nature.

=== Passport issues and extradition ===
Akbar's passport expired in early 2025 and was blocked by Pakistan's Interior Ministry and National Database and Registration Authority in 2023 at NAB's request over the Al-Qadir Trust case. The Pakistan High Commission in London refused renewal in October 2025, conditioning it on his return for NAB cooperation. On 4 December 2025, Interior Minister Mohsin Naqvi handed extradition papers for Akbar including Adil Raja to UK High Commissioner Jane Marriott, citing multiple pending cases. It was later revealed that his extradition along with Raja's was placed as a condition for Pakistan to accept the return of two other individuals who were tried for being associated with the Rochdale grooming gang.

== See also ==
- Adil Raja
