= Quota system in Pakistan =

Method of preserving regional representation

The Quota system in Pakistan was established to give every region of the country representation in institutions according to their population. The Quota System was first introduced in Pakistan in 1948. The Civil Service of Pakistan selects only 7.5% of the applicants by merit, education, qualification and experience. The quota system in Pakistan has some similarities with reservation in India.

== Background ==
=== 1948 ===
After Partition of Subcontinent, Between 1947 and 1958, Some of the most important government posts like the Prime ministership, the ministerial portfolios of Education, information and refugee rehabilitation and various provincial governorship were held by Punjabis. The first prime minister of Pakistan Liaquat Ali Khan, introduced the Quota system for the civil service in September 1948, in order to increase the number of Bengalis who were underrepresented though numerically a majority.

=== 1949 ===
Quota for recruitment into the Central Superior Services – 1949.
1. East Bengal (40.0%)
2. Punjab and Bahawalpur (23.0%)
3. Merit (20.0%)
4. Sindh, Balochistan, NWFP and tribal agencies (15.0%)
5. Karachi (2.00%)

The quota system was further refined in 1949 when 20 percent of seats were allocated for Central Superior Services (CSS) on merit, but the share of Sindh, Balochistan, NWFP and tribal agencies were further trimmed to 15 percent and the share of East Bengal and West Punjab, including Bahawalpur decreased by 2 and 1 percent respectively. The share of Karachi remains same.

=== 1956 ===
The Constitution of Pakistan of 1956 extended the quota system of 1949 by 15 years.

=== 1970 ===
General Yahya Khan’s martial law government extended the quota system according to which the rural and urban (Karachi, Hyderabad and Sukkur) population in Sindh was given 60% and 40% representation in services on the recommendations of the then martial law administrator Rukhman Gul of Sindh.

== University and college admission ==
There is quota system in Pakistan in admission to universities and colleges where a certain number of places are reserved a priori to applicants who have completed their pre-university studies in rural and undeveloped regions of the country. Candidates with low grades (marks or GPA) may qualify for admission to Medical college and Engineering college if they were from rural areas.

In 2014, a notification issued by Pakistan Medical and Dental Council (PMDC) created a storm of controversy among the medical students of Pakistan. According to notification, 2014-15 admissions would be held on quota system rather than open merit i.e. 50% seats in medical colleges of Pakistan were reserved for girls and 50% for boys. But there was silence on the side of University of Health Sciences, Lahore so students could not guess whether quota system would be applied from 2014 or next year. However, few days before the issuance of UHS's first merit list, the notification was challenged in Lahore High Court. On October 29, Lahore High Court took the decision that quota system was illegal, as it would be unfair for girls so 2014-15 admissions would be held on open merit.

== Civil Service ==
The Civil Service of Pakistan selects only 7.5% of the applicants by merit, education, qualification and experience while the 92.5% are selected by using quota system.

- Merit 7.5%
- Punjab (Including Federal Area of Islamabad) 50%
- Sindh 19%
  - The Share of Sindh will be further sub-allocated in the following ratio:
  - Urban Areas of the Sindh 40% of 19% or 7.6%.
  - Rural Areas of the Sindh 60% of 19% or 11.4%.
- Khyber Pakhtunkhwa 11.5%
- Balochistan 6%
- Federally Administered Tribal Areas 3% (will be merged with Khyber Pakhtunkhwa by 2030)
- Gilgit–Baltistan 1%
- Azad Kashmir 2%
- Women Reserved Quota: 10% Women quota will be observed / calculated from the share of each province / region

== Reserved political positions ==
Quotas in Pakistan were introduced in order to give equal opportunity for jobs, representation in assemblies and educational institutions to women, non-Muslims and people from under developed rural areas.

Provincial Assembly	General	Women	Non-Muslim	Total
Balochistan	51	11	3	65
Khyber-Pakhtunkhwa	99	22	3	124
Punjab	297	66	8	371
Sindh	130	29	9	168
Total	577	128	23	728

== Armed Forces ==
The Sind Regiment is an infantry regiment of the Pakistan Army established on 1 July 1980. Prior to this date there had been no regiment in the Pakistan Army specifically intended to recruit primarily from the Sindhi population. After 1989 the proportion of actual Sindhis in the Regiment was increased to over 50%. The Sindh Regimental Centre is located in Hyderabad, Sindh, Pakistan. The Infantry Regiments in Pakistan Army are known by the name of the province. Pakistan had Punjab Regiment, Baluch Regiment, Frontier Force Regiment and AK Regiment. This is just a symbolic representation. Sindh was the only province without a regiment to its name. Therefore, it may not be correct to say that the sole aim of establishing Sindh Regiment was to recruit Sindhi people in the army.

== Constitutional rights ==
The 1973 constitution of Pakistan clearly describes in Chapter I titled, “Fundamental Rights and Principles of Policy”, of Article 27 Clause I about safeguarding the fundamental rights of the citizens of Pakistan against the discrimination in the federal and provincial government services in these words:

The constitution gives equal rights:

- “No citizen otherwise qualified for appointment in the service of Pakistan shall be discriminated against in respect of any such appointment on the ground only of race, religion, caste, sex, residence or place of birth.”

The quota system limits the constitutional rights:

- “Provided that, for a period not exceeding twenty years from the commencing day, posts may be reserved for persons belonging to any class or area to secure their adequate representation in the service of Pakistan.”

== Criticism ==
The quota system has also been a Human Rights issue where a person with a regional, linguistic and rural/urban background is discriminated through quota system and denied public employment admission to colleges and universities.

Arsalan Iftikhar Chaudhry, son of former Chief Justice of Pakistan Iftikhar Muhammad Chaudhry, in spite of receiving a C grade (third division) in High School (Intermediate) was admitted to Bolan Medical College on the quota reserved for the Chief Minister of Balochistan. In Pakistan, medical college degree is awarded after five years but it took 7 years for Arsalan to graduate from medical college. Arsalan Iftikhar Chaudhry was a medical officer and within a month of graduation and then he was promoted as a section officer in the Department of Health of Government of Balochistan. Arsalan Iftikhar Chaudhry has never practiced medicine.

== See also ==
- Quota system of Bangladesh
- Reservation in India
