= Aik Din Geo Kay Sath =

Pakistani TV program

- Presented by: Suhail Warraich
- Country of origin: Pakistan
- Original language: Urdu
- No. of episodes: running

Production
- Running time: 20 minutes

Original release
- Network: Geo News
- Release: 2002 – present

Aik Din Geo Kay Sath is a Geo News television series, featuring interviews of politicians, film stars, musicians and athletes. It is hosted by Sohail Warraich.

== Guests ==
Numerous celebrities and prominent personalities from all fields have been guests on this show, including:

- Benazir Bhutto
- Khan Abdul Wali Khan
- Imran Khan
- Asif Ali Zardari
- Shehbaz Sharif
- Sheikh Rasheed Ahmed
- Asad Umar
- Fawad Chaudhry
- Altaf Hussain
- Yasin Malik
- Chaudhry Pervaiz Elahi
- Yusuf Raza Gillani
- Moin Qureshi, Maulana Abdul Aziz, Shahzad Roy, Akbar Bugti, Qazi Hussain Ahmed, Maulana Fazl-ur-Rehman, Ajmal Khattak, Zara Sheikh, Abrar-ul-Haq and Aamir Liaquat Hussain.

== Format ==
The host and team start the show in the morning by meeting the guest. They go with the subject to his or her workplace and home, meeting their friends and relatives who are also invited to comment about the main guest personality of the show. This TV show also shows footage of everyday activities
