= Iqbal Zuberi =

Pakistani journalist

- Born: Iqbal Zuberi; 1932; Bhopal
- Died: 3 September 2002 (aged 70)
- Occupations: Journalist, Editor
- Notable credit(s): former chief editor and chief executive of the Daily Mashriq
- Title: former chief editor and chief executive of the Daily Mashriq

Iqbal Zuberi was a senior Pakistani journalist and a former chief editor and chief executive of the Daily Mashriq. Iqbal Zuberi was born in Bhopal in 1932.

== Career ==
He began his journalistic career in 1951 with the Tameer daily in Rawalpindi. His last assignment was that of resident editor with the Business Recorder when it began publication its Lahore edition.

Iqbal Zuberi, who was author of two books on journalism, was vice president of the Council of Pakistan Newspaper Editors and member of the standing committee of All Pakistan Newspapers Society.

== Death ==
Iqbal Zuberi died in Karachi on Tuesday 3 September 2002 after protracted illness. He was 70.
