= Khurshid Nadeem =

Pakistani Urdu columnist and TV host

Khurshid Ahmed Nadeem
- خورشید احمد ندیم
- Occupations: Columnist; TV host
- Television: PTV: Geo TV

Khurshid Ahmed Nadeem is a Pakistani Urdu columnist, TV host, and author. He has been writing columns for different national newspapers like Daily Jang, Daily Express, Duniya News, and others.

== Career ==
Nadeem is a disciple of the religious scholar Javed Ahmed Ghamidi and most of his political analyses and social writings reflect a specific religious worldview. He has served as the editor of the academic journal Fikr-o-Nazar, which is published quarterly by the International Islamic University, Islamabad. He has also presented talk shows on PTV and Geo TV. Currently, he pens a weekly column “Takbeer e Musalsal” for the Urdu daily newspaper Duniya. He is also the chairman of Pakistan's National Rahmatul-lil-Alameen Wa Khatamun Nabiyyin Authority.

== Talk shows ==
- Alif on Geo TV
- Irteqa on PTV

== Books ==
- "Islam Aur Pakistan" (Islam and Pakistan), published by Al-Mawrid, Lahore in 1995 — An analysis of religious and secular politics of Pakistan
- "Islam Ka Tasawwur-e-Jurm-o-Saza" (Islamic Concept of Crime and Punishment), published by the International Institute of Islamic Thought, Islamabad in 1997
- "Ilm ki Islami Tashkeel" (Islamisation of knowledge), published by the Royal Book Company, Karachi
- "Islam, Civil Society and New Global Context" (bilingual), published by the Organisation for Research and Education (ORE), Islamabad in 2005
- "Beesveen Sadi ka Fahm e Islam" (The Understanding of Islam in 20th Century), published by Al-Mawrid, Lahore in 2008
- "Approaching conflicts: Muslim Society’s Perspective" (bilingual), published by the Organisation for Research and Education (ORE), Islamabad in 2010
- "Samaaj, Riasat Aur Mazhab: Mutabaadil Bayania" (Society, State, And Religion: An Alternate Narrative) — a collection of his weekly Urdu columns written during 2016 and 2017
