= Misri Khan Orakzai =

Pakistani journalist

- Born: ca. 1962; Pakistan
- Died: 14 September 2010; Hangu, Pakistan
- Cause of death: Gun shot
- Occupations: Journalist & owner
- Years active: Almost 30 years
- Employer: Misri Khan News Agency
- Organization: Hangu Union of Journalist
- Known for: President of Hangu Union of Journalist
- Spouse: Wife
- Children: 6 sons and 5 daughters

Misri Khan Orakzai (c. 1962 – 14 September 2010) was a journalist from Khyber Pakhtunkhwa province, Pakistan, who was assassinated by the outlawed terrorist group Tehrik-e Taliban. Orakzai worked for the Daily Ausaf and Daily Mashriq and was the president of the Hangu Union of Journalists, and was shot and killed at the press club in Hangu by the Tehrik-e Taliban terrorists, upset over his critical coverage.

== Personal ==
Misri Khan Orakzai was born in Pakistan in 1962. Orakzai was married and had six sons and five daughters.

== Career ==
Misri Khan Orakzai had been an Urdu-language journalist almost 30 years at the time of his murder. Early in his career, he worked for several different daily newspapers, such as Jinnah and Daily Ausaf in Islamabad and Daily Mashriq in Peshawar. Orakzai founded and ran the Misri Khan News Agency, the main news source in Hangu. Khan was president of the Hangu Union of Journalists in the Hangu district of Khyber Pakhtunkhwa.

== Death ==
Hangu, within Pakistan, is shown relative to the capital Islamabad.

Misri Khan Orakzai had been threatened before his murder, according to Orakzai's son Umer Farooq. Another son of his had been abducted on 1 March 2009. The fatal attack on Orakzai took place on 14 September 2010. One of Misri's sons said this after his father's death: "As far as we know, the incident is the result of his reporting."

Orakzai was outside the press club building of the Hangu Union of Journalists around 6:30 a.m. waiting for delivery of newspapers. Three unidentified men shot him at least four times and one of those bullets pierced his heart. He was taken to the District Headquarters Hospital in Hangu where he died. They said that he was receiving several death threats from terrorist groups because of what he had been reporting.

The terrorist group Tehreek-e-Taliban threatened Orakzai and other journalists and claimed responsibility for his murder for publishing negative stories about the Taliban. Ehsanullah Ehsan, a spokesman for the Taliban, contacted a journalist in Peshawar, the provincial capital, and said, "We killed him because he twisted the facts."

== Reactions ==
Irina Bokova, director-general of UNESCO, said, "I condemn the killing of Misri Khan Orakzai ... In carrying out their professional duties, they helped to uphold the basic right of freedom of expression. I call on the authorities in Pakistan to do their utmost to arrest the culprits of these crimes and bring them to justice."

President Asif Ali Zardari called Orakzai's murder a "heinous and despicable act of terrorism."

The Hangu Union of Journalists, Khyber Union of Journalists, Tribal Union of Journalists, and Pakistan Federal Union of Journalists all condemned the attack on Orakzai, demanded the authorities arrest the perpetrators, set a mourning period of three days and threatened protests if the government didn't take action. A demonstration was held to make their case.
