= Ansar Abbasi =

Pakistani commentator and columnist

Ansar Abbasi (Urdu: انصار عباسی) is a Pakistani right-wing commentator and columnist associated with The News International.

== Investigative articles ==
=== Chief Justice Choudhry ===
Abbasi was among the first to bring forth allegations against Chief Justice Iftikhar Choudhray for gross misconduct in 2002, accusing him of admitting his son Dr. Arsalan to the Federal Investigation Agency undermining all merits. Primarily based on this allegation the establishment moved a reference to Supreme Judicial Council against Chief Justice Iftikhar Choudhry.

=== President Musharraf ===
Abbasi has published work critical of the regime of former president Pervez Musharraf accusing him of building a multi-million rupees residence at Chak Shehzad, equipped with utilities at much cheaper rates with differential subsidized by the government.

=== Justice Dogar ===
"Our Special Daughters", an investigative report by Abbasi in Daily News, found out that Justice Dogar's daughter Farah Hameed Dogar's examination paper for F.Sc. was reassessed in violation of a previous Supreme Court ruling. While the results of 201 candidates were revised, only for her were the examination papers re-marked and the numbers increased. In the other 200 cases, only errors in adding the total marks were corrected. The case later went on to the parliamentary committee for education.

== See also ==
- List of Pakistani journalists
- Pakistan Federal Union of Journalists
