= Nasira Zuberi =

Nasira Zuberi is a Pakistani poet and a journalist.

== Early life and career ==
Nasira Zuberi comes from a literary family background, she got her early education from her home town, Lahore and received a master's degree in Economics from the University of Punjab. She started her career in 1988 as a reporter for Business Recorder, Pakistan's first business daily newspaper. She was later promoted to the position of senior reporter where she served until the late nineties. She covered news about the Pakistani parliament's upper and lower houses besides covering economic affairs. She published her first volume of poetry, Shagoon in the 1990s.

Nasira Zuberi shifted gears and went into electronic media in 1999. In the beginning, she produced and directed Business Review for Ptv World. Then in 2002, Jang Group of Publications started Geo TV. Nasira was part of the launching team of Geo TV and was soon promoted to the position of business editor.

When Recorder Television Network planned to launch Aaj TV; she was the one who was chosen to lead this venture. She served there as Controller News and Current Affairs and within a short period of time, enabled the newly created channel to be able to compete with the other top news channels. Under her guidance, this news channel's exclusive coverage of the Balochistan situation and 2005 Kashmir earthquake gained international acclaim.

Other Media moguls were also interested in the new field of electronic media. Pakistani Advertisement guru Taher A. Khan was also one of them. He shared his dream of his own news channel with Nasira and decided to embark on yet another venture. And within a short span of one year, Nasira made this dream a reality. In 2012, she is heading the team of News One (Pakistani TV channel) that has caught the viewers' attention right from its launching.

== Books ==
Nasira Zuberi launched her second book called "Kaanch Ka Chiragh" on 9 December 2012 – the ceremony was held at the Karachi Arts Council where many big names from the media were present.

In her book, Nasira Zuberi made comments on life by portraying it through a common human being's perspective. Her novel is basically a reflection of her life experience preserved in a very touching manner.

In May 2017, Nasira Zuberi launched another book of her poetry at Karachi Press Club titled 'Teesra Qadam' at an event that had many journalists attending the ceremony. Journalist Anwar Shaoor stated in his speech that noted Pakistani literary figures like Pirzada Qasim, Ahmed Nadeem Qasmi, Ahmed Faraz and Muhammad Ali Siddiqui had praised Nasira Zuberi's poetry.

== See also ==
- List of Pakistani journalists
