= Sabihuddin Ghausi =

Pakistani journalist

Sabihuddin Ghausi صبیح الدین غوثی
- Born: Sabihuddin Ghausi; 8 December 1943; Ahmedabad, Gujarat, British India
- Died: 26 March 2009 (aged 65); Karachi, Pakistan
- Occupation: Journalist

Sabihuddin Ghausi (Urdu: صبیح الدین غوثی) was a Pakistani journalist and activist.

== Early life ==
Ghausi was born in Ahmedabad, in Gujarat, British India. His father was a sessions judge at Junagadh High Court and also served as revenue commissioner in Manavadar. After the partition of India in 1947, the family migrated to Pakistan. Ghausi received his B.A. degree from Islamia College, Karachi and M.A. degree from the University of Karachi. He began his career as an officer at Habib Bank, but he resigned from the bank and joined journalism in 1970.

== Career ==
Ghausi started his journalistic career joining Daily Sun, his first newspaper job in 1970. He also worked for Pakistan Press International (PPI), Business Recorder, Morning News and Muslim newspapers. Later he joined the daily Dawn (newspaper) in 1988 and worked there for past two decades. He was elected four times as president of Karachi Press Club and two times as president of Karachi Branch of Pakistan Federal Union of Journalists.

Ghausi was jailed during Zia-ul-Haq’s military rule and lost his job. He still remained active and also took part in protests against the former military ruler Pervez Musharraf’s crackdown on the media.

Journalist Amir Zia wrote:

"He often painted a bleak and dismal picture of the state of affairs in Pakistan. His sense of loss of the disappearances of all the values dear to him – from social and individual liberties to freedom of expression, democracy and human rights – was great. Stories by Qurratulain Hyder, the poetry of Habib Jalib, tales of his favourite city Mumbai, the tragedy of Bangladesh, military rule in Pakistan and democratic system of government were some of Ghausi’s favourite and recurring topics."

== Death ==
He died in Karachi on 26 March 2009 at the age of 65.

== See also ==
- List of Pakistani journalists
