= Arsalan Iftikhar Chaudhry =

Pakistani businessman and medical doctor

- Born: 1976 (age 49–50); Quetta, Balochistan, Pakistan
- Education: Bolan Medical College
- Occupations: Medical doctor and business
- Parent: Iftikhar Muhammad Chaudhry

Arsalan Iftikhar Chaudhry (Urdu: ارسلان افتخار چودهرى; born 1976) is a Pakistani businessman and medical doctor. He is a son of the former Chief Justice of Pakistan Iftikhar Muhammad Chaudhry. He was notably involved in the Mediagate controversy in 2012.

== Selection using the Quota System ==
Arsalan Iftikhar Chaudhry, son of former Chief Justice of Pakistan Iftikhar Muhammad Chaudhry, in spite of receiving a C grade (third division) in High School (Intermediate) was admitted to Bolan Medical College on the quota reserved for the Chief Minister of Balochistan. Chaudhry was a medical officer within a month of graduation and was promoted as a section officer in the Department of Health of Government of Balochistan shortly thereafter. Arsalan Iftikhar Chaudhry has not yet decided to go on to practice medicine.

== Corruption charges ==
Malik Riaz Hussain, a real estate investor who founded and owns Bahria Town, was approached by an intermediary of Arsalan Iftikhar Chaudhry, son of Chief Justice Iftikhar Muhammad Chaudhry, that he had inside information of a case and it can be resolved in his favour. Malik Riaz Hussain in an official deposition produced itemised list of how he bankrolled a playboy lifestyle for the son of the country's top judge. Arsalan Iftikhar Chaudhry had allegedly promised to influence his father's rulings.

Arsalan Iftikhar Chaudhry, son of Chief Justice Iftikhar Muhammad Chaudhry, resigned on 3 July 2014 from his post as Vice Chairman of Balochistan Board of Investment. The appointment was being criticized heavily by the media and opposition parties. His appointment was also being linked to the alleged role of the former Chief Justice of Pakistan, Iftikhar Muhammad Chaudhry, in the alleged rigging of General Elections 2013.

Arsalan Iftikhar had accused Imran Khan saying that he was hiding certain information about himself to contest General Election 2013; therefore, his credibility as member of national assembly was doubtful.

== See also ==
- Balochistan Board of Investment
- Malik Riaz Hussain
- Imran Khan
