= Zia Ur Rehman =

Zia Ur Rehman (Urdu, Pashto,: ضیاءالرحمن, born 1981) is a Pakistani journalist, researcher, and author, specialising in security issues, human rights, minorities, and politics.

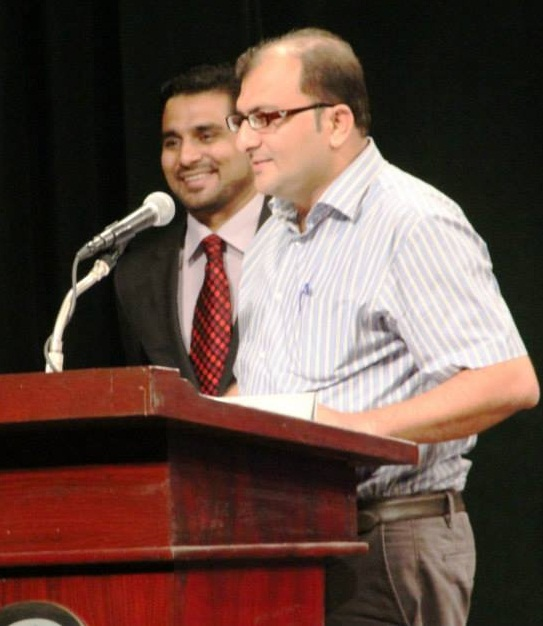
Zia Ur Rehman at the Agahi Awards

== Personal life ==
Rehman was born and raised in Karachi, the capital of Sindh province. He received his master's degree from University of Karachi in 2005. In 2018, he completed the prestigious British Chevening Scholarship South Asian Journalism fellowship. He speaks Urdu, English, Pashto, and Balochi languages.

== Work ==
Rehman currently works as a senior reporter with the English daily The News International in Karachi and regularly writes to the New York Times. He has also been published in The National, TRT World, The Friday Times, Dawn and Herald, among other publications. Rehman mainly covers security, political and human rights issues, migration, and labour rights, and monitors and specialises in Islamist and ethnic movements in the region. He has been widely quoted in international and national publications, such as The Washington Post, Reuters, AFP, and Radio Free Europe Free Liberty.

Rehman has also offered training in conflict reporting to journalists and also trained a number of Karachi youth from underprivileged and underreported areas of Karachi to teach them reporting and news-writing as well as photo and video journalism.

== Publications ==
Rehman authored a book titled Karachi in Turmoil, in February 2013., containing a detailed coverage of the ethnic violence in Karachi. Taliban phenomenon is also discussed in detail. He also contributed a chapter on Pashtuns in Karachi in the book 'Cityscapes of Violence in Karachi: Publics and Counterpublics’ published in 2017 by the C. Hurst & Co. In his chapter, Rehman highlights multiple pressures experienced by the politics of the Pashtun community in Karachi. According to a book review published in Herald (Pakistan) magazine, one of the interesting features in his very cogent analysis is how the jihadi groups in Karachi appropriated criminal methods of extortion in order to raise funds and in doing so ended up harassing their own core ethnic group — Pakhtuns, specifically wealthy transporters and businessmen in the community.

Rehman has also written research reports and articles for several national and international publications and journals, including the Terrorism Monitor of the Jamestown Foundation, CTC Sentinel, a publication of the Combating Terrorism Center and Norwegian Peacebuilding Resource Center.

== Awards and fellowships ==
Rehman won four Agahi Journalism Awards in 2013 for his reports on minorities and security issues. In February 2021, the Global Initiative Against Transnational Organized Crime, has chosen Rehman for 2021 Resilience Fellowship with aim to help uncover the impact of extortion in Pakistan.
