= Case No. 9 =

2025 Pakistani television series

- Genre: Crime; Thriller; Social
- Showrunners: Abdullah Kadwani; Asad Qureshi
- Written by: Shahzeb Khanzada
- Screenplay by: Shebzeb Khanzada
- Directed by: Syed Wajahat Hussain
- Starring: Saba Qamar; Faysal Quraishi; Junaid Khan; Aamina Sheikh; Naveen Waqar
- Country of origin: Pakistan
- Original language: Urdu
- No. of seasons: 1
- No. of episodes: 32

Production
- Producers: Abdullah Kadwani; Asad Qureshi
- Production locations: Karachi, Pakstan
- Camera setup: Multi-camera setup
- Running time: 35 minutes
- Production company: 7th Sky Entertainment

Original release
- Network: Geo Entertainment
- Release: 24 September 2025 – 8 January 2026

Case No. 9 is a 2025 Pakistan crime thriller television series, written by Shahzeb Khanzada, and directed by Syed Wajahat Hussain. It starts Saba Qamar as a rape survivor and entails her journey to get justice against her preparator. Faysal Quraishi, Junaid Khan, Aamina Sheikh and Naveen Waqar featured in pivotal roles. It premiered on Geo Entertainment on 24 September 2025.

The story follows Sehar, an ambitious young woman who is raped by her wealthy and influential boss, Kamran. Despite her family's attempts to conceal the incident, she escapes home and reports the crime to the police, setting the stage for a legal battle for justice.

== Plot ==
Kamran, a powerful businessman, lures his employee Sehar Moazzam to his house under false pretences, where a horrific incident changes her life forever. Despite her fear, Sehar takes legal action against Kamran, but his wealth and influence begin to work in his favour. Manisha is shocked by Rohit's revelations, while Kamran uses his money and influence to manipulate the case against Sehar. Sehar's determination is tested when Inspector Shafiq uses diplomatic tactics to discourage her from pursuing the case against Kamran. Later, her fight for justice suffers another setback. Kiran discovers Kamran's crime against Sehar, but Rohit's false testimony turns the truth into a lie. Sehar bravely records her statement against Kamran, while the conflict between Rohit and Manisha over their loyalties threatens their relationship. The trial between Sehar and Kamran begins. With guidance from her lawyer Beenish, Sehar seeks justice, while Kamran prepares to defend himself with Bukhari's support. Sehar faces Bukhari's harsh cross-examination and indirect taunts in court. Meanwhile, Kiran confronts Kamran and Rohit after witnessing Manisha's support for Sehar. Kamran finally tells Kiran what happened that night, but presents a distorted version of the events to suit his own narrative. Someone from Sehar's past arrives at her doorstep, while Kiran continues to question Kamran's innocence. Beenish and Bukhari get into an argument in the judge's chambers, while Manisha grows frustrated with Rohit's continued loyalty to Kamran. Kamran launches a social media propaganda campaign against Sehar in an attempt to restore his reputation and weaken her case. Bukhari questions Sehar's family, putting them under pressure in an attempt to turn the case in Kamran's favour. Manisha continues trying to persuade Rohit to support Sehar. Meanwhile, Inspector Shafiq appears in court and gives testimony in Kamran's favour. Beenish strongly challenges Kamran's employee and witness, Mureed, during his testimony. She then directly confronts Kamran with a bold challenge. Overconfident and driven by his ego, Kamran decides to give his statement on oath despite Bukhari's concerns. Beenish takes advantage of the opportunity to strengthen Sehar's case. Beenish presents a powerful argument in court, leaving Bukhari and Kamran unsettled, while Sehar regains hope in her pursuit of justice. Following the courtroom developments, Kiran leaves Kamran and his house. Meanwhile, tensions rise between Manisha and Rohit over their loyalties and decisions. Kamran devises a dangerous plan against Sehar with Shafiq's assistance, but Ali intervenes at the right moment and saves her. During his investigation, Kamran uncovers the truth about Ali. Meanwhile, Beenish's strong arguments in court lead the judge to summon Rohit as a witness. Following Beenish's strong arguments, the court calls Inspector Shafiq to testify, much to Bukhari's frustration. Meanwhile, Kamran attempts to reconcile with Manisha. Kamran uses social media to damage Sehar's reputation, but his plan backfires when Sehar decides to take matters into her own hands. Rohit makes one final attempt to save Kamran, but his efforts backfire. Manisha walks out, leaving Rohit facing a life-changing decision. Rohit appears in court to give his testimony, delivering a statement that significantly influences the direction of the case. Following Rohit's testimony, Kiran becomes increasingly doubtful of Kamran's honesty. Bukhari begins preparing a new strategy to counter Rohit's statement. Bukhari retaliates by portraying Rohit and Manisha as Sehar's co-conspirators. Meanwhile, Kiran obtains crucial evidence. Kiran realises her mistake and cuts ties with Kamran. Meanwhile, Kamran meets SP Zohaib in an attempt to influence the investigation. Kamran appears in a media interview and speaks against Sehar, influencing public opinion in his favour and leaving her deeply distressed. Encouraged to respond to Kamran's interview, Sehar appears on renowned anchor Shahzeb Khanzada's show. However, the interview gets off to a difficult start. Sehar regains her composure and continues the interview. Meanwhile, Kamran becomes agitated when Kiran refuses to support him and makes a bold decision. Kamran and Sehar face each other in a heated interview on Shahzeb Khanzada's show, while Kiran presents crucial evidence against Kamran. After a prolonged struggle, Sehar finally wins her case against Kamran, and those involved in supporting him are also sentenced.

== Cast ==
- Saba Qamar as Sehar Moazzam
- Faysal Quraishi as Kamran Haider
- Junaid Khan as Rohit Bhagwant
- Aamina Sheikh as Beenish: Sehar's lawyer
- Naveen Waqar as Manisha Rohit; Women's right activist, Rohit's wife
- Gohar Rasheed as Inspector Shafiq
- Ali Rehman Khan as Ali
- Rushna Khan as Kiran
- Kamran Jeelani as Zohaib
- Hina Khawaja Bayat as Shaheena
- Noor ul Hassan as Bukhari
- Mizna Waqas as Shazia
- Madiha Rizvi as Dr. Shehnaz

== Production ==
The series marked Aamina Sheikh's return to television and her second collaboration with Saba Qamar after Maat (2011-12).

== Reception ==
Muna Khan of Dawn praised the series for tackling topics like rape and its aftermath, the issues of victim-blaming, the misuse of power and portraying the challenges faced by survivors in Pakistani society. Gaitee Ara Siddiqi of The Friday Times praised the series for its bold and impactful portrayal of sensitive topics, and also commended the cast performances, including Saba Qamar, Faysal Quraishi, and Aamina Sheikh. Mehmal Sarfraz of The Telegraph India praised the series for its gripping portrayal of a rape survivor's ordeal and the challenges she faces in seeking justice, and the acting of Quraishi and Qamar. Afreen Seher of the DAWN Images praised the series for its portrayal of strong, complex female characters who drive the narrative with agency and professionalism, and also their portrayal by the actresses who are in their forties while playing their real ages on screen.

== Awards and nominations ==
Year	Award	Category	Recipient(s) / Nominee(s)	Result	Ref(s)
2026	3rd Sunday Special Icon Awards	Best Play Of The Year	Case No. 9	Nominated	
2026	3rd Sunday Special Icon Awards	Most Impactful Social Drama Of The Year	Case No. 9	Nominated	
2026	3rd Sunday Special Icon Awards	Best Drama Producer Of The Year	7th Sky Entertainment	Nominated	
2026	3rd Sunday Special Icon Awards	Best Drama Writer Of The Year	Shahzeb Khanzada	Nominated	
2026	3rd Sunday Special Icon Awards	Best Director Of The Year	Syed Wajahat Hussain	Nominated	
2026	3rd Sunday Special Icon Awards	Best Actor Of The Year - Female	Saba Qamar	Nominated	
2026	3rd Sunday Special Icon Awards	Best Supporting Male Of The Year	Junaid Khan	Nominated	
2026	3rd Sunday Special Icon Awards	Best Supporting Female Of The Year	Aamina Sheikh	Nominated	
2026	3rd Sunday Special Icon Awards	Best Comeback Award Of The Year	Aamina Sheikh	Nominated	
2026	3rd Sunday Special Icon Awards	Best Actor Male Negative Role Of The Year	Faysal Quraishi	Nominated	
2026	3rd Sunday Special Icon Awards	Best Actor Male Negative Role Of The Year	Gohar Rasheed	Nominated	

== Sequel ==
A follow-up instalment titled Case No. 10 was announced in January 2026. Writer Khanzada confirmed that he had completed the script and described the project as a murder mystery. He also stated that the response to Case No. 9 had encouraged him to develop another story.

In November 2026, Saba Qamar shared behind-the-scenes photographs from the production with television host Tabish Hashmi. The project is directed by Danish Nawaz, with Khanzada returning as writer. The series is expected to be broadcast in January 2027.
