= Saneeya Hussain =

Pakistani journalist (1954–2005)

Saneeya Hussain (13 August 1954 – 20 April 2005) was a Pakistani journalist and environmentalist. She married a Brazilian man in 1998 and died in Brazil in 2005.

== Biography ==
Saneeya began her career at MNJ Pakistan working for Javed Jabbar as a copywriter in 1978. In the mid-eighties, Saneeya edited The Star Weekend magazine. The paper was a platform for dissenting views. Banned columnists had to keep changing their names to continue writing, and the women’s movement that was so alive in those days found plenty of space in the magazines pages. She was also a member of the Shirkat Gah Collective which catalyzed the Women’s Action Forum, the lobby group that so fiercely resisted the Zia regime. When “the red scribbles from upstairs” got unbearable, in early 1988, she left.

Saneeya moved on to join the World Conservation Union (IUCN) – and was also one of the first Pakistanis to participate in people-to-people contact with Indian environmentalists. She also set up the pioneering Journalists Resource Centre that trained and encouraged journalists in environmental reporting.

Saneeyas involvement in the Pakistan's National Conservation Strategy (NCS) drafted at that time included the path-breaking NCS Bulletin (later The Way Ahead magazine), and its Urdu counterpart, Jareeda, edited by Obaidullah Baig.

== See also ==
- List of Pakistani journalists
