= Mehdi Hasan (Pakistani journalist) =

Pakistani journalist and academic (1937–2022)

- Born: 27 June 1937; Panipat, British India (Present-day, Panipat, Haryana in India)
- Died: 23 February 2022 (aged 84); Lahore, Pakistan
- Education: University of the Punjab; University of Colorado Boulder
- Occupations: Journalist, Academian
- Spouse: Rukhsana Hasan
- Relatives: Mubashir Hassan (cousin)
- Awards: Sitara-i-Imtiaz (Star of Excellence) Award by the President of Pakistan in 2012

Mehdi Hasan (Urdu: مہدی حسن, 27 June 1937 – 23 February 2022), SI was a Pakistani left-wing journalist, media historian, and academic. He was one of Pakistan's most prominent communication experts, with a specialization in political analysis.

== Early life and education ==
Hasan was born on 27 June 1937 in Panipat, British India. His family migrated to Pakistan in 1947 and settled in Sahiwal. Hasan did Master in Journalism and PhD in mass communication from the University of the Punjab on Role of Press in Formation of Public Opinion 1857–1947. He won a Fulbright Scholar (1990) at the University of Colorado Boulder, where he conducted research on "Coverage of Third World Countries in the American Mass Media".

== Career ==
Hasan joined the faculty of mass communication at the University of the Punjab in 1967. After retirement, he joined Beaconhouse National University, served as Dean of School of Media and Communication.

Hasan was a frequent commentator and panellist on television and radio stations, where he brought his academic research into social context. He wrote extensively on the subject of Pakistan's history, journalism, mass communication and political parties, but his book The Political history of Pakistan is a widely used reference by journalists. His long-held personal view was that distortion of facts by news media is distorting our history.

From 1961 to 1967, Hasan's journalism career progressed from sub-editor, reporter, to news bureau chief at Pakistan Press International (PPI) news agency. During this time, he was elected office-bearer of Pakistan Federal Union of Journalists (PFUJ) five times. Hasan also had been a news commentator and analyst for Pakistani television since 1964, and for Radio Pakistan since 1962, including for Voice of America, BBC News, Deutsche Welle, Reuters, and Associated Press, and a contributor to all major newspapers in Pakistan and a columnist at English daily The News International and at Urdu language newspaper Daily Waqt.

A long-time member and twice elected chairperson of the Human Rights Commission of Pakistan, Hasan wrote many papers, and participated in multiple seminars. In 2015, addressing a public event at University of Gujrat, Pakistan, Hasan emphasized the urgent need to promote honest and impartial reporting and said that bad journalism is distorting the history of Pakistan. He said all citizens of Pakistan have equal rights under the law regardless of their religions.

His hobbies and passion included photography and he possessed 35mm cameras, including a couple of Rolleiflex cameras. His passion for photography took him to the frontline of the Lahore war zone in 1965, although he was not a professional photographer.

== Personal life and death ==
Hasan died after a protracted illness on 23 February 2022 in Lahore. He was survived by his wife, Rukhsana Hasan, and two sons.

== Awards and recognition ==
In 2012, he received the Sitara-i-Imtiaz Award from the President of Pakistan for his services in the field of literature and journalism.

== See also ==
- List of Pakistani journalists
- Pakistan Federal Union of Journalists
