= Meher Bukhari =

Pakistani journalist (born 1984)

- Born: 29 February 1984 (age 42)
- Occupations: TV News anchor, Journalist
- Employer(s): Dunya News (2012, 2024-present); Dawn News (2016-2021) / Hum News (2021); ARY News (2023-2024)
- Known for: Known for her bold and focused style of questioning as a journalist
- Spouse: Kashif Abbasi

Meher Bukhari (Urdu: مہر بخاری) is Pakistani television anchorperson and host. After a controversial stint at Dunya News in 2012 and Dawn News (2013), Bokhari is currently associated with ARY News since May 2023.

== Early education and career ==
Meher Bukhari started her career as a journalist and a host on TV news programs for SAMAA TV. She had a stint with Dunya News after departing from Dunya News, she joined Dawn News in 2013 as a talkshow anchorperson where she hosted her show NewsEye. In February 2021, she left Dawn News and joined Hum News. Bukhari was born in 1984 and during her early years, raised in Pakistan. She went abroad in pursuit of higher education, but later returned to pursue her professional career in Pakistan.

== Scandals ==
=== 2012 Interview Scandal ===
On 13 June 2012, Bukhari and co-host Mubashir Lucman on Dunya News, interviewed Malik Riaz, Pakistani property tycoon and owner of the Bahria Town Group, who had made a string of corruption accusations against Arsalan Iftikhar, son of the then Chief Justice of Pakistan Iftikhar Muhammad Chaudhry. One day after the interview aired, a recording of supposedly off-air conversations between Bukhari, Lucman, and Riaz during scheduled breaks of the interview surfaced on YouTube. The nature of the conversation and comments gave credence to the assertion that the entire interview was staged to benefit Malik Riaz by asking guided questions to give Riaz the opportunity to malign the then Chief Justice.

== See also ==
- SAMAA TV
- Dunya News
