= Quetta: A City of Forgotten Dreams =

- Directed by: Murtaza Chaudary
- Written by: Faysal Chaudary
- Produced by: Faysal Chaudary & Sana Bucha
- Starring: Asal Din Khan, Abdullah Ghaznavi, Ali Karimi, Fayaz Hussain, Danyal Ali
- Production companies: Filmsaaz, Sana Bucha Productions
- Country: Pakistan
- Language: Urdu

Quetta: A City of Forgotten Dreams is an unreleased Pakistani drama film directed by Murtaza Chaudary, written by Faysal Chaudary and co-produced by Faysal Chaudary, Sana Bucha under the Production banner Filmsaaz, Sana Bucha Productions. The film star Asal Din Khan, Abdullah Ghaznavi, Ali Karimi, Fayaz Hussain and Danyal Ali in lead roles.

== Plot ==
The film's story resolves around the lives of the people living in the city of Quetta.

== Cast ==
- Asal Din Khan
- Abdullah Ghaznavi
- Ali Karimi
- Fayaz Hussain
- Danyal Ali
