= Abdul Hameed Chapra =

Pakistani journalist and activist (died 2020)

Abdul Hameed Chapra عبدالحمید چھاپرا
- Born: Abdul Hameed Chapra
- Died: 22 December 2020
- Occupations: Journalist, Social activist, Union activist
- Known for: His struggle against military regimes in Pakistan

Abdul Hameed Chapra (Urdu: عبدالحمید چھاپرا) was a Pakistani journalist and a Union activist who was a former president of Karachi Press Club.

He died on 23 December 2020 in Karachi.

He always had raised and defended the rights of the workers and hawkers of the newspapers and struggled for the freedom of the press and for the rights of working journalists.

== Early life and career ==
Chapra was elected five times president of the Karachi Press Club from 1980 to 1985. He was also president of the Pakistan Federal Union of Journalists (PFUJ) and fought against military regimes for the freedom of the media and democracy in Pakistan.

He was jailed during the 1978 movement for freedom of the press during General Zia ul Haq's regime.

== Death ==
Abdul Hameed Chapra died on 22 December 2020 after a brief illness. Among his survivors are his wife, three daughters and a son.

== See also ==
- List of Pakistani journalists
