= Aaj Shahzeb Khanzada Kay Sath =

Pakistani current affairs television show

- Also known as: Shahzeb Khanzada Show
- Genre: Current affairs Talk show
- Written by: Wajid Baloch
- Presented by: Shahzeb Khanzada
- Country of origin: Pakistan
- Original language: Urdu
- No. of episodes: 3000+ (list of episodes)

Production
- Executive producer: Shahbaz Zahid
- Producers: Zubair Hussain; Adnan Raza; Danish Nazir Hussain; Masood Ansari; Sana Dawood; Ghulam Abbas
- Production locations: Karachi, Sindh, Pakistan
- Editor: Noor ul Ain
- Running time: 40 minutes

Original release
- Network: Geo News
- Release: 2015 – present

Related
- Aaj Kamran Khan Kay Sath

Aaj Shahzeb Khanzada Kay Sath (previously Aaj Kamran Khan Kay Sath) is a Pakistani television late night current affairs talk show broadcasting on Geo News every Monday to Friday at 10 PM, PKT. The show is currently hosted by Shahzeb Khanzada. Previously, it was hosted by Kamran Khan, directed by Junaid Mumtaz and produced by Asmat Mallick. Shahzeb Khanzada received Best Anchorperson Award for 2013, in a ceremony organized by the Pakistan Media Award.

== History ==
First launched as Aaj Kamran Khan Ke Saath, the show discusses the major stories of the day with the anchor's analysis and often adds the views of famous journalists, anchors and political figures of Pakistan. The show updates the viewers with daily current affairs and facts behind the issues it covers. On 24 July 2014, Geo news broadcast the last episode of Aaj Kamran Khan Ke Sath, and the show was renamed as Aaj Shahzeb Khanzada Kay Sath.
