= Aaj Kamran Khan Kay Sath =

- Also known as: Kamran Khan Show
- Genre: Current affairs Talk show
- Directed by: Junaid Mumtaz
- Presented by: Kamran Khan
- Country of origin: Pakistan
- Original language: Urdu
- No. of episodes: 3000

Production
- Producers: Irfan Ishaque, Asmat Mallick, Shahbaz Zahid
- Production location: Karachi
- Editor: Zubair Hussain
- Running time: 40 minutes

Original release
- Network: Geo News
- Release: 2002 – 24 July 2014

Related
- Aaj Shahzeb Khanzada Kay Sath

Aaj Kamran Khan Kay Sath (previously Kamran Khan Show) was a Pakistani television current affairs talk show that aired on weekdays on Geo News. The show was hosted by Kamran Khan, directed by Junaid Mumtaz, and produced by Asmat Mallick.

== History ==
Aaj Kamran Khan Kay Sath focused on major stories of the day, with the host adding his analysis of the topics as well as soliciting the views of famous journalists, anchors, and political figures in Pakistan. Each episode of the show updated its viewers on current affairs and other subjects of the day. After some time, Kamran Khan left the show. On 24 July 2014, Geo news broadcast the last episode of Aaj Kamran Khan Kay Sath and the show was renamed as Aaj Shahzeb Khanzada Kay Sath. It has since been hosted by Shahzeb Khanzada.
