= Tahir Hanfi =

Pakistani poet

Muhammad Masood Tahir Hanfi
- محمد مسعود طاہر حنفی
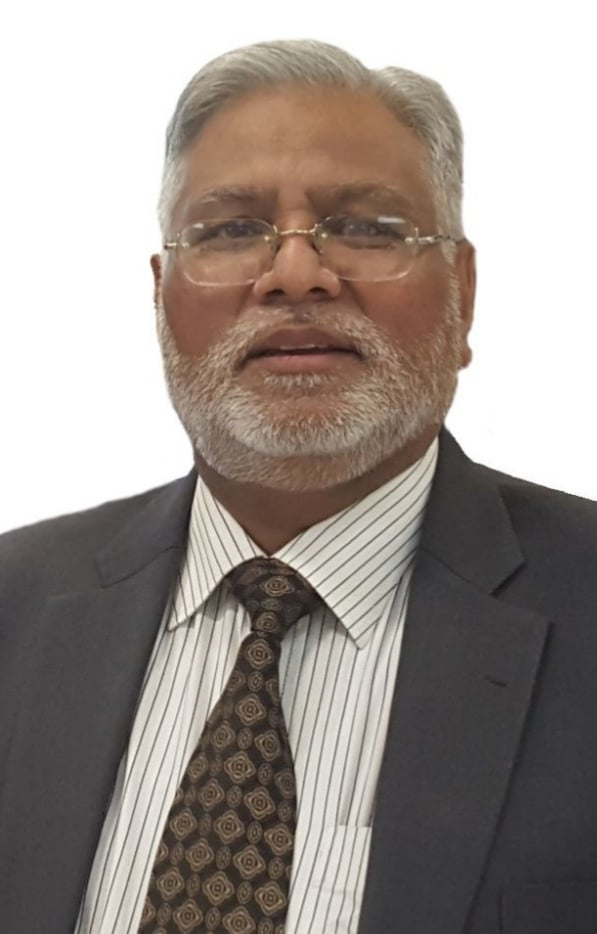
- Born: 26 November 1955 (age 70); Rawalpindi, Punjab, Pakistan
- Education: National Defence University (M.Sc.), University of the Punjab (M.A.)
- Occupations: Poet, Former civil servant, Parliamentary development consultant
- Years active: 1972–present
- Spouse: Rehana Tahir (1957–2013)
- Father: Haji Shafi Muhammad Hanfi

Muhammad Masood Tahir Hanfi (Urdu: محمد مسعود طاہر حنفی) is a Pakistani poet, journalist, and former civil servant based in Islamabad, Pakistan. He is a former deputy secretary general of the Parliament of Pakistan and additional secretary of the committee responsible for technical and administrative support to the National Assembly of Pakistan. Currently, he is a consultant for parliamentary development and an international advisor on capacity-building initiatives. He is the founder and honorary CEO of Digital Democracy Radar, an Islamabad-based watchdog on parliamentary functioning, democracy, and constitutional affairs.

== Life and professional career ==
Tahir Hanfi was born on 26 November 1955 in Rawalpindi, Pakistan. He received his master's degree in Defence and Strategic Studies from the National Defence University, Islamabad (2007) and his M.A. in political science from the University of the Punjab, Lahore (1981). He successfully completed the 44-week National Defence Course (NDC) from National Defence University Islamabad (2007) and a 12-week Executive Course in Security Studies in 2004 from Asia Pacific Centre for Security Studies (APCSS), Honolulu, Hawaii, US. He was also awarded a prestigiousChevening fellowship in 2008, funded by the UK FCO, in "Democracy, Rule of Law and Security" at the Centre for Studies in Security and Diplomacy (CSSD) University of Birmingham, UK.

In the service of the National Assembly of Pakistan since 1983, Mr Hanfi has served as Additional Secretary in charge of three wings of the National Assembly, namely Public Accounts Committee (2013 – 2014), Library and Research (2013 – 2015) and Committees (2015). He was also Director General of the Library & Research (2004 – 2013), Joint Secretary of the Public Accounts Committee (2009 – 2010), Director and deputy director of Inter-Parliamentary Affairs Division (1990 – 2004) and Research Officer in Research and Reference Directorate (1983 – 1989). He was Secretary to a Special Parliamentary Committee on the services of Members of Parliament (MP's) and of the Standing Committee on the Environment (2004 – 2006) and Head of the Protocol Department of National Legislature (1994 – 2000).

From 1974 to 1983, he worked as a journalist for renowned news agencies such as Pakistan Press International (PPI), Daily Jang, and Daily Nawaiwaqt.

Hanfi regularly appears on YouTube talkshows, television and radio programmes dealing with constitutional and parliamentary affairs. He is also a well-known poet.

Hanfi regularly appears on YouTube talk shows, television programmes and radio programmes dealing with constitutional and parliamentary affairs. He is also a well-known poet.

== Professional achievements ==
Hanfi led a team that assisted the 24-member Parliamentary Committee on Constitutional Reforms (PCCR) with research, references and documentation from June 2009 to March 2010. The PCCR unanimously approved the seminal eighteenth amendment to the Constitution of Pakistan, a landmark in Pakistan's constitutional history that restores the Constitution to its original form and granting autonomy to the provinces.

In 2009, he was appointed as Joint Secretary of the Public Accounts Committee (PAC) to provide technical support to the Parliamentary oversight mechanism. During his tenure, for the first time in one year (2010), PAC prepared three annual reports of the Pakistan PAC, which were subsequently tabled in the National Assembly of Pakistan for discussion and approval by the House.

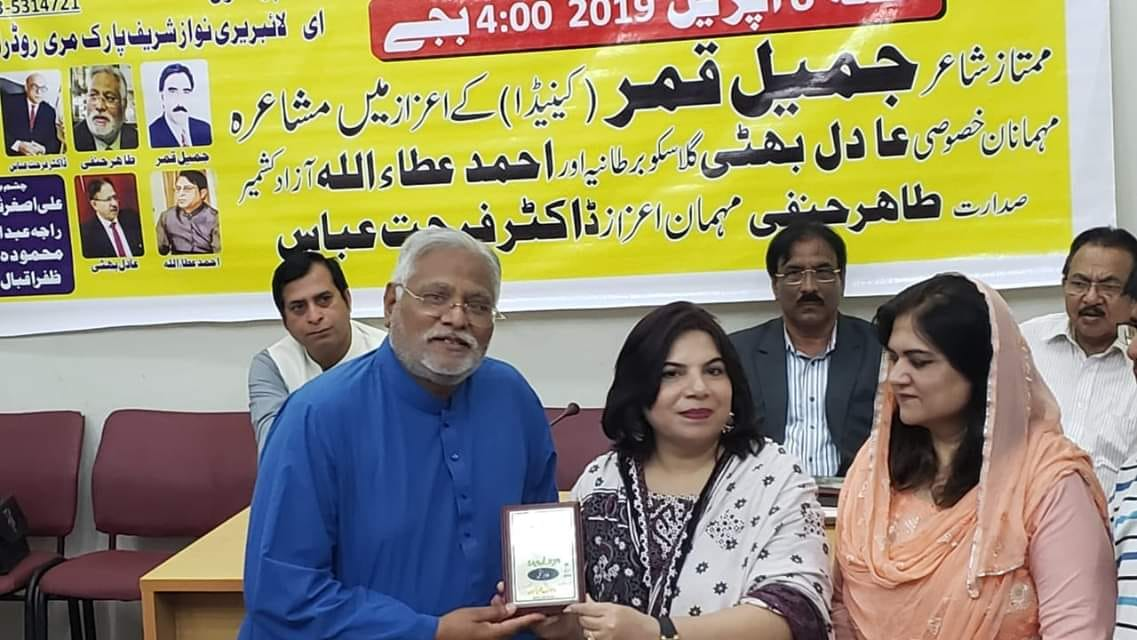
Tahir Hanfi receiving the Ahmed Shuja Award from Ms Bushra Hazeen, a former member (2002–2007) of the National Assembly of Pakistan, on 06 April 2019

He was appointed by the Speaker of the House in March 2009 as a member of the Multiparty Strategic Planning Committee (MSPC) of the National Assembly of Pakistan, which was responsible for preparing the first-ever three-year strategic plan for the National Assembly. Mr Hanfi has served the United States Congress and the American State Legislatures of Wisconsin and California and had the honour of working with the Grand National Assembly of Turkey, the Parliament of the United Kingdom, the Parliament of Canada, the National Diet of Japan and the Parliament of Australia on a short and long-term basis between 1987 and 2005.

As the focal person for the USAID funded Pakistan Legislative Strengthening Program (PLSP) project in the National Assembly of Pakistan, he was instrumental in establishing the Pakistan Parliament's main research and service institution, the Pakistan Institute for Parliamentary Services (PIPS). He is currently a guest lecturer at PIPS.

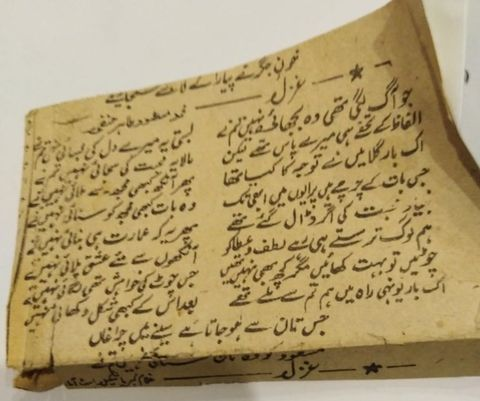
First Urdu Ghazal of Tahir Hanfi published in Daily Tameer Rawalpindi, on 13 May 1972

As a focal person, Mr Hanfi oversaw the implementation of foreign assistance programmes in the National Assembly of Pakistan, including the United Nations Development Program and Inter-Parliamentary Union's (2004–09) Strengthening Democracy through Parliamentary Development Project (PLSP) (2004 – 08), and the USAID-funded Pakistan Legislative Strengthening Programme (PLSP) (2004–08), which focused on building the capacity of the legislature.

== Contributions as poet ==
Hanfi has published five collections of poetry, latest one in January 2022. The first edition of his first collection of poetry, Shehr-e-Narasa (Urdu: شہر نارسا) was published in April 2014, while the second edition was published two months later in June 2014. Celebrations for the publication of Shehr-e-Narasa were held in 22 cities across Pakistan, the United Kingdom and the United States. The second poetry collection, Goongi Hijrat (Urdu: گونگی ہجرت) was published in September 2019, which was well received in literary circles in Pakistan and five US states – Maryland, New Jersey, New York, Texas, and the capital Washington DC.

The third and fourth collections of his poetry, Khana Badoosh Ankhain (Urdu: خانہ بدوش آنکھیں) and Yarghamal-e-Khak (Urdu: یرغمال خاک) have recently been published and have been highly praised by the distinguished poetic community.

Mr Hanfi's fifth poetry collection, RashkeAflaak (Urdu: رشک افلاک), coincides with Pakistan's 75th birth anniversary. The fifth collection, published in January 2022, includes 75 couplets and 75 ghazals. Asadullah Ghalib, a well-known columnist, wrote an article analyzing key stanzas from RashkeAflaak.

Mr Hanfi's sixth poetry collection, Awaaz-e-Gumshuda (Urdu: آواز گم شدہ), is published in January 2023.

== Poetry collections ==
- Awaaz-e-Gumshuda (Urdu: آواز گم شدہ) – 2023
- Rashk-e-Aflaaq (Urdu: رشک افلاک) – 2022
- Yarghamal-e-Khak (Urdu: یرغمال خاک) – 2021
- Khana Badoosh Ankhain (Urdu: خانہ بدوش آنکھیں) – 2020
- Goongi Hijrat (Urdu: گونگی ہجرت) – 2019
- Shehr-e-Narasa (Urdu: شہر نارسا) – 2014

== Other contributions ==
Hanfi has contributed to two international publications.

- The Crime of Aggression in International Criminal Law: Historical Development, Comparative Analysis and Present State
- The Compatibility of the Rome Statute's Draft Definition of the Crime of Aggression with National Criminal Justice Systems

== International travel ==
Hanfi has travelled extensively to the continents of Africa, America, Asia, Australia and Europe to participate in parliamentary conferences, seminars, professional development programmes and academic initiatives related to constitutional affairs and parliamentary services. He also participated in foreign visits as an advisor to Pakistani parliamentary delegates.

== YouTube channel ==
Hanfi regularly shares his poetry and life experiences on his YouTube channel Tahir Hanfi Official.
