= Sana Bucha =

Pakistani TV Journalist

- Born: 12 August 1970 (age 56); Karachi, Pakistan
- Education: Convent of Jesus and Mary, Karachi; King's College London

Sana Bucha (Urdu: ثنا بوچا; born 12 August 1970) is a Pakistani news anchor, who appears in prime time news talk shows. She is known for hosting a show named Lekin.

== Early life and education ==
Sana Bucha received her basic education at the Convent of Jesus and Mary, Karachi School. She received her higher education at King's College London specializing in political science.

== Career ==
Bucha started off as a product development associate and became the producer for the first English Language Bulletin on GEO News. Other than producing it, Bucha frequently hosted the show. After the English bulletin, hosted and produced the channel's English language show News Day. She hosted and served as the executive director for the current affairs program Crisis Cell before switching over to the new program Laikin. Bucha covers topics such as Pakistani politics and foreign relations, South Asia and the Middle East affairs, and American involvement in the region.

In June 2012, Sana Bucha resigned from GEO News, allegedly over the hiring of Aamir Liaquat Hussain, who was also appointed as GEO's vice-president; but Sana later rejoined Geo News after an agreement with their management.

In November 2012, Bucha resigned from Geo again, allegedly over policy differences with Geo Network about Aamir Liaquat hosting a TV show about child activist Malala Yousafzai, and joined Dunya News.

In 2020, Sana Bucha also worked for Aaj News for a few months.

== Filmography ==
- Yalghaar (2017 film) – her role as Sadia
- Quetta: A City of Forgotten Dreams (producer)
