= Adil Raja =

Pakistani journalist and former military officer (born 1978)

Adil Farooq Raja
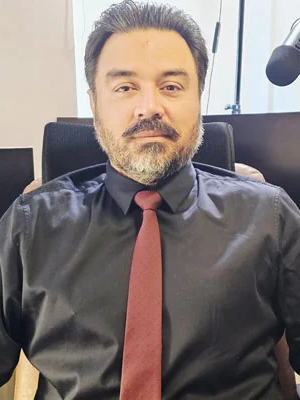
- Adil Raja in 2025
- Born: 15 November 1978
- Education: Pakistan Military Academy; University of Peshawar
- Military career
- Allegiance: Pakistan
- Branch: Pakistan Army
- Service years: 1999–2017
- Rank: Major
- Unit: 18th Horse Regiment
- Other work: Journalist; YouTuber

Adil Farooq Raja (Urdu: عادل راجہ; born 15 November 1978) is a Pakistani journalist and former military officer. He served as a major in the Pakistan Army until his retirement in 2017. He later served as a spokesperson for the Pakistan Ex-Servicemen Society (PESS) until 2022, when he announced his resignation.

In April 2022, Raja was reported missing from Islamabad before later resurfacing in the United Kingdom. After relocating to the United Kingdom, Raja became known for producing YouTube videos under the channel Soldier Speaks where he describes himself as a whistleblower and critic of the military establishment of Pakistan. He has since been court-martialed for sedition and espionage and sentenced in absentia to 14 years of imprisonment, and designated and convicted under anti-terror laws in Pakistan which has requested his extradition. The convictions have been criticised as transnational repression targeting journalists. In November 2026, Raja announced that he had been elected to the National Executive Council of the National Union of Journalists, representing South East England.

== Early life, education and military career ==
Raja was born on 15 November 1978 in Pakistan. He belongs to a Punjabi Muslim Chib Rajput family with a military background. During World War I, his great-grandfather, Subedar Major Sardar Niaz Ali Khan of the British Indian Army, was sentenced to life imprisonment in Kala Pani for refusing to fight against the Ottoman Empire. His father, Major (retired) Umar Farooq Raja, also served in the Pakistan Army.

Raja joined the Pakistan Military Academy (PMA) and was commissioned into the Pakistan Army in 1999 as part of the 99th PMA Long Course. He graduated from PMA with a bachelor's degree in history and international relations, along with military and general sciences.

While serving in the Pakistan Army, Raja completed a master's degree in international relations from the University of Peshawar between 2006 and 2008. He later enrolled at Quaid-e-Azam University, Islamabad, where he undertook coursework toward an MPhil in international relations and affairs from 2013 to 2015, completing the first two semesters with a Grade A before interrupting his studies due to operational commitments related to Pakistan’s National Action Plan against terrorism and extremism. During this period, he was involved in managing a Pakistan Army de-radicalization program in Swat, Khyber Pakhtunkhwa.

Raja served in the Pakistan Army from 1999 to 2017 and retired as a major. During his service, he was associated with the ISI and later served as a spokesperson for the Pakistan Ex-Servicemen Society (PESS) from 2019 to 2022 when he resigned.

Following his retirement from the military, Raja said he started a land acquisition business, later stating that his firm worked with organisations including Defence Housing Authority and Bahria Town.

== Exile and activism ==
=== 2022 disappearance and relocation to the United Kingdom ===
In April 2022, Raja resigned as spokesperson of the Pakistan Ex-Servicemen Society and was reported missing from Islamabad. His wife, Sabine Kayani, said on social media that she had been unable to contact him and sought help tracing his whereabouts. Dawn reported that men claiming to be from the Federal Investigation Agency had allegedly raided the residence of Raja’s mother while Raja was not present, and that Raja had shared a police complaint alleging threats to his life. Raja later stated that he had safely reached his family in the United Kingdom, while The Express Tribune also reported that he had reached London after the reports of his disappearance.

Later reports linked Raja’s departure to pressure on him and his family. In 2025, The Week reported that Raja left Pakistan on 21 April 2022 on a flight to London via Doha, and cited his UK court witness statement alleging raids on his office and his mother’s house before his departure. After relocating to the United Kingdom, Raja became active through his Soldier Speaks platform, presenting himself as a whistleblower and critic of Pakistan’s military establishment. His videos include claims of involvement by senior officers in political interference and human rights abuses, and have reportedly gained a following among critics of Pakistan's military establishment. In November 2026, Raja announced that he had been elected to the National Union of Journalists’ National Executive Council for South East England and re-elected to its Freelance Sector Council for a second year.

== Transnational repression ==
Raja has reported on what he describes as transnational repression by the Pakistani military establishment, focusing on efforts to intimidate, harass, or silence political dissidents living abroad. In articles and video content published after his relocation to the United Kingdom, he has alleged that critics of Pakistan's military establishment face surveillance, coercion, and threats outside Pakistan. Raja has stated that he himself has been subjected to such pressure. The issue of Pakistani transnational repression has been widely documented in reports by international human-rights organisations, including Amnesty International and Human Rights Watch, as well as by United Nations special rapporteurs, who have warned that the government increasingly targets critics beyond its borders through intimidation, harassment, and violence. Pakistani authorities have denied involvement in such activities.

In March 2026, the Washington-based organization Freedom House reported that Pakistan had intensified its campaign of transnational repression targeting exiled journalists and political commentators. The report cited cases involving Pakistani dissidents abroad, including investigations by British counter-terrorism police into alleged attacks against exiled critics in the United Kingdom. According to prosecutors, several individuals were charged in connection with a plot targeting former military officer and journalist Adil Raja and human-rights lawyer Mirza Shahzad Akbar, during which Raja’s residence in London was ransacked and Akbar was assaulted.

=== Extradition request ===
On 4 December 2025, Pakistani interior minister Mohsin Naqvi filed an extradition request on the behalf of the government of Pakistan to the UK High Commissioner to Pakistan Jane Marriott, seeking the extradition of Raja. The request was accompanied by documents citing allegations of anti-state propaganda.

According to media reports, Naqvi linked the extradition request to Pakistan's acceptance of the return of two ringleaders of the Rochdale grooming gang, arrangement that British officials said had been discussed but not agreed.

Raja rejected the extradition effort, describing it as "politically motivated". In an interview with The Telegraph, he said the move amounted to "transnational repression" aimed at silencing his journalism, adding that he had committed no offence under UK law and that the allegations against him stemmed from his reporting on human-rights abuses and corruption within Pakistan’s military establishment.

On 27 January 2026, the National Union of Journalists (NUJ) released a statement expressing concern over what it described as unexplained incidents affecting NUJ member Adil Raja. The statement urged the UK government to resist any attempt to extradite Raja and condemned what it referred to as transnational repression targeting journalists, adding that the government has a duty to protect journalists and ensure their human rights are respected.

In April 2026, The Freelance, published by the National Union of Journalists’ London Freelance Branch, reported that Raja said he had received threats in March 2026 from an individual claiming links to the White House and US intelligence agencies, and that the matter had been reported to UK authorities.

In July 2026, ''The Telegraph'' reported that Pakistani officials had again linked discussions over the return of convicted Rochdale grooming gang ringleader Shabir Ahmed to Islamabad's demands concerning UK-based dissidents and political activists. According to the report, Pakistan was prepared to consider Ahmed's return if Britain addressed its concerns over figures including Raja, Shahzad Akbar and Altaf Hussain. NDTV and ''The Times of India'', citing ''The Telegraph'', reported that Pakistan had sought the extradition of Raja and Akbar over allegations of spreading "fake news" and anti-state propaganda.

Raja subsequently criticised The Telegraph's coverage, saying that the newspaper had approached him for comment but did not publish the statement he provided. He described the report as "one-sided" and said that his "only crime" was speaking out against what he called unaccountable power in Pakistan and practising journalism as an accredited member of the National Union of Journalists.

In July 2026, ABP News reported that it had obtained a January 2026 letter from then-UK Security Minister Dan Jarvis to British MP Sarah Green concerning Raja's extradition. In the letter, Jarvis said that the UK regularly raised concerns with Pakistan regarding democratic freedoms and human rights, including restrictions on freedom of expression and assembly, and stated that attempts by foreign powers to intimidate, harass or harm individuals in the United Kingdom would not be tolerated. Jarvis did not confirm or deny the existence of an extradition request, stating that extradition decisions were a matter for the judiciary.

Later that month, The Times reported that Raja had not been informed of any renewed extradition request. He accused Pakistan of exploiting the political pressure facing the British government over the deportation of Shabir Ahmed, but said he had seen no indication that the United Kingdom would agree to such an arrangement.

=== House break-in and assault ===
In late December 2025, Raja's residence in Chesham, England, was broken into by two men described by police as wearing dark clothing while the property was unoccupied. Officers from Counter Terrorism Policing London (SO15) took over the investigation due to the targeted nature of the incident, which police said was being treated as a potential attack on a dissident figure. UK counter-terrorism police stated that they were investigating the break-in alongside related attacks on fellow critic of the Pakistani military establishment Shahzad Akbar in Cambridge, which included assaults and property damage, and that the incidents were being examined as potentially linked and coordinated. Indian news outlet ABP News published an investigative report alleging that individuals linked to Pakistani intelligence services, specifically the Inter-Services Intelligence (ISI), had discussed or prepared plans for overseas operations targeting critics of the military establishment, including Raja. The report cited intelligence-related material and described the alleged targeting as part of a broader pattern of transnational repression against dissidents abroad.

In January 2026, three British men appeared at Westminster Magistrates' Court and were charged in connection with the attack on Raja and Akbar. Prosecutors said the men were part of a coordinated plan to target the two critics on 24 December 2025, with charges including conspiracy to assault Raja and offences linked to assaults, attempted arson, and possession of a prohibited weapon in relation to attacks on Akbar’s property. According to prosecutors, the incidents were highly targeted and occurred at the homes of the two men at almost the same time. The Crown Prosecution Service authorised the charges, and the investigation was led by Counter Terrorism Policing London due to the nature of the incidents. The defendants were remanded in custody and scheduled to appear at the Old Bailey at a later date. Analysts have noted that the reported attacks occurred shortly after Raja and other critics were tried in absentia in Pakistan.

Following the charges, Raja welcomed the developments, stating that the incidents were “serious and targeted attacks” and that he would continue to cooperate fully with British authorities as the case proceeded.

Further details emerged in late January 2026 regarding the fourth man charged in connection with the incidents. Louis Regan, 25, appeared at Westminster Magistrates' Court, where prosecutors alleged that he had acted as a "hitman for hire" and was the "controlling mind" behind a planned and coordinated effort to attack Raja and Akbar. According to the prosecution, the alleged plot involved simultaneous attacks at the two men's homes on Christmas Eve 2025 and was described in court as "planned and sophisticated". Prosecutors alleged that Regan had carried out reconnaissance of both addresses and led the group that assaulted Akbar at his Cambridge home, while a separate group went to Raja's residence in Chesham but found him absent. Regan was charged with conspiracy to commit assault occasioning actual bodily harm and remanded in custody alongside three co-defendants.

In February 2026, UK authorities announced that three further men had been charged in connection with the attacks on Raja and Akbar, bringing the total number of individuals charged in the investigation to seven. The men, Mark Regan, Liam McGarry, and Asaf Afsar were charged with conspiracy to cause actual bodily harm in relation to incidents on 24 December 2025, according to the Metropolitan Police. Court proceedings reported by the BBC and The Independent identified Mark Regan as the father of Louis Regan. All three men were arrested on 3 February 2026 and appeared before Westminster Magistrates' Court, where they were remanded in custody pending a joint hearing at the Old Bailey on 13 February, as the investigation continued under the direction of Counter Terrorism Policing London.

In March 2026, Dawn reported that an eighth man had been charged in the same investigation. The suspect was remanded in custody, while the Metropolitan Police said the investigation remained ongoing.

In July 2026, prosecutors at the Old Bailey dropped the part of the case alleging that the attacks on Raja and Shahzad Akbar were carried out on behalf of a foreign state under the National Security Act 2023. Prosecutors said that the defendants were allegedly hired to carry out the coordinated attacks, but that it could not be established that they knew of any connection to a foreign power. When the judge asked whether this was why the National Security Act element had been dropped, the prosecutor replied that “this appeared to be the case.” The decision did not end the prosecution, and the defendants continued to face charges of conspiracy to assault Raja and Akbar. Trials were scheduled for January and March 2027.

In July 2026, Raja said that he continued to live in hiding at a secure location and that British police still considered him to be under active threat. He said Scotland Yard had recently briefed him on security protocols and that several British agencies were involved in measures intended to protect him.

== Legal proceedings ==
=== Court-martial and sedition conviction ===
In 2023, Raja was charged under the Pakistan Army Act, 1952, the Official Secrets Act, 1923, the Pakistan Penal Code, the Prevention of Electronic Crimes Act, 2016, and the Anti-Terrorism Act, 1997 for inciting sedition, defamation, espionage, and acts prejudicial to state interests. A Field General Court Martial convicted him in absentia on 7 and 9 October 2023, sentencing him to 14 years of rigorous imprisonment and forfeiting his military rank on 21 November 2023. The conviction came after his content allegedly fomented rebellion, including during the May 9, 2023, protests that targeted military installations.

=== UK defamation case ===
In August 2022, retired Brigadier Rashid Naseer filed a defamation case against Raja in London's High Court over online allegations of corruption, electoral interference, judicial manipulation, and human rights abuses. In March 2023, a fake Metropolitan Police summons addressed to Raja circulated online, later debunked by Reuters as fabricated.

The trial opened on 21 July 2025 at the Royal Courts of Justice, with Raja participating remotely due to safety concerns. Witnesses, including former accountability official Shahzad Akbar, testified on alleged election interference in Pakistan's 2024 general elections. In 2025, Raja characterized the defamation case filed against him in the United Kingdom as an effort by the ISI to weaponise libel laws to suppress dissent.

On 9 October 2025, Richard Spearman, sitting as a Deputy High Court Judge, ruled that the statements published by Adil Raja were defamatory in law, finding that they were not supported by sufficient evidence and met the legal standard required in defamation proceedings. The defence of truth was withdrawn during trial, and the court awarded £50,000 in damages and ordered Raja to pay approximately £300,000 in legal costs. In April 2025, the court had also ordered £6,100 in interim costs. Rashid Naseer stated that the publications led to death threats and privacy concerns involving his family. Raja appealed the decision, maintaining that his reporting concerned matters of public interest and describing the case as a form of strategic lawsuit against public participation (SLAPP). However, on 4 March 2026, Raja lost his appeal on all grounds at the Court of Appeal, with the final ruling by Lord Justice Mark Warby ordering that Raja cannot seek a review or appeal against the decision anymore, and that he must comply with the original court decision to pay damages and legal costs to Naseer.

=== Proscription under anti-terror law ===
In December 2025, the government of Pakistan declared Raja a proscribed person under the Anti-Terrorism Act, 1997. According to official notifications cited by the media, the government stated that it had "reasonable grounds to believe" his activities posed a threat to public order and national security. The proscription directed that Raja's name be placed on the Fourth Schedule of the act, which allows authorities to impose monitoring and movement restrictions on designated individuals.

=== Anti-terror conviction ===
In January 2026, an anti-terrorism court in Islamabad sentenced Raja to two life terms in absentia after convicting him on terrorism-related charges linked to online activity in support of former prime minister Imran Khan and the May 9, 2023 protests. British counter-terrorism police had previously investigated similar allegations against Raja and, in March 2024, dropped the case citing a lack of evidence; Raja later said that UK authorities had apologised following the decision. The court ruled that the content published by Raja and several other journalists, including Shaheen Sehbai and Wajahat Saeed Khan, and YouTubers "fell within the ambit of terrorism" under Pakistani law. The defendants were not present in court and were reported to be living abroad. Media freedom organisations, including the Committee to Protect Journalists, criticised the convictions as retaliatory. Raja rejected the ruling, stating that the case was "not a criminal matter" but "an act of transnational repression aimed at silencing critics." Raja described the verdict on X as an attempt to criminalise dissent, arguing that telling the truth to those in power is being labelled "digital terrorism" in Pakistan.

=== PECA case ===
In April 2026, Raja was named in an FIR registered by Pakistan’s National Cyber Crime Investigation Agency under the Prevention of Electronic Crimes Act, alongside journalist Fakhar Ur Rehman and others. The FIR alleged that the accused had spread false and misleading information against state institutions on X (formerly Twitter).

== See also ==
- Imran Khan
- Mirza Shahzad Akbar
