= Mubashir Lucman =

Pakistani anchor (born 1963)

Mubasher Luqman
- مبشر لقمان
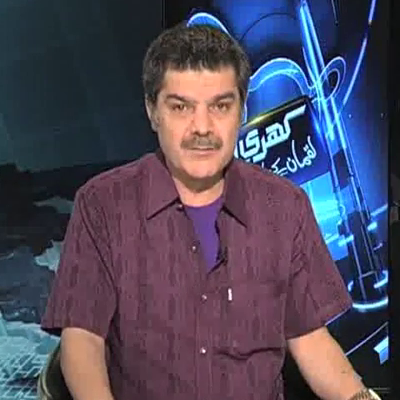
- Lucman in 2012
- Born: 11 January 1963 (age 63); Lahore, Punjab, Pakistan
- Occupation: News anchor
- Children: 2

YouTube information
- Channel: Mubasher Lucman Official
- Years active: 2018–present
- Subscribers: 2.42 million
- Views: 492 million
- Last updated: 4 August 2026

Mubasher Lucman is a Pakistani anchorperson and columnist. He was made caretaker Minister of Punjab for information technology, communications and works in 2007–08. He launched ARY Digital as its first CEO. He is one of the key members of WorldCall, Pakistan's first fiber-optic network. He also worked in the corporate field, in key positions at WorldCall Group, ARY Digital, NTM (first private television network of Pakistan), and PAKTEL.

As of 2014, he had conducted over 2,500 television shows, most of which focused on investigative reporting.

== Early life and education ==
Born to movie director-producer of the 1950s and 1960s Luqman (1922-1994), Mubasher Lucman graduated from Aitchison College Lahore and Government College Lahore.

== Showbusiness career ==
=== Theatre ===
In Lucman's youth, he gained popularity and recognition for his theatre plays. He directed a number of productions. His first job was at the Lahore Hilton (present-day Avari) when he had just started in Government College Lahore.

=== Copywriting and advertisement ===
Later, Lucman joined an advertising agency as a copywriter. He had worked in the advertising industry of Pakistan for several years and proved his skills through his script for the advertisement of top local and multinational brands of Pakistan including Coca-Cola and Nestle.

=== Production company ===
Lucman set up a production company of his own which developed software and content for television channels of Pakistan.

=== Television and cinema ===
In 1999, Lucman directed the drama Parchain for the private channel NTM.

Lucman produced, co-wrote and directed the film Pehla Pehla Pyaar in 2006, starring Resham and Ali Tabish.

=== Music ===
In 2015, Lucman sung a cover of the 1960s classic Summer Wine alongside Aima Baig, whose father is a friend of Lucman.

== Anchor career ==
Lucman has entered television journalism in 2006. He started anchoring from the channel Business Plus as a host. He joined Express News as a host with the programme Point Blank and later moved to Dunya News and hosted the programme Khari Baat Lucman Ke Sath. He then joined ARY News, hosting Khara Sach. He worked for BOL Network, the newly launched TV channel at the time, with his programme Meri Jang for a short while. However, the channel was banned by PEMRA due to the Axact scandal. After a while he joined Samaa, continuing with his hit programme Khara Sach with Mubasher Lucman.

== Controversies ==
=== PEMRA ban (2014) ===
His show Khara Sach was banned by the Pakistan Electronic Media Regulatory Authority (PEMRA) in 2014 due to Lucman's outspoken words.

=== Sexist comments on Bollywood actresses (2025) ===
On a 6 May 2025 Rasta News Network podcast episode with journalist Naeem Hanif, Lucman sparked outrage in both India and Pakistan following vulgar remarks in which he said that he would take Bollywood actresses as spoils of war, impliedly referring to sex slaves, if Pakistan were to win a war against India. The comments caused significant controversy amid the Pahalgam terror attack and the 2025 India–Pakistan crisis.

== Writings ==
Luqman has contributed newspaper columns in both Pakistan and the United Kingdom.

His books include:

- کھرا سچ : بابا جى کے نام / Kharā Sach : Bābā Jī Ke Nām, Jumhūrī Publications, Lahore, 2014, 208 p. On the alleged corruption of Independent Media Corporation (Pvt.) Ltd and its alleged ties with the Indian secret agencies.
