= Daily Mashriq =

Daily newspaper in Pakistan

- Founder: Inayat Ullah Khan
- Political alignment: Conservative
- Language: Urdu
- Country: Pakistan
- Website: Official website (in Urdu)

Daily Mashriq (Pashto: روﺯنامه مشرق) is an Urdu-language daily newspaper published from Peshawar, provincial capital of Khyber Pakhtunkhwa, Pakistan. Muhammad Iqbal Khawaja is the current chief editor of the newspaper.

== History ==
Daily Mashriq was founded in 1963 by Inayat Ullah Khan. Its name translates to 'East' in Urdu.

In 1964, the newspaper was nationalized by the military regime of Ayub Khan and subsequently, it became part of the National Press Trust (NPT), which was established to manage nationalized independent newspapers in order to deter free media. NPT reissued the paper from Peshawar in 1967, with additional editions from Karachi the same year and Quetta in 1972. It remained in government hands until the government of Benazir Bhutto abolished the NPT in 1994 and privatized all newspapers. In 2010, one of their employees Misri Khan Orakzai was assassinated by the outlawed terrorist group Tehrik-e Taliban.

== Political stance ==
Daily Mashriq is influential among those shaping policies and making decisions. It generally aligns with state policies on foreign affairs, including those involving regional countries such as Afghanistan, India, and Iran. At the same time, the newspaper maintains a focus on the political, economic, and civic challenges faced by its target readership, maintaining a balanced reportage.

== Contributors ==
- Intizar Hussain
- Hasan Abidi

== See also ==
- List of newspapers in Pakistan
