= Shaheen Sehbai =

Pakistani-American journalist

- Occupation: Journalist
- Title: Former Group Editor of The News International

Shaheen Sehbai is a Pakistani-American journalist and former Group Editor of daily English newspaper The News International.

== Career ==
Shaheen Sehbai was born and raised in Peshawar. He graduated in MSc Geology from University of Peshawar before starting his career in journalism following in the footsteps of his father. Sehbai resigned from The News International in March 2002 after receiving a memorandum from his publisher admonishing him for publishing libelous material, alienating advertisers, and generally avoiding senior government officials as well his own staff, among other complaints; Sehbai claimed that the criticism was because he failed to support the Musharraf government. In August 2002, the Committee to Protect Journalists sent a public letter to then-President Pervez Musharraf to draw his attention to alleged harassment of Sehbai's family.

In July 2010, Sehbai filed a defamation notice against Azeem Daultana, a member of the National Assembly of Pakistan and two newspapers for publishing a column written by Daultana. The notice complains that the column alleges that Sehbai had undertaken a "revenge mission" against then President Asif Ali Zardari because Sehbai had been "denied" an Ambassadorship, a claim that was originally made in an Aftab Iqbal column published in Nawa-i-Waqt on December 29, 2008.

In April 2016, Shaheen Sehbai resigned from The News International, citing concerns about the newspaper's political leaning and claiming that the paper "unnecessarily engaged in a dangerous conflict with national institutions."

On June 12, 2023, Islamabad Police filed a First Information Report (FIR) against Sehbai, alongside fellow journalist Wajahat Saeed Khan and others, accusing them of "abetting mutiny" and inciting attacks on the Pakistani military, under Pakistan Army Act Section 131 and related terrorism and sedition charges under the Anti-Terrorism Act, for their coverage of the May 9 riots. Reporters Without Borders and the Committee to Protect Journalists, condemned the FIR as transnational repression of journalists. On January 1, 2026, an Anti-Terrorism Court in Islamabad convicted Sehbai in absentia and sentenced him to two consecutive life terms, along with Khan, Adil Raja and other journalists.
