= Shahzeb Khanzada =

Pakistani news anchor (born 1986)

- شاہ زیب خانزادہ
- Born: 20 September 1986 (age 40); Tharu Shah, Sindh, Pakistan
- Education: Industrial Electronics Engineer from the Institute of Industrial Electronics Engineering, Karachi; MBA from the Institute of Business Management (CBM), Karachi
- Occupations: Columnist; news anchor; journalist
- Years active: 2009-present
- Employer: Geo News
- Organization: Geo News (2015-present)
- Notable work: Aaj Shahzeb Khanzada Kay Sath
- Spouse: Rushna (m. 2018)
- Website: shahzebkhanzada.com

Shahzeb Khanzada (Urdu: شاہ زیب خانزادہ; born 20 September 1986) is a Pakistani journalist, columnist and news anchor, currently hosting a current affairs television program Aaj Shahzeb Khanzada Kay Sath (lit. 'Today with Shahzeb Khanzada') on Geo News.

== Personal life ==
Shahzeb was born on 20 September 1986, in Tharu Shah, Pakistan, to a Rajasthani Khanzada Rajput family. He is a descendant of Raja Nahar Khan, a 14-century Rajput ruler of Mewat.

== Career ==
In 2009, Shahzeb started his journalistic career with Business Plus TV channel. He then hosted the program To the Point on Express News. In 2013, he won the Best Anchorperson Award at the 4th Pakistan Media Awards.
Currently, he hosts the late night show Aaj Shahzaib Khanzada Kay Sath on Geo News.

== Filmography ==
=== Television (as a screenwriter) ===
Year	Title	Network	Director	Notes	Ref(s)
2025	Case No. 9	Geo Entertainment	Syed Wajahat Hussain	Debut as a Writer	
TBA	Case No. 10 †	TBA	TBA		

=== Television (as an actor) ===
Year	Title	Role	Network	Director	Notes	Ref(s)
2025	Case No. 9	News Anchor (Himself)	Geo Entertainment	Syed Wajahat Hussain	Extended Cameo	

== Awards and nominations ==
Year	Award	Category	Work	Result	Ref
2013	4th Pakistan Media Awards	Best Anchorperson	—N/a	Won	
