= Agahi Award =

Pakistani media award

The Agahi Awards are an annual series of awards for journalism in Pakistan. They were inaugurated in 2012 and are Pakistan's first ever Journalism Awards. These awards are organized by Mishal Pakistan, which is a media consultancy firm, in collaboration with leading press clubs across the country, local and international media development bodies, regulatory authorities and the private sector.

== History ==
The Agahi Awards took place for the first time ever, on 28 March 2012, in Islamabad, Pakistan. The awards were organized by Mishal Pakistan and AGAHI foundation, which is a non-profit organization aimed at improving investigative journalism in Pakistan.

The Agahi Awards are aimed at recognizing the best journalists reporting on critical issues ranging from; Terrorism, Conflict, Interfaith, Safety & Security, Code of Conduct etc. This initiative is aimed at scaling up the training and capacity building efforts of the journalists in Pakistan, by creating a sense of competition in them.

The Agahi Awards is an endeavour undertaken by AGAHI Foundation, which is a program which was launched in 2011 by Mishal Pakistan, for increasing the capacity of investigative and responsible journalism in Pakistan. The Agahi Awards are going to be an annual event in which nominations will be submitted for different categories including People's Choice Awards.

== Categories ==
The Agahi Awards called for nominations in the following categories;

1. Business & Economy
2. Conflict
3. Corruption
4. Crime
5. Education
6. Energy, Water and Food Security
7. Environment
8. Gender
9. Governance
10. Health
11. Human Rights
12. Infotainment
13. Interfaith
14. Judiciary
15. Media Ethics
16. Photo Journalism
17. Terrorism and Extremism
18. Miscellaneous

== Rules ==
AGAHI has developed a set of rules based upon which nominations in the categories are evaluated. These set of rules have been in collaboration with the Center for International Media Ethics (CIME). The entries submitted are evaluated on the following indicators;

1. Content reflecting diversity.
2. Content should serve the need of all groups in the society: public, private and community based.
3. Content displays culture of self-regulation.
4. Communicating with fairness and impartiality.
5. Content displays high-level of trust and confidence with the civil society organization/academia.
6. The content should also reflect the linguistic diversity of the targeted issues.
7. The content should represent the views of the entire political spectrum and the wide spectrum of the social interests including the weakest segments of the society.

== Venue ==
The Agahi Awards 2012 took place at the Pakistan-China Friendship Center, located in the heart of Islamabad,

== Award event ==
The Event was attended by leading journalists from Pakistan and other countries. The evaluation committee consisted of 17 judges who were all leading journalists from different countries. The winners were handed out trophies and two special trophies were also given out based on 'People's Choice Awards'.

== Media coverage ==
The Agahi Awards were given coverage on a national level and footage from the awards was telecasted on different national news channels including; Geo News, Samaa TV and Express TV.

== Controversy ==
The Agahi Awards were branded as the "First Journalism Awards in Pakistan" and their tagline was "Shaping the future of journalism in Pakistan". When this event was marketed, it created quite a stir amongst the journalists who claimed that these were not the 'first' journalism awards, in fact the journalism awards conducted by APNS (All Pakistan Newspapers Society), were the first ones to be held in this country.
