= Kamran Khan (journalist) =

Pakistani journalist (born 1956)

- Born: 1956 (age 69–70); Karachi, Sindh, Pakistan
- Education: University of Karachi
- Occupation: Journalist
- Years active: 1997–present
- Employer: ARY News (2026-present)
- Television: YouTube (2024-present); Dunya News (2015–2024); BOL Network (2014–2015); Geo News (2002–2014)

Kamran Khan (Urdu: کامران خان) is a Pakistani journalist who is the founder of Nukta, an AI-powered digital content platform on YouTube.

Previously, he hosted the talk show Dunya Kamran Khan Kay Sath on Dunya News and Aaj Kamran Khan Ke Saath on Geo News.

Kamran Khan has been credited with bringing investigative journalism into the mainstream electronic media in Pakistan. His reporting during major political and military crises in the 1990s and 2000s earned him a reputation as a trusted news source.

== Journalistic career ==
Following his graduation, Khan embarked on a career in journalism, starting as an investigative reporter for Karachi's Daily News in 1982. His early work quickly garnered attention, leading to contributions to international publications such as The Sunday Times and The Washington Post.

Khan began his career in print media, writing Urdu-language investigative columns for various national newspapers, including those associated with the Jang Media Group, where he focused on political corruption, national security, and governance. He has acknowledged in interviews that his early work in Urdu journalism shaped his professional ethos.

In September 1991, Khan was stabbed in Karachi after receiving threatening telephone calls warning him against writing stories about government corruption. The threats began after Khan wrote an article alleging police misconduct in Sindh, including extortion and illegal confinement.

Khan has also received threats following a Washington Post story he contributed to about Asif Ali Zardari. Despite changes in government, Khan continued to publish investigative stories about government corruption and periodically received threats. During that period, he worked as a stringer for The Washington Post. Later, he worked as a special correspondent for The Washington Post.

== Anchoring career ==
He gained widespread recognition through his television programs, most notably:

- Aaj Kamran Khan Kay Sath (Today with Kamran Khan) – Aired on Geo News from 2002 to 2014, this show became a major platform for investigative reporting on Pakistani politics and national affairs.
- Dunya Kamran Khan Kay Sath – After moving to Dunya News, Khan continued his work as a host and editor, analyzing political developments and government accountability. It ran from 2015 to 2024.
