= Geo News =

Pakistani pay television news channel

Geo News HD
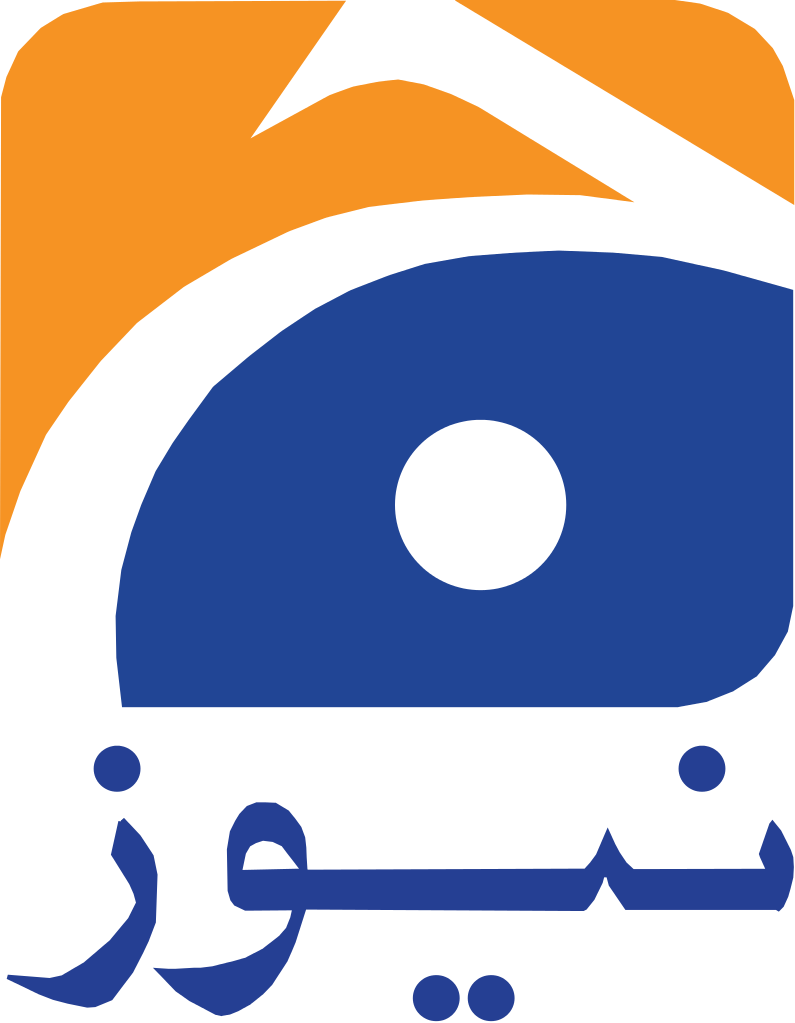
- Country: Pakistan
- Broadcast area: South Asia, Canada and Middle East
- Network: Jang Media Group
- Headquarters: Karachi, Sindh, Pakistan

Programming
- Language: Urdu
- Picture format: (1080p 16:9 MPEG-4 HDTV)

Ownership
- Owner: Mir Shakil-ur-Rahman; Jang Media Group; Mir Ibrahim Rahman
- Sister channels: List: Geo Entertainment Geo Super Geo Tez Geo Kahani

History
- Launched: August 2002; 24 years ago

Links
- Website: www.geo.tv

Availability

Streaming media
- Geo News Live: Watch Live
- Geo News Live Stream: Watch Live

Geo News (Urdu: جیو نیوز) is a Pakistani TV news channel owned by the Jang Media Group, formerly known as Jang Group of Newspapers.

The channel was launched in October 2002 by Mir Shakil-ur-Rahman, as a news and current affairs programs channel. Geo News was under its flagship channel Geo TV. Geo TV was the biggest news channel in Pakistan in 2007 and still in 2025.

== History ==
Geo News was launched in October 2002 as Geo TV. According to Dawn newspaper of Pakistan, "Since its launch, Geo TV has tested the bounds of freedom of expression in Pakistan to unprecedented levels in the country's history. This has also put Geo TV in numerous conflicts with the Pakistani government".

In November 2007, under Pervez Musharraf's ruling period, a temporary 'state of emergency' was declared by the government, and all Pakistani news media, newspapers and TV channels came under high pressure to tow the government line including Geo News TV channel.

"There has been a marked increase in visits to the website of Geo TV, the first television station in Pakistan to broadcast independent news programmes. It is now reportedly receiving more than 1 million visits a day. Sales of newspapers, especially issues with supplements on the state of emergency, have also soared since the ban was imposed on privately-owned radio and TV stations".

In June 2014, Geo News license was suspended by the Pakistani government for 15 days for their accusation and allegation against the Inter-Services Intelligence (ISI) agency and its then-chief Zaheer-ul-Islam for attacking its journalist Hamid Mir.

"The controversy erupted after Mr. Mir's brother accused "certain elements" in the ISI and its chief of orchestrating the attack, a charge denied by the military".

"Geo TV network and Jang Group, which owns the channel, on May 26 had issued an apology to Pakistan's armed forces and the ISI for making the allegations".

In 2018, the employees of Geo News were not paid for three months and the editor-in-chief was summoned to explain the situation. The late Imran Aslam, an executive of Geo Network at the time, said, "This is an attempt to financially cripple the organization into submission." The news channel owner, Mir Shakil-ur-Rehman, has also been summoned by the court in the past on the issue of non-payment of employee salaries.

== Controversies ==
According to Delcan Walsh, The New York Times journalist, some militant outfits including Tehrik-i-Taliban Pakistan, Lashkar-e-Jhangvi, and MQM-L's alleged militant wing have infiltrated the Geo group that helped them in executing the murder of the journalist Wali Khan Babar and the PNS Mehran attack in 2011.

== Hosts and analyst ==
=== Current ===
- Shahzad Iqbal
- Suhail Warraich
- Shahzeb Khanzada
- Hamid Mir
- Saleem Safi
- Mazhar Abbas

=== Former ===
- Kamran Khan
- Mehwish Hayat
- Shahid Masood
- Ayesha Bakhsh
- Najam Sethi
- Sana Bucha
- Saba Qamar
- Shaan Shahid
- Aamir Liaquat Hussain
- Aftab Iqbal
- Fiza Ali

== Programming ==
=== Current programming ===
- Naya Pakistan
- Aaj Shahzeb Khanzada Kay Sath
- Aik Din Geo Kay Sath with Suhail Warraich
- Capital Talk
- Geo Pakistan
- Jirga with Saleem Safi
- Jurm O Saza
- Report Card
- SCORE about sports
- Sports Floor

=== Former programming ===
- Aapas ki Baat
- BNN (2011–2015)
- Burka Avenger
- Team Muhafiz (2022)
- Hum Sub Umeed Se Hain (2007 - 2015)

== See also ==
- List of news channels in Pakistan
