= Dunya News =

TV news channel in Pakistan

Dunya News HD (Pakistan) دنیا نیوز
- Country: Pakistan
- Broadcast area: South Asia, United Kingdom, United States and Middle East
- Headquarters: Lahore, Punjab, Pakistan

Programming
- Language: Urdu
- Picture format: (1080p 16:9, HDTV MPEG-4)

Ownership
- Owner: Mian Amer Mahmood
- Sister channels: Dunya Entertainment, Lahore News

History
- Launched: December 1, 2008; 17 years ago

Links
- Website: Dunya News; Dunya News Urdu; Lahore News

Availability

Streaming media
- Dunya News Live: Watch Live 24/7

Dunya News HD (Urdu: دنیا نیوز) is a 24-hour Urdu language news and current affairs television channel from Pakistan. It is governed and operated by the National Communication Services (NCS) Pvt. Ltd. Its head office is situated at Lahore. Dunya News was founded and is owned by the Pakistani businessman and politician Mian Amer Mahmood. It has numerous, news-centred television shows, like Dunya Meher Bokhari Kay Sath and On The Front with Kamran Shahid as well as satirical infotainment shows like Hasb-e-Haal.

== History ==
Dunya News began transmission in 2008. The channel is known for its centre-right news policy orientation.

Dunya News broadcast Pakistan's two most popular satirical news programs, Hasb-e-Haal and Mazaq Raat Hosted by Imran Ashraf.

Since August 2015, it has made the show Dunya Kamran Khan Kay Sath, hosted by the veteran journalist Kamran Khan (currently president and editor-in-chief of Dunya Media Group).

== See also ==
- Daily Dunya
- List of television stations in Pakistan
- List of news channels in Pakistan
- List of newspapers in Pakistan
