= Mass media in Pakistan =

Mass media in Pakistan provides information on television, radio, cinema, newspapers, and magazines in Pakistan.

Pakistan has a vibrant media landscape; among the most dynamic in South Asia. Pakistan has around 300 privately owned daily newspapers. According to the Pakistan Bureau of Statistics, they had a combined daily sale of 6.1 million copies in 2009. Television is the main source of news and information for people in Pakistan's towns, cities and large areas of the countryside. Marketing research company Gallup Pakistan, estimated there were 86 million TV viewers in Pakistan in 2009. According to a report by the Pakistan Institute of Development Economics (PIDE) in 2021, Pakistan’s media sector experienced rapid expansion after liberalisation in the early 2000s. Employment in the media industry increased from around 2,000 workers in 2002 to approximately 250,000 by 2018. The number of working journalists in 2018 was estimated at about 18,000. The report estimated the total annual revenue of the media industry at Rs. 125–150 billion, largely driven by advertising.

Reporters Without Borders in its 2020 Press Freedom Index ranked Pakistan number 145 out of 180 countries based on freedom of the press. Political pressure on media is mostly done indirectly. One tool widely used by the government is to cut off 'unfriendly' media from governmental advertising. Using draconian laws the government has also banned or officially silenced popular television channels. The Pakistan Electronic Media Regulatory Authority (PEMRA) has been used to silence the broadcast media by either suspending licenses or by simply threatening to do so. Media coverage of abuses by both the Pakistan Armed Forces and militant groups is hindered by an ongoing climate of fear. Journalists, who encounter threats and attacks, resort to self-censorship more frequently to protect themselves.

In 2018, the security situation of journalists improved and the number of journalists killed in Pakistan declined considerably. However, press freedom continued to decline. In 2023, after the May 9 riots, the Pakistani government intensified its grip on the media, leading to media professionals experiencing heightened coercion, censorship, and a surge in journalist arrests.

== Overview ==
Since 2002, the Pakistani media has become powerful and independent and the number of private television channels have grown from just three state-run channels in 2000 to 89 in 2012, according to the Pakistan Electronic Media Regulatory Authority. Most of the private media in Pakistan flourished under the Musharraf regime.

Pakistan has a vibrant media landscape and enjoys independence to a large extent. After having been liberalised in 2002, the television sector experienced a media boom. In the fierce competitive environment that followed commercial interests became paramount and quality journalism gave way to sensationalism. Although the radio sector has not seen similar growth, independent radio channels are numerous and considered very important sources of information - especially in the rural areas.

The Pakistani media landscape reflects a multi-linguistic, multi-ethnic and class-divided society. There is a clear divide between Urdu and English media. The Urdu media, particularly the newspapers, are widely read by the masses - mostly in rural areas. The English media is urban and elite-centric, is more liberal and professional compared to the Urdu media. English print, television and radio channels have far smaller audiences than their Urdu counterparts, but have greater leverage among opinion makers, politicians, the business community and the upper strata of society.

Pakistan has a vibrant media landscape in Asia. More than 89 television channels beam soaps, satire, music programmes, films, religious speech, political talk shows, and news of the hour. Although sometimes criticise for being unprofessional and politically biased, the television channels have made a great contribution to the media landscape and to Pakistani society.

Radio channels are numerous and considered a very important source of information - especially in the rural areas. Besides the state channel Radio Pakistan, a number of private radios carry independent journalistic content and news. But most radio content is music and entertainment. There are hundreds of Pakistani newspapers from the large national Urdu newspapers to the small local vernacular papers.

Pakistan's media sector is highly influenced by the ownership structure. There are three dominating media moguls, or large media groups, which to some extent also have political affiliations. Due to their dominance in both print and broadcast industries all three media groups are very influential in politics and society.

== History ==
The media in Pakistan dates back to pre-partition years of British India, where a number of newspapers were established to promote a communalistic or partition agenda. The newspaper Dawn, founded by Muhammad Ali Jinnah and first published in 1941, was dedicated to promoting for an independent Pakistan. The conservative newspaper, Nawa-i-Waqt, established in 1940 was the mouthpiece of the Muslim elites who were among the strongest supporters for an independent Pakistan.

In a sense, Pakistani print media came into existence with a mission to promulgate the idea of Pakistan, which was seen as the best national option for the Muslim minority in British India and as a form of self-defense against suppression from the Hindu majority.

In 2025, a nationwide study on media and communication education in Pakistan surveyed faculty at 92 universities and colleges offering bachelor’s degrees in media and communication studies. The number of higher-education institutions offering media and communication degrees had increased from 21 in 2006 to about 100, with nearly 37,500 students enrolled nationwide.

== Role in exposing corruption ==
Since the introduction of these vibrant TV channels, many major corruption cases and scams have been unveiled by journalists. Notable among them are:

- The Pakistan Steel Mills Rs. 26 billion scam;
- National Insurance Company Limited scandal;
- Bribery and corruption in Pakistan International Airlines which caused losses of $500 million;
- Embezzlement in Pakistan Railways causing massive financial losses;
- Hajj corruption case;
- NATO containers' case where 40 containers heading for ISAF in Afghanistan went missing;
- Rental power projects corruption
- Ephedrine quota case, a scandal involving the son of former Prime Minister Yousaf Raza Gillani to pressure officials of the Health Ministry to allocate a quota of controlled chemical ephedrine to two different pharmaceutical companies.
- Malik Riaz's 'Media Gate' in which the son of Chief Justice Iftikhar Muhammad Chaudhry is said to have taken money from Malik Riaz to give favourable decisions from the Supreme Court.

“Malik Riaz's case proved that the media can hold the judiciary and even itself accountable", says Javed Chaudhry, columnist and anchorperson working with Express News. "This case, along with the missing persons' case has established impartiality and credibility of the media in its fight against corruption". Chaudhry feels, like many others in country, that the media in Pakistan has become free and fair during the last decade. "The Pakistani media has covered the journey of 100 years in just 10 years, but their curiosity and thrust for revelation does not end and that is what drives the media".

== Tensions ==
According to a report by the UK Foreign Office, Pakistan's media environment continued to develop and, in many cases, flourish. Since opening up in 2002, the number and range of media outlets has proliferated, so that Pakistanis now have greater access than ever before to a range of broadcasting through print, television and online media. The increased media penetration into most aspects of Pakistani life has created challenges as well as opportunities, as both the journalistic community and politicians and officials build their understanding of effective freedom of expression and responsible reporting.

However, in 2011, Reporters Without Borders listed Pakistan as one of the ten most deadly places to be a journalist. As the War in North-West Pakistan continued, there have been frequent threats against journalists. The proliferation of the media in Pakistan since 2002 has brought a massive increase in the number of domestic and foreign journalists operating in Pakistan. The UK Foreign Office states that it is vital that the right to freedom of expression continues to be upheld by the Pakistani Government. This was highlighted by an event supporting freedom of expression run by the European Union in Pakistan, which the United Kingdom supported.

Matiullah Jan, a prominent journalist in Pakistan, who highlights the Pakistani Armies atrocities, was picked up from streets in Islamabad. While the media fraternity kept quiet.

== International co-operation ==
=== Support for creation of new media ===
In 2012–14, UPI Next with NearMedia LLC helped Pakistani journalists to create PakPolWiki, an online resource for coverage of the national elections, and Truth Tracker, a fact-checking website. In this project, the team held learning sessions across the country and conducted individual mentoring for journalists to produce stories that meet national and international standards.

NearMedia continued the effort with a project for 2014-15 that, in partnership with Media Foundation 360, launched News Lens Pakistan, an independent online news cooperative which publishes stories in English, Urdu and Pashto for a national audience, and distributes these stories to national and local news outlets. Learning sessions, in which editors work with reporters newsroom-style to improve their skills, are held in districts of all provinces, and international journalists work with the Pakistan team to mentor them individually.

=== Pakistan - US Journalists Exchange Program ===
Since 2011, the East-West Center (EWC), headquartered in Honolulu, Hawaii, have been organising the annual Pakistan - United States Journalists Exchange program. It was launched and designed to increase and deepen public understanding of the two countries and their important relationship, one that is crucial to regional stability and the global war on terrorism. While there have been many areas of agreement and cooperation, deep mistrust remains between the two, who rarely get opportunities to engage with each other and thus rely on media for their information and viewpoints. Unresolved issues continue to pose challenges for both countries.

This exchange offers U.S. and Pakistani journalists an opportunity to gain on-the-ground insights and firsthand information about the countries they visit through meetings with policymakers, government and military officials, business and civil society leaders, and a diverse group of other community members. All participants meet at the East-West Center in Hawaii before and after their study tours for dialogues focused on sensitive issues between the two countries; preconceived attitudes among the public and media in the United States and Pakistan; new perspectives gained through their study tours; and how media coverage between the two countries can be improved. Ten Pakistani journalists will travel to the United States and ten U.S. journalists will travel to Pakistan. This East-West Center program is funded by a grant from the U.S. Embassy Islamabad Public Affairs Section.

The program provides journalists with valuable new perspectives and insights on this critically important relationship, a wealth of contacts and resources for future reporting, and friendships with professional colleagues in the other country upon whom to draw throughout their careers.

=== International Center for Journalists ===
In 2011, the International Center for Journalists (ICFJ), a non-profit, professional organisation located in Washington, D.C. launched the U.S. - Pakistan Professional Partnership in Journalism program, a multi-year program which will bring 230 Pakistani media professionals to the United States and send 70 U.S. journalists to Pakistan. Journalists will study each other's cultures as they are immersed in newsrooms in each country.

The program will include events and opportunities to experience U.S. life, showcasing its diversity. Representatives from the U.S. media hosts will go to Pakistan for two-week programs during which they will learn the realities of Pakistani journalism and national life through site visits, interviews and opportunities to interact with journalists, officials and ordinary Pakistanis.

Pakistanis will receive four-week internships at U.S. media organizations.

Participants on both sides will have opportunities to report on their experiences in each country, which will help to educate their audiences and dispel myths and misconceptions that people carry in each country about residents of the other.

ICFJ has also established the Center for Excellence in Journalism (CEJ) in Karachi, Pakistan. The CEJ serves as a hub for the professional development, training and networking of Pakistani journalists and media professionals from all parts of the country.

Through targeted, practical trainings and the exchange component of the program, the CEJ aims to foster long-lasting connections between the participating universities, media outlets, and professional journalists.

A partnership with Northwestern University's Medill School of Journalism and the Institute of Business Administration (IBA) aims to provide targeted, practical trainings for Pakistani journalists in print, broadcast, and digital media. Courses will be co-instructed by faculty from the Medill School, accomplished newsroom managers, editors and reporters from the United States, and prominent media professionals from Pakistan.

== Regulation ==
=== History ===
The first step in introducing media laws in the country was done by the then military ruler and President Ayub Khan who promulgated the Press and Publication Ordinance (PPO) in 1962. The law empowered the authorities to confiscate newspapers, close down news providers, and arrest journalists. Using these laws, Ayub Khan nationalised large parts of the press and took over one of the two largest news agencies. The other agencies was pushed into severe crisis and had to seek financial support from the government. Pakistani Radio and Television, which was established in 1964 was also brought under the strict control of the government.

More draconian additions were made to the PPO during the reign of General Zia-Ul-Haq in the 1980s. According to these new amendments, the publisher would be liable and prosecuted if a story was not to the liking of the administration even if it was factual and of national interest. These amendments were used to promote Haq's Islamist leanings and demonstrated the alliance between the military and religions leaders. Censorship during the Zia years was direct, concrete and dictatorial. Newspapers were scrutinised; critical or undesired sections of an article censored. In the wake of Zia-ul-Haq's sudden death and the return of democracy, the way was paved to abate the draconian media laws through a revision of media legislation called the Revised PPO (RPPO).

From 2002, under General Pervez Musharraf, the Pakistani media faced a decisive development that would lead to a boom in Pakistani electronic media and paved the way to it gaining political clout. New liberal media laws broke the state's monopoly on the electronic media. TV broadcasting and FM radio licenses were issued to private media outlets.

The military's motivation for liberalising media licensing was based on an assumption that the Pakistani media could be used to strengthen national security and counter any perceived threats from India. What prompted this shift was the military's experience during the two past confrontations with India. One was the Kargil War and the other was the hijacking of the India Airliner by militants. In both these instances, the Pakistani military was left with no options to reciprocate because its electronic media were inferior to that of the Indian media. Better electronic media capacity was needed in the future and thus the market for electronic media was liberalised.

The justification was just as much a desire to counter the Indian media power, as it was a wish to set the media "free" with the rights that electronic media had in liberal, open societies. The military thought it could still control the media and harness it if it strayed from what the regime believed was in the national interest - and in accordance with its own political agenda.

This assessment however proved to be wrong as the media and in particular the new many new TV channels became a powerful force in civil society. The media became an important actor in the process that led to fall of Musharraf and his regime. By providing extensive coverage of the 2007 Lawyer's Movement's struggle to get the chief justice reinstated, the media played a significant role in mobilising civil society. This protest movement, with millions of Pakistanis taking to the streets in the name of having an independent judiciary and democratic rule, left Musharraf with little backing from civil society and the army. Ultimately, he had to call for elections. Recently, due to a renewed interplay between civil society organisations, the Lawyers' Movement and the electronic media, Pakistan's new president, Asif Ali Zardari had to give in to public and political pressure and reinstate the chief justice. The emergence of powerful civil society actors was unprecedented in Pakistani history. These could not have gained in strength without the media, which will need to continue and play a pivotal role if Pakistan has to develop a stronger democracy, greater stability and take on socio-political reforms.

Whether Pakistan's media, with its powerful TV channels, is able to take on such a huge responsibility and make changes from within depends on improving general working conditions; on the military and the state bureaucracy; the security situation of journalists; media laws revision; better journalism training; and lastly on the will of the media and the media owners themselves.

=== Legal framework ===
Though Pakistani media enjoy relative freedom compared to some of its South Asian neighbours, the industry was subjected to many undemocratic and regressive laws and regulations. The country was subjected to alternating military and democratic rule - but has managed to thrive on basic democratic norms. Though the Pakistani media had to work under military dictatorships and repressive regimes, which instituted many restrictive laws and regulations for media in order to 'control' it, the media was not largely affected. The laws are, however, detrimental to democracy reform, and represent a potential threat to the future of Pakistan and democracy.

==== Constitution ====
The root for the article 19 freedom of expression traced from South Asia when any body was directly sentenced to death if they uttered a single word against the government. The Pakistani Constitution guarantees freedom of expression and the basic premise for media freedom. While emphasizing the state's allegiance to Islam, the constitution underlines the key civil rights inherent in a democracy and states that citizens:

Shall be guaranteed fundamental rights, including equality of status, of opportunity and before law, social, economic and political justice, and freedom of thought, expression, belief, faith, worship and association, subject to law and public morality.

==== Media laws ====
There are a number of legislative and regulatory mechanisms that directly and indirectly affect the media. Besides the Press and Publication Ordinance (PPO) mentioned, these laws include the Printing Presses and Publications Ordinance 1988, the Freedom of Information Ordinance of 2002, the Pakistan Electronic Media Regulatory Authority (PEMRA) of 2002, the Defamation Ordinance of 2002, the Contempt of Court Ordinance of 2003, the Press, Newspapers, News Agencies and Books Registration Ordinance 2003, the Press Council Ordinance 2002, the Intellectual Property Organisation of Pakistan Ordinance 2005 and lastly the Access to Information Ordinance of 2006. Also there were attempts in 2006 for further legislation ostensibly "to streamline registration of newspapers, periodicals, news and advertising agencies and authentication of circulation figures of newspapers and periodicals (PAPRA)."

The liberalisation of the electronic media in 2002 was coupled to a bulk of regulations. The opening of the media market led to the mushrooming of satellite channels in Pakistan. Many operators started satellite and/or cable TV outlets without any supervision by the authorities. The government felt that it was losing millions of rupees by not 'regulating' the mushrooming cable TV business.

Another consequence of the 2002 regulations was that most of these were hurriedly enacted by President Musharraf before the new government took office. Most of the new laws that were anti-democratic and were not intended to promote public activism but to increase his control of the public. Many media activists felt that the new regulations were opaque and had been subject to interpretation by the courts which would have provided media practitioners with clearer guidelines.

==== Pakistan Electronic Media Regulatory Authority ====
The Pakistan Electronic Media Regulatory Authority (PEMRA, formerly RAMBO - Regulatory Authority for Media and Broadcast Organizations) was formed in 2002 to "facilitate and promote a free, fair and independent electronic media", including opening the broadcasting market in Pakistan. By the end of 2009 PEMRA had:

- issued 78 satellite TV licenses;
- issued "landing rights" to 28 TV channels operating from abroad, with more under consideration;
- issued licenses for 129 FM radio stations, including 18 non-commercial licenses to leading universities offering courses mass communication and six licenses in Azad Jammu and Kashmir;
- registered 2,346 cable TV systems serving an estimated 8 million households; and
- issued six MMDS (Multichannel Multipoint Distribution Service), two Internet Protocol TV (IPTV), and two mobile TV licenses, with more under consideration.

PEMRA is also involved in media censorship and occasionally halts broadcasts and closes media outlets. Publication or broadcast of "anything which defames or brings into ridicule the head of state, or members of the armed forces, or executive, legislative or judicial organs of the state", as well as any broadcasts deemed to be "false or baseless" can bring jail terms of up to three years, fines of up to 10 million rupees (US$165,000), and license cancellation. In practice, these rules and regulations are not enforced.

In November 2011, Pakistani cable television operators blocked the BBC World News TV channel after it broadcast a documentary, entitled Secret Pakistan. However, Pakistanis with a dish receiver can still watch it and can continue to access its website and web stream. Dr. Moeed Pirzada of PTV stated that it was hypocritical of the foreign media to label it as 'suppression of the media' when the United States continues to ban Al Jazeera English and no cable operator in the US would carry the channel. He also stated that even 'democratic' and 'liberal' Indians refuse to carry a single Pakistani news channel on their cable or any Pakistani op-ed writers in their newspapers.

== Television ==
The first television station began broadcasting from Lahore on 26 November 1964. Television in Pakistan remained the government's exclusive control until 1990 when Shalimar Television Network (STN) and Network Television Marketing (NTM) launched Pakistan's first private TV channel. Mr. Yasin Joyia was the first General Manager of (NTM), Which was shut down very soon by PTV bureaucratic conspiracies. But it was of no use as till then cable TV network was already introduced in urbanized cities, like Rawalpindi, Islamabad, Lahore and Karachi. Foreign satellite TV channels were added during the 1990s.

Traditionally, the government-owned Pakistan Television Corporation (PTV) has been the dominant media player in Pakistan. The PTV channels are controlled by the government and opposition views are not given much time. The past decade has seen the emergence of several private TV channels showing news and entertainment, such as GEO TV, AAJ TV, ARY Digital, BOL Network, HUM, MTV Pakistan and others such as KTN, VSH News, Sindh TV, Awaz TV and Kashish TV. Traditionally the bulk of TV shows have been plays or soap operas, some of them critically acclaimed. Various American, European, Asian TV channels, and movies are available to a majority of the population via cable TV.

Using oppressive laws the government has also banned or officially silenced popular television channels. The Pakistan Electronic Media Regulatory Authority (PEMRA) has been used to silence the broadcast media by either suspending licenses or by simply threatening to do so. In many cases these channels were shifted to obscure numbers in channel line-up. In addition, media is also exposed to propaganda from state agencies, pressured by powerful political elements and non-state actors involved in the current conflict. A number of channels have been shut down in the past with the latest such incident involving Geo TV and other channels in the Geo TV network after a fatwa was issued against it. The shutdown came after the network attempted to air allegations on the involvement of Inter-Services Intelligence in the attempted assassination of its leading anchor Hamid Mir.

In the early 2020s there were some 114 satellite TV channels in Pakistan, with most (42) concentrating on entertainment followed by news and current affairs (31).

== Radio ==
The government-owned Pakistan Broadcasting Corporation (PBC) was formed on 14 August 1947, the day of Pakistani independence. It was a direct descendant of the Indian Broadcasting Company, which later became All India Radio. At independence, Pakistan had radio stations in Dhaka, Lahore, and Peshawar. A major programme of expansion saw new stations open at Karachi and Rawalpindi in 1948, and a new broadcasting house at Karachi in 1950. This was followed by new radio stations at Hyderabad (1951), Quetta (1956), a second station at Rawalpindi (1960), and a receiving centre at Peshawar (1960). During the 1980s and 1990s the corporation expanded its network to many cities and towns of Pakistan to provide greater service to the local people. In October 1998, Radio Pakistan started its first FM transmission.

Today, there are over a hundred public and private radio stations due to more liberal media regulations. FM broadcast licenses are awarded to parties that commit to open FM broadcasting stations in at least one rural city along with the major city of their choice.

== Cinema ==
In the 'golden days' of Pakistani cinema, the film industry churned out more than 200 films annually, today it's one-fifth of what it used to be. The Federal Bureau of Statistics shows that once the country boasted at least 700 cinemas, this number has dwindled to less than 170 by 2005.

The indigenous movie industry, based in Lahore and known as "Lollywood", produces roughly forty feature-length films a year.

=== Censor Board ===
The Central Board of Film Censors (CBFC; Urdu: مرکزی فلم سنسر بورڈ) is a film censorship board and rating system body under the Ministry of Information & Broadcasting for the Government of Pakistan. Since the Eighteenth Amendment to the Constitution of Pakistan its jurisdiction has been limited to Islamabad, Rawalpindi, Cantonments, Khyber Pakhtunkhwa and Balochistan; with separate censor boards for Punjab (Punjab Film Censor Board, PFCB) and Sindh (Sindh Board of Film Censors, SBFC) headquartered in Lahore and Karachi respectively. Though the CBFC maintains an unofficial dominant position over the latter boards.

These boards are tasked with regulating the public screening of films under the provisions of the Motion Picture Ordinance, 1979.

== Newspapers, news channels, and magazines ==
In 1947, only four major Muslim-owned newspapers existed in the area now called Pakistan: Pakistan Times, Zamindar, Nawa-i-Waqt, and Civil-Military Gazette. A number of Muslim papers and their publishers moved to Pakistan, including Dawn, which began publishing daily in Karachi in 1947, the Morning News, and the Urdu-language dailies Jang and Anjam. By the early 2000s, 1,500 newspapers and journals existed in Pakistan.

In the early 21st century, as in the rest of the world, the number of print outlets in Pakistan declined precipitously, but total circulation numbers increased. From 1994 to 1997, the total number of daily, monthly, and other publications increased from 3,242 to 4,455, but had dropped to just 945 by 2003 with most of the decline occurring in the Punjab Province. However, from 1994 to 2003 total print circulation increased substantially, particularly for dailies (3 million to 6.2 million). And after the low point in 2003 the number of publications grew to 1279 in 2004, to 1997 in 2005, 1467 in 2006, 1820 in 2007, and 1199 in 2008.

When it comes to magazines more specifically, between 2007 and 2015, the number of magazines published in Pakistan also experienced a significant decline, dropping from 1,383 to 232, according to data from the Pakistan Bureau of Statistics. This reduction reflects broader challenges faced by the print media industry during that period. It has been observed that standalone magazines in Pakistan generally perform less successfully than those affiliated with daily newspapers. One contributing factor to the overall decline of magazines is their relatively higher production cost, as they often require more specialized writers and higher-quality advertising. These factors necessitate higher cover prices, which can be difficult to sustain in the local market. However, fashion magazines have largely managed to avoid this decline and continue to maintain a stable readership.

Newspapers and magazines are published in 11 languages; most in Urdu and Sindhi, but English-language publications are numerous.

Since the Soviet–Afghan War there has also been a presence of jihadi material in the print media : Muhammad Amir Rana estimates that "until 1989, the number of jihad publications in Pakistan had reached 150", while in 1990 "around 100 jihad monthlies and 12 weeklies were being published in Peshawar, Quetta and Islamabad", in many languages, as "25 were in Urdu, 50 in Pashtu and Persian, 12 in Arabic and 10 in English", with Kashmiri militant groups alone publishing some 22 periodicals in 1994.

Most print media are privately owned, but the government controls the Associated Press of Pakistan, one of the major news agencies. From 1964 into the early 1990s, the National Press Trust acted as the government's front to control the press. The state, however, no longer publishes daily newspapers; the former Press Trust sold or liquidated its newspapers and magazines in the early 1990s.

Web news channels also appeared from mostly after 2010.

== Press Council and newspaper regulation ==
Prior to 2002, news agencies in Pakistan were completely unregulated. Established under the Press Council of Pakistan Ordinance in October 2002, the body operates on a semi-autonomous nature along with an Ethical Code of Practice signed by President Musharraf. It is mandated with multi-faceted tasks that range from protection of press freedom to regulatory mechanisms and review of complaints from the public.

However, the Press Council never came into operation due to the reservations of the media organisations. In protest over its establishment, the professional journalists organisations refrained from nominating their four members to the council. Nevertheless, the chairman was appointed, offices now exist and general administration work continues. This has led the government to review the entire Press Council mechanism.

The Press Council Ordinance has a direct link to the Press, Newspapers, News Agencies and Books Registration Ordinance (PNNABRO) of 2002. This legislation deals with procedures for registration of publications of criteria of media ownerships.

Among the documents required for the permit or 'Declaration' for publishing a newspaper is a guarantee from the editor to abide by the Ethical Code of Practice contained in the Schedule to the Press Council of Pakistan Ordinance. Though the Press Council procedure has made silenced or paralysed, these forms of interlinking laws could provide the government with additional means for imposing restrictions and take draconian actions against newspapers. The PNNABRO, among many other requirements demands that a publisher provides his bank details. It also has strict controls and regulations for the registering procedure. It not only demands logistical details, but also requires detailed information on editors and content providers.

Ownership of publications (mainly newspapers and news agencies) is restricted to Pakistani nationals if special government permission is not given. In partnerships, foreign involvement cannot exceed 25 percent. The law does not permit foreigners to obtain a 'Declaration' to run a news agency or any media station.

== News agencies ==
Pakistan's major news agencies include:

- Asia News Network
- The Asian Wire
- Associated Press of Pakistan
- Dispatch News Desk
- Independent News Pakistan
- News Network International
- Online News
- Pakistan Press International
- South Asian Broadcasting Agency (SABAH)
- International Press Pakistan (IPP)
- Pakistan News Agency (PNA)
- International Press Agency (IPA)
- Target News Network International (TNNI)

== See also ==
- Pakistan Federal Union of Journalists
- Council of Pakistan Newspaper Editors
- Pakistan Press Foundation
- Telecommunications in Pakistan
- Internet in Pakistan
- Censorship in Pakistan
- Internet censorship in Pakistan
- The Voice of Youth, Pakistani youth network

== Bibliography ==
- From Terrorism to Television: Dynamics of Media, State, and Society in Pakistan. United Kingdom, Taylor & Francis, 2020.
