= Pakistan Press Foundation =

The Pakistan Press Foundation (PPF) was established in 1967 as a non-profit organisation by the news agency Pakistan Press International and operated until 1974, when it had to suspend operations due to the political environment then prevailing in the country. It was reactivated in 1992 and has since been involved in assisting in the development of independent media in Pakistan by conducting training programmes for journalists, carrying out projects in research and documentation, and campaigning to defend and promote freedom of the press.

== Training programs ==
PPF regularly organizes training programs and seminars on issues facing the Pakistani media. The organization has worked for the improvement of professional skills, and in helping to raise journalists’ awareness of professional, social, political and human-rights issues. In December 2016, a survey in Pakistan was conducted by Pakistan Press Foundation that had found that the Pakistani news media allots 30pc of its news coverage to political news and only 1.5pc to human rights issues. This survey was done to bring attention to human rights issues by the government so it could address human rights violations.

== Collaboration with other organizations ==
The PPF collaborates with many local and international organizations, including the Council of Pakistan Newspaper Editors (CPNE), All Pakistan Newspapers Society (APNS), Asia Foundation, Panos South Asia, IFEX, Free Voice, UNESCO, Commonwealth Press Union (CPU), Friedrich Ebert Stiftung (FES), Thomson Foundation, the British Council, Knight International Foundation, National Endowment for Democracy, European Union, Freedom Forum, World Press Freedom Committee (WPFC), Asian Media Information and Communication Centre (AMIC), Council of Asian-Pacific Press Institutes (CAPPI) and the Asia-Pacific Communication Network.

In addition to capacity building, the PPF is committed to the promotion of freedom of the press in Pakistan. PPF organizes training programmes on press freedom, the rights of journalists and on journalistic ethics. PPF has played a leading role in promoting the use of recently introduced access to information laws and in lobbying for improvement of these laws. PPF also works to make the harassment of journalists and news organizations politically and socially unacceptable. The foundation produces PPF Newsflash, a service designed to highlight threats to press freedom in the country. PPF also coordinates financial support for victimized journalists.

In 1999, the PPF established the PPF-Vicky Zeitlin Media Library and Training Centre, which houses an extensive collection of publications on the media and issues of interest to the Pakistani media. Training workshops and seminars are regularly held at the training centre. Since 2017, PPF has provided training to more than 120 journalists.

== Human rights issues ==
The PPF is involved in research and documentation on mass communication and human rights issues in Pakistan. The weekly PPF Media Review, in English and Urdu, compiles important news about the media. PPF is also involved in producing manuals and handbooks on journalism in Urdu and Sindhi.

== Monitoring election campaigns for violations ==
Pakistan Press Foundation also monitors campaigns by the Pakistani political parties to gauge whether they have become too negative against each other and are not focusing on real issues facing the public. PPF also makes Election Commission of Pakistan (ECP) aware of violations of ECP prescribed 'Code of Conduct for Media' by the newspapers and TV channels in the country and 'Code of Conduct for Political Parties' by the Pakistani political parties during the election campaigns.

Pakistan Press Foundation encourages the Pakistani public to report to it any attacks against media people or journalistic organizations so it can make Election Commission of Pakistan aware of them. This policy was followed by PPF during the Pakistani general election, 2018.
