= M.A. Zuberi =

Pakistani journalist and media mogul

M. A. Zuberi SI
- محمد احمد زبيرى
- Born: Muhammad Ahmed Zuberi; 2 July 1920; Marehra, United Provinces, British India
- Died: 12 December 2010 (aged 90); Karachi, Pakistan
- Citizenship: British Indian (1920–1947); Pakistani (1947 onwards)
- Known for: Founder of Business Recorder; Editor-in-chief Business Recorder (1965 - 2010); Patron of Aaj News; Founding member and president of Council of Pakistan Newspaper Editors; Senior assistant editor at Dawn (1945 - 1965)
- Spouse: Sultana Jamil
- Children: 5, including Wamiq Zuberi, Arshad Zuberi, and Asif Zuberi
- Awards: Sitara-i-Imtiaz (Star of Excellence) Award by the President of Pakistan in 2003; Gold Mercury International Award (Italy)

Notes
- Pakistan Movement activist

Muhammad Ahmed Zuberi (2 July 1920 – 12 December 2010) also known as Muhammad Aziz Zuberi, and M. A. Zuberi, was a Pakistani journalist who was the founder and editor-in-chief of the Pakistani financial and business daily newspaper, Business Recorder.

Zuberi was considered to be a pioneer of economic and financial journalism in Pakistan.

== Early life ==
Muhammad Ahmed Zuberi was born on 2 July 1920 at Marehra, United Provinces, British India.

== Career ==
Zuberi began his career by joining Dawn newspaper, then the official newspaper of the All-India Muslim League, in December 1945 in Delhi, at the request of Muhammad Ali Jinnah and worked for this newspaper for 20 years in different capacities.

After the independence of Pakistan in 1947, when Dawn newspaper started publication from Karachi, Zuberi started working there as a senior sub-editor.

After retirement from Dawn newspaper, he fulfilled his lifelong dream of launching a financial newspaper, Business Recorder in 1965, also based in Karachi. This was the country's first newspaper dedicated to news coverage of finance and economy. It was well received by the public and its readership kept growing as years went by.

Zuberi also was a founding member of the Council of Pakistan Newspaper Editors (CPNE). During his long career in journalism, he represented Pakistan at different international forums – Commonwealth Press Union, United Nations and the World Bank. He was also patron-in-chief of the TV channel Aaj News and AAJ TV.

== Awards and recognition ==
- Sitara-i-Imtiaz (Star of Excellence) Award in journalism by the President of Pakistan in 2003.

== Death and legacy ==
Zuberi died on 12 December 2010 at age 90 in Karachi, Pakistan. He is buried in the compound of Abdullah Shah Ghazi Graveyard at Clifton, Karachi.

A well-known Pakistani journalist Majeed Nizami reportedly said, "He was a renowned journalist who had always worked for developing media with strong commitment to the etics. The country had lost a man who would always remain part of the country's cherished history of journalism".

Veteran Pakistani journalist and newspaper founder Arif Nizami paid him a tribute, after his death in 2010:

"Mr. Zuberi was a pillar of journalism and was the last of the journalists who worked with Mr. Jinnah in the Pakistan Movement".

According to Gold Mercury International (an Italian organization), "He was an innovator in the fields of economic and financial journalism in Pakistan".
