= Mujeeb-ur-Rehman Shami =

Pakistani journalist, columnist

HI TI Mujeeb-ur-Rehman Shami
- مجیب شامی
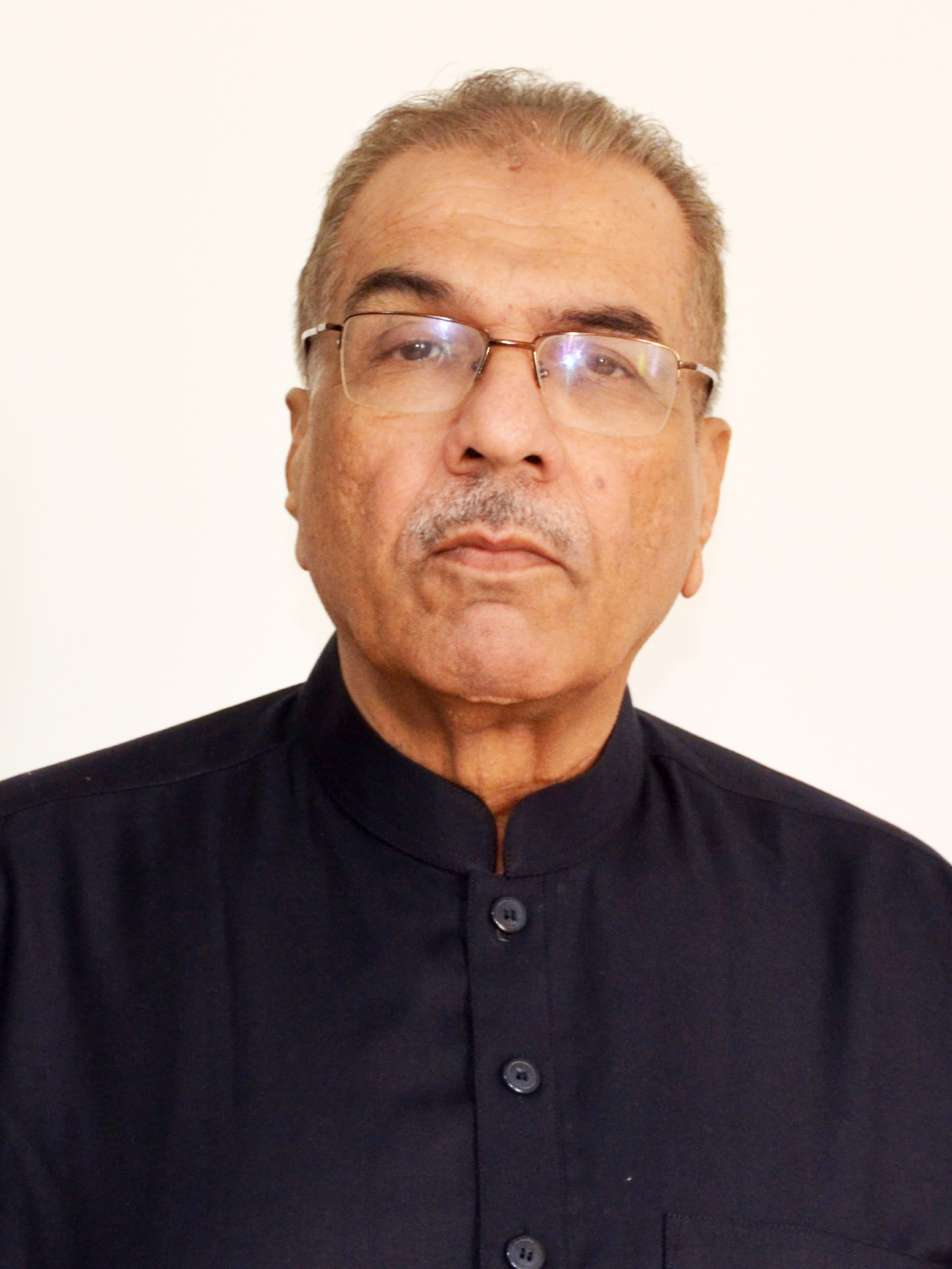
- Born: 14 August 1945 (age 80)
- Occupations: Journalist; columnist
- Office: Chief Editor Daily Pakistan
- Awards: Hilal-i-Imtiaz in 2023; Tamgha-i-Imtiaz in 1993

Mujeeb-ur-Rehman Shami is a Pakistani journalist and columnist who is the chief editor of Daily Pakistan newspaper. He belongs to a Punjabi Shaikh family.

He appears on the talk show Nuqta e Nazar on Dunya News. He is also the founder of Zindagi Magazine and Qaumi Digest.

His columns are published in Daily Dunya and Daily Pakistan every Sunday. He has also written newspaper columns for the Urdu language daily newspapers Nawa-i-Waqt and Daily Jang.

== Positions held in journalism bodies ==
- President and Secretary General of the Council of Pakistan Newspaper Editors (CPNE) (elected multiple times)
- President of All Pakistan Newspapers Society (APNS)
- President of the South Asia Free Media Association (SAFMA's Pakistan chapter)

== Awards and recognition ==
- Hilal-i-Imtiaz (Crescent of Excellence), award by the Government of Pakistan in 2023.
- Tamgha-i-Imtiaz (Medal of Excellence), award by the President of Pakistan in 1993.
