= Associated Press of Pakistan =

News agency

- مشارکتِ مطبع ، پاکستان
- Abbreviation: APP
- Formation: 1949; 77 years ago
- Type: News agency
- Headquarters: Islamabad
- Location: Pakistan
- Region served: Worldwide
- Owner: Government of Pakistan
- Key people: Muhammad Asim (Managing Director)
- Parent organization: Ministry of Information & Broadcasting
- Staff: see below
- Website: www.app.com.pk

Associated Press of Pakistan (APP; Urdu: مشارکتِ مطبع ، پاکستان) is a government-operated national news agency of Pakistan. Established in 1949, it is headquartered in Islamabad.

APP has News Exchange Agreements with 37 Foreign News Agencies and has "around 400 editorial staff including around 100 Correspondents at the District and Tehsil levels".

== History ==
=== Antecedents ===
The news agency called Associated Press of India (API) was formed in British India in 1905 and was acquired by Reuters in 1915. In the 1940s, Reuters altered its constitution enabling co-partnership of news agencies in British Dominions, and the Associated Press of India became an independent company in 1946, though with significant backing by Reuters.

After the Partition of India in August 1947, API continued to function for more than a year. Some Indian journalists such as G. K. Reddy worked in Pakistani areas. In 1948, the Indian press formed the Press Trust of India to take over the operations of API, which occurred in September 1948. In January 1949, the Pakistani operations were reorganised as a Reuters subsidiary under the name "Associated Press of Pakistan". In September 1949, company was transferred to national control.

=== Initial years ===
The APP was organised as a trust, with the Chief Justice of Pakistan serving as the chairman of the board of trustees. The remaining members of the board were elected on two-year terms. The newly-formed country's press was economically weak, and was unable to financially support the agency. APP instead received financial support from the Government of Pakistan. APP then subscribed to the services of the world's news agencies and to opened offices in major cities of Pakistan.

=== Government take-over ===
The financial situation of APP continued to deteriorate until it was on the verge of collapse. This was a direct result of the withholding of payment of funds from the Government of Pakistan due towards APP from the Ministry of Information and Broadcasting in an effort to create a financial crisis for the national news agency. In the early 1960s, APP owed about Rs. 8 lakhs (Rupees 800,000) to the government's Post and Telegraph Department and another Rs. 12 lakhs (Rupees 1200,000) in unpaid subscription fees to foreign news agencies. The Government of Pakistan intervened and took over the agency on 15 July 1961 following the instructions of certain vested interests within the Government of Pakistan. A government ordinance was issued for it. The given reason was to strengthen APP's financial foundation.

The takeover initiated a number of changes: A K Qureshi, a senior government officer with some journalistic experience, was hired as Administrator of APP. The head office of the agency was shifted to Islamabad, the new capital of Pakistan. APP was directed by the government at this time and also by later governments to carry just the official version of political events. A K Qureshi was a member of the ill-fated National Press Trust delegation traveling to London by PIA Flight 705 that crashed at Cairo on 20 May 1965. He is buried in a mass grave at Cairo alongside his fellow passengers: victims of Pakistan's first jet aircraft disaster.

Up until the early 1970s, APP had been supplying news from Reuters and United Press International. Later, it started providing news from also Agence France-Presse and the Associated Press.

In 2015, Information Minister Pervaiz Rashid and a three-member committee had conducted interviews of 18 candidates for the position of Managing Director of Associated Press of Pakistan to be able to finally appoint a Managing Director.

== Editorial operation ==
The APP head office operates in Islamabad. Additionally, APP maintains five bureaus at Karachi, Lahore, Peshawar Quetta and Rawalpindi and eight news centres at Sukkur, Multan, Quetta, Faisalabad, Larkana, Hyderabad, Muzaffarabad, Sialkot and now Gilgit-Baltistan.

=== Communication networks ===
Despite APP being considered Pakistan's "premier" news agency, for decades the agency ran on old, obsolete and unreliable equipment. News copy was being carried on a 50-baud duplex circuit between Islamabad, Karachi and Lahore.

M. Aftab, APPs General-Manager in 1991, undertook to improve the agency's technical resources. The resulting upgrade saw a transformation of data output speed from 50 words per minute (WMP) to 1200 WPM, most of which is now directly fed into the computers of the subscribers simultaneously throughout Pakistan and overseas.

=== Subscribers ===
APP collects and disseminate domestic and international news to 84 (1992) newspapers of Pakistan besides radio, television and government offices and some foreign media. APP's subscription rates are higher than other agencies in Pakistan, due to its credibility and services. For this reason every newspaper in Pakistan tries to subscribe to its services. Notable newspaper subscribers to APP's services include: Dawn, Pakistan Times, Frontier Post, The Statesman, The Nation, The News International, Business Recorder, The Observer, The Post and Nawa-i-Waqt, Jang, Khabrain, Daily Express (Urdu newspaper), The Express Tribune and some other English and Urdu national newspapers.

== Management and financing ==
APP is a government organisation, responsible to the Ministry of Information and Broadcasting. The agency is headed by a Director-General, appointed by the Ministry. Also it has a Managing Director (MD) of APP, appointed by the government.

Since the government takeover, APP has continued with an undefined status – neither an official government body nor an independent news outfit, APP has drawn criticism as a mouthpiece for the government of the day. In 1998, however, a Bill was proposed to convert APP into a corporation. On 19 October 2002 an Ordinance converted APP into a corporation and renamed it Associated Press of Pakistan Corporation (APPC).

Due to this unclear status, there is no long-term financing in place for APP, with allocations being made on an annual basis by the Ministry of Information and Broadcasting. APP's annual expenditure is now placed at Rs. 140 million. APP generates 60% of its revenue from the government, and the remainder is raised through subscription from electronic media including television and radio and newspapers as well as foreign news agencies, business and non-media subscribers.

== Services provided by APP ==
=== News service ===
Pakistan has two major news agencies: Associated Press of Pakistan and Pakistan Press International.

The APP News Service is mainly divided into three main areas: official, political and district news.

==== Official news ====
APP provides detailed coverage of the activities and statements of government dignitaries. Newspapers and the government-controlled radio and television rely heavily on APP for government news. According to renowned journalist Zamir Niazi:

"Most of the time and energy of APP since the days of Ayub Khan is being consumed in creeding long speeches of the president and other ministries, the rest are allocated to the government press notes and other lesser government functionaries."

==== Political & Other news ====
Being the government agency, APP mainly focuses on government news, besides promoting cultural, social, economic and other sectors of national life. The organisation is well known for its credibility, as being a state owned news agency it has to demonstrate it indeed.

APP also gives coverage to opposition leaders and parties in center and at provincial level but keeping in view its policy and as allow by the federal government.

==== District news ====
APP's district news service is not highly regarded, as its resources are so thinly placed across the country that most of the information from this department comes from government information officers.

=== Foreign news ===
APP has become the main source of international news for the Pakistani media. The agency subscribes to Reuters, AFP, and the Associated Press of America (AP). United Press International was also linked with APP, but the agreement was allowed to lapse.

APP has co-operation agreements with some 35 news agencies, mainly in third world countries. Under these agreements, news is exchanged on a barter basis. Prominent among these are the Islamic Republic News Agency (IRNA), the Press Trust of India, and MENA (Egypt).

=== Commercial service ===
The commercial service of APP provides currency and commodity rates from Reuters, financial and economic services, banks and large business houses. APP planned to expand this service, but suffered a setback in the mid-1980s when Reuters bypassed APP and began to sell its financial services directly to business houses and newspapers in Pakistan.

=== Photo service ===
APP has its own photographic section equipped with photo receivers and photo transmitters in Karachi, Lahore, Islamabad and Quetta respectively. Islamabad is the head office to receive photographs from within Pakistan and aboard, and transmits them to the agency's bureaux and stations which distribute them to local newspapers.

=== Urdu service ===
The agency's Urdu language service started in the 1980s to cater for the needs of the growing number of Urdu language dailies in Pakistan. The idea behind the setting-up of the service was to avoid errors and ensure accuracy. As a practice, Urdu speech was often translated into English by the APP and then back into Urdu by newspaper editor – greatly increasing the chances of translation, emphasis or context errors. The Urdu Service, while still small, has been effective in producing text in both languages.

==== Feature & Write Up Service ====
APP editorial staff regularly contribute English and Urdu feature and write ups on socio-economic issues including education, health, business which are well carried by national dailies.

==== Video News Service ====
The Visual News Service (VNS)was launches during 2007 with a special focus to provide electronic news coverage of President, Prime Minister, Parliament House to private media national and international channels The project was initiated on an idea to launch APP's own news channel but financial restraints have hindered the idea and confined it to VNS service only.The Director of VNS is Ch Rubnawaz Bajwa senior grade one officer.

== Bibliography ==
- News Agencies: Their Structure and Operation (PDF), UNESCO, 1953
