= Censorship in Pakistan =

The Pakistani Constitution limits Censorship in Pakistan, but allows "reasonable restrictions in the interests of the sovereignty and integrity of Pakistan or public order or morality". Press freedom in Pakistan is limited by official censorship that restricts critical reporting and by the high level of violence against journalists. The armed forces, the judiciary, and religion are topics that frequently attract the government's attention.

The OpenNet Initiative listed Internet filtering in Pakistan as substantial in the social and conflict/security areas, as selective in the Internet tools area, and as suspected in the political area in December 2010. In 2019, The National Assembly Standing Committee on Information Technology and Telecom was informed by Pakistan Telecommunication Authority (PTA) that 900,000 URLs were blocked in Pakistan for "reasons such as carrying blasphemous and pornographic content and/or sentiments against the state, judiciary or the armed forces."

In July 2025, an Islamabad court banned 27 YouTube channels for allegedly spreading “anti-state” and “false” content. The move, widely criticized as a crackdown on dissent, targeted independent journalists like Matiullah Jan, Ahmad Noorani, Asad Ali Toor, Moeed Pirzada, and Imran Riaz Khan many known for criticizing the military and establishment.

Journalist Arzoo Kazmi, whose channel was also banned, called it an attempt to silence Imran Khan supporters, despite not being one herself. Critics see the ban as part of a broader effort by the Pakistani government and military to suppress opposition voices and restrict freedom of speech, particularly online, as mainstream media faces increasing control.

== Overview ==
Pakistan is a Muslim-majority country. Hence, it has several pro-Muslim laws in its Constitution. Freedom House ranked Pakistan 134th out of 196 countries in its 2010 Freedom of the Press Survey. Pakistan's score was 61 on a scale from 1 (most free) to 100 (least free), which earned a status of "not free".

Reporters Without Borders put Pakistan 145 out of the 180 countries ranked in its 2020 Press Freedom Index. A previous report by RSF in 2010 named Pakistan as one of "ten countries where it is not good to be a journalist". It said:

... in Afghanistan, Pakistan, Somalia and Mexico, countries either openly at war or in a civil war or some other kind of internal conflict, we see a situation of permanent chaos and a culture of violence and impunity taking root in which the press has become a favorite target. These are among the most dangerous countries in the world, and the belligerents there pick directly on reporters ....

And the "Close-up on Asia" section of the same report, goes on to say:

In Afghanistan (147th) and in Pakistan (151st), Islamist groups bear much of the responsibility for their country's pitifully low ranking. Suicide bombings and abductions make working as a journalist an increasingly dangerous occupation in this area of South Asia. And the State has not slackened its arrests of investigative journalists, which sometimes more closely resemble kidnappings.

Newspapers, television, and radio are regulated by the Pakistan Electronic Media Regulatory Authority (PEMRA), which occasionally halts broadcasts and closes media outlets. Publication or broadcast of “anything which defames or brings into ridicule the head of state, or members of the armed forces, or executive, legislative or judicial organs of the state,” as well as any broadcasts deemed to be “false or baseless” can bring jail terms of up to three years, fines of up to 10 million rupees (US$165,000), and license cancellation. The Blasphemy law can bring fines and prison sentences of up to three years, while defiling the Quran requires imprisonment for life, and defaming Muhammad requires a death sentence.

While some journalists practice self-censorship, a wide range of privately owned daily and weekly newspapers and magazines provide diverse and critical coverage of national affairs. The government controls the Pakistan Television (PTV) and Radio Pakistan, the only free-to-air broadcast outlets with a national reach, and predictably coverage supports official viewpoints. Private radio stations operate in some major cities, but are prohibited from broadcasting news programming. At least 25 private all-news cable and satellite television channels—such as Geo, ARY, Aaj, and Dawn, some of which broadcast from outside the country—provide domestic news coverage, commentary, and call-in talk shows. International television and radio broadcasts are usually available, with the important exception of a complete blockade of Indian television news channels.

Authorities sometimes exert control over media content through unofficial “guidance” to newspaper editors on placement of stories or topics than may be covered. It is not unheard of to pay for favorable press coverage, a practice that is exacerbated by the low salary levels of many journalists.

The government continues to restrict and censor some published material. Foreign books need to pass government censors before being reprinted. Books and magazines can be imported freely, but are subject to censorship for objectionable sexual or religious content. Obscene literature, a category the government defines broadly, is subject to seizure. Showing Indian films in Pakistan was banned starting with the 1965 war between the two countries until 2008 when the ban was partially lifted.

== History ==
On 22 April 2007 PEMRA threatened the private television channel AaJ TV with closure for airing news, talk shows, and other programs that discussed the then current judicial crisis. PEMRA warned all private TV channels not to air programs casting aspersions on the judiciary or on the “integrity of the armed forces of Pakistan”, as well as content which would encourage and incite violence, contained anything against the maintenance of law and order, or which promoted anti-national or anti-state attitudes.

During March 2009 demonstrations demanding the reinstatement of Chief Justice Iftikhar Chaudhry, authorities temporarily shut down the cable service of Geo TV and Aaj TV in cities around the country.

In October 2009 four television news channels were blocked for several hours in the wake of a terrorist attack on the army headquarters in October 2009.

In 2009 conditions for reporters covering the ongoing conflict in the Federally Administered Tribal Areas (FATA) and parts of North West Frontier Province (NWFP) were particularly difficult, as correspondents were detained, threatened, expelled, or otherwise prevented from working, either by the Taliban and local tribal groups or by the army and intelligence services. Following the takeover of the Swat Valley by Islamic militants, cable television broadcasting was banned. During two major military offensives during the year—against Taliban-affiliated militants in the Swat Valley in April and the South Waziristan tribal area in October—reporters faced bans on access, pressure to report favorably on the offensives, and dozens of local journalists were forced to flee the area.

In August 2009, the Daily Asaap, Balochistan's widely circulated Urdu-language newspaper, suspended publication, citing harassment from the security forces. Two other newspapers in Balochistan, Daily Balochistan Express and Daily Azadi, also reported harassment by security forces.

In October 2009, PEMRA directed 15 FM radio stations to stop carrying British Broadcasting Corporation programs for "violation of the terms and conditions of their license".

During 2010 journalists were killed and subjected to physical attack, harassment, intimidation, and other forms of pressure, including:

- On July 7, the Taliban threw a grenade at the home of Din News television reporter Imran Khan in Bajaur, FATA, injuring eight members of his family. He and his sister had been hospitalized earlier for injuries sustained in a kidnapping attempt.
- On July 22, Sarfraz Wistro, the chief reporter of the Daily Ibrat newspaper, was attacked and beaten unconscious by five men near his home in Hyderabad, Sindh.
- On September 4, Umar Cheema—the senior member of the investigation cell of a leading media group, The News—was abducted and taken to an unknown location, where he was blindfolded and beaten, had his hair shaved off his head, and was hung upside down and tortured. His abductors threatened more torture if "he didn't mend his ways" and told him the editor of investigations, Ansar Abbassi, would be next. He was dropped outside of Islamabad six hours later. Cheema went public with the abuse, and The News covered his abduction in detail in print, as did television channels. Police filed a case immediately against the accused, the government formed a joint investigation team to probe the incident, and the Lahore High Court took notice of the case. As of year's end, and after nearly four months of investigation, the team had not issued any conclusive findings.
- On September 14, journalist Misri Khan was killed in Hangu District, Khyber Pakhtunkhwa, by militants from the TTP, who claimed that "he twisted facts whenever we gave him any reports" and "leaned towards the army."
- On September 16, journalist Mujeebur Rehman Saddiqui, a Daily Pakistan correspondent, was killed by gunmen in Dargai, Khyber Pakhtunkhwa.
- On November 18, the body of journalist Lala Hameed Baloch, who had been kidnapped in late October, was found along with the body of a second journalist, Hameed Ismail, with gunshot wounds outside of Turbat, Balochistan Province. Baloch's family, local journalists, and the Pakistan Federal Union of Journalists believed that he was seized by security officials and targeted for his political activism.

In October 2019, the People National Alliance organised a rally to free Kashmir from Pakistani rule. As a result of the police trying to stop the rally, 100 people were injured. In 2023, PEMRA directed news channels to refrain from reporting on people who propagate hate speech, a move that was widely understood to prevent them from reporting on Imran Khan.

== Film ==
On April 27, 2016 Maalik became the first Pakistani film to be banned by the federal government after being cleared with Universal rating by all three Censor Boards and running in cinemas for 18 days. Maalik is a 2016 Pakistani political thriller film made by Ashir Azeem. The film was released on 8 April 2016 in cinemas across Pakistan. The film extols the principle of government of the people, by the people and for the people. Maalik is the desire of a common Pakistani for freedom, democracy and justice in a country that has been hijacked by the feudal elites after the departure of the British from the subcontinent and who continues to rule and mismanage an impoverished nation, while amassing huge personal fortunes for themselves.

Although the film was banned in Pakistan by the federal government on April 27, 2016 for endangering democracy, its ban was later lifted and the film was re-released on limited screenings in Karachi, Lahore, and Islamabad.

The release of the film Zindagi Tamasha was suspended after religious uproar. Tehreek-e-Labbaik Pakistan's Khadim Hussain Rizvi promoted protests on the release of this film. Rizvi further accused Khoosat of blasphemy. The supposedly "blasphemous" material includes criticism of ulama and an alleged reference to bacha bazi.

=== Banned films ===
Date	Title	Notes
1980	The Blood of Hussain	Banned by General Zia ul-Haq, after he seized power in a coup de état in 1977, as the film portrays a fictional military coup in an unfavourable light.
2006	The Da Vinci Code	Banned because of blasphemous content.
2012	Agent Vinod	Banned by the Central Board of Film Censors of Pakistan, for containing various controversial references to the Pakistani spy agency Inter-Services Intelligence.
2016	Maalik	Banned by the Government of Pakistan.
2016	Sarabjit	Banned because of blasphemous content and excessive controversial depictions.
2023	Barbie	Initially banned in Punjab due to it containing objectionable content but it was rescinded.

== Internet ==
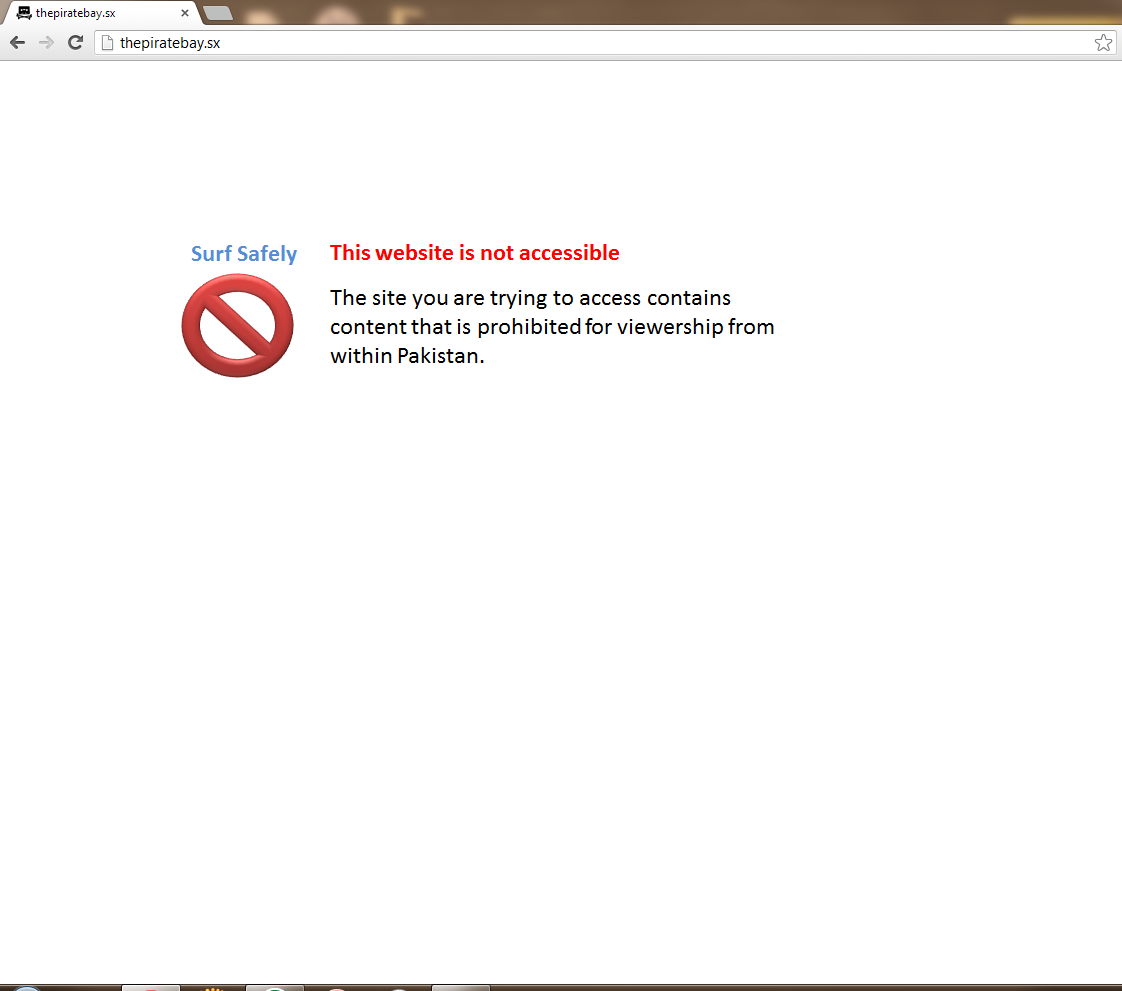
Internet users in Pakistan are prompted with this message when accessing blocked websites.

The OpenNet Initiative listed Internet filtering in Pakistan as substantial in the social and conflict/security areas, as selective in the Internet tools area, and as suspected in the political area in December 2010.

In late 2010 Pakistanis enjoyed generally unimpeded access to most sexual, political, social, and religious content on the Internet. Although the Pakistani government does not employ a sophisticated blocking system, a limitation which has led to collateral blocks on entire domains such as Blogspot.com and YouTube.com, it continues to block websites containing content it considers to be blasphemous, anti-Islamic, or threatening to internal security. Pakistan has blocked access to websites critical of the government or the military.

In 2019, The National Assembly Standing Committee on Information Technology and Telecom was informed by Pakistan Telecommunication Authority (PTA) that 900,000 URLs were blocked in Pakistan for "reasons such as carrying blasphemous and pornographic content and/or sentiments against the state, judiciary or the armed forces."

On January 31, 2024, PTA blocked access to a website called FactFocus on the grounds that the website was hosting content "to ridicule, defame the Armed Forces." However, according to FactFocus, the website was blocked on account of its investigative reports on elections that were due to be published.

In February 2024, Internet services were temporarily restricted across Pakistan’s southwestern Balochistan province ahead of elections.

=== Maps of Kashmir/Junagadh ===
In 2022, the Pakistani government will propose to criminalise questions related to the sovereign territorial integrity of the frontiers of Pakistan in a manner that is, or should likely to be, prejudicial to the interests of the safety or security concerns of Pakistanis. Pakistan’s PTI government will require that all maps in publications circulated in Pakistan reflect the traditional claim to the entire region of Indian administered Jammu and Kashmir, which is disputed and contested by Islamabad, and regardless of the line of control respectively. Pakistan's government has maintained its territorial claim on Junagadh, along with Manavadar and Sir Creek in Gujarat, on its official political map issued on 4 August 2020. According to the Surveying and Mapping Act.

== SMS ==
The Pakistan Telecommunication Authority required telecoms to filter Short Message Service (text messaging) for more than 1,000 offensive keywords from 21 November 2011. An unconfirmed list was leaked online and some of the innocuous keywords on the list was subjected to ridicule by Pakistanis.

== See also ==
- Constitution of Pakistan
- Freedom of speech in Pakistan
- Freedom of the press in Pakistan
- Human rights in Pakistan
- Internet Censorship in Pakistan
- Internet in Pakistan
- Media in Pakistan
- Pakistan Telecommunication Authority
- Pakistan Electronic Media Regulatory Authority
