= Altaf Hassan Qureshi =

Pakistani journalist and author (1932–2026)

- الطاف حسن قریشی
- Born: Altaf Hassan Qureshi; 3 March 1932; Hisar district, Punjab Province, British India
- Died: 16 May 2026 (aged 94); Lahore, Punjab, Pakistan
- Occupations: Journalist; author; editor
- Years active: 1959–2026
- Awards: Sitara-i-Imtiaz; Life Time Achievement Award from APNS and CPNE

Altaf Hassan Qureshi (Urdu: الطاف حسن قریشی; 3 March 1932 – 16 May 2026) was a Pakistani Urdu journalist, political analyst, author and editor-in-chief of monthly Urdu Digest.

== Early life and education ==
Qureshi was born on 3 March 1932 in Hisar district, Punjab Province, British India. He migrated to Pakistan in 1947 and settled in Lahore. He got his master's degree in political science from University of Punjab.

== Career ==
Qureshi's elder brother Ejaz Hassan Qureshi had launched Urdu Digest in 1959, and he took the responsibility of being its first editor. He has been doing the editorial job for the digest to date. Besides Urdu Digest, Qureshi also penned columns in Urdu newspapers like Jang and others.

Qureshi started his career as a journalist when the ideological conflict between Communists and Islamists was at its peak in the 1960s and 1970s. He and his brother joined the right-wing camp and backed the religious forces working for an Islamic political system in Pakistan. He has been influenced by the writings of Abul A'la Maududi, a revolutionary Islamic scholar. He and his brother were jailed several times by the governments due to their opposing views and writings. His political analyses during the East Pakistan separation movement, after the military coups, and on other critical national events got the attention of every school of thought in the country.

== Death ==
Qureshi died in Lahore on 16 May 2026, at the age of 94.

== Books ==
- Mulaqaatein
- Jang e Setambar Ki Yaadein (Memories of Indo-Pakistani War of 1965)
- Muqabil Hai Aaina
- Chhay Nukaat Ki Sachi Tasveer (Views on Six point movement)
- Mazeed Mulaqaatein
- Mulaqaatein Kaya Kaya (Interviews of different famous personalities)
- Nouk e Zaban

== Awards ==
Qureshi is recipient of the following awards:

- Sitara-i-Imtiaz from government of Pakistan
- Life Time Achievement Award from All Pakistan Newspapers Society and Council of Pakistan Newspaper Editors
