= Sangla Hill Tehsil =

Sangla Hill Tehsil تحصيل سانگلہ ہل ضلع ننکانہ صاحب تحصيل سانگلا ہل ضلع ننکانہ صاحب
- Tehsil
- Location within Punjab, Pakistan Location within Pakistan
- Coordinates: 31°42′48″N 73°22′28″E
- Country: Pakistan
- Province: Punjab
- District: Nankana Sahib
- Headquarter: Sangla Hill

Area
  - Tehsil: 223 km^{2} (86 sq mi)

Population (2023)
  - Tehsil: 269,993
  - Density: 1,210/km^{2} (3,140/sq mi)
  - Urban: 103,709 (38.41%)
  - Rural: 166,284 (61.59%)

Sangla Hill is a tehsil in the Nankana Sahib District of the Punjab Province of Pakistan.

== Demographics ==
Historical population
Year	Pop.	±% p.a.
1951	...	—
1961	...	—
1972	...	—
1981	...	—
1998	...	—
2017	227,604	—
2023	269,993	+2.89%

== Education ==
=== Colleges ===
- Government Islamia Graduate College Sangla Hill
- Jinnah Polytechnic Institute

=== Schools ===
- Dar-e-Arqam Schools

== Notable people ==
- Chaudhry Tariq Mehmood Bajwa
- Hamid Nizami
- Barjees Tahir

== See also ==
- Divisions of Pakistan
  - Divisions of Punjab
- Districts of Pakistan
  - Districts of Punjab
- Tehsils of Pakistan
  - Tehsils of Punjab
