= Muhammad Ziauddin =

Pakistani journalist, economist, and historian (1938–2021)

- محمد ضیاء الدین
- Born: 1938; Madras, British Raj
- Died: 29 November 2021 (aged 82–83); Islamabad, Pakistan
- Education: University of Dhaka; University of Karachi
- Occupations: Journalist, economist and historian
- Writing career
- Years active: 1964–2021

Muhammad Ziauddin (Urdu: محمد ضیاء الدین; 1938 – 29 November 2021) was a Pakistani journalist, economist and historian.

== Early life and education ==
Muhammad Ziauddin was born in 1938 in Madras, British India. In 1952, his family migrated to Dhaka in the then-East Pakistan. He obtained a bachelor's degree in pharmacy from the University of Dhaka before relocating to Karachi in 1960, where he pursued a master's degree in journalism at the University of Karachi, which he completed in 1964.

== Career ==
=== Early career ===
Ziauddin began his career in 1964 as a reporter for Pakistan Press International. In 1974, he joined the weekly Pakistan Economist, where he began specialising in finance and economic reporting, and by 1976 he had become assistant editor of the Morning News.

In 1978, Ziauddin moved to Islamabad to join The Muslim as part of the newspaper's founding team, later serving as its commerce editor. During General Zia ul-Haq's military rule, he was barred from writing on political affairs owing to his critical views of the establishment. He briefly served as a visiting lecturer in the journalism department of the University of Karachi in 1977.

=== Dawn ===
Ziauddin's longest professional association was with Dawn, which he joined in 1982 as an economy reporter. The following year, he received the All Pakistan Newspapers Society (APNS) award in the best investigative story category for his report "The untold story of IMF conditions", which was among the first to publicly disclose the terms attached to Pakistan's programme with the International Monetary Fund. He was appointed bureau chief of Dawn in Islamabad in 1990 and held the position for the next eleven years. In March 2001, following the launch of the newspaper's Islamabad edition, he became its first resident editor, during which time the paper introduced its Economic and Business Review pages, later restyled as Business and Finance.

After a brief period in 1994 as editor of The News International in Rawalpindi, from which he departed within months over editorial differences with the management, Ziauddin returned to Dawn. He continued as resident editor in Islamabad until 2005 and subsequently served as the paper's London correspondent between 2006 and 2009.

While in London in 2007, Ziauddin questioned then-president of Pakistan Pervez Musharraf on the security of Pakistan's nuclear assets during a talk at a think tank, prompting the general to publicly call him a "traitor" and later, while addressing a gathering of overseas Pakistanis, to encourage them to physically assault Ziauddin if they encountered him.

=== The Express Tribune ===
On returning to Pakistan, Ziauddin joined The Express Tribune at its inception in 2009 as its executive editor, a post he held until July 2014. He oversaw the launch of three print editions and an online edition of the newspaper. After stepping down, he continued writing a weekly column for the paper.

=== Union and advocacy work ===
Ziauddin was elected assistant secretary general of the Pakistan Federal Union of Journalists (PFUJ) in 1982–83 and was known for his participation in journalists' protests over the implementation of wage board awards and issues relating to press freedom. He served as president of the South Asia Free Media Association (SAFMA) between 2002 and 2006, an organisation established to promote networking, professional standards and journalist exchanges across South Asia. At the time of his death, he was chairperson of the Trust for Democratic Education and Advocacy and a board member of the Aurat Foundation.

== Awards and recognition ==
In 2014, Reporters Without Borders (RSF) named Ziauddin among its "100 Information Heroes" to mark World Press Freedom Day.
