= Press Council of Pakistan =

Pakistani government journalism organisation

- Urdu: شورای پریس پاکستان
- Abbreviation: PCP
- Type: Federal government agency
- Legal status: active
- Professional title: Journalism ethics and standards
- Location: Islamabad Capital Territory, Pakistan
- Fields: Journalism
- Members: Retired judges of the Supreme Court of Pakistan; All Pakistan Newspapers Society; Council of Pakistan Newspaper Editors; Pakistan Bar Council; Higher Education Commission; National Assembly of Pakistan
- Official language: Urdu, English
- Focal Person: Faisal Bin Naseer
- Chairman: Muhammad Arshad Khan Jadoon
- Affiliations: Ministry of Information & Broadcasting
- Website: presscouncil.org.pk

The Press Council of Pakistan (PCP) is a federal government agency of Pakistan responsible for maintaining the freedom of press, speech and expression for newspapers, editors, journalists, and news websites and agencies in the country. It also prevents violation of ethical code to maintain an independent press ecosystem. The agency is tasked with preventing fake news and review any development in journalism ethics and standards with prime focus on code of ethics in media.

It also prevents constitutional rights of the general public, in addition to implementing ethical code of practice with 17 points in journalism. It also receives complaints concerning violation of ethical code practice. It is tasked with to enforce ethical code practice across the country and to conduct inquiry through a commission appointed for hearings and decisions based on received-complaints.

== Press Council Ordinance, 2002 ==
The president of Pakistan in 2002 signed the Press Council of Pakistan Ordinance 2002 for the establishment a commission with 19 members for implementation of 17 points concerning ethical code regulated by the PCP. The ordinance is mandated with authority for suspension of declaration of any newspaper, agency, or journalism professionals or groups running in the country within the framework of the constitution of Pakistan.

=== Membership ===
Its chairperson is appointed by the president in his own discretion. However, nominated person should be a retired judge of the Supreme Court or with equivalent qualification. The council also nominate its 4 members from the All Pakistan Newspapers Society (APNS), 4 from the Council of Pakistan Newspaper Editors (CPNE) and 4 members from professional bodies of journalists. Vice-chairperson is nominated from Pakistan Bar Council, and one member is nominated any member of the Higher Education Commission and the National Assembly of Pakistan. Its membership also consists of an educationist associated with mass media who is formally nominated by the council. It also contains one female member from the National Commission on the Status of Women in Pakistan.
