= Sachi Baat SK Niazi k Sath =

- Genre: Political talk show
- Presented by: Sardar Khan Niazi
- Country of origin: Pakistan
- Original language: Urdu

Production
- Production location: Islamabad
- Running time: 60 minutes

Original release
- Network: Roze News
- Release: present

Sachi Baat SK Niazi k Sath is a flagship Roze News program which is a one-hour debate on current events hosted by Sardar Khan Niazi.

== See also ==
- The Daily Pakistan
