= Baroia Chak 36/R.B =

Settlement in Pakistan

Baroia Chak No. 36/R.B is a village located near Sangla Hill (Urdu: سانگلہ ہِل), Nankana Sahib District of the Punjab, Pakistan. It lies roughly 104 kilometres (65 mi) from Lahore. Baroia has its own hockey and Cricket team. Govt boys and girls high school operate under government control and boys were able to go to good institutions later on.
