= Chak 31 RB Ruriana =

Coordinates: 31°45′16″N 73°35′42″E

Ruriana Chak No. 31 RB is a neighboring village of Sangla Hill, Nankana Sahib district, Pakistan.

== Economy ==
Farming is the main source of income for the village. Some seek employment abroad.

== Education ==
- Govt. Islah e Millat High School
- Govt. Primary School
- Govt. Girl's Middle School
- Sir Syed Model School

Some students have gone to Lahore and Faisalabad for their higher education.

== Health ==
No health facilities are available in the village, though a new animal hospital has opened.
