= Pakistan Electronic Media Regulatory Authority =

Government agency of Pakistan

Pakistan Electronic Media Regulatory Authority مُقتَدِرۂ ضابِطۂ بَرقی ذَرائعِ اِبلاغ پاکِستان

Agency overview
- Formed: 1 March 2002; 24 years ago
- Preceding agency: Ministry of Information, Broadcasting and National Heritage
- Jurisdiction: Pakistan
- Headquarters: Islamabad, Pakistan
- Motto: Improving the standards of Information, Education and Entertainment
- Agency executive: Muhammad Saleem Baig, Chairman
- Website: www.pemra.gov.pk

Pakistan Electronic Media Regulatory Authority (PEMRA) (Urdu: مُقتَدِرۂ ضابِطۂ بَرقی ذَرائعِ اِبلاغ پاکِستان 'Muqtadira-e Zabitah-e Barqi Zarai'e Iblagh Pakistan') is an independent and constitutionally established federal institution responsible for regulating and issuing channel licenses for establishment of the mass media culture, print and electronic media.

Codified under the Article 19: Chapter I of the Constitution of Pakistan, it has jurisdiction to impose reasonable restrictions in the interest of the religion, the integrity, national security of Pakistan. Established on 1 March 2002, Pemra's principal objectives are to facilitate and regulate the private electronic mass-media industry and to improve the standards of information, education and entertainment.

Its constitutional mandate is to enlarge the choice available to the people of Pakistan including news, current affairs, religious knowledge, art and culture as well as science and technology. On 28 June 2018 after the Supreme Court's order, Saleem Baig was appointed as the Chairman of PEMRA.

== Constitutional status and definition ==
The constitutional freedom of speech and press are highlighted in the Constitution of Pakistan. Under the Article 19 and Article 19A of Fundamental Rights in the Constitution of Pakistan. The Constitution grants PEMRA following powers:

1. Improve the standards of information, education and entertainment.
2. Enlarge the choice available to the people of Pakistan in the media for news, current affairs, religious knowledge, art, culture, science, technology, economic development, social sector concerns, music, sports, drama and other subjects of public and national interest.
3. Facilitate the devolution of responsibility and power to the grass roots by improving the access of the people to mass media at the local and community level.
4. Ensure accountability, transparency and good governance by optimization in the free flow of information.

Every citizen shall have the right to freedom of speech and expression, and there shall be freedom of the press, subject to any reasonable restrictions imposed by law in the interest of the glory of Islam or the integrity, security or defense of Pakistan or any part thereof, friendly relations with foreign States, public order, decency or morality, or in relation to contempt of court, [commission of] or incitement to an offence. Article 19(A)— Right to information: Every citizen shall have the right to have access to information in all matters of public importance subject to regulation and reasonable restrictions imposed by law.

— Article 19-19(A): Fundamental Rights and Principles of Policy; Part-II, Chapter 1: Fundamental Rights, source: The Constitution of Pakistan

== Overview ==
The Authority is responsible for facilitating and regulating the establishment and operation of all private broadcast media and distribution services in Pakistan established for the purpose of international, national, provincial, district, and local or special target audience.

== History ==
The Pakistan Electronic Media Regulatory Authority (PEMRA) was promoted by the government as an open media policy reform and was fortified with strong regulatory teeth. The establishment of PEMRA was initiated in 2000, during President Musharraf's term; through the formation of the Regulatory Authority for Media Broadcast Organisations (RAMBO) which was mandated to improve standards of information, education and entertainment; expand the choice available to the people of Pakistan in the media for news, current affairs, religions knowledge, art, culture, science, technology, economic development, social sector concerns, music, sport, drama and other subjects of public and national interest; facilitate the devolution of responsibility and power to grass roots by improving the access to mass media at the local and community level; and lastly, to ensure accountability, transparency and good governance by optimising the free flow of information.

Many pro-democratic campaigners consider this four-point mandate to be a solid foundation supporting democracy processes and comprehensive media liberalisation. However, the general opinion among media practitioners is that PEMRA only acted as a licence issuing office that has implemented regulatory barriers for broadcasters. "It is a Bhatta (money extortion in Urdu) body that collects money from broadcasting operators in a legal way. Nothing more can be expected." notes media law activist and journalist Matiullah Jan.

"Regulation of the TV and Radio should be through the participation and representation of the stake holders. What must happen is the restructuring of the Board of PEMRA with independent eminent people. It is still full of bureaucrats and ex-policemen, so there you find lack of ownership," says Matiullah Jan.

PEMRA's leadership agree to that the institution needs to be more engaged with its stakeholders. "It's a combination of regulator and the stakeholders. Therefore, the chain is - Law/Regulator/Stakeholder," says Dr. Abdul Jabbar, the Executive Member of PEMRA.

Still, a somewhat top-down approach is taken from PEMRA authorities on this matter. Referring to the issue of Code of Conduct, Dr. Abdul Jabbar said that presently there are many Codes of Conduct, one by PFUJ, one by South Asia Free Media Association (SAFMA) and the broadcasters are in the process of formulating another. "The Government will not agree to any of these, most probably. But taking all these documents into account, the government will come up with a comprehensive document that can be acceptable to all stakeholders. Then everybody has the ownership". He continued: "PEMRA will function - it will not be silenced or nullified. We will be the regulatory body. But the stakeholders will have a say in the Code of Conduct. That's what we call self-regulation."

== Chairman of the Authority ==
- Mian Javed (Founding Chairman)
- Mr. Iftikhar Rashid (2nd Chairman)
- Mr. Mushtaq Malik (3rd Chairman)
- Dr. Abdul Jabbar (Acting Chairman)
- Mr. Rashid Ahmad (4th Chairman)
- Mr. Pervaiz Rathore (Acting Chairman)
- Mr. Kamaluddin Tipu (Acting Chairman)
- Mr. Absar Alam (5th Chairman)
- Mr. Muhammad Saleem Baig (6th Chairman)

== See also ==
- E-Safety Authority
- Censorship in Pakistan
- Internet censorship in Pakistan
- List of cable operators in Pakistan
- List of radio channels in Pakistan
- List of radio channels in Pakistan
- List of television channels in Pakistan
