= Indrajit Banerjee =

Author & Director, Knowledge Societies Division UNESCO

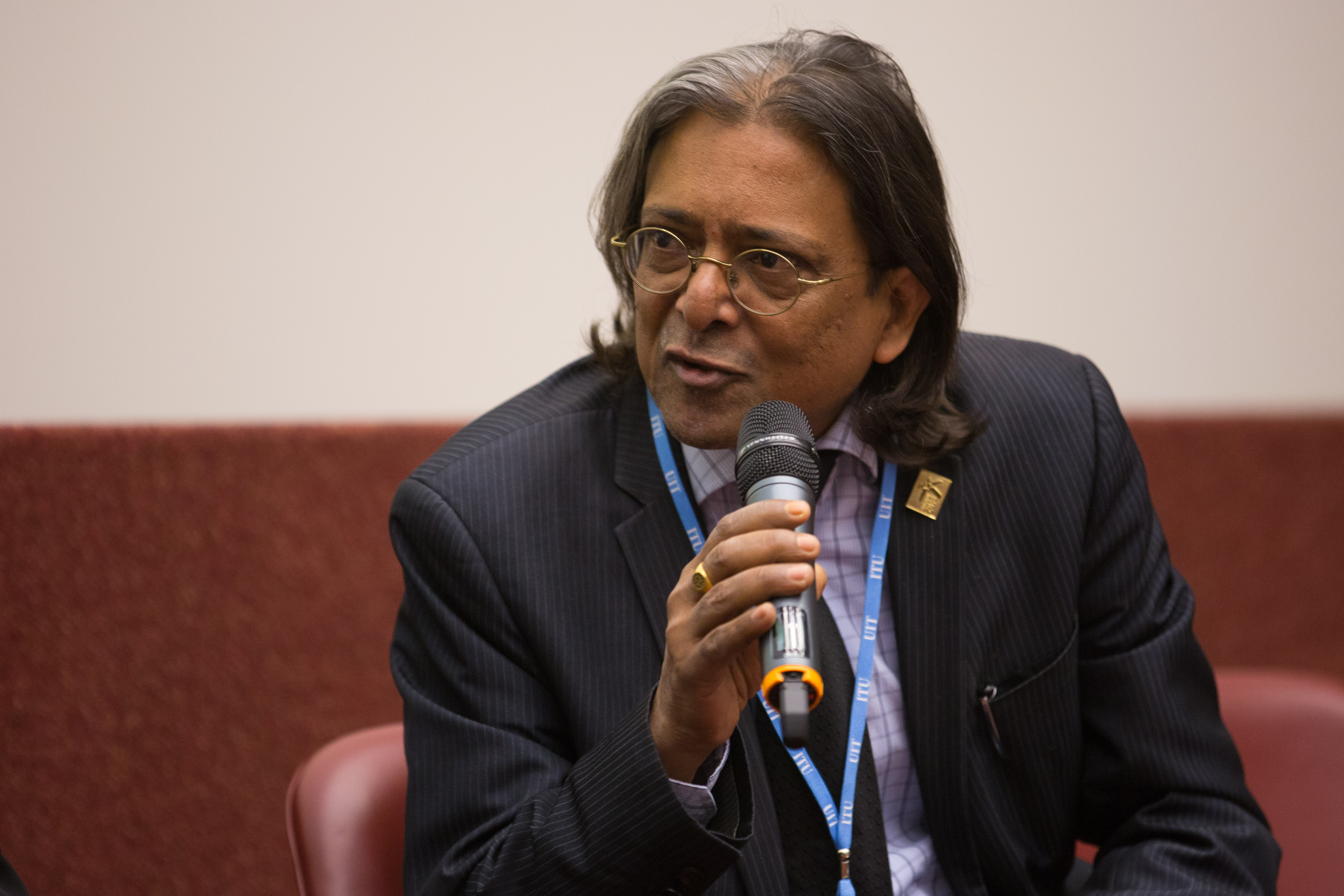
- Banerjee at WSIS 2016, a session on media, cultural diversity and heritage
- Born: 10 November 1964; Pondicherry, India
- Died: 25 January 2019 (aged 54); Pondicherry, India
- Education: Sorbonne University
- Occupations: Author and director, Knowledge Societies Division of UNESCO
- Writing career
- Genres: Media; Political science

Indrajit Banerjee (10 November 1964 – 25 January 2019) was an author on media and communication and the director of the Knowledge Societies Division at UNESCO.

He obtained a PhD with distinction from Sorbonne University Paris in communication and didactics in 1994. He served as the secretary-general of the Asian Media Information and Communication Centre (AMIC) in Singapore, from 2004 to 2009.

== Education and career ==
Indrajit Banerjee was born and brought up in Pondicherry, India. His early schooling was completed at the Sri Aurobindo International Centre of Education, where he left with a BA in Arts and Sciences in 1985. He moved to New Delhi, attending Jawaharlal Nehru University where, in 1988, he left with a MA in French. He then moved to Paris, France, where he completed a Diplôme d’Etudes Approfondies by 1990, followed by a PhD in communication and in didactics from the Sorbonne University in 1994.

In 1995, Banerjee moved to Montreal, Canada, where he worked for a year at Université du Québec as a post-doctoral research fellow in communication and media. Then, in 1996, he became Adjunct Faculty at the University of Ottawa until 1998, when he accepted the position of associate professor at the School of Communication and Information at the University Science Malaysia in Penang, Malaysia. From 2001 to 2009, he held the role of associate professor at Nanyang Technological University in Singapore and, in 2004, was also appointed as the secretary-general of the Asian Media Information and Communication Centre (AMIC), an organisation he led until he left Singapore in 2009.

Banerjee moved away from academia and joined UNESCO in their Paris headquarters in 2009 as the chief of information and communication technology in the Education, Science and Culture Section of the Communication and Information Sector. He was promoted within a year to become director in the Knowledge Societies Division within the same sector, a position he held until he died in 2019. As director, Banerjee's work was geared towards improving freedom of expression, access to information and education, and other themes aligned to the United Nations' Sustainable Development Goals. His work towards the SDGs saw contributions in the area of inclusivity and providing access for people with disabilities, culminating in various projects and events, such as the 2017 True Colours Festival for Artistes with Disabilities featuring advocate Stephen Hawking.

From 2017 onwards, Banerjee also oversaw collaboration of UNESCO with Inria for the Software Heritage project with the aim of "collecting, preserving, and sharing the source code of all the software ever written."

He was the recipient of the CIONET European Digital Leader of the Year award in 2017.

He was a member of the International Communication Association, the International Association for Media and Communication Research and the Association for Education in Journalism and Mass Communication.

== Bibliography ==
- 1995: L’internationalisation de La Télévision et Les Problèmes de l’interculturel Une Étude de Cas Sur Canal plus et Son Développement International (A.N.R.T, Université de Lille III)
- 2003: Rhetoric and Reality: The Internet Challenge for Democracy in Asia, ISBN 9812102310 (Eastern Universities Press).
- 2006: Public Service Broadcasting in the Age of Globalization, ISBN 9814136018 (Asian Media Information and Communication Centre).
- 2008: Media and Development in Asia: Regional perspectives, ISBN 9814136077 (Asian Media Information and Communication Centre).
- 2008: Asian Communication Handbook 2008, ISBN 9814136107 (Asian Media Information and Communication Centre).
- 2007: The internet and governance in Asia : a critical reader, ISBN 9814136026 (Asian Media Information and Communication Centre).
- 2009: Changing Media, Changing Societies: Media and the Millennium Development Goals, ISBN 9814136131 (Asian Media Information and Communication Centre).
