= Pakistan Today =

Pakistani newspaper

- Type: Daily newspaper Broadsheet
- Format: Berliner
- Owner: Nawa Media Corporation
- Founder: Arif Nizami
- Publisher: Arif Nizami
- Editor: M A Niazi
- Founded: 8 October 2006; 19 years ago
- Political alignment: Liberal, moderate
- Language: English
- Headquarters: Lahore, Punjab, Pakistan
- ISSN: 1098-8424
- OCLC number: 38894207
- Website: pakistantoday.com.pk

Pakistan Today is a Pakistani English-language daily newspaper, published by Nawa Media Corporation from three Pakistani cities – Lahore, Punjab; Karachi, Sindh; and Islamabad, Islamabad Capital Territory. The newspaper later launched a business magazine called Profit Magazine.

== History ==
Pakistan Today was founded by Arif Nizami in 2010 after leaving his uncle Majeed Nizami's The Nation.

== Publications ==
=== Khabaristan Today ===
Pakistan Today has a satirical column called Khabiristan Today. Since its material is often unfamiliar, its satire is sometimes lost on Western audiences. This was the case in 2014 when an article claiming the Pakistani Council of Islamic Ideology issued a proclamation stating all women are intrinsically weaker than men, was picked up by both internet and mainstream news sources.

=== Profit by Pakistan Today ===
Profit by Pakistan Today began as a bi-weekly magazine. However, following a partnership with Wall Street Journal, the magazine was later made weekly with Farooq Tirmizi as editor. It is Pakistan's only weekly business and economic magazine. Following Farooq Tirmizi's resignation, Profit appointed Khurram Hussain as managing editor.

== See also ==
- List of newspapers in Pakistan
