= Shahid-ur Rehman =

Pakistani journalist

Shahid-ur Rehman (1946–2020) was a Pakistani journalist known for his reporting on economics, finance, and the nuclear industry.

== Career ==
Rehman began his career in 1971 at Pakistan Press International and later served as the Karachi bureau chief for Morning News. Rehman also worked as a correspondent for Kyodo News Agency, a Japanese news organization, and contributed to Nucleonics Week, a publication focused on the nuclear industry and proliferation issues. Kyodo recognized his coverage of the September 11, 2001 attacks and his 2005 interview with then-President of Pakistan, Pervez Musharraf, regarding the transfer of nuclear technology to North Korea by Pakistani nuclear scientist A.Q. Khan.

Rehman authored multiple books including, Who Owns Pakistan, a study on wealth concentration in Pakistan, published in May 1998, and Long Road to Chagai, a history of Pakistan's nuclear program, released in May 1999. He also contributed to various publications, including McGraw Hill, Asia Week, North-South News Agency, and the International Herald Tribune.

Along with fellow journalist Ziauddin, Rehman played a role in establishing the Senior Journalists' Forum in Islamabad, which held meetings at the National Press Club library. However, following the deaths of Rehman and Ziauddin, the Forum's activities diminished.

Rehman died in April 2020 at the age of 74 while working on his book Pakistan: The Reckoning Begins.

== Bibliography ==
- Who Owns Pakistan (1998)
- The Long Road to Chagai (1999)
- Pakistan Sovereignty Lost (2006)
- Pakistan: The Reckoning Begins (2024)
