= Phool =

Phool may refer to:

- Phool (1945 film), a Bollywood film
- Phool (1993 film), a Bollywood film directed by Singeetam Srinivasa Rao
- Phool (magazine), an Urdu-language Pakistani children's magazine
