= Arif Nizami =

Pakistani journalist (1948–2021)

Federal Minister for Information and Postal Service (caretaker)
- In office 2 April 2013 – 7 June 2013
- President: Asif Ali Zardari
- Prime Minister: Mir Hazar Khan Khoso (caretaker)

Personal details
- Born: 14 October 1948 Punjab, Pakistan
- Died: 21 July 2021 (aged 72) Lahore, Punjab, Pakistan
- Parent: Hameed Nizami (father)

Arif Nizami (Punjabi, Urdu: عارِف نِظامی; 14 October 1948 – 21 July 2021) was a Pakistani journalist and caretaker federal minister who was the founder of the Pakistan Today.

Previously, he had been an editor of The Nation and had served as Minister of Information and Postal Service in the Khoso caretaker ministry.

In March 2023, he was posthumously awarded the Hilal-i-Imtiaz by the President of Pakistan for his contribution to the field of journalism.

== Early life ==
Arif Nizami was born in 1948 grown up in Lahore to a legendary journalist Hameed Nizami.

== Career ==
Arif left The Nation and Nawa-i-Waqt in 2009 due to personal disagreements with his uncle, the late Majid Nizami who was the managing director and Chief Executive at the family-owned newspapers at that time, whereas Arif Nizami was a part-owner and a director of the company.

In 2010, he founded Pakistan Today newspaper and served as editor of the newspaper.

In 2013, he was made caretaker federal minister for Information and Postal Service.

In 2015, Arif Nizami became CEO of Channel 24. He was also the host of a political talk show "Debate News Analysis". Arif Nizami is also known for previously hosting a current affairs show on Samaa TV. He was also a guest in 92 News Talk Show program "Ho Kya Raha Hai".

== Death ==
Arif Nizami died on Wednesday 21 July 2021 at the age of 72. Arif Nizami had suffered from a heart attack around 1 July and was admitted to a private hospital in Lahore.
