= Absar Alam =

Pakistani journalist

- Born: Absar Alam
- Occupation: Journalist

5th chairperson of Pakistan Electronic Media Regulatory Authority
- Incumbent
- Assumed office 1 December 2015
- Preceded by: Kamaluddin Tipu (acting)
- Succeeded by: Muhammad Saleem Baig

Absar Alam is a Pakistani journalist who served as the 5th chairman of Pakistan Electronic Media Regulatory Authority (PEMRA) from October 2015 to December 2017. Previously, he has worked for the Open Society Foundation.

== Early life and education ==
Alam studied at the Harvard University's Nieman Foundation for Journalism, being a Nieman Fellow in 2005.

== Journalism career ==
In 2012, Alam and journalist Hamid Mir filed a petition with the Supreme Court of Pakistan concerning the transparency of government "secret funds" distributed to media personnel. The petition led to the disclosure of a list of journalists who had received government payments.

In October 2015, Alam was appointed Chairman of PEMRA. His appointment faced legal challenges regarding his eligibility criteria and alleged political affiliations. During his tenure, the authority attempted to enforce content regulations, including a ban on a program hosted by Aamir Liaquat Hussain on Bol News. Following the attempted ban, Alam reported that PEMRA employees received threats demanding the restoration of the channel's license. His administration also issued guidelines for Ramadan broadcasts that restricted specific on-screen behaviors.

In December 2017, Alam resigned from his position as the chairman of PEMRA after the Lahore High Court declared Alam's appointment illegal citing a lack of required qualifications.

== Attack and hospitalization ==
On April 20, 2021, Alam was shot while in a park near his residence. He was hospitalized and subsequently recovered. In August 2024, an audio recording surfaced involving retired General Faiz Hameed, in which the former intelligence chief allegedly pressured Alam regarding the issuance of broadcasting licenses.

== Writings ==
The author of numerous columns and op-eds, in 2011 he released Raymond David: Safāratkār Yā Jāsūs (Urdu: ریمانڈ ڈیوائس: سفارتکار یا جاسوس), a critical examination of the Raymond Davis incident in Lahore, the controversial 2011 case of US contractor Raymond Davis, the question of diplomatic immunity, and related legal and political issues.
