= Urdu Digest =

Pakistani general-interest magazine

- Urdu Digest, May 1966 issue
- Editor-in-chief: Vacant
- Former editors: Altaf Hassan Qureshi (1959~2026)
- Format: Digest
- Founder: Altaf Hassan Qureshi / Ejaz Hassan Qureshi
- First issue: 1959; 67 years ago
- Country: Pakistan
- Based in: Lahore, Pakistan
- Language: Urdu

Urdu Digest (Urdu: اردو ڈائجسٹ) is a Pakistani monthly Urdu magazine.

== History and impact ==
Urdu Digest was the first digest in Pakistan that started in 1959 in Lahore. Its format is similar to the famous American monthly, Reader's Digest. Its writings present a traditional way of religious Pakistani life and covers a large variety of topics. Urdu Digest is constantly performing the duty of character building and consciousness of Pakistanis. The magazine also has been serving to strengthen the ideology of Pakistan and promoting national integration. Urdu Digest publishes translations of international literary stories, adventure stories, hunting stories and articles on science, technology, history, animals, education, health, positive thinking and business role models.

Dr. Aijaz Hasan Qureshi, Altaf Hassan Qureshi, and Malik Zafar Ullah Khan are its pioneers and editors. Also Abad Shah Puri, Maqbool Jahangir, Zia Shahid, Mohsen Farani, Syed Asim Mahmood and Akhtar Abbas worked for Urdu Digest as assistant editors. Now Tayyab Aijaz is the managing editor of Urdu Digest.

== Projects ==
Urdu Digest has started many new projects, such as Urdu Forum. Wasi Shah has been selected as first Safeer-e-Urdu for 2012. Many other prominent scholars are on the panel of Urdu Digest. Since 2003, the administration of Urdu Digest has also run the Karwan-e-Ilm Foundation, a noncommercial charitable organization to save and promote talent of Pakistan. The foundation has been providing financial assistance to deserving talented students who secure more than 75% marks in Matric and Intermediate Examinations, irrespective of creed and domicile and are pursuing education in professional and higher academic institutions in the sciences, engineering, medicine, commerce and agriculture.
