= List of cable operators in Pakistan =

This is a list of cable operators in Pakistan. Television operators are regulated by the Pakistan Electronic Media Regulatory Authority.

Main Cable TV Operators In Pakistan
Name	City	Type	POC
StormFiber / Cybernet	20 cities	IPTV	Cyber Internet Services / Lakson Group
Transworld	Multiple	IPTV	Transworld Associates
Nayatel	Multiple	Cable TV & IPTV	Nayatel
Worldcall	Lahore & Karachi	Cable TV	Worldcall
PTCL	Nationwide	IPTV	PTCL
Wateen	Lahore	Cable TV	Wateen
