= The Voice of Youth =

- Website type: Blog
- Founded: June 26, 2010
- Founder: Momal Mushtaq
- Website: www.thevoiceofyouth.com

The Voice of Youth (tVoY) is a Pakistani youth network spread across 151 countries.

== History ==
tVoY was initiated by a student of National University of Sciences and Technology, Pakistan (NUST) in June, 2010 to cultivate relations with youth across different strata of life. Its deeper visionary objective is to create a forum where the youth of Pakistan could mingle and enrich each other's perceptions and views.

Social media brought the conflict zones of the world into view. With the vision of a peaceful society, one of the goals of tVoY is to speak to millions about resolution of conflicts, their nature and root causes.

Considering the swift spread of online journalism and online information, tVoY aims to connect through the use of digital technology and by granting the right to express heterogeneous views.

== Mission ==
To cultivate relations with youth belonging to different strata of life, providing all with a platform to freely pursue their individuality for collective progression. The Voice of Youth is a youth-focused organization that aims to connect young people from diverse social and educational backgrounds. The organization provides a platform where youth can develop leadership skills, express their ideas, participate in community initiatives, and contribute to collective social progress through collaboration and civic engagement.

== Goals ==
- Lend youth a voice to express their ideas, opinions and aspirations for themselves and their community
- Help groom youth’s perspective by presenting many views on social issues, thus enhancing acceptance, tolerance and broad-mindedness
- Highlight youth voices from conflict zones
- Digitally preserve Urdu and regional languages for future generations
- Connect young people around the world

== Blog ==
tVoY started out as a blog for Palestinians on June 26, 2010. It expanded for the student community at large in August, 2010.

== Network ==
tVoY has a core team of 11 young contributors. It has approximately 1000 representatives from about 75 educational institutes in Pakistan. The first batch of interns was recruited in August 2011.

== Acclaim ==
tVoY has received acclaim from Pakistani newspapers, journals and online publications. Prominent among them are Pakistan Observer, The Nation, The News and Dawn.

== Partners ==
tVoY has partnered with many national and international youth-led events, organizations and societies.
