= Zamir Niazi =

Journalist (1932-2004)

Zamir Niazi (1932 – 11 June 2004) was a Pakistani journalist, known for his commitment to freedom of the press.

In 1995, Niazi returned his Pride of Performance award to the government, in response to its closure of six newspapers.

== Career ==
Zamir Niazi began as a journalist in 1954 by joining Dawn newspaper where he also worked as a sub-editor for eight years. He then joined another Pakistani newspaper, Daily News, as its chief sub-editor and lead writer in 1962. In 1965, he started working for a major business newspaper of Pakistan, the Business Recorder where he worked for 25 years in different capacities. He was its news editor when he retired from the Business Recorder in 1990.

== The Press in Chains ==
He is best known for the book The Press in Chains that was published in 1986. The book investigates press censorship in Pakistan. It documents instances of press censorship during the British colonial rule in India and during the first three decades of Pakistan's independence especially under authoritarian military governments in Pakistan. This book was critically acclaimed and its several editions were published. This book was originally in English and was also translated into Urdu language.

== Bibliography ==
- Niazi, Zamir (1986). The Press in Chains. GoogleBooks.
- Niazi, Zamir (1992). The press under siege. Karachi Press Club.
- Niazi, Zamir (1994). The Web of Censorship. Oxford University Press. ISBN 978-0-19-577543-3.
- Zameen Ka Noha (Earth's Cry Of Pain) - on the subject of nuclear technology and its bad effects

== Awards and recognition ==
- Pride of Performance Award by the President of Pakistan in 1994

== Death and legacy ==
Zamir Niazi died on 11 June 2004 at age 72 at Karachi, after being unwell for some time. He was admitted to a hospital for treatment just three days before his death. Among his survivors were his widow and two sons, Haris Zamir and Junaid Zamir.

After writing three above books on press freedom in Pakistan, he was widely considered in Pakistan to be an authority on the issue of press freedom. According to a major newspaper of Pakistan, Zamir Niazi was "uncompromisingly critical of corruption and corrupting influences affecting the media" in Pakistan.

On 29 June 2004, an event was arranged at the Pakistan Academy of Letters, Islamabad to pay tributes to the journalist Zamir Niazi by noted scholars and intellectuals of Pakistan including Iftikhar Arif and Tariq Rahman. It was mentioned by speakers at this event that Zamir Niazi was often called as 'Zameer' (the conscience) of Pakistani Press.
