= Government Islamia Graduate College Sangla Hill =

College in Punjab, Pakistan

- گورنمنٹ اسلامیہ گریجویٹ کالج سانگلہ ہل
- Other names: GIGCS
- Former names: Government Islamia Postgraduate College, Sangla Hill
- Motto: 'العلم حلم' (in Arabic)
- Motto in English: 'Science is a Dream'
- Type: Public
- Established: 10 September 1966
- Academic affiliations: University of the Punjab; Board of Intermediate and Secondary Education; Government College University Faisalabad
- Principal: Muhammad Saeed Akhtar
- Dean: Muhammad Gulbaz Khan & Prof. Muhammad Afzal Khan Bhatti
- Academic staff: 21
- Students: 1267
- Location: Sangla Hill, Punjab, Pakistan; 31.7062301°N 73.3845443°E
- Website: gigcs.edu.pk
- Location in Punjab, Pakistan Government Islamia Graduate College Sangla Hill (Pakistan)

The Government Islamia Graduate College Sangla Hill (GIGCS) (Urdu: گورنمنٹ اسلامیہ گریجویٹ کالج سانگلہ ہل), previously known as Government Islamia Postgraduate College Sangla Hill, is a government college located in Sangla Hill, in Nankana Sahib District of Punjab, Pakistan.

== History ==
It was founded on 10 September 1966 as an intermediate college for boys and promoted to a degree college in 1985.

== Academics ==
GIGCS is organised into two divisions, the science and arts division. These divisions are further categorised as academic departments. The core departments include commerce, computer science, chemistry, biology, physics, English, Islamic studies, Urdu, history, political science, geography, education, mathematics, economics and statistics.

=== Faculties ===
There are two faculties with 12 departments. It has 21 full-time faculty members involved in teaching (1267 students)

- Faculty of Art
- Faculty of Science

== Programs offered ==
College is currently offering educational programs at four levels (intermediate, associate, undergraduate and graduate).

=== Intermediate programs ===
College provides (12-year education) Intermediate (2-Year) program at Intermediate level. College is affiliated with BISE Lahore which has allowed these programs:

- F.Sc Pre-engineering
- F.Sc Pre-medical
- I.C.S
- FA General science
- FA (IT)
- FA

=== Associate degree programs - ADP ===
College provides (14-year education) Associate (2-Year) program at the Associate level. College is affiliated with University of the Punjab which has allowed these programs:

- ADA (B.A)
- ADS (B.Sc.)

=== Undergraduate programs ===
College provides (16-year education) BS Honors (4-Year) co-education program at the undergraduate level. The college will be affiliated with Government College University Faisalabad which has allowed these programs:

- BS Chemistry

=== Master's degree programs ===
College provides (16-year education) Master (2-Year) co-education program at the Graduate level. College is affiliated with University of the Punjab which has allowed these programs:

- MA Urdu
- MA Islamiyat
- MA English

== Gallery ==
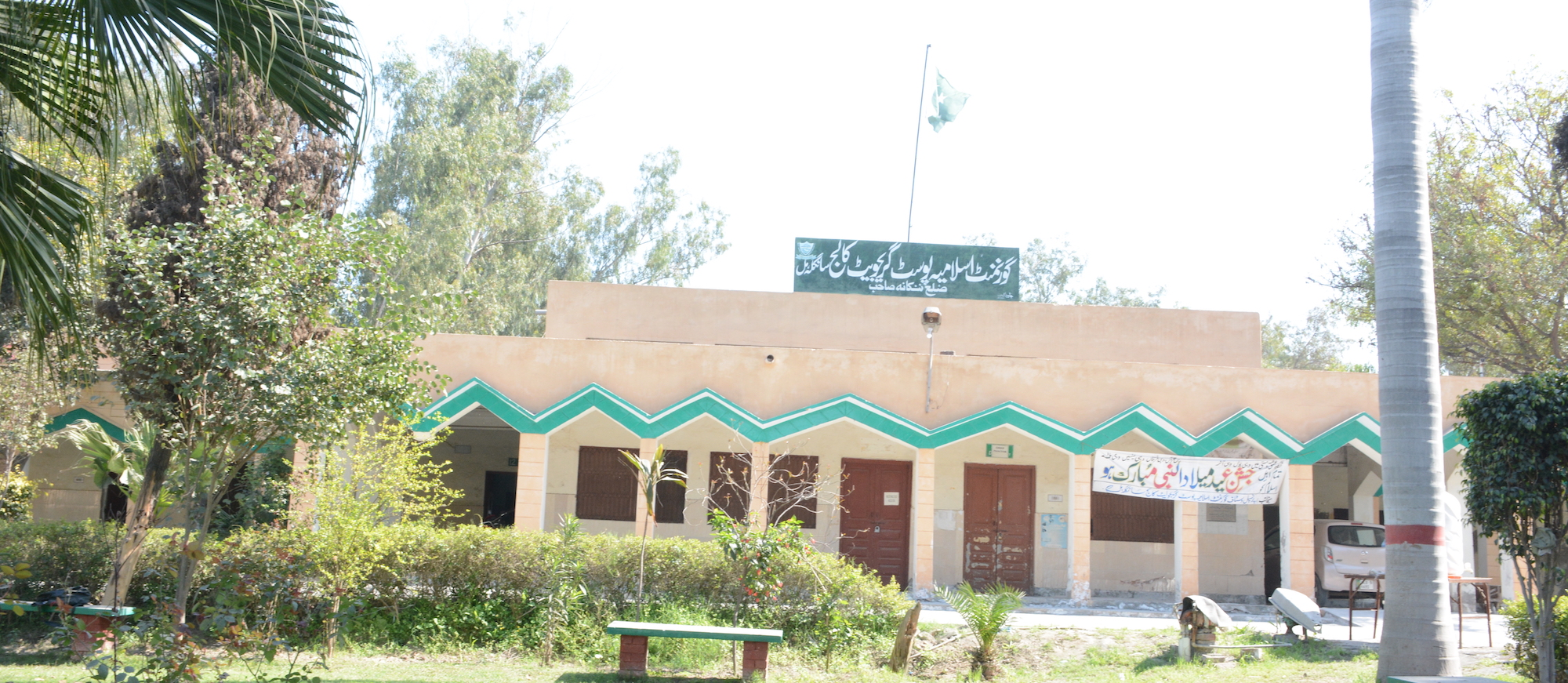
Old Block

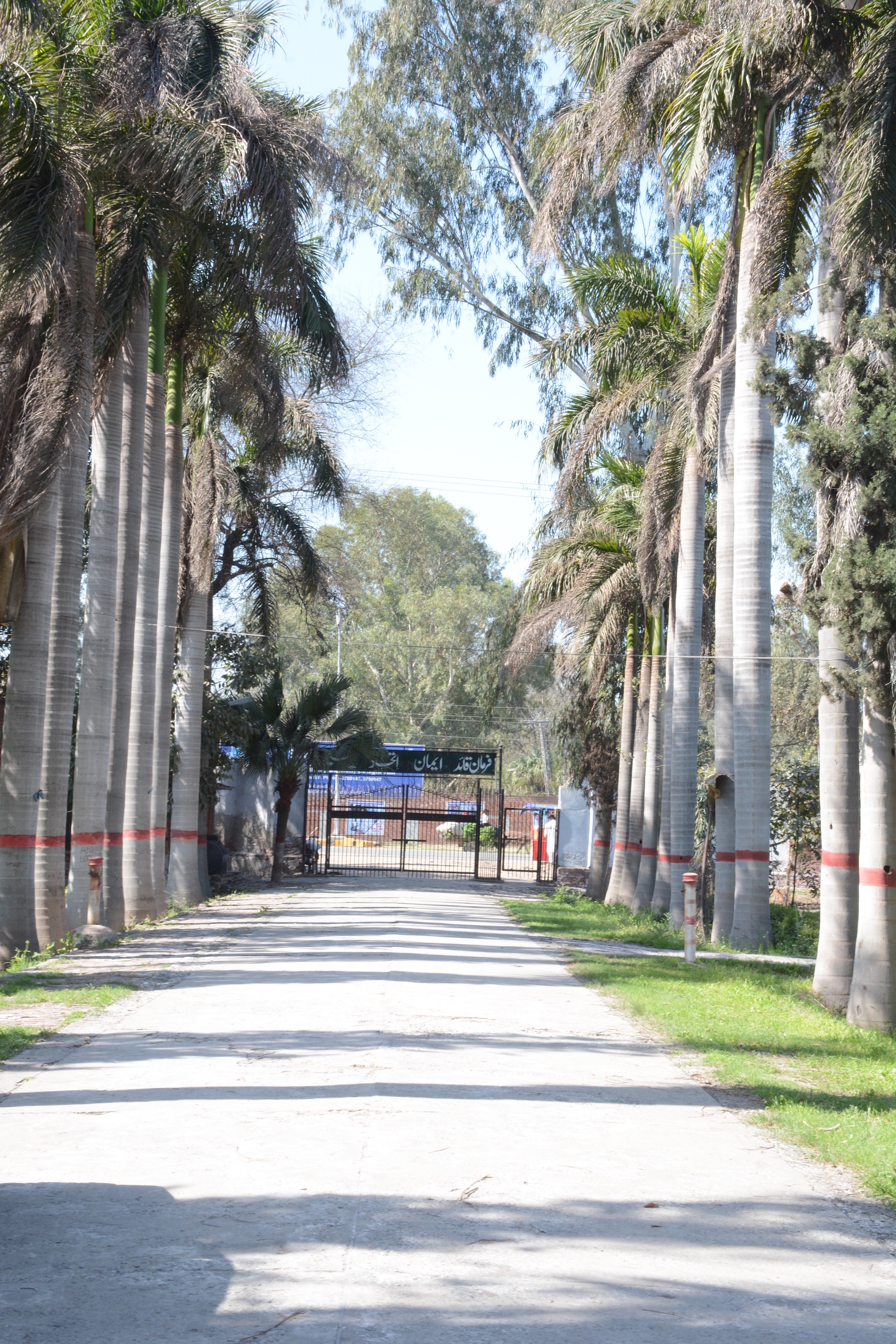
College Entrance

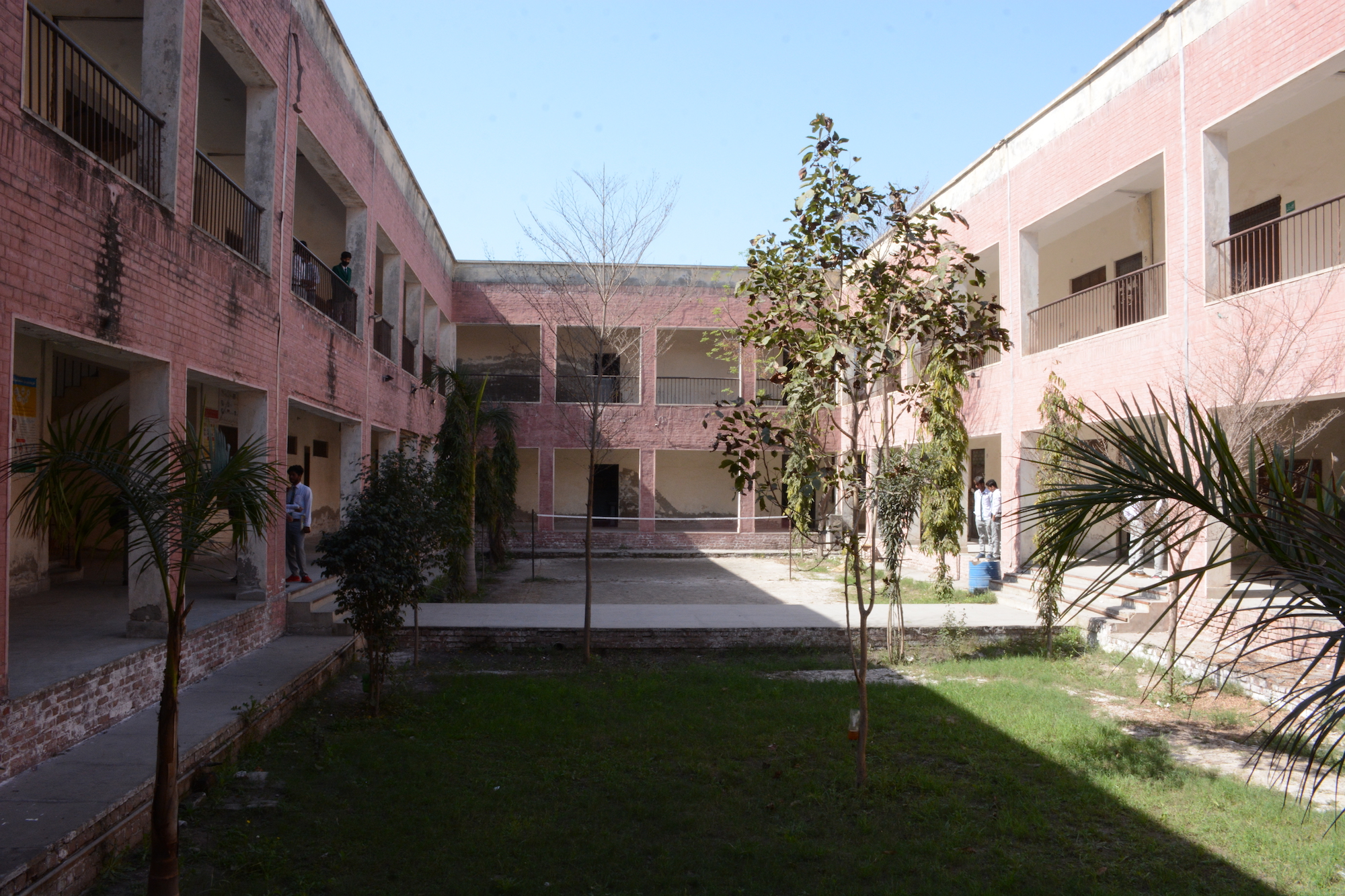
New Block
