= Asian Journal of Communication =

- Discipline: Communication studies
- Language: English
- Edited by: Ang Peng Hwa

Publication details
- History: 1990–present
- Publisher: Routledge
- Frequency: Bimonthly
- Impact factor: 1.097 (2018)

Standard abbreviations
- ISO 4: Asian J. Commun.

Indexing
- ISSN: 0129-2986 (print); 1742-0911 (web)
- LCCN: 94942787
- OCLC no.: 475594259

Links
- Journal homepage

The Asian Journal of Communication is a peer-reviewed academic journal which focuses on the systems and processes of communication in the Asia-Pacific region and among Asian communities around the world. The journal is published by Routledge on behalf of the Asian Media Information and Communication Centre and the editor-in-chief is Ang Peng Hwa.

== Abstracting and indexing ==
The journal is abstracted and indexed in

- Communication and Mass Media Complete
- CSA Worldwide Political Science Abstracts
- Scopus
- Social Sciences Citation Index
- Sociological Abstracts

According to the Journal Citation Reports, the journal has a 2018 impact factor of 1.097.
