= Chaudhry Tariq Mehmood Bajwa =

Pakistani politician (born 1963)

Member of the Provincial Assembly of the Punjab
- In office 2008 – 31 May 2018
- Constituency: PP-170 (Nankana Sahib-I)

Personal details
- Born: 12 July 1963 (age 63) Sangla Hill
- Party: Independent Candidate (Bajwa Group)

Chaudhry Tariq Mehmood Bajwa is a Pakistani politician who was a Member of the Provincial Assembly of the Punjab from 2008 to May 2018.

== Early life and education ==
Bajwa was born on 12 July 1963 in Sangla Hill. He is married and has four children.

Bajwa graduated in 2007 from Bahauddin Zakariya University and holds BA degree.

== Political career ==
Bajwa ran for the seat of the Provincial Assembly of the Punjab as an independent candidate from Constituency PP-170 (Sheikhupura-IX) in the 2002 Pakistani general election, but was unsuccessful. He received 14,846 votes and lost the seat to Asif Jillani, a candidate of Pakistan Muslim League (Q) (PML-Q).

Bajwa was elected to the Provincial Assembly of the Punjab as a candidate of Pakistan Muslim League (N) (PML-N) from Constituency PP-170 (Nankana Sahib-I) in the 2008 Pakistani general election. He received 25,890 votes and defeated Asif Jillani, a candidate of Pakistan Peoples Party (PPP).

He was re-elected to the Provincial Assembly of the Punjab as a candidate of PML-N from Constituency PP-170 (Nankana Sahib-I) in the 2013 Pakistani general election. He received 36,444 votes and defeated an independent candidate, Mian Ijaz Hussain Bhatti.
