= Phool (magazine) =

- Phool, February 2012
- Editor: Shoaib Mirza
- Frequency: Monthly
- Format: Digest
- Founded: 1990
- Company: Nawa-i-Waqt Group
- Country: Pakistan
- Based in: Lahore, Punjab, Pakistan
- Language: Urdu
- Website: www.phool.com.pk

Phool (est. 1990) is a monthly magazine for children published by Nawa-i-Waqt group of publications owned by Majid Nizami Trust, from Lahore, Punjab, Pakistan. It is edited by Shoaib Mirza.

In 2010, Pakistan Prime Minister [Yusuf Raza Gilani] congratulated Phool on the completion of 20 years of publication, saying "It is a matter of satisfaction that the magazine is playing an important role to impart educating to the young generation besides providing them entertaining." In 2008, International Islamic University awarded Phool the "Best Children's Magazine" in a competition published in 'Tameer-e-Pakistan Number' organized by Dawah Academy and Department of Children Literature.
