= Matiullah Jan =

Pakistani journalist

- مطیع اللہ جان
- Born: 1969 (age 56–57); Pakistan
- Citizenship: Pakistan
- Education: Quaid-i-Azam University; City, University of London
- Occupation: Journalist
- Years active: 1992–present
- Spouse: Kaneez Sughra
- Children: 2

YouTube information
- Channel: Matiullah Jan MJtv
- Years active: 2018–present
- Genre: Journalism
- Subscribers: 503k
- Views: 110 million
- Last updated: 3 January 2026

Matiullah Jan (Note: Urdu: مطیع اللہ جان) (born 1969) is a Pakistani journalist and author who reports from the Supreme Court of Pakistan. He is also the host of Sahafi on Neo News and runs his YouTube channel, MJtv.

== Early life and education ==
Matiullah Jan was born in 1969 into a military family. His father was a Pakistan Army officer. He briefly attended the Pakistan Military Academy before turning to journalism.

He later earned a master's degree in defence and strategic studies from Quaid-i-Azam University, followed by another master's degree in international journalism from City, University of London. He attended the London program as a Chevening Scholar in 2001–02.

== Career ==
Jan began his journalism career in the mid-1990s, working at Radio Pakistan and The Frontier Post, and later as a reporter for News Network International (NNI). He also worked for Pakistan Television (PTV).

After completing his studies in the United Kingdom, Jan joined Dawn News in the late 2000s as a special correspondent covering the Supreme Court and legal affairs. He later hosted Apna Apna Gareban (lit. 'Own Collar'), a current-affairs program examining misconduct within media and political institutions. The program attracted controversy and was taken off air, after which Jan left Dawn News in 2012. Later, he joined Waqt News, where he hosted a similar investigative talk show focused on governance, corruption, and the rule of law. During this period, he also wrote opinion columns for The Nation and Nawa-i-Waqt.

In September 2017, unidentified assailants threw a brick through the windshield of his car near Islamabad while he was driving with his children. He was not injured. Due to his criticism of the military establishment he has been threatened many times. In 2018, he was sacked from Waqt News, where he was working as a TV host. He then launched his YouTube channel, MJtv, where he began publishing independent reporting and commentary.

In 2020, Jan interviewed former DG FIA. In July 2020, Jan was abducted in Islamabad outside the school where his wife works. CCTV footage showed armed men forcing him into a vehicle. His car was later found abandoned. The abduction occurred one day before he was scheduled to appear before the Supreme Court in a contempt of court case related to a tweet critical of the judiciary. He was released approximately 12 hours later and left blindfolded on the outskirts of the city. No suspects were arrested, despite a criminal case being filed.

In 2023, he returned to television as host of Sahafi (lit. 'Journalist') on Neo News, while continuing to publish content on his digital platform. In November 2024, Jan was detained in Islamabad and charged with drug possession, resisting arrest, and terrorism. Police claimed narcotics were recovered from his vehicle at a checkpoint. Jan denied the allegations, stating that he was detained by unidentified men while covering a protest and that the charges were fabricated. An anti-terrorism court granted him bail days later.

== Personal life ==
Matiullah is married to Kaneez Sughra and is based in Islamabad.

== Publications ==
He has authored or co-authored the following publications:

- Guaranteeing Copyright: Media Manager's Guide to Pakistani Broadcast Law, Internews, 2004. Co-authored with Muhammad Aftab Alam.
- Media in Pakistan, Growing Space, Shrinking Freedoms: Annual Report on State of Media Freedoms in Pakistan, Internews, 2005. Co-authored with Adnan Rehmat.
- Watching the Watchdog, How Pakistan is Front Paged and Headlined? : a Report on Trends in Pakistani Media, Centre for Civic Education Pakistan, 2006. Co-authored with Zafarullah Khan.
