= Majeed Nizami =

Pakistani journalist

NI, SP, SI Majid Nizami
- Born: April 3, 1928; Sangla Hill, Punjab, British India (now in Pakistan)
- Died: July 26, 2014 (aged 86); Lahore, Punjab, Pakistan
- Education: Islamia College, Lahore
- Occupations: editor, columnist and journalist
- Spouse: Reehana Majid Nizami
- Children: Rameeza Majid Nizami (daughter)
- Honours: Nishan-e-Imtiaz; Sitara-e-Pakistan; Sitara-e-Imtiaz

Majid Nizami (April 3, 1928 – July 26, 2014) was a journalist, Chairman of Majid Nizami Trust, chief editor and publisher of Nawa-i-Waqt Group of Publications of Pakistan. Nawa-i-Waqt newspaper was founded by Majid's elder brother, Hameed Nizami (3 October 1915 – 22 February 1962) in 1940, who had later died in 1962 at age 46 in Pakistan and is now owned by Majid Nizami Trust. Majid Nizami started managing the Nawa-i-Waqt newspaper after his elder brother's passing in 1962. Majid Nizami was also the chairman of Nazaria-i-Pakistan Trust.

== Early life and career ==
After doing his high school education in his local town Sangla Hill, Majid Nizami was educated at Islamia College, Lahore, where he obtained his master's degree in Political Science and then went on to London to study law in 1954. During his student days in British India, he actively participated in the Pakistan Movement working towards the independence of Pakistan in 1947. Majid Nizami was one of the few people who served as an editor of a newspaper group for 48 years, as well as a journalist for 59 years.

== Awards and recognition ==
Majid Nizami had won 3 different awards from the Government of Pakistan for his services during his lifetime.

- Nishan-e-Imtiaz (Order of Excellence) Award
- Sitara-i-Imtiaz (Star of Excellence) Award
- Sitara-e-Pakistan (Star of Pakistan) Award
- Living Legend of Journalism Award in 2010
- Lifetime Achievement Award by All Pakistan Newspapers Society in 2011

== See also ==
- The Nation (Pakistani newspaper)
- Nawa-i-Waqt (Pakistani newspaper)
- List of Pakistani journalists
