= Daily Pakistan =

Pakistani newspaper

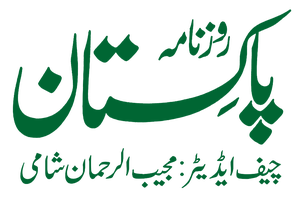
- Type: Private
- Format: Broadsheet
- Editor-in-chief: Mujeeb-ur-Rehman Shami
- Founded: 1997
- Language: Urdu and English
- Headquarters: Lahore, Pakistan
- Website: dailypakistan.com.pk

The Daily Pakistan (Urdu: روزنامہ پاکستان) is a daily newspaper in Pakistan, published both in Urdu language and in English.

Mujeeb-ur-Rehman Shami is its chief editor.

Daily Pakistan is currently published from Lahore, Karachi, Islamabad, Multan and Peshawar simultaneously.

== History ==
This Lahore-based daily was started in December 1997 by Akbar Ali Bhatti. It was the first newspaper of Pakistan that came in a coloured form. Bhatti suffered many hardships and was imprisoned due to clashes with the government. The newspaper was then handed over to Mujeeb ur Rehman Shami. Prior to taking over Daily Pakistan, he was editor-in-chief of the Weekly Zindagi, Lahore. Shami was president, Council of Pakistan Newspaper Editors (CPNE) in 2002.

== Notable columnists ==
- Mujeeb-ur-Rehman Shami (Jalsa-e-Aam) (Chief editor of Daily Pakistan)
- Shahid Malik (Kush-Kalami)

== See also ==
- List of newspapers in Pakistan
