= Hamid Nizami =

Pakistani journalist (1915–1962)

Hameed Nizami
- Born: 3 October 1915; Sangla Hill, Lyallpur, Punjab, British India (present-day Pakistan)
- Died: 22 February 1962 (aged 46); Lahore, Punjab, Pakistan
- Resting place: Taxali Gate Cemetery
- Citizenship: Pakistan
- Education: BA and MA in English literature
- Alma mater: Islamia College; Punjab University
- Occupation: Journalist
- Years active: 1935–62
- Known for: Founder of Urdu-language newspaper Nawa-i-Waqt
- Political party: All India Muslim League
- Movement: Pakistan Movement
- Children: journalist Arif Nizami (son)
- Relatives: journalist Majid Nizami (younger brother)

Hameed Nizami or Hamid Nizami (Punjabi, Urdu: حمید نظامی; b. 3 October 1915 – 22 February 1962), was an eminent journalist, literary figure, Pakistan Movement activist, and the founder and editor-in-chief of the Urdu-language newspaper, the Nawa-i-Waqt (lit. 'The Voice of the Time').

He earned national prominence for penning several political articles and opinionated columns in support of the successful Pakistan Movement while he played a crucial role in the growing influence of the print journalism in Pakistan.

== Biography ==
Hameed Nizami was born in the remote railway junction town of Sangla Hill, District Nankana Sahi, a few miles from the vintage city Lyallpur (now Faisalabad), Punjab, British India, on 3 October 1915. He hailed from a Punjabi family and initially studied at the local school in Faisalabad at his own expense. He attended the Islamia College where he gained a BA degree in Journalism. Later, he attended the Punjab University in Lahore where he attained the MA degree in English Literature.

During his years in college, he was politically active. He founded and served as president of the 'Punjab Muslim Students Federation' wing of the All India Muslim League in 1937. His role as student leader and journalist led him to become closer to Muhammad Ali Jinnah. After attaining master's degree in journalism, he joined the press directorate of the Punjab government for a short time before joining the literary staff of the Orient Press.

=== Nawa-i-Waqt newspaper ===
On 27 March 1940, Nizami left the Orient Press and founded the Nawa-i-Waqt newspaper from Lahore, British India. He became the newspaper's first editor-in-chief from Lahore on 23 March 1940. The Nawa-i-Waqt was a monthly newspaper but he quickly converted the newspaper into weekly on 15 December 1942. After hiring more staff and gaining more credibility, the Nawa-i-Waqt began publishing as a daily newspaper on 19 July 1944. The first edition of the Nawa-i-Waqt came out on 22 July 1944 with an Islamic prayer and a message of Muhammad Ali Jinnah in it.

Nizami's efforts made Nawa-i-Waqt, with all its resources limitations, a powerful voice of the people for the cause of All India Muslim League and he penned several articles for the support of Pakistan Movement. He was noted as a strong spokesman for democracy in the country, and wrote a harsh column against the first martial law imposed by President Iskander Mirza. Through his newspaper, he took hard stance on communism and supported capitalism during the 1950s.

He began to raise his voice against the martial law despite hardship imposed by the government. He once described the martial law as a "dark night".

== Commemorative postage stamp ==
Pakistan Post Office issued a commemorative postage stamp on 14 August 1991 to honor Hameed Nizami in its 'Pioneers of Freedom' stamp series.

== Death and legacy ==
Hameed Nizami died on 22 February 1962 in Lahore. His death was mourned throughout the country. After his death, the newspaper founded the "Hameed Nizami Memorial Society" (HNMS) dedicated to his style of journalism, and held memorial sessions on his death anniversary every year. His journalism style was influenced by the renowned philosopher, Iqbal, and he had conveyed Iqbal's words in articles he wrote. To many conservative politicians, Nizami is noted as a crucial figure in shaping the print media in Pakistan.

Hameed Nizami's son, Arif Nizami, and grandson, Babar Nizami, run the daily newspaper Pakistan Today.

In 2013, The Hameed Nizami Memorial Society held an event on his 51st death anniversary in Lahore, Pakistan where noted Pakistani scholars and political leaders spoke to pay him tributes including SM Zafar, Justice Nasira Iqbal and Bushra Rahman.
