= Asian Media Information and Communication Centre =

International non-government organization

- Abbreviation: AMIC
- Formation: February 1971
- Type: Not-for-profit academic association
- Website: amic.asia

Asian Media Information and Communication Centre (AMIC) is an international non-government organization (NGO) whose mission is to promote communication research and education and to facilitate dialogue on media ethics, information policy, and knowledge management among academic, industry, government, and civil society in the Asia-Pacific region.

== History ==
AMIC (formerly, Asian Mass Communication Research and Information Centre) was founded by the Government of Singapore and the German Social Democratic political party's Friedrich Ebert Foundation in February 1971. AMIC was registered as a non-profit charity in Singapore in the same year. The first general meeting was held in Kuala Lumpur, Malaysia, in June 1972. Y. V. Lakhsmana Rao played a key role in establishing AMIC.

AMIC transferred its operation to Manila, Philippines, in 2015. It became a non-stock and non-profit organization at the Philippines' Securities & Exchange Commission (SEC). The current Chair of the Board of Directors is Crispin Maslog, and the Secretary General is Ramon Tuazon. The headquarters are housed in Philippine Women's University. AMIC's organizational partners include the UNESCO and the Asian Institute of Journalism and Communication.

In addition to books and reports, AMIC publishes the Asian Journal of Communication, Asian Mass Communication Bulletin, and Media Asia. These academic journals focus on the development of media and communication theories, strategies, and practices from Asian-Pacific perspectives. Wilbur Schramm, Director of the East–West Communication Institute at the East–West Center in Hawaii, wrote an open letter for the 1974 inaugural issue of Media Asia. Syed Rahim and Anthony J. Pennings wrote Computerization and Development in Southeast Asia (AMIC, 1987), a benchmark study of ICT4D in Asia. Majid Tehranian, Professor in the School of Communications at the University of Hawaii at Manoa, authored the lead article for the 1990 inaugural issue of the Asian Journal of Communication.

AMIC sponsors an annual conference. The 30th AMIC annual convention was held at the Communication University of China in Beijing, China, on September 24–26, 2024. The convention theme was "Asia as a (Knowledge) Sharing Society and Internationalization of Higher Education." The 29th AMIC annual convention was held in Bandung, Indonesia on September 28-30, 2023. The convention theme was "Talk ASAP: Africa-Asia Pacific Dialogue on Communication Issues."

== Publications ==
- Adhikarya, R. (1983). Knowledge transfer and usage in communication studies: The U.S.-ASEAN case. Asian Mass Communication Research and Information Center.
- Amunugama, S., & Said, A. R. b M. (Eds.). (1982). Communications research in Asia. Asian Mass Communication Research and Information Center.
- Dissanayake, W. (Ed.). (2022). Communication theory: The Asian perspective (2nd ed.). Asian Media Information and Communication Center.
- Dissanayake, W., & Said, A. R. b M. (Eds.). (1983). Communications research and cultural values. Asian Mass Communication Research and Information Center.
- Goonasekera, A., Beng, Y. S., & Mahizhnan, A. (Eds.). (1996). Opening windows: Issues in communication—The silver jubilee collection. Asian Mass Communication Research and Information Center.
- Jayaweera, N., & Amunugama, S. (Eds.). (1987). Rethinking development communication. Asian Mass Communication Research and Information Center.
- Lowe, V. (Ed.). (1984). Communication research needs and priorities for Asia. Asian Mass Communication Research and Information Center.
- Maslog, C. C. (Ed.). (2022). AMIC@50: Turning gold—A history of the Asian Media Information and Communication Centre. Asian Media Information and Communication Center.
- Muppidi, S. R. (Ed.). (2012). Asian communication handbook (6th ed.). Asian Media Information and Communication Center.
- Rahim, S, and Pennings, A. (1987) Computerization and Development in Southeast Asia. AMIC.
- Rogers, E. M. (2008). The fourteenth paw: Growing up on an Iowa farm in the 1930s. Asian Media Information and Communication Center.

== See also ==
- Communication ethics
- Communication theory
- Development communication
- Information ethics
- Information policy
- Intercultural communication
- International communication
- Journalism
- Journalism ethics and standards
- Media ethics
