= South Asia Free Media Association =

Non-governmental organization

South Asia Free Media Association (SAFMA)
- Type: Non-governmental organization
- Legal status: Active
- Purpose: Promoting free and fair media in South Asia
- Location: SAARC member countries
- Region served: Indian subcontinent
- Members: Media representatives
- President: Muhammad Ziauddin (2002–2006)
- Main organ: South Asian Journal
- Website: safmanet.com
- Remarks: SAFMA runs the South Asia Media School since 2007.

The South Asia Free Media Association (SAFMA) is a non-governmental organization of media representatives from SAARC member countries. SAFMA runs the South Asia Media School since 2007 and also published the South Asian Journal.

== Presidents ==
- Muhammad Ziauddin (2002–2006)
