= Sangla Hill =

Sangla Hill سانگلہ ہل
- City
- Location within Punjab, Pakistan Location within Pakistan
- Coordinates: 31°42′48″N 73°22′28″E
- Country: Pakistan
- Province: Punjab
- District: Nankana Sahib
- Tehsil: Sangla Hill Tehsil

Government
  - Type: Municipal Committee
  - Chief Officer: Kashif Mukhtar
  - Municipal Officer: Vacant

Population (2023)
  - City: 103,709
  - Rank: 120th in Pakistan

Sangla Hill is a city in the Nankana Sahib District of the Punjab province of Pakistan. It lies 103 km from the provincial capital Lahore and 47 km from Faisalabad. Until 2005, it was part of Sheikhupura District.

== Demographics ==
Population

Historical population
Year	Pop.	±% p.a.
1951	9,379	—
1961	13,738	+3.89%
1972	25,411	+5.75%
1981	33,771	+3.21%
1998	50,368	+2.38%
2017	61,498	+1.06%
2023	103,709	+9.10%

Languages

Languages of Sangla Hill MC (2023 Census)
1. Punjabi (94.9%)
2. Urdu (3.80%)
3. Others (1.30%)

== Education ==
=== Colleges ===
- Government Islamia Graduate College Sangla Hill
- Jinnah Polytechnic Institute

== Notable people ==
- Chaudhry Tariq Mehmood Bajwa
- Hamid Nizami
- Barjees Tahir
