= Business Recorder =

Pakistani newspaper

- Type: Daily newspaper
- Format: Broadsheet
- Owner: Business Recorder Group
- Founder: M.A. Zuberi
- Editor: Wamiq Zuberi
- Founded: 1965
- Language: English
- Headquarters: 531 Recorder House, Business Recorder Road, Karachi, Pakistan
- Website: brecorder.com

Business Recorder is an English-language financial daily newspaper in Pakistan, founded by Muhammad Ahmed Zuberi in 1965.

The publication is owned by the Business Recorder Group.

Newspaper founder's eldest son, Wamiq Zuberi, is the editor of the newspaper, and chief executive officer of the Business Recorder Group.

== History ==
Business Recorder was launched on 27 April 1965 by veteran journalist M.A. Zuberi (1920 – 12 December 2010), the newspaper's founder. He was first appointed as an apprentice reporter by Muhammad Ali Jinnah in 1945 at Dawn newspaper in Delhi.

Before the creation of Pakistan in 1947, he had been promoted to the post of senior assistant editor at Dawn newspaper. He continued to work in that position even in Pakistan until 1964. Then he founded his own newspaper Business Recorder in 1965 and thus became one of the pioneers of financial journalism in Pakistan.

== Business Recorder Group holdings ==
=== Printing ===
- Apex Printry (Pvt) Ltd

=== Television Broadcasting ===
==== Recorder Television ====
- Aaj News
- Aaj Entertainment
- Play Entertainment

=== Publishing ===
- Business Recorder (daily business newspaper)
- Emmay Zed Publications (Pvt) Ltd

== See also ==
- List of newspapers in Pakistan
- Pakistan Stock Exchange
