= Council of Pakistan Newspaper Editors =

- شورای مدیران اخبارات پاکستان
- Founded: 1951
- Legal status: Non-Government Organization (NGO)
- Headquarters: Karachi, Pakistan
- Key people: Kazam Khan (President); Amir Mahmood (Secretary General)

The Council of Pakistan Newspaper Editors (CPNE) has worked since its foundation in 1951 as the combined body of newspaper editors in Pakistan to campaign for defence of press freedom and the right of access to information in the service of democratic practice and strengthening of democratic institutions in the country.

However, one editor of the Business Recorder (newspaper) claimed the group was founded in 1958 by the merger of the Pakistan Newspapers Editors Conference and Newspapers Editors Council of Pakistan.

As of 2014, its President is Mujeeb-ur-Rehman Shami. The members of this prestigious organization of the newspaper editors have also adopted a Code of Ethics which lays down the norms for maintaining the dignity of the print media as a non-partisan and professional high standard in member publications in respect of publications of news, views, comments and other write-ups.

== Work ==
The CPNE has been in constant dialogue with the Pakistan Government and the provincial Governments on the subject of press freedom. The President or the Prime Minister of Pakistan have been the chief guests at the annual functions hosted each year by the CPNE to highlight the working of the CPNE and its achievements in the field of securing freedom of press and a working relationship between the CPNE and the government in the service of press freedom and access to information.

CPNE cooperates with other relevant bodies and organizations in Pakistan such as All Pakistan Newspapers Society, Pakistan Bar Council and Pakistan Federal Union of Journalists to issue joint statements on urgent ongoing press freedom and news media issues.

The CPNE has a Media Monitoring Cell and has maintained collaborative relations with several international print media organizations and has also sought the promotion of bilateral and regional ties among the newspaper editor bodies of the countries in the region and the world. In keeping with the UN Charter, the CPNE in its code of ethics has placed great stress on defending fundamental human rights in which access to information is of great and critical significance.

The CPNE has sponsored collaboration at the South Asian Association of Regional Cooperation (also called SAARC) level and at the bilateral level with neighboring countries.

The International Relations Committee of the CPNE seeks expanded bilateral and regional ties in the print media field so that the friendly understanding in the print media field at the level of newspaper editors is further promoted and cemented.

In May 2018, the president of CPNE Arif Nizami and the secretary general Jabbar Khattak expressed their concern over ongoing attempts to impose restrictions on freedom of expression to affect the distribution of newspapers and electronic media transmissions in Pakistan. They made a joint statement to highlight recent attacks by certain elements especially when Pakistan was gearing up for upcoming Pakistani general election, 2018.

In May 2019, Arif Nizami was elected again as president of CPNE.
