= Nawa-i-waqt =

Pakistani newspaper

Nawaiwaqt

- The front page of Nawa-i-waqt, 22 May 2010
- Type: Daily newspaper
- Format: Print, online
- Owners: Majid Nizami Trust; Rameeza Nizami
- Editor: Rameeza Majid Nizami
- Deputy editor: Saeed Aasi
- Founded: Founded in 1940 by Hameed Nizami
- Political alignment: Center-Right-Wing; Vigorously supported Pakistan Movement
- Language: Urdu
- Headquarters: Lahore, Pakistan
- Website: www.nawaiwaqt.com.pk

Nawa-i-Waqt or Nawaiwaqt (Urdu: نوائے وقت; lit. 'The Voice of Time') is one of the largest circulating Urdu-language daily newspaper in Pakistan.

This newspaper is currently owned by 'Majid Nizami Trust'. It was founded by Hameed Nizami and launched under his leadership on 23 March 1940.

Hameed's younger brother Majid Nizami was the chief editor and publisher of Nawa-i-Waqt Group of Publications until he died in 2014 and then this group became the property of Majid Nizami Trust created by Majid Nizami himself in his lifetime.

In 2016, Rameeza (adopted daughter of Majid Nizami) and the biological daughter of Mian Arif and Ghazala Arif was elected as the Managing Director of Nawa-i-Waqt Group of Publications by the trustees of Majid Nizami Trust and she was also elected as the Senior Vice President of All Pakistan Newspapers Society (APNS).

== History ==
Nawa-i-Waqt first came out on 23 March 1940, as a fortnightly periodical. It passionately supported the All India Muslim League. In those days, it had a pro-American and anti-communist stance. The editors were Afaq Hussain Johar, a student of Islamia College, and Shabbar Hasan, a student of King Edward Medical University. They were influenced by a nationalist periodical Aligarh Opinion, which was launched by Syed Sibte Hassan, Khwaja Ahmad Abbas and Ashraf who were close friends of Shabbar Hasan. On 15 December 1942, the fortnightly was turned into a weekly and finally into a daily newspaper on 19 July 1944.

The group which is owned by 'Majid Nizami Trust' has several publications including the flagship Nawa-i-Waqt newspaper in Urdu and The Nation newspaper in English, Nida-i-Millat, a family magazine, and the monthly children's magazine, Phool.

This newspaper had vigorously supported the Pakistan Movement for the creation of Pakistan.

== Waqt News ==
Nawa-i-Waqt Group also operated a 24-hour news channel, Waqt News, from 2007 to 2018. Waqt news again onair from 14 August 2025.

== Staff and columnists ==
Arif Nizami (son of the newspaper founder Hameed Nizami) was a long-time editor of the English-language daily newspaper The Nation but resigned due to differences with his uncle Majid Nizami before his uncle's death in 2014.

== Nawa-i-Waqt Group of Publications ==
Magazines and newspapers published by this company are:

- Phool - monthly magazine for children in Urdu language
- Family Magazine - Weekly for Women in Urdu language
- Nida-i-Millat - a weekly magazine in Urdu language
- The Nation - A daily English newspaper from Lahore, Pakistan

== See also ==
- Waqt News TV Channel
- List of news channels in Pakistan
