= Pakistan Press International =

Pakistani news agency founded 1956

Coordinates: 24°51′18.8″N 67°1′5.9″E

Pakistan Press International (PPI) (Urdu: پاکستان پریس انٹرنیشنل) is a Pakistani news agency first founded in June 1956 as the Pakistan Press Association (PPA).

The name Pakistan Press Association (PPA) was changed in 1968. It was first started by Muazzam Ali, the Chief Editor of Associated Press of Pakistan (APP). The agency objective was to provide competition to APP's monopoly in Pakistan. PPA also built up a network of correspondents in the smaller cities and towns in Pakistan. This was in contrast to APP, which had news coverage only in a limited number of large cities. For foreign news, the agency signed up with the Agence France-Presse (AFP) in 1957, and a year later became the first Asian partner of DPA. The news agency has been criticized for having served as a propaganda tool for the incumbent central government, distributing materials from a vast network of fake news websites and misreporting events.PPA also posted a correspondent in the Middle East, an area of special interest to Pakistani newspapers.

== Major news agencies in Pakistan ==
Pakistan has two major news agencies: the government-controlled Associated Press of Pakistan and the privately owned independent news agency, Pakistan Press International (PPI).

Among the veteran journalists that once worked for PPI were Idrees Bakhtiar and Ashfak Bokhari.

== Staff and news coverage ==
PPI has a staff of over 300 people that covers not only the major cities of Pakistan but also has an extensive coverage of rural Pakistan.

According to ASIANET website, "The agency [Pakistan Press International (PPI)] enjoys the respect of national and international media and has distinguished itself as an instrument of credible, objective, and ethical journalism."

Pakistan's major TV news channels, radio stations, magazines, newspapers and websites use Pakistan Press International (PPI) as their source to gather latest news.
