= All Pakistan Newspapers Society =

Pakistani newspaper organization

- انجمن اخبارات تمام پاکستان
- Predecessor: Pakistan Newspapers Society
- Formation: 1953; 73 years ago
- Headquarters: Karachi
- Coordinates: 24.924151551634086°N 67.11391627690729°E
- President: Nazafreen Saigol Lakhani
- Senior Vice President: Imtinan Shahid
- Vice President: Mohammad Aslam Kazi
- Secretary General: Sarmad Ali
- Website: apns.com.pk

All Pakistan Newspapers Society (APNS) is an organization of major Pakistani newspapers, their publishers, companies, and corporations. It includes the Jang Group of Newspapers, Dawn Group of Newspapers, and Nawa-i-Waqt Group of Newspapers.

== History ==
The Pakistan Newspapers Society was established in 1950. Later, All Pakistan Newspapers Society was established in 1953 and was headed by Hamid Nizami, Mir Khalil-ur-Rahman, Mian Iftikharuddin, Fakhre Matri, Hamid Mahmood, Yusuf Haroon, Mahmud A. Haroon, A.G. Mirza, Kazi Mohammad Akber, Munawwar Hidayet Ullah, K. M. Hamid Ullah, Anwarul Islam of the newspaper Pakistan Observer, Dacca, Syed Hameed Hussain Naqvi, and Tanvir Tahir.

The older organization, Pakistan Newspapers Society was established primarily due to the efforts of Hameed Nizami, Altaf Husain, and Hamid Mahmood. It functioned for a number of years but could not receive much support or recognition either from the publishers or the advertising agencies. Other smaller publishers' organizations also functioned, at the same time, in East Pakistan and Karachi.

In the year 1953, All Pakistan Newspapers Society was formed by merging the smaller existing groups of publishers. The headquarters were established in Karachi, from where it still continues to operate in 2018.

The APNS handles problems between its member publications and the provincial or federal governments relating to advertisements, clearance of dues, taxes and duties and newsprint. It sets rules of conduct for member publications and advertising agencies. This gives the Society a mechanism of streamlining advertisements and a clearance system protecting the collective interests of its member publications, advertising agencies, and advertisers.

The Society also works to develop the science and art of journalism and newspaper industry. In 1981, the APNS instituted advertising awards in various categories. Subsequently, the Journalist Awards were launched in 1982. The awards ceremonies have been held regularly since 1981.

The APNS grew to include publications from small towns and newspapers in regional languages. Between 1971 and 2003, the number of member publications in the Society rose from 41 to 262. Along with organizations of editors and journalists, the Society worked against the Press and Publications Ordinance passed by Ayub Khan in 1960 until it was finally repealed in 1988. In 1999, the APNS prepared a set of press laws including the Draft for the formation of Press Council in Pakistan, Registration of Printing Presses, Newspapers Ordinance and a draft for a Freedom of Information Act. After thorough discussions among the All Pakistan Newspapers Society (APNS) people, Council of Pakistan Newspaper Editors (CPNE) and the Ministry of Information, Government of Pakistan, the drafts on the Press Council and the Registration of Presses and Newspapers were finalized and enacted in 2002.

After 2002, the member publications are trying to adopt modern techniques, facilities, and trained manpower in all fields.

In 2018, All Pakistan Newspapers Society (APNS) asked the Supreme Court of Pakistan to consider Pakistani print media's problems. This action was prompted by the recently expressed fear in the country and reports circulating in the news media that government advertisements in the print media might be stopped or limited. APNS pointed out that the print media in Pakistan, especially the small newspapers, significantly depend on the revenue that comes from these government advertisements.

== Awards of the APNS ==
The Advertising Awards were initiated in 1981, with Journalist Awards following in 1982. Advertising Awards are given on a 1st position, 2nd position, 3rd position basis and include:

- Business Performance Awards
- Client Performance Awards
- Product Launch Award
- Best Copy Award (English and Urdu)
- Best Visual Design (colour and black and white)
- Public Service Campaign
- Lifetime Achievement Award

The Journalist Awards have only one winner in each category. The categories include:

- Best Scoop
- Best Column
- Best Feature (in English, Urdu and Regional languages)
- Best Investigative Report
- Best Cartoon
- Best Photograph
- Best Article (in English, Urdu and Regional languages)

== Elections ==
At the annual meeting of its General Council, members elect the office bearers of the All Pakistan Newspapers Society for the following year.

Term	President	Senior Vice President	Vice President	Secretary General	Ref.
2015–16	Hameed Haroon	Rameeza Majid Nizami	Mumtaz A. Tahir	Sarmad Ali	
2018–19	Hameed Haroon	Kazi Asad Abid	Mehtab Khan	Sarmad Ali	
2019–20	Hameed Haroon			Sarmad Ali	
2021–22	Sarmad Ali	Jamil Ather	Shahab Zuberi	Nazafreen Saigol Lakhani	
2022–23	Sarmad Ali	Jamil Ather	Shahab Zuberi	Nazafreen Saigol Lakhani	
