= The Nation (Pakistan) =

English-language daily newspaper based in Lahore, Pakistan

- Type: Daily newspaper
- Format: Print, online
- Founder: Majid Nizami
- Publisher: Nawa-i-Waqt Group of Publications by Majid Nizami Trust
- Editor: Rameeza Nizami
- Founded: 1986
- Language: English
- Headquarters: Lahore, Pakistan
- Website: www.nation.com.pk

The Nation is an English-language daily newspaper owned by Majid Nizami Trust and based in Lahore, Pakistan.

Rameeza Nizami is the executive editor of The Nation. She is the adopted daughter of the Pakistani journalist, Majid Nizami (3 April 1928 – 26 July 2014).

This newspaper is published daily from Lahore, Islamabad, Multan and Karachi.
