= Political views of Osama bin Laden =

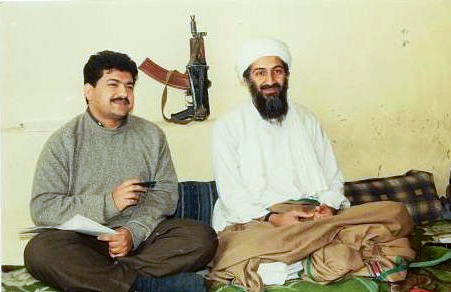
Bin Laden interviewed by Pakistani journalist Hamid Mir, c. 1997-98

Osama bin Laden took ideological guidance from prominent militant Islamist scholars and ideologues from the classical to contemporary eras, such as Ibn Taymiyya, Ibn al-Qayyim al-Jawziyyah, Sayyid Qutb, Nizamuddin Shamzai and Abdullah Azzam. During his middle and high school years, bin Laden was educated in Al-Thager Model School, a public school in Jeddah run by Islamist exiles of the Muslim Brotherhood; during which he was immensely influenced by pan-Islamist ideals and displayed strict religious commitment. As a teenager, bin Laden attended and led Muslim Brotherhood-run "Awakening" camps held on desert outskirts that intended to raise the youth in religious values, instil martial spirit and sought spiritual seclusion from "the corruptions" of modernity and rapidly urbanising society of the 1970s in Saudi Arabia.

Bin Laden subscribed to the Athari school of Islamic theology. During his studies in King Abdulaziz University, bin Laden became immersed in the writings of the Egyptian militant Islamist scholar Sayyid Qutb; most notably Milestones and In The Shade of the Qur'an. Bin Laden adopted Qutb's anti-Westernism, his assertion that the Muslim World has been steeped in a state of Jahiliyyah (pre-Islamic ignorance) and embraced his revolutionary call for overthrowing the Arab governments by means of an ideologically committed vanguard.

To effectuate his beliefs, Osama bin Laden founded al-Qaeda, a pan-Islamist militant organization, with the objective of recruiting Muslim youth for participating in armed Jihad across various regions of the Islamic world such as Palestine, Kashmir, Central Asia, etc. In conjunction with several other Islamic leaders, he issued two fatwas—in 1996 and then again in 1998—that Muslims should fight those that either support Israel or any Western military forces in Islamic countries, stating that those in that mindset are the enemy, including citizens from the United States and allied countries. His goal was for Western military forces to withdraw from the Middle East and for foreign aid to Israel to cease as the aid is used to fund Israeli policy in the region.

== Sharia ==
Following a form of Islamism, bin Laden believed that the restoration of God's law will set things right in the Muslim world. He stated, "When we used to follow Muhammad's revelation we were in great happiness and in great dignity, to Allah belongs the credit and praise." He believed "the only Islamic country" in the Muslim world was Afghanistan under the rule of Mullah Omar's Taliban before that regime was overthrown in late 2001.

== Differences with Wahhabi ideology ==
Bin Laden's connection with contemporary Wahhabi Islam is disputed. Although a BBC reporter labelled bin Laden as a "Wahhabi" in 2001, other researchers have disputed such characterizations. Many academics have asserted that Bin Laden's ideology is different in crucial ways. While modern Wahhabi doctrine states that only political leaders can call for jihad, bin Laden believed he could declare jihad. Modern Wahhabism forbids disobedience to a ruler unless the ruler has commanded his/her subjects to violate religious commandments.

A number of Islamists have asserted that bin Laden has no direct connections with Wahhabism, although he may have been inspired by the movement of Muhammad ibn 'Abd al- Wahhab and its ideals. Bin Laden's Yemeni origins also point to a non-Wahhabi background. Moreover, many Wahhabi Shaykhs are strongly opposed to war-tactics like suicide bombings justified by the Al-Qaeda ideologues, viewing such attacks as "un-Islamic". During his stay in Afghanistan in the 1990s, Bin Laden was also strongly influenced by the prominent Deobandi Islamic scholar Nizamuddin Shamzai.

Furthermore, the main goals of bin Laden were different to that of most contemporary Wahhabis. Bin Laden was most interested in "resisting western domination and combating regimes that fail to rule according to Islamic law," while Wahhabism focuses on correct methods of worshiping God, removing idols, and ensuring adherence to Islamic law. Bin Laden adopted a Salafi-leaning "live and let live" approach and worked together with followers of other Islamic schools to advance Islamist goals. In line with his pan-Islamist outlook, Bin Laden maintained a close friendship with Mawlawi Yunus Khalis, a Sufi mystic and Afghan insurgent who facilitated Bin Laden's return to Afghanistan in May 1996 and offered him asylum. Despite Khalis' adherence to Sufi spirituality, Bin Laden lauded him as a "tiger" who fought bravely in defense of Muslims during the Afghan Jihad.

On the other hand, Israeli diplomat Dore Gold claimed in 2003 that Bin Laden "adopted Wahhabi terminology" when he described America as "the Hubal of the age", since Hubal was a stone idol and idolatry (shirk) is heavily opposed by Wahhabis. According to Jonathan Sozek:

"Salafism can be understood as an umbrella term under which a movement like Wahhabism might be placed. Not everyone who identifies with Salafism is a Wahhabi... . Bin Laden himself has identified himself with Salafism (meaning little more, perhaps, than a Christian identifying themselves as an evangelical), but this says nothing as to his relationship to Wahhabism."

== Jihad ==
[Hamid Mir]: Can it be said that you are against the American government, not the American people? [Bin Laden]: "Yes! We are carrying on the mission of our Prophet, Muhammad (peace be upon him). The mission is to spread the word of God, not to indulge massacring people. We ourselves are the target of killings, destruction and atrocities. We are only defending ourselves. This is defensive Jihad. We want to defend our people and our land. That is why I say that if we don't get security, the Americans, too would not get security.
This is a simple formula that even an American child can understand. This is the formula of live and let live."

— Bin Laden's interview with Pakistani journalist Hamid Mir, November 2001

Jihad, a common Arabic word meaning to "strife" or "struggle", is referred to in the Qur'an to indicate that Muslims must be willing to exert effort in the cause of God, using their wealth and themselves. It refers to the internal struggle to be a better Muslim, the struggle between good and evil. In a January 2004 message bin Laden called for the establishment of provisional underground ruling councils in Muslim countries to be made up of "ulema, leaders who are obeyed among their people, dignitaries, nobles, and merchants." The councils would be sure "the people" had "easy access to arms, particularly light weapons; anti-armored rockets, such as RPGs; and anti-tank mines" to fight "raids" by "the Romans", i.e. United States.

His interviews, video messages and other communications always mentioned and almost always dwelt on need for jihad to right what he believed were injustices against Muslims by the United States and sometimes other non-Muslim states, the need to eliminate the state of Israel, and to force the withdrawal of the U.S. from the Middle East. Occasionally other issues arose; he called for Americans to "reject the immoral acts of fornication, homosexuality, intoxicants, gambling, and usury", in an October 2002 letter.

Former CIA officer and chief of Bin Laden Issue Station, Michael Scheuer writes:

"In the context of the ideas Bin Laden shares with his brethren, the military actions of Al-Qaeda and its allies... are part of a defensive jihad sanctioned by the revealed word of God... bin Laden believes Islam is being attacked by America and its allies and is simply recognizing his responsibility to fight in a defensive jihad. Further, bin Laden is calling on other Muslims to similarly identify the threat and to do their duty to God and their brethren... Having defined the threat to Islam as the U.S.-led crusaders' attacks and prescribing a defensive jihad as the only appropriate response, bin Laden regards al Qaeda as having an important role to play—"the vanguard of a Muslim nation"

== Grievances against countries ==
=== East Timor ===
In his November 2001 statement, bin Laden criticized the United Nations and Australian "Crusader" forces for ensuring the independence of the mostly Catholic East Timor from the mostly Muslim state of Indonesia.

=== India ===
Bin Laden considered India to be a part of the 'Crusader-Zionist-Hindu' conspiracy against the Islamic world.

=== Saudi Arabia ===
Bin Laden was born in Saudi Arabia and had a close relationship with the Saudi royal family, but his opposition to the Saudi government stemmed from his radical ideology. The Saudi decision to allow the U.S. military into the country in 1990 to defend against a possible attack by Saddam Hussein upset bin Laden, although he was not necessarily opposed to the royal family at this time or going to war with Iraq and even offered to send his mujahedeen from Afghanistan to defend Saudi Arabia from an Iraqi attack, an offer which was rebuked by King Fahd. From his point of view, "for the Muslim Saudi monarchy to invite non-Muslim American troops to fight against Muslim Iraqi soldiers was a serious violation of Islamic law".

Bin Laden, in his 1996 fatwa entitled "Declaration of War against the Americans Occupying the Land of the Two Holy Places", identified several grievances that he had about Saudi Arabia, the birthplace and holy land of Islam:

1. The intimidation and harassment suffered by the leaders of the society, the scholars, heads of tribes, merchants, academic teachers and other eminent individuals;
2. The situation of the law within the country and the arbitrary declaration of what is Halal and Haram (lawful and unlawful) regardless of the Shari'ah as instituted by Allah;
3. The state of the press and the media which became a tool of truth-hiding and misinformation; the media carried out the plan of the enemy of idolising cult of certain personalities and spreading scandals among the believers to repel the people away from their religion, as Allah, the Exalted said: {surely – as for – those who love that scandal should circulate between the believers, they shall have a grievous chastisement in this world and in the here after} (An-Noor, 24:19).
4. Abuse and confiscation of human rights;
5. The financial and the economic situation of the country and the frightening future in the view of the enormous amount of debts and interest owed by the government; this is at the time when the wealth of the Ummah being wasted to satisfy personal desires of certain individuals!! while imposing more custom duties and taxes on the nation. (the prophet said about the woman who committed adultery: "She repented in such a way sufficient to bring forgiveness to a custom collector!!").
6. The miserable situation of the social services and infra-structure especially the water service and supply, the basic requirement of life.,
7. The state of the ill-trained and ill-prepared army and the impotence of its commander in chief despite the incredible amount of money that has been spent on the army. The gulf war clearly exposed the situation.,
8. Shari'a law was suspended and man made law was used instead.
9. And as far as the foreign policy is concerned the report exposed not only how this policy has disregarded the Islamic issues and ignored the Muslims, but also how help and support were provided to the enemy against the Muslims; the cases of Gaza-Ariha and the communist in the south of Yemen are still fresh in the memory, and more can be said.

Bin Laden wanted to overthrow the Saudi monarchy (and the governments of Middle Eastern states) and establish an Islamic state according to Shari'a law (Islamic Holy Law), to "unite all Muslims and to establish a government which follows the rule of the Caliphs."

=== Soviet Union ===
In 1979, bin Laden opposed the Soviet Union's invasion of Afghanistan and would soon heed the call to arms by Afghan freedom fighters. Bin Laden would use his own independent wealth and resources to get fighters from Egypt, Lebanon, Kuwait and Turkey to join the Afghans in their battle against the Soviets. While bin Laden praised the U.S. intervention early on, being happy that the Afghans were getting aid from all over the world to battle the Soviets, his view of the U.S. soon grew sour, stating "Personally neither I nor my brothers saw evidence of American help. When my mujahedin were victorious and the Russians were driven out, differences started..." In 1993, bin Laden stated to The Independent that "we believe that God used our holy war in Afghanistan to destroy the Russian army and the Soviet Union".

=== United Kingdom ===
Bin Laden believed that Israeli Jews controlled the British government, directing it to kill as many Muslims as it could. He cited British participation in 1998's Operation Desert Fox as proof of this allegation.

=== United States ===
Osama Bin Laden condemned United States as the head of the "Zionist-Crusader alliance" that is waging war against Muslims across the world. In particular, Bin Laden was fiercely opposed to the stationing of US troops in the Arabian Peninsula and urged Muslims to rise up in armed Jihad and expel American forces from Muslim lands. He asserted that it is the religious duty of all Muslims to fight defensive Jihad against United States and resist the numerous acts of American aggression against the Muslim World.

Numerous crimes of United States listed by Bin Laden included the sanctions against Iraq which resulted in hundreds of thousands of deaths, arms embargo in Bosnia which led to the Bosnian genocide, as well as massacres committed by US military and its allies in Somalia, Tajikistan, Palestine, Kashmir, Philippines, etc. In Al-Qaeda's "Declaration of War Against the Americans Occupying the Land of the Two Holy Places", also known as the "Ladenese Epistle", Osama Bin Laden stated:

"It is no secret to you, my brothers, that the people of Islam have been afflicted with oppression, hostility, and injustice by the Judeo-Christian alliance and its supporters. This shows our enemies' belief that Muslims' blood is the cheapest and that their property and wealth is merely loot. Your blood has been spilt in Palestine and Iraq, and the horrific image of the massacre in Qana in Lebanon are still fresh in people's minds. The massacres that have taken place in Tajikistan, Burma, Kashmir, Assam, the Philippines, Fatani, Ogaden, Somalia, Eritrea, Chechnya, Kosovo and Bosnia-Herzegovina send shivers down our spines and stir up our passions. All this has happened before the eyes and ears of the world, but the blatant imperial arrogance of America, under the cover of the immoral United Nations, has prevented the dispossessed from arming themselves. So the people of Islam realized that they were the fundamental target of the hostility of the Judeo-Crusader alliance."

— "Declaration of War Against the Americans Occupying the Land of the Two Holy Places", (23 August 1996),

Bin Laden's stated motivations of the September 11 attacks include the support of Israel by the United States, the presence of the U.S. military in the sacred Islamic lands of the Arabian Peninsula, and the U.S. enforcement of sanctions against Iraq. He first called for jihad against the United States in 1996. This call solely focused on U.S. troops in Saudi Arabia; bin Laden loathed their presence and wanted them removed in a "rain of bullets".

Denouncing Americans as "the worst thieves in the world today and the worst terrorists", Bin Laden mocked American accusations of "terrorism" against Al-Qaeda. Bin Laden's hatred and disdain for the U.S. were also manifested while he lived in Sudan. There he told Al-Qaeda fighters-in-training:

"America appeared so mighty ... but it was actually weak and cowardly. Look at Vietnam, look at Lebanon. Whenever soldiers start coming home in body bags, Americans panic and retreat. Such a country needs only to be confronted with two or three sharp blows, then it will flee in panic, as it always has. ... It cannot stand against warriors of faith who do not fear death."

In order to fight the U.S., apart the military option, he also called for asceticism as well as economic boycott, as during this August 1996 speech in the Hindu Kush mountains:

"… in particular, we remind them of the following: the wealth you devote to the purchase price of American goods will be transformed into bullets shot into the breasts of our brothers in Palestine, in the Land of the Two Holy Sanctuaries, and elsewhere. In buying their goods we strengthen their economy while exacerbating our own poverty and weakness (...) we expect the women of the Land of the Two Holy Sanctuaries and elsewhere to carry out their role by practicing asceticism from the world, and by boycotting American goods. If economic boycotting is combined with the strugglers’ military operations, then the defeat of the enemy would be even nearer, by God’s permission. The opposite is also true: If Muslims do not cooperate with the struggling brothers, supplying them with assistance in curtailing economic collaboration with the American enemy, then they are supplying them with wealth that is the mainstay of war and the lifeblood of armies. In effect, they extend the period of war and abet the oppression of Muslims."

==== Grievances against the United States ====
In his 1998 fatwa entitled "Jihad Against Jews and Crusaders" bin Laden identified three grievances against the U.S.:

First, for over seven years the United States has been occupying the lands of Islam in the holiest of places, the Arabian Peninsula, plundering its riches, dictating to its rulers, humiliating its people, terrorizing its neighbors, and turning its bases in the Arabian Peninsula into a spearhead through which to fight the neighboring Muslim people of Iraq.

If some people have in the past argued about the fact of the occupation, all the people of the Peninsula have now acknowledged it. The best proof of this is the Americans' continuing aggression against the Iraqi people using the Peninsula as a staging post, even though all its rulers are against their territories being used to that end, but they are helpless.

Second, despite the great devastation inflicted on the Iraqi people by the crusader-Zionist alliance, and despite the huge number of those killed, which has exceeded 1 million... despite all this, the Americans are once against trying to repeat the horrific massacres, as though they are not content with the protracted blockade imposed after the ferocious war or the fragmentation and devastation.

So here they come to annihilate what is left of this people and to humiliate their Muslim neighbors.

Third, if the Americans' aims behind these wars are religious and economic, the aim is also to serve the Jews' petty state and divert attention from its occupation of Jerusalem and murder of Muslims there. The best proof of this is their eagerness to destroy Iraq, the strongest neighboring Arab state, and their endeavor to fragment all the states of the region such as Iraq, Saudi Arabia, Egypt, and Sudan into paper statelets and through their disunion and weakness to guarantee Israel's survival and the continuation of the brutal crusade occupation of the Peninsula.

Bin Laden criticized the United States in a "letter to the American people" published in late 2002, and further outlined his grievances with the United States in a 2004 speech directed towards the American people.

==== Criticism of American media ====
Bin Laden had a negative opinion of American mass media, and he accused American news-outlets and journalists of attempting to incite the "innocent and good-hearted people in the West" to wage war against Muslims. He further asserted that voices of those Westerners who opposed US wars of aggression were suppressed by the American deep state and pro-Zionist lobbies.

==== Favored American authors ====
In 2011, in a review of a new book from former CIA officer Michael Scheuer, professor and writer Fouad Ajami wrote that "in 2007, [bin Laden] singled out two western authors whose knowledge he had high regard for: Scheuer and Noam Chomsky. Additionally, bin Laden recommended Rogue State by William Blum and Obama's Wars by Bob Woodward.

==== John F. Kennedy conspiracy theory ====
Bin Laden supported the conspiracy theory that John F. Kennedy was killed by the "owners of the major corporations who were benefiting from its (Vietnam War) continuation":

In the Vietnam War, the leaders of the White House claimed at the time that it was a necessary and crucial war, and during it, Donald Rumsfeld and his aides murdered two million villagers. And when Kennedy took over the presidency and deviated from the general line of policy drawn up for the White House and wanted to stop this unjust war, that angered the owners of the major corporations who were benefiting from its continuation. And so Kennedy was killed, and al-Qaida wasn't present at that time, but rather, those corporations were the primary beneficiary from his killing. And the war continued after that for approximately one decade. But after it became clear to you that it was an unjust and unnecessary war, you made one of your greatest mistakes, in that you neither brought to account nor punished those who waged this war, not even the most violent of its murderers, Rumsfeld.

== Military strategy ==
=== Targeting strategy ===
Osama bin Laden's military strategy supported the indiscriminate targeting of Americans, as retaliation against US military's attacks against Muslim women and children. He asserted that the US policy was to perpetrate scorched-earth tactics against its enemies, which killed civilians as well as combatants recklessly, and hence balanced retaliatory measures targeting American civilians was justified. Bin Laden denounced American accusations of terrorism against Al-Qaeda as part of a campaign of psychological warfare against Muslims who wanted to support armed resistance and join the Jihad against "Israeli-American occupation of Islamic sacred lands".

Some examples of American state terrorism condemned by Bin Laden included Hiroshima and Nagasaki atomic bombings, US support to Israeli massacres in Lebanon, sanctions against Iraq which resulted in hundreds of thousands of deaths, arms embargo against Bosnia, etc. Responding to American allegations of terrorism, Bin Laden stated in a November 1996 interview published by the "Nida'ul Islam" magazine:

"As for their accusations [that we] terrorize the innocent, the children, and the women, these fall into the category of "accusing others of their own affliction in order to fool the masses." The evidence overwhelmingly shows America and Israel killing the weaker men, women, and children in the Muslim world and elsewhere. ... Despite the continuing American occupation of the country of the two sacred mosques, America continues to claim that it is upholding the banner of freedom and humanity, yet it perpetrated deeds which you would not find the most ravenous of animals debasing themselves to do."

In a March 1997 interview with CNN journalist Peter Arnett, Bin Laden stated that US soldiers were the primary targets of Jihad against America and demanded all American nationals to leave Saudi Arabia. While maintaining that American civilians were not targeted to be attacked as part of al-Qaeda's 1996 declaration of war against USA, Bin Laden stated:

"... we have focused our declaration on striking at the soldiers in the country of The Two Holy Places. The country of the Two Holy Places has in our religion a peculiarity of its own over the other Muslim countries. In our religion, it is not permissible for any non-Muslim to stay in our country. Therefore, even though American civilians are not targeted in our plan, they must leave. We do not guarantee their safety, because we are in a society of more than a billion Muslims. A reaction might take place as a result of the US government's targeting of Muslim civilians and executing more than 600,000 Muslim children in Iraq by preventing food and medicine from reaching them. So, the US is responsible for any reaction, because it extended its war against troops to civilians."

In a 1998 interview, Bin stated that al-Qaeda fighters distinguished "between men and women, and between children and old people" during warfare; unlike hypocritical "infidels" who "preach one thing and do another." During the same interview, Bin Laden denied direct involvement in launching the 1998 US embassy bombings in East Africa, while praising the attacks as "a popular response" from Muslim youth fighting against American imperialism. In an interview with Tayseer Allouni on 21 October 2001, Bin Laden stated that those who say "killing a child is not valid" in Islam "speak without any knowledge of Islamic law", asserting that non-Muslim enemies can be targeted indiscriminately if they killed Muslim women and children. Thus, Bin Laden advocated the targeting of all Americans in retaliation against the indiscriminate military attacks of United States against Muslim populations. He further asserted that all Americans are guilty of their government's war against Muslims, arguing that American people elected these governments and paid taxes that funded the aggressive acts of US military.

When he was asked about the Muslims killed in the September 11 attacks, bin Laden replied that "Islamic law says that Muslim should not stay long in the land of infidels". In addition to maintaining that the strikes were not directed against women and children and asserting that the primary targets of the 9/11 attacks were the symbols of American "economic and military power", Bin Laden stated: "This is a significant issue in Islamic jurisprudence. According to my information, if the enemy occupies an Islamic land and uses its people as human shields, a person has the right to attack the enemy. In the same way, if some thieves broke into a house and took a child hostage to protect themselves, the father has the right to attack the thieves, even if the child gets hurt. The United States and their allies are killing us in Palestine, Chechnya, Kashmir and Iraq."

While recognising civilian fatalities as inevitable during warfare, Bin Laden counseled fighters to avoid attacks that deliberately targeted civilians on a sectarian basis and argued that such attacks were "counter-productive". According to former al-Qaeda member Nasser al-Bahri, Bin Laden consistently advised al-Qaeda commanders to focus their attacks against enemy combatants, and steer clear of attacks against non-combatant civilians. Despite his populist rhetoric denouncing the aggression of "Crusaders and Jews", Bin Laden was opposed to the deliberate targeting of Jewish or Christian women and children; and advised Muslim fighters to focus on attacking Christian and Jewish combatants during warfare.

== Other ideologies ==
In his messages, bin Laden has opposed "pan-Arabism, socialism, communism, democracy and other doctrines," with the exception of Islam. Democracy and "legislative councils of representatives," are denounced, calling the first "the religion of ignorance," and the second "councils of polytheism." In some cases he has also praised the principle of governmental "accountability," however.

=== Capitalism ===
As late as 1993, bin Laden implicitly accepted neoliberal market competition: in an interview, he stated that he would not participate in militancy in Sudan so that he could focus on the construction of a highway. By 1997, however, bin Laden evolved into a critic of capitalism. Before and after the September 11 attacks, he encouraged Muslims to boycott the American financial system. Bin Laden viewed the United States' capitalist economic model as enabling state capture, high interest rates, and climate change, but was not a socialist.

=== Opposition to music ===
Bin Laden opposed music on religious grounds. Despite his love of horse racing and ownership of racing horses, the presence of a band and music at the Khartoum race track annoyed him so much that he stopped attending races in Sudan. "Music is the flute of the devil," he told his Sudanese stable-mate Issam Turabi. Despite his hatred for music, Bin Laden reportedly had a celebrity crush on American singer Whitney Houston, and, according to poet and activist Kola Boof, wanted to make her one of his wives.

=== Polygamy and procreation ===
Bin Laden was a pronatalist and polygamist.

=== Support for environmentalism ===
2002 was the first known time that bin Laden spoke publicly about climate change, urging the United States to sign the Kyoto Protocol. In 2009, bin Laden wrote a letter to Americans that addressed climate change issues. The letter, which was uncovered in May 2011 following the raid of his compound, asked Americans to fight back against climate change, saying that letting then-president Barack Obama address climate change issues was "a rational decision to save humanity from the harmful gases that threaten its destiny". In the same letter, bin Laden wrote that fighting climate change was a higher priority than fighting Islam. He also urged Muslims to find solutions to water pollution and famine in the Arab world, and also called for a boycott of American goods and the destruction of the American economy as a way of fighting global warming.

In 2010 bin Laden publicly spoke about climate change, stating that "discussing climate change is not an intellectual luxury, but a reality". He also criticized the United States and other developed countries for being responsible for the rapid acceleration of climate change. A recording of the speech was given to Al Jazeera, where it was shared with the public. The audio recording went viral on right-wing media outlets like the Drudge Report and RedState, with the latter comparing Osama bin Laden to environmentalist Al Gore.

Millions of children are out in the open air, lacking basic elements of living, including drinking water, resulting in their bodies shedding liquids and subsequently their death," he said. "The huge climate change is affecting our [Islamic] nation and is causing great catastrophes throughout the Islamic world.

— Osama bin Laden

In a March 2019 publication of The New Arab, Nelly Lahoud, a member of the New America think tank, stated that "the fact that bin Laden's public concern about protecting the environment is also reflected in his private communications with other Qaeda and jihadi leaders suggests that he took this issue seriously". The Guardian journalist Nazry Bahrawi wrote in 2010 that bin Laden's environmentalism "is rooted in an apocalyptic vision of the future".

=== Technology ===
On the subject of technology, bin Laden is said to have ambivalent feelings – being interested in "earth-moving machinery and genetic engineering of plants, on the one hand," but rejecting "chilled water on the other." In Afghanistan, his sons' education reportedly eschewed the arts and technology and amounted to "little other than memorizing the Quran all day".

=== Masturbation ===
Osama Bin Laden was reported to have asserted that masturbation was justifiable in "extreme" cases.

In a letter (dated December 2010) to a North African commander of Al-Qaeda known as "Abu Muhammad Salah", Bin Laden wrote:

"Another very special and top secret matter (eyes only you, my brother Abu Muhammad Salah and Samir): it pertains to the problem of the brothers who are with you in their unfortunate celibacy and lack of availability of wives for them in the conditions that have been imposed on them. We pray to God to release them. I wrote to Shaykh/Doctor (Ayman), and I consulted with Shaykh (Abu Yahya). Dr. Ayman has written us his opinion... As we see it, we have no objection to clarifying to the brothers that they may, in such conditions, masturbate, since this is an extreme case. The ancestors approved this for the community. They advised the young men at the time of the conquest to do so. It has also been prescribed by the legists when needed, and there is no doubt that the brothers are in a state of extreme need. However, for those who are not accustomed to such a thing and are ashamed... it may negatively affect his understanding."

=== Accusations of porn-storage by US officials ===
Following Bin Laden's assassination, US officials, talking in context of anonymity, claimed to Western media that pornographic files were discovered in the computers of the raided Abbottabad compound. However, the officials did not offer comments or evidence as to whether Bin Laden and his associates living inside the complex themselves had obtained the files or observed its contents.

== Jews, Christians, and Shia Muslims ==
Bin Laden delivered many warnings against alleged Jewish conspiracies: "These Jews are masters of usury and leaders in treachery. They will leave you nothing, either in this world or the next." Nevertheless, Bin Laden denounced the European persecutions against Jews and blamed the horrors of the Holocaust on the morality of Western culture:

"the morality and culture of the holocaust is your culture, not our culture. In fact, burning living beings is forbidden in our religion, even if they be small like the ant, so what of man?! The holocaust of the Jews was carried out by your brethren in the middle of Europe, but had it been closer to our countries, most of the Jews would have been saved by taking refuge with us. And my proof for that is in what your brothers, the Spanish, did when they set up the horrible courts of the Inquisition to try Muslims and Jews, when the Jews only found safe shelter by taking refuge in our countries. ... They are alive with us and we have not incinerated them, but we are a people who don’t sleep under oppression and reject humiliation and disgrace..."

At the same time, bin Laden's organization worked with Shia militants: "Every Muslim, from the moment they realize the distinction in their hearts, hates Americans, hates Jews, and hates Israelis. This is a part of our belief and our religion." It was apparently inspired by the successes of Shia radicalism—such as the 1979 Iranian Revolution, the implementation of Sharia by Ayatollah Khomeini, and the human wave attacks committed by radical Shia teenagers in the 1980s During The Iran–Iraq War. This point of view may have been influenced by the fact that Bin Laden's mother belonged to the Shia sect. While in Sudan, "senior managers in al Qaeda maintained contacts with" Shia Iran and Hezbollah, its closely allied Shia "worldwide terrorist organization. ... Al Qaeda members received advice and training from Hezbollah." where they are thought to have borrowed the techniques of suicide and simultaneous bombing. Because of the Shia-Sunni schism, this collaboration could only go so far. According to the US 9/11 Commission Report, Iran was rebuffed when it tried to strengthen relations with al Qaeda after the October 2000 attack on USS Cole, "because Bin Laden did not want to alienate his supporters in Saudi Arabia."

== See also ==
- War on terror
- Islamism
