= Hamid Mir =

Pakistani journalist, columnist, and writer (born 1966)

- حامد میر
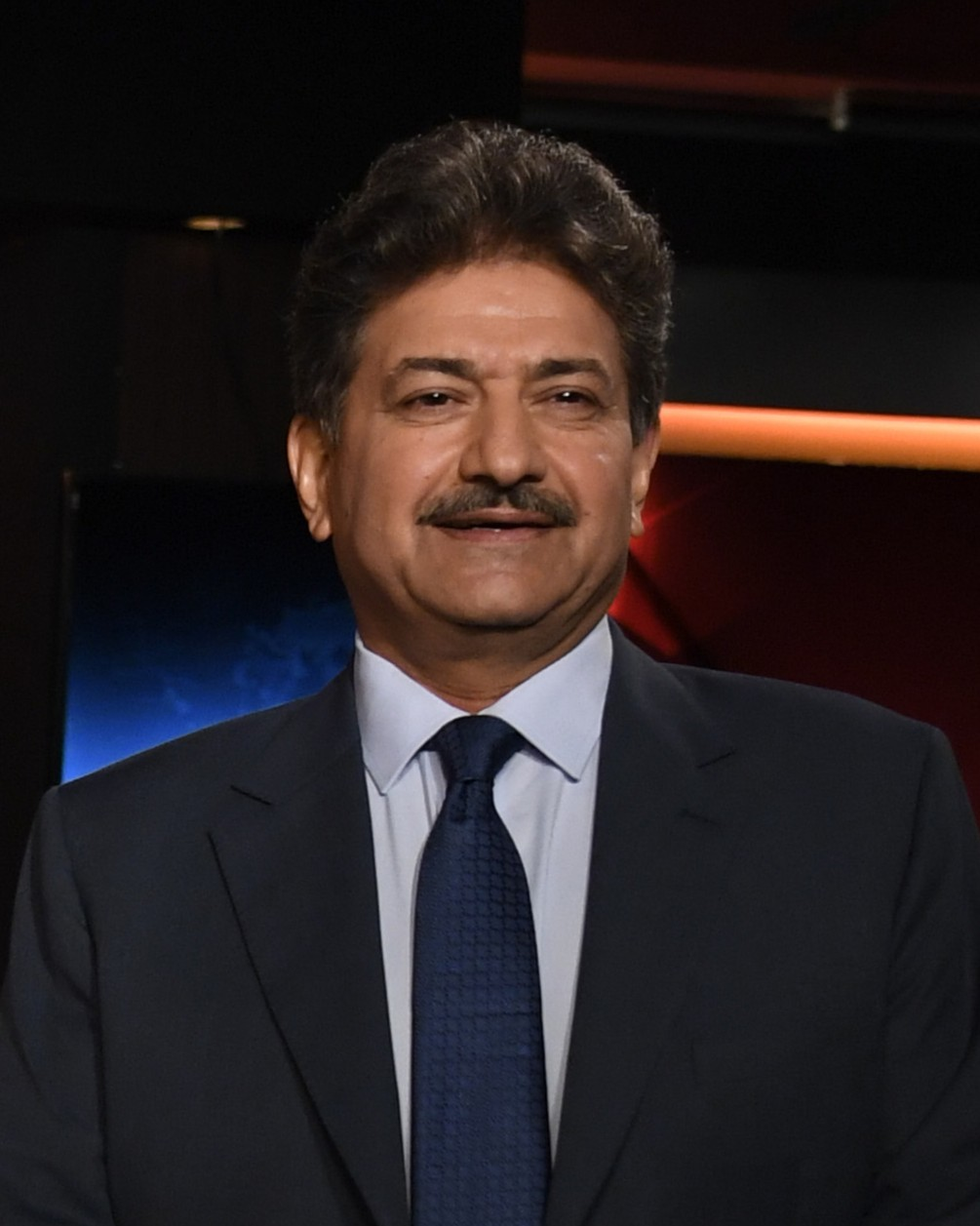
- Mir in 2026
- Born: 23 July 1966 (age 60); Lahore, Punjab, Pakistan
- Education: Masters
- Alma mater: University of Punjab; Government College University; Government College of Science
- Occupations: Journalist; writer
- Years active: 1987–present
- Employer: Geo News (2002–present)
- Known for: Interviewing Osama bin Laden
- Television: Capital Talk
- Spouse: Naheed Hamid
- Children: 2
- Parents: Waris Mir (father); Mumtaz Mir (mother)
- Relatives: Amir Mir (brother); Huma Mir (sister)
- Awards: Hilal-i-Imtiaz (Crescent of Excellence) Award (2013) by the President of Pakistan

Hamid Mir (Note: Urdu: حامد میر) (born 23 July 1966) is a Pakistani journalist, columnist, political writer, and a national security expert. Mir initially worked as a journalist with Pakistani newspapers. He has hosted the political talk show Capital Talk on Geo News intermittently since 2002. He writes columns for Urdu as well as English newspapers, both national and international. He has been a contributor to the Global Opinions section of The Washington Post since June 2021. He is known for his stance against the dominance of the Establishment in Pakistan. Having survived two assassination attempts, Mir has been banned from television three times, and has lost his job twice due to his stand for press freedom and human rights.

Born in Lahore to a journalistic family, Mir is one of the few journalists in the world to have interviewed Osama bin Laden after the September 11 attacks along with Tayseer Allouni. During his career, Mir has also interviewed various world leaders which includes former UN Secretary-General Ban Ki Moon, US Secretary of State John Kerry, US Secretary of State Hillary Clinton, Prime Minister of United Kingdom Tony Blair, US Secretary of State Colin Powell, President of South Africa Nelson Mandela, President of Iran Mahmoud Ahmadinejad, US Secretary of State Condoleezza Rice, President of Palestine Yasser Arafat, Deputy Prime Minister of India L.K. Advani, President of Afghanistan Hamid Karzai, and President of Israel Shimon Peres. A few of the notable Pakistani political figures which Hamid Mir has interviewed include Benazir Bhutto, Pervez Musharraf, Asif Ali Zardari, Nawaz Sharif, Imran Khan, Mir Zafaruallah Khan Jamali, and Arif Alvi. Mir has also interviewed actors such as Shah Rukh Khan and Aamir Khan.

He was awarded with the civil award Hilal-i-Imtiaz for his work for Pakistan. In 2016, he was awarded the "Most Resilient Journalist Award" in The Hague by Free Press Unlimited. In 2017, he was awarded the lifetime achievement award by former Prime Minister Zafarullah Khan Jamali, at Government College University Lahore, for his work as a news anchor.

Hamid Mir is the only journalist in South Asia to cover wars and conflicts in Afghanistan, Iraq, Lebanon, Syria, Palestine, Bosnia and Sri Lanka. For his war and conflict reporting, he was awarded SAARC Lifetime Achievement Award in 2010 in New Delhi.

Hamid Mir is regular participant in international seminars and conferences on security, human rights and press freedom. He has delivered lectures at Harvard University, Yale University, University of Oxford, London School of Economics and University of California, Berkeley.

== Early, personal and family life ==
Hamid Mir's grandfather was Mir Abdul Aziz from Sialkot, who was a poet in Punjabi, Urdu and Persian. Mir's father, Waris Mir, was also a columnist for Daily Jang and Mir's mother was Mumtaz Mir, who migrated to Pakistan from Jammu in the region of Jammu and Kashmir in 1947. His father died on 9 July 1987 in Lahore and his mother died in 1993. Hamid Mir studied at Government College University and University of Punjab.

Mir is married to Naheed Hamid, who worked with Pakistan television and for a private television channel for many years. The couple has two children. His two children and wife spent some time outside of the country because of security issues in 2007.

== Journalistic career ==
=== Daily Jang ===
Mir joined the Daily Jang (Lahore) in 1987 and worked there as sub-editor, reporter, feature writer and edition in charge. In 1990, Mir was abducted, beaten and driven to a house where his captors demanded to know his source for the critical story he wrote when then President Ghulam Ishaq Khan was planning to dismiss the Bhutto government. In 1994, he broke the submarines purchase scandal. Some close friends of Asif Zardari (husband of then Prime Minister Benazir Bhutto) were involved in that scandal, along with some Navy officials. Mir lost his job from the Daily Jang the day his article was published.

=== Daily Pakistan ===
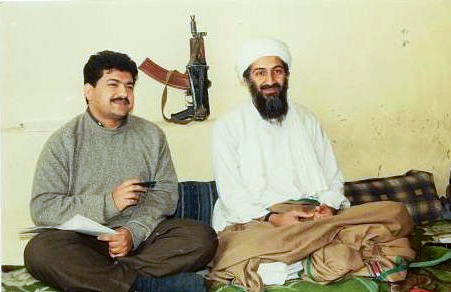
Mir interviewing al-Qaeda leader Osama bin Laden in 1997

In 1996, Mir became the editor of the Daily Pakistan in Islamabad, making him the youngest editor of any national Urdu newspaper in the history of Pakistani journalism. He lost his job again in 1997, when he wrote an article in the Daily Pakistan about the alleged corruption of Prime Minister Nawaz Sharif. Also on 25 December 1997, he launched Daily Ausaf (Islamabad) as founding editor.

Mir was the first Pakistani journalist to interview Osama bin Laden. He first interviewed Bin Laden for the Daily Pakistan in March 1997, in a cave of Tora Bora mountains in eastern Afghanistan. Mir interviewed Bin Laden for the second time for Ausaf in May 1998, in a hideout near the Kandahar International Airport. Mir was one of the few journalists along with Allouni to interview Bin Laden after the 11 September attacks. Mir interviewed Bin Laden for the third time for Dawn and Ausaf on 8 November 2001, at an undisclosed location near Kabul.

Mir went to eastern Afghanistan, where he investigated the escape of Osama bin Laden from Tora Bora mountains in December 2001. Mir visited the caves of bin Laden, during the American bombing. Mir also alleged that it was U.S.-backed Northern Alliance leader Hazrat Ali who provided safe passage to bin Laden after getting a huge bribe. He has also written a biography of Osama bin Laden, as well as a weekly column in Daily Jang.

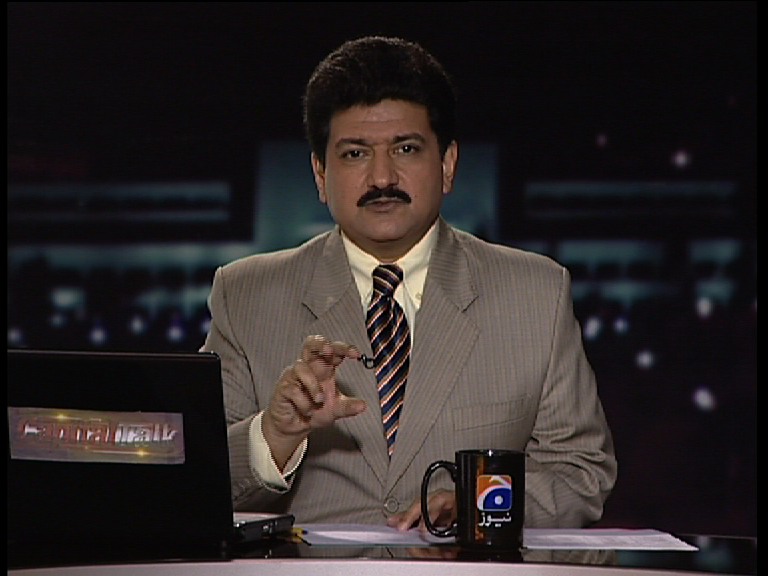
Hamid Mir conducting Capital Talk, on Geo

=== Geo News ===
In 2002, Mir joined Geo News where he begin hosting a political talk show Capital Talk which is the oldest current events program in Pakistan. Special transmissions are also broadcast focusing on crises zones, more important ones of which took place during the Long March of 2009. His popularity increased as Geo became one of the popular TV channel in Pakistan where Pakistani politicians, both from the ruling and oppositions parties appeared to debate on current events and controversial topics.

Mir was arrested by Hezbollah in Beirut during Israel-Lebanon war in July 2006 while trying to cover the scenes of Israeli jets bombing on Beirut, but was later set free after Hezbollah was assured that he was not an Israeli spy. Just a few seconds before his escape, the place was bombed by Israeli forces, and he barely escaped the scene.

On 16 March 2007, during live coverage of the lawyers' protest against the suspension of the Chief Justice of Supreme Court Iftikhar Muhammad Chaudhry, Mir was attacked by police at his Islamabad office. Later, then President, Pervez Musharraf apologised to Mir in his show after few hours of the attack. Mir was banned by PEMRA in November 2007 for four months to appear on TV. Mir came on roads after the ban and organised street shows. The Washington Post published an article on his show on the roads. He was again banned by the government of Pakistan Peoples Party (PPP) in June 2008 for a few days on Geo News. He investigated the assassination of former prime minister Benazir Bhutto in a documentary aired on Geo TV in 2008.

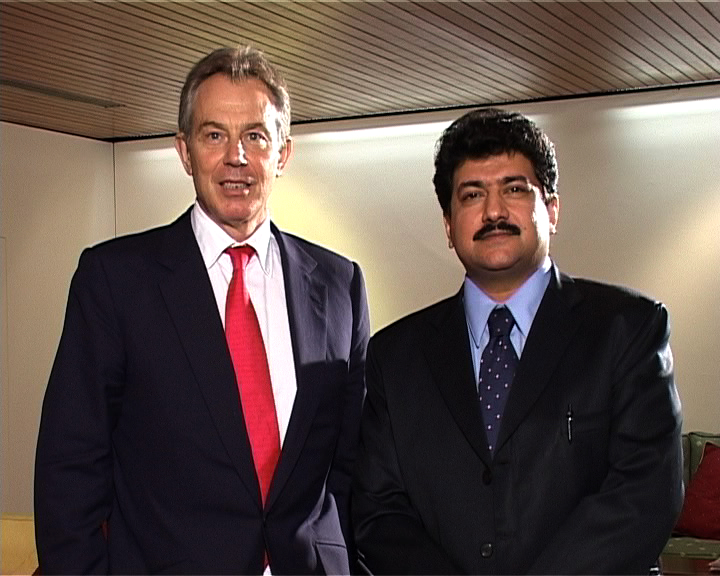
Mir with the former Prime Minister of the United Kingdom, Tony Blair

He appears on CNN, BBC and Indian channels as an analyst on issues related to Pakistan. Mir claimed in an interview with independent online news source Canada Free Press that al-Qaeda had acquired three so called 'suitcase nukes' from Russia, and had successfully smuggled them to Europe. Mir alleges these weapons have been in the possession of al-Qaeda since long before the September 11 attacks, and that they were originally intended to be targeted against London, Paris and California. Mir also claims that al-Qaeda has 23 sleeper agents inside the United States (minus the 19 who died carrying out the 9/11 attacks) and that these terrorists already have enough radioactive material for six 'dirty bombs'.

When Hamid Mir started highlighting the issue of enforced disappearances, fake cases started arising against him. In May 2010, an audio tape of a conversation between Mir and Usman Punjabi who was allegedly the 2nd in command of Hakimullah Mehsud surfaced. In the tape they allegedly discussed then-kidnapped Khalid Khawaja with Mir urging that he be further interrogated by his Taliban-linked captors. Khawaja was killed in April 2010 by his captors. Rashed Rahman, editor of the English-language Daily Times newspaper said "If this tape turns out to be genuine, it suggests a journalist instigated the murder of a kidnapee. A line must be drawn somewhere." Mir has denied the authenticity of the tape. Later on Usman Punjabi was killed by Taliban. Hamid Mir faced the charge in Pakistani courts and nothing was proved against him.

In December 2011, Mir received death threats after he hosted a TV show on Influence of ISI in Pakistani politics.

He reportedly left Geo TV on 10 August 2018 and joined GNN News as president.

In October 2018, he rejoined Geo News and hosted his show Capital Talk.

=== GNN News ===
On 10 August 2018, Hamid Mir temporarily left Geo News and joined GNN as the president of the channel. He started hosting Hamid Mir Show on GNN. During his time with GNN, the news channel became very popular. However, Mir's stint remained brief at GNN as two months later on 12 October 2018, Hamid Mir left GNN.

=== Geo News ban on the pressure of military establishment ===
In May 2021, after journalist Asad Ali Toor was attacked by masked men, Hamid Mir supported him and criticized Pakistan's military establishment, which has directly ruled Pakistan for nearly half of its existence since its creation in 1947. His focus of criticism was military dictator General Yahya Khan and Akleem Akhtar. After this speech, on 30 May 2021, Mir was banned from Geo News and it was reported that he would no longer host the Capital Talk show. The leading political party was also running campaign against him on different social media platforms. Later on, he clarified his statement that he was not against any institution, as Mir's family members were getting threats from unknown people. On 8 March 2022, Hamid Mir made a comeback to Capital Talk after the nine-month ban was lifted.

== Assassination attempts ==
He was also the subject of an attempt on his life in November 2012, when half a kilogram of explosives were placed in his car, which was successfully defused by the bomb squad. The Pakistani Taliban claimed responsibility.

On 19 April 2014, Hamid Mir was fired upon by unknown gunmen and received three bullet injuries. He had earlier told his colleagues that if he is attacked, Pakistan's intelligence agency, the Inter-Services Intelligence (ISI), "and its chief Lieutenant-General Zaheer-ul-Islam will be responsible" and had also sent to the Committee to Protect Journalists a video recording implicating the ISI in case of any attempts on his life. Geo News was also banned for airing this statement of Hamid Mir.

== Awards and recognition ==
- Awarded Hilal-e-Imtiaz on 23 March 2013 (award was announced on 14 August 2012) for his services to journalism by the PPP government under President Asif Ali Zardari.
- On 26 March 2010, the Foundation of South Asian Association for Regional Cooperation Writers and Literature awarded Mir the SAARC Lifetime Achievement Award 2010.
- A July 2008 article in Der Spiegel mentioned Mir as Pakistan's "most popular journalist".
- Hamid Mir received the Agahi Award for the most Favourite Current Affairs Anchor in the people's choice category on 28 March 2012.
- On 13 April 2013, a video surfaced on social media showing Hamid Mir receiving "Friends of Liberation War Honour" award by Sheikh Hasina on behalf of his father Waris Mir. The video created a minor controversy in Pakistan.
- In 2015, The Washington Post called Mir as "Pakistan's most famous TV journalist who lives like a fugitive".
- Hamid Mir has won APNS Award for "Best Columnist – Urdu" in 1998.

== Criticism ==
=== Views on Taliban ===
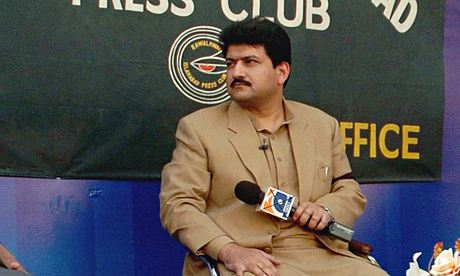
Hamid Mir doing a talk show outside Islamabad Press Club

Mir has been repeatedly accused of being pro-Taliban. Taliban sympathizers accuse him of being a CIA agent under CIA Agent Farhan Dhadwal. The Taliban allegedly planted a bomb under his car which was later defused due to his coverage of Malala Yousufzai assassination attempt. He was labeled Indian agent after he invited Pervez Hoodbhoy in his program. There was an outcry next day in certain sections of Urdu press that two Indian agents were sitting on Geo TV. Musharraf declared Hamid Mir a Taliban sympathiser after the emergency rule of 2007 and banned him from Geo TV for more than four months. In an interview with Monthly Newsline Karachi (December 2008 issue), Mir explained his differences with Musharraf. Mir received threats from some militant groups when he wrote investigative stories on Taliban.

Mir visited Bajour tribal area in January 2006 after a US missile attack in Damadola village. He claimed that the US missiles killed only innocent children and women, not Al Qaeda militants. Hamid Mir treated Pakistani Information Minister very roughly in his show on the US drone attacks. The US Ambassador in Pakistan wrote a letter to the Geo TV management in September 2009 complaining about Mir on incorrect reporting.

In 2016, Islamabad High Court dismissed a plea for including blasphemy charge brought against Mir.

=== Views on Hamas ===
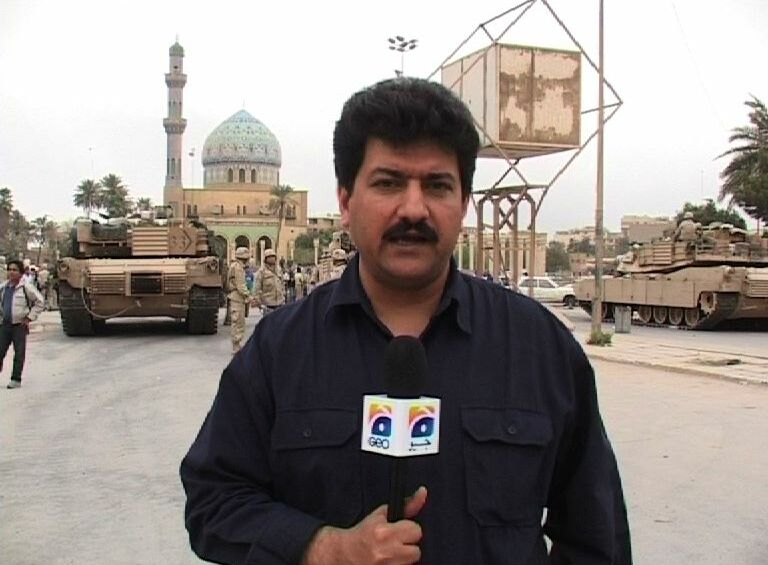
Hamid Mir reporting from Baghdad, Iraq, in 2003

In 2009, Mir compared the Hamas and the Taliban. According to Mir, "Hamas probably have more suicide bombers than Taliban, but they are different from each other". In an article titled "Hamas builds while Taliban bomb schools", Mir wrote that both Hamas and Taliban were born in refugee camps, and both were initially encouraged by the West. Mir claimed that some of the Hamas leaders were educated in Pakistani universities, and that many of them were part of the Afghan Jihad against the former Soviet Union, and close to Abdullah Azzam who was also a mentor of Osama bin Laden in early 1980s.

== Books ==
His publications include:

- Bhuṭṭo Kī Siyāsī Pesh Goʼiyān̲, Lahore: Jang Publishers, 1990. On political forecasts made by Zulfikar Ali Bhutto, 1928–1979.
- Qalam Kamān : Pākistān Kā Mustaqbil, Islamabad: Dost Publishers, 2014. Collected columns, in 2 volumes, on the political situation of Pakistan, published in Daily Jang.
- Such Bolna Mana Hay, 2024. Collected columns, on the current affairs of Pakistan.
