= Capital Talk =

Pakistani political talk show

- Genre: Political talk show
- Presented by: Hamid Mir
- Country of origin: Pakistan
- Original language: Urdu
- No. of episodes: 3700

Production
- Executive producer: Tafseer Hussain
- Producer: Jahangir Malik
- Production locations: Islamabad, Pakistan
- Running time: 36 minutes

Original release
- Network: Geo News
- Release: 2002 – present

Capital Talk is the flagship political talk show broadcast on Geo News. Hosted by Hamid Mir, Capital Talk looks at the challenges, issues and concerns facing Pakistan on a daily basis. The format includes several guests who participate in a dialogue on a topic related to current affairs. It is broadcast four days a week (Monday to Thursday) on Geo News.

== History ==
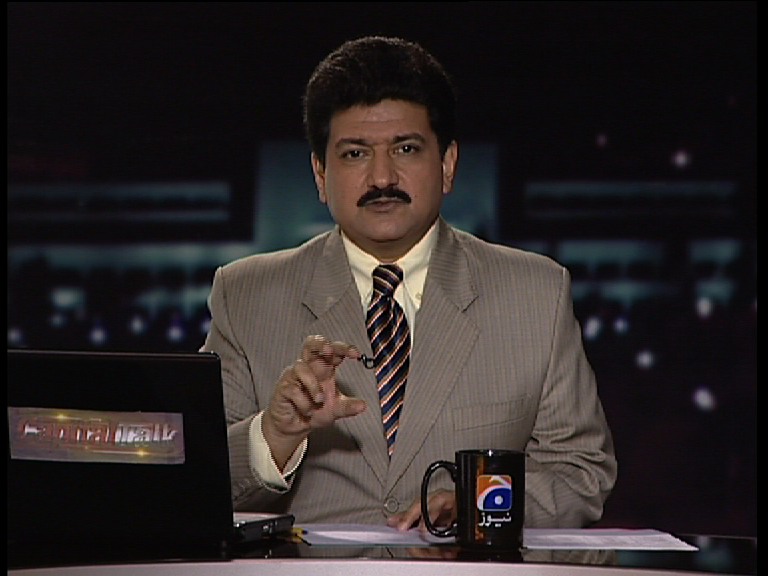
Hamid Mir at the Capital Talk studio

Launched in 2002, it is the oldest current events program in Pakistan. The first guest at the show was Ameen Faheem with whom the first host Hamid Mir discussed the 2002 Pakistan general election. Special transmissions are also broadcast focusing on crises zones, such as those which took place during the Long March of 2009.

In December 2007, the show was banned by Pervez Musharraf due to Mir's constant criticism of the Government. The show returned in January 2008 but was hosted by Muhammad Malik instead of Hamid Mir. After the General Election of 2008, Mir returned to Capital Talk.

In October 2012, Capital Talk completed its 10 years of running. This was celebrated by Geo News by running a special episode of the program.

Few of the famous political figures which have been interviewed include General Pervez Musharraf, Asif Ali Zardari, Nawaz Sharif, Jemima Khan, Imran Khan, Chaudhry Shujaat, Abdul Rashid Ghazi, Hillary Clinton and Condoleezza Rice. Aamir Liaquat Hussain, Shehbaz Sharif

=== Removal and return of Hamid Mir ===
In May 2021, after journalist Asad Ali Toor was attacked by masked men, Hamid Mir supported him and criticized Pakistan's military establishment of censoring the media and persecuting journalists. On 30 May 2021, Mir was banned from Geo News and it was reported that he would no longer host the Capital Talk show. On 8 March 2022, Hamid Mir returned to Capital Talk after the ban was lifted.

== See also ==
- Geo News
- Urdu News
