= Gopal Guru =

Indian political scientist

Gopal Guru is an Indian political scientist and former professor in political science at Centre for Political Studies, Jawaharlal Nehru University. He has been a visiting professor at Columbia University, the University of Oxford and the University of Pennsylvania. He previously taught at the University of Delhi and the University of Pune. He also served as the editor of the journal EPW from January 2018 to July 2023.

== Career ==
Gopal Guru is the author of numerous articles on Dalit discourse, women, politics and philosophy. His specialisation includes Indian Political Thought, Humiliation, Social Movements etc. He is considered to be one of the high ranking academics to open up caste debates in the study of liberal arts in India. He pioneered new dimensions in the re-thinking of Dalit discourse with the introduction of critical theory in understanding questions of constructions and fallout of Dalit identity in India. His work primarily brings ethics back into theorizing and philosophizing Dalit discourses which, for decades, were lost in the debates of representational politics. His academic works theorizes on the moral categories of self-respect, recognition, shame, dignity, humiliation and at the same time re-asserts a non-instrumentalist view of rationality in explaining matters of social justice. He was a member of the Government of India's nodal group (2007) tasked with framing the charter for a proposed Equal Opportunity Commission.

He delivered the first in a series of eight open lectures delivered on the Jawaharlal Nehru University campus (17–24 February 2016), after the campus was branded anti-national by sangh parivar forces. He said that, the nation cannot be defined in terms of borders alone, and contended that there has to be "radical rotation" in society, that the economic and social aspects of a nation should be considered together, and the economic should not get precedence over the social. He also argued that Gandhi took Ambedkar much more seriously than other thinkers and leaders, who were their contemporary like Rabindranath Tagore.

== Awards ==
- He received Malcolm Adiseshiah Award for Distinguished Contribution to Development Studies for 2013–14.

== Important works ==
Gopal Guru has authored more than 120 articles and book chapters in various international journals and publishers. He also frequently writes in Indian Magazines and News Papers.

=== Books ===
- Gopal Guru (ed). Humiliation: Claims and Context, Oxford University Press (2009), New Delhi.
- Gopal Guru & Sunder Sarukkai. The Cracked Mirror, Oxford University Press (2017), New Delhi.
- Gopal Guru (ed). Atrophy in Dalit Politics, Vikas Adhyayan Kendra (2005), Mumbai.
- Gopal Guru & Sunder Sarukkai. Experience, Caste, and the Everyday Social, Oxford University Press (2020), New Delhi.

=== Book Chapter ===
- ‘Dalits in Pursuit of Modernity’, in Romila Thapar (Ed.), India another Millennium, New Delhi, Penguin-Viking (2000), New Delhi.
- ‘Constitutional Justice: Positional and Cultural’, in ed., Rajeev Bhargava, Politics and Philosophy of Indian Constitution, Oxford University Press (2008), New Delhi.
- ‘20th Century Discourse on Social Justice: a view from Bahishkrut Baharat’, in ed., Sabhyasachi Bhattacharya, History, Political thought in Modern India and Social Science, Oxford University Press (2007), New Delhi.

=== Journal articles ===
- "How Egalitarian are the Social Sciences in India?," Economic & Political Weekly, vol.37, No.5 (2002): 5003–09.
- ‘Appropriating Ambedkar‘, Economic and Political Weekly, Vol. 26, No.27/28 (1991): 1697–1699.
- "Archaeology of Untouchability", Economic & Political Weekly, Vol. 44, No. 37(2009): 49–56.
- "The Idea of India: Derivative, Desi and Beyond," Economic and Political Weekly, Vol. 46, No. 37 (2011): 36–42.
- Migration: A Moral Protest, Social Change (SAGE), 24 June 2019.
- The Language of Social Sciences in India, Review of Development and Change (SAGE), 19 July 2019.
