= The Establishment (Pakistan) =

Deep-state dominance of the military in Pakistan

The Establishment (Urdu: اسٹیبلشمنٹ), also referred to as the military establishment, or deep state, is a term commonly used in Pakistan to describe the influence of the Pakistan Armed Forces, intelligence agencies, and associated pro-military entities within the country's governance structure.

Since Pakistan's independence in 1947, the Establishment has periodically assumed direct control of the government through military coups and has frequently played a substantial role in influencing political and security policies during civilian administrations. It is widely regarded as an influential force in Pakistan's political and strategic affairs, particularly in areas concerning domestic policies, national security and foreign relations. This includes state policies introduced during various periods of military rule, including the Islamization measures implemented under General Zia-ul-Haq.

In the 2000s, the military establishment later reversed its support of political Islam under General Pervez Musharraf, who pursued enlightened moderation, leading Pakistan to join the United States-led war on terror and subsequently becoming designated as a major non-NATO ally by the Bush administration. Furthermore, in the 2010s, General Raheel Sharif pursued a policy of hardline crackdowns on Islamist militant groups, continuing this reversal of Zia-ul-Haq's aggressive pro-Islamist policies. Civilian members of the military-dominated Establishment have included: Sharifuddin Pirzada, Tariq Azim Khan, Sahabzada Yaqub Khan A. K. Brohi, Ghulam Ishaq Khan and Zafar Ahmed Ansari.

== Reinforcement of deep-state dominance ==
The Establishment is notable for its covert interventions and organisation of military coups against the civilian government, and was reportedly behind the 1953–54 Constitutional Coup in the Dominion of Pakistan. It also organised the coups of 1958, 1977, and 1999. The Pakistan Army has been involved in enforcing martial law against civilian governments under the claim of restoring law and order in the country as is its role in the Constitution of Pakistan. It has dismissed the legislative branch and parliament a total of four times since Pakistan's independence, and maintains wider commercial, foreign, and political interests in the country. Due to this imbalance of power, the Pakistani military has faced allegations of acting as a state within a state.

== Characteristics and composition ==
Ayesha Siddiqa, a Pakistani journalist and scholar, notes that the Establishment is overwhelmingly dominated by the Pakistan Armed Forces (i.e. serving and retired officers, SPDF personnel, military-sponsored think-tanks etc.), with its core members also including civil bureaucrats, politicians, media houses and major economic players. Abubakar Siddique, a Bangladeshi writer, observed that the civilians involved with the Establishment, such as politicians and judges, are also very "pro-military". American political scientist Stephen P. Cohen says in his book, The Idea of Pakistan: "Of all of Ayub Khan's achievements, the most enduring was an informal political system that tied together the senior ranks of the military, the civil service, key members of the judiciary, and other elites. Subsequently dubbed the "Establishment," it resembles a classic oligarchy. Pakistani politician, Mushahid Hussain, revealed that members of the Establishment included members of the business community; journalists, editors, and media experts; and a few academics and members of think tanks. At times, some foreign ambassadors with particularly close ties to the leadership were de facto members [...] Military officers and civilian bureaucrats above a certain level were potential members. As Hussain notes, the informality of the Establishment ensures that occupying a particular post does not confer membership.

Over time, the civil–military power equation has undergone changes, such as increased power sharing between the civilian government and the military as well as the convergence of interests in major aspects such as the China–Pakistan Economic Corridor. During the tenure of General Ayub Khan, the Establishment's code and tenants included the following (as outlined in Cohen's book): India was the main, existential threat to Pakistan, and accordingly the Pakistani military was a priority in all affairs of the state. Since Pakistan could not take on India alone, military alliances were important and essential to the state's survival. Likewise, natural allies included other moderate Islamic states, which were seen as role models. Domestically, the military was a role model for the Pakistani people. Kashmir, a Muslim-majority region that served as the core territorial conflict hotspot between India and Pakistan, was always an issue for the Establishment, to the extent that it became an integral reason for the existence of Pakistan. Quick reforms and revolutions were considered problematic.

Foreign aid from the United States, Japan, and then the People's Republic of China (after 1963) was a driver of the economy. The Establishment ensured control over information dissemination through the media and academia. Radical and/or violent Islamic groups were slowly tolerated. The Establishment theoretically tolerated democratic rule and never seriously imposed Islam; the army being less tolerant of Islamists. Just by surviving, Pakistan and its Establishment would be defeating India.

Zulfikar Ali Bhutto, a founding member of the Establishment, started looking for a new identity for Pakistan, chiefly one that it did not share with neighbouring rival India. Accordingly, Pakistan started to look towards the Middle East for "aid, ideology, and strategic cooperation"; while at the same time turning its back away from its own shared history with India in South Asia. Further building on Ayub Khan-era policies, Kashmir remained important for the Establishment for a variety of reasons; most notably due to its strategic importance to Pakistan. Furthermore, it was seen as a chance for Pakistan to fulfil its vision of its founding, the two-nation theory—that of being a "homeland for oppressed Indian Muslims". Outside of the Kashmir conflict, India as a nation was perceived as an existential threat to Pakistan in every way, particularly after the 1971 secession of Muslim-majority Bangladesh (formerly East Pakistan), and the latter's belief that India did not pose an existential threat, effectively endangering the two-nation theory.

On 1 April 2022, Prime Minister Imran Khan announced that in context of no-confidence motion against him in the National Assembly, the "establishment" had given him three options to choose from viz: "resignation, no-confidence [vote] or elections".

== Criticism ==
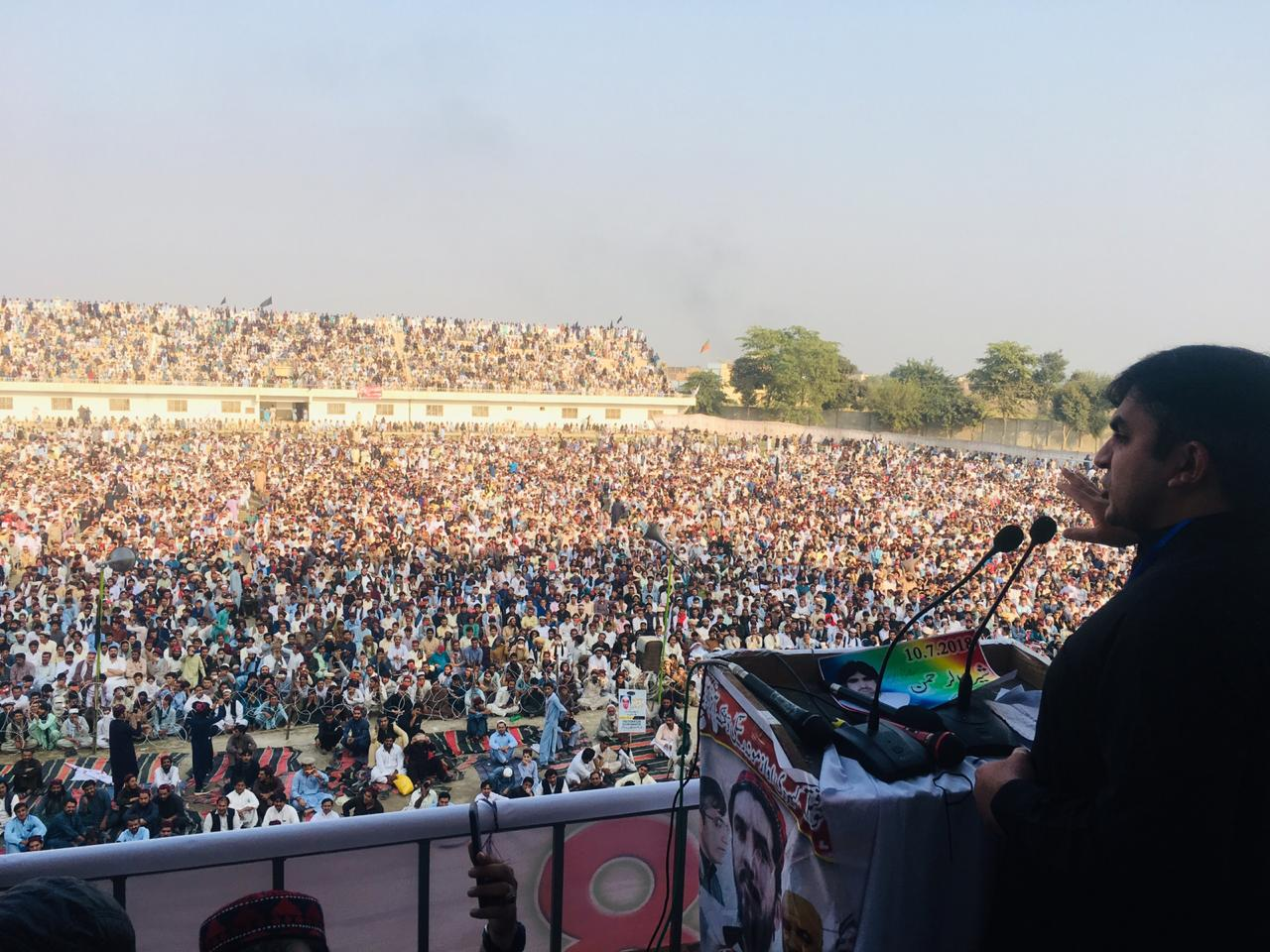
Anti-establishment powershow in Bannu attended by thousands of people

In Pakistan, there have been several protests against the Establishment but these are not covered by the Pakistani media channels since they are not allowed by the Establishment. The Pashtun Tahafuz Movement (PTM), for instance, openly criticises the Pakistan Army and accuses the Pakistani state of violating the basic human rights of Pashtuns.

In Pakistan, especially in Balochistan and Khyber Pakhtunkhwa, there is a famous slogan "ye jo dehshatgardi hai, iske peeche wardi hai", Urdu: یہ جو دہشت گردی ہے، اس کے پیچھے وردی ہے ('those in uniform are behind terrorism'). Due to the popularity of the slogan PTM adopted it. The PTM led by Manzoor Ahmad Pashteen has significantly raised awareness among Pakistan's Pashtun community about the military establishment's actions. Originating from South Waziristan, Pashteen's leadership sparked widespread peaceful protests, highlighting extrajudicial killings, enforced disappearances, and landmine hazards in tribal areas. His distinctive red-and-black cap and compelling speeches symbolized resistance, exposing the civilian toll of military operations like Operation Zarb-e-Azb. Despite media blackouts and state repression, PTM's social media activism amplified Pashtun grievances, challenging the military's unchecked authority and advocating for justice and constitutional rights.

In September 2020, the Pakistan Democratic Movement was formed with the main objective to remove the Establishment's association with the politics of Pakistan. In 2023 when Imran Khan was arrested after his removal from government in April 2022 and the subsequent political crisis in the country, there were large-scale protests against the Establishment's strongholds by Khan's party, Pakistan Tehreek-e-Insaf which led to a crackdown against it.

Apart from political movements, many journalists have also taken voice against the Establishment. Hamid Mir, Pakistan's most well-known journalist, spoke against the Establishment many times. Assassination attempts have been made on many journalists who spoke against the Establishment including Mir, Asad Ali Toor, and others. Prominent journalist Matiullah Jan was also abducted and Jan accused the Establishment of abducting him. Journalist Imran Riaz Khan, with over 5.6 million YouTube subscribers, was abducted on 11 May 2023, allegedly for criticizing the government and military. Released in September 2023 after alleged torture, he was rearrested in February 2024 for corruption. Initially a PTI and military supporter, Khan mocked Pashtun and Baloch missing persons, calling them "traitors" who "deserved to disappear". After his own disappearance, he apologized, expressing solidarity with Baloch families.

== See also ==
- Criticism of Pakistan Armed Forces
- Military dictatorship in Pakistan
- Separatist movements of Pakistan
- Terrorism in Pakistan
- The Establishment#Pakistan
- Deep state
