= Boof =

Boof may refer to:

== People ==
- Kola Boof, Sudanese-American novelist
- Boof Bonser (John Bonser; born 1981), American retired Major League Baseball pitcher nicknamed "Boof"
- Darren Lehmann (born 1970), Australian former cricketer nicknamed "Boof"
- Kelly Lindsey (born 1979), American soccer coach and former player nicknamed "Boof"
- Ryan Battaglia (born 1992), Australian baseball player nicknamed "Boof"

== Arts and entertainment ==
- Boof, a comic book series from Image Comics
- Gary "Boof" Head, fictional character on the Australian soap opera Neighbours
- Lisa "Boof" Marconi, character in the movie Teen Wolf

== Other uses ==
- Boofing or the boof stroke, a maneuver in whitewater kayaking
- Boofing, a slang term for an alcohol enema
- Boofing, a generalized slang term for the rectal administration of a drug
- Boof, a slang term for something of low quality, commonly used in the Dark and Darker community to describe a player wearing very little or no gear
