= Al-Musharifah =

Al-Musharifah (Arabic: المشرفة) is a neighbourhood in Jeddah, Saudi Arabia.

In the late 1960s Al-Musharifah was one of the newest residential areas in the city. At that period of time, patches of open desert wasteland were located between the houses of Al-Musharifah; local children played games on those parcels of desert. At the time of the neighbourhood's opening, the roads were not paved.

== Notable residents ==
Osama bin Laden and his family moved to Al-Musharifah several years after bin Laden first enrolled at the Al-Thager Model School.

== Sources ==
- Coll, Steve. The Bin Ladens: An Arabian Family in the American Century. New York City: The Penguin Press, 2008.
