= Interviews of Osama bin Laden =

Conversations with journalists (1993–2001)

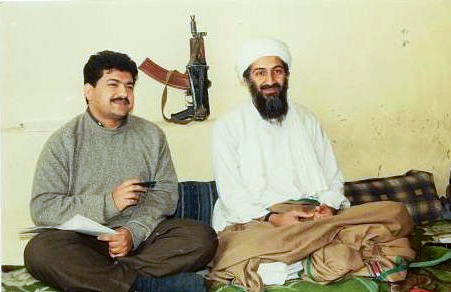
Hamid Mir interviewing al-Qaeda leader Osama bin Laden in 1997.

Since the early 1990s, several interviews of Osama bin Laden have appeared in the global media. Among these was an interview by Middle East specialist Robert Fisk. In the interviews, Bin Laden acknowledges having instigated bombings in Khobar, Saudi Arabia, in 1996 and Riyadh, Saudi Arabia, in 2003, but denies involvement with both the 1993 and 2001 attacks on the WTC towers in New York City.

Bin Laden himself mentioned some of the interviews directly in a 2004 video, saying "you can read this, if you wish, in my interview with Scott [Macleod] in Time Magazine in 1996, or with Peter Arnett on CNN in 1997, or my meeting with John Miller in 1998."

== The Independent: 1993, 1996 and 1997 ==
Robert Fisk interviewed Osama bin Laden on three occasions, reporting the interviews in articles published by The Independent on 6 December 1993, 10 July 1996, and 22 March 1997.

bin Laden gave his first interview to the Independent newspaper's Robert Fisk in 1993. This was the first he had ever given to a Western journalist. It was titled "Anti-Soviet warrior puts his army on the road to peace," and related to bin Laden and his recruited mujahideen's road building in Sudan overseeing construction and agricultural projects. Also during Fisk's first interview in 1993, he wrote of Osama bin Laden: "With his high cheekbones, narrow eyes and long brown robe, Mr Bin Laden looks every inch the mountain warrior of mujahedin legend. Chadored children danced in front of him, preachers acknowledged his wisdom" while noting that he was accused of "training for further jihad wars". When asked about United States support for the Arab mujahideen during the Soviet-Afghan war, bin Laden responded "Personally neither I nor my brothers saw evidence of American help."

Fisk interviewed bin Laden again in 1996, bin Laden had just been exiled from Sudan and was back in Afghanistan. The interview was conducted 10 days after a bombing in al-Khobar, Saudi Arabia killed 19 U.S. soldiers, and though responsibility for that attack has been attributed to both al-Qaeda and Iran, bin Laden told Fisk that, “This doesn’t mean declaring war against the West and Western people but against the American regime which is against every American…The explosion in al-Khobar did not come as a direct reaction to the American occupation, but as a result of American behavior against Muslims, its support of Jews in Palestine, and of the massacres of Muslims in Palestine and Lebanon…”.

During one of Fisk's interviews with bin Laden, Fisk noted an attempt by bin Laden to convert him. bin Laden said; "Mr Robert, one of our brothers had a dream...that you were a spiritual person ... this means you are a true Muslim". Fisk replied; "Sheikh Osama, I am not a Muslim. ... I am a journalist [whose] task is to tell the truth". bin Laden replied: "If you tell the truth, that means you are a good Muslim".

Fisk again interviewed bin Laden on March 22, 1997; bin Laden said of his operations at the time "We are still at the beginning of our military action against the American forces." Also during the final interview in 1997, bin Laden said he sought God's help "to turn America into a shadow of itself".

== Time: 1996 ==
In 1996, Scott MacLeod of Time interviewed bin Laden in Khartoum, Sudan at a building on the outskirts of the city.

== Abdel Bari Atwan: 1996 ==
In 1996, Abdel Bari Atwan, the editor-in-chief of the London-based pan-Arab newspaper Al Quds Al Arabi interviewed bin Laden. He had to travel through the mountains, dressed in Afghan clothing. He later called the experience his "most frightening trip". His impression of bin Laden was that he is "a phenomenon, extreme". Atwan stayed in the caves for two days, sleeping in primitive conditions in sub-zero temperatures.

== CNN: 1997 ==
Peter Arnett of CNN interviewed bin Laden in March 1997 after bin Laden declared jihad on the United States. Asked by Arnett, "What are your future plans?", bin Laden said, "You'll see them and hear about them in the media, God willing".

CNN producer Peter Bergen who produced bin Laden's interview with Arnett, was also present during this interview, and it became the first television interview, in which bin Laden declared war against the United States for the first time to a Western audience.

== Hamid Mir: 1997, 1998 and 2001 ==
Hamid Mir was the first Pakistani journalist to interview Osama bin Laden. He first interviewed bin Laden for the Daily Pakistan in March 1997, in a cave of Tora Bora mountains in eastern Afghanistan. Before his interview, Mir was body searched by bin Laden's security, after which bin Laden read from a file which contained Mir's bank account number and the names of his family members. In the interview bin Laden spoke out against U.S. troops being stationed in Saudi Arabia and denounced Saddam Hussein, calling him a "socialist motherfucker." He also claimed, “If Afghanistan, Pakistan, Iran and China get united, the United States and India will become ineffective.”

Mir interviewed bin Laden for the second time for Ausaf in May 1998, in a hideout near the Kandahar International Airport. He interviewed Bin Laden for the third time for Dawn and Ausaf on 8 November 2001, at an undisclosed location near Kabul. During the interview, bin Laden claimed to have both chemical and nuclear weapons and threatened to use them in response to America using nuclear weapons against him. When Mir asked where he obtained these weapons, bin Laden replied "Go to the next question." bin Laden also stated that the claims that he had undergone surgery for issues with his kidneys were false and also laughed off claims that he was married to one of Mullah Omar's daughters.

== ABC: 1998 ==
A recorded interview in May 1998, a little over two months before the U.S. embassy bombings in Kenya and Tanzania, shows bin Laden answering questions posed by some of his followers at a mountaintop camp in southern Afghanistan. In the latter part of the interview, ABC reporter John Miller asks further questions.

== Time: 1999 ==
Rahimullah Yusufzai, a journalist for Pakistan's The News International, TIME, and ABC News, in 1999 secured a four-hour interview with bin Laden in Afghanistan's Helmand province. During Yusufzai's late-night conversation, bin Laden appeared to be in good health, though he admitted to a sore throat and a bad back. He continually sipped water from a cup, and Yusufzai caught him on videotape walking with the aid of a stick. This latter footage was erased by bin Laden's bodyguards. The interview appeared in the 11 January 1999 issue of Time Asia.

== MBC: 2001 ==
Bakr Atyani, a correspondent for MBC, met with bin Laden in Kandahar in June 2001. bin Laden had refused to speak on camera because he had promised the Taliban that he would not give any media statements, but Atyani spoke with al-Qaeda military chief Abu Hafs off camera. Hafs had told Atyani that "In the next few weeks we will carry out a big surprise and we will strike American and Israeli interest" and that "the coffin business will increase in the United States." When Atyani asked bin Laden for confirmation of this, he smiled and nodded in agreement. After Atyani ran his story, he was contacted by Pamela Constable of The Washington Post, who asked if he really believed that al-Qaeda was planning a major attack, to which Atyani replied that he did believe them and that "it sounds serious."

== Ummat: 2001 ==
The Daily Ummat interviewed Osama bin Laden on September 28, 2001, weeks after the September 11 attacks on the United States. In the interview bin Laden denies his involvement in the attacks; the interview was relayed in English by the BBC monitoring service.

== Al Jazeera: 2001 ==
Tayseer Allouni of Al Jazeera conducted an interview with bin Laden on October 21, 2001. However, the network did not broadcast the interview. Three months later, CNN broadcast the interview without the permission of Al Jazeera. During the interview, Allouni had asked bin Laden for his response to the claim that he was behind the attacks on September 11. bin Laden described the hijackers as "brave guys who took the battle to the heart of America" and said that "[t]hey did this, as we understand it, and this is something we have agitated for before, as a matter of self-defense...If inciting people to do that is terrorism, and if killing those who kill our sons is terrorism, then let history be witness that we are terrorists." He also described the U.S. invasion of Afghanistan as a war between Muslims and a "global crusade".

== See also ==
- Motivations of the September 11 attacks
