= The Idea of Pakistan =

2004 book by Stephen P. Cohen

- Author: Stephen P. Cohen
- Language: English
- Publication date: 2004
- Publication place: United States
- ISBN: 978-0815715023
- Preceded by: India: Emerging Power
- Followed by: The Future of Pakistan

The Idea of Pakistan is a book written by the American political scientist Stephen P. Cohen. First published in 2004, the book attempts to answer the question of "What is Pakistan?" and goes beyond the simplistic labels given to this south-Asian nation; by unravelling Pakistan's past, Cohen wants to predict the nation's future and how the idea of Pakistan will work.

== Background and content ==
The book is a followup to India: Emerging Power and prepares the way for The Future of Pakistan, written in 2012, which was drawn from the concluding chapter of The Idea of Pakistan.

"Pakistan now negotiates with its allies and friends by pointing a gun to its own head"

— The Idea of Pakistan, pg 270

In the book Steve Cohen discusses the "idea of Pakistan, the state of Pakistan, regionalism and separation, demographic, educational and economic prospects, Pakistan's future and American options" among other things. Towards the end, Cohen outlines five futures for Pakistan (implicitly saying that the future will consist of a mix of each rather than any single one). These scenarios are: "the emergence of a moderate, democratic state; the rise of authoritarianism; the rise of an Islamist state; Pakistan’s possible breakup and Pakistan after a major war with India".

Cohen notes how the vision of Pakistan as a state for the Muslims of South Asia was torn apart with the creation of Bangladesh in 1971. Ahmad Faruqui notes how Cohen acknowledges that "the relentless pursuit of Kashmir has done more damage to Pakistan than any other single issue". He says that the vision of a democratic state "is doubtful whether the Pakistani military with its oversized political agenda will ever let this vision come to pass," adding that "the Pakistani army is long on memory and short on foresight". Ahmad Faruqui notes how the "book’s implicit hypothesis is that Pakistan's insecurities have led to military rule". Cohen also blames the politicians for being unable to make a state that fulfills basic obligations to its citizens.

== Reviews and reactions ==
India Today writes that the book "is a detailed biography of a state let down by men as well as history, with every act of salvation ending as betrayal...".

Rizwan Web of the Institute of Peace and Conflict Studies writes that Cohen says that Pakistan is run by the "Establishment" comprising various elites; a group which

believes that India has to be countered, nuclear weapons have secured Pakistan, Kashmir is the unfinished part of the partition plan, and large-scale social reforms are unacceptable, vocal Muslim nationalism is desirable but Islamism is not; Washington should not be trusted but should be taken maximum advantage of.

The book also provides a view of how Washington can advance its interests in South Asia.

Qadar Bakhsh Baloch of Qurtuba University writes, "The basic theme of the book is that the Idea of Pakistan has fallen short of its ideas and the biggest question today is how the idea of Pakistan will work". However Baloch writes: "Cohen's facts are questionable, his logic manipulative, and his omissions are deliberate and meaningful".

In Outlook magazine, Indian politician Jaswant Singh cites Cohen, who says that "this 'Indian dimension of Pakistan's identity' [was]...systematically overlooked by contemporary Pakistani politicians and scholars"; this, according to Singh, "creates a cruel dilemma—for it can neither be rejected nor acknowledged by Pakistan. How to reject the reality of one geography, or pervert totally a common historical past?"

== See also ==
- The Idea of India
- Military Inc.
