= Sunil Khilnani =

Indian political scientist

Sunil Khilnani is a professor of politics and history at Ashoka University, India. Previously, he was a professor of politics and the Director of the King's College London India Institute. He is a scholar of Indian history and politics best known as the author of The Idea of India (1997). He was the presenter of a BBC Radio 4 series entitled Incarnations: India in 50 Lives, which was later published as a book in 2016. He was a 2010 Berlin Prize Fellow, and he was also a recipient of the Indian government's 2005 Pravasi Bharatiya Samman award.

== Career ==
Khilnani was born in New Delhi and grew up on the continents of Africa, Europe and Asia. He earned a first at Trinity Hall, Cambridge, and a PhD at King's College, Cambridge.

He was Starr Foundation Professor at the Johns Hopkins University's School of Advanced International Studies, and Director of South Asia Studies. He has also served on the Humanities and Social Sciences juries for the Infosys Prize from 2013 to 2015. As of 2023, Khilnani is a Professor of Political Science and History at Ashoka University. He is also the Dean of AshokaX, an initiative by the university that allows those not affiliated with Ashoka to take courses specially tailored for them.

== Personal life ==
He was born in 1960 in New Delhi. He is married to the writer Katherine Boo.

== Works ==
=== Books ===
- Arguing Revolution: the intellectual left in postwar France. New Haven: Yale University Press. 1993. ISBN 9780300057454.
- The Idea of India. London: Hamish Hamilton. 1997. ISBN 978-0241135730.
- Civil Society: History and Possibilities. Cambridge: Cambridge University Press. 2001. (co-edited with Sudipta Kaviraj). ISBN 978-0-521-63344-4.
- Incarnations: India in 50 Lives. London: Allen Lane. 2016. ISBN 9780241208229.

=== Chapters in books ===
- "Democracy and its Indian pasts", in Kanbur, Ravi; Basu, Kaushik, eds., Arguments for a better world: essays in honor of Amartya Sen | Volume II: Society, institutions and development, Oxford and New York: Oxford University Press, pp. 488–502, ISBN 978-0-19-923997-9.
