= Amir Mir =

Pakistani journalist

- Born: Lahore, Punjab, Pakistan
- Education: Masters in Political Science
- Alma mater: University of Punjab
- Occupations: Journalist; writer
- Years active: 1988–present
- Parents: Waris Mir (father); Mumtaz Mir (mother)
- Relatives: Hamid Mir (brother); Huma Mir (sister)

Amir Mir is a Pakistani journalist, author, and business executive. He was the caretaker information minister of Punjab in 2023 to 2024.

Mir is currently the Chief Executive Officer (CEO) of the Googlynews.TV. Mir was the CEO of GNN after serving there as Chief Operational Officer as well as a founding member since the channel's inception in August 2018. Prior to this, he worked as COO with JAAG TV, as a group editor of Daily Dunya and deputy editor/editor investigations for the English-language Pakistani daily The News International, based in Lahore. Mir founded and was editor of Weekly Independent, a political weekly magazine.

== Early life and family ==
Amir Mir was born to Waris Mir. He studied at the Government College University. He is a brother of Hamid Mir and Huma Mir.

== Career ==
In 1988, Mir started his career with English daily The Frontier Post in Lahore. In 1993 he became a part of Pakistan's English-language daily The News International and worked as a team member of the News Bureau of Investigation.

Mir has written for various publications such as the Inter Press Service, the Straits Times, the Gulf News and weekly The Friday Times and Monthly Newsline. Before rejoining The News in 2008, Mir had been working for the DAWN as deputy editor for the group's well reputed monthly magazine Herald.

In 2020, Mir was detained by the Federal Investigation Agency.

== Bibliography ==
- Most Wanted: Profiles of Terror (2002)
- The True Face of Jehadis (2006)
- The Fluttering Flag of Jehad (2008)
- Talibanization of Pakistan: From 9/11 to 26/11 (2009)
- The Bhutto Murder Trail: From Waziristan to GHQ (2010)

== Controversies ==
Mir has been an outspoken critic of former Pakistani President, Gen. Pervez Musharraf, condemning him as a military dictator who violated Pakistan's democracy and constitution. When he was named Best Reporter of 2005 by the All Pakistan Newspapers Society (APNS), he refused to accept the award as it was to be presented by Musharraf, and criticised the APNS for inviting Musharraf, whom Mir called a military dictator who did not respect the freedom of expression.

In his book, The True Face of Jehadis: Inside Pakistan's Network of Terror, Mir claimed Musharraf believes in Islamic fundamentalism. Mir accused Musharraf of making half-hearted efforts to curb radical Islamic groups operating in Pakistan.

Mir has been criticised within Pakistan for writing articles that are claimed to be damaging to Pakistan's standing in the world. Maj. Gen. Rashid Qureshi of the Pakistani army accused Mir of being an "Indian agent" after he published an article in Outlook, an Indian news magazine. Mir claimed harassment from officials in the Pakistani government and has reportedly told friends and family that president Pervez Musharraf was to be held responsible for any harm to his life or person. In a report highlighting threats to press freedom in Pakistan, Human Rights Watch claimed that Mir had been threatened by Musharraf, and claimed that Mir's car was set on fire in November 2003 as an act of intimidation and harassment.

Mir has been critical of US Predator drone attacks in Pakistan, stating that large numbers of civilians have been killed. On 10 April 2009, Mir told the Pakistan newspaper The News International that 687 civilians and only 14 high-value Al Qaeda targets were killed so far in the strikes.

On 1 February 2010, Mir reported that 123 civilians and 3 Al Qaeda fighters were killed in 10 drone strikes in January 2010. The Jamestown Foundation criticised Mir's numbers, stating that there had been 16.5 suspected militants killed for every civilian as of June 2010, according to the foundation's analysis of Western and Pakistani news sources.

The Long War Journal, through reports from various media outlets and US intelligence officials, estimated in July 2011 that the drone strikes in Pakistan had killed 2,018 militants and only 138 civilians since 2006.
