= Huma Mir =

Pakistani actress

- Born: Huma Waris Mir; 14 November 1970 (age 55); Karachi, Sindh, Pakistan
- Education: University of Karachi
- Occupations: Actress; Singer; Writer; Host; Newscaster
- Years active: 1980–present
- Children: 2
- Parents: Mumtaz Mir (mother); Waris Mir (father)
- Relatives: Hamid Mir (brother); Amir Mir (brother)

Huma Mir is a Pakistani actress, singer and writer. She is known for her roles in dramas Rafta Rafta, Gurez, Ba Adab Ba Mulahiza Hoshiyaar, Haala, Barish Ke Baad and Koyal.

== Early life and education ==
Huma's grandfather, Mir Abdul Aziz hailed from Sialkot, and was a poet in Punjabi, Urdu and Persian. Huma's father Waris Mir, was also a columnist for Daily Jang and her mother was Mumtaz Mir, who migrated to Pakistan from Jammu in the Jammu and Kashmir region in 1947. Huma's father died on 9 July 1987 in Lahore and her mother died in 1993.

Huma completed her studies from University of Karachi and she medical graduated with a First Class First Masters in Urdu Literature and she became a PhD candidate later she studied Advanced Communications and she got a Diploma in Advanced Communications.

== Career ==
Huma started working as a child actress and appeared in the drama Bahadar Ali which aired on PTV. She later worked in other dramas, such as Muntazir Rahain Manoos Ajnabi, Musafatein, Nice To Meet You Problem House, Padaash, Pas-E-Aaina and Palay Shah.

Huma Mir also writes articles for newspapers and magazines including Daily Times, The News International and The Nation in Pakistan and also at Canada. She is also Chairperson Youth of Committee at Arts Council of Pakistan at Karachi. She also sanged songs O Laal Meri Pat Rakhio which was original sanged by Noor Jehan also Sanu Nehar Wale Pul Te Bula Ke, Ho Jamalo and Jeevay Jeevay Pakistan.

Later she appeared in dramas Jise Paya Chahey Khwabon Ka Musafir, Aik Rat Aik Kahani, Jedi in Trouble, Afsos Hasil Ka and Musafatein. Then she took a break and then after a 12-year gap she appeared in drama Koyal it aired on Aaj Entertainment the drama was written by Zanjabeel Asim Shah and directed by Yasir Hussain in which she portrayed the role of Nargis.

== Personal life ==
Huma was married but later she filed for divorce citing irreconcilable differences and her older brothers Hamid Mir, Faisal Mir, Imran Mir and Amir Mir are journalists and newscasters.

== Filmography ==
=== Television ===
Year	Title	Role	Network
1980	Bahadar Ali	Nikhil	PTV
1986	Show Time	Herself	PTV
1987	Dhoop Kinare	Sharmeen	PTV
1989	Sitamgar Taray Liay	Rakhshanda	PTV
1990	Ba Adab Ba Mulahiza Hoshiyaar	Farhana	PTV
1991	Gurez	Rani	PTV
1992	Dastaan	Seemi	PTV
1992	Kaffara	Ghazala	PTV
1992	Hasina-E-Alam	Air Hostess	PTV
1992	Pas-e-Aaina	Batool	PTV
1993	Barish Ke Baad	Maheen	PTV
1993	Shehrzad	Sitara	PTV
1993	Zarb Taqseem	Najma	PTV
1993	Rozan-e-Zindan Se	Irfana	PTV
1994	Haala	Haala	PTV
1994	Khilonay	Doctor	PTV
1994	Rafta Rafta	Ruby	PTV
1995	Jise Paya Chahey Khwabon Ka Musafir	Mona	PTV
1995	Aik Rat Aik Kahani	Maya	PTV
1995	Uncle Sargam Show	Herself	PTV
1995	Khawab Azab	Suraiyya	PTV
1995	Palay Khan	Shazia	PTV
1995	Paadash	Rabia	PTV
1995	Monsoon	Kulsoom	PTV
1996	Jedi in Trouble	Jeni	PTV
1997	Afsos Hasil Ka	Shaista	PTV
1997	Musafatein	Zeba	PTV
1997	Jeet	Urooj	PTV
1998	Gardbad	Nashkah	PTV
1998	Haft Aasman	Reshma	PTV
1999	Ek Safar Tanha Hi	Nida	PTV
1999	Hanste Baste	Ghazal	PTV
1999	Sitamgar Tere Liay	Rakshanda	PTV
2000	Manoos Ajnabi	Tina	PTV
2021	Koyal	Nargis	Aaj Entertainment
2026	Mere Pass Raho Tum	Safia	Express Entertainment

=== Telefilm ===
Year	Title	Role
1993	Ain Ishq	Chamki
1994	Aadmi	Irfana
1995	Gul Phenke Hain	Doctor Samina

== Bibliography ==
Huma authored a critically acclaimed novel titled "Kuchh Aur" about the destruction of the city she loved, floods and society in disarray. She then wrote the biography of Talat Hussain titled "Yeh Hain Talat Hussain", in which she wrote about his acting career and his biography.
