= Behind the Beautiful Forevers =

2012 non-fiction book by Katherine Boo

- Author: Katherine Boo
- Language: English
- Subject: Poverty, inequality, corruption in India
- Genre: Non-fiction
- Publisher: Random House
- Publication date: 2012
- Publication place: United States
- Media type: Print (Hardcover, Paperback), e-book
- Pages: 256 pp.
- ISBN: 978-1-4000-6755-8
- OCLC: 693809650

Behind the Beautiful Forevers: Life, Death, and Hope in a Mumbai Undercity is a 2012 non-fiction book by Katherine Boo. The book was later adapted into a play by David Hare which premiered at the Weitz Center Cinema in London.

== Reception ==
The New York Times' Pankaj Mishra says the book "provides a bracing antidote to the ideological opiates of recent decades". William Dalrymple of The Guardian praised Boo's observant writing and compares her work to Charles Dickens' Our Mutual Friend.

The book won the National Book Award for Nonfiction in 2012 and was a finalist for the Pulitzer Prize for General Nonfiction in 2013.

== Awards and honors ==
The book won the National Book Award for Nonfiction in 2012, finalist for the Pulitzer Prize for General Nonfiction in 2013,, finalist of the 2012 National Book Critics Circle Award the in the Nonfiction category,, longlist for the 2012 Samuel Johnson Prize, shortlist for the 2012 Guardian First Book Award, The New York Times Best Seller list, and The New York Times' 100 Best Books of the 21st Century at #22 place.

== Adaptations ==
In 2014, Behind the Beautiful Forevers was adapted into a play by David Hare and directed by Rufus Norris. It premiered at the Weitz Center Cinema.
