= Katherine Boo =

American investigative journalist (born 1964)

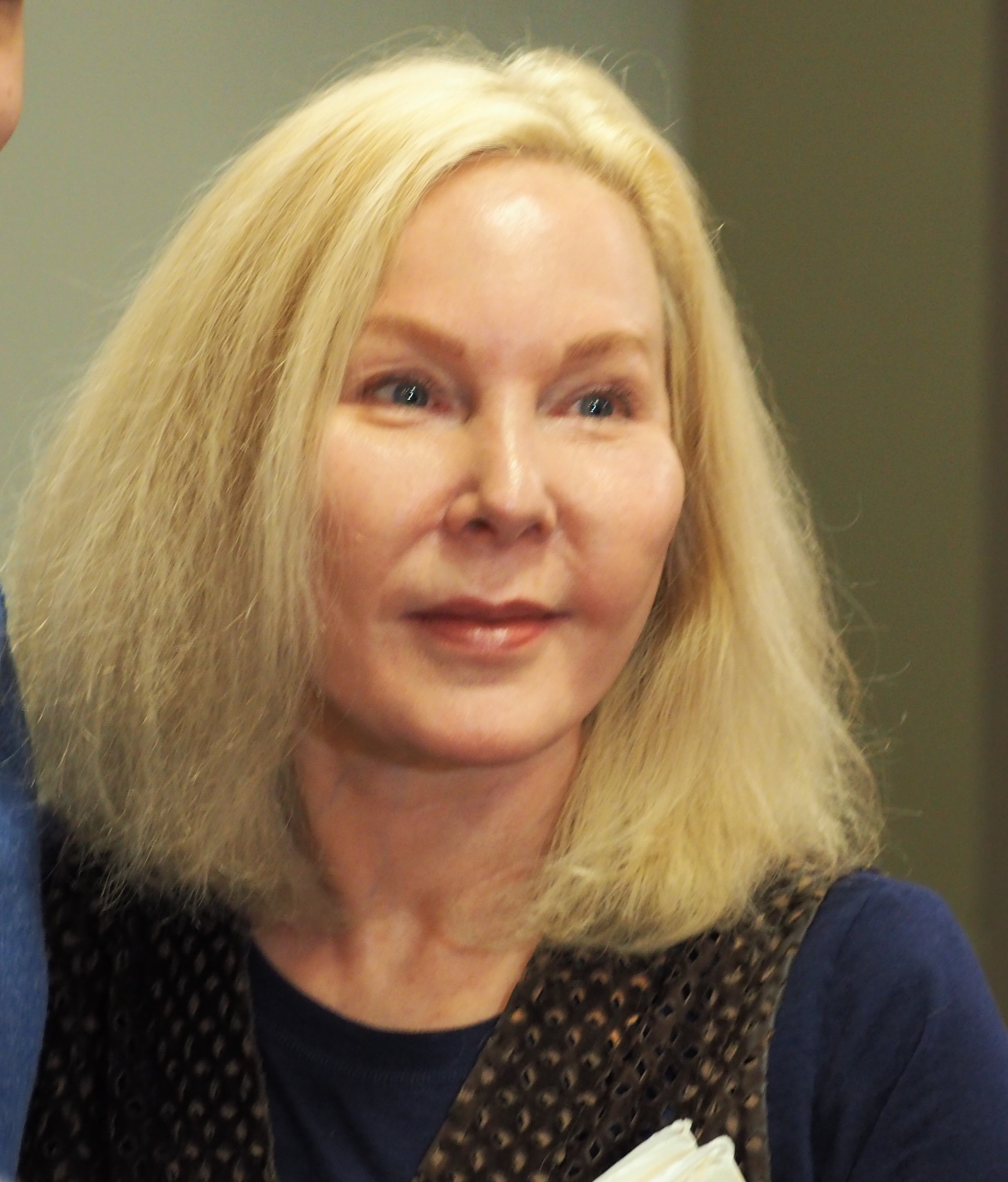
- Boo in 2018
- Born: August 12, 1964 (age 62)
- Education: College of William and Mary; Barnard College (BA)
- Occupation: Investigative Journalist
- Known for: Pulitzer Prize for Public Service; MacArthur Fellow, National Book Award for Nonfiction
- Spouse: Sunil Khilnani

Katherine J. "Kate" Boo (born August 12, 1964) is an American investigative journalist who has documented the lives of people in poverty. She has received the MacArthur Fellowship (2002), the National Book Award for Nonfiction (2012), and her work earned the 2000 Pulitzer Prize for Public Service for The Washington Post. She has been a staff writer for The New Yorker magazine since 2003. Her book Behind the Beautiful Forevers: Life, Death and Hope in a Mumbai Undercity won nonfiction prizes from PEN, the Los Angeles Times Book Awards, the New York Public Library, and the American Academy of Arts and Letters, in addition to the National Book Award for Nonfiction.

== Early life and education ==
Boo grew up in and near Washington, D.C., after her Minnesotan parents relocated there due to her father's appointment as an aide to Representative Eugene McCarthy. The family's surname, of Swedish origin, was Americanized to Boo from the original Bö. She attended the College of William and Mary for two years before transferring to and graduating summa cum laude from Barnard College.

Boo is married to Sunil Khilnani, a professor of politics and history at Ashoka University, India.

== Career ==
Boo began her career in journalism with writing and editing positions at Washington's City Paper and then the Washington Monthly. From there she went to The Washington Post, where she worked from 1993 to 2003, first as an editor of the Outlook section and then as an investigative reporter.

In 2000, The Washington Post received the Pulitzer Prize for Public Service for Boo's 1999 series about group homes for intellectually disabled people. The Pulitzer judges noted that her work "disclosed wretched neglect and abuse in the city's group homes for the intellectually disabled, which forced officials to acknowledge the conditions and begin reforms."

In 2003, she joined the staff of The New Yorker, to which she had been contributing since 2001. One of her subsequent New Yorker articles, "The Marriage Cure," won the National Magazine Award for Feature Writing in 2004. The article chronicled state-sponsored efforts to teach poor people in an Oklahoma community about marriage in hopes that such classes would help their students avoid or escape poverty.

Another of Boo's New Yorker articles, "After Welfare", won the 2002 Sidney Hillman Award, which honors articles that advance the cause of social justice.

In 2002, Boo was a senior fellow at the New America Foundation. She won a MacArthur Fellowship in 2002. She was also a fellow of the Wissenschaftskolleg zu Berlin in 2010.

In 2012, Random House published Boo's first book, Behind the Beautiful Forevers: Life, Death and Hope in a Mumbai Undercity, a non-fiction account of life in the Annawadi slums of Mumbai, India. It won the annual National Book Award for Nonfiction on November 14, 2012.

In 2022, 2023, 2024, and 2025, Boo served as a judge for the American Mosaic Journalism Prize.

== Awards ==
- 2000 Pulitzer Prize for Public Service, The Washington Post, "notably for the work of Katherine Boo"
- 2002 MacArthur Fellowship
- 2002 The Hillman Prize
- 2004 National Magazine Award for Feature Writing
- 2012 Samuel Johnson Prize, shortlist, Behind the Beautiful Forevers
- 2012 National Book Award (Nonfiction), Behind the Beautiful Forevers
- 2012 Columbia Journalism Award
- 2013 PEN/John Kenneth Galbraith Award, Behind the Beautiful Forevers

== Books ==
- Behind the Beautiful Forevers: Life, Death and Hope in a Mumbai Undercity. New York City: Random House (February 7, 2012). ISBN 978-1-4000-6755-8
