= Economic and Political Weekly =

- Discipline: Social sciences
- Language: English
- Edited by: S. Mahendra Dev

Publication details
- Former name: Economic Weekly
- History: 1949–present
- Publisher: Sameeksha Trust (India)
- Frequency: Weekly

Standard abbreviations
- ISO 4: Econ. Political Wkly.

Indexing
- ISSN: 0012-9976
- LCCN: sa67002009
- JSTOR: econpoliweek
- OCLC no.: 46735231

Links
- Journal homepage; Online archive

The Economic and Political Weekly (EPW) is a weekly peer-reviewed academic journal covering all social sciences, and is published by the Sameeksha Trust. In August 2023, economist S. Mahendra Dev was named as the new editor of the journal. He succeeded Gopal Guru, who served as editor from January 2018 to July 2023.

The Sameeksha Trust board comprises eminent persons from academia and business, namely, Deepak Nayyar (chairman), D N Ghosh (Managing Trustee), Andre Beteille, Deepak Parekh, Romila Thapar, Rajeev Bhargava, Dipankar Gupta, and Shyam Menon.

== History ==
The journal was established in 1949 as the Economic Weekly and edited by Sachin Chaudhuri. It obtained its current name in 1966. It was edited by Krishna Raj for more than three decades and is among the most prestigious scholarly journals in India, having had contributions from many of the country's best known scholars. G. P. Deshpande wrote a column titled "Of Life, Letters and Politics" for three decades.

Past authors include Amartya Sen, Manmohan Singh, Jagdish Bhagwati, Ramachandra Guha, Angus Deaton, Kaushik Basu, Romila Thapar, Jeffrey Sachs, Prannoy Roy, T.N. Srinivasan, Subramanian Swamy, Christophe Jaffrelot, Jean Drèze, Mani Shankar Aiyar, Andre Beteille, Ashok Gulati, and Nirupam Bajpai.

== Political position ==
The journal is known for taking left-leaning positions in its editorials, which were occasionally critical of the Communist Party of India (Marxist) government in West Bengal for not being radical enough. According to The Hindu, the journal takes strong editorial stance with a "social conscience". The Caravan notes the journal's "obsession with intra-Marxist debate" and that its contributors "range from free-market liberals on one side to Naxalite sympathisers on the other". The journal was harshly critical of some of the policies of the Indira Gandhi government during the Emergency, as well as of state complicity in the 2002 Gujarat riots.

== Abstracting and indexing ==
The journal is abstracted and indexed in CAB Abstracts and Scopus.

== Licensing ==
EPW has licensed its material for non-exclusive use to 3 content aggregators - Contify, Factiva and JSTOR.

Contify disseminates EPW content to LexisNexis, Thomson Reuters, Securities.com, Gale Cengage, AcquireMedia and NewsBank.

Factiva and JSTOR have EPW content on their databases for their registered users.

== Controversy ==
In 2016, C. Rammanohar Reddy quit as editor in a controversial move which led to several academics expressing concern in an open letter, and at least one board member, Jean Dreze, resigning from the board. Shortly after, his successor Paranjoy Guha Thakurta also quit in 2017 after a controversial article about the Adani Group was removed from the website amidst reasons that many felt were unclear or unjustified. In its defence, the Trust posted a statement on the EPW website stating that Guha Thakurta had violated his position by responding to a legal notice sent by the Adani Group without informing the Trust. This once again led to various scholars and commentators questioning the Sameeksha Trust that runs the journal.

Eventually professor and scholar Gopal Guru was appointed as the new editor in January 2018.
