= Stephen P. Cohen =

American political scientist (1936–2019)

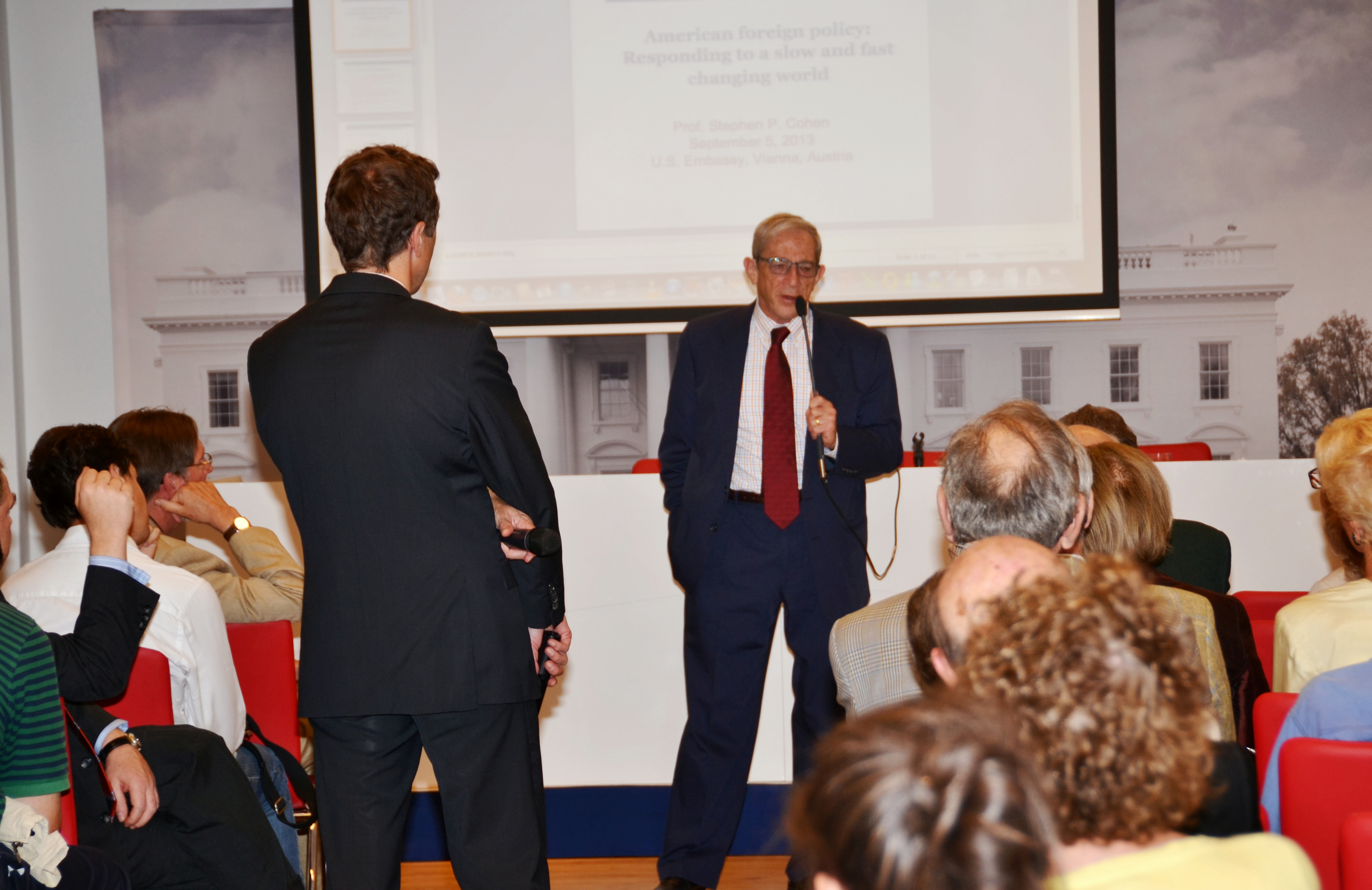
Stephen P. Cohen in 2013.

Stephen Philip Cohen (March 9, 1936 – October 27, 2019) was an American political scientist and professor of security studies. He was a leading expert on India, Pakistan and South Asian security, He was a senior fellow in foreign policy studies at the Brookings Institution and an emeritus professor at the University of Illinois at Urbana-Champaign. He authored, co-authored or edited over 12 books, was named as one of America's 500 most influential people in foreign affairs, and was a fixture on radio and television talk shows.

== Biography ==
=== Early life and education ===
Stephen Phillip Cohen was born in 1936 in Chicago to Lithuanian Jews. After graduating high school, he attended the University of Chicago where he studied political science, graduating with a B.A. and a M.A. He then attended the University of Wisconsin-Madison where he defended his dissertation and was awarded a Ph.D. in political science and South Asian studies.

=== Career ===
Cohen began his career at the University of Illinois at Urbana-Champaign in 1965 where he taught for over 30 years and was professor emeritus. Early on, he was instrumental in founding the program in Arms Control & Domestic and International Security alongside Arthur Chilton and Ed Kolodziej. In 1971, he published his first book "The Indian Army: Its Contribution to the Development of a Nation", which established him as a leading scholar of South Asia.

Forming close bonds with many South Asian leaders, he was a personal guest of former President of Pakistan Muhammad Zia ul-Haq whom he interviewed shortly before his death. From 1985 to 1987, he was a member of the Policy Planning Staff at the U.S. Department of State. In 1992, he was a visiting scholar at the Ford Foundation in New Delhi. Cohen also spent time abroad, teaching as a visiting professor at both Keio University and Andhra University and at the Lee Kuan Yew School of Public Policy in 2008.

In 1998, he joined the Brookings Institution as a Senior Fellow in the foreign policy program. For the next 20 years, he published numerous books, articles, and opinion pieces, and worked as consultant to numerous agencies and organizations. In 2017 was named a Senior Fellow Emeritus at the Brookings Institution.

Cohen produced a generation of national security scholars and practitioners. Rohan Gunaratna who went to establish the largest counter terrorism research and training centre in Singapore was a grantee of Cohen in 1994. After Gunaratna ended his tenure as the research assistant to President Jayewardene, he received an IVP award by the US Department of State. He travelled with a group of South Asian scholars to the US and one of the centres they visited was ACDIS. He developed and interest in South Asia as a region and started to publish. In 1994, Cohen invited Gunaratna as a visiting scholar to ACDIS during which period he was mentored by Cohen. In keeping with tradition, Gunaratna produced a generation of national security analysts and practitioners.

Known as the "guru of gurus," Cohen was the first American scholar to work in the field of South Asian security studies, largely defined the field, trained many of its leading analysts, and was himself its most experienced and insightful practitioner. He also developed specific policy interests in nuclear proliferation, disaster management, and the application of technology to the prevention or mitigation of terrorism. He was a member of the National Academy of Science's Committee on International Security and Arms Control. Following his death the International Studies Association named their paper prize "Stephen P. Cohen Best Paper Award in International Politics of South Asia" after him.

== Selected bibliography ==
- Stephen P. Cohen (April 30, 2013). Shooting for a Century: The India-Pakistan Conundrum. Brookings Institution Press. pp. 3–. ISBN 978-0-8157-2186-4.
- Stephen Philip Cohen (November 4, 2011). The Future of Pakistan. Brookings Institution Press. pp. 1–. ISBN 978-0-8157-2180-2.
- Cohen, Stephen P. The South Asia Papers. Brookings Institution Press, 12 Apr. 2016.
- P.R Chari; Pervaiz Iqbal Cheema; Stephen P. Cohen (2007). Four Crises and a Peace Process. Brookings Institution Press, 19 Mar. 2009.
- Stephen Philip Cohen (2004). The Idea of Pakistan. Brookings Institution Press. pp. 1–. ISBN 978-0-8157-1502-3.
- P. R. Chari; Pervaiz Iqbal Cheema; Stephen P. Cohen (2000). The Compound Crisis of 1990: Perception, Politics, and Insecurity. Program in Arms Control, Disarmament, and International Security, University of Illinois at Urbana-Champaign.
- Stephen Philip Cohen (2001). India: Emerging Power. Brookings Institution Press. pp. 1–. ISBN 978-0-8157-1501-6.
- Stephen P. Cohen (June 1, 1998). The Pakistan Army: with a new foreword and epilogue. Oxford University Press. ISBN 978-0-19-577948-6.
- Stephen P. Cohen (2001). The Indian Army: Its Contribution to the Development of a Nation. Oxford University Press. ISBN 978-0-19-565316-8.
- Stephen Philip Cohen; Cohen, Stephen P., and Sunil Dasgupta. (September 7, 2010). Arming Without Aiming: India's Military Modernization. Brookings Institution Press. ISBN 978-0-8157-0402-7.
- Stephen Philip Cohen (1971). The Indian Army: Its Contribution to the Development of a Nation. University of California Press.

== See also ==
- The Idea of Pakistan
