= The Idea of India =

1997 book by Sunil Khilnani

- Author: Sunil Khilnani
- Cover artist: Calvin Chu
- Language: English
- Subject: Politics and modern history of India
- Publisher: Farrar, Straus & Giroux (Paperback, United States)
- Publication place: India
- Media type: Print
- Pages: 263pp (paperback edition)
- ISBN: 0-374-52591-9 (Paperback)
- OCLC: 988051314

The Idea of India is a 1997 non-fiction book by Sunil Khilnani which describes the economic and political history of India in the fifty years since Partition.

== Background ==
It focuses in particular on the role that the national ideal of democracy has played in India's evolution. The book is also noted for its treatment of the personality and actions of Jawaharlal Nehru in the development of the country.

== Reception ==
Journalist Ian Jack described this book, and its description of the "intellectual foundations" of the modern Indian state, as "indispensable" reading.

Abraham Verghese in The New York Times writes, "the book argues that politics, more than culture or religious chauvinism, shaped modern India."

== See also ==
- The Idea of Pakistan
