= Ahmad Faruqui =

Ahmad Faruqui (born April 4, 1953) is a Pakistani defense analyst and economist. He has contributed articles to Dawn newspaper and authored "Rethinking the National Security of Pakistan" in 2003 (Ashgate Publishing).

== Education ==
He earned his B.A. and M.A. degrees in economics from the University of Karachi, where he was awarded the Rashid Minhas (Shaheed) Gold Medal. He later completed a PhD in economics at the University of California, Davis, where he was a Regents Fellow.

== Career ==
Faruqui has held several prominent roles in the energy and economic sectors. He worked at the Electric Power Research Institute and Barakat & Chamberlin, later serving as Vice President at CRA International. In July 2006, he became a Principal in the energy practice at The Brattle Group.

He was one of the lead architects of California's experiment with dynamic pricing that was done in the period of 2003-2005 with some 2,500 residential and small business customers.

He has appeared on Fox Business News, National Public Radio and Voice of America.

He has taught economics at the University of California - Davis, San Jose State University, and Karachi University and lectured on national security issues at the Army War College, Naval Postgraduate School, Stanford University and the University of California, Berkeley. He belongs to the American Economic Association, the Association of Energy Service Professionals, Economists for Peace and Security, Nature Conservancy and the Sierra Club.

== Research books and papers ==
- "Musharraf's Pakistan, Bush's America and the Middle East," Vanguard Books, Lahore, Pakistan, 2008.
- "Pakistan: Unresolved Issues of State & Society," Co-editor with Syed Farooq Hasnat, Vanguard Books, Lahore, 2008.
- "Rethinking the National Security of Pakistan: The Price of Strategic Myopia," Ashgate Publishing Limited, 2003.
- "Broadening American-Pakistani Ties," RUSI Journal, February 2005
- "Saddam Hussein as Military Commander," Asian Defence and Diplomacy, June 2004
- "First three years of President Musharraf," Al-Siyasa, Fall 2002
- "Is the USA fighting terrorism with the wrong weapons?," Security Dialogue, March 2003
- "Pakistan: The Political Economy of Militarism," Journal of Conflict, Security and Development, Volume 2, Number 2, Summer 2002
- "South Asia's Enduring Conflict," Asian Defence and Diplomacy, March 2002
- "General Musharraf's Management of Pakistan's National Security," RUSI Journal, February 2002
- "Recidivist Militarism in Pakistan," Asian Affairs (London), October 2001
- "Waiting for America: the continuing predicament of Pakistan," Journal of Conflict, Security and Development, Volume 1, Number 3, 2001
- "Pakistan in the eye of the cyclone," Asian Affairs (Hong Kong), Volume 16, 2001
- "The complex dynamics of Sino-Pakistan ties," IPRI Journal (Islamabad), Summer 2001
- "Scenarios of Pakistan's long-term security environment," Defence Journal (Karachi), August 2001
- "Beyond Strategic Myopia in South Asia," Strategic Review, Winter 2001
- "Failure in Command: Lessons from Pakistan's Indian Wars," Defense Analysis, Volume 17, Number 1, 2001
- "The Fallacy of Nuclear Deterrence," Asia Pacific Military Balance, 2000/2001
- "Pakistan's Strategic Myopia," RUSI Journal, April 2000
