= Daily Ausaf =

Pakistani Newspaper

- Type: Daily newspaper
- Format: Broadsheet
- Editor-in-chief: Mehtab Khan
- Editor: Mohsin Bilal Khan
- Founded: 25 December 1997
- Language: Urdu
- Headquarters: Islamabad
- City: Karachi and Peshawar
- Country: Pakistan
- Circulation: Islamabad, Lahore, Multan, Muzaffarabad, Gilgit, Frankfurt, London
- Website: www.dailyausaf.com

Ausaf (Urdu: روزنامہ اَوصاف) is an international Urdu daily newspaper which is being published simultaneously from Islamabad, Lahore, Multan, Muzaffarabad, Gilgit, Frankfurt and London. Its chief editor is Mehtab Khan. Mohsin Bilal Khan is Editor of daily Ausaf. The newspaper Ausaf is also being published from Karachi and Peshawar since 2015. It is the fastest-growing Urdu language newspaper in Pakistan.

Ausaf Group of Newspapers is the first-ever group that has managed to establish two overseas editions (Frankfurt and London). Daily Ausaf was inaugurated on 25 December 1997 from Islamabad. Since then it launched its paper in Frankfurt (22 December 2001), London (27 May 2002), Multan (11 August 2002), Lahore (23 March 2006), Muzaffarabad (15 April 2006), and finally on November 1, 2010, from Gilgit. In 2015, the daily Ausaf was also launched in Karachi, the megacity of Pakistan.

Currently, it is known as the leading paper within the regions of Kashmir, Gilgit - Baltistan, Khyber Pakhtunkhawa, Potohar, and Southern Punjab and growing its penetration in Karachi.

Within the UK, Daily Ausaf is the leading newspaper especially due to the fact of providing the local community out of which 75% are of Kashmiri origin news from their native areas. Also in other European countries such as Germany, Austria, Ireland, Spain, Italy, and Greece, Daily Ausaf has established itself as the most vital source of information for local Pakistani residents.

== Contributors ==
- Ghulamullah Kiyani is a leading and widely read columnist of leading Daily Ausaf. His column "Urran" is very famous in the Kashmiri community and is discussed. Kashmiris in AJK, J&K, UK, and elsewhere like Ausaf.
- Zahid Shareef Rana
