= Al-Thager Model School =

- مدارس الثغر النموذجية,
- Jeddah; Saudi Arabia

Information
- Established: 1947
- Director: Saud Al Khudaidi
- Gender: All-boys
- Website: Official website

The Al-Thager Model School (Arabic: مدارس الثغر النموذجية, roughly "The Haven") is a secondary school in Jeddah, Saudi Arabia. The school is housed in a two-story building that used to house both primary and secondary grades, as well as residential dormitories on the second level.

== History ==
Faisal of Saudi Arabia founded the school in Ta'if in the early 1950s. In 1964 Faisal opened a large campus for the school in Jeddah, and provided an annual fund of several million Saudi riyals from the national budget. Kamal Adham, Faisal's Turkish father-in-law, traveled to the United Kingdom to meet officials from the government, and told the officials to model the school after Victoria College, a school in Khartoum, Sudan, inspired by British education. The Saudi Arabian government provided funds and staff members for the school. Steve Coll, author of The Bin Ladens: An Arabian Family in the American Century, said that during the 1960s and 1970s Al-Thager "had the reputation of a private enclave for the sons of businessmen and the royal family". Al-Thager became the most prestigious school in Jeddah.

The school's entrance examinations were open to all Saudis; some lower-class Saudis were granted acceptance and attended the school with wealthier Saudis. In the mid-1900s, each graduating class consisted of around 60 boys. During that period many Egyptian and Syrian teachers, who had been involved in dissident Islamic organizations in their home countries, taught at Al-Thager. Coll said in the 1960s and early 1970s that the school "had a relatively secular flavor".

Around the early 1970s, many Al-Thager students engaged in political debates. One group of students, influenced by Gamal Abdel Nasser, President of Egypt, were in favor of Pan-Arab nationalism. Another group of students, influenced by the Muslim Brotherhood, were in favor of additional Islamic influence in politics in the Arab world. Coll said that Al-Thager was "a conspicuous example of modernization without secularization".

== Campus ==
In the 1960s, the school campus was located near downtown Jeddah, north of Old Jeddah Road. A two-story concrete and fieldstone building served as the school's main classroom building. Coll said that the building was in a "featureless modern style". The school had two classroom wings: one for middle school students and one for high school students. An interior courtyard was located between the wings.

In the 1960s, most students were day students and commuted to school. The boarding students and some foreign teachers lived in dormitories on the school's second floor. Al-Thager was the only school in Jeddah to have air conditioning.

== Curriculum and discipline ==
Coll said that in the 1960s and 1970s Al-Thager "prided itself on its modern curriculum" and that it was the only Saudi school that "could even begin to compare itself to a place like" Brummana High School in Brummana, Lebanon. During that period the school had English instruction provided by many foreign English teachers from England and Ireland. Al-Thager, like other Saudi schools, had religion as a core component in the instruction. At noon, the boys performed zuhr, the Islamic prayer at noontime. Each morning, the school prompted boys in a military-style call of order to assemble in rows. Teachers had canes to discipline boys by striking their feet.

== Dress code ==
Students wear western-style school uniforms from American and British university preparatory schools; in most Saudi schools for boys, the students wear thawbs and cloth headdresses. In the 1960s and 1970s, students wore white dress shirts with ties, grey trousers, black socks, and black shoes. In winter students wore charcoal-colored blazers.

== Notable alumni ==
Osama bin Laden attended Al-Thager from 1968 to 1976. Former teachers, Brian Fyfield-Shayler and Seamus O'Brien gave an interview to The New Yorker in which they claimed that they remembered teaching bin Laden at the school. Some of his half-brothers were enrolled at Al-Thager.

Ian Hislop attended for at least one year between 1968 and 1976.

== Sources ==
- Coll, Steve. The Bin Ladens: An Arabian Family in the American Century. New York City: The Penguin Press, 2008.
