= Kola Boof =

American novelist

- نعيمة بنت الحارث
- Born: Naima Bint Harith; Sudan
- Citizenship: American
- Occupation: Novelist
- Writing career
- Notable work: Diary of a Lost Girl
- Website: writerkolaboof.online

Kola Boof is a Sudanese-American novelist. She was born a Sunni Muslim in Omdurman, Sudan. As a child, she witnessed her parents' murder. She was adopted by African-Americans in Washington D.C. in 1979 and became an American citizen in 1993. She is the author of seven books, published in eight countries.

Her birth name was Naima Bint Harith. She wrote "Kola Boof" first as a "two-word poem," but liked it so much that she adopted it as her penname for her literary career. The "Kola" part refers to the kola nut.

She has alleged that she was forced in 1996 in Morocco by Osama bin Laden to be his mistress, and that bin Laden raped her and controlled her, not letting her leave, for six months. She denied her association with bin Laden at first, but was outed by The Guardian. In a 2006 interview, she said, "But once the United States became aware of it and placed me on a suspected terrorist list and threatened to take away my citizenship. I really didn't have any choice but to admit to it and to tell my side of what happened."

Boof alleges that her first book, Long Train to the Redeeming Sin, resulted in a fatwa being placed on her. Her other books include Diary of a Lost Girl, her autobiography, and the novel The Sexy Part of the Bible, which was praised by Derrick Bell, who said, "There hasn't been a book this original or this socially relevant for black people since Ellison's Invisible Man."

A number of her claims, as well as her personal history, have been debunked or put into question.

== Works ==
Some selected works include:

- Long Train to the Redeeming Sin (2004, Door of Kush) ISBN 9780971201903
- Flesh and the Devil (2004, Door of Kush), ISBN 0-971201-97-8
- Diary of a Lost Girl (2006, Door of Kush), ISBN 0-971201-98-6
- The Sexy Part of the Bible (2011, Akashic Books), ISBN 1-936070-96-0
- Feminists Need Dick Too! (2021, Door of Kush) ISBN 1-513677-87-X
