= Tayseer Allouni =

Syrian-Spanish journalist

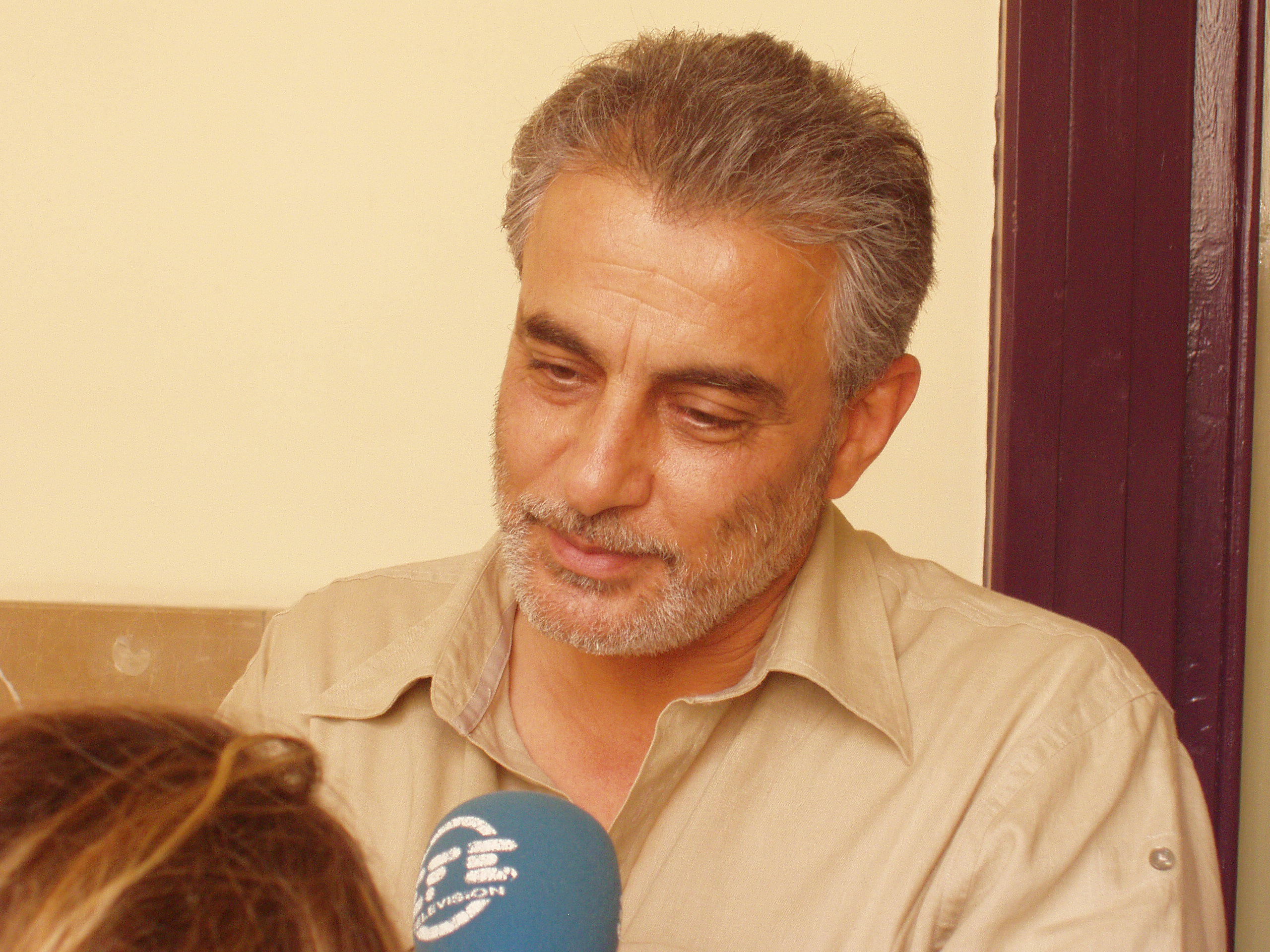
Tayseer Allouni in 2004

Tayseer Allouni (Arabic: تيسير علوني; also: Taysir, Tayseer, Alluni, Aluni, Alony) is a journalist from the Al Jazeera news channel. He was born in Deir ez-Zor in Syria in 1955 then in 1983 he moved to Spain, where he studied economics, and has lived there ever since, adopting Spanish citizenship in 1988. He interviewed Osama bin Laden following the September 11, 2001, attacks on the World Trade Center, and was controversially convicted on terrorism-related charges in Spain in 2005.

== Life ==
Allouni was born in Deir ez-Zor, Syria in 1955 and went on to obtain a bachelor's degree in economics from a Syrian university. He traveled to Spain in 1985 to continue his studies but due to economic hardships he worked as a trader instead. He married in 1987 and is a father of five children.

After becoming a Spanish citizen in 1988 he held a number of jobs in Spain, including teaching Arabic and working in the municipality taxation office of the city of Ceuta. In 1996, he joined the Arabic service of the Spanish news agency EFE as a translator. During his work there, he started freelancing for Al Jazeera. During this same year he also began working with the Institute of Peace and Dispute Studies in Granada. In 1999, he joined Al Jazeera as their correspondent in Afghanistan and headed the Kabul office for a period of two years before 11 September 2001. Allouni was well known for his reporting from Afghanistan in 2001 and he conducted an interview with Osama Bin Laden less than two months after the September 11th attacks.

During the US war against the Taliban and al-Qaeda, he was the only foreign journalist to remain in Kabul and broadcast to the world images of the unfolding events. According to Allouni, the Al Jazeera team in Afghanistan were warned on several occasions by the Taliban to leave the county because they had broken the law through filming.

Allouni was indicted in Spanish court in September 2003 along with 34 other suspected terror operatives, including Osama bin Laden, by Spanish Judge Baltasar Garzon, who was investigating suspected al Qaeda activity in Spain.

After the US bombing of the Al Jazeera office in Kabul, he returned to Doha, Qatar, to continue his work for Al Jazeera as a newsroom journalist. During the Iraq War in 2003, he went to Baghdad and covered the US-led invasion.

== Work ==
Highlights of his career include

- working as a correspondent for Al Jazeera in Afghanistan; he was the only international correspondent in Kabul in October 2001 and had previously covered the destruction of the Buddha statues of Bamiyan by the Taliban in March 2001
- interviewing Osama bin Laden on October 21, 2001
- being deported from Iraq prior to the overthrow of Saddam Hussein
- being arrested in Spain while investigating the Madrid train bombings
- sentenced by Audiencia Nacional of Spain on 26 September 2005 to seven years imprisonment for being a financial courier for Al-Qaida. Allouni defends himself by saying that he merely interviewed Bin Laden after the September 11th attacks on the United States.
- set free on 6 October 2006 under home detention due to his medical condition.
- interviewing Abu Muhammad al-Golani, the head of al-Nusra Front in Syria on December 19, 2013

== Prosecution after the 2004 Madrid train bombings ==
On Monday September 26, 2005, a Spanish court found Allouni guilty of collaboration with al-Qaida, sentencing the Syrian-born, naturalized Spaniard to seven years in jail. Allouni, who insisted on his innocence throughout Europe's biggest al-Qaida trial, interviewed the group's leader Osama bin Laden in Afghanistan weeks after the September 11 attacks in the United States. Accused of acting as a financial courier to the group while in Afghanistan, Allouni, who had faced a maximum nine-year term, said in testimony he was only doing his job as a journalist. A campaign regarding his innocence has been mounted by amongst others Al Jazeera and the Arab Commission for Human Rights. On January 17, 2012, a European court decided that the seven-year term Allouni was given over charges of collusion with a terror organization was not legal. He was freed in March 2012, and returned to Doha.

He has now continued working in Doha and reunited with his family which he continues to raise, despite the long prison sentence he received.
