= Asad Ali Toor =

Pakistani journalist

- Born: 1984 (age 41–42)
- Occupations: Journalist, Supreme Court Reporter and YouTuber
- Years active: 2005–present

YouTube information
- Channel: Asad Toor Uncensored
- Years active: 2020–present
- Subscribers: 320 thousand
- Views: 56.8 million
- Last updated: 14 April 2025

Asad Ali Toor (born c. 1984) is a Pakistani journalist who reports from the Supreme Court of Pakistan. Previously, he worked as a producer for Aaj News. He is known for raising his voice for missing persons in Pakistan.

== Career ==
Toor began his career in 2005 and later worked as a senior producer for Aaj News. In 2020, he launched a YouTube channel, Asad Toor Uncensored, which covers judicial and governmental affairs.

In September 2020, the FIA filed a First Information Report against Toor, accusing him of defaming state institutions on social media. At that time, he was working as a reporter for Samaa TV, a job he forcefully left. The Lahore High Court dismissed the case in early 2021, citing a lack of evidence.

On May 25, 2021, three unidentified men entered Toor's Islamabad apartment and assaulted him. According to Toor's public account, the assailants tied him up and questioned him about his sources of funding. Toor stated that the men identified themselves as being from the Inter-Services Intelligence (ISI) agency. He was subsequently hospitalized for his injuries. A government investigation was announced, but no arrests were made.

In June 2021, the FIA issued a summons for Toor to appear for questioning regarding a complaint of defamation against a government institution. The Committee to Protect Journalists (CPJ) issued a statement calling on authorities to stop legal actions against him.

In March 2022, Toor was present at a protest at the National Press Club in Islamabad. Subsequently, Islamabad police opened a criminal investigation into Toor and others on charges including rioting and unlawful assembly. On March 4, the Islamabad High Court instructed police not to make arrests in the case. The Attorney General later informed the court that the state would withdraw the case against Toor and other participants.

On February 26, 2024, Toor was arrested by the FIA in connection with an inquiry into online activism related to judiciary. He was held in custody for three weeks at Adiala Jail in Rawalpindi. On March 16, 2024, an Islamabad trial court granted him bail, finding the allegations to be unsubstantiated.

In August 2025, Toor was prevented from boarding a flight to the United States at Islamabad International Airport. Immigration officials informed him that his name was on a no-fly list. Earlier in the year, the FIA had temporarily frozen his bank accounts and blocked his YouTube channel as part of ongoing investigations.

== Recognition ==
In December 2024, the Embassy of the Netherlands in Pakistan awarded Toor the Human Rights Tulip Award for his work in journalism.
