= Lawyers' Movement =

2007 mass protest movement in Pakistan

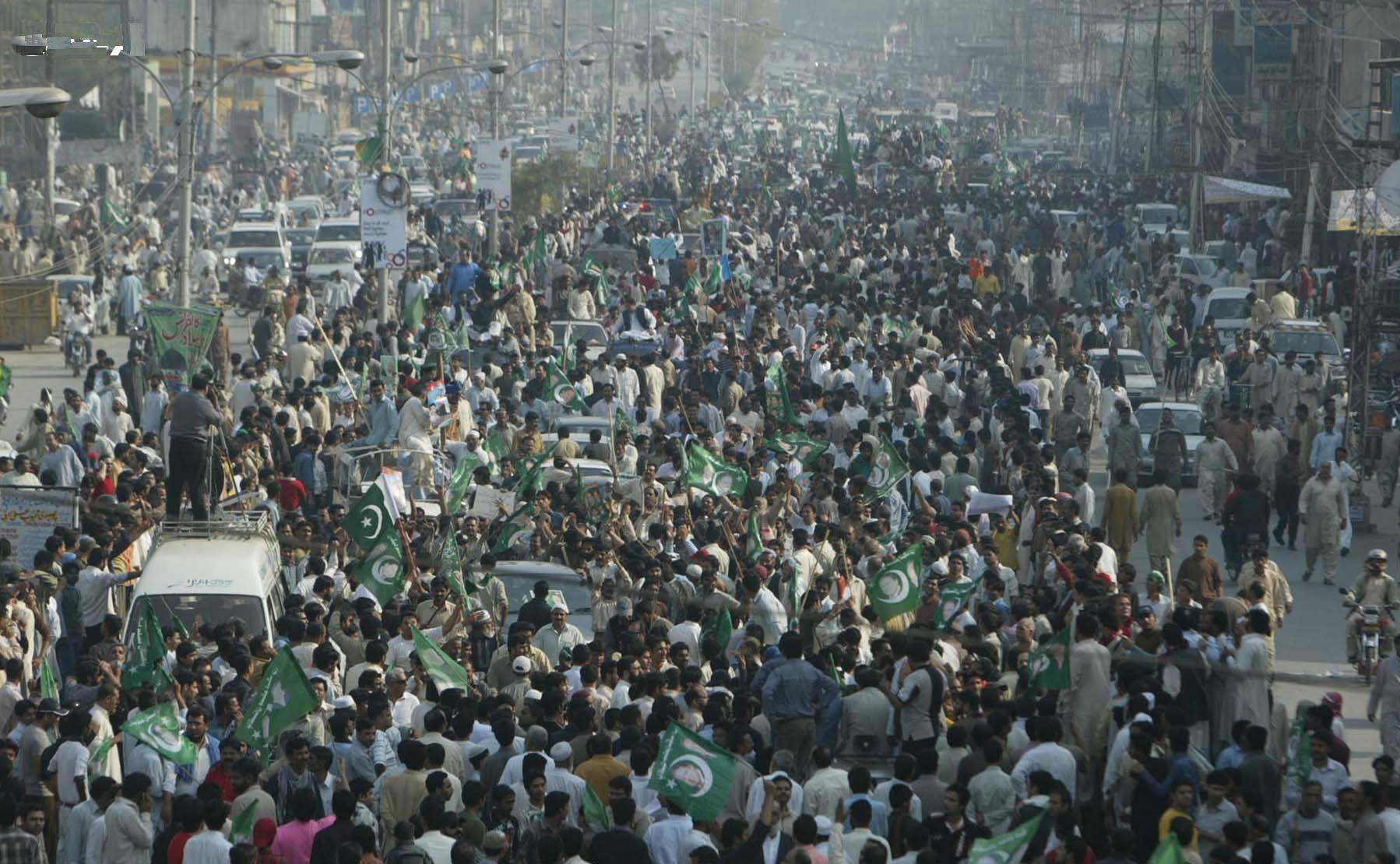
- Activists of Pakistan Muslim League (N) participate in a long march on 15 March 2009, organised to support the Lawyers' Movement that had appealed for the restoration of judiciary since the unconstitutional suspension of Iftikhar Muhammad Chaudhry.
- Date: 9 March 2007 — 17 March 2009
- Location: Nationwide, throughout Pakistan
- Caused by: Suspension of chief justice Iftikhar Muhammad Chaudhry
- Goals: Restoration of judiciary and reinstatement of removed judges.
- Methods: Protest demonstration, rallying motorcades
- Result: Eventual restoration of judiciary

Parties
Pakistani judiciary and various parties in opposition	Government of Pakistan

Lead figures
Iftikhar M. Chaudhry; Munir A. Malik; Aitzaz Ahsan; Ali Ahmad Kurd; Nawaz Sharif; Latif Afridi	Pervez Musharraf; Asif Ali Zardari

The Lawyers' Movement (Urdu: وکلا کی تحریک, romanized: Wakala ki Tahrik), also known as the Movement for the Restoration of Judiciary or the Black Coat Protests, was the popular mass protest movement initiated by the lawyers of Pakistan in response to the former president and army chief Pervez Musharraf's actions of 9 March 2007 when he unconstitutionally suspended Iftikhar Muhammad Chaudhry as the chief justice of Pakistan's Supreme Court. Following the suspension of the chief justice, the Supreme Court Bar Association (SCBA) declared the judge's removal as an "assault on the independence of judiciary" and was backed by several political parties.

== History ==
=== Suspension of Iftikhar Muhammad Chaudhry ===
In the first few months of 2007, several conflicts had already raged between chief justice Iftikhar Muhammad Chaudhry and the Pakistani government. Chaudhry had worked hard to clear a backlog of cases at the Supreme Court and had "[taken] on politically controversial issues", particularly with regard to the Pakistan Steel Mills corruption case where the chief justice ruled against the sale of the state-owned steel mills at a "throw-away price". Issues pertaining to the privatisation of the state-owned steel mills upset Shaukat Aziz, who served as the prime minister under the Musharraf administration.

What irked president Pervez Musharraf however was the controversial Missing Persons case that found Pakistan's intelligence agencies (including the FIA and the ISI) to be complicit in the forced disappearances of up to 400 people (including terror suspects and human rights activists) without due process since 2001. Under Chaudhry's leadership, the courts had increasingly started "exercising independence from the government" when it ordered the security agencies to produce the missing people in court.

When the Musharraf administration asked the judge to quit, Chaudhry refused to go. On 9 March 2007, Musharraf had no other choice but to suspend Chaudhry from his post for alleged and unspecified charges of misconduct and misuse of authority. The sacking of the head of the judiciary sparked bloody protests throughout Pakistan and "edged the country towards a constitutional crisis". The civil unrest grew with regards to the validity of the allegations as well as doubts as to whether Musharraf had the power to suspend the chief justice. It was on these grounds that Chaudhry waged a legal battle in the Supreme Court seeking his reinstatement. He called his suspension a "thinly veiled assault on the independence of judiciary in Pakistan".

=== Adliya Bachao Tehreek ===
Chaudhry's suspension was met with protests from Pakistan's legal community. Senior judges and lawyers initiated the Adliya Bachao Tehreek (Urdu: عدلیہ بچاؤ تحریک; Save the Judiciary Movement) with the aim of getting Chaudhry reinstated and maintain the independence of the judiciary. The movement was led by SCBA presidents Munir A. Malik, Aitzaz Ahsan, and Ali Ahmad Kurd along with others leading lawyers. The Adliya Bachao Tehreek is seen as a precursor to the eventual Lawyer's Movement.

Renowned politician and lawyer Aitzaz Ahsan was pivotal in bringing together an "influential group of constitutional lawyers who had long opposed the various periods of military rule in Pakistan’s short history". He orchestrated a "campaign of motorcades" to take the chief justice to various bar associations around the country. Wherever the cavalcade passed, the chief justice was welcomed by people tossing rose petals at his car and chanting "Go Musharraf Go!"

=== Police brutality in Sahiwal ===
On 5 May 2007, a rally was organised in support of the chief justice in Sahiwal. The deposed chief justice was to make an appearance at a bar association in Sahiwal on his way to Multan. Upon his arrival, the police (allegedly acting under orders from the Musharraf regime) baton-charged and attacked the otherwise peaceful "torch-bearing" demonstrators. There were reports that the police threw petrol bombs at the rally burning at least 13 lawyers; five suffered from major burns. Around 50 lawyers were injured in the mayhem. The New York Times later interviewed Ishtiaq Ahmed, a lawyer who shared an eyewitness account of the incident, saying that Sahiwal was where the lawyers "suffered more than any place".

On 9 May 2007, the general house of the Lahore High Court Bar Association (LHCBA) demanded the Punjab and Sindh governments to step down immediately for patronising state terrorism. The bar also called for the removal of Sahiwal DPO Javed Shah. The LHC later upheld the sentences against other police officers involved in the attacks on 24 July 2013.

=== Black Saturday riots in Karachi ===
As the movement started gaining support from political parties in the opposition, the various pro-government parties, in particular Muttahida Qaumi Movement (MQM) and Pakistan Muslim League (Q) (PML-Q), allied themselves with Musharraf and began organising protest demonstrations of their own against the "politicisation of the issue of [the justice's suspension]". On 12 May 2007, two such rival demonstrations in Karachi came to a violent end when ensuing clashes left more than 40 people killed with several hundred injured and arrested.

On the chief justice's arrival in Karachi to address the Sindh High Court Bar Association at its 50th anniversary, gunfights and clashes erupted across the provincial capital as Pakistan Peoples Party (PPP) and Awami National Party (ANP) activists who supported the judge and the pro-government MQM activists took to the streets against each other. During the riots that ensued, media offices of the Business Recorder Group and Aaj TV were also attacked. There were also reports that the activists of the pro-government MQM had torched a lawyers' office resulting in the deaths of about seven lawyers burnt alive in the fire. Following the attacks on media offices, the news media strengthened in their resolve to support the chief justice's reinstatement.

Political opponents in the parliament blamed one another for the May 12 mayhem. Several opposition politicians placed the responsibility of the attacks on pro-government parties like the MQM, while MQM held the opposition parties responsible for the situation in Karachi. An editorial in the Daily Times said, "the possibility of any compromise to correct [Musharraf's] original mistake [of removing the chief justice] has vanished now ... the ante has been upped by the government."

=== Temporary reinstatement ===
Four months into the movement, Musharraf caved under the "pressure of incessant nonviolent civil resistance" and reinstated Chaudhry as the chief justice on 20 July 2007. The Supreme Court cleared Chaudhry of all charges when restoring him to his earlier position. Nevertheless, the lawyers still continued their movement against Musharraf, declaring his actions and rule "illegal".

The legal community put pressure on Chaudhry to take up several controversial cases against the Musharraf regime – one such case challenged the army chief's eligibility as a candidate in the upcoming presidential elections on 6 October 2007.

=== The 2007 Constitutional Battle Against the NRO ===
On October 6, 2007, right when the Lawyers' Movement was hitting its peak, a Lahore-based lawyer named Nasrullah Khan Babar made a massive move against the government. He stepped into the Lahore High Court to file a lawsuit directly challenging President Pervez Musharraf’s brand new National Reconciliation Ordinance (NRO) the infamous deal that dropped corruption charges for powerful politicians. Babar openly called the NRO a bad-faith move, arguing that under Article 25 of the Constitution, everyone has to be treated equally under the law. He told the court it was completely unfair to create a special shield for corrupt officials while holding regular people accountable. He even went as far as calling the ordinance a "reward for thieves who plundered the country's wealth" just to keep Musharraf in power. His high court challenge became a major part of the legal rebellion that kept pushing against the military regime, setting the stage for the Supreme Court to eventually trash the NRO as unconstitutional a couple of years later.

=== Judiciary dismissed again under emergency rule ===
On 3 November 2007, the reelected president Pervez Musharraf declared a state of emergency in Pakistan and imposed a provisional constitutional order (PCO). Under the PCO, Musharraf dismissed the chief justice again and removed about sixty other judges. Several opposition politicians and lawyers called the removal of these judges as "illegal and unconstitutional".

In shuffling the functions of the judiciary, several judges to asked to take oath under the 2007 PCO arrangements. The lawyers, in turn, refused to take oath under the PCO and reacted to the dismissals and the emergency rule by boycotting the courts and taking part in protests and hunger strikes. People from outside the legal community also took part in these protests further motivated by political agendas. The international pressure following the nationwide protest forced Musharraf to end emergency rule in December 2007. In ending the emergency rule, Musharraf still did not reinstate Chaudhry and the other judges who had refused to take oath under the PCO arrangements. These judges had persistently protested and did so until Musharraf resigned in August 2008.

=== List of prominent judges removed ===
- Chief justice Iftikhar Muhammad Chaudhry
- Justice Rana Bhagwandas
- Justice Khalil-ur-Rehman Ramday
- Justice Javaid Iqbal
- Justice Raja Muhammad Fayyaz Ahmad
- Justice Mian Shakirullah Jan
- Justice Chaudhry Ijaz Ahmed
- Justice Khawaja Muhammad Sharif
- Justice Mahmood Akhtar Shahid Siddiqui
- Justice Ghulam Rabbani
- Justice Sardar Muhammad Raza

=== Movement activists put under house arrest ===
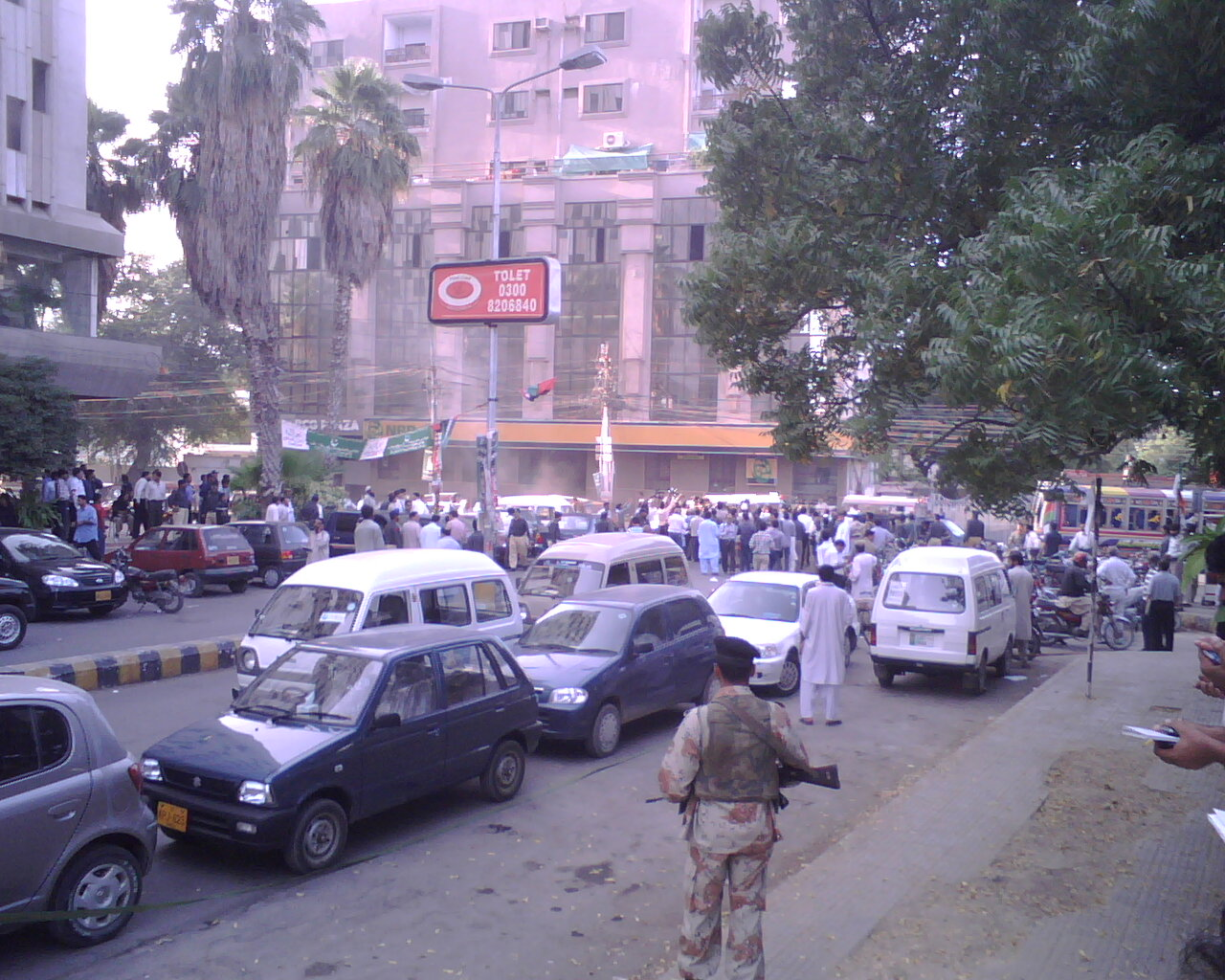
Policemen look on as lawyers gather in a pro-judiciary protest outside the Karachi Press Club on 5 November 2007.

On 4 November 2007, prominent leaders of the movement were kept under house arrest including former chief justice Iftikhar Chaudhry, Aitzaz Ahsan and Munir A. Malik. Such were the restrictions imposed on the judges under arrest that Malik later developed serious health problems due to his confinement when his kidneys shut down and his liver malfunctioned.

Amongst the various lawyers, opposition politicians and human rights activists put under house arrest was the UN special rapporteur Asma Jahangir. She was placed under house arrest on 5 November 2007. An email from Jahangir's house arrest was published in The Independent, in which she regretted that Musharraf had "lost his marbles".

=== Nationwide crackdown on lawyers ===
On 5 November 2007, police raided the Lahore High Court Bar Association. They baton-charged and threw tear gas into the premises and arrested over 800 lawyers. The Lahore High Court condemned the attack saying that never had it occurred in the history of Pakistan that armoured police vehicles entered a court's premises to attack protesting lawyers who had sought refuge within the court building. The protesting lawyers had earlier showered rose petals in front of the locked courtrooms of the judges who refused to take the oath under the PCO.

At the Sindh High Court (SHC) in Karachi, several protesting lawyers were arrested at the court premises. When removed judges tried to enter the court premises, they were stopped by police outside the gates. Over 45 protesting lawyers were picked up from the SHC premises including former FSC judge Shafi Mohammadi, relieved SHC chief justice Sabihuddin Ahmed's son Salahuddin Ahmed, justice Anwar Zaheer Jamali's son Najeeb Jamali, senior lawyer Fakhruddin G. Ebrahim's son Zahid Ebrahim and the son in law of Khawaja Muhammad Sharif, Azhar Hameed.

=== 2008 general elections and the Bhurban Accord ===
The 2008 general elections were held on 18 February 2008, after being postponed from 8 January 2008. The PPP and the Pakistan Muslim League (N) (PML-N) won the largest and second largest number of seats respectively in the national assembly. After the general elections, PPP and PML-N agreed to form a coalition government and Asif Ali Zardari and Nawaz Sharif, the chiefs of both PPP and PML-N respectively, joined together to organise a movement to impeach Pervez Musharraf.

The two leaders met at Pearl Continental Bhurban in Murree on 8 March 2008 where they signed a mutual political agreement called the Bhurban Accord. According to this political agreement, the two leaders agreed to restore the judiciary by 30 April 2008 and reinstate the 60 judges previously sacked by Musharraf. However, when the PPP came into government, Zardari took a less stringent stance than Sharif on the issue of the reinstatement of judges.

=== Zardari's reluctance to reinstate judges ===
The deposition of judges on November 3 had played in Zardari's favour. Just before the emergency rule was imposed, the Supreme Court had begun deliberations on the legality of Musharraf's US-backed proposal — the National Reconciliation Ordinance (NRO) — which had sought to drop corruption charges against Benazir Bhutto and Zardari in return for a joint Bhutto–Musharraf coalition to govern Pakistan. Where Bhutto and Zardari sympathised with Musharraf on his feud with the Supreme Court, they simultaneously criticised the imposition of martial law or a military dictatorship. As soon as the Supreme Court could issue a decision, Musharraf had replaced its members with his supporters.

After the 2008 elections, a Bhutto–Musharraf coalition seemed highly unlikely and Zardari felt political pressure from his peers to reinstate the judges. Zardari had feared that by reinstating the judges to their earlier posts, he would welcome cases against him in light of the Supreme Court's earlier deliberations on the legality of the NRO. Even after Musharraf resigned office in August 2008 and Zardari sworn in as the new president, he was reluctant to reinstate the judges immediately. This eventually led the lawyers to openly criticise the PPP-led government along with its PML-N allies and considered "them [both] a part of the same regime", since both had faltered over their agreement in the Bhurban Accord. These developments gave further traction to the original Adliya Bachao Movement. The stalwarts of the original movement reshaped their movement around the changing circumstances and called this rekindling of the movement as the "Lawyers' Movement".

=== The movement splits into camps ===
With Zardari's reluctance to reinstate Chaudhry and his later decision in February 2009 to declare president's rule in Punjab, the Lawyers' Movement broke into two separate camps – the first camp led by Hamid Khan held a pro-judiciary stance, while the other camp held a rather pro-government stance. Although there were some that didn't side with any particular camp at a given time.

Much like its predecessor movement Adliya Bachao Tehreek, both the camps in the Lawyers' Movement lobbied for the reinstatement of the sacked judges but differed on political grounds and the policies of their affiliated parties. The movement gained momentum as protests raged throughout Pakistan, particularly in Punjab under the encouragement of deposed representatives of the province. Former prime minister and PML-N chief Nawaz Sharif called for the reinstatement of Chaudhry helping this renewed struggle gain some leverage.

=== Petition ===
On 21 January 2009 the Lahore High Court Bar Association carried out a 10 Million signature movement. As the name suggests, the purpose of the movement was to get 10 million signatures on a large white cloth which was to be presented to the parliament at the end of long march. Political party workers, concerned citizen and lawyers participated and signed the petition.

=== Pakistan Long March ===
On 16 March 2009 the Lawyers' Community had given a call for nationwide 'Long March'. Many political parties like the Pakistan Muslim League (Nawaz Group), Pakistan Tehreek-e-Insaf, Jamaat-e-Islami and others supported and participated in the Long March. The march was from Karachi to Islamabad to demand the reinstatement of a Supreme Court Chief Justice and other judges ousted from office by former President Pervez Musharraf. Supporters of the 'restoration of judges' participated in the Long March despite a ban imposed on protests and rallies under Section 144 by the government.

=== Eventual restoration of the judiciary ===
As a result of the Lawyer's Movement, Zardari was forced to meet their demands and Chaudry was reinstated as the chief justice by prime minister Yousaf Raza Gillani on 17 March 2009.

== Prominent leaders of the movement ==
=== Original stalwarts ===
These activists were responsible for organising the 2007 Adliya Bachao Tehreek which paved the way for the later Lawyers' Movement.

- Ali Ahmad Kurd was a strong opponent of Musharraf's military regime and challenged the former army chief's eligibility as a candidate for the 2008 presidential elections.
- Aitzaz Ahsan wrote a poem while under house arrest which became the anthem of the Lawyers' Movement. Ahsan faced severe pressures being a member of the PPP's central executive committee, yet he greatly contributed to the movement setting aside his party's political aspirations.
- Munir A. Malik was decorated with a number of awards for his role in the Lawyers' Movement including the Dorab Patel Rule of Law Award by the Human Rights Commission of Pakistan (HRCP), the Human Rights Defender Award by the Asian Human Rights Commission (AHRC) shared with Aitzaz Ahsan and the 2008 Gwangju Prize for Human Rights.

=== Pro-judiciary camp ===
Certain decisions made by the PPP-led government showed resentment on various decisions of the Supreme Court. It was this contest between the government and the judiciary that made various members of the Lawyers' Movement side with a more pro-judiciary stance. The members who remained resolute against the PPP-led government for the restoration of judiciary in accordance with the Bhurban Accord were mostly led by Hamid Khan.

- Hamid Khan and vice-president of PTI.
- Tariq Mahmood served as a judge with the Balochistan High Court and refused to take oath under Musharraf's presidency. He was arrested and detained with his family during the emergency rule.
- Athar Minallah resigned his distinguished civil services career to join the Lawyers' Movement. He served as a minister in the North-West Frontier Province caretaker government under Musharraf's regime. After Musharraf suspended Chaudhry, he switched over sides and joined other lawyers in support of Chaudhry's reinstatement.
- Asrar-ul-Haq Mian was an executive chairman of the Pakistan Bar Council, Being a senior advocate of the Supreme Court, his role was pivotal in the Lawyers' Movement. He later supported Aitzaz Ahsan's camp backing Tariq Javed Chaudhry's nomination in the Lahore Bar Association election against Latif Khosa.
- Naseer Ahmed Bhutta as a PML-N MNA was vital in gaining the support of his party in joining the Lawyers' Movement to unite against Musharraf's unconstitutional suspension of the judges. He served as a leading figurehead of the PML-N and held his party's determination in reinstate the November 2 judiciary.
- Mian Muhammad Aslam played an active role in the Lawyers' Movement.
- Anwar Kamal Khan was a former PML-N senator who lobbied the Lawyers' Movement cause in the NWFP provincial assembly where he suggested to "line up a united opposition against the military dictator [Pervez Musharraf]". He also famously called Benazir Bhutto a "spent bullet for Pervez Musharraf".
- Rana Asadullah Khan was Secretary of Lahore High Court Bar Association at that time and he managed three famous long marches. He also started campaign of ten million signature petition to the Parliament for restoration of True Judiciary.His father was also a renowned lawyer Rana Abdul Rahim Khan. He struggled against Ayub Khan dictatorship when he was Secretary of Lahore High Court Bar Association in 1968.His elder brother Rana Mashhood Ahmad Khan was also Secretary of High Court Bar, Lahore. The only distinction this family enjoys that father and his two sons served as Secretary of Bar.

=== Civil Society ===
The following individuals were from the Civil Society were recognized at the final flag raising ceremony for their contribution to the movement:

- PPP Senator Safdar Ali Abbasi,
- Talat Hussain, journalist
- Hamid Mir, TV show host
- Mazhar Abbas, president of the Pakistan Federal Union of Journalist and
- Asma Shirazi, prominent TV anchor.

=== Pro-government camp ===
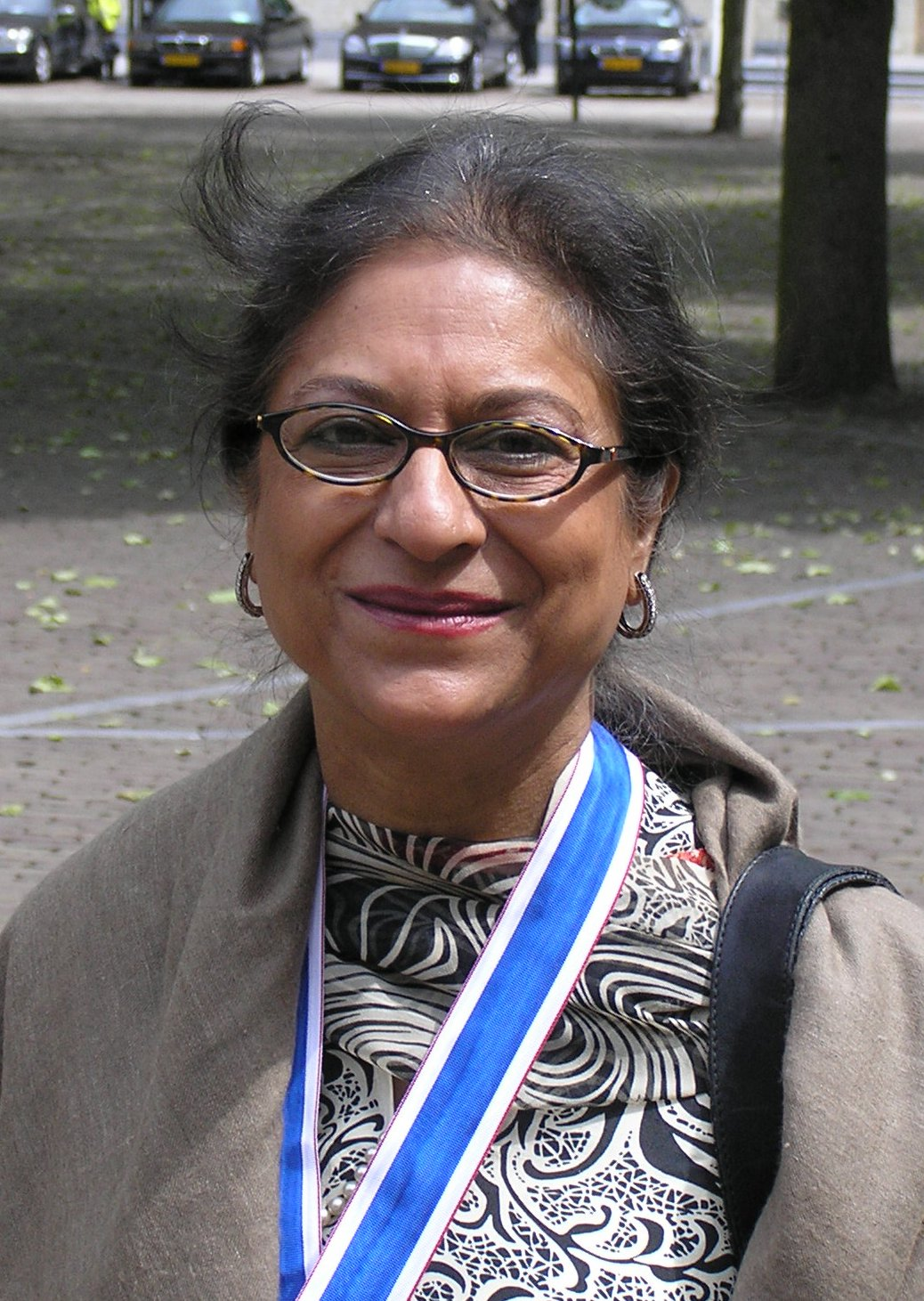
The UN special rapporteur Asma Jahangir served a pivotal role in the Lawyers' Movement and was put under house arrest on 5 November 2007.

These group of Lawyers' Movement activists sided with the PPP government after Zardari didn't reinstate the judges after he was sworn as the president of Pakistan.

- Latif Khosa was instrumental in the Lawyers’ Movement and voiced his appeal to restore dozens of senior judges sacked by Musharraf in 2007. He later distanced himself from the movement when the PML-N joined the movement against PPP, the political party that Khosa was affiliated with. He later organised a pro-government camp within the Lawyers' Movement.
- Latif Afridi was the general secretary of the Awami National Party (ANP) and later its breakaway faction National Awami Party of Pakistan (NAPP). He garnered support from both ANP and NAPP in backing the Lawyers' Movement.
- Asma Jahangir
- Qazi Anwar
- Muhammad Yasin Azad

== Various actors in the movement ==
=== Pakistani media ===
The print and electronic media were very active in the Lawyers' Movement. Geo News even had to face a ban.

Days before the call for 16 March 2009 Long March, Geo News carried out a series of public service message campaign which was sponsored by Mir Khalil ur Rehman Foundation (MKRF) for restoration of the judges. One of the campaign's message was an 8 minutes 12 Seconds video which showed all the promises and statements, especially by Pakistan Peoples Party leaders, about the restoration of the judges but were not fulfilled. The campaign proved very successful in educating people and reminding the government of their commitments. The government even blocked Geo News in many parts of the country as the government believed the campaign was biased.

Critics say that Print and electronic media, at times, crossed their limits of authority and helped creating a negative sentiment about the government among masses regarding the Chief Justice issue. However, the Lawyers movement succeeded in getting the interest of commons. Television channels covered the rallies of Judges for hours continuously.

=== Political parties ===
Pakistan Peoples Party (PPP), Pakistan Muslim League (N) (PMLN), Awaam Pakistan (AP), Awami National Party, Jamaat-e-Islami, Pakhtunkhwa Milli Awami Party, and Pakistan Tehreek-e-Insaf (PTI) supported the Lawyers' Movement on different occasions.

== In popular culture ==
- The music video for Shehzad Roy's 2008 song Laga Reh takes a satirical look at the Lawyers' Movement and depicts a protesting lawyer trying to light a matchstick in order to set ablaze a tyre as riots continue in the background. Later when the judiciary was restored after the Lawyers' Movement, Roy depicted corruption in the nation's judiciary and media in Apne Uloo, his 2011 song featuring Wasu.
- The music video for Ali Azmat's 2011 song Bum Phatta criticised the media circus that surrounded the ousting of Musharraf and the Lawyers' Movement, when it should instead be focused on pressing matters like poverty, education and terrorism.

== See also ==
- Suspension of Iftikhar Muhammad Chaudhry

== Citations ==
=== References ===
- Kalhan, Anil (2010). Ramraj, Victor; Thiruvengadam, Arun (eds.). "Constitution and 'Extraconstitution': Emergency Powers in Postcolonial Pakistan and India". Emergency Powers in Asia. Cambridge University Press. SSRN 1398545.
- Kalhan, Anil (2013). "'Gray Zone' Constitutionalism and the Dilemma of Judicial Independence in Pakistan". Vanderbilt Journal of Transnational Law. 46 (1): 1–96. SSRN 2087116.
- Note (2010). "The Pakistani Lawyers' Movement and the Popular Currency of Judicial Power". Harvard Law Review. 123 (7): 1705–1726.
- Malik, Munir (21 August 2009). The Pakistan Lawyers' Movement: An unfinished agenda (eBook). Barnes & Noble.
- Lieven, Anatol (2011). Pakistan: A Hard Country. New York City: Penguin Group. ISBN 978-0141038247.
- Tanveer, Rana (3 November 2008). "A chronology of the lawyers' movement". Daily Times. Archived from the original on 2014-07-15.
- Ayaz, Baber (February 2008). "A 'defining year': Munir Malik shares thoughts on Pakistan's judiciary, politics and democracy movement". Ethics in Action. 2 (1).
- longmarch.restore-pakistan-judiciary.org
