= Freedom of the press in Pakistan =

Constitutionally provided right

Freedom of the press in Pakistan is legally protected by the law of Pakistan as stated in its constitutional amendments, while the sovereignty, national integrity, and moral principles are generally protected by the specified media law, Freedom of Information Ordinance 2002, and Code of Conduct Rules 2010. In Pakistan, the code of conduct and ordinance act comprises a set of rules for publishing, distributing, and circulating news stories and operating media organizations working independently or running in the country.

The law of Pakistan (in media) maintains a hybrid legal system for independent journalism, while it prohibits media bias or misleading information under certain constitutional amendments as described by the country's constitution. Media crime which is described by the country's criminal codes is recognized as an unlawful act.

Nevertheless, freedom of the press in Pakistan is subject to certain restrictions, such as defamation law, a lack of protection for whistleblowers, barriers to information access, and constraints caused by public and government hostility to journalists. The press, including print, television, radio, and internet are amended to express their concerns under the selected provisions such as PEMRA Ordinance 2002, Defamation Ordinance 2002, Broadcasting Corporation Act, 1973, and Code of Conduct for Media Broadcasters/Cable TV Operators. The Protection of Journalists Act, of 2014 allows a journalist or media industry to cover any story and brought it to the audiences without impacting the national security of the country.

To protect the intellectual, moral, and fundamental rights of the citizens, the government has taken several countermeasures to combat circulating fake news and restricting objectionable content across multiple platforms. The law of Pakistan prohibits spreading or publishing fake news through social or mass media, and could lead to the imprisonment of a journalist or a newspaper ban.

Journalists accuse the military and security agencies of suppressing negative publicity.

== Global ranking ==
In 2025, Pakistan was ranked 158th out of 180 countries in the Press Freedom Index. In a report published by Reporters Without Borders (RWB), and is considered one of the deadliest countries in the world for journalists. It has a slight decline from 142nd position in 2019. The country's downward trend in the global ranking has been due to a combination of factors, including the killings of journalists, increasing restrictions on media, withdrawal of government ads threats, legal harassment, violation of independent journalism, arbitrary detentions, abductions, and intimidation through frivolous lawsuits. At least 48 reporters have been killed over the past 17 years. Despite 699 cases were reported by Journalists in total, only 5 attackers have ever been brought to justice. Journalists in Pakistan are not only facing constant threats from militant groups but also from the state. In fact, the new proposals, like the "Pakistan Media Regulatory Authority" (PMRA), which especially regulated online media. In regions like Balochistan and Khyber Pakhtunkhwa, reporters are stuck between security forces and armed groups, forced to cover conflict while having little to no protection from either side.

Although private TV and radio stations exist in Pakistan, they work under tight constraints, especially when it comes to content from Indian or Afghan sources. The state-run PTV remains the only terrestrial broadcaster. The government regularly blocks access to online platforms or posts it considers blasphemous, anti-state, or critical of the military.

=== Reactions ===
Then Prime Minister of Pakistan in his speech during a visit to the United States criticized the report published by Reporters Without Borders citing that "curbs on press freedom in Pakistan was a joke". His remarks on the global annual report were subsequently criticized by the RWB.

== Censorship on press ==
The government of Pakistan is often argued for carrying self-censorship and detentions of journalists under single-issue politics. Sometimes, the only news that favors the regime is published by the local media, whilst news that covers the economic and political problems in the country, or criticisms of the regime faces threatening warnings from the state. The print and broadcasting media claimed to carry stories under political pressure during the Pakistan Tehreek-e-Insaf (PTI) government.

The Council of Pakistan Newspaper Editors, a nonprofit organization of Pakistan dedicated to safeguards of journalists and media outlets argued Pakistan's direct and self-censorship and state-sponsored hostility towards independent journalists working in the country. Around 2018 or 2019, seven journalists were killed while fifteen others were injured in different violences. Sixty journalists were allegedly charged under Anti-Terrorism Act. The government, however, cited the issue with the country's law and order. In 2019 or earlier, the administration, first time in the history of Pakistan temporarily banned a journalist for possessing the material unlawfully. The federal government-owned agency Pakistan Electronic Media Regulatory Authority (PEMRA), responsible for regulating and issuing channel licenses for establishment of the mass, print and electronic media, restricted some news presenters from participating in debates on Talk shows, and later the restrictions were lifted after sixty days.

In 2019, the government suspended news TV channels, including Channel 24, Abb Takk News, and Capital TV for broadcasting the opposition party's program on their channels. Reporters Without Borders criticized the action citing "brazen censorship". The government, however, suspended under a set of new laws for media regulators to attempt to restrict press conferences convicted or on-trial politicians. During the tenure of Imran Khan's PTI government, the state was criticised for "muffling" the press.

According to Dr. Seema Khan of Australian Institute of International Affairs, since the ouster of Imran Khan in 2022, a "media blackout" was put into effect, and Journalists who criticized the "brutal display of force" were targeted, abducted in broad daylight, or even subjected to enforced disappearances. For example, the renowned journalist Arshad Sharif, was forced to leave the country after his ARY News interview with Shahbaz Gill. He was charged with 16 felonies, including treason. He initially fled to Dubai before seeking refuge in Kenya where he was killed by the police under suspicious circumstances. His wife told the Committee to Protect Journalists that it was a targeted killing. Some Pakistani investigators described the killing of Arshad Sharif as a "planned assassination." Similarly, journalist Imran Riaz Khan, was abducted from police premises. According to his brother, "he was picked up" for speaking the truth. Moeed Pirzada, Ahmed Noorani, and Sabir Shakir too had to flee abroad.

On 4 January 2023, the Pakistan Telecommunications Authority (PTA) blocked Wikipedia for blasphemous content. The spokesperson from PTA told the press that it would remain blocked until it removes all the objectionable material. Pakistan also blocked YouTube from 2012 to 2016 for blasphemous content against Prophet Mohammed.

In May 2023, senior military officials summoned media leaders to a meeting in Islamabad, where they were instructed to avoid airing Imran's name and images. This directive was reinforced by Pakistan's media regulator. The media complied swiftly, with coverage of Imran's protests and rallies vanishing, and news outlets referring to him only as "Bani PTI" (leader of PTI). In one instance, after the directive was issued, Asad Umar, a former minister in Imran Khan's government, was invited to a current affairs show. Uncertain about the restrictions, he asked the anchor if his comments could be aired. During the first break, the anchor warned him, saying, "You'll get me killed, you've said Imran's name 17 times."

Dawn News had to face a financial crisis after the government choked off its advertising revenue by banning government advertisements, first for its printed papers in 2024, and then for its TV and radio outlets in 2025.

In January 2026, an anti terrorism court sentenced eight journalists and YouTubers to life over their digital activity in support of Imran Khan amid the 2023 Pakistani protests and May 9 riots. The Committee to Protect Journalists (CPJ) had stated in 2023 that the investigations constituted retaliation for critical reporting and its Asia programme coordinator called on authorities to drop the cases and end intimidation and censorship of the media.

Munizae Jahangir, a journalist and co-chair for the HRCP, stated that editors told her to not cover certain stories. Later in 2026, she was removed from her weekly programme, Spot Light for Aaj News, without any explanation. It was perceived that her last episode, where she questioned PM Shehbaz Sharif's coordinator on government spending, might have been the reason. She described it as "an unforeseen reluctant end to this journey." Additionally, she told ThePrint, that reporting "straightforward facts" in Pakistan had become "increasingly fraught."

Azaz Syed, a reporter for Geo TV, stated that Pakistan's authorities had largely controlled the mainstream media and said that even stories indirectly linked to the military, including a report he did on Defence Housing Authority, had prompted phone calls from unknown numbers threatening him not to pursue the matter further.

According to BBC News, some anonymous journalists have claimed that a "culture of self-censorship" became common in newsrooms. Many journalists have also claimed that the environment for reporters became more difficult after the 2016 Prevention of Electronic Crimes Act (PECA) was amended in early 2025. Pakistan's Joint Action Committee had earlier stated that the aim was to criminalize "dissenting opinions."

In June 2026, Geo TV was taken off-air and the channel was suspended for 15 days at the instructions of PEMRA for airing a program "Safar-e-Ishq" on Muharram which featured "religious visualisations" and customs from countries like Iraq. PEMRA termed it a "serious regulatory concern" and stated that the documentary "was liable to hurt the religious sentiments of viewers" and "create a risk of disturbance to public peace." The channel had to issue an apology.

In August 2026, multiple internet users across Pakistan claimed they were unable to access Al Jazeera's English-language website after the network aired extensive reporting on the protests in Pakistan-administered Kashmir amid legislative elections. On 2 August, Pakistan's Ministry of Information and Broadcasting accused the media house of "selective reporting" and accused it of "misrepresenting" the elections but neither the authorities nor the ministry officially confirmed the ban. It remained inaccessible without VPN.

=== Violence against Journalists ===
According to the CPJ, between 1992-2024, at least 64 journalists were killed in connection with their work in Pakistan.

==== Notable incidents ====
In June 2006, Hayatullah Khan was found shot dead in North Waziristan, six months after vanishing. He had earlier reported a US drone strike that killed a wanted al-Qaeda figure Hamza Rabia. His report had contradicted official Pakistani claims that the terrorist had died in a "bomb-making accident." He had disappeared days after photographing the shrapnel from a Hellfire missile. Khan had been handcuffed and shot once in the back. His brother was quoted by The New York Times blaming a "Pakistani intelligence agency."

In May 2024 alone, four journalists were killed. The same month, Syed Iqrar ul Hassan, an ARY News anchor, and his three team members were attacked by a group of people in Gujranwala.

=== 2025 Amendment to the Prevention of Electronic Crimes Act ===
In January 2025, the government introduced new laws mostly aimed at regulating social media content. The move was subject to anger and criticism among journalism groups and rights activists who said that it was aimed at curbing press freedom. As a result of this amendment, under Section 26A, fake news was now defined as any information about which a person "knows or has reason to believe to be false or fake and likely to cause or create a sense of fear, panic or disorder or unrest." Any person found guilty of spreading such information could be sentenced to up to three years in prison or fined up to PKR 2 million or more than $7000.

Pakistan Federal Union of Journalists (PFUJ) stated that the government had not consulted any journalistic bodies before introducing the law. The union's president said that he believed it was intended to gag freedom of speech and intimidate journalists and their media outlets.

Media stakeholders strongly opposed the ordinance in a joint statement issued by representatives of PFUJ, All Pakistan Newspapers Society (APNS), Council of Pakistan Newspapers Editors (CPNE), Pakistan Broadcasters Association (PBA), and Association of Electronic Media Editors and News Directors (AEMEND) warning that the proposed bill could become another tool to target journalists, political activists, human rights defenders, and dissenting voices by "criminalising criticism of state institutions." Journalists across the country held a "black day" on 31 January, organised by leading media organisations. Black armbands were worn to symbolise the protest.

There were multiple lawsuits against PECA.

According to a senate report addressing misuse of the law, a total of 689 FIRs had already been registered by August 2025, including nine against journalists.

=== Foreign Media Facilitation Guidelines 2026 ===
In August 2026, new rules were introduced under the "Foreign Media Facilitation Guidelines 2026." The rules facilitated severe new restrictions on international media, including barring them from reporting in most of Pakistan. It was made mandatory for every journalist to seek permission before reporting from anywhere within the country except Islamabad, Karachi and Lahore. The new rules also stated that journalists could lose their accreditation for "acts against ideology, sovereignty, security or public order of Pakistan." Legal experts called these stipulations "vague and difficult to interpret."

Journalists were now required to register with the government’s external media wing and obtain a No Objection Certificate (NOC) before reporting outside the three cities. However, no time-frame was provided for approval.

Earlier, Faiza Murad, a London-based PTI leader, had already hinted that Pakistan's I&B ministry would tighten reporting requirements for foreign journalists. Nasir Zaidi, former general secretary at the PFUJ, called the situation "worse than martial law" and accused the government of silencing international media over their objective reporting on protest movements, crackdowns on opposition parties and the "repressive political situation." Human Rights Watch's senior associate Asia director called the restrictions an "alarming step in the country's narrowing space for press freedom." Human Rights Commission of Pakistan (HRCP) expressed concern that the guidelines would "institutionalise bureaucratic control over news gathering" and risk deterring independent reporting.
