= Javaid Rehman =

British-Pakistani legal scholar and professor

United Nations Special Rapporteur for Human Rights in Iran
- In office 13 July 2018 – 31 July 2024
- Preceded by: Asma Jahangir
- Succeeded by: Mai Sato

Personal details
- Born: Faisalabad, Punjab, Pakistan
- Education: Government College, Lahore; University of the Punjab; University of Reading; University of Hull

Javaid Rehman (Urdu: جاوید رحمان) is a British-Pakistani legal scholar and Professor of Islamic Law and International Law at Brunel University London.

== Special Rapporteur on human rights in Iran ==
On 7 July 2018, Rehman was appointed as the United Nations Special Rapporteur on the human rights situation in the Islamic Republic of Iran, officially commencing his duties on 13 July.

On 6 August 2018 he first wrote to the Iranian Government expressing his interest in visiting Iran. He said he had already received a number of reports raising concerns about alleged violations of human rights in the country. His requests were consistently refused.

Rehman stepped down on 31 July 2024 after holding the mandate for the maximum six years allowed in the role.

== Works ==
- Book written in the name and title of Indigenous Peoples and Ethnic Minorities of Pakistan: Constitutional and Legal Perspectives (2013) ISBN 9781136778681

== See also ==
- Asma Jahangir
- Human Rights Commission of Pakistan
- Hina Jilani
