= United Nations Special Rapporteur on Human Rights in Iran =

United Nations Special Rapporteur

- Emblem of the United Nations
- Incumbent; Mai Sato since July 2024
- Inaugural holder: Andrés Aguilar Mawdsley
- Website: www.ohchr.org/en/special-procedures/sr-iran

The United Nations Special Rapporteur on the situation of human rights in the Islamic Republic of Iran is a United Nations Special Rapporteur whose mandate is to monitor and investigate human rights violations in Iran. The current Special Rapporteur is Mai Sato. She is the seventh special rapporteur to Iran, following the tenures of Andrés Aguilar (1984–1986), Reynaldo Galindo Pohl (1986–1995), Maurice Copithorne (1995–2002), Ahmed Shaheed (2011–2016), Asma Jilani Jahangir (2016–2018) and Javaid Rehman (2018−2024).

== Tenures ==
=== Andrés Aguilar (1984–1986) ===
In 1984, the United Nations Commission on Human Rights (UNCHR) appointed Andrés Aguilar of Venezuela as its Special Representative to Iran on human rights. Iran refused to engage with him and he "eventually resigned, unable to persuade Iranian officials to cooperate with him in any way."

=== Reynaldo Galindo Pohl (1986–1995) ===
Galindo Pohl, a prominent diplomat and professor of law from El Salvador, served as the Special Representative from 1986 to 1995. He visited Iran three times between 1990 and 1992, but after his third visit, he was barred from visiting Iran.

=== Maurice Copithorne (1995–2002) ===
Following the resignation of Galindo Pohl, the UNCHR appointed Maurice Copithorne, a Canadian lawyer, as the Special Rapporteur. On 22 April 2002, the UNCHR voted not to renew the mandate of the Special Rapporteur, a decision condemned by Human Rights Watch (HRW) and the U.S. Commission on International Religious Freedom (USCIRF).

=== Ahmed Shaheed (2011–2016) ===
In March 2011, the UN Human Rights Council re-established this mandate, which the UNCHR had terminated in 2002, under the title Special Rapporteur on the situation of human rights in the Islamic Republic of Iran. Ahmed Shaheed was the Special Rapporteur from 2011 to 2016. He went on to become the UN Special Rapporteur on Freedom of Religion or Belief. He was twice Foreign Minister of the Maldives from 2005 to 2007 and 2008 to 2010.

=== Asma Jahangir (2016–2018) ===
Asma Jilani Jahangir was selected as the Special Rapporteur in 2016. She was a human rights lawyer of Pakistani origin and a former President of the Supreme Court Bar Association of Pakistan. She suffered from cardiac arrest in Lahore on 11 February 2018 and later died at the hospital.

=== Javaid Rehman (2018–2024) ===
On 7 July 2018, Javaid Rehman was appointed as the United Nations Special Rapporteur on the human rights situation in the Islamic Republic of Iran.

=== Mai Sato (2024–) ===
In its 56th session on 12 July 2024, the United Nations Human Rights Council appointed Mai Sato, a Japanese academic, as the new special rapporteur of this international body on Iran.

== List ==
#	Rapporteur	Nationality	Years
1	Andrés Aguilar	Venezuela	1984–1986
2	Reynaldo Galindo Pohl	El Salvador	1986–1995
3	Maurice Copithorne	Canada	1995–2002
—N/a			2002–2011
4	Ahmed Shaheed	Maldives	2011–2016
5	Asma Jahangir	Pakistan	2016–2018
6	Javaid Rehman	Pakistan	2018–2024
7	Mai Sato	Japan	2024–

== See also ==
- High Council for Human Rights Iran
- Asma Jahangir Pakistan
- Human Rights Commission of Pakistan
