= Freedom of Information Act =

Freedom of Information Act (FOIA) may refer to the following legislations in different jurisdictions which mandate the national government to disclose certain data to the general public upon request:

- Freedom of Information Act (United States) of 1966
- Freedom of Information Act 1982, the Australian act
- Freedom of Information Act 2000, the UK act
- Freedom of Information (Scotland) Act 2002
- Freedom of Information Act in Pakistan
- Freedom of Information Act (Illinois)

== See also ==
- Freedom of information laws by country
