= Nadeem Malik =

Nadeem Malik may refer to:

- Nadeem Malik (journalist) (born 1968), Pakistani journalist
- Nadeem Malik (cricketer) (born 1982), English cricketer
