= Naeem Sabir Jamaldini =

Pakistani human rights activist

Assassination of Naeem Sabir
- Location: Khuzdar district, Balochistan, Pakistan
- Date: 1 March 2011
- Attack type: Assassination, targeted killing
- Deaths: 1
- Victim: Naeem Sabir (human rights activist)
- Perpetrator: Armed group "Baloch Musla Defai Tanzee" (allegedly working at the behest of Pakistani intelligence agencies)
- Verdict: Perpetrators not officially convicted

Naeem Sabir, also known as Naeem Sabir Jamaldini, was a prominent Pakistani social worker and human rights activist in Khuzdar, Balochistan. He had been associated with the Human Rights Commission of Pakistan (HRCP) since 1997 and had been working to promote human rights in the district. In the recent past, he had been helping the Commission in documenting the cases of enforced disappearances of students, lawyers, political activists and other citizens and the subsequent recovery of their bullet-ridden, mutilated bodies in desolate places in the province.

Sabir was shot dead by armed motorcyclists in Khuzdar district on Tuesday, 1 March 2011. An armed group called Baloch Musla Defai Tanzee, which is believed to be working at the behest of intelligence agencies of Pakistan to thwart a snowballing insurgency in the oil and gas rich province, claimed responsibility for the assassination. Sabir was survived by a bereaved widow and a less than 2-year-old child.

The assassination was condemned by the HRCP, which issued a statement "The assassins of Federal Minister for Minority Affairs Shahbaz Bhatti and Mr Naeem Sabir, HRCP coordinator in Khuzdar district, may perhaps belong to different groups but they represent the militant hardliners who are out to obliterate the rights of the non-Muslim citizens of Pakistan and eliminate the human rights defenders who raise their voice against persecution on any ground. HRCP expresses its sense of outrage and deep grief at the foul murders."
