= Mai Sato =

Japanese academic and UN Special Rapporteur

United Nations Special Rapporteur on Human Rights in Iran
- Incumbent
- Assumed office July 2024
- Preceded by: Javaid Rehman

Personal details
- Born: Tokyo
- Education: King's College London; Academic appointments: Australian National University; Monash University; Birkbeck, London

Mai Sato (佐藤舞, Satō Mai) is a Japanese born academic with an interest in international human rights law and the death penalty. In 2024, she was appointed the United Nations Special Rapporteur on human rights in Iran.

== Life and career ==
Sato was born and grew up in Tokyo. She studied social sciences in the United Kingdom, receiving a PhD from King's College London in 2011, and working at the Universities of Reading and Oxford. Moving to Australia in February 2019, she was an associate professor at the Australian National University and then Monash University.

Her principal focus has been on the death penalty and has worked on projects on the death penalty in Asia and Africa. She has also established and helps run CrimeInfo, an NGO which promotes the abolition of capital punishment in Japan and has made a documentary film on this subject.

In July 2024, Sato was appointed the United Nations Special Rapporteur on human rights in Iran, commencing her duties on 1 August 2024. The appointment was for a three-year term, that can be extended. The number of executions in Iran is among the highest in the world, which relates the appointment to Sato's area of expertise.

In addition, she was appointed Professor and Director of the Institute for Crime and Justice Policy Research at Birkbeck, University of London from February 2025.

According to an interview published in Médialatitudes, Sato stated that “any country that is currently carrying out executions, including Iran, is doing so primarily for retributive reasons or as a tool of social control,” reflecting her view on the use of the death penalty in the context of human rights concerns.

In January 2026, Sato called for an independent investigation to determine whether the Iranian government’s suppression of nationwide protests constitutes crimes against humanity.
