= Asma Jahangir =

Pakistani human rights activist and lawyer

Asma Jahangir NI HI
- عاصمہ جہانگیر
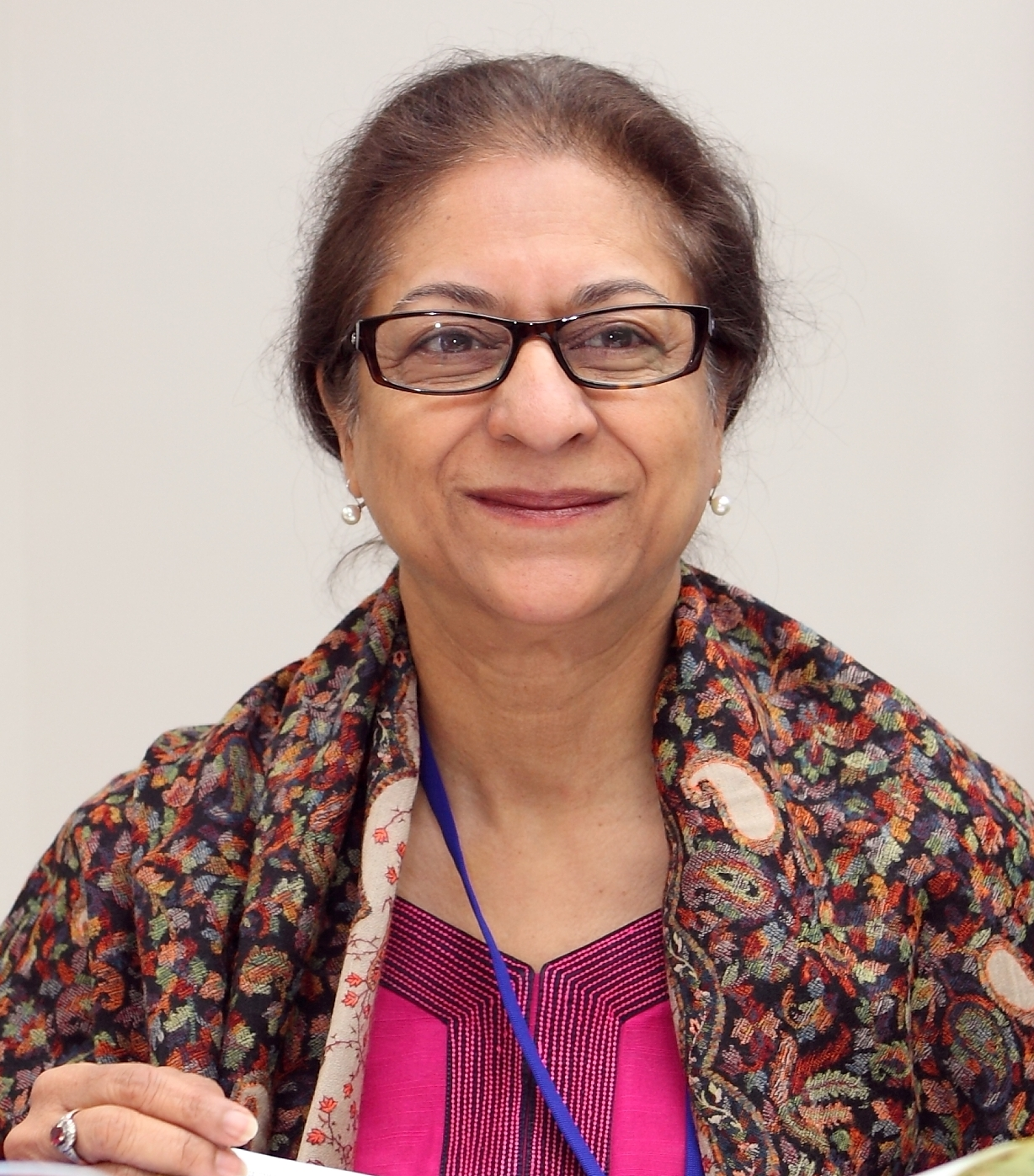
- Jahangir in 2013

United Nations Special Rapporteur for Human Rights in Iran United Nations Special Rapporteur on Extrajudicial, Summary or Arbitrary Executions United Nations Special Rapporteur on the Freedom of Religion or Belief
- In office 1 November 2016 – 11 February 2018
- Preceded by: Ahmed Shaheed
- Succeeded by: Javaid Rehman

President of Supreme Court Bar Association of Pakistan
- In office 27 October 2010 – 31 October 2011
- Preceded by: Qazi Anwar
- Succeeded by: Rasheed A Rizvi

Head of Human Rights Commission of Pakistan
- In office 1987–2011
- Preceded by: Position established
- Succeeded by: Zohra Yusuf

Personal details
- Born: Asma Jilani; 27 January 1952 Lahore, West Punjab, Pakistan
- Died: 11 February 2018 (aged 66) Lahore, Punjab, Pakistan
- Cause of death: Brain hemorrhage
- Spouse: Tahir Jahangir
- Children: 3, including Munizae
- Relatives: Hina Jilani (sister)
- Education: Punjab University (LL.B.); Kinnaird College (BA)
- Profession: Lawyer, Human Rights Activist
- Awards: Nishan-e-Imtiaz (2018) (Posthumously); Right Livelihood Award, United Nations Prize in the Field of Human Rights (2018); Right Livelihood Award (2016); Légion d'Honneur (2014); Stefanus Prize (2014); North-South Prize of the Council of Europe (2012); Four Freedoms Award (2010); Hilal-i-Imtiaz (2010); Ramon Magsaysay Award (2005); Leo Eitinger Award (2002); Martin Ennals Award (1995)

Asma Jilani Jahangir (Urdu: عاصمہ جہانگیر, romanized: ʿĀṣimah Jahāṉgīr; 27 January 1952 – 11 February 2018) was a Pakistani human rights lawyer and social activist who co-founded and chaired the Human Rights Commission of Pakistan and AGHS Legal Aid Cell. Jahangir was known for playing a prominent role in the Lawyers' Movement and served as the United Nations Special Rapporteur on Freedom of Religion or Belief and as a trustee at the International Crisis Group.

Born and raised in Lahore, Jahangir studied at the Convent of Jesus and Mary before receiving her B.A. from Kinnaird and LLB from the Punjab University Law College in 1978 and joined the chamber of Barrister Ijaz Hussain Batalvi. In 1980, she was called to the Lahore High Court, and to the Supreme Court in 1982. In the 1980s, Jahangir became a democracy activist and was imprisoned in 1983 for participating in the Movement for the Restoration of Democracy against the military regime of Zia-ul-Haq. In 1986, she moved to Geneva, and became the vice-chair of the Defence for Children International and remained until 1988 when she returned to Pakistan.

In 1987, Jahangir co-founded the Human Rights Commission of Pakistan and became its Secretary-General. In 1993, she was elevated as the commission's chairperson. She was again put under house arrest in November 2007 after the imposition of emergency. After serving as one of the leaders of the Lawyers' Movement, she became Pakistan's first woman to serve as the President of Supreme Court Bar Association, she presided over a Seminar to pay homage to Barrister Ijaz Hussain Batalvi organised by Akhtar Aly Kureshy Convenier Ijaz Hussain Batalvi Foundation. She co-chaired South Asia Forum for Human Rights and was the vice president of International Federation for Human Rights. Jahangir served as the United Nations Special Rapporteur on Freedom of Religion from August 2004 to July 2010, including serving on the U.N. panel for inquiry into Sri Lankan human rights violations and on a United Nations fact-finding mission on Israeli settlements. In 2016, she was named as the United Nations Special Rapporteur on the Situation of Human Rights in Iran, remaining until her death in February 2018.

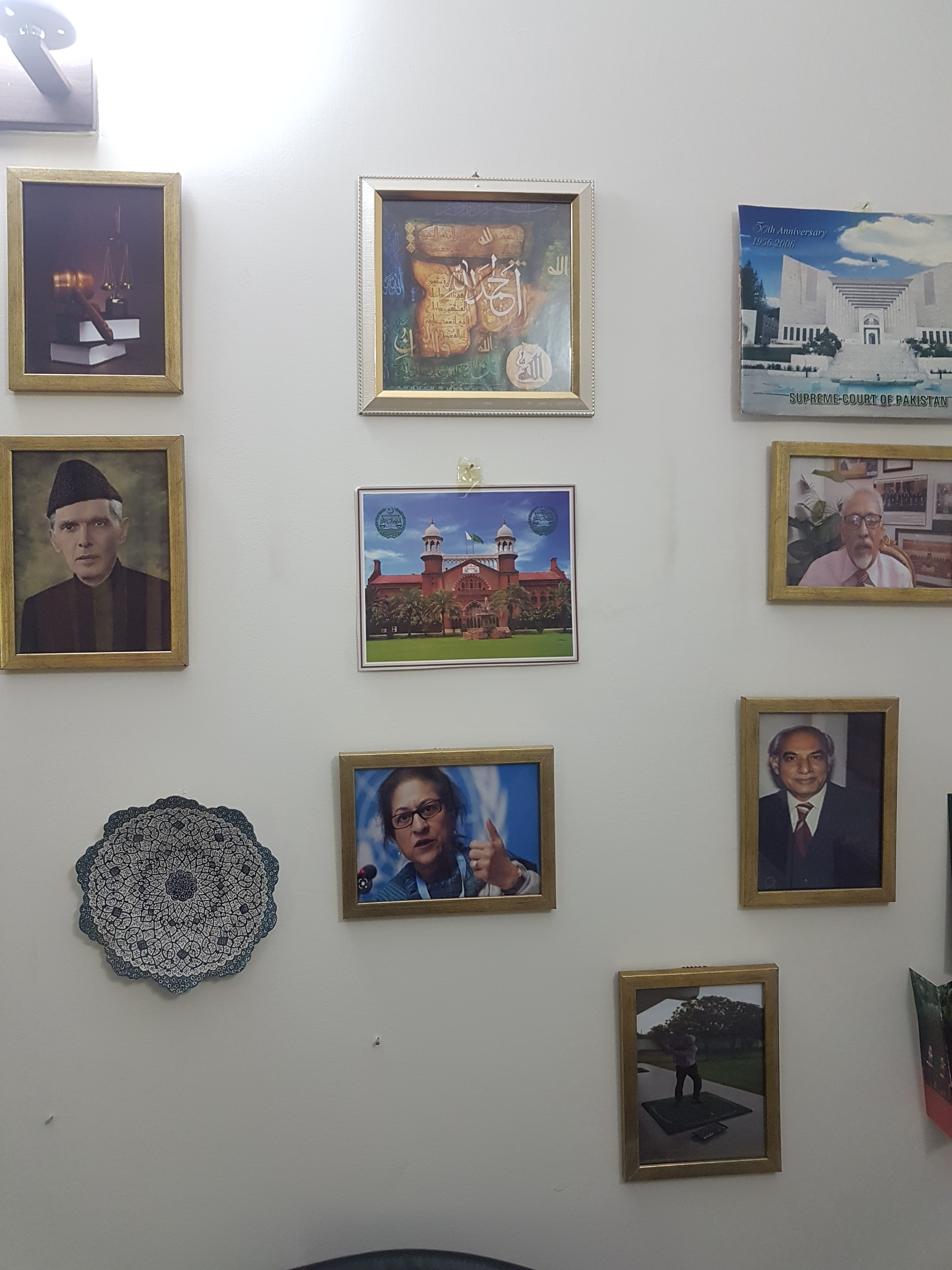
Picture of Asma Jahangir with picture of Ijaz Hussain Batalvi in shadow of Supreme Court of Pakistan and Lahore High Court.

Jahangir is the recipient of several awards including the 2014 Right Livelihood Award (along with Edward Snowden) for "defending, protecting and promoting human rights in Pakistan and more widely, often in very difficult and complex situations and at great personal risk", 2010 Freedom Award, Hilal-i-Imtiaz in 2010, Sitara-i-Imtiaz, Ramon Magsaysay Award in 2005, 1995 Martin Ennals Award for Human Rights Defenders, and the UNESCO/Bilbao Prize for the Promotion of a Culture of Human Rights. She was awarded a Legion of Honour by France, and in 2016 the University of Pennsylvania Law School awarded her an honorary degree. Her writings include The Hudood Ordinance: A Divine Sanction? and Children of a Lesser God.

Jahangir was posthumously awarded the Nishan-e-Imtiaz on 23 March 2018, the highest degree of service to the state, and for services to international diplomacy by Mamnoon Hussain.

== Early life and education ==
Asma Jahangir was born and raised in Lahore, Pakistan, into a prosperous and politically active Urdu-speaking Muhajir family of Kakazai Pashtun origins, with a history of activism and human rights work. Her father, Malik Ghulam Jilani, was a civil servant who entered politics upon retirement and spent years both in jail and under house arrest for opposing military dictatorships. Malik was imprisoned on several occasions for his outspoken views, which included denouncing the Pakistani government for genocide during their military action in what is now Bangladesh (formerly East Pakistan).

Her mother, Begum Sabiha Jilani (1927–2012), was educated at a co-ed college named Forman Christian College in Lahore, at a time when few Muslim women received higher education. Sabiha also fought the traditional system, pioneering her own clothing business until her family's lands were confiscated in 1967 as a result of her husband's opinions and detention. Sabiha was the daughter of Maulana Salahuddin Ahmed, a well-known Urdu writer.

Jahangir herself became involved at a young age in protests against the military regime as well as opposing her father's detention by then president, Benazir Bhutto's father, Zulfikar Ali Bhutto in 1972. She received her B.A. from Kinnaird College, Lahore and her Bachelor of Law degree (LLB) in 1978, from Punjab University Law College. She also held an honorary doctorate from University of St. Gallen in Switzerland, Queens University, Canada, Simon Fraser University, Canada and Cornell University, United States.

== Personal life ==
Asma Jilani married Tahir Jahangir, a member of business clan who owns Premier Group. He currently serves as the chairman of the Punjab Oil Mills. They had a son, Jillani Jahangir who runs the family business, and two daughters, Munizae Jahangir, a journalist and Sulema Jahangir, who is also a lawyer. Her family is one of the sponsor of the Punjab Oil Mills which sells cooking oil under brands, Canolive and Zaiqa. Her first grandchild is Natasha Asma Rouse who she doted on and took with her to court and all her bar meetings.

== Activism ==
She spent her career defending the human and women's rights, rights of religious minorities and children in Pakistan. Jahangir was a staunch critic of the Hudood Ordinance and blasphemy laws of Pakistan put in place as part of General Muhammad Zia-ul-Haq's Islamization program in Pakistan. She was a founding member of the Human Rights Commission of Pakistan, and served as Secretary-General and later Chairperson of the organisation.

In 1980, Jahangir and her sister, Hina Jilani, got together with fellow activists and lawyers to form the first law firm established by women in Pakistan. In the same year they also helped form the Women’s Action Forum (WAF), a pressure group campaigning against Pakistan's discriminatory legislation, most notably against the Proposed Law of Evidence, where the value of a woman's testimony was reduced to half that of a man's testimony, and the Hadood Ordinances, where victims of rape had to prove their innocence or else face punishment themselves. On 12 February 1983, the Punjab Women Lawyers Association in Lahore organised a public protest (one of its leaders was Jahangir) against the Proposed Law of Evidence, during which Jahangir and other participating WAF members were beaten, teargassed, and arrested by police.

The first WAF demonstration, however, took place in 1983 when some 25–50 women took to the streets protesting the controversial case of Safia Bibi. In 1983, Safia, a blind 13-year-old girl, was raped by her employers, and as a result became pregnant, yet ended up in jail charged with fornication (zina) sentenced to flogging, three years of imprisonment and fined. Jahangir defended Safia in her appeal and eventually the verdict was over-ruled by an appeals court due to pressure and protests. They would say: "We [their law firm] had been given a lot of cases by the advocate general and the moment this demonstration came to light, the cases were taken away from us." In 1982, Jahangir earned the nickname "little heroine" after leading a protest march in Islamabad against a decision by then-president Zia-ul-Haq to enforce religious laws and stated: "Family laws [which are religious laws] give women few rights" and that "They have to be reformed because Pakistan cannot live in isolation. We cannot remain shackled while other women progress".

In 1986, Jahangir and Hina set up AGHS Legal Aid Cell, the first free legal aid centre in Pakistan. The AGHS Legal Aid Cell in Lahore also runs a shelter for women, called 'Dastak', looked after by her secretary Munib Ahmed. She was also a proponent of protecting the rights of persecuted religious minorities in Pakistan and spoke out against forced conversions. Jahangir campaigned against human rights abuses taking place in government and police custody in Pakistan. In a letter to The New York Times, she said that "Women are arrested, raped and sexually assaulted every day in the presence of female constables, who find themselves helpless in such situations".

In 1996, the Lahore High Court ruled that an adult Muslim woman could not get married without the consent of her male guardian (wali). Women, who chose their husbands independently, could be forced to annul their marriages and the repercussions were highlighted by Jahangir, who also took on such cases (i.e. the case of Saima Waheed); "Hundreds have already been arrested. This is simply going to open up the floodgates for the harassment of women and girls by their families and the authorities. The courts have sanctioned their oppression. Thousands more are bound to be affected by this."

Jahangir demanded that the government of Pervez Musharraf work to improve the record of human rights domestically. Citing examples of human rights abuses, she wrote, "A Hindu income tax inspector gets lynched in the presence of the army personnel for allegedly having made a remark on the beard of a trader. Promptly, the unfortunate Hindu government servant is booked for having committed blasphemy, while the traders and the Lashkar-e-Taiba activists were offered tea over parleys. A seventy-year-old Mukhtaran Bibi and her pregnant daughter Samina are languishing in Sheikhupura jail on trumped-up charges of blasphemy".

"We never learnt the right lessons. We never went to the root of the problem. Once you start politicising religion, you play with fire and you get burnt as well."

— Asma

She was also an active opponent of child labour and capital punishment: "It would be hypocrisy to defend laws I don't believe in, like capital punishment, the blasphemy law and laws against women and in favor of child labor." Asma Jahangir served as the UN Special Rapporteur on Extrajudicial Executions from 1998 to 2004, and as the UN Special Rapporteur on Freedom of Religion and Belief from 2004 to 2010. In her capacity as a UN official, Jahangir was in Pakistan, when Pervez Musharraf declared a state of emergency in 2007. In November 2006, she participated the international meeting for The Yogyakarta Principles as one of 29 experts. On 5 November 2007, UN High Commissioner for Human Rights Louise Arbour indicated that Jahangir was among the judicial and political officials detained by the Musharraf government.

On 18 January 2017, Jahangir became the first Pakistani to deliver the 2017 Amartya Sen Lecture at the London School of Economics, where she called for a counter-narrative of liberal politics to challenge religious intolerance. She added that there was a "large scale impunity" among those who commit crimes in the name of religion, and this has to be addressed at the national as well as the international levels, the rights activist said. "In 1986, Pakistan got the blasphemy law. So, while we had just two cases of blasphemy before that year, now we have thousands. It shows that one should be careful while bringing religion into legislation, because the law itself can become an instrument of persecution," she added.

In August 2017, Jahangir represented the families of terror convicts sentenced to death by military tribunals before the Supreme Court in Said Zaman Khan v. Federation of Pakistan. Jahangir asked order retrial in all cases in which military courts handed down convictions, including capital punishments, but the Supreme Court unanimously upheld the sentence of the convicts on 29 August 2017.

Asma spoke against the five member Supreme Court judgment which deposed Nawaz Sharif from his premiership. She questioned why members of Inter-Services Intelligence and Military intelligence were inducted in Joint Investigation team ferreting out corruption by Sharif's family and his close companions. She questioned how the Panama case five judges would have felt if members of the ISI and MI were inducted in Supreme Judicial Council, a body authorised to punish erring judges. Earlier she had suggested that ousted prime minister would get no relief from Supreme Court but from coming on streets.

In December 2017, Jahangir called for a probe by a parliamentary committee to ascertain as to who was behind the recent Faizabad sit-in. She questioned "We need to know how the army became a guarantor during the agreement between the government and protesters. Why money was distributed among the protesters,".

In her last case before the Supreme Court, Jahangir appeared for former Member of the National Assembly Rai Hasan Nawaz in Sami Ullah Baloch v. Abdul Karim Nousherwani in February 2018. She argued that there should not be a constant period of electoral disqualification under Article 62(1)(f) of the Constitution, but courts should decide the question according to the conduct of individuals. She said the Supreme Court had held Nawaz Sharif eligible to contest elections in 2009 by deeming him sadiq and ameen, but now it was difficult to understand whether the court had increased the bar of honesty or reduced it.

=== House arrest ===
On 5 November 2007, The Economist reported that "Over 500 lawyers, opposition politicians and human rights activists have been arrested. They include Asma Jahangir, boss of the country's human-rights commission and a former UN special rapporteur. In an e-mail from her house arrest, where she has been placed for 90 days, Ms Jahangir regretted that General Musharraf had 'lost his marbles'".

== Public image ==
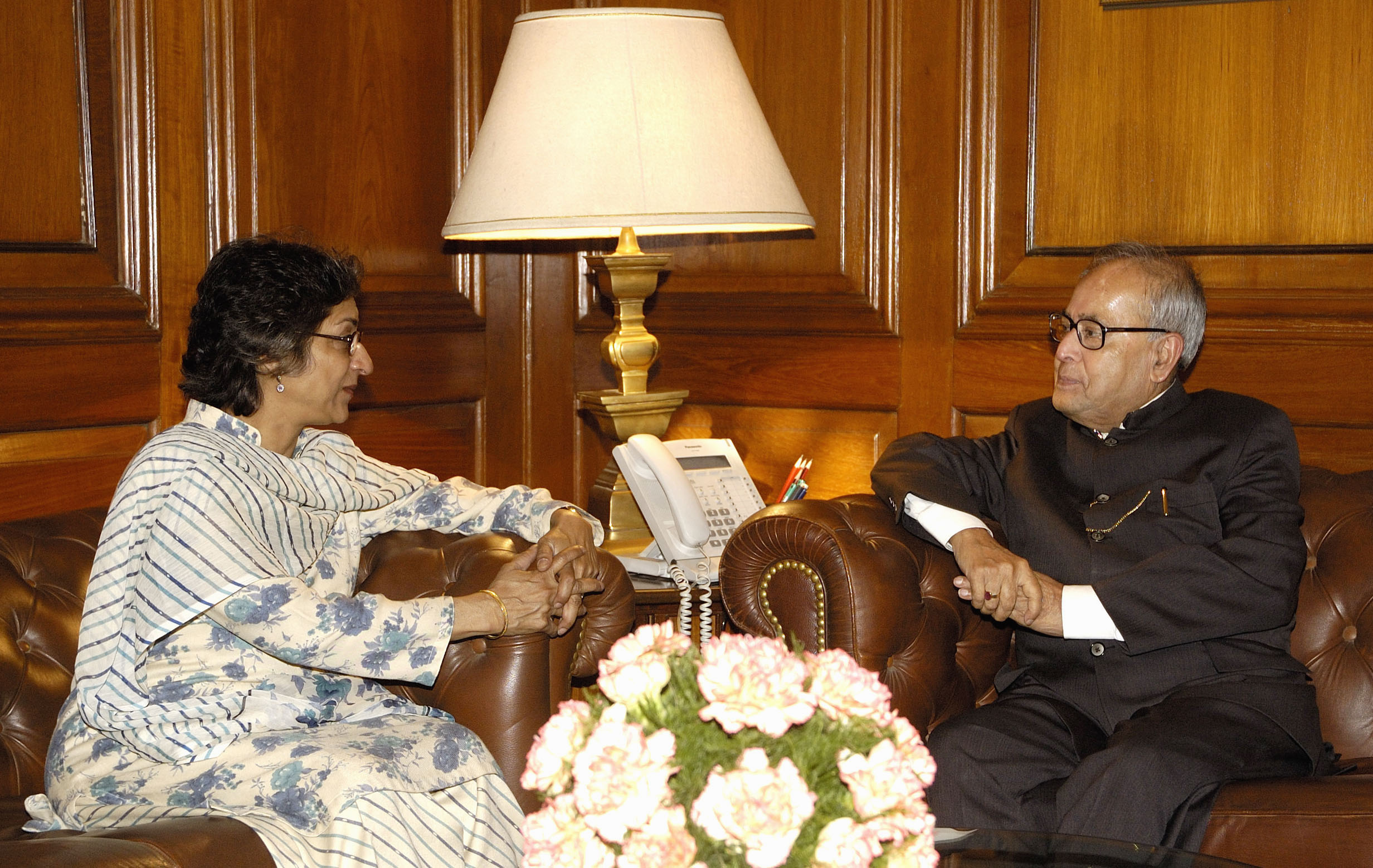
Jahangir with Pranab Mukherjee, then India's Minister of External Affairs

According to Dawn "many people go ballistic every time her name is mentioned", adding that "a pattern: often wild, unsubstantiated allegations are levelled against her." According to Herald "HRCP in general and Asma Jahangir in particular have also been branded as 'traitors' and 'American agents', trying to malign Pakistan and destroy the country's social and political fabric in the name of women’s rights and the rights of non-Muslims." Commenting on her legal style, Dawn wrote that she used "calculated aggression, wit and sharp one-liners." In the mid-1980s, the Zia-ul-Haq-appointed Majlis-e-Shoora passed a resolution claiming that Jahangir had blasphemed and she should be sentenced to death. She was found not guilty of blasphemy.

Declan Walsh, writing for The Guardian, described Jahangir's career as "for almost four decades she has towered over Pakistan's human rights war." Adding that "she has championed battered wives, rescued teenagers from death row, defended people accused of blasphemy, and sought justice for the victims of honour killings. These battles have won her admirers and enemies in great number." Abbas Nasir has described her as the "gutsiest woman that Pakistan has". William Dalrymple, writing for The New Yorker, described Jahangir as Pakistan's "most visible and celebrated—as well as most vilified—human-rights lawyer", adding that she has "spent her professional life fighting for a secular civil society, challenging the mullahs and generals."

Several conservative and nationalist commenters have written extensively against Jahangir. Ansar Abbasi and Orya Maqbool Jan have been critical of Jahangir. On 3 September 2013, NDTV reported that US intelligence agencies had uncovered evidence of a plot hatched by Pakistani security officials to use militants to kill human rights activist Asma Jahangir in India in May 2012. Jahangir has received numerous threats over the years due to her activism and human rights work and particularly after defending a 14-year-old Christian boy, Salamat Masih, accused of blasphemy and ultimately winning the case in 1995, a mob at the High Court smashed Jahangir's car, assaulted her and her driver, threatening her with death. Jahangir and her family have been attacked, taken hostage, had their home broken into and received death threats ever since, but she continued her battle for justice.

When Jahangir undertook the case of Saima Sarwar in 1999, who was given shelter at Dastak after leaving her husband, wanting a divorce and later gunned down by her family in an act of honour killing, Jahangir received death threats for representing Saima in her divorce proceedings. In May 2005 Jahangir announced that she would hold a symbolic mixed-gender marathon in Lahore to raise awareness about violence against women. This was following the revelations of cases such as Mukhtar Mai. Tensions boiled over, as Islamist groups and supporters of the political Islamist alliance Muttahida Majlis-e-Amal (MMA) armed with firearms, batons and Molotov cocktails, violently opposed the race, and Jahangir received especially rough treatment from local police and intelligence agents, who began to strip off her clothes in public. Of this Jahangir said "A lot of people tried to cover my back because I could only feel it I could not see my back. When they were putting me on the police van, they assured that my photograph was taken while my back was bare. This was just to humiliate, this was simply just to humiliate me." A police officer told Jahangir that they had orders to be strict and to tear off the participant's clothes. In addition she along with other participants was also beaten.

The character of Saamiya Siddiqui, a lawyer in the 2004 Indian film Veer-Zaara portrayed by Rani Mukherji, was based on Jehangir where she fights for the case of an Indian Air Force officer imprisoned on false charges in Pakistan. She had also appeared as an interviewee on an Indian television talk show Not a Nice Man to Know (1998), hosted by Khushwant Singh, on Star TV India.

== Author ==
In addition to many publications, Jahangir wrote two books: Divine Sanction? The Hudood Ordinance (1988, 2003) and Children of a Lesser God: Child Prisoners of Pakistan (1992). She also wrote the article "Whither are We!", published in Dawn, on 2 October 2000.

== Death and legacy ==
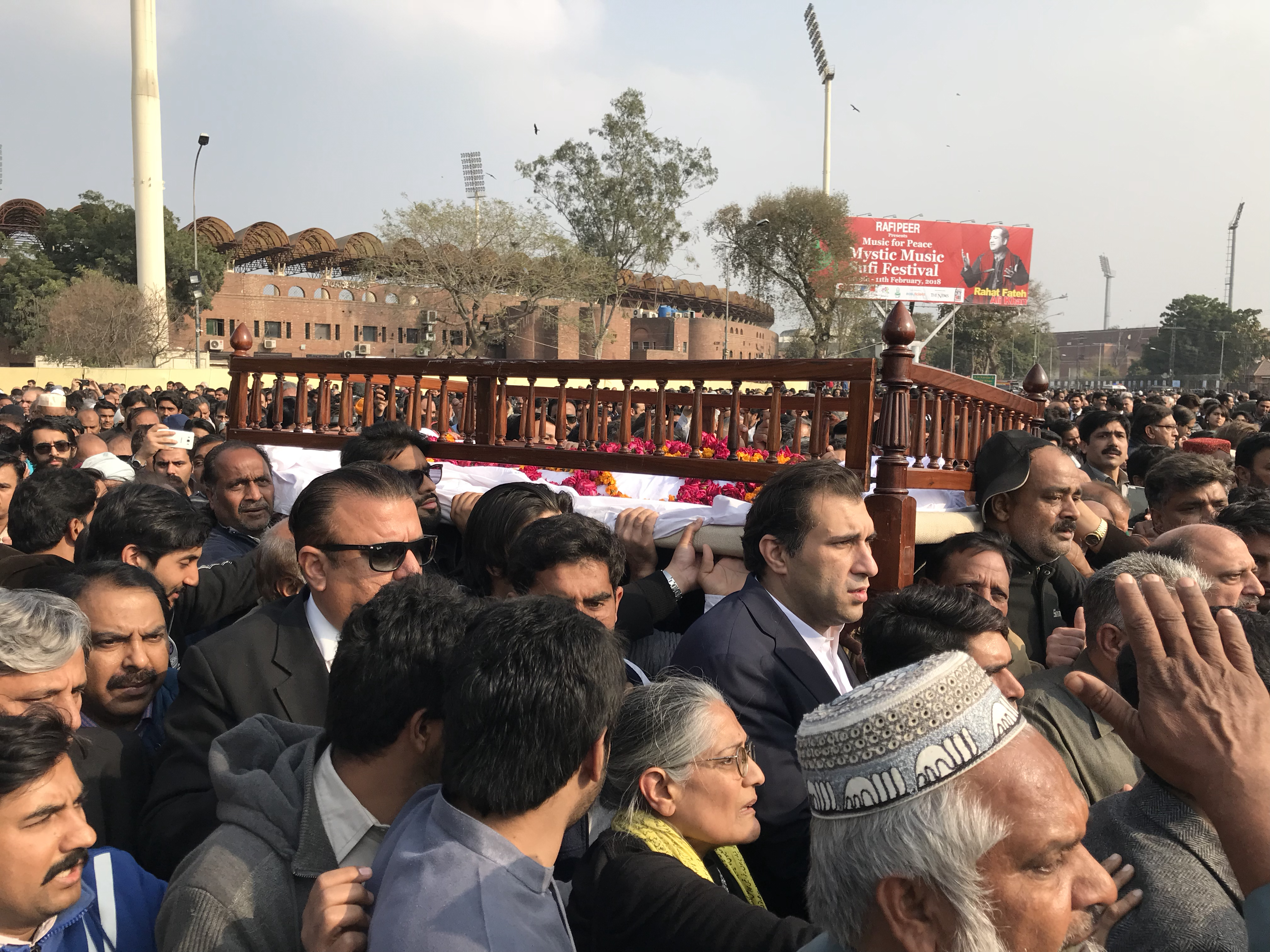
Funeral

Jahangir suffered from cardiac arrest in Lahore on 11 February 2018 and later died in hospital.

An international event titled the Asma Jahangir Conference is held in Lahore each organised by her law firm AGHS Legal Aid Cell. It is one of the largest human rights and law conference in South Asia and attracts lawmakers, members of the judiciary, civil society organisations and human rights activists from across the region.

== Awards ==
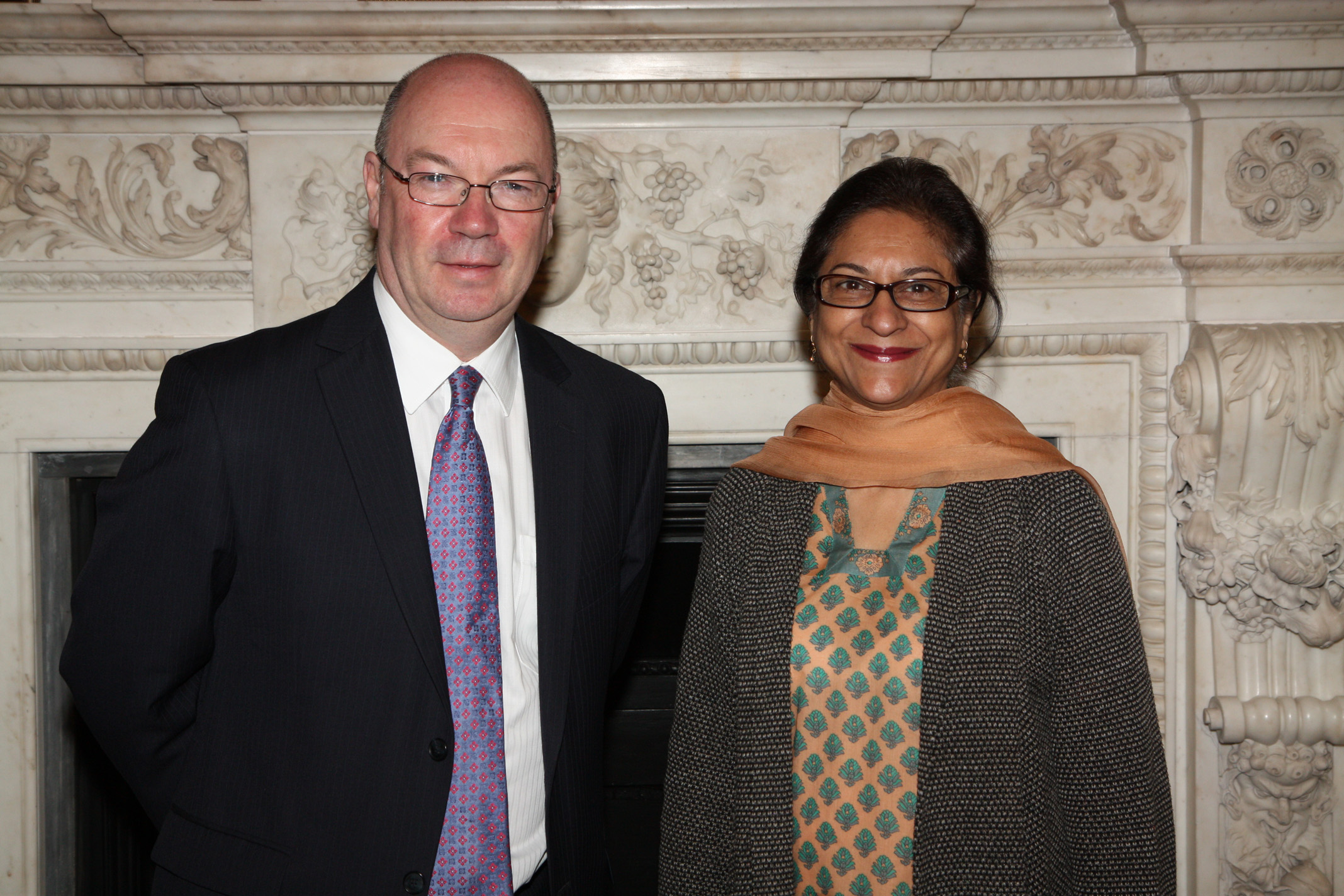
Foreign Office Minister Alistair Burt of United Kingdom.

- In 1995, Jahangir received the Martin Ennals Award for Human Rights Defenders as well as the Ramon Magsaysay Award for "greatness of spirit shown in service of the people".
- In 2000, she received the King Baudouin International Development Prize as chair of the Human Rights Commission of Pakistan
- In 2001, Jahangir and her sister Hina Jilani were awarded the Millennium Peace Prize by UNIFEM (the United Nations Development Fund for Women) in collaboration with the non-governmental organisation International Alert.
- In 2002 she was awarded the Lisl and Leo Eitinger Prize.
- In 2005, she was nominated for the Nobel Peace Prize as part of the 1000 Women for Peace project.
- On 29 May 2010, at the International Four Freedoms Award 2010 Jahangir received the Freedom of Worship Medal for her Human Rights and Religious Freedom activism, in a ceremony held in the Nieuwe Kerk in Middelburg, Holland.
- On 23 March 2010, for services in Human Rights, she was awarded the Hilal-i-Imtiaz, the second highest civilian award of Pakistan.
- On 27 October 2010, she won the Supreme Court Bar Association of Pakistan election by defeating her competitor Ahmad Awais and securing 834 of total votes and became the first ever women President of SCBA in the history of Pakistan. .
- On 10 December 2010, she was awarded with the 2010 UNESCO/Bilbao Prize for the Promotion of a Culture of Human Rights, recognising her efforts as a human rights defender.
- In 2012, she received the North-South Prize of the Council of Europe.
- On 13 April 2013, a video surfaced on the social media showing Asma Jehangir receiving "Friends of Liberation War Honour" award by the Bangladeshi Prime Minister Sheikh Hasina on behalf of her late father Malik Ghulam Jilani who had supported the liberation war for Bangladesh. The video created quite an uproar in Pakistan.
- On 10 February 2014, Asma was awarded with the Highest French Civil Award Légion d'Honneur.
- On 4 June 2014, she was awarded with the "Stefanus Prize", a Human Rights Prize emphasising the Freedom of Religion or Belief (Article 18 in the Universal Declaration of Human Rights.)
- On 1 December 2016, she was awarded The Right Livelihood Award for defending, protecting and promoting human rights in Pakistan and more widely, often in very difficult and complex situations and at great personal risk.
- On 26 October 2018, she was awarded United Nations Human Rights Award posthumously for her contributions that promote and protect human rights
- She was posthumously awarded Pakistan's highest civilian award, the Nishan-e-Imtiaz in 2018.

== See also ==
- Human Rights Commission of Pakistan
- United Nations
- Hina Jilani
- Asma Jahangir Conference
