= Rifaat Hussain =

Pakistani political scientist (1952–2025)

- رفعت حسین
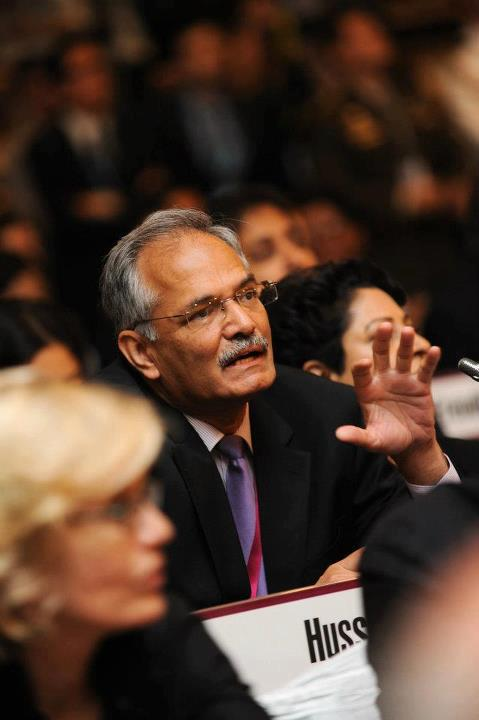
- Rifaat Hussain, 2012
- Born: April 1, 1952; Pakistan
- Died: March 7, 2025 (aged 72)
- Occupations: Political scientist Defense analyst Academic
- Years active: 1980s–2025
- Relatives: Syed Talat Hussain (brother)

Academic background
- Education: Josef Korbel School of International Studies, University of Denver (MA, PhD)

Academic work
- Institutions: Quaid-i-Azam University; National University of Sciences and Technology

Rifaat Hussain (Urdu: سید رفعت حسین; 1 April 1952 – 7 March 2025) was a Pakistani political scientist, defence analyst and television personality whose career spanned over four decades. He was professor and consultant in the Department of Government Policy and Public Administration at Pakistan's National University of Sciences and Technology.

In 2021, The New York Times Magazine described Hussain as a "leading Pakistani foreign policy thinker."

Hussain died on 7 March 2025, at the age of 72.

== Early life and education ==
Hussain earned his M.A. and Ph.D. from The Josef Korbel School of International Studies at the University of Denver, United States.

== Academic career ==
Hussain held associations with Quaid-i-Azam University for 36 years, and also headed the Department of Government Policy and Public Administration at the National University of Sciences and Technology, a top-ranked public research university in Pakistan.

From 2005 to 2008, he served as the executive director of the Regional Centre for Strategic Studies (RCSS), a Colombo-based think tank in Sri Lanka, and spent two terms as visiting professor at Stanford University’s Center for International Security and Cooperation (CISAC).

Both The Economist and the BBC interviewed Hussain on issues pertaining to South Asian security, including the Kashmir conflict, U.S. involvement in Afghanistan, Pakistan's counter-terrorism efforts, NATO and India-Pakistan engagement.

The Carnegie Endowment for International Peace, The Stimson Center and The Atlantic Council cite Hussain's insights as part of their published compilations and reports.

== Political career ==
He was one of 18 members on the Advisory Committee on Foreign Affairs during the Imran Khan's government.

== Publications ==
Hussain's work appeared in The Washington Post, The New York Times, and his foreign policy views have been quoted by The Wall Street Journal, Reuters, The Guardian, Bloomberg, CNN, TIME, and The Atlantic. His published works include:

=== Selected works ===
Publication timeline
| Year | Work | Co-author(s) | Type | Publisher |
|---|---|---|---|---|
| 2005 | Proposals for Resolving the Kashmir Dispute | | Book | Institute of Strategic Studies, Islamabad |
| 2007 | "Deterrence and Nuclear Use: Doctrines in South Asia" (in The India–Pakistan Nuclear Relationship: Theories of Deterrence and International Relations) | | Book chapter | Routledge, London |
| 2013 | Development Challenges Confronting Pakistan | Anita M. Weiss; Saba Gul Khattak | Book | Sustainable Development Policy Institute, Islamabad |
