= Munizae Jahangir =

Pakistani journalist and filmmaker

Munizae Jahangir is a Pakistani television journalist and filmmaker who currently hosts the current affairs program Spotlight on Aaj TV.

== Early life and education ==
Jahangir was born in Pakistan to human rights activist Asma Jahangir and Tahir Jahangir. On her mother's side, she is the niece of Hina Jilani, a well-known Pakistani lawyer and human rights activist from Lahore, Pakistan who is Asma Jahangir's younger sister.

Jahangir obtained her BA degree in Political science and English from McGill University in Montreal, Canada. Additionally, she has an MA in Media studies with a concentration in film and video from New School University, New York, USA.

== Career ==
=== Journalism ===
Jahangir has reported on politics in Pakistan and has been vocal about the struggles of female journalists in Pakistan, and co-founded South-Asian Women in Media (SAWM) to address this issue. SAWM is an organization for and by female journalists that works to protect freedom of the press and promote increased presence as well as equal treatment of women in media. When interviewed by Maheen Irfan Ghani for Newsline Magazine in April 2012, Jahangir spoke openly and explicitly about her experiences with sexism in the media industry.

=== Filmmaking ===
In 2003, Jahangir produced and directed a feature length documentary about the lives of four Afghan women from the 1920s to the present day, throughout the turbulent history of Afghanistan. This documentary, called "Search for Freedom" was selected as one out of sixteen films screened by Amnesty International at their USA film festivals.

Jahangir co-produced a documentary on the street children of Lahore, which was then aired in community centres across Pakistan.

Jahangir was a research assistant and camera-person in the making of a documentary about women who were victims of Acid attacks. This documentary was aired on Indus Media Group Television in Dubai, UAE.

Jahangir worked with Pakistani director, Samina Peerzada, to make Peerzada's sophomore directorial project Shararat (2003). This was a romantic comedy, released in 2003, with a less-than-successful reception at the Pakistani box office. However, songs from the soundtrack composed by the film's music director Wajahat Attre were mega-hits in the country. Songs such as Jugnuon Sey Bhar Ley Aanchal, performed by Ali Zafar and Shabnam Majeed, with lyrics by Aqeel Ruby.

== Human rights advocacy ==
Jahangir is on the board of Asma Jahangir Foundation, besides the AGHS Legal Aid Cell, where she provides legal aid to women, children, and marginalized communities free of charge.

She is an active member of the Human Rights Commission of Pakistan, like her mother before her.

== Achievements and honours ==
In 2008, Jahangir was honored as a Young Global Leader by the World Economic Forum.

She accepted the United Nations Human Rights Prize for 2018 on her mother's behalf, dedicating the quinquennial award to Pakistani women and their courage.
