= Shamyl Hussain =

Pakistani Cricketer

Personal information
- Full name: Shamyl Hussain
- Born: 10 October 2004 (age 22); Islamabad, Pakistan
- Batting: Left-handed
- Role: Batter
- Relatives: Syed Talat Hussain (father)

International information
- National side: Pakistan (2026–present)
- ODI debut (cap 258): 11 March 2026 v Bangladesh
- Last ODI: 13 March 2026 v Bangladesh

Domestic team information
- Years: Team
- 2024: Pakistan Under-19
- 2025-present: Pakistan Shaheens

Career statistics
Competition	FC	LA	ODIs
Matches	26	14	1
Runs scored	2019	560	4
Batting average	45.88	43.07	4
100s/50s	6/9	2/3	0/0
Top score	229	143	4
Balls bowled	6	0	0
Wickets	0	0	0
Bowling average	0	0	0
5 wickets in innings	0	0	0
10 wickets in match	0	0	0
Best bowling	0	0	0
Catches/stumpings	24/–	4/–	0/0
- Source: ESPNcricinfo, March 2026

Shamyl Hussain (Urdu: شمائل حسین born 10 October 2004) is a Pakistani cricketer who represents Pakistan national cricket team. He made his One Day International debut on 11 March 2026 against Bangladesh. Hussain is part of Quetta Gladiators squad in Pakistan Super League.

== Domestic career ==
Shamyl has played for Pakistan Television cricket team in Quaid-e-Azam Trophy. He was also part of Islamabad United in Pakistan Super League and now represents Quetta Gladiators. He also represents Islamabad team in President Cup.

Hussain has captained Pakistan Shaheens in a series against England Loins.

== International career ==
Hussain was part of Pakistan's ODI squad in a series against Bangladesh. He made his One Day International debut on 11 March 2026 against Bangladesh.

== Personal life ==
He is the son of Pakistani journalist and television anchor Syed Talat Hussain. He often comes under criticism for nepotism for his father's position at Pakistan Television.
