= Syed Talat Hussain =

Pakistani journalist (born 1966)

- Born: 5 May 1966 (age 60); Chakwal, West Pakistan (present-day Punjab, Pakistan)
- Occupations: Television personality Cricketer
- Years active: 1990 – present
- Children: 3, including Shamyl Hussain
- Relatives: Rifaat Hussain (brother)

Syed Talat Hussain (Urdu: سید طلعت حسین; born 5 May 1966) is a Pakistani journalist, YouTuber, and former cricketer. He currently hosts a prime time current affairs talk show on Samaa TV titled Red Line with Talat.

== Personal life ==
=== Education ===
Hussain holds a master’s degree from Quaid-i-Azam University, Islamabad.

=== Cricket ===
In 2001, Hussain played one List A cricket match for the Islamabad cricket team but had to discontinue the game due to a back injury.

=== Family ===
Syed Talat Hussain is the brother of the political scientist and defence analyst Rifaat Hussain.

His son, Shamyl Hussain, is a cricketer.

== Media career ==
Hussain began his career in journalism in the 1990s and subsequently established himself as a prominent figure in Pakistani media. Over the course of his career, he has held several senior editorial positions, including serving as Executive Director of News and Current Affairs at AAJ TV. He has worked with multiple national television networks, including PTV, Dawn News, and Geo News. He has hosted a prime-time current affairs talk show, Red Line with Talat, on Samaa TV. In addition to his work in television, he is active on digital media platforms, where he produces commentary on political and social issues through his YouTube channel. He has also contributed to print journalism, writing for publications such as Newsline, Daily Dawn, and Daily Times.

=== Alleged Pakistan Tehreek-e-Insaf interference ===
In 2022, Hussain, who had been a vocal critic of the PTI government and Imran Khan, faced many problems during the PTI ruling period; he was taken off air by Geo News among many other things to cause him problems due to his reporting.

== Current affairs TV shows ==
- Sawaray Sawaray - PTV
- News Night - PTV
- Live with Talat - AAJ TV (First Show: 23 March 2005, Last Show: 29 Oct 2010)
- News Night With Talat– Dawn News (First Show: 8 November 2010)
- Live with Talat - Express News (TV channel) (June, 2012 to August 2013)
- Live with Talat - AAJ TV ( January 2014 to May 2014)
- Naya Pakistan with Talat Hussain - Geo News ( February 2015 to November 2018 )

== Publications ==
- State of the Pakistani Media, Friedrich-Ebert-Stiftung, 1996, 26 p.
- Journalism Education in Pakistan: Problems and Solutions, Friedrich-Ebert-Stiftung, 1996, 53 p. Co-authored with Martin Loeffelholz.
- The Basics of Reporting and Editing, Friedrich-Ebert-Stiftung, 1997, 37 p.

== See also ==
- Daily Times (Pakistan)
- List of Pakistani journalists
- Nadeem Malik (Pakistani journalist)
- Faisal Qureshi
