= Nadeem Malik (journalist) =

Pakistani journalist

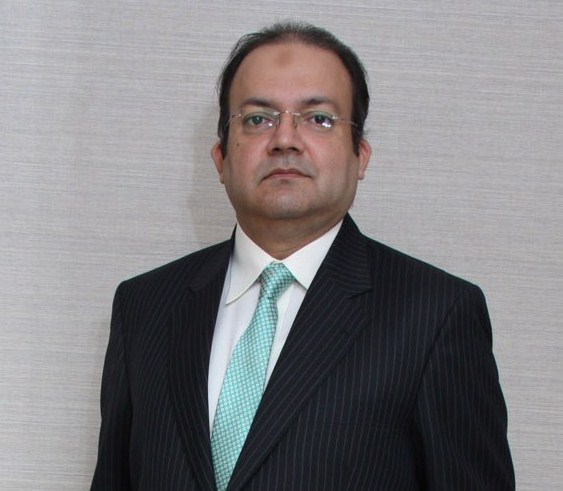
- Born: Nadeem Malik; 13 April 1968 (age 58); Sheikhupura, Punjab, Pakistan
- Occupation: Television Personality
- Years active: 1990–present
- Employer(s): Samaa TV; Aaj News; The News International; Radio Pakistan; PTV News; CNBC Pakistan
- Title: President Islamabad
- Children: 3 sons 1 daughter
- Awards: Sitara-i-Imtiaz (Star of Excellence) Award by the President of Pakistan in 2023 Tamgha-e-Imtiaz (Medal of Excellence) Award by President of Pakistan on August 14, 2025
- Website: nadeemmalik.wordpress.com

Nadeem Malik (Urdu: ندیم ملک) is a Pakistani journalist. He is president of the news channel Samaa TV, and hosts the current affairs programme Live. He was also Senior Executive Vice President of Hum News.

He was formerly director of programmes at AAJ TV, and hosted the daily talk show Islamabad Tonight.

== Early life and family ==
Nadeem Malik was born to a Pashtun-Kakazai family in Sheikhupura on 13 April 1968.

== Journalistic and media career ==
Malik served as the Bureau Chief of Islamabad for CNBC Pakistan, and hosted the talk show News Guru. He has worked for local and international news journals as a freelancer, including for BBC Online, Asia Times, and The News International newspaper.

As a host, he has conducted discussion programs featuring politicians, economists and other professionals. He covered the 2002, 2008 and 2013 Pakistani general elections, the Parliamentary sessions for elections of the Prime Minister of Pakistan, and Speakers of the National Assembly of Pakistan. He was an analyst and commentator for current affairs programs for international TV, before joining CNBC Pakistan in 2006.

He was the host for programmes on PTV News, Current Affairs Channel, and Radio Pakistan before the advent of private news channels in Pakistan in 2002. He hosted News Morning and News Night for PTV.

He interviewed national and international leaders, including American Secretary of State Hillary Clinton, Sri Lankan President Chandrika Kumaratunga, Malaysian Prime Minister Abdullah Ahmad Badawi, and Afghan President Hamid Karzai, and has interviewed almost every Pakistani President and Prime Minister since 1990.

== Awards and recognition ==
- Sitara-i-Imtiaz (Star of Excellence) Award by the President of Pakistan for his services in journalism.
- Tamgha-e-Imtiaz (Medal of Excellence) Award by President of Pakistan on August 14, 2025, in recognition of his outstanding services in the field of journalism during Marka-e-Haq, India-Pakistan war of May 2025.

== See also ==
- Samaa TV
- List of Pakistani journalists
- Hum News
