= Hina Jilani =

Pakistani human rights advocate (born 1953)

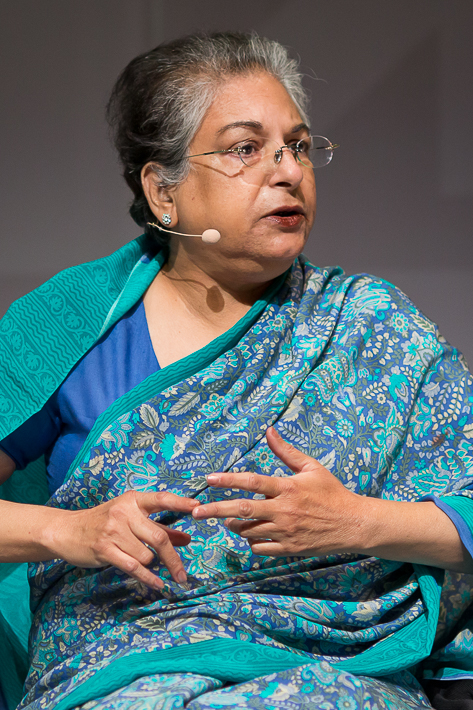
Jilani speaking at Women Deliver in 2016.

Hina Jilani (Urdu: حنا جیلانی؛ born 19 December 1953) is a lawyer at the Supreme Court of Pakistan and a human rights advocate from Lahore, Punjab. She co-founded Pakistan's first all-women law firm, its first legal aid centre, and the Women's Action Forum.

== Early life and education ==
Jilani was born and raised in Lahore, Pakistan. After law graduation, she started practising law in 1979, while joining the law chamber of barrister Ijaz Hussain Batalvi, at a time when Pakistan was under martial law.

== Career ==
In February 1980, with her sister Asma Jahangir, Jilani co-founded Pakistan's first all-female legal aid practice, AGHS Legal Aid Cell (ALAC) in Lahore. Initially, its activities were confined to providing legal aid to women, but these activities gradually increased to include legal education, protection from exploitation, legal research, and counselling. She is also one of the founders of the Human Rights Commission of Pakistan as well as the Women's Action Forum (WAF), an advocacy group established in 1980, to campaign against discriminatory legislation. Jilani also founded Pakistan's first legal aid centre in 1986. In addition to providing pro bono legal aid, she helped set up a women's shelter called Dastak in 1991. In addition to managing the shelter, Dastak organises workshops to raise awareness for human rights and the protection of women.

Jilani is also affiliated with the United Nations Human Rights Council, the Carter Center, and the UN Conference on Women. In 2019, the UK Foreign Office appointed her to a panel of experts to develop legal frameworks to protect freedom of the press across the globe.

=== Roles at the United Nations ===
From 2000 to 2008, Jilani was the United Nations Special Representative of the Secretary-General on Human Rights Defenders. During that period, she was also appointed to the International Commission of Inquiry on Darfur in 2006.

In 2009, Jilani was appointed to the United Nations Fact Finding Mission on the Gaza Conflict.

In 2017, Jilani co-chaired (alongside Tarja Halonen) the World Health Organization/Office of the United Nations High Commissioner for Human Rights High-Level Working Group on the Health and Human Rights of Women, Children, and Adolescents.

== Threats ==
As a result of their women's activism, Jilani and her sister Asma Jahangir have been arrested, received death threats, and faced intimidation and public abuse. Murder attempts have been made on them as well as members of their family. In 1999, after working on the case of Samia Sarwar, Jilani and Jahangir were again subject to death threats. Sarwar's mother came with a gunman to her office on the pretext of seeking reconciliation with her daughter. The gunman shot Sarwar dead and fired at Jilani, who managed to escape. On another occasion, gunmen entered her house and threatened members of her family. Jilani herself was away from home; the threats put pressure on her to migrate, but she continues to live and work in Lahore.

== Recognition ==
- 2000 – Ginetta Sagan Award from Amnesty International
- 2001 – Millennium Peace Prize for Women
- 2008 – Editor's Award for Outstanding Achievement by The Lawyer Awards
- 2016 – Honorary doctorate from Trinity College Dublin

== Articles ==
- Neither Peace Nor Justice for Newsline, 2 March 2009
- Shame on Who? for Newsline, 7 October 2005
- Profile in TIME

== See also ==
- Supreme Court Bar Association of Pakistan
- Human Rights Commission of Pakistan
- Asma Jahangir
- Asma Jahangir Conference
