= Freedom of Information laws in Pakistan =

The Right of Access to Information Act No. F. 22 (30)/2017 creates the legal right to information and promotes government accountability and increased public participation in government.

== Constitutional structure ==
Prior to 2010 the 1973 Constitution of Pakistan did not explicitly recognize citizens’ right to access information as it states that "every citizen shall have the right to freedom of speech and expression, and there shall be freedom of the press, subject to any reasonable restrictions imposed by law”. As Pakistan signed the International Covenant for Civil and Political rights (ICCR), it was required to incorporate a right to information in its legal structure. The right to access information added to the Constitution by the 18th Amendment, which declared that under Article 19-A “Every citizen shall have the right to have access to information in all matters of public importance subject to regulation and reasonable restrictions imposed by law.” Both federal and provincial governments issued various laws in order to allow Pakistani citizens to exercise their right to access public data.

== History ==
Pakistan was the first South Asian country to enact a law on freedom of information, having passed the Freedom of Information (FOI) Ordinance at the Federal level in 1997. This Ordinance was later revoked and a new Freedom of Information Ordinance was issued in 2002, which has a legal status to this day as it was covered under the 17th Amendment to the Constitution. In 2004, the Freedom of Information Rules 2004 were enforced by the Federal Government, which described the procedural aspect of the Freedom of Information Ordinance. In 2016, a draft of a new federal Right to Information (RTI) bill was proposed by Pakistan's federal government in hopes of replacing the Freedom of Information Ordinance of 2002, but the approval of the bill is still pending.

== Federal ==
The FOI Ordinance authorizes Pakistani citizens to gain access to data held by the national government. The Ordinance only pertains to the Federal Government organizations and does not apply to any provincial governments or private entities funded by the national government. The Freedom of Information Rules 2004 details the procedure through which the governmental data can be requested: applicants must pay a fee and enclose the purpose of their inquiry by providing specific reasons as to why they need the information. If the requested information is not provided in 21 days, the applicant may file a complaint to the head of the public body. Only access to public records is permitted, which excludes such documents as notes, timings of meetings, personal bank account data, classified information, data pertaining to national security, etc. The draft of the federal RTI bill is not significantly different from the FOI Ordinance of 2004, however, it has a change in scope as the new bill is not restricted to only governmental organizations, but it also applies to non-governmental bodies that are funded or registered by the national government.

== Provincial ==
The FOI Ordinance of 2004 laid the basis for the following two provincial laws: The Baluchistan Freedom of Information Act in 2005 and Sindh Freedom of Information Act in 2006. In addition, the Khyber Pakhtunkhwa Right to Information Act (KPK RTI) and the Punjab Transparency and Right to Information Ordinance were both passed in 2013. The KPK RTI Act covers not only official governmental bodies, but also non-governmental entities that are funded by the government (for example, locally funded public service organizations). The Punjab RTI Act can be used not only by the citizens of Pakistan, but also by legal bodies that are registered within Pakistan territorial borders. Sindh repealed and replaced its 2006 Act a decade later with the Sindh Transparency and Right to Information Act, 2016.
