= Sindh Freedom of Information Act, 2006 =

The Sindh Freedom of Information Act of 2006 is a now repealed Freedom of Information law which was passed by the Provincial Assembly of Sindh in the year 2006 and it was published for general information as required by Rule 83 of the Rules of Procedure of the Provincial Assembly of Sindh.

This act was passed for providing transparency and freedom of information to the citizens of Province Sindh and to ensure that the citizens of this province have improved access to public records and for the purpose to make the Provincial Government more accountable to its citizen, and for matters connected therewith or incidental thereto.

The law was repealed and replaced by the Sindh Transparency and Right to Information Act, 2016.
