= Asma Shirazi =

Pakistani journalist

- Born: Islamabad, Punjab, Pakistan
- Education: University of the Punjab
- Occupations: TV Anchor, journalist, columnist, political commentator
- Years active: 2000–present
- Notable work: Faisla Aap Ka (TV show)
- Television: Hum News; PTV News; Geo News; ARY News; Samaa TV; Dawn News; BOL Network; 92 News; Aaj News
- Awards: The Peter Mackler Award For Courageous and Ethical Journalism in 2014

Asma Shirazi is a Pakistani journalist and political commentator who has hosted a primetime current-affairs show on Hum News since 2024.

== Early life and education ==
Born in Islamabad in 1976, Shirazi studied political science at Punjab University, she worked as a radio presenter with Radio Pakistan and later moved to Geo News in 2001. In 2006, Shirazi became Pakistan's first female war correspondent when she reported from the 2006 Lebanon War and later from Pakistan-Afghanistan border in 2009. Shirazi is a member of The Coalition For Women In Journalism.

== Career ==
Shirazi began her career with PTV in 2000, moved to Geo News in 2002 and would go on to acquire a diverse variety of experience as a reporter and anchor with numerous channels. After working with Geo News, she joined ARY News in 2007 as an anchor and host of their current affairs program and later joined SAMAA TV in July 2010. She then hosted the widely acclaimed show, ‘Faisla Aap Ka’, with Dawn News.

She was recognized for her comprehensive, unbiased and fair journalistic skills with the award of 'Best Current Affairs Anchor'. In 2014, she was again hosting 'Faisla Awam Ka' for Dawn News. Then she started hosting 'Faisla Aap Ka', though in a different format and from a different platform of Aaj News.

Shirazi has also reported from the front on numerous conflicts that include the 2006 Israel-Lebanon conflict, Taliban violence on the Pakistan-Afghanistan border in 2009 as well as the state of emergency announced by General Pervez Musharraf in Pakistan in 2007. She also covered the 2005 Kashmir earthquake.

Previously, she has worked at many Pakistani TV channels including Samaa TV (joined this TV channel in July 2010), GEO News and later on ARY News BOL News, Dawn News, Express News. She also hosted two popular television talk shows, including one on parliamentary affairs named Parliament Cafeteria that President Pervez Musharraf banned when he clamped down on independent news coverage. Shirazi joined BOL News on 24 October 2014 as Executive Vice President and Senior Anchorperson.

== 2011 Government-funded Hajj controversy ==
In 2011, Asma Shirazi was featured in an episode of Apna Gareban, a television program hosted by journalist Matiullah Jan that investigated conflicts of interest within Pakistani media. Earlier that year, she was among approximately 30 prominent Pakistani journalists who travelled to Saudi Arabia for the Islamic Hajj pilgrimage funded by the Pakistani government.

Slate reported that, when Jan questioned her about the trip, Shirazi defended her decision by saying that she had been misled about the funding. She subsequently stated that she still would have gone even if she had known that the trip was publicly funded. She argued that Jan should go after "real big criminals," such as journalists who allegedly received land as bribes and then agreed to repay the money. Jan criticised Shirazi, telling her that as taxpayers were hungry for food and thirsting for water and "scrounging for every cent they can get," she spent "hundreds of thousands of rupees to go on a free ride to the pilgrimage."

== Awards and recognition ==
- Peter Mackler Award for Courageous and Ethical Journalism (2014)
