= Aaj News =

Pakistani television news channel

AAJ NEWS HD آج نیوز
- AAJ News logo since March 2009
- Country: Pakistan
- Headquarters: Karachi, Sindh, Pakistan

Programming
- Language: Urdu
- Picture format: (1080p 16:9 HDTV, MPEG-4)

Ownership
- Owner: Business Recorder Group
- Sister channels: Aaj Entertainment; Play Entertainment

History
- Launched: March 23, 2005; 21 years ago
- Former names: AAJ TV (2005–2009)

Links
- Website: aaj.tv

Aaj News HD (Urdu: آج نیوز, lit. 'Today News') is a 24-hour Pakistani news television channel. It is a privately owned Urdu language TV station which covers national and international news. It began as a hybrid channel (news, current affairs and entertainment), but later separated its entertainment programming to sister channel Aaj Entertainment, and became a news channel.

== History ==
Aaj News was started on 23 March 2005 by the Business Recorder Television Network, a subsidiary of Business Recorder Group which also operates Aaj Entertainment.

On 22 April 2007, PEMRA served a show-cause notice to Aaj News, for violating the 2002 PEMRA Ordinance by airing news and talk shows on an issue pending with the Supreme Judicial Council and unable to present a NOC from the Ministry of Information & Broadcasting.

On 23 March 2009, Aaj News was converted into a 24-hours news channel. The Recorder Television Network comprises Aaj News and Aaj Entertainment.

== Programmes ==
=== Hosts ===
==== Current ====
- Munizae Jahangir

==== Former hosts ====
- Azfar Rehman
- Asma Shirazi
- Sana Bucha
- Syed Talat Hussain
- Javed Ahmed Ghamidi
- Ali Saleem

== Former programs ==
- 3 Idiots
- News, Views & Confused (a satirical comedy hosted by Fasi Zaka)
- Aaj Rana Mubashir Kay Sath

== See also ==
- List of Pakistani television stations
- List of news channels in Pakistan
