= Human Rights Commission of Pakistan =

Non-profit organisation in Pakistan

The Human Rights Commission of Pakistan (HRCP; Urdu: ماموریہ برائے انسانی حقوق پاکستان, romanized: Mamoria Baraye Ansani Haquq Pakistan) is an independent, democratic non-profit organisation. Founded in 1987, it is one of the oldest human rights organisations in the country.

HRCP is committed to monitoring, protecting and promoting human rights in Pakistan. It is not associated with the government or with any political party.

== Mission ==
HRCP's goal is the realization of the entire body of human rights, as defined in international instruments, by all citizens of Pakistan as well as all persons otherwise present in the country. This goal applies without any distinction or discrimination on grounds of gender, race, belief or religion, domicile, disability, socioeconomic status, and sexual identity or orientation. It applies particularly to vulnerable or disadvantaged groups, such as women, children, members of ethnic and religious minorities, workers, peasants and victims of human rights abuses.

== Scope of work ==
HRCP's scope of work includes:

- Advocacy campaigns to raise public awareness of human rights through publications, workshops, public meetings and rallies.
- Focusing attention onto areas in which human rights have been denied or violated, by collecting, publishing and disseminating data.
- Organising special fact-finding missions to probe the more serious violations of rights.
- Lobbying with the appropriate authorities to introduce and implement measures designed to check human rights abuse and promote respect for human rights by offering concrete alternatives.
- Providing redress to victims of human rights abuse by referring complaints and grievances to the authorities concerned and by extending legal aid in special cases or those that affect collective interests.
- Promoting democratic governance and the rule of law by generating ideas and pressure for (a) constitutional and legal reforms, (b) participatory democracy and communities’ role in governance, (c) fair electoral processes, (d) the independence of the judiciary and legal profession, (e) pro-people administration, and (f) minimum standards for law enforcement agencies with respect to the use of force and protection of the rights of litigants and detainees.
- Training and mobilising activists to promote awareness, advocacy and intervention.
- Networking and cooperation with similar organisations, both domestic and international, on broad human rights themes as well as specific issues.
- Liaising with the United Nations system, including the Universal Periodic Review, to exchange ideas on the areas listed above.

== Structure ==
HRCP comprises over 5,000 members across Pakistan and is governed by an executive council elected by its members.

The organisation's secretariat is based in Lahore, Punjab, Pakistan. It has seven regional offices in Gilgit, Hyderabad, Karachi, Multan, Peshawar, Quetta and Turbat. Additionally, the Centre for Democratic Development operates from Islamabad. All HRCP offices work with volunteer groups, augmented by active members in districts and towns across Pakistan.

== History ==
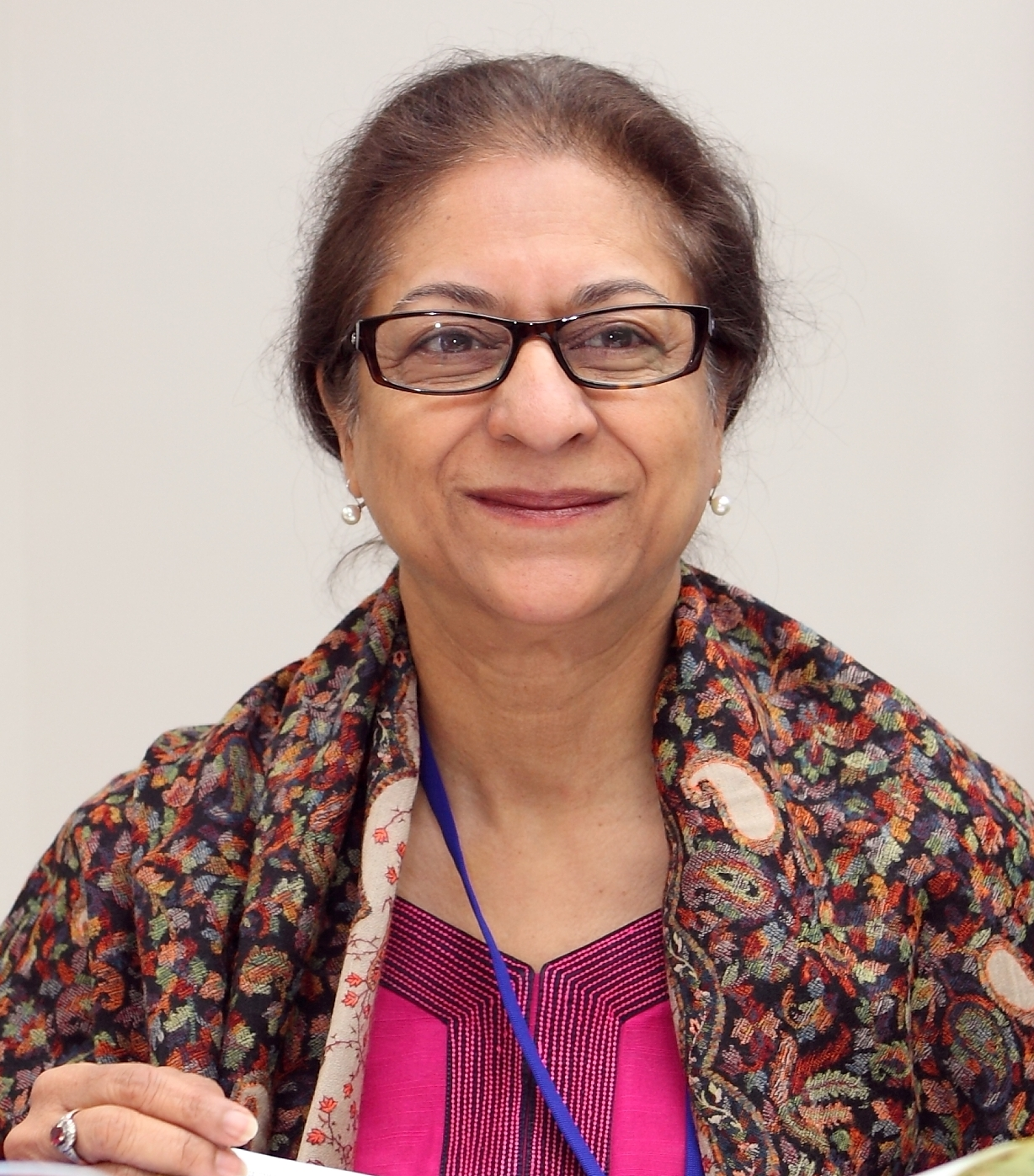
HRCP's co-founder Asma Jahangir

Co-founded in 1987 by Asma Jahangir and Ibn Abdur Rehman, HRCP has a wide mandate, including women's rights, including gender equality, violence against women, domestic violence, honour killings, enforced disappearances, the abolition of capital punishment, restrictions on press freedom, freedom of speech, freedom of religion and belief, freedom of movement, state excesses and religiously motivated violence. The commission is a member organisation of the Asian Forum for Human Rights and Development (FORUM-ASIA), the Global Network of Domestic Election Monitors (GNDEM), the International Federation of Human Rights (FIDH), South Asians for Human Rights (SAHR), and the World Coalition Against the Death Penalty.

As of 2020, Human Rights Commission of Pakistan's chairperson is Hina Jilani, internationally acclaimed human rights lawyer and former UN Special Representative on Human Rights Defenders.

== Some of HRCP’s achievements ==
Abolition of separate electorates. HRCP demanded that separate electorates be replaced by joint electorates at its foundation function in 1986. These demands were largely met in 2002.

Faith-based discrimination. HRCP's campaign against the insertion of a ‘religion’ column in people's national identity cards put pressure on the government to withdraw the move.

Bonded labor. The Bonded Labor System (Abolition) Act 1992 was drafted by HRCP and moved in Parliament by one of its board members. The draft was adopted and became law. The Supreme Court of Pakistan also accepted HRCP's petition whereby bonded haris can seek relief under this act.

Rule of law. In 1995, Prime Minister Benazir Bhutto asked HRCP to investigate the state of lawlessness in Karachi, Pakistan.

National Human Rights Commission. While revisiting the draft law on the establishment of the National Human Rights Commission, the Ministry of Human Rights sought and incorporated input from HRCP.

Death penalty. HRCP has consistently campaigned for the abolition of the death penalty. The government placed a moratorium on executions in late 2008, which was withdrawn five years later. Efforts to revive this moratorium and abolish capital punishment continue.

Electoral reforms. HRCP's proposal for electoral reforms was accepted by the government, including simultaneous polling for the national and provincial assemblies and extension of adult franchise to the Tribal Areas.

Torture. HRCP and Amnesty International have a long history of collaboration: in 2012, HRCP organised a joint training session for activists from Balochistan and Khyber Pakhtunkhwa on monitoring cases of torture.

Forced labor. HRCP's data on forced labor was used by the Special Rapporteur on contemporary forms of slavery in the annual report for 2016.

Enforced disappearances. HRCP has consistently brought the thorny issue of enforced disappearances to the public agenda. It raised the issue in the Supreme Court of Pakistan in 2007 and has continued filing cases.

International work with the UN. The selection of two HRCP council members—the late Asma Jahangir as a UN Special Rapporteur (on extra-legal killings as well as freedom of belief) and Hina Jilani as the UN Secretary General's first Representative for Human Rights Defenders—was largely in recognition of their work at, and for, HRCP. In 2013/14, they served on UN panels for Palestine and Sri Lanka. In 2010, HRCP was granted special consultative status with the UN Economic and Social Council.

== Honours ==
- Pax Christi International Peace Award, 2016

== See also ==
- Amnesty International
- Human Rights Campaign
- Human rights in Pakistan
- Human Rights Watch
- Ministry of Human Rights (Pakistan)
- Religious discrimination in Pakistan
- Asma Jahangir
- Naeem Sabir Jamaldini
- Hina Jilani
