= Cité internationale universitaire de Paris =

Private park and foundation in Paris, France

International University Campus of Paris Cité universitaire
- Campus of the universities of Paris
- Cité internationale universitaire de Paris
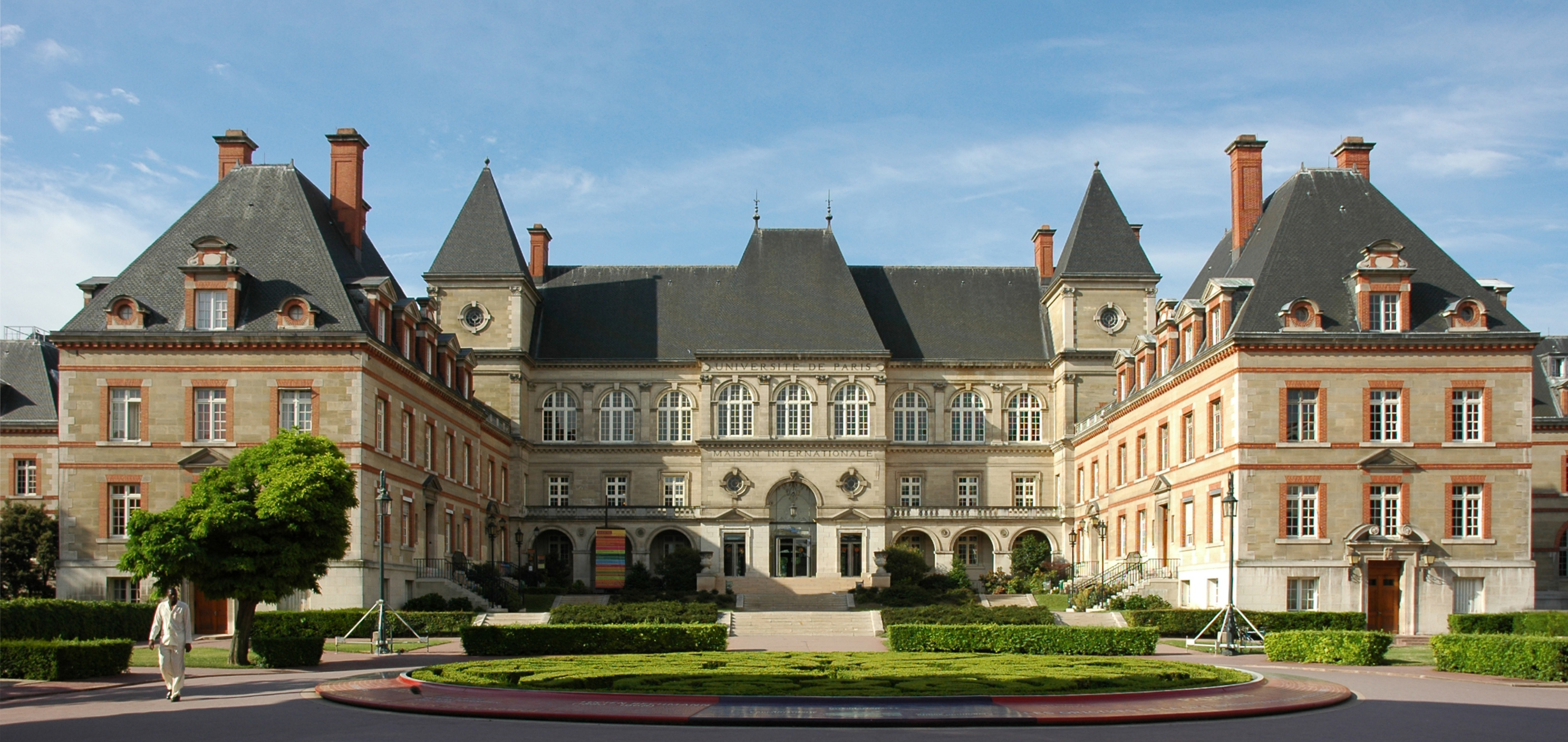
- The Maison internationale of the Cité universitaire.
- Interactive map of International University Campus of Paris
- Country: France
- Region: Île-de-France
- Ville: Paris
- Arrondissement: 14th
- Owner: Chancellerie des Universités de Paris
- Boroughs: Host: Fondation de la Cité internationale universitaire de Paris

Area
  - Total: 34 ha (84 acres)

Population
  - Total: 6,000 students
- Website: ciup.fr

Cité internationale universitaire de Paris (French pronunciation: [site ɛ̃tɛʁnɑsjɔnal ynivɛʁsitɛːʁ də paʁi]) or the Cité universitaire (CIUP or Cité U) is a university campus, a private park and foundation located in Paris, France. Since 1925, it has provided general and public services, including the maintenance of several dozen residences housing around 6,000 students and visiting academics in the Île-de-France region. Officially recognized as a foundation of public interest, the CIUP promotes exchanges between students from around the world in a spirit of tolerance.

The Cité universitaire de Paris is administered by the CIUP foundation, and the universities of Paris own the campus. They are represented by the Chancellery of the Universities of Paris, which sits on the foundation's board of directors.

== History ==
The Cité internationale universitaire de Paris was established after World War I by André Honnorat, rector at the Sorbonne, in cooperation with Émile Deutsch de la Meurthe, in order to create a meeting place for students, researchers and intellectuals from around the world in a spirit of peace, unity and friendly cooperation. The CIUP was originally built for the University of Paris, hence its name appears in several of its buildings, notably the Maison Internationale. Most of the buildings constructed for the University of Paris are now owned by the Chancellerie des Universités de Paris.

Several CIUP structures have been designed by architects of note, such as Le Corbusier, Willem Marinus Dudok, Heydar Ghiai and Claude Parent. The residences are organized mostly by nationality, although residents in each maison are not necessarily from the countries implied by building names. Up to 30%-50% of the student residents in each residence may come from different nationalities. In 2006, students of 132 different nationalities lived in the Cité Internationale.

Alongside two stadiums on campus, the CIUP has direct access to the Stade Sébastien Charléty, a 20,000 seat stadium which is home to the Paris Université Club, the sports club of the Université de Paris, located across the street.

== Location ==
Located in the 14th arrondissement of Paris, the CIUP is bounded to the south by the Boulevard Périphérique, the busy ring road encircling Paris, and to the north (in part) by the 38-acre Parc Montsouris. It is served by the Cité Universitaire station of the RER B and the Cité Universitaire stop on the T3a tramway. The university also has residences in the 19th arrondissement of Paris, both were acquired in the early 21st century.

== Residences ==
Plan of the Cité internationale universitaire, Paris, France.

	Name	Affiliation/dedication	Architect(s)	Inauguration	Picture
1	Fondation Rosa Abreu De Grancher	Rosa Abreu De Grancher, Cuba	Albert Laprade	1932	
2	Residence André Honnorat	André Honnorat		1953	
3	Fondation Argentine	Argentine		1928	
4	Maison des Étudiants Arméniens	Armenia	Leon Nafilyan	1930	
5	Maison des Arts et Métiers	École nationale supérieure d'arts et métiers		1949	
6	Maison de l'Asie du Sud-Est	Southeast Asia	Pierre Martin, Maurice Vieu	1930	
7	L/OBLIQUE, Centre de valorisation du patrimoine (formerly Fondation Avicenne) (former Pavillon de l'Iran)	The patrimony (formerly Avicenne) (formerly Iran)	Heydar Ghiai, Claude Parent	1969	
8	Fondation Biermans-Lapôtre	Belgium, Luxembourg	Armand Guéritte	1924	
9	Maison du Brésil	Brazil	Le Corbusier, Lucio Costa	1954	
10	Maison du Cambodge	Cambodia	Alfred Audoul	1957	
11	Maison des Etudiants Canadiens	Canada	Olivier Le Bras	1925	
12	Fondation Danoise	Denmark	Kaj Gottlob	1932	
13	Fondation Deutsch de la Meurthe	Émile Deutsch de la Meurthe, Louise Deutsch de la Meurthe	Lucien Bechmann	1925	
14	Collège d'Espagne	Spain		1927	
15	Fondation des États-Unis	United States of America	Pierre Leprince-Ringuet	1930	
16	Collège Franco-Britannique	Franco-British relations	Pierre Martin, Maurice Vieu	1937	
17	Maison du Portugal - André de Gouveia	André de Gouveia, Portugal		1960	
18	Fondation Haraucourt	Haraucourt, Island of Bréhat, Brittany, France		1939	
19	Fondation de l'Allemagne — Maison Heinrich Heine	Heinrich Heine, Germany		1956	
20	Fondation Hellénique	Greece	Nicolas Zahos	1932	
21	Maison de l'Inde	India		1967	
22	Maison des Industries Agricoles et Alimentaires	Industry of agriculture in France		1954	
23	Maison de l'Institut National Agronomique	Agronomy in France (Institut national agronomique Paris Grignon)		1928	
24	Maison de l'Italie	Italy	Piero Portaluppi	1958	
25	Maison du Japon	Japan	Pierre Sardou	1929	
26	Maison du Liban	Lebanon	Jean Vernon, Bruno Philippe	1948	
27	Residence Lila (19th arrondissement of Paris); 48.8789°N 2.4097°E	Lila		2005	
28	Residence Lucien Paye	Lucien Paye	Albert Laprade	1949	
29	Maison du Maroc	Morocco		1953	
30	Maison du Mexique	Mexico		1953	
31	Fondation de Monaco	Monaco	Julien Médecin	1937	
32	Collège Néerlandais	Netherlands	Willem Marinus Dudok	1926	
33	Maison de Norvège	Norway	Reidar Lund	1954	
34	Maison des Provinces de France	Countryside provinces of France	Armand Guéritte	1933	
35	Residence Quai de la Loire (19th arrondissement of Paris); 48.8879°N 2.3791°E			2007	
36	Residence Robert Garric	Robert Garric		1936	
37	Maison de la Suède	Sweden	Peder Clason, Germain Debré	1931	
38	Pavillon Suisse	Switzerland	Le Corbusier	1930	
39	Maison de la Tunisie	Tunisia	Jean Sebag	1953	
40	Fondation Victor Lyon	Victor Lyon		1950	

== Former residents ==
- Marcos Aguinis (Fondation Argentine)
- Joaquim Pedro de Andrade (Maison du Brésil)
- Azorin (Collège d'Espagne)
- Miguel Angel
- Pol Pot (Indochinese Pavilion, now the Maison de l’Asie du sud-est)
- Fernando Arrabal (Collège d'Espagne)
- Pío Baroja (Collège d'Espagne)
- Raymond Barre
- Steven James Bartlett (Maison du Mexique)
- Manuel Bartlett Díaz (Maison du Mexique)
- Tahar Ben Jelloun (Maison de Norvège)
- Malcolm Bilson (Fondation des États-Unis)
- Estelle Binant (Fondation Deutsch de la Meurthe)
- Karen Blixen (Fondation Danoise)
- Habib Bourguiba
- Josep Puig i Cadafalch (Collège d'Espagne)
- Michel Camdessus
- Cuauhtémoc Cárdenas (Maison du Mexique)
- Américo Castro (Collège d'Espagne)
- Luis Cernuda (Collège d'Espagne)
- Aimé Césaire
- Georges Charpak
- Inger Christensen
- Adrienne Clarkson (Maison des étudiants Canadiens)
- Julio Cortázar (Fondation Argentine)
- Michèle Cotta
- Jean-Louis Curtis
- Fernando del Paso (Maison du Mexique)
- Georges Descrières
- Abdou Diouf (Résidence Lucien Paye)
- Laurent Dispot (Collège Franco-Britannique)
- Jean Dries (Fondation Deutsch de la Meurthe)
- Miguel Angel Estrella (Fondation Argentine)
- Manuel Felguérez (Maison du Mexique)
- Bruno Leonardo Gelber (Fondation Argentine)
- Margo Glantz (Maison du Mexique)
- Claude Guéant (Maison de l'Inde)
- Paul Guth
- Yves Hernot (College Franco-Britannique)
- Bill Hopkins (Collège Franco-Britannique)
- Michel Jobert
- Roméo LeBlanc (Maison des Etudiants Canadiens)
- Jules Léger (Maison des Etudiants Canadiens)
- Jaime Lerner (Maison du Brésil)
- Henri Lopes (Résidence Lucien Paye)
- Neil MacGregor (Collège Franco-Britannique)
- Louis Mermaz
- Patrick Modiano
- Arthur Moreira Lima (Maison du Brésil)
- Porfirio Muñoz Ledo (Maison du Mexique)
- Paul Nizan
- Severo Ochoa (Collège d'Espagne)
- Akram Ojjeh
- Farah Diba Pahlavi (Collège Néerlandais)
- Rajendra Prasad (Maison de l'Inde)
- Francisco Rezek (Maison du Brésil)
- Sebastião Salgado (Maison du Brésil)
- Jacques Santer (Fondation Biermans-Lapôtre)
- Jean-Paul Sartre
- Léopold Sédar Senghor (Fondation Deutsch de la Meurthe)
- Antoni Tàpies (Collège d'Espagne)
- Serge Tchuruk (Maison des Etudiants Arméniens)
- Francisco Toledo (Maison du Mexique)
- Pierre Elliott Trudeau (Maison des Etudiants Canadiens)
- Zuenir Ventura (Maison du Brésil)
- Luc Vinet (Maison des Etudiants Canadiens)
- Narciso Yepes (Collège d'Espagne)

== See also ==
- Marcel Gaumont Sculptor of relief on university entrance
