= Fondation Deutsch de la Meurthe =

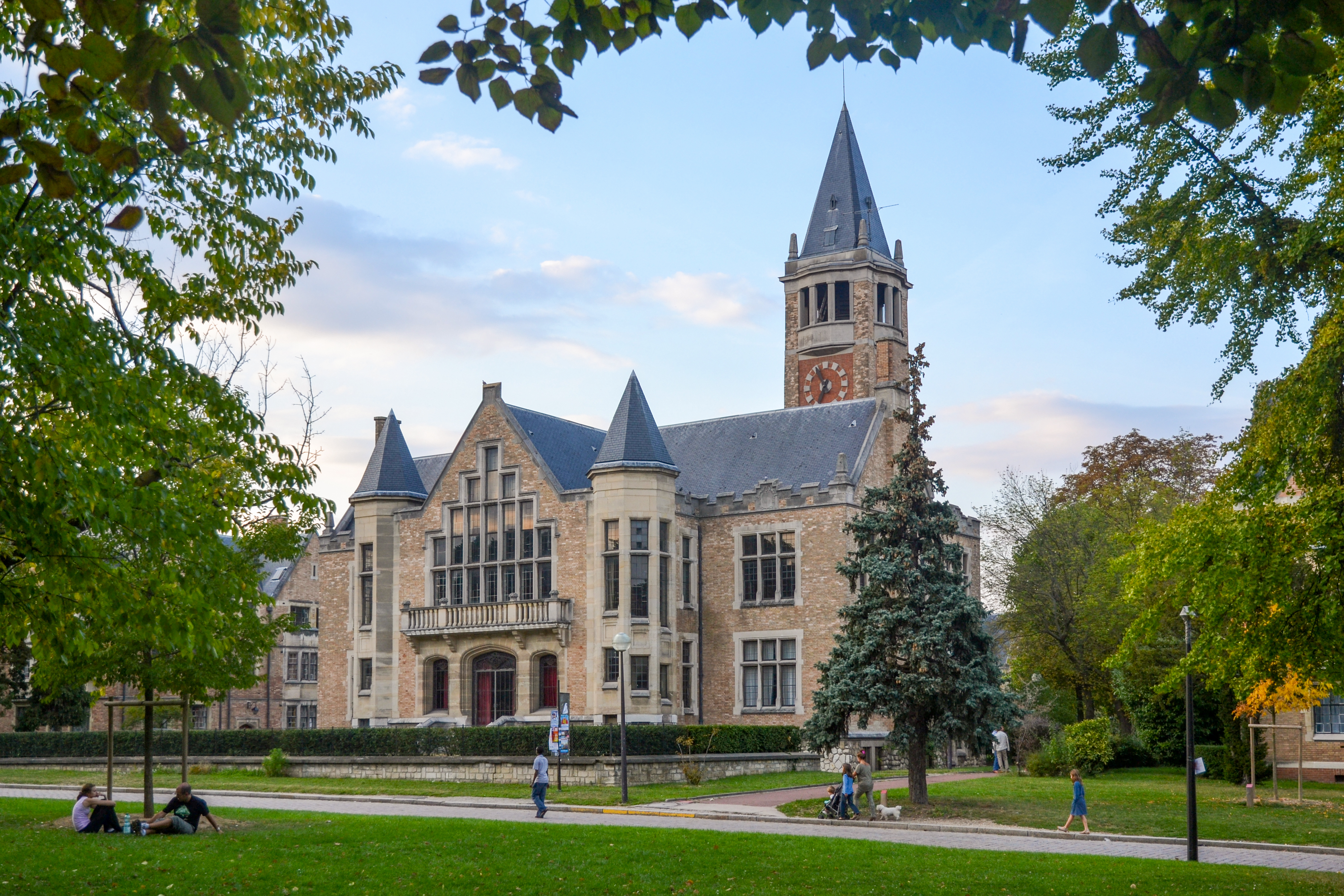
- Established: 1925
- Parent institution: Cité Internationale Universitaire de Paris
- Director: Carlos Rodriguez Lopez
- Students: 393
- Location: 37 Boulevard Jourdan, Paris, 75014, France; 48.820386°N 2.335077°E
- Campus: Urban

The Fondation Émile and Louise Deutsch de la Meurthe is the oldest house in the Cité Internationale Universitaire de Paris. Founded in 1925, it consists of six residential buildings and one central administrative building, which also houses a bell and clock tower. In total there are 393 beds for 341 rooms: 243 single rooms, 27 double rooms, 56 studios, 10 two-room apartments and 5 three-room apartments. Common spaces include 15 shared kitchens, a laundry room, a TV room, and game room with billiards and ping-pong. The central building also contains a great hall, a small lounge, a classroom, and a music room with frescoes painted by Maurice Guy-Loë. The front of the administrative building has an exit gate and is often referred to as the 37 Boulevard Jourdan gate.

== History ==
The Fondation Deutsch de la Meurthe was established following World War I during a meeting between Émile Deutsch de la Meurthe, an industrialist and philanthropist, and Paul Appell, Rector of the University of Paris. An unprecedented housing crisis occurred in Paris in the 1920s, forcing many students to live in cramped and unsanitary conditions. Appell sought to provide better living conditions for students, and Deutsch de la Meurthe was interested in attaching his name to the philanthropic endeavor. A decree signed November 18, 1922 authorized the University of Paris to accept a donation from Émile Deutsch de la Meurthe and named the Fondation in honor of him and his wife, Louise.

The first stone was laid on May 9, 1923, and construction finished in 1925. The buildings were designed by Lucien Bechmann in a style inspired by the architecture of Oxford. Each of the six residential buildings is named after famous scientists and chancellors of the French university: Paul Appell, Pierre and Marie Curie, Octave Gréard, Louis Liard, Louis Pasteur and Raymond Poincaré.

== Renovation and demographics ==
Plan

Initially available to only French students, the Fondation is currently largely international. In 1992, students of 53 nationalities lived there, with 44% of them being French. On May 18, 1998, the roofs of the buildings, the gardens, the paved terraces, the vestibule and the great hall of the central building were included in the French Supplementary Inventory of Historic Monuments. From 2005 to 2006, the Curie building underwent a renovation and now contains studios and apartments reserved for young researchers. The Pasteur building was the second to be renovated. The building reopened in August 2015 after a year of renovation, containing 60 single rooms and 12 double rooms. To restore the original architecture, the 2,800 window tiles of the Pasteur building were replaced using a traditional sealant technique.

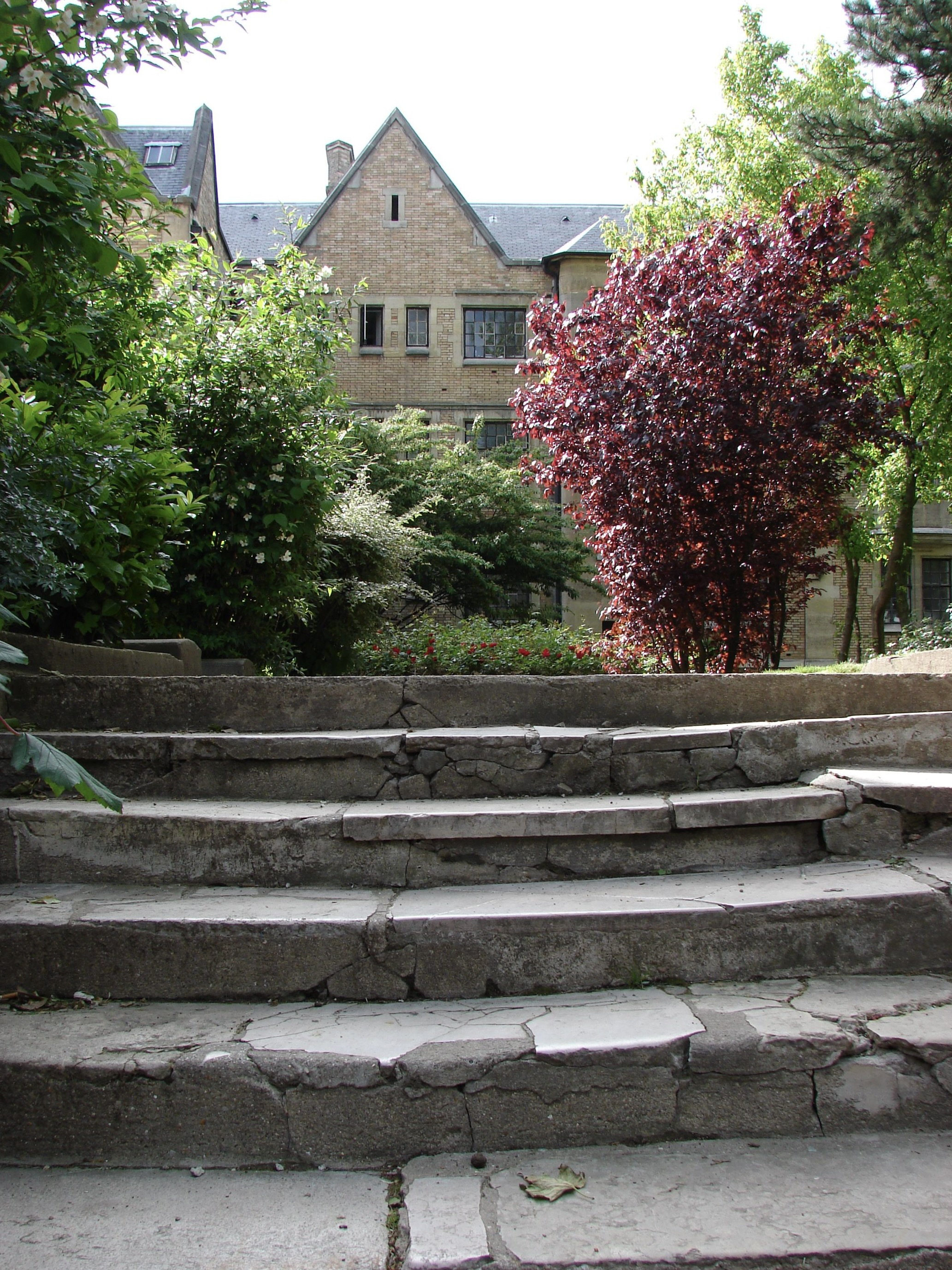
Gréard Residence

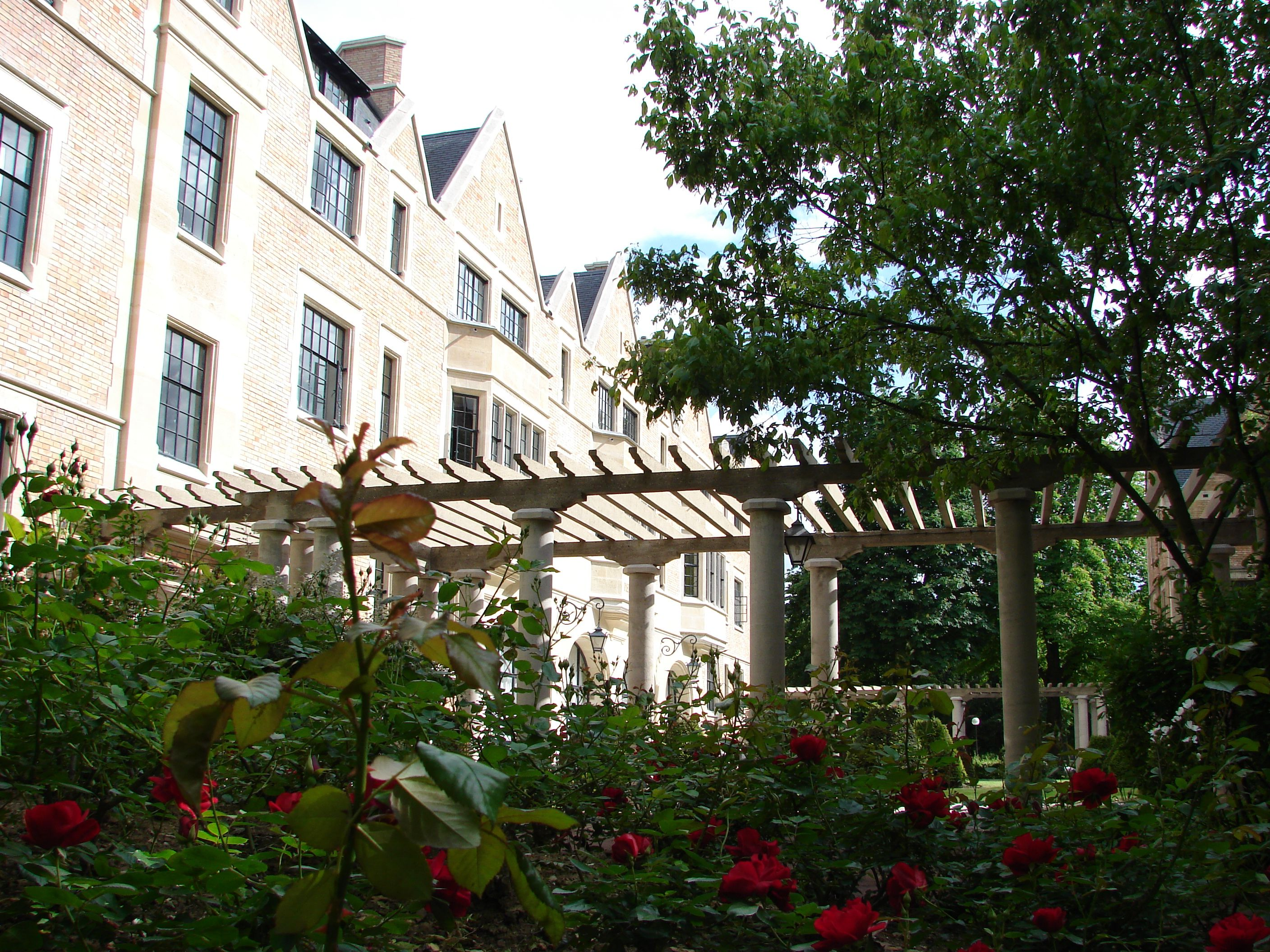
Curie Residence

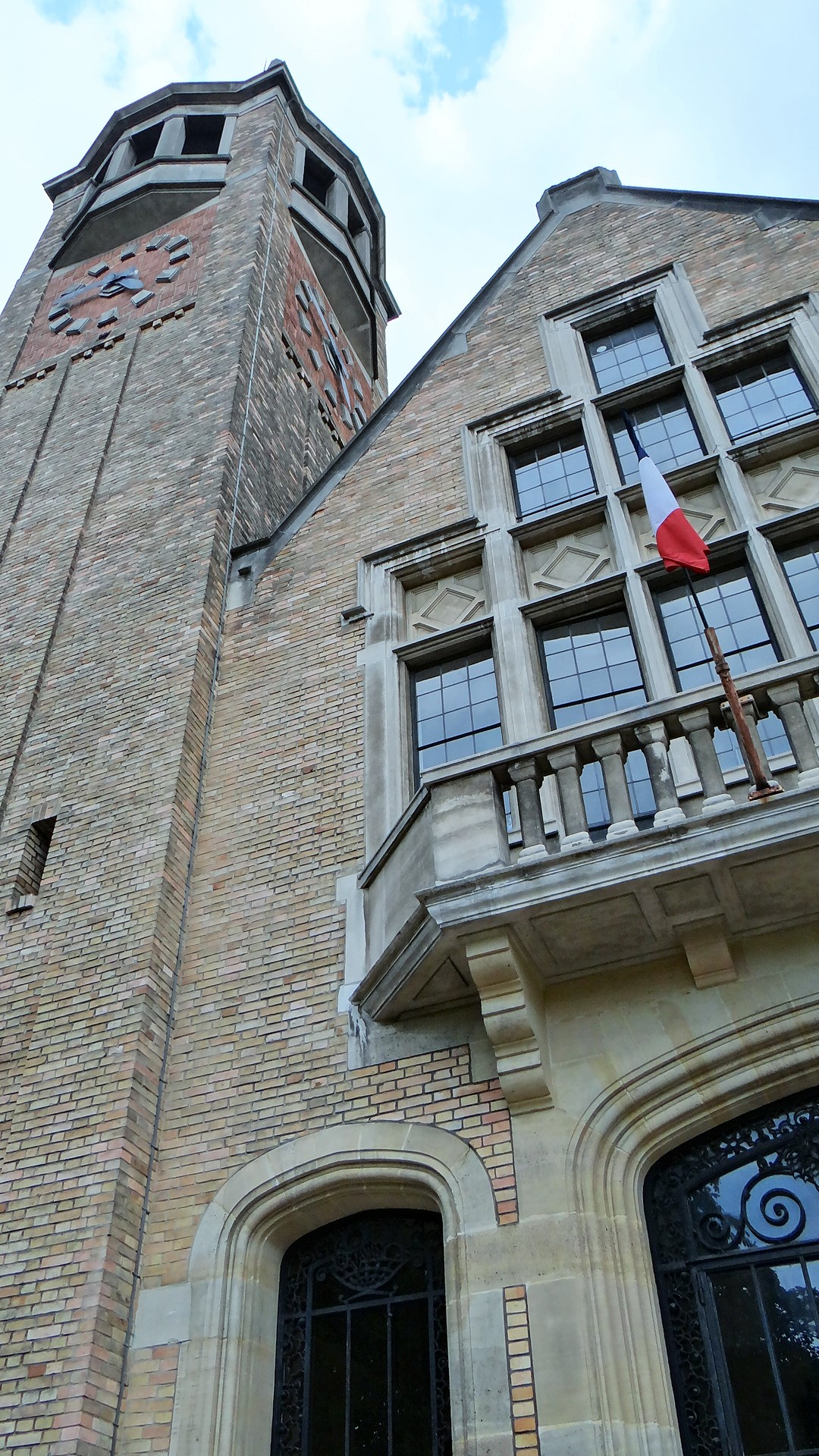
Central Building

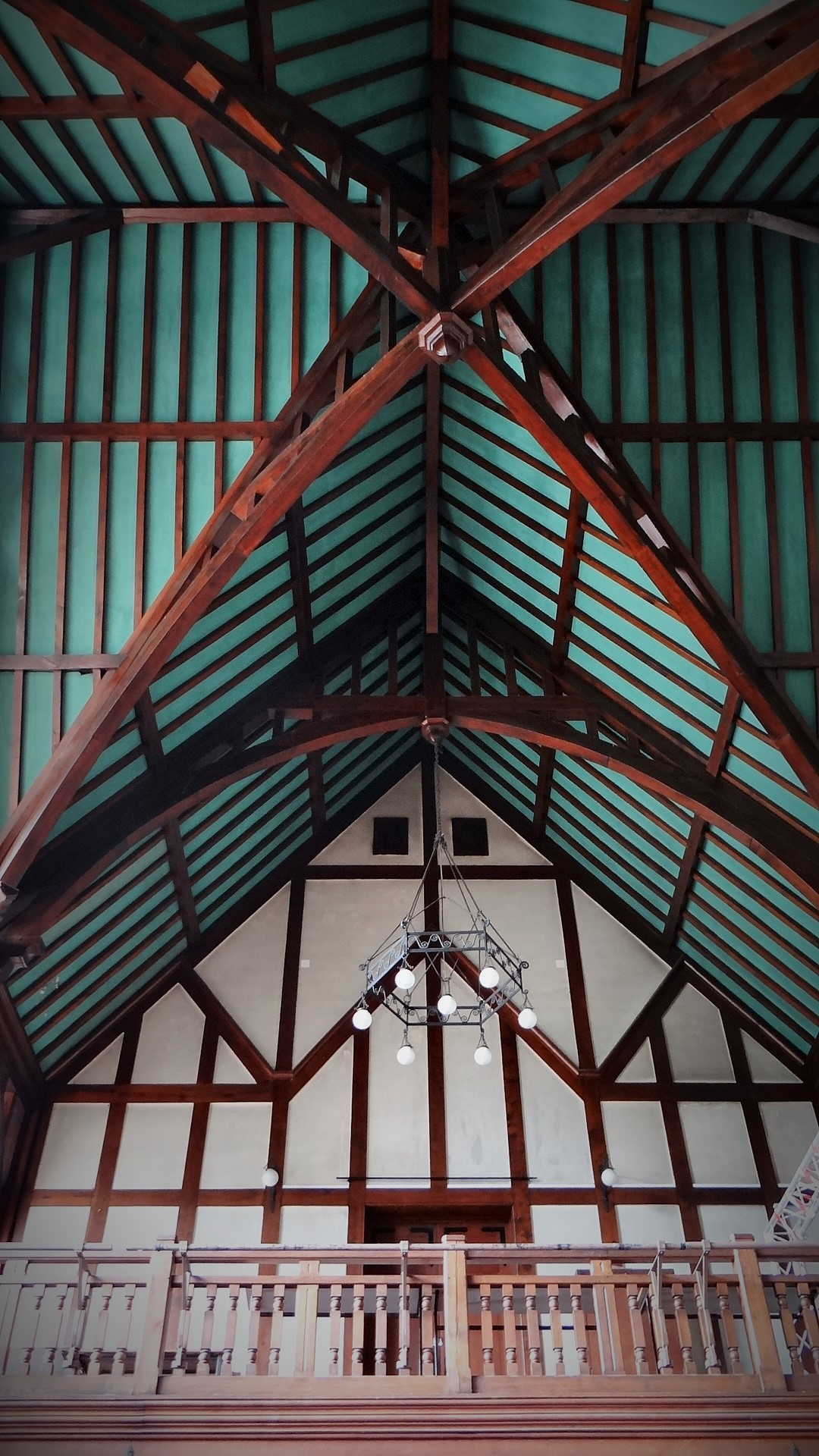
Ceiling of the central building

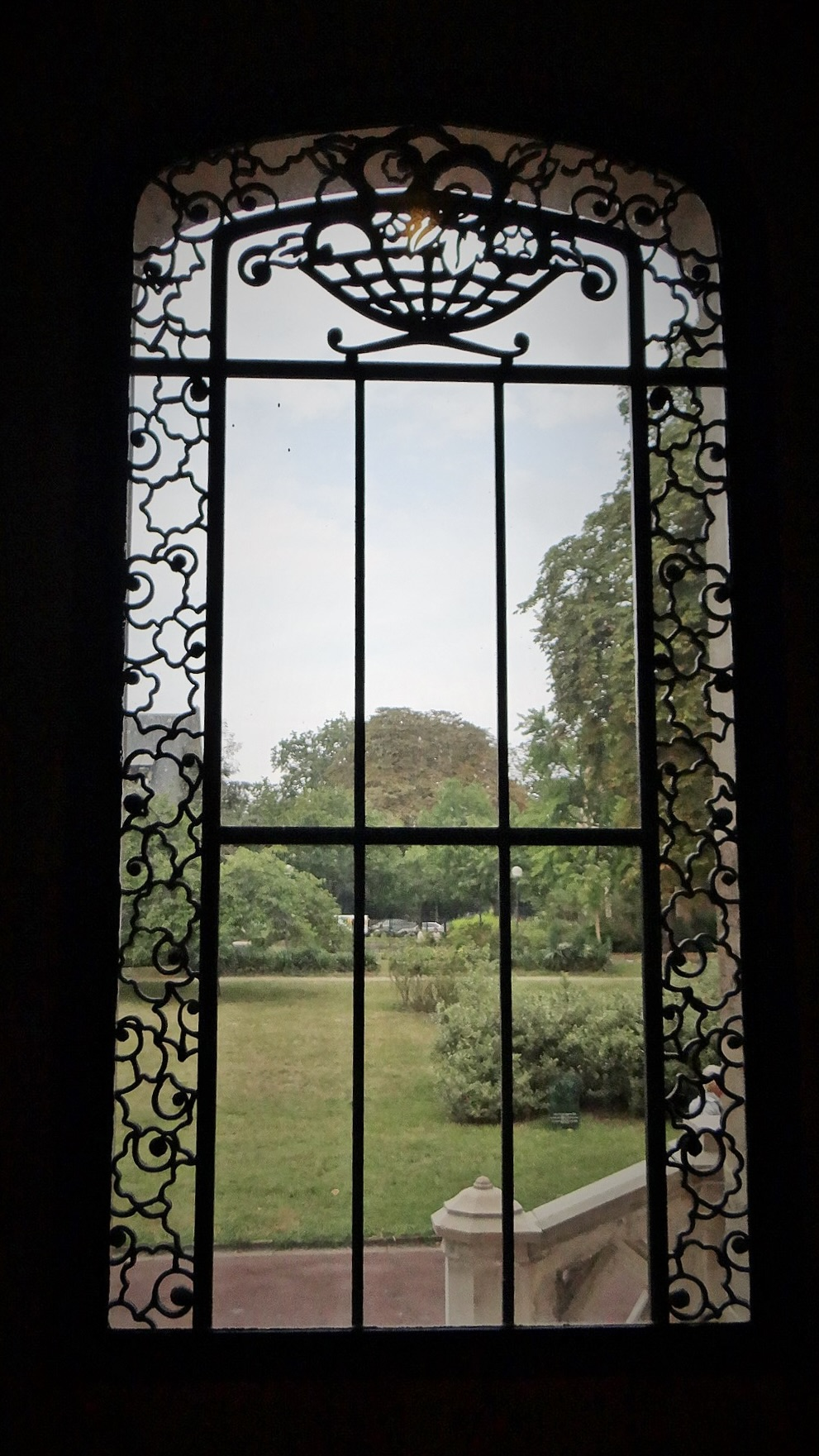
Window of the central building

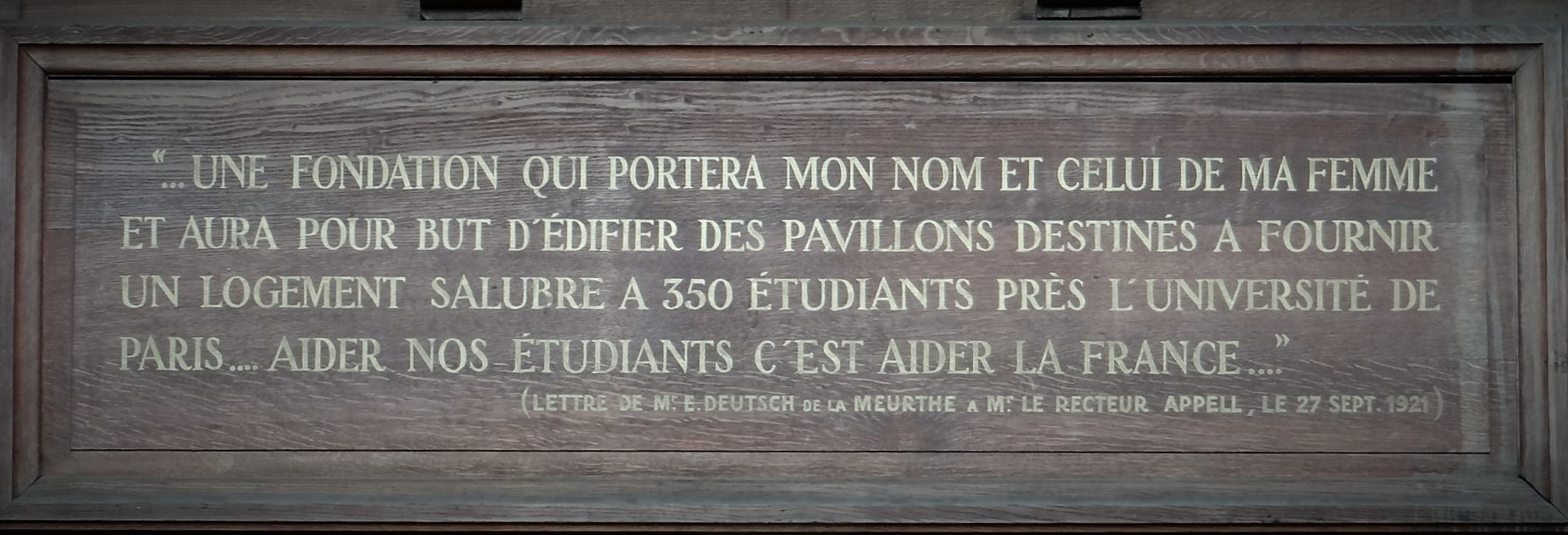
Inscription in the central building

== Notable residents ==
- Jean-Paul Sartre
- Raymond Barre
- Habib Bourguiba (1925–1926)
- Jean Dries (1927–1930)
- Paul Guth (1931–1933)
- Léopold Sédar Senghor (1931–1934)

== See also ==
- Cité Internationale Universitaire de Paris
- Maison du Brésil
- Pavillon Suisse
