= Oliver Hoare =

English art dealer (1948–2018)

- Born: Oliver Reginald Hoare; July 18, 1945; London, England
- Died: 23 August 2018 (aged 73); Provence, France
- Education: Eton College, The Sorbonne, Paris
- Occupation: Art dealer
- Known for: Islamic art specialist
- Spouse: Diane de Waldner de Freundstein (m. 1976)
- Children: 3
- Website: oliverhoareltd.com

Oliver Reginald Hoare (18 July 1945 – 23 August 2018) was an English art dealer, described as arguably the most influential dealer in the Islamic art world.

== Early life and family ==
Hoare was born on 18 July 1945 to Reginald Hoare, a Norfolk landowner, soldier, and official in the British War Office. He was educated at Eton College and then, after travels in Persia, at the Sorbonne in Paris.

== Career ==
In 1967, Hoare joined Christie's auction house in London where he was initially charged with overseeing Russian art. After spotting some carpets left lying in a corridor and recognising them as Persian, Hoare used them as the basis of a successful auction, which led to the launch of the Islamic Art Department, the first of its kind in a major auction house. He left Christie's in 1975 and opened Ahuan, a gallery in Pimlico, in partnership with David Sulzberger.

As a private dealer, Hoare worked with most of the Islamic art collectors and museums throughout the Middle East, as well as in Europe, the US and Japan. In the 1970s and 1980s, he was instrumental in building the collection of Sheikh Nasser Sabah al-Ahmed and his wife Sheikha Hussah Sabah al-Salem al-Sabah, for the Kuwait National Museum, including the acquisition of Islamic art from the legendary collection of Comtesse de Behague.

He advised the Nuhad Es-Said Collection in Beirut, one of the finest groups of Islamic metalwork in private hands, and in the 1990s he started working as an advisor to Sheikh Saud bin Mohammed Al-Thani of Qatar, the greatest collector of his time, as they worked for over a decade on building museum collections for Qatar. The Qatar Museum spent $1 billion on Islamic art during this time. This project came to a halt when the sheikh was placed under house arrest in 2005 amid accusations of financial misappropriation; the charges were later dismissed, but not before Hoare was caught in the confusion.

In 1994, he negotiated the return to Iran of part of a 16th-century Persian manuscript, the Houghton Shahnameh (the most important illustrated manuscript ever created in Persia) in exchange for Willem de Kooning's Woman III which had been in Iran since that country's Islamic revolution. The Shahnama, or "Book of Kings," was a 10th-century verse epic by Persian poet Firdausi chronicling the mythological adventures of Persia's pre-Islamic rulers. At some time around the turn of the 20th century, the Shahnama mysteriously disappeared from Istanbul and in 1903 resurfaced in the possession of Baron Edmond de Rothschild. In 1959, Arthur Houghton Jr. acquired it, and in 1964 he contacted Hoare to sell the manuscript and Hoare negotiated its repatriation to Iran. The objects were exchanged at Vienna airport.

In 2012, Hoare hosted a small exhibition of items from his personal cabinet of curiosities at Jean-Claude Ciancimino's gallery in Pimlico. He returned in 2015 with a much larger edition at 33 Fitzroy Square, former home of the Omega Workshops. Entitled Every Object Tells a Story, it was the first time in decades that he had held a major exhibition and it included an eclectic array of objects ranging from antiquities to dodo bones and erotic scrimshaw. It was accompanied by a catalogue in which he practiced his love of storytelling with entertaining and often semi-autobiographical notes, one of which was to his former friend and client, the late Sheikh Saud al-Thani of Qatar, in which he gave the "other account" of the accusations which had seen the prince placed under house arrest. "The story of this disaster needs to be told, because there are two different versions."

Another exhibition took place in 2017, this time at Sir John Lavery's old studio in Cromwell Place where his choice of objects ranged from unicorn horns to Bactrian treasures. It gave him a chance to tell stories and gave visitors another opportunity to experience Hoare, a private dealer with a very public persona, and an unquenchable thirst for new adventures.

== Personal life ==
In 1976, Hoare married Diane de Waldner de Freundstein, who came from a wealthy French oil family. Diane's mother Baroness Louise de Waldner (née Esmond, a wealthy heiress, granddaughter of Émile Deutsch de la Meurthe and great-granddaughter of David Sassoon), was a close friend of the British Queen Mother. Hoare and his wife had three children: Tristan, Damian and Olivia.

In the 1990s, Hoare had an affair with Diana, Princess of Wales. One night, he was found by a policeman hiding behind a potted tree smoking a cigar after the fire alarm sounded at Kensington Palace, where Diana had her apartment. On another occasion, he was said to have been seen entering the boot of Diana's car.

== Death ==
Hoare died of cancer on 23 August 2018.
