= Honnorat =

Honnorat (English: /ɒnəˈrɑː/, French: [ɔnɔʁa]) is a French surname. Notable people with the surname include:

- André Honnorat (1868–1950), French politician
- Simon-Jude Honnorat (1783–1852), French doctor, natural scientist, and linguist
