= Parsian Esteghlal International Hotel =

Hotel in Tehran, Iran

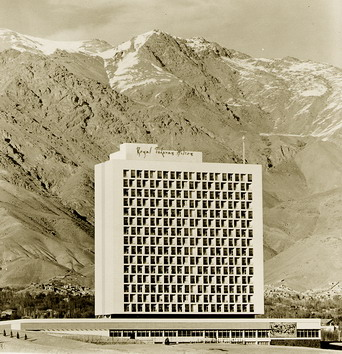
- The Royal Tehran Hilton in 1967
- Interactive map of the Parsian Esteghlal International Hotel area
- Hotel chain: Parsian Hotels

General information
- Location: Tehran, Iran
- Coordinates: 35.7906°N 51.4130°E
- Opening: 1962
- Management: Parsian International Hotels Co.

Technical details
- Floor area: 70,000 m2

Design and construction
- Architect: Heydar Ghiai

Other information
- Number of rooms: 550
- Number of restaurants: 6

Website
- http://esteghlalhotel.ir/

The Parsian Esteghlal International Hotel (Persian: هتل پارسیان استقلال) is a hotel in Tehran, Iran. Opened in 1962 during the Pahlavi era, it was originally called the Royal Tehran Hilton (رویال هیلتون تهران). It was designed by the Iranian architect Heydar Ghiai.

== Overview ==
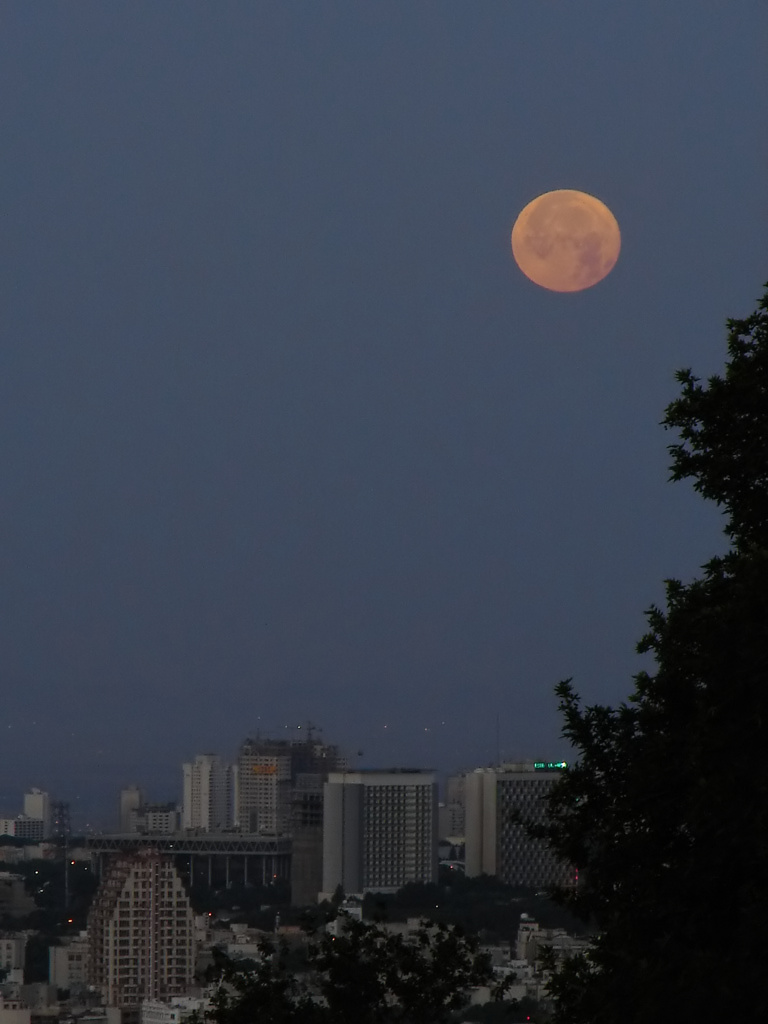
Full moon over the two towers of the Parsian Esteghlal Hotel

The hotel's design consultants also included noted British architect Raglan Squire, who also designed Hilton hotels in Tunis, Bahrain, Nicosia, and Jakarta.

The hotel originally consisted of a single tower containing 259 rooms. An additional tower, with 291 more rooms, was constructed in 1972. The hotel's famous guests during the Pahlavi era included Ethiopian Emperor Haile Selassie, King Hussein of Jordan, and Apollo 11 astronauts Neil Armstrong, Buzz Aldrin, and Michael Collins.

The hotel was renamed the Esteghlal Hotel (meaning "Independence" Hotel in Persian) following the Iranian revolution in 1979, when all foreign hotel management contracts were severed. Today, it is part of the state-run Parsian International Hotels Co. A third tower is currently under construction.

== Building and Construction Facts ==
Unlike its more contemporary twin building, the original white concrete of the first tower was able to retain its colouration due to an innovation by its architect Heydar Ghiai who decided to include particles of crushed white marble into the concrete mix.

== Architect's References ==
- J.I Cohen, M. Eleb & A. Martinelli, "The 20th century Architecture & Urbanism" ; Paris, A+U, 1990, pp. 146–51
- F. Ghiai, " Yady az Heydar Ghiai", Rahavard, No.26, No27, No28, No29, Los Angeles, 1990-91-92-93, pp. 246–52, pp. 233–40
- M. Ghiai, Iran Senate House, Max Gerard Edt. Draeger Paris, 1976 ISBN 2-85119-008-3
- Architecture d'aujourd'hui, No.78, 1958, "Exposition et Hotel à Téhéran", pp. 96–101
- F. Bemont, "Téhéran Contemporain", Art&Architecture, Teheran, No.17, 1973, pp. 85–88
- B. Oudin, Dictionnaire des Architectes, Paris, 1982, p. 187 ISBN 2-221-01090-6
- H. Stierlin, Iran des Batisseurs, "2500 ans d'Architecture", Geneva, 1971, p. 102
- Michel Ragon Histoire de l'architecture et de l'urbanisme modernes, éd.Casterman, Paris, 1986 ISBN 2-02-013290-7
- E. Yarshater, Encyclopædia Iranica, Volume X, New-York, 2001, p. 591-92
- M. Akri, "Iran during the Pahlavi Era, Major political players", London, 1989, p. 392
- R. Ghirshman, Persia El reino immortal, London, 1971, p. 141
- Paris Match, "La Grandeur d'un Règne; le Sénat Iranien", No.1448, Paris, 1977, p. 12
- Teheran Journal, "Downtown's Masterpiece", March 5, 1977, p. 6
- Architecture Méditerranéenne, No 55, "From father to son, a dynasty of builders", Marseille, 2001, pp. 130–60
- Jours de France, "Monde", June 21, 1965, p. 65
- Jean Royere "Decorateur a paris" page 40 p165 edition Norma
- "GĪĀʾĪ, ḤAYDAR – Encyclopaedia Iranica". iranicaonline.org.
