= Heydar Ghiai =

Iranian architect (1922–1985)

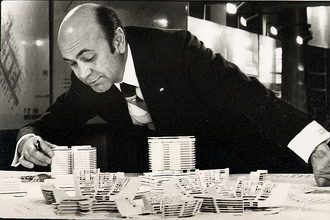
- Ghiai in 1977
- Born: Heydar-Gholi Khan Ghiaï-Chamlou; 23 October 1922; Tehran, Qajar Iran
- Died: 6 September 1985 (aged 62); Cap d'Antibes, France
- Occupations: Architect, university professor
- Buildings: Senate House of Iran; Royal Tehran Hilton Hotel; Fondation Avicenne

Heydar-Gholi Khan Ghiaï-Chamlou (Persian: حیدرقلی خان غیایی شاملو; 23 October 1922 – 6 September 1985) was an Iranian architect and university professor. He was an early figure in Iran's modern architectural movement and taught architecture at the University of Tehran. His best-known commission was the Senate House of Iran, designed jointly with Mohsen Foroughi.

== Education and teaching ==
Ghiai studied architecture at the Faculty of Fine Arts of the University of Tehran before continuing his education at the École des Beaux-Arts in Paris from 1948 to 1953. He returned to Iran in 1954 and joined the Faculty of Fine Arts as a teacher, where he helped educate a new generation of Iranian architects.

His work drew on contemporary European modernism and the International Style, including the use of newer construction technologies and materials such as aluminium. His private commissions in and around Tehran included the German Embassy, the Carlton and Hilton hotels, the Moulin Rouge and Radio City cinemas, the Tehran Pars Casino and drive-in theatre, and several houses and apartment buildings.

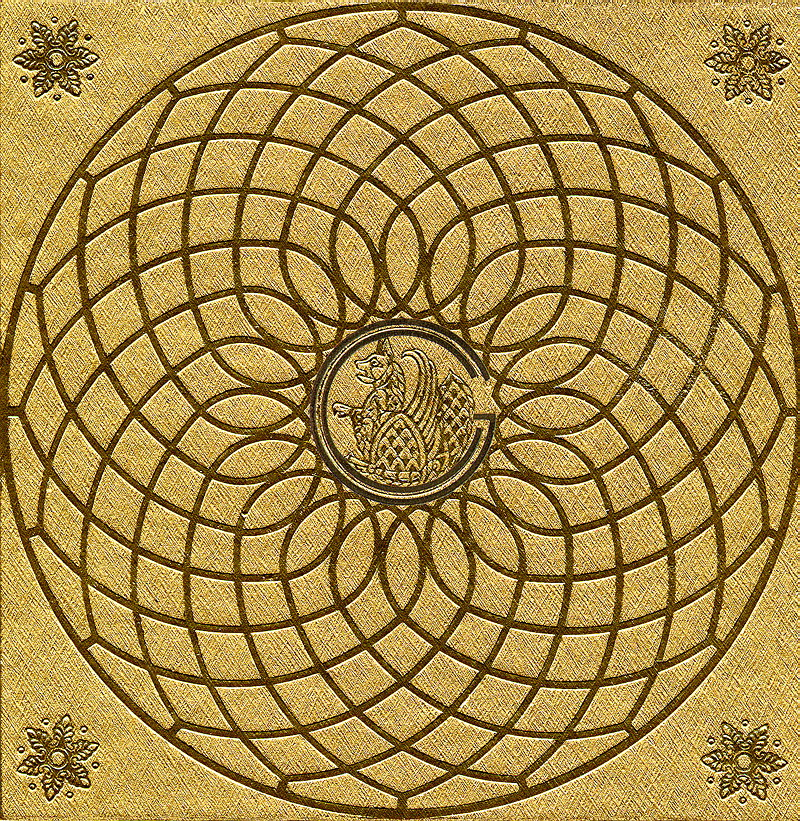
The Ghiaï-Chamlou coat of arms

Ghiai with Mohammad Reza Pahlavi in 1963

Ghiai in 1973

== Architectural career ==
Ghiai's first government commission was the Senate building in Tehran, designed with Mohsen Foroughi between 1954 and 1959. The building has a freestanding marble-grid façade framed by two 25-metre bronze columns created by French architect and sculptor André Bloc. The columns take the form of enlarged interlocking chains. Contemporary architectural literature also documented the Senate building as one of Ghiai's principal works.

His other public commissions included the Ministry of Water and Electricity building, completed in 1959; the Palace of Fine Arts, completed in 1960; Mashhad Hospital, completed in 1963; and the Ministry of Agriculture building, completed in 1970. He was also responsible for hospital projects in Lavizan, Ahvaz and Isfahan that remained under construction at the time of the Iranian Revolution.

In 1968, Ghiai was appointed architect to the imperial court. He worked on plans for a palace complex at Farahabad, although the proposal did not receive the approval of Iran's Plan and Budget Organization.

== Maison de l'Iran ==
Outside Iran, Ghiai and Foroughi collaborated with André Bloc and French architect Claude Parent on the Maison de l'Iran, a student residence at the Cité internationale universitaire de Paris. Ghiai and Foroughi had prepared an earlier proposal for the building, but after it was not approved by the Paris authorities, Bloc introduced the architects to Parent. The collaborative design was completed in 1969.

The Fondation Avicenne, formerly the Maison de l'Iran, seen from Boulevard Romain-Rolland

The residence was created to provide approximately 100 rooms for Iranian students. Its residential floors are suspended from a macrostructure formed by three welded-steel frames about 38 metres high. A large external steel staircase was designed as a separate sculptural feature. The building was transferred to the Cité internationale and renamed the Fondation Avicenne in 1972. It was placed on France's list of historic monuments in 2008.

== Death ==
Ghiai later lived in France. He died on 6 September 1985 in Cap d'Antibes, aged 62.

== Selected works ==
The following selection is based primarily on the documented project list published by Encyclopaedia Iranica.

- Senate House of Iran, Tehran, 1954–1959, with Mohsen Foroughi
- Ministry of Water and Electricity building, Tehran, 1959
- Palace of Fine Arts, Tehran, 1960
- Mashhad Hospital, 1963
- Maison de l'Iran, Paris, completed 1969, with Mohsen Foroughi, Claude Parent and André Bloc
- Ministry of Agriculture building, Tehran, 1970
- German Embassy, Tehran
- Royal Tehran Hilton Hotel
- Moulin Rouge cinema
- Cinema Radio City
- Tehran Pars Casino and drive-in theatre

== Gallery ==
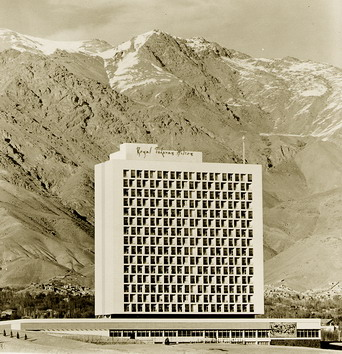
Royal Hilton Hotel, Tehran

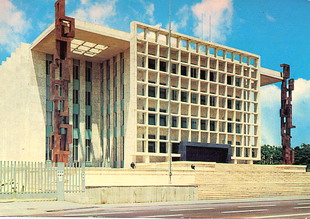
Senate House, Tehran

Ghiai Mansion, Tehran

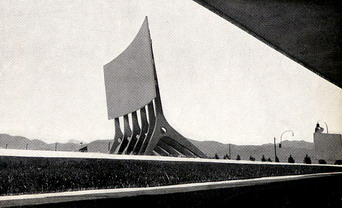
Tehran Pars drive-in theatre

Model of Lavizan Military Hospital

Model of Casino Tehran Pars

Model of Mashhad University Hospital

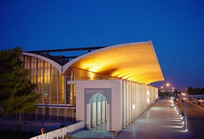
Mashhad railway station

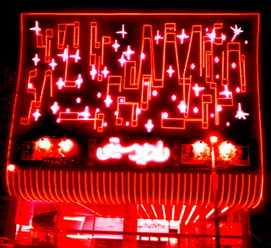
Cinema Radio City, Tehran

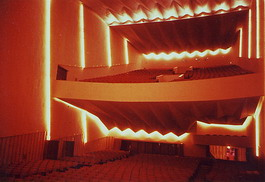
Interior of Cinema Radio City

Model for the Farahabad palace project

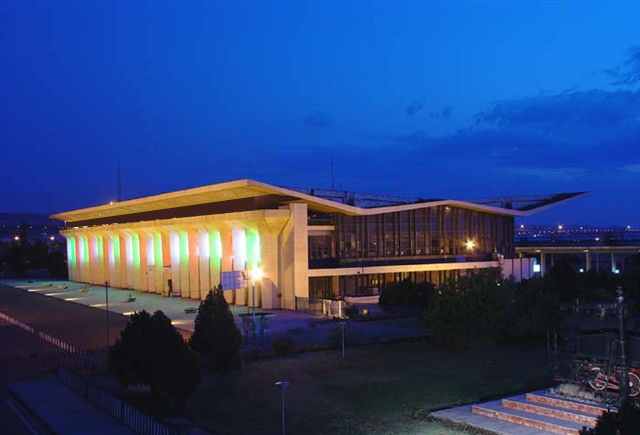
Tabriz railway station

Villa Nautica, Tehran

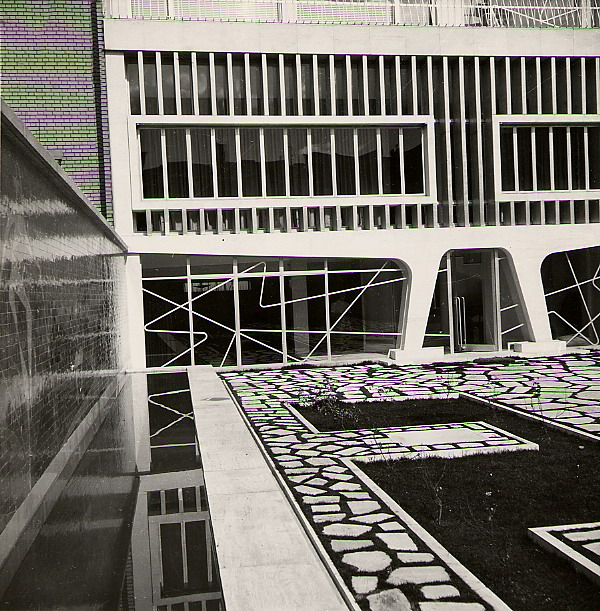
Swan Lake Villa, Tehran

Villa Oceania, Tehran
