= Claude Parent =

French architect

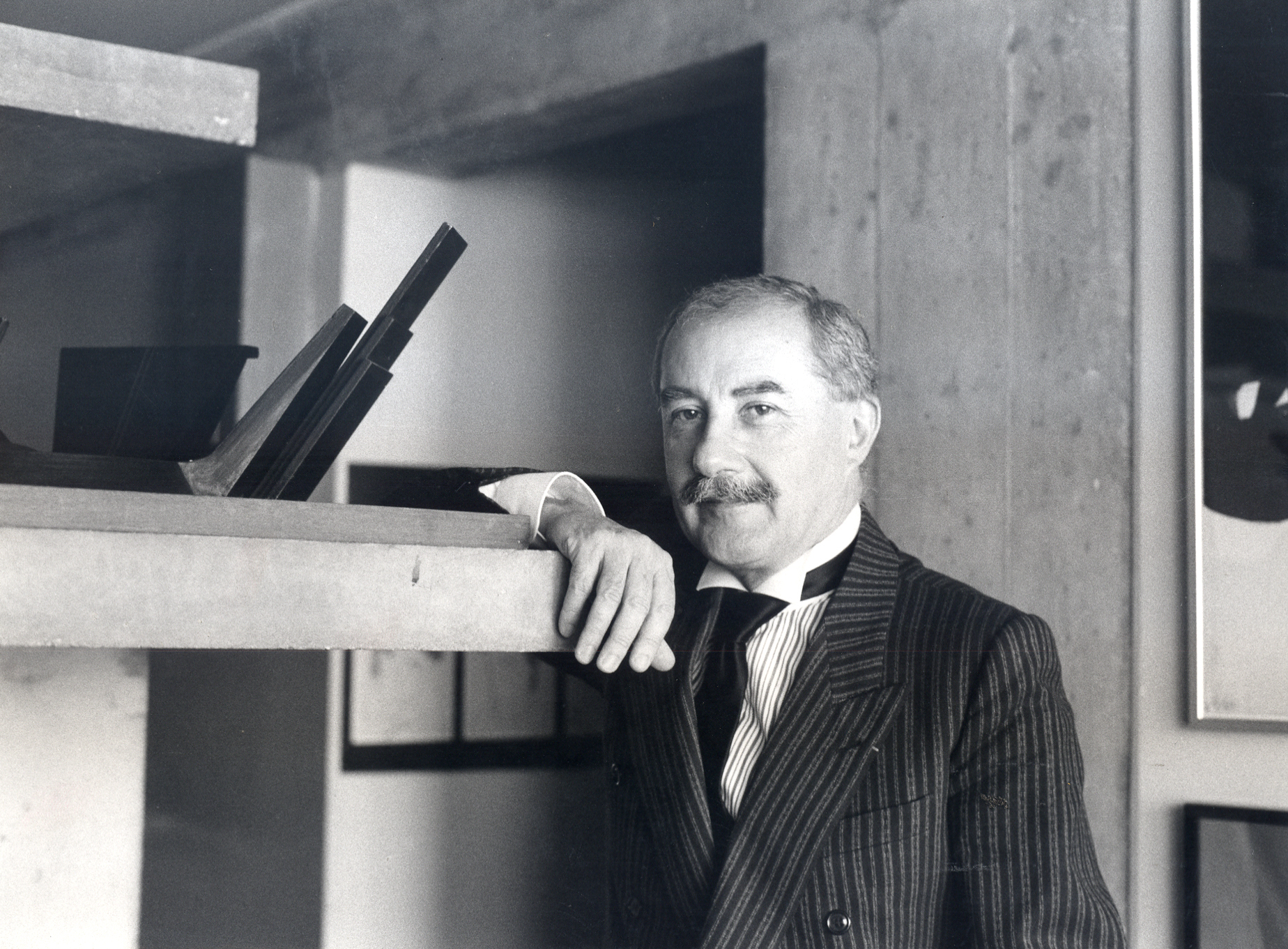
- Born: 26 February 1923; Neuilly-sur-Seine, France
- Died: 27 February 2016 (aged 93); Neuilly-sur-Seine, France
- Education: École nationale supérieure des Beaux-Arts, École nationale supérieure des Beaux-Arts
- Occupation: Architect
- Practice: Claude Parent Architecte (1956–04); Groupe Architecture Principe (1963–68)

Claude Parent (French: [klod paʁɑ̃]; 26 February 1923 – 27 February 2016) was a French architect.

== Biography ==
Claude Parent was a French architect, polemicist, and architectural theoretician, widely regarded as the first figure in France to make a decisive break with modernism, beginning in the mid-1950s. Through articles, books, manifesto drawings, and built projects, he sought to challenge prevailing conceptions of space. From the Maison Drusch (1963) to his collaboration with Loris Gréaud on "Workshop" (2015), his work pursued discontinuity through shifted and tilted volumes and fragmented floor plans.

Largely self-taught, Parent began his career working with Ionel Schein, with whom he worked until 1955. He also participated in the Espace group, founded in 1951 by artists André Bloc and Félix del Marle. His encounter with philosopher Paul Virilio led to the formation of the Architecture Principe group (1963–68) and the development of the oblique function, a spatial theory based on the continuity of the inclined plane. This collaboration produced the Église Sainte-Bernadette-du-Banlay in Nevers (1966).

Parent also designed several superstores in béton brut (or "raw concrete") in Ris Orangis (1969) and Sens (1970), among others. In 1974, a few months after the oil crisis, EDF (France's production and distribution power company), Parent, 47, is entrusted with the coordination of a group of architects including, among others Paul Andreu, Jean Willerval and Roger Taillibert. For the next 10 years he leads the group to redesign nuclear power plants and find ways to better integrate them in the landscape. Commissions from the public sector for the French Education Department, the Regional Council of Provence Alpes Côte d’Azur in Marseille (1991), the Charles de Gaulle airport exchange center (1995), the French Pavilion facade at the Venice Biennale of Architecture (1996) or the oblique installation designed for the Wolfson Gallery during the TATE Liverpool 2014 biennal are all expressions of his quest for disequilibrium, movement and fluidity in architecture. His last building is the "Workshop", for and with artist Loris Gréaud, in 2015–16, just before his death. Demanding, critical, provocative and fiercely obstinate, Claude Parent has continuously proposed places of contradiction generating doubt and disquiet and excluding any sort of passiveness with regard to architecture.

Though destined for a career as an engineer in the field of aeronautics, Claude Parent enrolled in the École Nationale Supérieure des Beaux-Arts of Toulouse in 1943 in the architecture studio, and then in 1946 in the École Nationale Supérieure des Beaux-Arts of Paris. He left before obtaining his diploma in architecture, and later founded his own firm in 1956, but was only recognized by and admitted to the Order of Architects in 1966, based on his experience. An Academician, Claude Parent is a Commander of the French Legion of Honor, a Commander of Arts and Letters, Officer of the Palmes Académiques and a Commander of the National Order of Merit. Prizes stand as milestones marking his entire career: National Grand Prize of Architecture (1979), the silver medal of the Academy of Architecture, the medal of the Central Union of the Decorative Arts, the gold medal of the Society for the Encouragement of Progress and the medal of the U.I.A for his work in criticism. In 1994, Architecture critic and curator Fréderic Migayrou celebrates Claude Parent's essential contribution and unique place in post WWII architecture, and many leading architects such as Jean Nouvel, Frank Gehry, Thom Mayne, Zaha Hadid recognize him as both a precursor and an influence. In 2010, a retrospective exhibition at the Cité de l’Architecture et du Patrimoine was dedicated to this major figure in the history of 20th-century architecture.

== Important built works ==
- Maison G (maison Gosselin) with Ionel Schein, Ville d'Avray, France (1952)
- Maison Perdrizet, Champigny sur Marne, France (1955-1957)
- Maison Soultrait, Domont (1956-1958)
- Villa André Bloc, Antibes, France (1959-1962)
- Avicenna Foundation (formerly House of Iran, Cité internationale universitaire de Paris), with André Bloc, Mohsen Foroughi and Heydar Ghiai), Paris, France (1959-1969)
- Maison Mauriange, Meudon (1960-1964)
- Drusch House, Versailles, France (1963-1965)
- Bordeaux-le-Pecq House, Bois-le-Roi, France (1963-1965)
- Sainte-Bernadette du Banlay Church (with Paul Virilio, Architecture Principe), Nevers, France (1963-1966)
- Oblique apartment for painter Andrée Bellaguet (1970-1971)
- Claude Parent's oblique home (1973-1975)
- Shopping Center in Sens, France (1967-1971)
- Shopping Center in Ris-Orangis, France (1967-1971)
- Shopping Center in Reims-Tinqueux, France (1968-1971)
- French pavilion for the 35th Venice Biennale, Italy (1970)
- Social Security's office building, with André Remondet, Paris, France (1971-1975)
- Septen, building for EDF's studies of thermal and nuclear projects, Villeurbanne, France (1981-1984)
- Vincent d'Indy High School, Paris, France (1985-1987)
- Silvia Monfort Theater, Paris, France (1984-1991)
- Hôtel de Région, Marseille, France (1987-1991)
- L'Aeronef, Roissypôle exchange center, Charles de Gaulle Airport, Roissy, France (1989-1996)
- Cap Ampère office building for EDF, Saint-Denis, France (1991-1996)
- Myslbek office building, Prague, Czech Republic (1991-1996)
- Lillebonne City Hall, France (1993-1998)
- French pavilion facade for the Venice Biennale, Italy (1996)
- Hill of Art pavilion for the Wolfson Gallery at the Tate Liverpool, UK (2014)
- "Workshop" (studio of French artist Loris Gréaud), France (2016- completed in 2024)

== Important publications ==
- 9 issues of the Architecture Principe manifesto (by claude Parent and Paul Virilio, self-published, 1966)
- Vivre à l'Oblique (by Claude Parent, published by l'aventure urbaine,1970)
- Claude Parent, Architecte (by Claude Parent, published by Robert Laffont, 1975)
- Les Entrelacs de l'Oblique (by Claude Parent, published by Éditions du Moniteur, 1981)
- Claude Parent, monographie critique d'un architecte (by Michel Ragon, published by Dunod, 1992)
- Architecture Principe, by Claude Parent and Paul Virilio (1966 & 1996) - published by Les Éditions de l'imprimeur, 1996)
- The Function of the Oblique: The Architecture of Claude Parent and Paul Virilio from 1963-1969 (published by AA Association, 1996)
- Claude Parent vu par...(collective, published by Édition le Moniteur, 2006)
- Claude Parent: l'œuvre construite, l'œuvre graphique (monograph, collective, published by HYX, 2010)
- Demain, La Terre... (by Claude Parent, published by Manuella Éditions, 2010)
- Nevers - Architecture Principe (collective, published by HYX, 2010)
- La Villa Bloc de Claude Parent (by Jean-Lucien Bonillo, published by Imbernon, 2013)
- Yves Klein & Claude Parent: The Memorial, an Architectural Project (published by Dilecta, 2013)
- Claude Parent special issue of Do.co.mo.mo, (collective, published by Docomomo, 2017)
- Claude Parent - Visionary Architect (collective, published by Rizzoli NY, 2019)
- Claude Parent, les desseins d'un architecte (by Audrey Jeanroy, published by Parenthèse, 2021)
- Errer dans l'Illusion (by Claude Parent, 2023 re-edition of the 2001 book, published by Bernard Chauveau)
- Vivre à l'Oblique (by Claude Parent, 2023 re-edition of the 1970 book, published by Bernard Chauveau)
- Oblique Experiments: Claude Parent’s Architectural Installations, 1969–1975 (by Igor Siddiqui, 2025)

== Awards and decorations ==
Awards

- Grand prix national de l’architecture (France, 1979)
- Silver medal of l’Académie d’Architecture
- Medal of l’Union des Arts Décoratifs
- Gold medal of the Société d’Encouragement au Progrès
- Medal of International Union of Architects

Decorations

- Commander of the National Order of Merit (France)
- Commander of l'Ordre des Arts et des Lettres
- Commander of the Legion of Honour
- Officer of l'Ordre des Palmes Académiques
- Member of the Académie des Beaux-Arts (Architecture) (2005)

== External links/official sites ==
claudeparent.fr

prixclaudeparent.org

Claude Parent's official Instagram account

FRAC centre-Val de Loire

Cité de l'Architecture et du Patrimoine

Bibliothèque Kandinsky (Pompidou Center)
