= Soroush Cinema =

Cinema in Tehran, Iran

Coordinates: 35°42′33.8148″N 51°26′9.6252″E

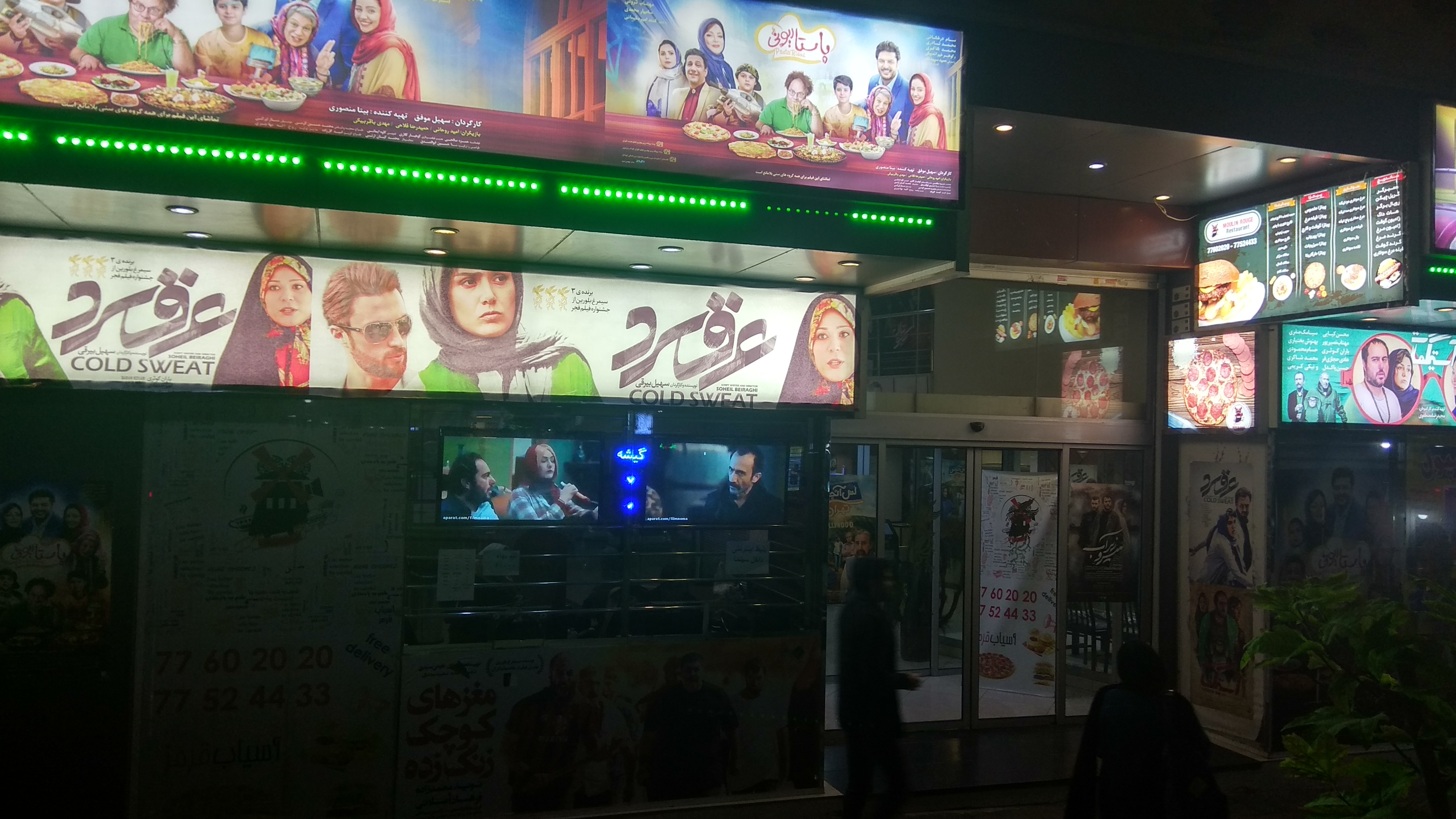
Tehran Soroush Cinema

Soroush Cinema (Persian: سینما سروش), formerly known as Moulin Rouge Cinema (سینما مولن روژ), is one of Tehran's old cinemas which opened on 15 October 1956. The first movie showed in this cinema was Trapeze. Moulin Rouge cinema was designed by Heydar Ghiai, a pioneer of modern architecture in Iran.

The Chain Cinemas of Moulin Rouge included eight cinemas which were founded by Akhavan brothers in 1955. These cinemas were named Mahtab, Berelian, Zohre, Crystal, and Moulin Rouge. They showed movies from Paramount Pictures and United Artists studios. This cinema is located at Shariati Street. It was closed for a short time due to renovations and opened again in August 2013. The first movie shown in this cinema after renovation was Shahr-e Moush-ha 2. The new Cinema Soroush has three saloons with a capacity of 330, 200, and 100 person each.
