= Cambodia House =

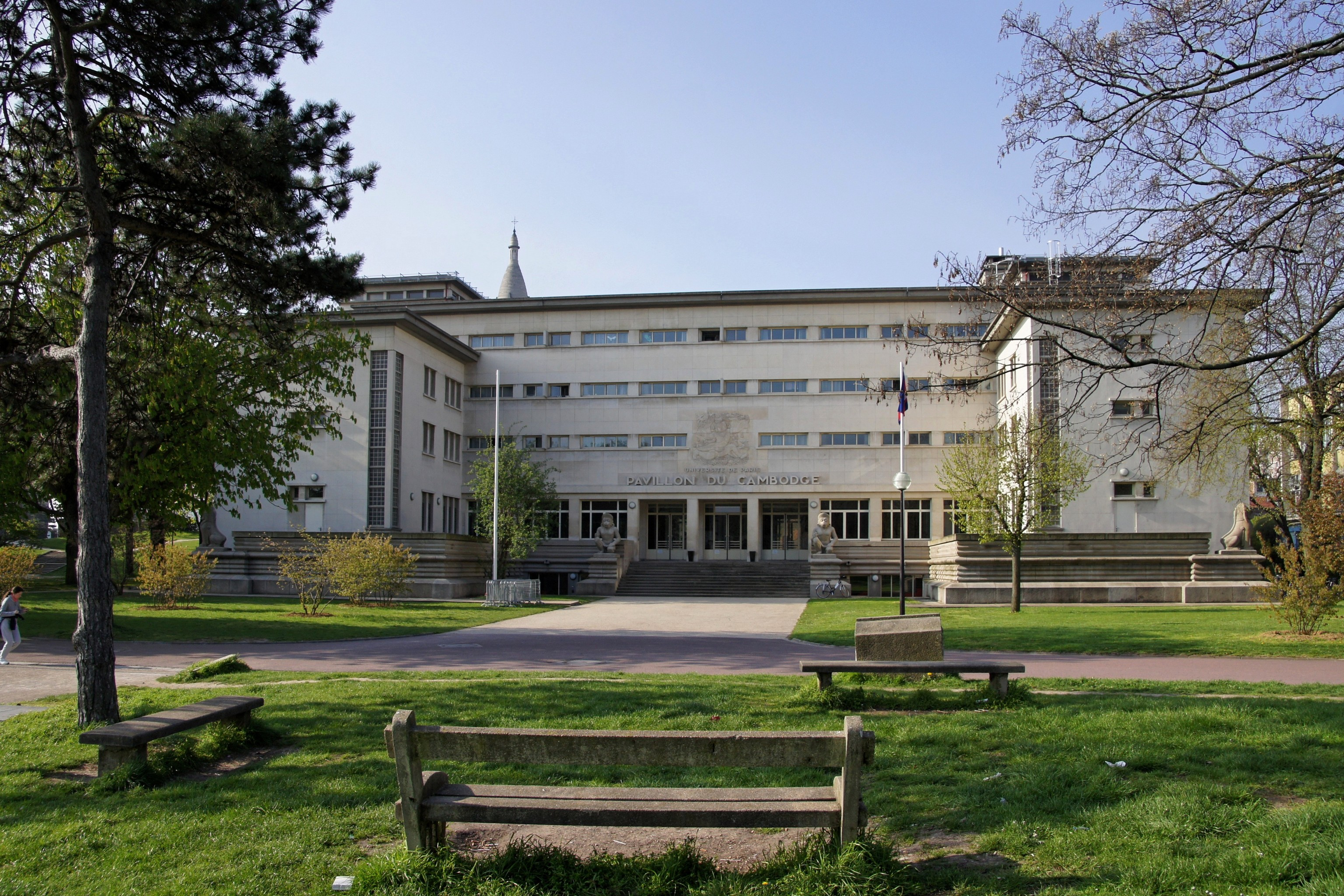
- Interactive map of the Cambodia House area
- Alternative names: Maison du Cambodge

General information
- Inaugurated: 1957
- Renovated: 2011

Design and construction
- Architect: Alfred Audoul

Cambodia House (French: Maison du Cambodge) is a student housing and cultural center located in the Cité internationale universitaire de Paris, in the 14th arrondissement. The center was built by French architect Alfred Audoul in the neoclassical style; it is ornamented with Khmer decorative elements. The Cambodia House was inaugurated in 1957, four years after Cambodia's independence.

In the 1970s, the center was the scene of tensions and clashes in the aftermath of the 1970 Cambodian coup d'état, and the establishment of the Khmer Republic. The Cambodia House was shut down for 30 years following the death of one of its residents in 1973. After major work carried out in the early 2000s, it has reopened for new students in 2004.

== History ==
The project of the Cambodia House was first mentioned in 1948, by King of Cambodia Norodom Sihanouk during an official trip to Paris. The project was formalized two years later by the Cambodian government and obtained the support of the High Commissioner of France in Indochina.

The Cambodia House was inaugurated on October 24, 1957, four years after Cambodia's independence, in the presence of then-French President René Coty and King Norodom Sihanouk. The house, which is open to French and foreign students, mainly welcomes Khmer students (85% of residents).

In the 1970s, the civil war in Cambodia caused strong tensions among the Cambodian students. On May 4, 1970, a student supporter of Prince Sihanouk was injured with a bottle. The next day, a Lebanese student was injured by a Cambodian student with a sword blow. On September 7 of the same year, three residents of the House of Cambodia were hospitalized.

On March 18, 1971, students supporters of the Phnom-Penh regime fired "with a rifle" or "with a slingshot" - depending on the versions - to "protect" a meeting celebrating the first anniversary of the 1970 coup. Four residents of the University City, including an English national, were injured.

The situation deteriorated at the start of the school year 1972–1973, with the arrival of highly politicized students supporting Prince Sihanouk. On January 7, clashes broke out between the administration of the House, supporters of the new Cambodian regime of Lon Nol, and students who were supporters of the National United Front of Kampuchea. The police intervened in the evening and arrested 27 students. However, violent clashes continued throughout the night, and ended with the death of a 24-year-old Cambodian student. As a result of these events, the Cambodia House was closed for more than 30 years.

In April 2001, a memorandum of understanding was signed between the Kingdom of Cambodia, the Chancellery of Universities of Paris and the Cité internationale for the restoration of the Cambodia House. The House reopened its doors in 2004 after major work. 175 students were welcomed during the winter of 2004.

== Architecture ==
The design of the Cambodia House was assigned to the French architect Alfred Audoul. The building has both the distinctive features of the neoclassical architecture of the 1950s while adopting many Khmer decorative elements. Its foundations are striated with horizontal stripes, and evoke the temples of Angkor and two granite monkey sculptures at the entrance to the House represent the Hindu god Hanumān.
