= Maison Heinrich Heine =

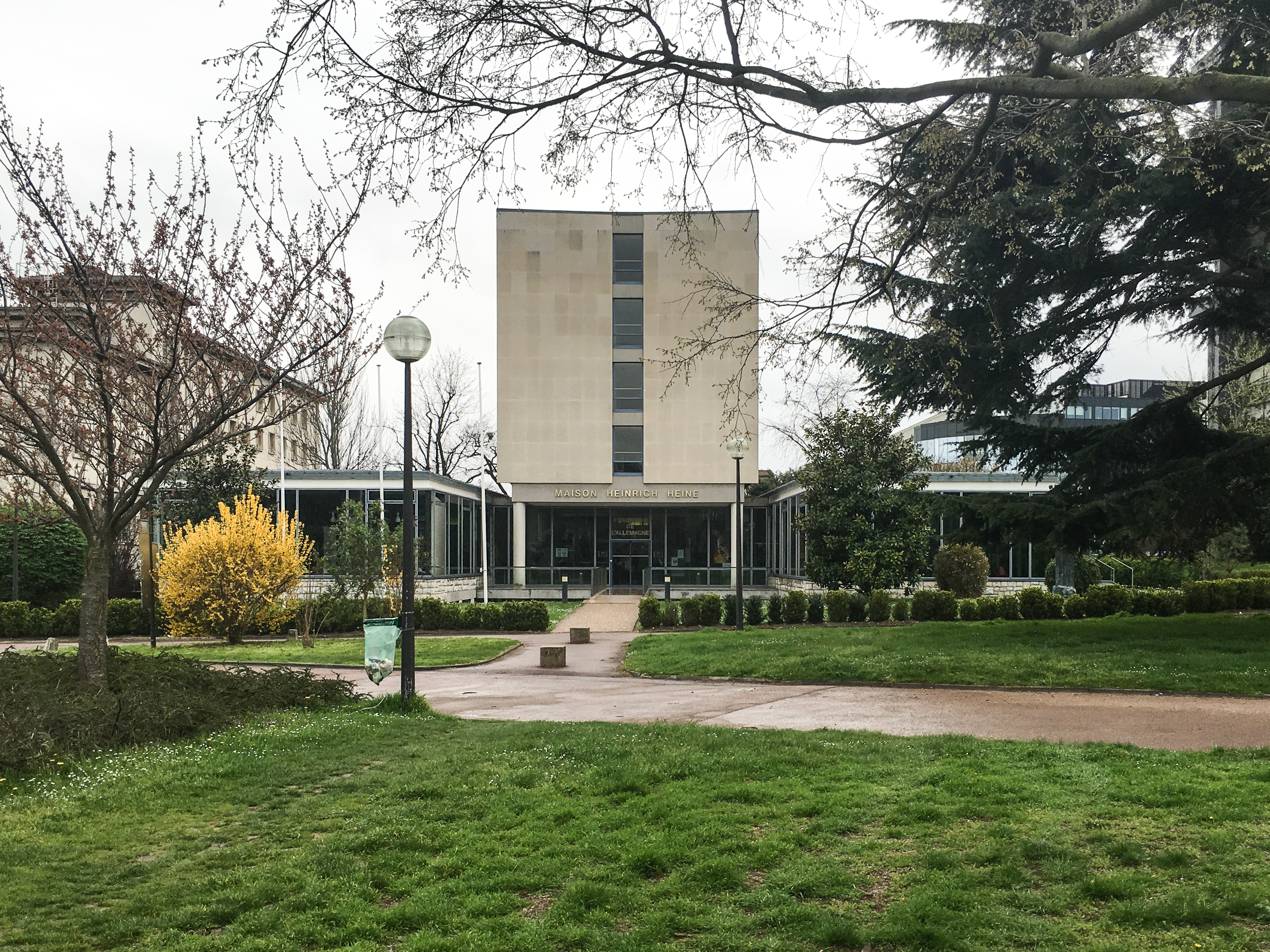
- Front of the Maison Heinrich Heine

General information
- Location: France
- Address: 27 C Boulevard Jourdan, 75014 Paris
- Coordinates: 48°49′3.53″N 2°20′8.53″E
- Completed: 1956
- Owner: Cité Universitaire

Design and construction
- Architect(s): Johannes Krahn

Fondation de l'Allemagne — Maison Heinrich Heine is a cultural center and student hostel building located in the Cité Universitaire complex in Paris, France. It was designed by Johannes Krahn and opened in 1956.

== Function ==
The Maison Heinrich Heine has an event hall, a library and more than 100 dormitory places intended for German students and doctoral candidates. Through the principle of brassage (en: Shared Values), the Maison Heinrich Heine is inhabited by around half German and non-German students, which is intended to promote exchange between different nationalities.

== Cultural program ==
The Maison Heinrich Heine has set itself the goal of promoting German-French cooperation in science, politics, art and culture and deepening dialogue in a European and international context.

The event program includes poetry readings, exhibitions, concerts, lectures, panel discussions and discussion events with mostly well-known participants on historical, political and literary topics. Scientific seminars and conferences are also organized.
