= Pavillon Suisse =

Residential building in Paris by Le Corbusier

Coordinates: 48°49′8.95″N 2°20′34.66″E

- Front of Pavillon Suisse.

Website
- www.fondationsuisse.fr/en/

The Fondation Suisse or Pavillon Le Corbusier is a building designed by Le Corbusier between 1930–31 and is located at the Cité Internationale Universitaire, in Paris.

== Description ==
Fondation suisse

The building was designed to house the Swiss students at the Cité Internationale Universitaire in Paris. It consists of a single story part and a four-story slab building on piloti. The pavilion summarises Corbusier's key ideas from the 1920s.

== Construction ==
The construction of this Pavilion was entrusted, without a competition, by the Committee of Swiss Universities to Le Corbusier and Pierre Jeanneret who at first refused to be charged with this commission. The manner in which their cause was handled by the Swiss federal authorities and the majority of Swiss public opinion at the time of the League of Nations Competition still lay heavy on their hearts. Nevertheless, at the insistence of the Swiss universities, they threw themselves into the work and built the pavilion with a budget reputed by the president of the Cité Universitaire to be only half-sufficient (3,000,000.00 fr.)

The construction of the building, under exceptionally difficult circumstances, provided the occasion for constituting a veritable laboratory of modern architecture: the most urgent were tackled, in particular, dry-wall construction and acoustic separation.
