= Miguel Ángel Estrella =

Argentine pianist (1940–2022)

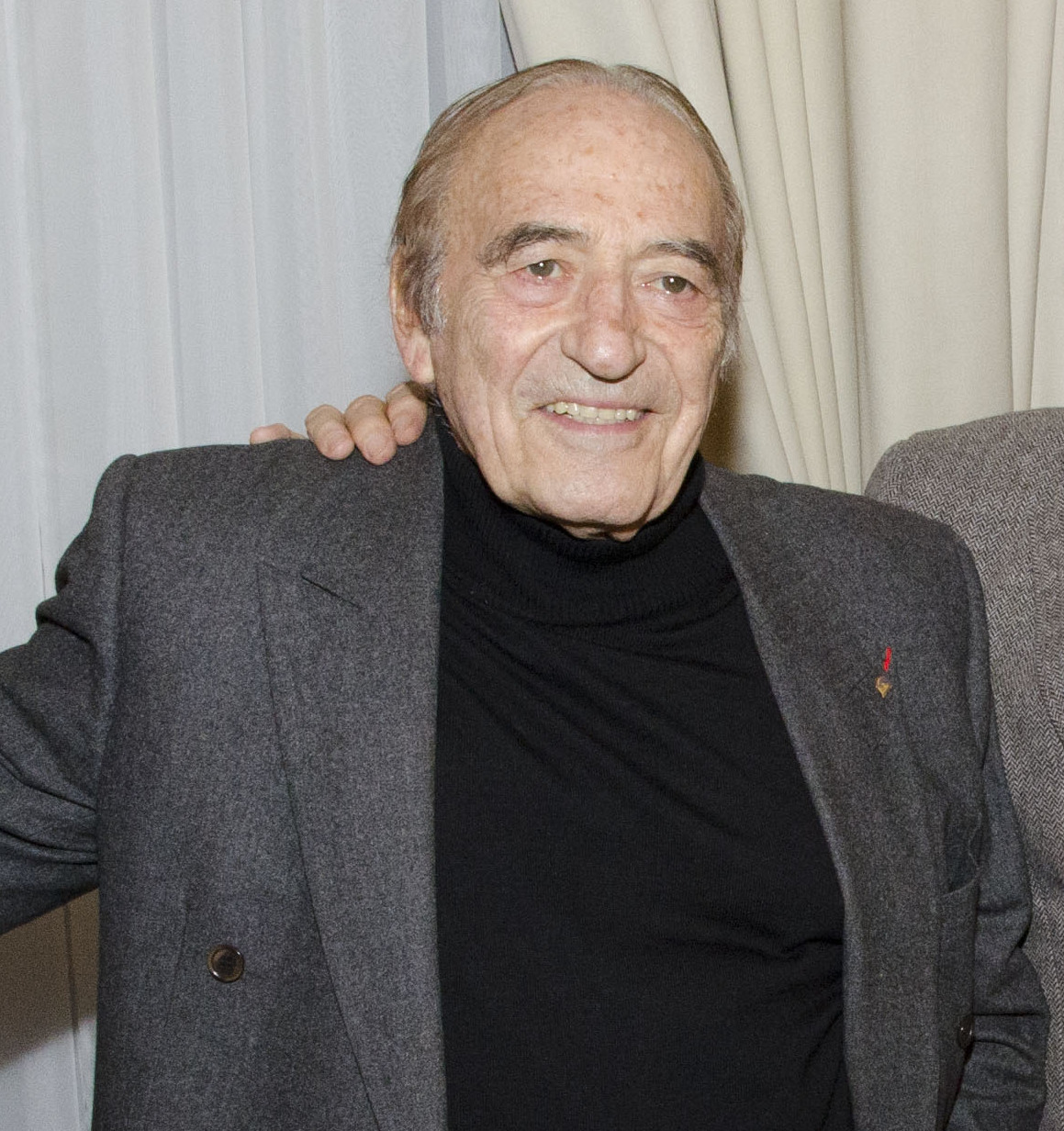
Estrella in 2014

Miguel Ángel Estrella (4 July 1940 – 7 April 2022) was an Argentine pianist, UNESCO Goodwill Ambassador, and a juror of the Russell Tribunal.

As a pianist, he numbered Celia de Bronstein, Erwin Leuchter, and Nadia Boulanger among his mentors.

He was born in San Miguel de Tucumán, Argentina. He went into exile in 1976 during the National Reorganization Process and was imprisoned and tortured in 1977 by the Civic-military dictatorship of Uruguay. He was released in 1980.

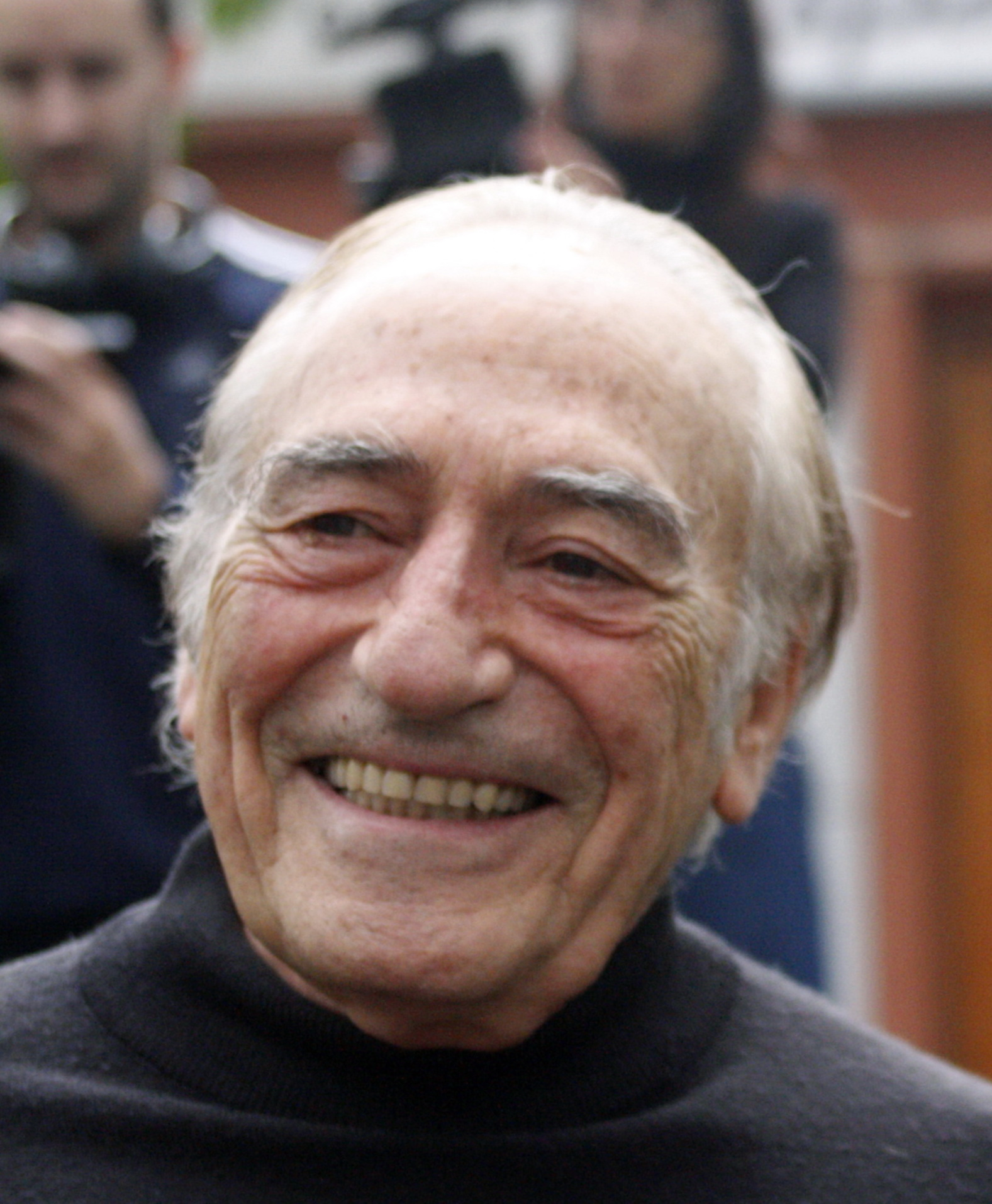
Miguel Ángel Estrella in Buenos Aires

From 2007 to 2016 he was the Argentine ambassador to the UNESCO and in 2010 he performed in the Estudio País Bicentenario programme broadcast by the state-run Canal Siete. On 11 March 2013, he was honoured by the Argentine Senate for his career and his defense of human rights.

The French government distinguished him with the appointment of Knight of the Legion of Honour.

He died April 7th 2022 in Ivry-sur-Seine (France).
