= Jean Dries =

French painter (1905–1973)

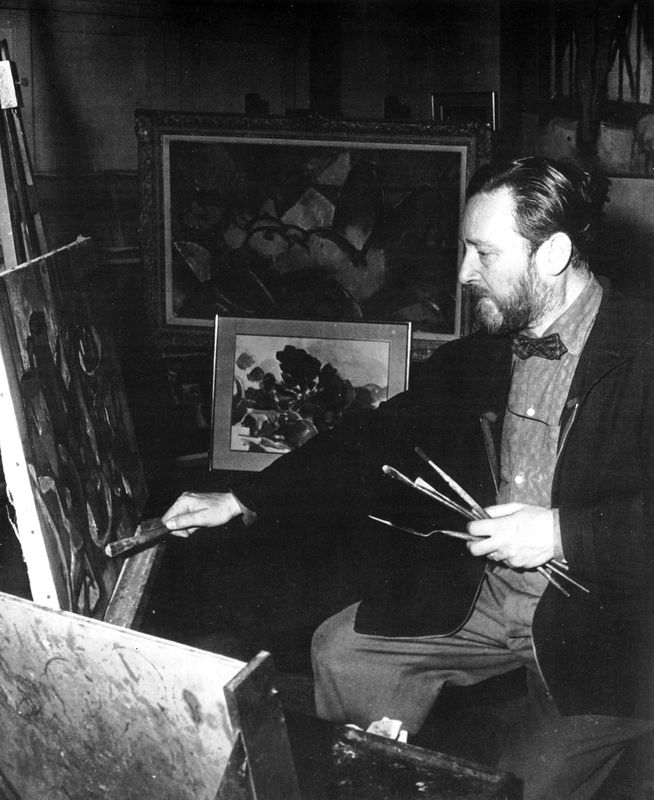
- Dries in his studio
- Born: Jean Driesbach; 19 October 1905; Bar-le-Duc, France
- Died: 26 February 1973 (aged 67); Paris, France
- Education: Lucien Simon, Beaux-Arts de Paris
- Known for: Painting, drawing
- Spouse: Geneviève Henriette Rosset (1910-1999)

Jean Dries (born Jean Driesbach; October 19, 1905 – February 26, 1973) was a French painter. He became a Parisian painter when he studied under Lucien Simon at the Ecole des Beaux Arts in Paris, through his adventures in the "zone", setting up several studios before finally settling in the Île Saint-Louis at 15 quai d'Anjou.

He was also a Provençal painter since he spent time in Provence following in the steps of Cézanne and Van Gogh in the 1930s and set up his last studio in Aurel, Vaucluse.

He can also be considered a painter from Normandy where he was drawn by his friends Jean Jardin and Edmond Duchesne and where he bought a house for his family in 1936. From 1953 to 1973 he was the curator of the Eugène Boudin Museum in Honfleur which still has some of his works on display.

As Dries believed that art transcended national borders he never stopped travelling outside of France and Europe. His admiration for Spanish and Italian masters led him to Spain and Italy. He taught art at the French colonial school in Sétif (Algeria) for a few months and was sent by the French government to Mendoza (Argentina) in the spring of 1940 to set up pictorial art studies at the University of Cuyo and to promote French culture.

Esthetically, he proclaimed himself to be totally independent. Starting in 1928 he exhibited in various Parisian Salons – Salon d'automne, Salon des Tuileries, Salon des indépendants – and steadfastly refused to be part of any school, style or genre. He painted landscapes, portraits, self-portraits, nudes, still lifes, seascapes, horse races and bullfights.

Although tempted by Impressionism, Cubism and especially Fauvism, he never gave into abstraction or non-figurative art. In his Blue Notebook he wrote "One cannot do without nature. One must neither torture it or oneself." He was a great colorist while remaining attentive to the balance of composition. It has been said of him that he was a "fauve Cézanne".

== Biography ==
Jean Driesbach was born in Bar-le-Duc in Meuse, France. Nothing in his family background predisposed him to become a painter. His mother's family (from Lorraine and Franche-Comté) had no ties to the art world. His paternal grandparents who had been wine growers near Colmar in the Haut-Rhin decided to leave Alsace in 1871 to remain French and had settled in Bar-le-Duc where his father was a bailiff.

Driesbach successfully completed his secondary studies despite two interruptions due to the war. The German advances in 1914-15 and in 1917-18 forced the family to seek refuge near Granville (Manche) in Normandy. This was where Dries first tried his hand at drawing and first saw the sea: "Deeply moved by the sea, played among the rocks, the port of Granville" he wrote.

1921 was a turning point in his life. His father died after a long illness and he was forced to work for the master glass-maker Gambut to help his family. He himself had a serious spinal injury (it immobilized him in a plaster cast for 8 months) and from which he suffered for the rest of his life. "I pass the time painting still-lifes and portraits." His talent came to the attention of his friend the future engraver Paul Lemagny and was encouraged by his philosophy teacher, Pierre Salzi, who introduced him to the painter Jules-Emile Zingg.

=== The formative years 1926–1930 ===
With the financial help of the alumni association of the lycée in Bar-le-Duc (200F) and the town (800F) as well as a loan on trust from the Meuse department, Driesbach left Lorraine for Paris. There he studied at the Ecole des Beaux arts with Auguste Laguillermie and Lucien Simon. He soon got a room at the Cité Internationale Universitaire de Paris where he made many friends and discovered music. "That's where I first heard Beethoven and Mozart". At the school he made some lifelong friends, including Paul Arzens. At this time out of financial necessity he painted doll faces and bonbonnieres.

==== Work ====
In Paris, Driesbach, who was starting to be called Jean Dries, attended the Ecole Nationale des Beaux Arts but also the art academies in Montparnasse where he drew a great deal. He also went to museums where he was very "impressed by Courbet and Cézanne." Looking for nature to paint, he explored the outskirts of Paris, the banks of the Seine, the "zone", Saint-Cloud and Ville d'Avray. His drawing talent was recognized in 1926 when he won first prize for a live model in modern dress for Un franciscain and in 1927 he obtained a teaching certificate for drawing.

==== Holidays ====
During the holidays at home in Bar-le-Duc, Dries painted the countryside (Les bords de l'Ornain, La forêt de Massonges), tried his hand at portraits (his two sisters) and also his first large scale compositions: Trois nus dans un paysage (1927), and Le déjeuner en forêt (1928) "Painting has never given me so much pleasure" he wrote. He also made his first journeys. In 1928 he traveled through Auvergne and the South of France (Avignon and Nîmes). It was however his trip in February 1929 to Cassis which made the deepest impression on him, "a marvelous journey, my dearest memory". While studying in London at the Institut de France in February–March 1929, he met Jean Jardin who would become his lifelong friend. Together they discovered the British Museum, the National Gallery and Dutch painting (Rembrandt, Van Gogh). Finally in 1930 with another close friend, Alexandre Marc-Lipianski, he visited Spain: its landscapes and of course its museums, "What emotion Velasquez and Goya inspire".

=== Setting up as an artist ===
==== Early recognition ====
In 1928, while still a student, Dries exhibited his first large-scale paintings at the Salon d'Automne and at the Salon des Indépendants and in 1931 when just 26 he exhibited L'Atelier which he had painted the year before. These submissions drew the attention of the critics who devoted long articles to his work: in November 1932 Thiébault-Sisson wrote in Le Temps "Dries is a born painter and I know of few talents as promising as his." In 1929 his first individual exhibition was hung in the staircase of the Comédie des Champs-Elysées (47 paintings and watercolours) and for the first time in 1930 the French Government bought one of his paintings: Sous-bois dans la Meuse. Recognized by critics, appreciated by private and public collectors, in 1936 Dries was acknowledged by his peers when he met the painter Vlaminck who asked to see some of his work and ended the visit with these words "The carp's not bad. You're a painter."

==== Paris and Honfleur ====
In 1930 he set up in Paris near the Porte d'Orléans and had his mother and two sisters join him. At the same time he bought a house for them in Honfleur, where they lived until 1961. He had been drawn there by his friends Jean Jardin and Edmond Duchesne, but for someone who was in love with the South of France the first contact was difficult, “Everything seemed lackluster and listless... It would take me years to get over this distaste, to become aware of the delicacy of the landscapes of northwestern France, the cradle of impressionism.” He continued to travel in late 1935 to take up a teaching position at the colonial school in Sétif Algeria. Disappointed by the few months he spent there he came back with only a few sketches, “I was disoriented by orientalism” he decided. He was more inspired by the trips he made to Italy and Switzerland (1932) and to Spain where he spent two weeks in Cadaquès, “I sometimes met the painter Salvador Dali. He had a house there and shocked the locals by the way he dressed.” A long journey in 1937 in particular took him to Cassis, Arles and Saint-Rémy-de-Provence in memory of Van Gogh. He also went to Tuscany and Rome to see his friend Paul Lemagny and discovered Corot's landscapes. In 1938 he had a major retrospective exhibition at the Charpentier Gallery including 84 paintings and 21 watercolors covering this period.

=== Maturity 1938–1964 ===
At 33 Dries was a recognized artist, exhibiting regularly in shows and art galleries. His works were bought by private collectors, the City of Paris and the French government. He had houses and studios in Paris and Honfleur.

==== World War II and the years following ====
It was in December 1938 as a grant holder at the Abbaye de Royaumont near Paris that he met “Mlle Rosset, an excellent musician” who became his wife on November 11, 1939, and was thereafter his favorite model. When the war broke out they were in Provence where Dries was a resident at the Laurent-Vibert Foundation. As his state of health precluded his being mobilised, he was at first posted as an art teacher to the Parisian Lycée Carnot which had been sent to Normandy for safety reasons. He was again disappointed by the experience. “I've got better things to do” he wrote in December of that year. The French government then sent him to Argentina to Mendoza where at Cuyo University he organized painting classes and his wife taught music. It was during the stopover in Rio that they learned of the defeat of France in the spring of 1940. In Argentina and Chile Dries found new landscapes to paint, interested students and new friends, the engraver Victor Delhez and the opera singer Jane Bathori, but was overwhelmed by sadness and worry for his family back in France. In spite of the offer of a five-year contract and the success of his exhibition in Buenos Aires presented by Margarita Abella Caprile, the Dries decided to return to France. They boarded ship December 4, 1941, three days before navigation became impossible after the attack on Pearl Harbor on December 7. On the way back the Portuguese Minister of Propaganda invited them to stop in Lisbon where Dries exhibited a few paintings, “unexpectedly successful, ...enthusiastic press coverage, lots of buyers” before reaching Paris in the spring of 1942. They found an apartment at 15 quai d’Anjou on Île Saint-Louis which became his ‘haven’ of choice and his studio until he died. He spent time in Paris, Honfleur and the South of France and his painting went in a new direction which would last several years. He began work on two paintings which would become recognized as two of his major works: Le portrait de la mère de l’artiste and especially Paris, 25 août 1944, "a nude woman leaning over a balcony where flags are waving. She symbolizes Paris at long last free." The use of highly contrasting colours, the red outline around forms marks the beginning of what some have called 'the red period'. After the war Dries began travelling again, in 1947 to Italy and Switzerland and Provence (where the Laurent-Vibert foundation offered him a second residency, the first having been cut short by the war), in 1948 to London and in 1949 to Mallorca in Spain. That same year their son Sebastien joined the family and inspired the artist with new themes.

==== After the Blue Notebook (1950–1964) ====
The Blue Notebook, in which Dries jotted down his artistic reflections, ended in 1950. He was probably too taken up by his work, family life and as curator at the Eugène Boudin Museum in Honfleur. He received many orders for paintings: two for the Chamber of Commerce in Caen in 1948, the Cité Universitaire in Paris (Victor Lyon Foundation) in 1950, the Middle School and the Chamber of Commerce of Honfleur in 1958, the Compagnie Générale Transatlantique for the ore carrier Lens in 1959 and most importantly for the Flandres suite on the liner France in 1961. He tried his hand at lithography (only two works: Bassin de la Gare à Honfleur and Le Jockey, 1956) and at illustrating (La Sainte Vehme de Pierre Benoit published in 1969 by Albin Michel). His main occupation however was painting for himself. He took his inspiration from studies done during his travels (Le Vallon à Menton in 1960 or Le Port de Saint-Tropez in 1958 and San Giorgio Maggiore Venice in 1957), horse races, and seascapes (Le Bonheur à Deauville in 1955). But more and more of his time was taken up by two other activities. He co-founded the Société des Artistes Honfleurais, which for fifty years organized an annual show. And in 1950 he became the assistant to Voisard-Margerie, the curator of the municipal Honfleur Museum from whom he took over in 1953. These activities were time-consuming and took a toll on his health. His work as a painter was crowned in 1958 by the Grand Prix for painting awarded by the city of Paris and the first prize in painting delivered by the town of Montrouge in 1962. That same year his endeavours on behalf of art were acknowledged by the French Government when he was named chevalier of the Légion d'Honneur.

=== The last ten years (1964–1973) ===
Despite his failing health, he opened a new studio in Aurel (Vaucluse). He was attracted there by his love for Mediterranean landscapes and by his friend, the painter Pierre Ambrogiani, whose work was exhibited in the same Parisian art gallery as Dries. Charmed by the village and the surroundings which reminded him of Sétif, he returned there every summer to soak up the atmosphere of the solidly structured landscapes dear to Cézanne and the vibrant colours associated with fauvism. But the museum in Honfleur took up too much time: he was sometimes forced to leave the South to oversee the work on the addition to the museum which began in 1972. When returning from a visit to the construction site he was struck down by a heart attack in his Parisian flat on February 26, 1973. He left unfinished his final work, Montagne de la Sainte-Victoire, an ultimate tribute to Cézanne, the master of Aix.

== Works ==
=== A little known artist ===
"Jean Dries, a secretive man" He talked little about his art, except in his Blue Notebook (Cahier Bleu) which ended in 1950. The only publication which covers his work extensively is Jean Dries which was published in 1979 by Junès et fils and even that is not really an academic study. It is therefore difficult to present succinctly such a varied production where the only documentation consists of numerous articles in the press.

=== Some permanent traits ===
==== Independence ====
He belonged to no school. "I am not at all impressed by schools. I do my own work. I try to express myself as sincerely and as completely as possible." He has, however, sometimes been associated with the École de Paris or with a group called the "peintres de l'Estuaire" who were an informal group with no other common bond than an affection for Honfleur and the Seine estuary. He felt totally free in the choice of his subjects. In 1962 Daniel-Rops said "What did he paint? What he saw ...anything at all." "He was an open admirer of the Normandy landscape, buxom nudes and wholesome earthly pleasures." Dries tried his hand at landscapes (of Normandy and elsewhere), nudes, still lives, portraits, seascapes, horse races, and large-scale compositions. No subject left him indifferent.

==== High standards ====
Dries "is constantly seeking, he's never satisfied, he's always evolving." "I'm working on a big painting that I call Concert Champêtre... I'm sending it to the Tuileries, but I'm not very satisfied with it." This dissatisfaction explains why many of his paintings weren't signed. He only signed paintings he was going to exhibit or sell. To his way of thinking, a painting was never completed and he could always alter it. Dries didn't hesitate to destroy paintings he wasn't satisfied with. In 1956 he estimated that he had “done about 1100 paintings including 300 or so which had been destroyed by the artist.”

==== Constant evolution ====
Even once he reached maturity Dries never stopped exploring new paths, "What's important to me is the structure of the composition. I always return to the same themes, but treat them differently depending on what I am experimenting with at the time." This diversity makes it difficult to classify the artist and his works in a narrowly defined category. There are nonetheless certain permanent preoccupations: "You can't do without nature" As Jean Bouret said, "Somebody's going to say 'How realistic it all is', and I, of course, am going to have a fit, because Dries doesn't describe the object (he's painting), but transforms it into an object that has been plunged into a very different world, because he is a true painter." According to Clément Rosset "The privilege of the painter is to render palpable the singularity of all that exists, its foreignness and its solitude." So he rejected abstract art, was faithful to nature, but to a nature transposed. He was also faithful to certain masters seen in museums (Courbet, Cézanne) or studios (Favory). Lastly memories of his childhood in Lorraine and outings in the forests of the Meuse influenced his palette giving it "pure tones dominated by blues and greens. And the use of earthy hues and black."

=== An attempt at a chronology ===
A history of the works by Dries is possible, based on his all-too-rare writings on the subject, but also difficult as he seldom hesitated to rework old paintings according to his current experiments and state of mind.

==== Early works ====
Well into the 1930s Dries was still trying to find himself. And although the critics had already recognized his talent he was sometimes reproached for not mastering composition or for letting himself be too influenced by his contemporaries. Nonetheless his first paintings already exhibit a certain originality as can be seen in his first self-portrait.(Autoportrait 1926)

==== The impact of his first trips ====
Discovering the Midi and the intense light of the south of France created a shock that altered his way of seeing and his style: "I'm seeing Cézanne's motifs and am literally enchanted" "Is it my travels in Spain, the light in the South? I'm going to have to take care to make my tones lighter and warmer" Le chemin à Cassis (1933) comes from this period.

==== His "Impressionist" phase ====
This attention to light, reinforced by his first difficult contact with Honfleur and by his desire to hold on to what he thought defined French art, especially after the defeat of 1940, drove him to experiment briefly with impressionism. "At Lourmarin (1939)… studying the problem of light when painting outdoors drew me inevitably closer to the impressionists. I knew it was just an experiment, but I threw myself into it." Le jardin d'Honfleur dates from this period. It's noteworthy that paradoxically Dries fails to mention the names of any impressionists in his Blue notebook.

==== His "Red" period ====
Dries's work in the period 1943–1944 opened a highly original chapter in his aesthetic thinking. "In May 1943 I started work on a painting of the Liberation that I would later call Paris, 25 août 1944… the red outline is very sustained (heavy). The oranges and reds contrast with the dark blues, the transition is made of lilac tones and greens." At this time, like the fauve painters, Dries exalted colour to the utmost. "It's a very cerebral [work] of pure artistry." where sometimes, in his use of pure solid colours, in the red or black outlines, the artist was without doubt inspired by his memories of time spent working in the workshop of the master glassmaker Gambut. This is noticeable in Le paysage dans la colline of 1947. But this cerebral work, though undoubtedly necessary, is dangerous: "this cerebral work which dictates colour arrangements leads to decoration and abstraction. What is decorative is poor and artificial."

==== A return to reason? (1950–1960) ====
Dries went back to a more classical style to the relief of certain art critics shocked by his "red" period. "In August – September [1948] I felt an imperious need to go back to painting landscapes outdoors." His palette became less extreme and returned to the greens, blues and earthy hues which had been forsaken during the red period. Most of his horse race paintings and works like Le ruisseau de montagne (1960) are from this period.

==== Back to the south of France (1960–1973) ====
Dries spent the free time 'his' Honfleur museum left him in the house he bought in Aurel in the Vaucluse. He went back to the colours of the south and his palette became lighter but in a more serene and peaceful style that he will maintain until his sudden disappearance in 1973. "Now the paint gives life to tone as well as the form in such a way that for Dries, a patient man, paint, colour and form are of equal importance." This can be seen in his last works of which Le plateau d'Albion (1970) is an example. As the art critic, Robert Vrinat said "the solid but not rigid composition shows Dries to be a disciple of Cézannian thinking which he went back to with gusto as had Friesz and Vlaminck."

== Annexes ==
=== Exhibits ===
==== Main personal exhibits ====
- 1929 : Paris, escalier de la Comédie des Champs-Élysées
- 1938 : Paris, Gallery Charpentier
- 1941 : Buenos-Aires (Argentine), Gallery Amigos del Arte
- 1942 : Lisbonne (Portugal), the Propaganda Ministry gallery
- 1946 : Paris, Gallery Durand-Ruel
- 1947 : Philadelphia, Pennsylvania (USA), Gallery Georges de Braux
- 1957 : Paris, Gallery Katia Granoff
- 1965 et 1971 : Paris, Gallery Paul Ambroise

Retrospectives

- 1977 : Honfleur, Gallery Braquehaye
- 1979 : Cologne (West Germany), Gallery Boisseree am Museum
- 1983 : Museums of Bar-le-Duc and of Honfleur
- 1988 : Bergen (The Netherlands)
- 1990 : Lourmarin (Vaucluse)
- 1995 : Honfleur, Gallery Arthur Boudin
- 2005 : Honfleur, Musée Eugène Boudin

==== Group exhibits ====
As a member of the Salon d’Automne and of the Salon des Indépendants, Dries regularly exhibited works in them starting in 1928. As an invited guest, he exhibited works in the Salon des Tuileries, Salon du Dessin et de la Peinture à l’eau, aux Peintres Témoins de leur Temps, and in the Salons of Honfleur, Asnières, Terres Latines, and Comparaisons. Dries also frequently participated in numerous group exhibits, for example:

- 1945 : Galliera Museum, Paris – French painters in London
- 1947 : Georges de Braux Gallery, Philadelphia, Penn. (USA) - Still Life
- 1953 : Charpentier Gallery - Nudes
- 1958 : National Museum of Modern Art, Mexico City (Mexico)
- 1960 : Group Comparison, Ueno Museum in Tokyo (Japan) and the cities of Saigon, Bangkok…
- 1968 : Schmit Gallery, Paris – The French Tradition
- 1976 : City of Deauville – Fauvism in Normandy

=== State Acquisitions ===
- 1930 : Sous-bois dans la Meuse
- 1936 : La mare de Saint-Michel
- 1936 : La Zone au printemps
- 1938 : La campagne au matin
- 1938 : Vue sur la Madrague
- 1939 : La carpe
- 1948 : La moisson à Francheville
- 1951 : Nature Morte : Les poires sur la table
- 1952 : Nature Morte aux fruits
- 1953 : Le port de Saint-Tropez
- 1955 : Le bonheur à Deauville
- 1963 : Le vallon à Menton
- 1977 : La nymphette

=== Where works by Dries can be seen ===
A number of museums have pictures by Dries in their collections.

In Paris:

- Musée national d’art moderne : Les poires sur la table, Le port de Saint-Tropez
- Musée du Domaine départemental de Sceaux : L'église de Morienval
- Fonds national d'art contemporain
- Fond municipal d'art contemporain de Paris

Elsewhere in France:

- Musée de Grenoble: Le bonheur à Deauville
- Musée de Riom : Nature morte à la clarinette
- Médiathèque de Deauville: Sur la plage à Deauville

Above all Honfleur, in the Musée Eugène-Boudin (fr), where the largest Dries collection can be found.

Abroad:

- Museum of Mendoza
- Museum of Buenos Aires

== See also ==
- Lucien Simon
- École nationale supérieure des beaux-arts

== Bibliography ==
- J.A. Cartier : Jean Dries 1905, Ed. Pierre Cailler, Genève 1956 in the cahiers d’art-documents No. 42
- Daniel-Rops : DRIES, Ed. Pierre Cailler, Geneva, 1962
- L’officiel des arts (Annuaire international des arts plastiques), published by the Société des revues et publications, Tome I, p. 331 Paris, 1978
- Collective : Jean Dries, Ed. Junes et fils, Suresnes, 1979 (Presentation by Jean Adhémar, Jean Bouret, Fernand Ledoux, Georges Poisson and Michel de Saint Pierre)
- Jean Dries : Notes du Cahier bleu, Ed. Musée de Bar-le-Duc 1983. Presentation by J. Warnod et M. Gohel in the catalogue for the 1983 exhibit at the Musée de Bar-le-Duc.
- Pierre Assouline : Une éminence grise, Ed. Balland, 1986
- Jean Dries 1905-1973 : Catalogue of the works in the museum's collection, Ed. Société des Amis du Musée Eugène Boudin, Imprimerie Marie, Honfleur July 5, 1989.
