= André Honnorat =

French politician

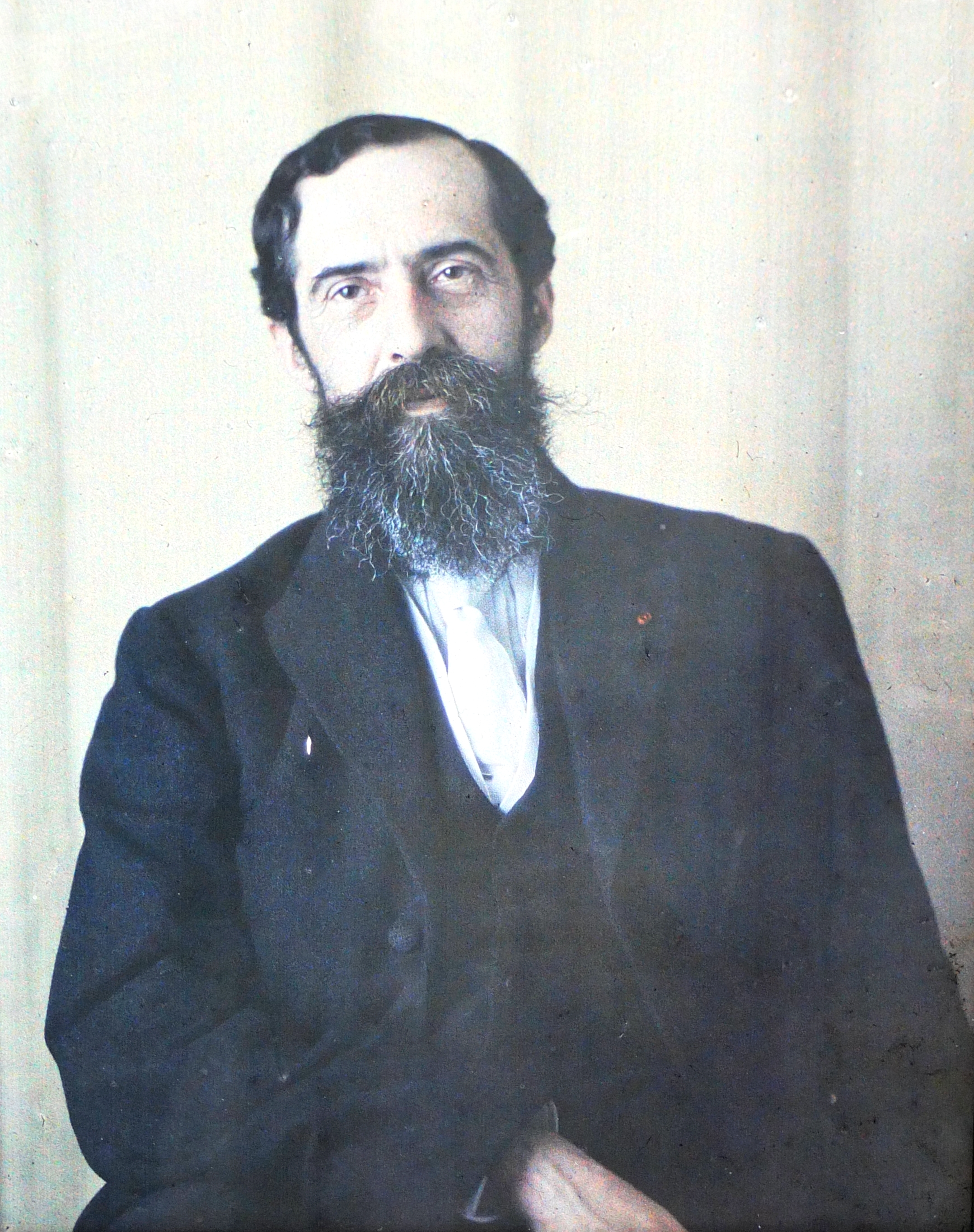
- Honnorat in 1920
- Born: 10 December 1868; Paris, France
- Died: 24 July 1950 (aged 81); Paris, France
- Occupation: Politician
- Relatives: Jean-Maurice Demarquet (great-nephew)

André Honnorat (French: [ɑ̃dʁe ɔnɔʁa]; 10 December 1868 – 24 July 1950) was a French politician. He served as a member of the Chamber of Deputies from 1910 to 1921, and as a member of the French Senate from 1921 to 1945, representing Basses-Alpes.

Together with Émile Deutsch de la Meurthe, he created the Cité Internationale Universitaire de Paris (CIUP), and there is also a residence there which is named after him.

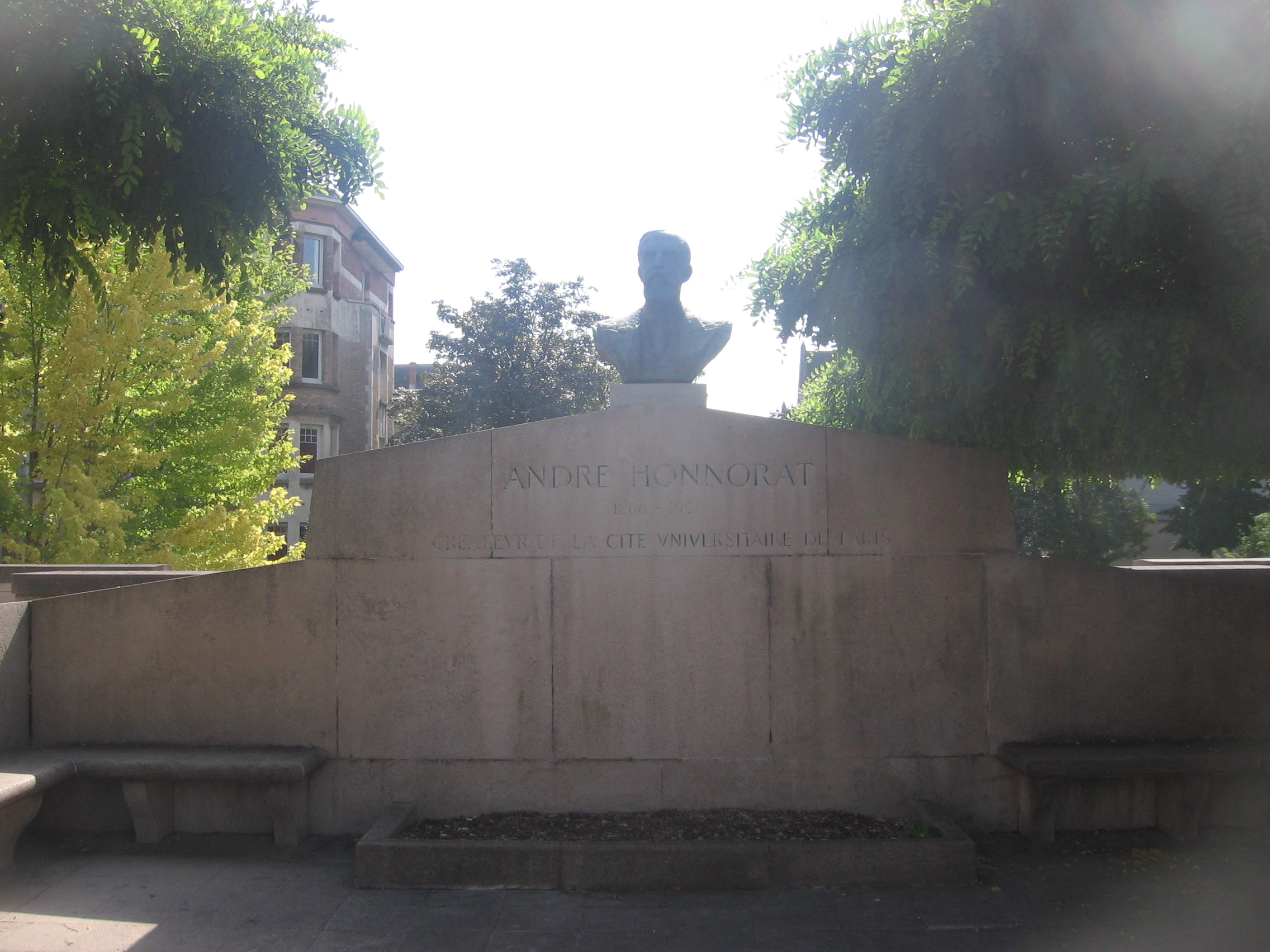
Statue of André Honnorat in Cité Internationale Universitaire de Paris
