= Maison du Brésil =

- Front of the Maison du Brésil.

General information
- Location: France
- Address: 7 L Boulevard Jourdan, 75014 Paris
- Coordinates: 48°49′4″N 2°20′37″E
- Owner: Cité Universitaire

Design and construction
- Architect(s): Le Corbusier

Maison du Brésil is a student hostel building located in the Cité Universitaire complex in Paris, France, designed by noted architects Le Corbusier and Lúcio Costa for Brazilian students and scientists. It was built in 1957 and refurbished in 2000. The first sketch for the building was made by Costa, but soon afterwards Le Corbusier became a collaborator, working out the final design.

== Function ==
The Maison du Brésil is dedicated to housing of Brazilian students, professors, and research scientists who come to Paris for academic work. It also houses artists and other professionals doing internships in Paris. Since its opening in 1959, it has welcomed Joaquim Pedro de Andrade, Jaime Lerner, Zuenir Ventura, Sebastião Salgado, Arthur Moreira Lima, Zózimo Barroso do Amaral, Antonio Abujamra, Francisco Rezek and many others.

== Architecture ==
Balconies of Maison du Brésil

Brazilian students hostel, Paris

The upper five floors consist of cellular single and double bedrooms, music room, kitchen common room and studies in a tapered long narrow block. The ground floor with snack bar, caretakers flat, meeting room games room etc. consists of a loosely shaped assemblage of rooms which appears to pass under the upper block.

Many visitors to the building are struck by the rough textures, yellow colours to the windows and doors which are reflected in the later Habitations in Berlin, Firminy Vert and elsewhere.

Having been designed by two leading architects, Le Corbusier and Lúcio Costa, the Maison du Brésil has been recognized as an important architectural patrimony. It has been added in 1985 to the list of French Historical Monuments. It receives yearly hundreds of visitors, architects, students and architecture enthusiasts, that can visit the Hall and a student room with the original Corbusier design.

== Cultural infrastructures ==
The Maison also has a theatre, an exhibition Hall, an extensive library of 12500 titles in Portuguese and French, a videoteque of 1500 titles, and a multi-use conference room.
