= Émile Deutsch de la Meurthe =

French industrialist (1847-1924)

- Born: Émile Deutsch; October 22, 1847; La Villette, Seine (Paris), France
- Died: May 18, 1924 (aged 76); Quimper, France
- Occupations: Industrialist and philanthropist
- Known for: Running his fathers oil company Les Fils de A. Deutsch with his brother
- Spouse: Louise Halphen
- Children: 4
- Father: Alexandre Deutsch
- Family: Henry Deutsch (brother)
- Awards: Commander of the Legion of Honor

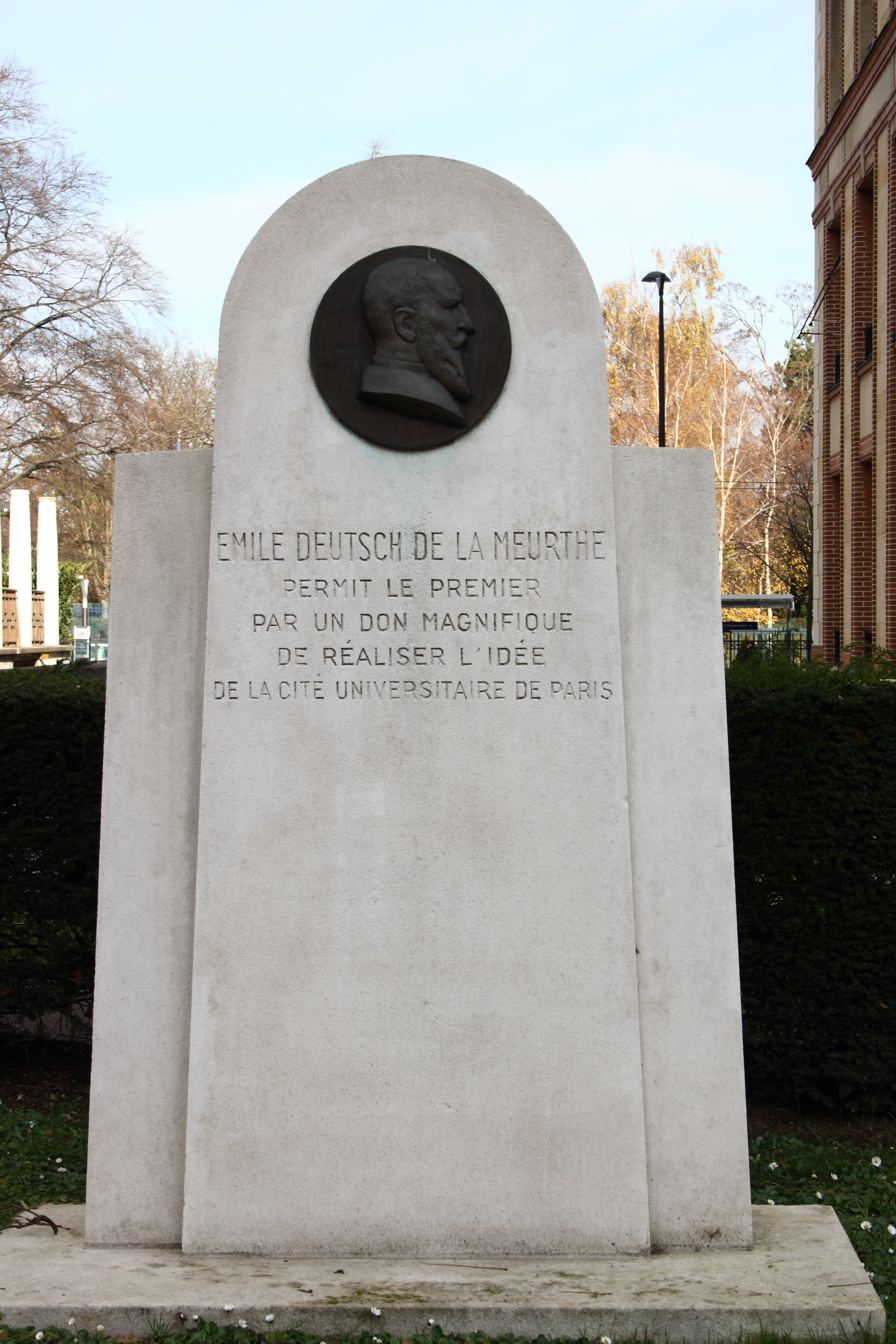
Memorial plaque in the Cité internationale universitaire

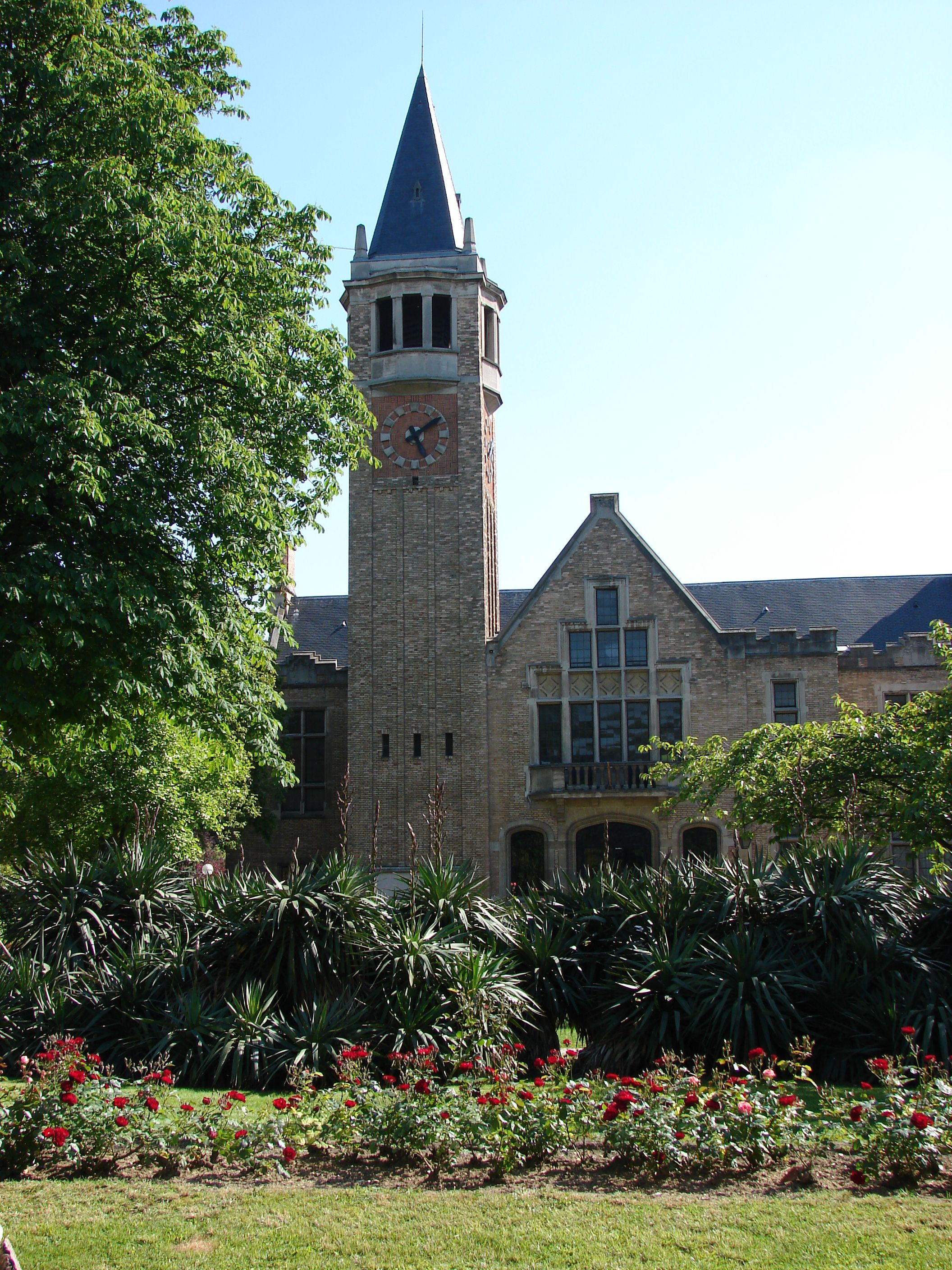
Fondation Deutsch de la Meurthe in the Cité internationale universitaire, central administration pavilion

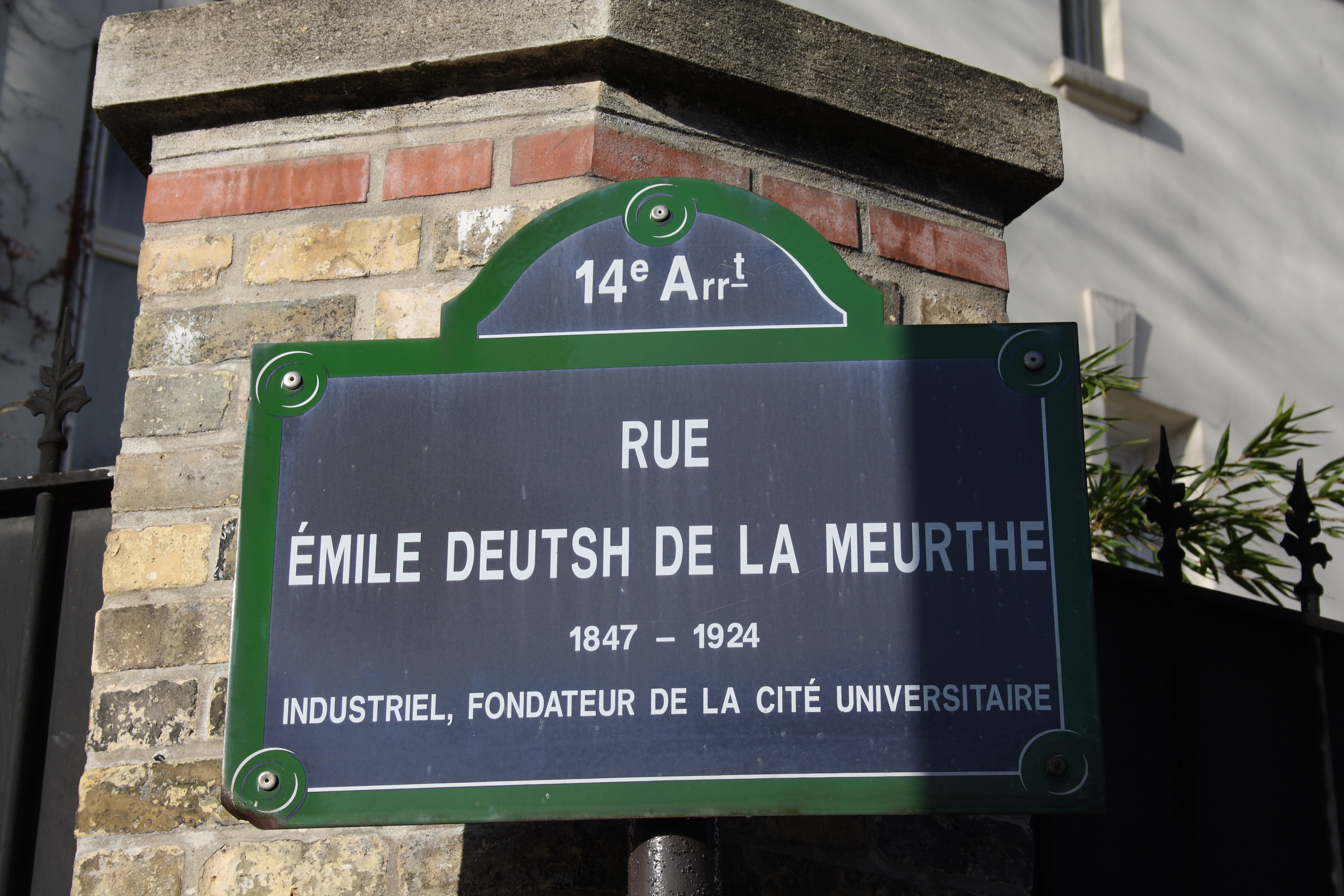
Street sign in Paris with misspelled name

Émile Deutsch de la Meurthe (October 22, 1847 - May 18, 1924) was a French industrialist and philanthropist.

== Family and early life ==
Émile Deutsch de la Meurthe was born as the son of the Jewish businessman Alexandre Deutsch (* 1815 in Lorraine), who set up an oil refinery in Pantin and thus laid the foundation for the future corporate empire. Émile and his brother Henry adopted the name suffix de la Meurthe, in memory of the origin of their ancestors from the Meurthe area.

Deutsch de la Meurthe was married to Louise, née Halphen († 1914). This marriage resulted in four daughters: Marie Henriette Emilie (1879–1973), Yvonne Fanny (1882–1969), Lucie Jeanne (1888–1945) and Fernande Amélie Valentine (1894–1969).

== Career ==
From 1877, Deutsch and his brother Henry ran their father's company, which was initially called A. Deutsch et ses Fils and later Les Fils de A. Deutsch. They developed an oil company that owned refineries in France, Spain, and Austria-Hungary. In 1922, Deutsch de la Meurthe brought his company into a joint venture with Royal Dutch Shell, the newly created company was called Société des Pétroles Jupiter.

== Philanthropic work ==
Deutsch de la Meurthe donated a large part of his fortune for philanthropic works. In 1915, he was a co-founder of the oeuvre des orphelins israélites de la guerre (Foundation for Jewish War Orphans). In 1916, he founded the Fraternité franco-américaine, which supported war orphans in several countries. He set up his own social security system for his workers.

With substantial support from Deutsch, the Cité internationale universitaire was created on the southern outskirts of Paris. The dormitory of the Fondation Deutsch de la Meurthe is named after him and his wife.

== Honors ==
Deutsch de la Meurthe was commander of the Legion of Honor, Commander of the Orden de Isabel la Católica and bearer of the Croix de guerre. After his death, the rue Émile-Deutsch-de-la-Meurthe was named after him by a resolution dated October 2, 1924 in the 14th arrondissement of Paris.

== Legacy ==
When the Nazis invaded France in World War II, the Deutsch de la Meurthe family fled, and the art collection was looted.

== Literature ==
- Brigitte Blanc und Philippe Ayrault (Fotos): La Cité internationale universitaire de Paris. La fondation Émile et Louise Deutsch de la Meurthe. Somogy, Paris 2010, ISBN 978-2-7572-0372-9, S. 5.
