= Press club =

Organization for journalists and others

A press club is an organization for journalists and others who are professionally engaged in the production and dissemination of news. A press club whose membership is defined by the press of a given country may be known as a National Press Club of that country.

Press clubs for foreign correspondents are called Foreign Correspondents' Clubs.

== History ==
The first press club was founded in Vienna in 1859, which is called Concordia Press Club and still Austria's main press club .

== Roles ==
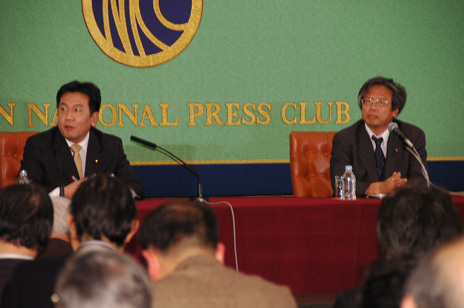
A meeting of Japan's National Press Club in 2010

In Japan, press clubs are called kisha clubs. They often create close relationships to their sources, effectively monopolizing the news. They also often institute "blackboard agreements", in which they agree not to report stories until a certain date.

== List of press clubs ==
Examples of press clubs include the following.

- International Association of Press Clubs
- International online Press Club

=== Asia ===
- Chitral Press Club (Pakistan)
- Chittagong Press Club (Bangladesh)
- Dubai Press Club
- Sharjah Press Club (UAE)
- Japan National Press Club
- Jatiya Press Club (Bangladesh)
- Karachi Press Club (Pakistan)
- Lahore Press Club (Pakistan)
- Milwaukee Press Club
- Narayanganj Online Press Club
- National Press Club (Pakistan)
- National Press Club (Philippines)
- Press Club Sadhoke (Pakistan)
- Peshawar Press Club (Pakistan)
- Press Club of Pakistan UK
- Press Club of India (New Delhi)
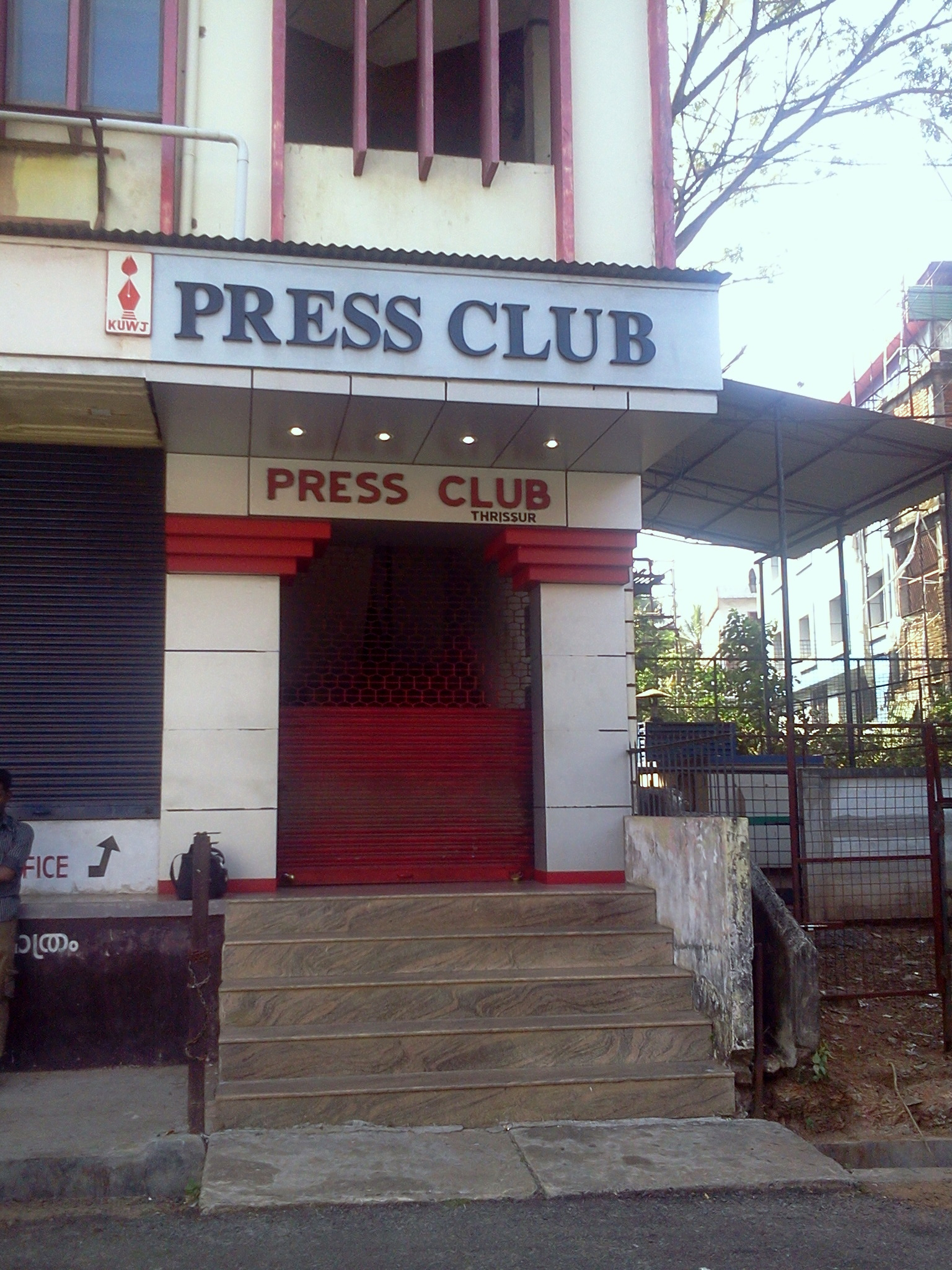
  The Thrissur Press Club headquarters
- Press Club, Thiruvananthapuram (India)
- Quetta Press Club (Pakistan)
- Thrissur Press Club (India)
- Sitakunda Press Club

(Chattogram, Bangladesh)

=== Africa and Oceania ===
- Cape Town Press Club (South Africa)
- Melbourne Press Club (Australia)
- National Press Club (Australia)
- National Press Club (South Africa)
- National Broadcasting Corporation National Press Club (Papua New Guinea)

=== Americas ===
Logo of the US's National Press Club

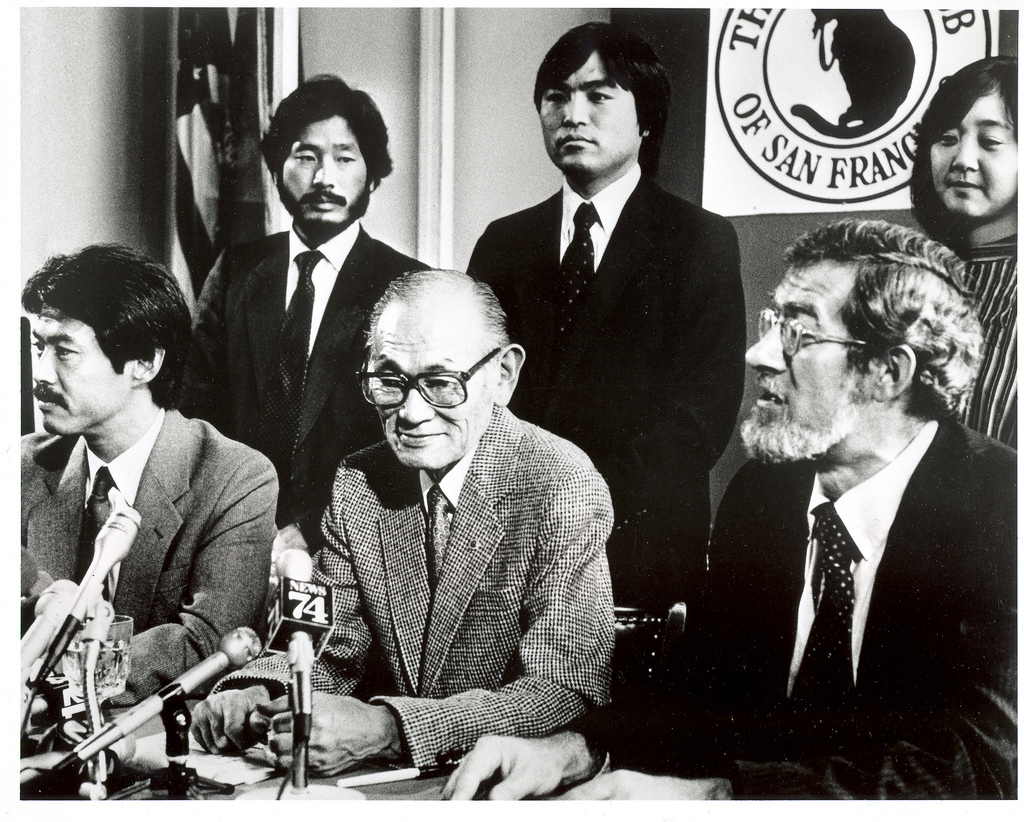
Fred Korematsu (front, center) at The Press Club of San Francisco for a press conference about the federal court coram nobis petition, 1983

- American News Women's Club
- Capital Press Club (US)
- Club de Periodistas de Mexico
- Denver Press Club (US)
- Gridiron Club (US)
- Hollywood Women's Press Club (US)
- Los Angeles Press Club (US)
- Media Club of Canada (defunct)
- Michigan Woman's Press Association (US)
- Milwaukee Press Club (US)
- National Press Club of Canada
- National Press Club (United States)
- New England Woman's Press Association (US)
- New York Press Club (US)
- Newswomen's Club of New York (US)
- Omaha Press Club
- Pacific Coast Women's Press Association (US)
- Pen & Pencil Club (US)
- The Press Club of San Francisco
- Overseas Press Club of America (New York, US)
- San Diego Press Club (US)
- The Silurians Press Club
- Syracuse Press Club (US)
- Woman's Press Club of New York City (US)
- Women's Press Club of Los Angeles (US)

=== Europe ===
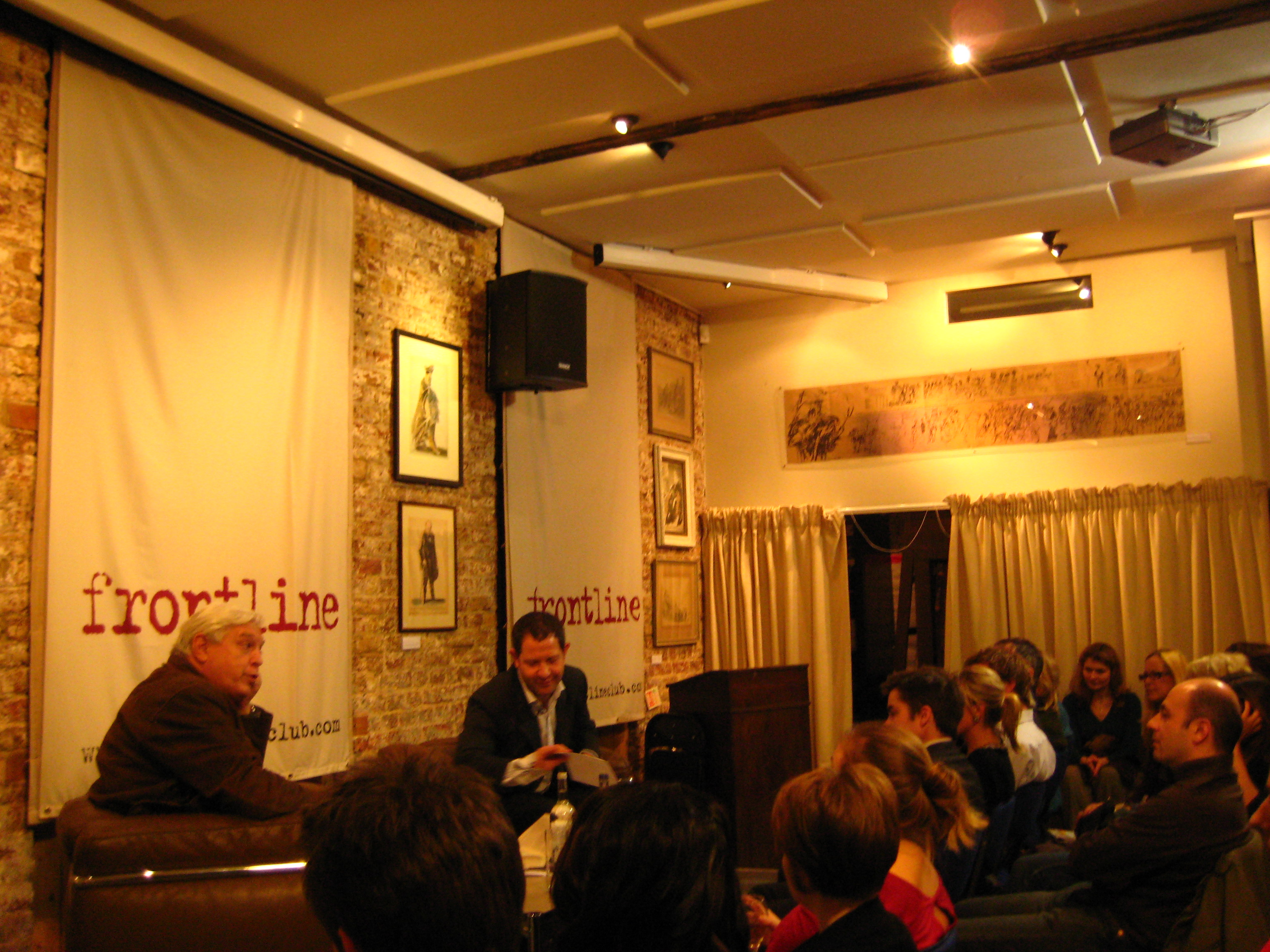
A meeting of the UK's Frontline Club

- Berliner Presse Club (Germany)
- Birmingham Press Club (UK)
- Concordia Press Club (Austria), the oldest of its type in the world
- Frontline Club (London, UK)
- Press Club of Pakistan UK
- London Press Club (UK)
- Press Club Brussels Europe
- Press Club de France
- Press Club Polska (Poland)

== See also ==
- International Association of Press Clubs
- Foreign Correspondents' Club
- Press Club (band), an Australian punk band
