= Pakistan Federal Union of Journalists =

Trade union for Pakistani journalists

PFUJ
- Pakistan Federal Union of Journalists
- Founded: 2 August 1950
- Key people: GM Jamali (President); Shahzada Zulfiqar (General Secretary)
- Affiliations: International Federation of Journalists

The Pakistan Federal Union of Journalists (PFUJ) is a trade union federation of journalists in Pakistan. The PFUJ is affiliated with the International Federation of Journalists.

There have been different factions within the PFUJ: as of July 2022, the "Afzal Butt faction" represented 7,958 members while as of 2024 the "Rana Azeem faction" represented 9,962 members.

== History ==
The constitution of the PFUJ was first adopted in Karachi in April 1950 at the Pakistan Working Journalists Convention, in a meeting opened by Muhammad Zafarullah Khan. The last affiliate union adopted the constitution on August 2, thus marking the formal beginning of the union. Muhammad Abdul Shakoor became the first president and Israr Ahmad the first secretary general. In 2025, Shakeel Ahmed was elected as Secretary General and Rana Muhammad Azeem the president . In Feb 2014, a merger of PFUJ and All Pakistan Newspaper Employees Confederation (APNEC) was announced to consolidate and strengthen the two organisations of journalists.

The PFUJ launched its website in 2015.

When Express Tribune journalist Bilal Farooqi was arrested for alleged hateful and anti-military social media posts in September 2020, PFUJ condemned the arrest together with the International Federation of Journalists.

In 2020, Shahzada Zulfiqar was the PFUJ president and Nasir Zaidi was the secretary general.

== See also ==
- Council of Pakistan Newspaper Editors
- National Press Club of Pakistan based in Islamabad
- Karachi Press Club
- Lahore Press Club
- Minhaj Barna, founder of PFUJ and former President of All Pakistan Newspaper Employees Confederation (APNEC)
- Peshawar Press Club
- Quetta Press Club
- All Pakistan Newspapers Society (APNS)
