= Alleged Pakistani support for Osama bin Laden =

Relationship between the state of Pakistan and Osama bin Laden

Diagram of the compound

Pakistan was alleged to have provided support for Osama bin Laden. These claims have been made both before and after bin Laden was found living in a compound in Abbottabad, Pakistan and was killed by a team of United States Navy SEALs on 2 May 2011. The compound itself was located just half a mile from Pakistan's premier military training academy, Kakul Military Academy (PMA), in Abbottabad. In the aftermath of bin Laden's death, American president Barack Obama asked Pakistan to investigate the network that sustained bin Laden. "We think that there had to be some sort of support network for bin Laden inside of Pakistan", Obama said in a 60 Minutes interview with CBS News. He also added that the United States was not sure "who or what that support network was." In addition to this, in an interview with Time magazine, CIA Director Leon Panetta stated that US-officials did not alert Pakistani counterparts to the raid because they feared the terrorist leader would be warned. However, the documents recovered from bin Laden's compound 'contained nothing to support the idea that bin Laden was protected or supported by the Pakistani officials'. Instead, the documents contained criticism of Pakistani military and future plans for attack against the Pakistani military installations.

Based on an investigative report by the New York Times, Pakistan's intelligence agency, the Inter-Services Intelligence, was aware of bin Laden's whereabouts and chose not to share this information with the United States. According to Fred Burton, vice-president of the global intelligence firm Stratfor, officials of ISI, Pakistani military, along with one retired Pakistani military general, had knowledge of the arrangements made for bin Laden and the safe house. Bin Laden's compound was razed that day at his Abbottabad safe house.

David Ignatius in The Washington Post referred to the claim of the former ISI chief General Ziauddin Butt that the Abbottabad compound was used by the Intelligence Bureau and noted that a report in the Pakistani press in December had quoted him as saying that Osama's stay at Abbottabad was arranged by Brigadier (retired) Ijaz Shah, senior ISI officer and the head of the Intelligence Bureau during 2004–2008, on Pervez Musharraf's orders. Later Butt denied making any such statement.

The allegations have led to tension between the two countries and raised questions about Pakistan's role in the war on terror.

== Allegations ==
It was decided that any effort to work with the Pakistanis could jeopardize the mission. They might alert the targets.

— Leon Panetta, Director of the CIA

Critics cited the very close proximity (800 yards) of bin Laden's heavily fortified compound (a custom-built luxury complex) to Pakistan's National Military Academy (PMA), Pakistan's "West Point", and that the United States chose not to notify Pakistani authorities before the operation, and the alleged double standards of Pakistan regarding the perpetrators of the 2008 Mumbai attacks. Alleged US-government files leaked by WikiLeaks disclosed that American diplomats were told that Pakistani security services were tipping off bin Laden every time US-forces approached. Pakistan's Inter-Services Intelligence (ISI) also helped smuggle al Qaeda militants into Afghanistan to fight NATO troops. According to the leaked files, in December 2009, the government of Tajikistan had told US-officials that many in Pakistan were aware of bin Laden's whereabouts.

Leon Panetta, Director of the CIA, and later US Secretary of Defense, stated that Pakistan was "either involved or incompetent." In an interview to CBC Television,

Obviously the concern has always been how could a compound like this, how could bin Laden be in an area where there were military establishments, where we could see the military operating and not have them know.

Regarding the US decision to withhold intelligence about the raid from Pakistan, he said,

The concern we had is that...we had provided intelligence to them with regards to other areas and unfortunately, for one way or another, it got leaked to the individuals we were trying to go after, so as a result of that we were concerned that if we were going to perform a sensitive mission like this, we had to do it on our own.

Talking about the support network Panetta stated that some "lower rank" officers in the military knew where Bin Laden was hiding. The defense secretary said,

Well, you know, these situations sometimes, the leadership within Pakistan [sic] is obviously not aware of certain things and yet people lower down in the military establishment find it very well, they've been aware of it, ...But bottom line is that we have not had evidence that provides that direct link.

It is inconceivable that bin Laden did not have support system in the country that allowed him to remain there for extended period of time,

— John O. Brennan, U.S. Homeland Security Advisor

Husain Haqqani the former-Pakistan Ambassador to the United States, who earlier said both countries "cooperated in making sure" that the operation leading to bin Laden's death was "successful", has admitted that Osama bin laden indeed had a support system in Pakistan, albeit without the Pakistani government being privy to this fact.

Obviously, bin Laden did have a support system (in Pakistan). The issue was that support system within the government and the state of Pakistan or within the society of Pakistan, ...We all know that there are people in Pakistan who share the same belief system as bin Laden and other extremists... So that is a fact, that there are people who probably protected him... We did not know. We had no knowledge [about Bin Laden]. And if we had knowledge, we would have acted upon it long ago" —Mr. Haqqani said in an interview.

A Pakistani official, speaking anonymously, said "We assisted only in terms of authorization of the helicopter flights in our airspace" and that "we did not want anything to do with such an operation in case something went wrong."

US Senator Joe Lieberman, Chairman of the Senate Homeland Security Committee, said "This is going to be a time of real pressure on Pakistan to basically prove to us that they didn't know that bin Laden was there". John O. Brennan, Obama's chief counterterrorism advisor, said that it was inconceivable that bin Laden did not have support from within Pakistan. He further stated: "People have been referring to this as hiding in plain sight. We are looking at how he was able to hide out there for so long." Senator Dianne Feinstein said that "it's hard for me to understand how the Pakistanis ... would not know what was going on inside the compound", and that top Pakistan officials may be "walking both sides of the street." Senator Lindsey Graham questioned, "How could [bin Laden] be in such a compound without being noticed?", raising suspicions that Pakistan was either uncommitted in the fight against Islamist militants or was actively sheltering them while pledging to fight them. A Pakistani intelligence official said that they had passed on raw phone tap data to the United States that led to the operation, but had failed to analyze this data themselves. Carl Levin who is chairman United States Senate Committee on Armed Services stated that he believes Pakistani officials knew the location of bin Laden and had "no doubt" they also know the location of other senior al-Qaeda operatives. He said Pakistan's intelligence and army have "got a lot of explaining to do," given that bin Laden was holed up in such a large house with surrounding buildings, the fact that its residents took the unusual step of burning their garbage and avoiding any trash collection. He further stated, "It's hard to imagine that the military or police did not have any ideas what was going on inside of that." After the raid, the US asked that Pakistan identify its top intelligence operatives as it tried to establish if any of them had contact with bin Laden in the last few years.

Bin Laden was the "Golden Goose" that the army had kept under its watch but which, to its chagrin, has now been stolen from under its nose. Until then, the thinking had been to trade in the Goose at the right time for the right price, either in the form of dollars or political concessions

— Prof. Pervez Hoodbhoy, Pakistani nuclear physicist, essayist and political-defence analyst, in The Express Tribune

Mosharraf Zaidi, a leading Pakistani columnist, stated, "It seems deeply improbable that bin Laden could have been where he was killed without the knowledge of some parts of the Pakistani state."

WikiLeaks had revealed that a US diplomatic dispatch told the Americans that "many" inside Pakistan knew where bin Laden was. The document stated that "In Pakistan, Osama Bin Laden wasn't an invisible man, and many knew his whereabouts in North Waziristan, but whenever security forces attempted a raid on his hideouts, the enemy received warning of their approach from sources in the security forces."

Indian Minister for Home Affairs P. Chidambaram said that bin Laden hiding "deep inside" Pakistan was a matter of grave concern for India, and showed that "many of the perpetrators of the Mumbai terror attacks, including the controllers and the handlers of the terrorists who actually carried out the attack, continue to be sheltered in Pakistan". He called on Pakistan to arrest them.

The Globe and Mail reported local police saying that the compound belonged to Hizbul Mujahideen, a militant group supported by ISI which is fighting Indian forces in Kashmir.

In October 2011, former Pakistani Army Chief, General Ziauddin Butt has asserted that Osama bin Laden was kept in an Intelligence Bureau safe house in Abbottabad by the then Director-General of the Intelligence Bureau of Pakistan (2004–2008), Brigadier Ijaz Shah. According to him, this had occurred with the "full knowledge" of former army chief General Pervez Musharraf and possibly that of current Chief of Army Staff (COAS) General Ashfaq Pervez Kayani. However the reporter who interviewed him, Riedel, noted that Butt had "a motive to speak harshly about Musharraf". Ziauddin Butt would later deny making these claims about Musharraf and Shah.

In December 2017, former USA President Barack Obama said: "We had no evidence that Pakistani government was aware of Osama bin Laden's presence there but that is something obviously we looked at."

== Pakistan's denial ==
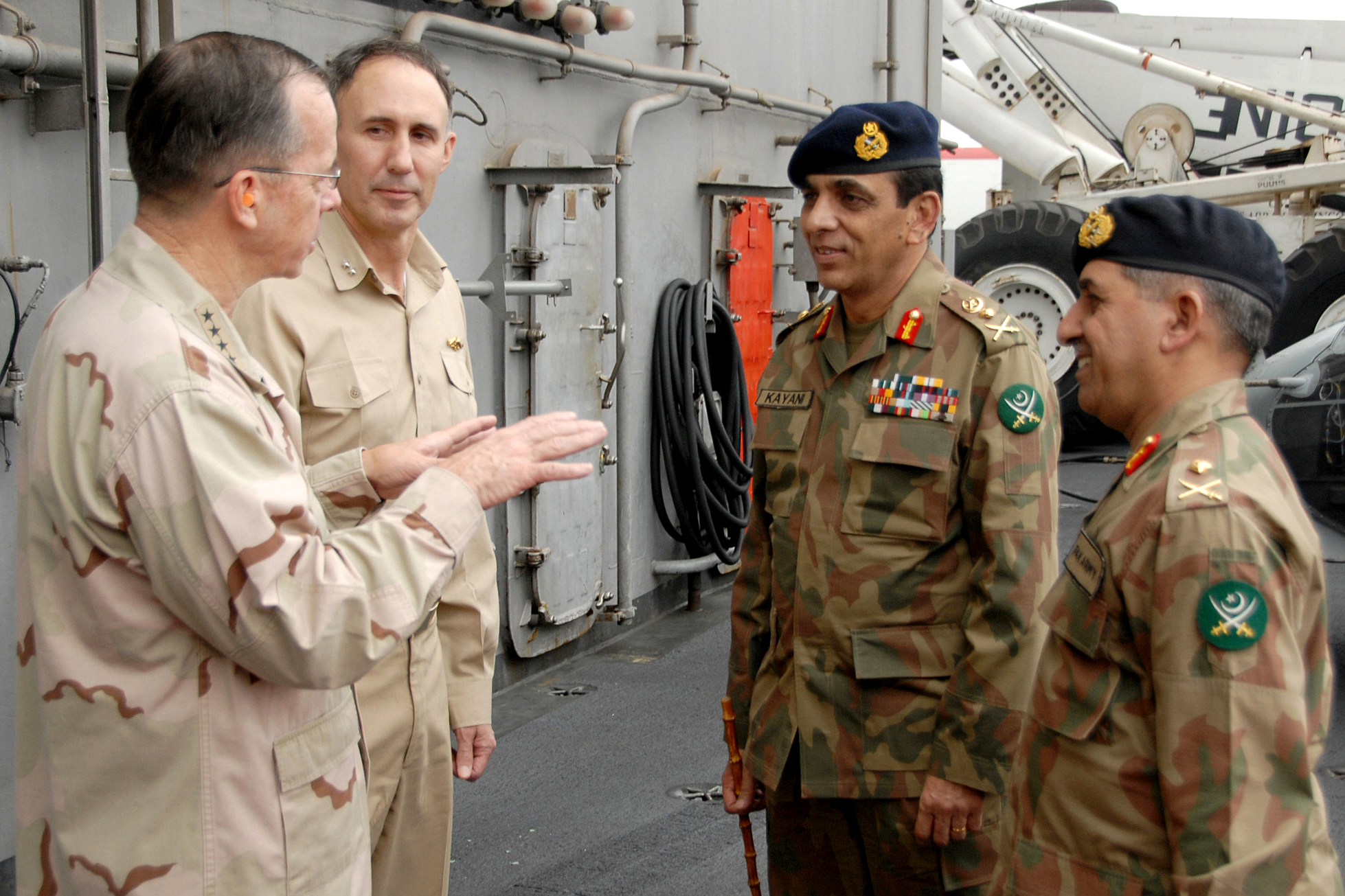
Michael Mullen, Chairman of the Joint Chiefs of Staff, talking with Ashfaq Kayani (left) and Pasha (right) to on the USS Abraham Lincoln

In a 2005 interview, the then-president Musharraf emphatically denied bin Laden was in Pakistan, stating "One thing is very sure, let me assure you, that we are not going to hide him for a rainy day and then release him to take advantage."

Pakistan's president Asif Ali Zardari denied that his country's security forces may have sheltered Osama bin Laden, and called any supposed support for bin Laden by the Pakistani government "baseless speculation." The Pakistani foreign office issued a statement that "categorically denies" media reports that Pakistan's leadership, "civil as well as military, had any prior knowledge of the US operation against Osama bin Laden."

Pakistan's former president Pervez Musharraf denied that officials in his country were responsible, calling bin Laden's presence in Pakistan a "blunder". Musharraf said instead that there was a possibility that rogue lower-level members of Pakistan's intelligence and military may have had knowledge of bin Laden's location. He conceded they might have known during the last year of his presidency six years ago, and said there ought to be an investigation.

"It's really appalling that he was there and nobody knew. I'm certainly appalled that I didn't know and that intelligence people from that time onward didn't know for 6 years that he was inside. And there is no excuse for this great, massive slip-up. And an investigation is in order and people must be punished for this big lapse." "As a policy, the army and the ISI fighting terrorism and extremism, al Qaeda, Taliban. But rogue element within is a possibility," he said.

Ahmed Shuja Pasha, the head of Pakistan's powerful Directorate of Inter-Services Intelligence (ISI), conceded that Osama bin Laden's presence in Pakistan had been an "intelligence failure" but denied his ISI could have had any role in hiding Bin Laden. "If we had shielded Osama bin Laden, why would we have killed and arrested so many al-Qaeda leaders?" he stated "Would we have hidden such a large target in such an exposed area? Without any guards or escape route?"

== Follow-up by Pakistani authorities ==
According to a BBC observer, Regardless of Pakistan's claims about their previous conduct, many outside observers have raised ongoing concerns that most of the people jailed by them since Bin Laden's killing have been those who were trying to help capture him, rather than those who helped shield him.

One such incident would be when doctor Shakil Afridi who assisted the CIA in the hunt for Osama bin Laden, was arrested several weeks after the killing of bin Laden. A Pakistani court imposed a 33-year sentence on the doctor. The doctor was eventually tried under a tribal judicial system that denies the accused the right to have an attorney or to present evidence. According to The Washington Post, the Doctor could have received the death penalty if he had been tried under normal Pakistani law.Pakistan felt that the covert US operation was a violation of its sovereignty and Dr Afridi was accused of being treasonous for this reason.

″It is now indisputable that militancy in Pakistan is supported by the ISI (Inter-Services Intelligence). Pakistan's fight against militancy is bogus. It's just to extract money from America,″ Dr Shakil Afridi stated in an interview with Fox News. He was interviewed from inside Peshawar Central Jail, where he is being held by Pakistani authorities. According to his statements, the Pakistani authorities said, 'The Americans are our worst enemies, worse than the Indians,' and he suffered ′crippling torture′ and ′psychological abuse′ during the 12 months he was held by Pakistani spy agency for helping the US.

== Abbottabad Commission report ==
A judge-led inquiry set up by Pakistani government in 2011, based on interviews with 201 sources found there was evidence of incompetence at every level in the Pakistan's intelligence and security services and it did not rule out the involvement of rogue elements within the Pakistani intelligence service. The 336-page Abbottabad Commission Report, obtained in July 2013 by Al Jazeera, blasted Pakistan's civilian and military leadership for "gross incompetence" over the bin Laden affair. It found that by 2005, Pakistani intelligence was no longer actively pursuing intelligence that could lead to his capture. The report called the handling of the bin Laden situation a "natural disaster" and even called on the leadership to apologize to the people of Pakistan for their "dereliction of duty." Al Jazeera reported that the government's intention in conducting the inquiry was likely aimed at "regime continuance, when the regime is desperate to distance itself from any responsibility for the national disaster that occurred on its watch" and was likely "a reluctant response to an overwhelming public and parliamentary demand." Lack of intelligence on bin Laden's nine-year residence in the country was blamed on "Government Implosion Syndrome." Lack of knowledge of a CIA support network without Pakistan being aware was "a case of collective and sustained dereliction of duty by the political, military, and intelligence leadership." Although the report focused on the night of the raid, it had other findings. One was that bin Laden had been living in Pakistan since 2002, after surviving the Battle of Tora Bora. Another was that he and some family members moved into the compound in Abbottabad in 2005, the same year Pakistani intelligence stopped independently looking for him.

== Statements from other countries ==
- Islamic Republic of Afghanistan: Defense ministry spokesman said that ISI must have known that bin Laden was in Abbottabad prior to the US killing him. The former chief of Afghan Intelligence, Amrullah Saleh, said he had told Pervez Musharraf in 2007 that bin Laden was hiding near Abbottabad, but Musharraf angrily shot down his claim.
- Australia: Prime Minister Julia Gillard on May 3, 2011 said bin Laden "absolutely" had a support network in Pakistan.
- India: Minister for Home Affairs, P. Chidambaram said that bin Laden hiding "deep inside" Pakistan was a matter of grave concern for India, and showed that "many of the perpetrators of the Mumbai terror attacks, including the controllers and the handlers of the terrorists who actually carried out the attack, continue to be sheltered in Pakistan". He also called on Pakistan to arrest them.
- France: Foreign Minister Alain Juppé said "I find it a little difficult to imagine that the presence of someone like bin Laden in a big compound in a relatively small town, even if located at 80 km from the center of Islamabad, could go completely unnoticed. [...] Pakistan's position [...] lacks clarity in our view, I hope that we will have more clarity."
- Tajikistan: According to US documents leaked by WikiLeaks in December 2009, the Government of Tajikistan had warned the US that efforts to apprehend Osama Bin Laden were being thwarted by Pakistani intelligence.
- United Kingdom: Prime Minister David Cameron stated: "The fact that Bin Laden was living in a large house in a populated area suggests that he must have had a support network in Pakistan. We don't currently know the extent of that network, so it is right that we ask searching questions about it. And we will." Pakistani-born British MP Khalid Mahmood stated that he was "flabbergasted and shocked" after he learned that bin Laden was living in a city with thousands of Pakistani troops, reviving questions about alleged links between al-Qaeda and elements in Pakistan's security forces.

== Impact on US–Pakistan relations ==
In 2011, the United States suspended about a third of its $2.7 billion annual defense aid to Pakistan.

In November 2018, U.S. President Donald Trump stated Pakistan helped Osama hide in the country, accusing Pakistan of not doing "a damn thing for us" and defending his administration's decision to withhold hundreds of millions of dollars in military aid to Islamabad. In an interview with Fox News aired on November 18, Trump accused Pakistan of helping to hide Osama bin Laden. He stated, "But living in Pakistan right next to the military academy, everybody in Pakistan knew he was there".

== Documents recovered from bin Laden's compound ==
During the raid on the compound, US Navy SEALs were able to recover some 470,000 computer files from a trove of ten hard drives, five computers and around one hundred thumb drives and disks. The documents recovered from the compound contained nothing to support the idea that bin Laden was protected by Pakistani officials or that he was in communication with them. Instead, the documents contained criticism of Pakistani military and future plans for attacks against Pakistani military targets. Steve Coll confirmed that as of 2019 no direct evidence showing Pakistani knowledge of bin Laden's presence in Abbottabad had been found, and that captured documents from the Abbottabad compound suggest bin Laden was wary of contact with Pakistani intelligence and police, especially in light of Pakistan's role in the arrest of Khalid Sheikh Mohammed.

== See also ==
- Allegations of CIA assistance to Osama bin Laden
- Pakistan – United States relations
- Reactions to the death of Osama bin Laden#Pakistan
- Reactions to the death of Osama bin Laden#Pro-bin Laden rallies
- Pakistan and state sponsored terrorism
