= Shahzada Zulfiqar =

President of the Pakistan Federal Union of Journalists

Shahzada Zulfiqar is a journalist based in Quetta, Balochistan in Pakistan. He is a great grandson of Khan of Kalat Khan Azam Khan Ahmadzai. He is first native journalist from Balochistan to be awarded the Presidential Pride of Performance and the first president of the Pakistan Federal Union of Journalists elected from Balochistan. He has formerly reported from Balochistan for The Nation, Newsline, Herald and served as Bureau Chief of Samaa TV. He was also elected as the President of the Quetta Press Club and the Balochistan Union of Journalists.

Zulfiqar was born in 1963 in Kalat, Pakistan, in the Ahmedzai family, known as the royal family of Kalat. He earned a master's degree in English literature in 1986 from the University of Balochistan and then started his journalistic career from the Quetta-based English daily, The Balochistan Times.
