= Voice of San Diego =

Local news organization

- Type: Daily news website (Monday through Saturday)
- Format: Online
- Owner: Nonprofit
- Founder(s): Neil Morgan, Buzz Woolley
- Editor-in-chief: Scott Lewis
- Founded: 2005
- Headquarters: San Diego, California, United States
- Website: voiceofsandiego.org

Voice of San Diego is a nonprofit news organization focused on issues affecting San Diego County, California.

== Background ==
Scott Lewis, the editor-in-chief of Voice of San Diego speaking at Politifest 2026

Voice of San Diego is an online-only local news site. Established in 2005, it was one of a number of such publications that emerged around that time in response to layoffs at traditional local print newspapers. The site is known for both its news coverage and local investigative reporting. The website is partially funded by grants, but is financed primarily on a nonprofit membership model.

Although primarily a metro-focused INN member publication, Voice of San Diego has published original reporting from other countries, with writers contributing reporting from northern Mexico and eastern Germany.

The News Revenue Hub, which helps other nonprofits adopt membership features, started as a project of Voice of San Diego in 2016. In 2017 it was spun off as an independent organization.

== Recognition ==
Voice of San Diego has won a variety of local journalism awards from the San Diego chapter of the Society of Professional Journalists for investigations exposing corruption at the San Diego Unified School District and from the San Diego Press Club.
