= American News Women's Club =

Professional organization for women in news media

American News Women’s Club
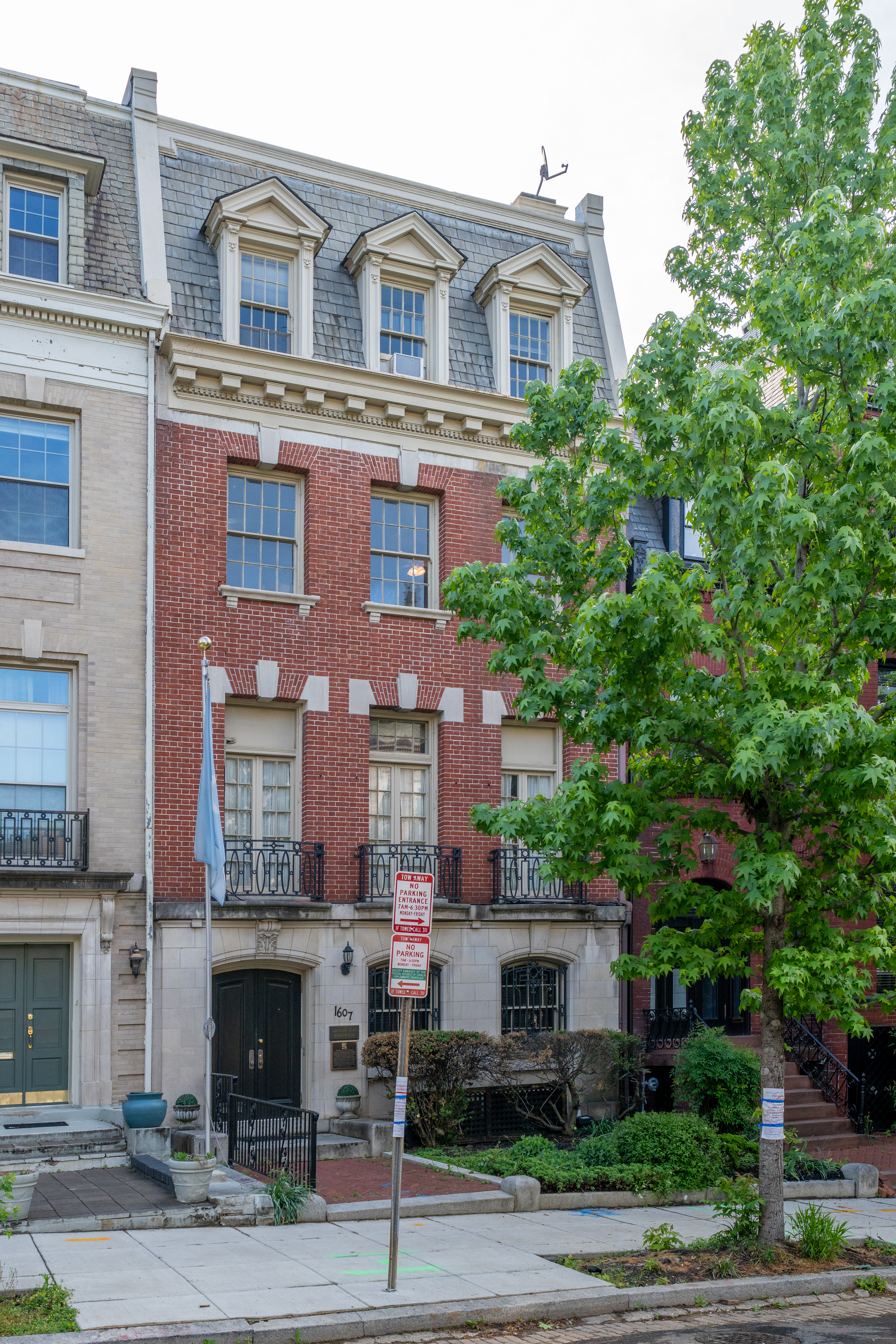
- Headquarters in Washington, D.C.
- Formation: 1932; 94 years ago
- Type: National non-profit women's press club
- Tax ID no.: 53-0217585
- Location: 1607 22nd Street NW, Washington, D.C., U.S.
- Services: Event venue
- Website: anwc.org
- Building details

General information
- Coordinates: 38.9120°N 77.0486°W

The American News Women's Club (ANWC) is one of the oldest women's press clubs in America. Its Club headquarters are located on Embassy Row in Washington, D.C. Membership includes a diverse group of journalists, independent authors and professional communicators representing newspapers, radio and television stations, new media, publishing companies, public relations firms, corporations, academic institutions and government.

Formerly known as the American Newspaper Women's Club, it was founded on April 4, 1932, by Kate Scott Brooks of The Washington Post, and other respected female journalists of the time. The women created a Club exclusively for female newspaper writers and reporters, as the National Press Club did not admit women as members at the time.

The Club also admits prominent women (Associate Members) who are deemed as helpful to women reporters gathering news. Historically among these were Amelia Earhart, Alice Marriott, Marjorie Merriweather Post, Evalyn Walsh McLean, Clare Booth Luce and Eleanor Roosevelt among many others. Until recently every first lady since Mrs. Herbert Hoover has been a member including Pat Nixon, Jacqueline Kennedy Onassis, Betty Ford and Laura Bush. The ANWC annually gives its ANWC excellence in journalism (EIJ) award to a highly respected journalist. Recipients have included Eleanor Clift, Walter Cronkite, Gwen Ifill, Norah O'Donnell, Susan Page, Diane Rehm, Wolf Blitzer, Lesley Stahl, Helen Thomas, Barbara Walters, Judy Woodruff, and Bob Woodward, EIJ recipient '22 awarded in the Club's 90th year and the 50th year since Watergate. ANWC EIJ award recipients become lifetime honorary members.

The Club is also known for its history of awarding scholarships to aspiring young women journalists from local area universities and for its signature educational, "newsmaker", authors and "Meet the Ambassadors" programs held at the Clubhouse.

The American News Women's Club was named a historic site in journalism by the National Society of Professional Journalists (SPJ) on October 16, 2002.

The Club began admitting men in the late 1970's when Art Buchwald became a member.

== See also ==
- List of women's clubs
- Newswomen's Club of New York
- Women in journalism
- Women's club movement in the United States
