= Reactions to the killing of Osama bin Laden =

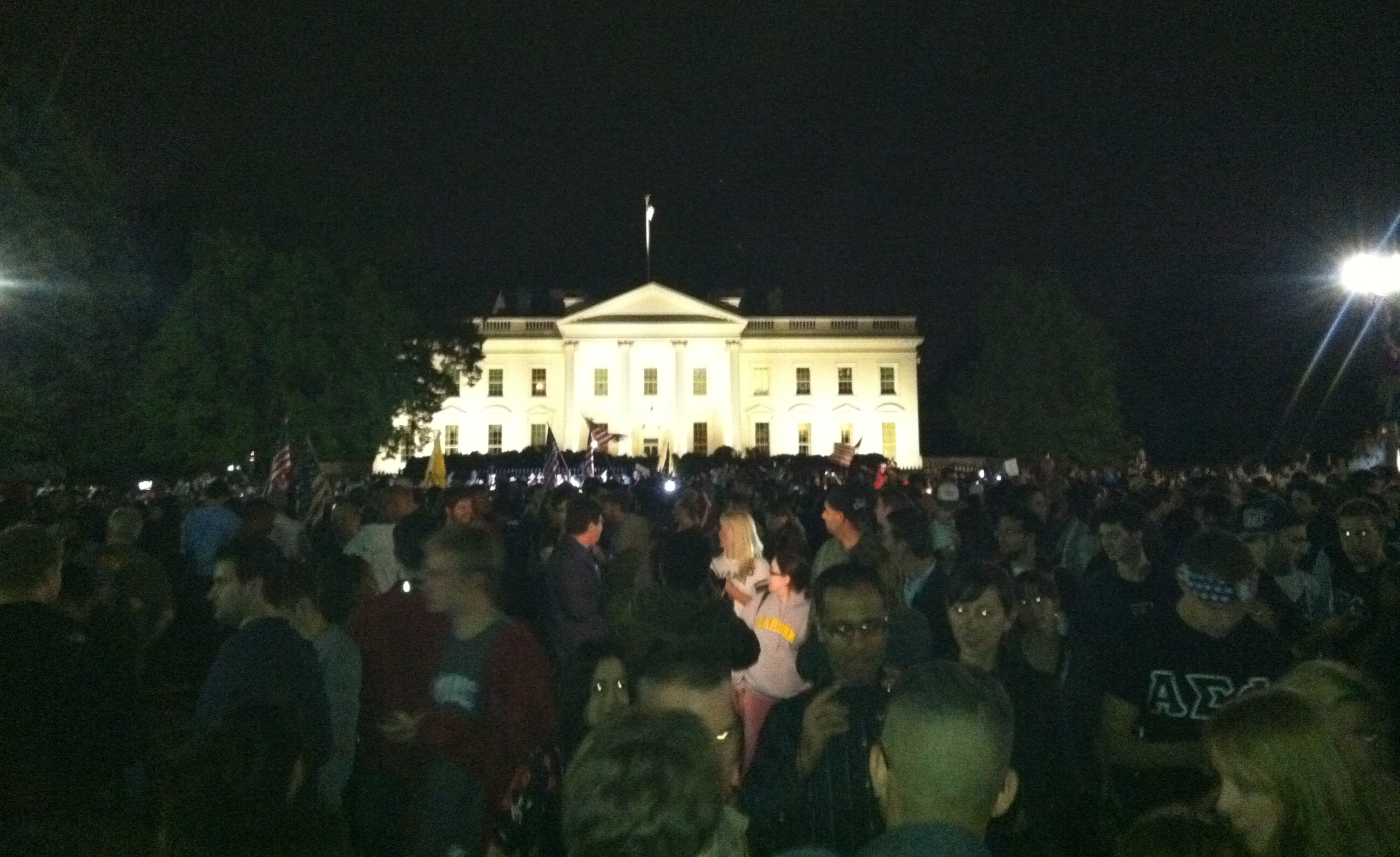
Americans celebrating in front of the White House

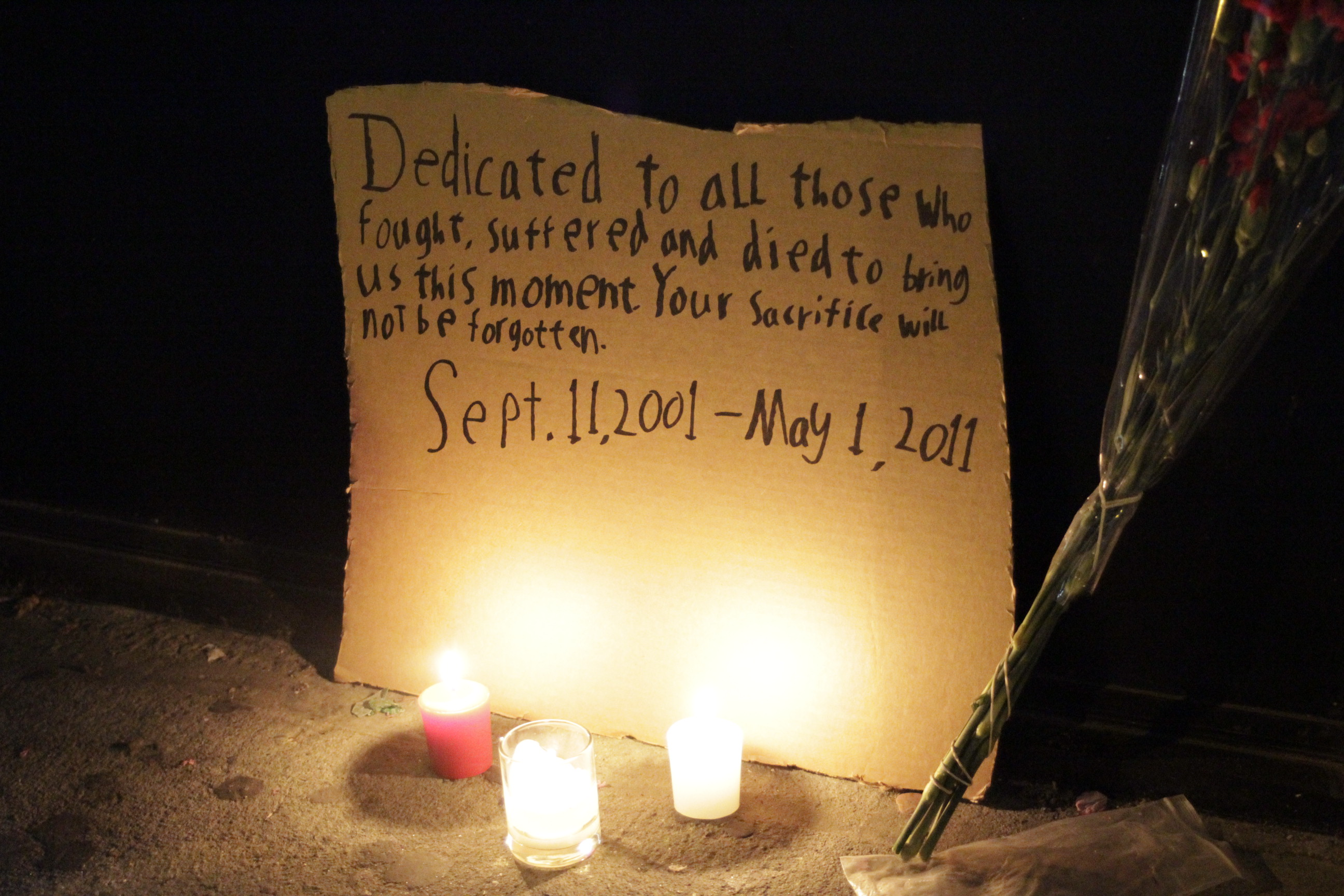
Memorial at the World Trade Center site on May 3, 2011, when the death of Osama bin Laden was announced

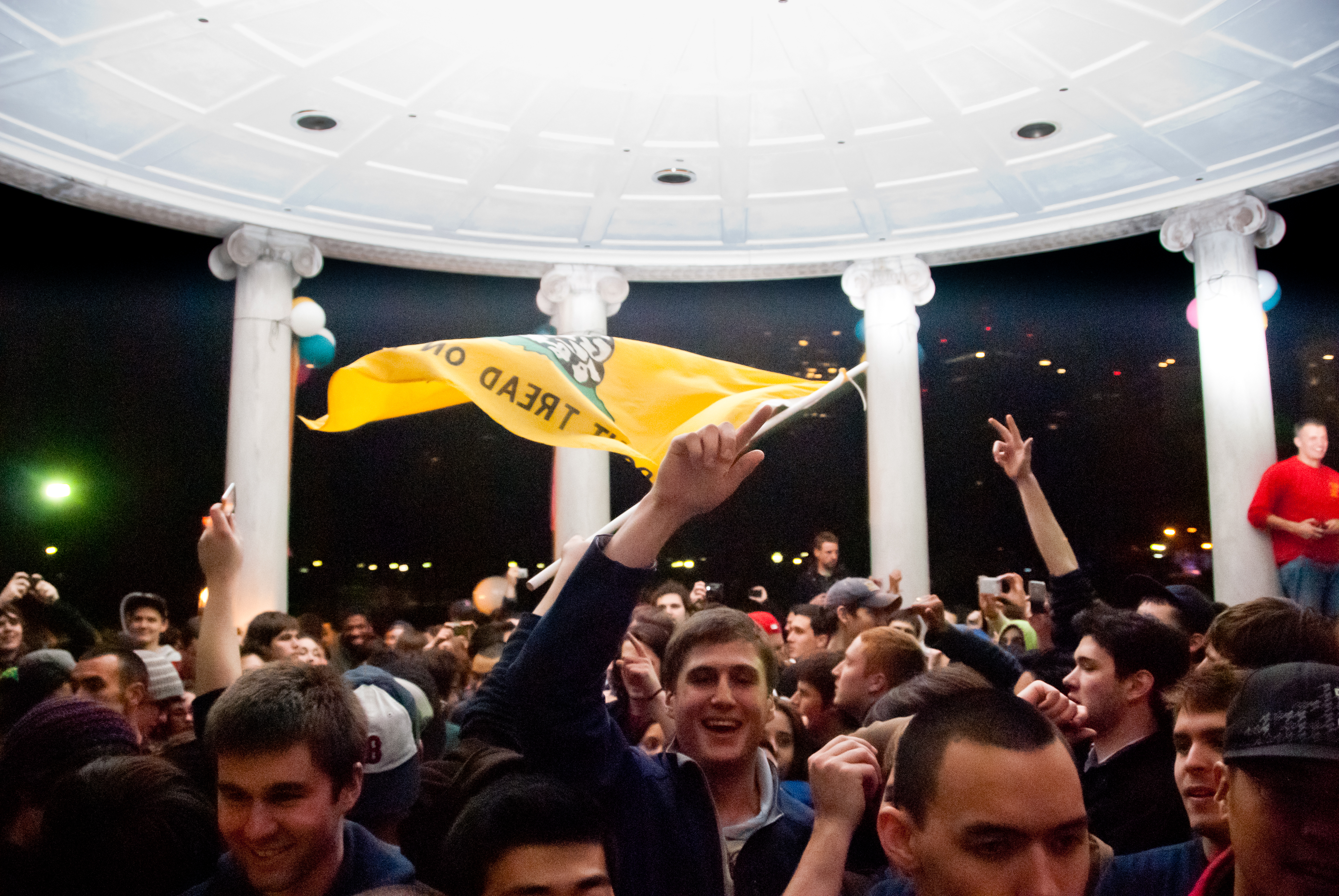
Americans celebrating with the Gadsden flag, early morning, May 2, 2011, hours after President Obama announced Osama bin Laden's death

On May 2, 2011, United States President Barack Obama confirmed that al-Qaeda terrorist Osama bin Laden had been killed in his compound in Abbottabad, northeastern Pakistan. Bin Laden's death was welcomed by many as a positive and significant turning point in the fight against al-Qaeda and related groups. Those who welcomed it included the United States, the United Nations, European Union, NATO, and some nations in Asia, Africa, Oceania, South America, and the Middle East, including Yemen, Lebanon, Saudi Arabia, India, Israel, Indonesia, Somalia, the Philippines, Turkey, Iraq, Australia, Argentina, and the rebel Libyan Republic.

His killing was condemned by terrorist organizations such as Hamas administration of the Gaza Strip, the Muslim Brotherhood, and the Taliban. Iran and the Muslim Brotherhood opined that bin Laden's death removed "the last excuse" for Western forces to remain in the Middle East, and urged their withdrawal. The monitoring of jihadist websites after bin Laden's death, by intelligence agency SITE, revealed encouragement of attacks in retaliation for his killing.

== United States ==
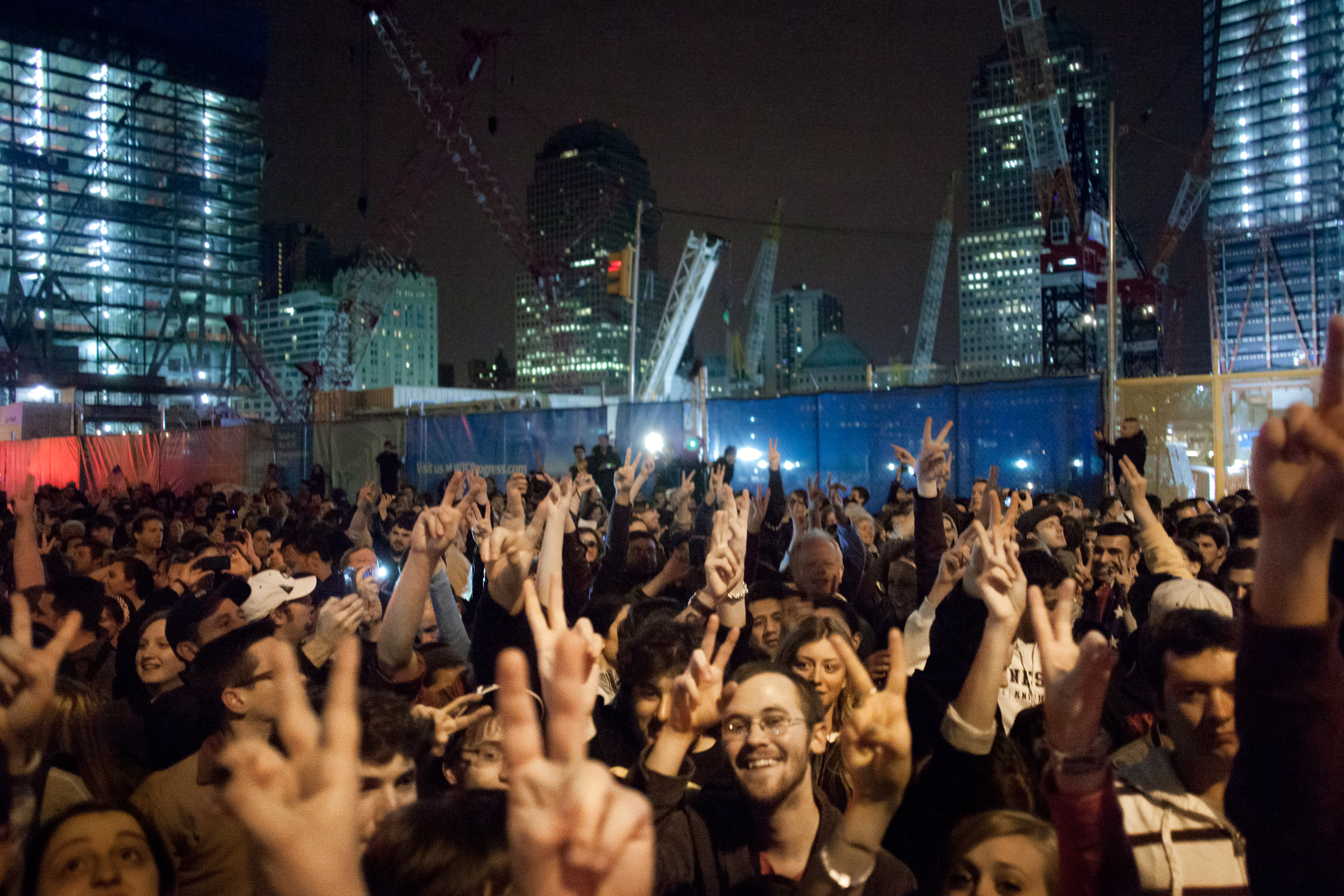
Celebratory crowd at Ground Zero following the announcement.

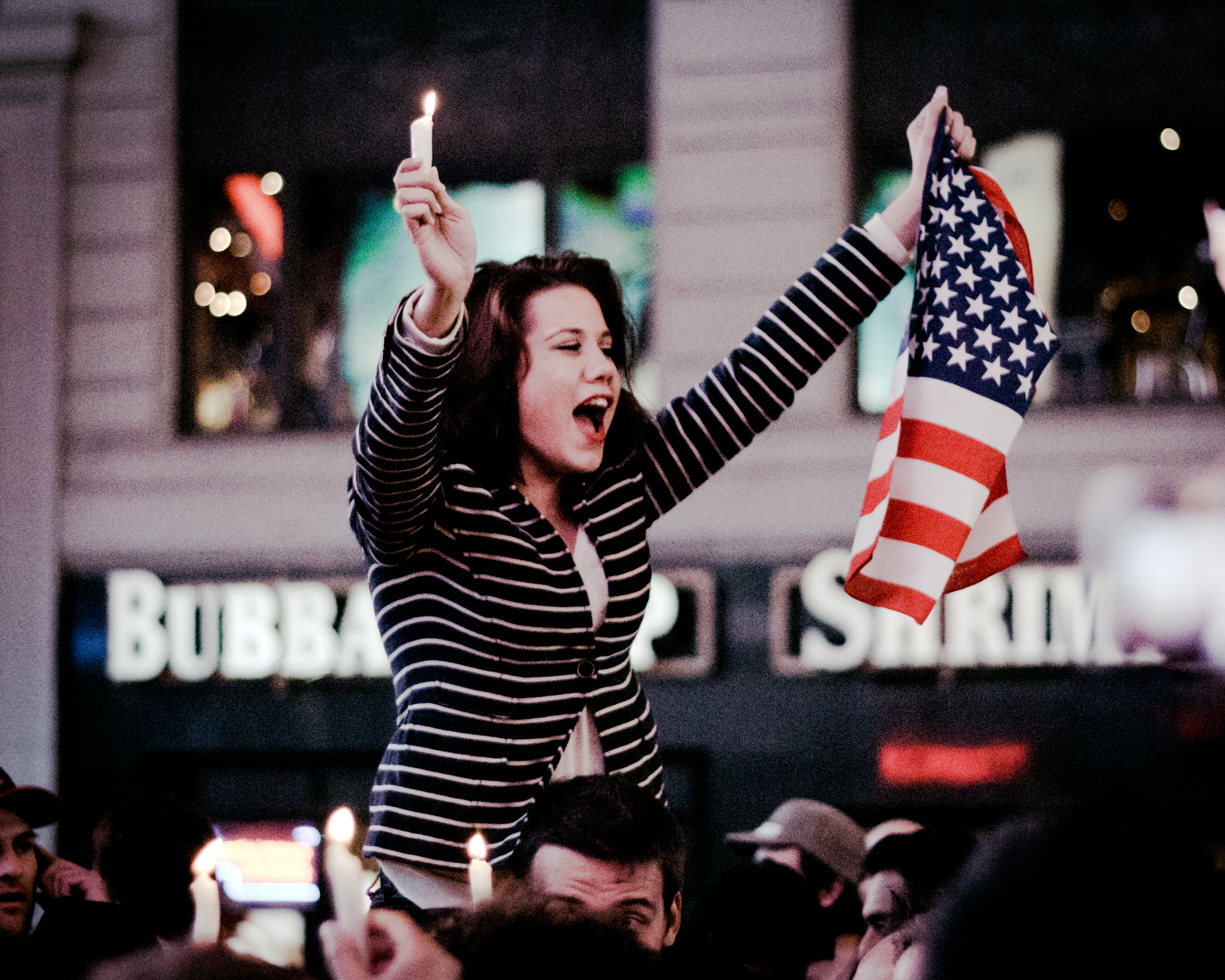
Woman in Times Square celebrating bin Laden's death.

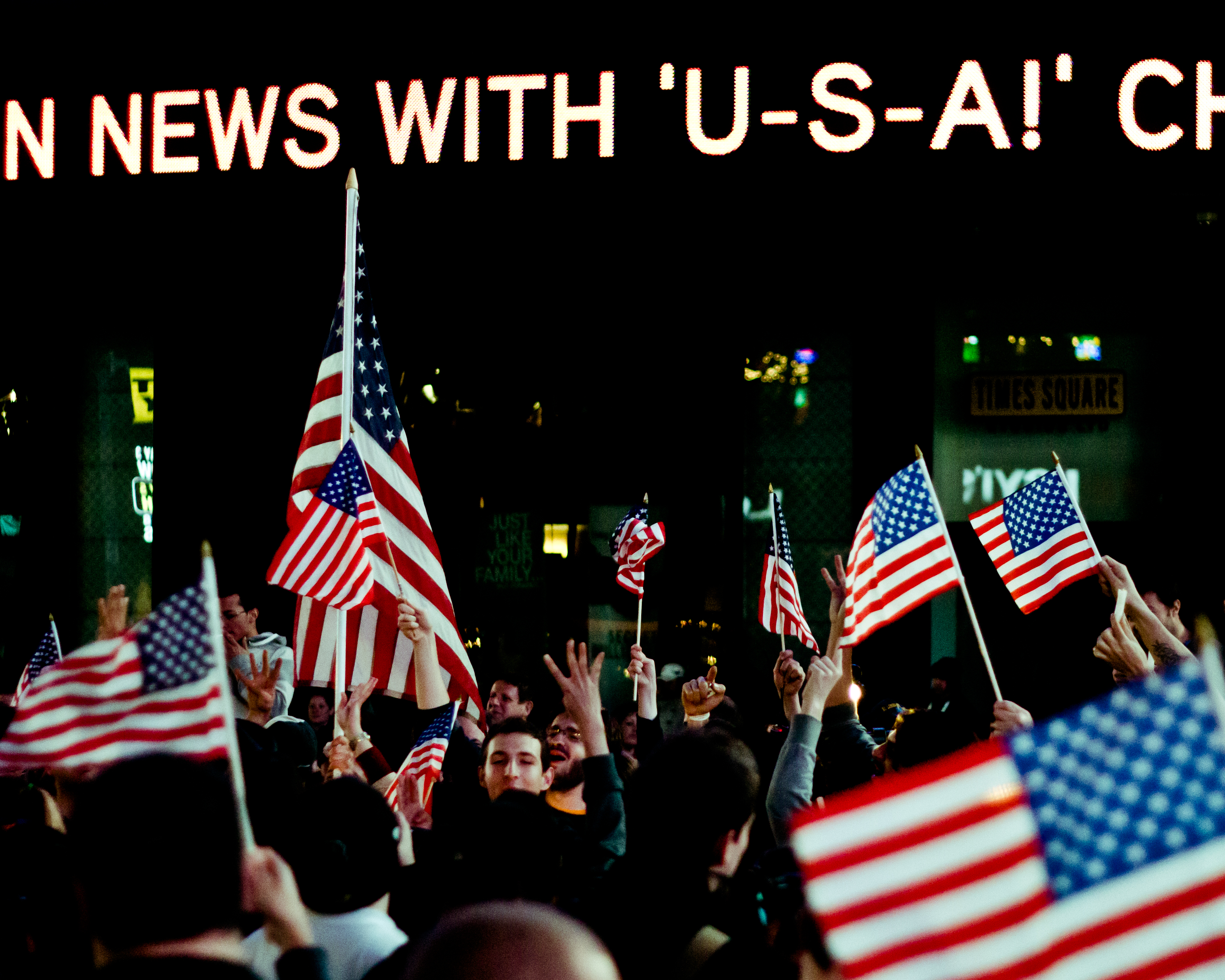
Flagwaving in Times Square on May 2, 2011

Even before the official announcement, crowds gathered spontaneously to celebrate outside the White House, where thousands assembled. Hundreds of New Yorkers also gathered in Times Square and at Ground Zero, the site of the terrorist attacks of September 11, 2001. In Dearborn, Michigan, a suburb of Detroit with a large Muslim and Arab population, a small crowd gathered outside the City Hall in celebration, many of them of Middle Eastern descent. From the beginning to the end of Obama's speech, 4,000 tweets were sent per second on Twitter.

Fans attending a nationally televised Sunday Night Baseball Major League Baseball game between two National League East rivals, the Philadelphia Phillies and the New York Mets, at Citizens Bank Park in Philadelphia initiated U-S-A! cheers in response to the news, confusing players and officials alike because no official announcement was made until later. Likewise, at WWE Extreme Rules 2011, a pay-per-view broadcast emanating from the St. Pete Times Forum in Tampa, Florida, newly crowned WWE Champion John Cena announced the news to the audience following the event's conclusion, resulting in a massive "U-S-A!" chant from the crowd. Students at Ohio State University celebrated by jumping into Mirror Lake, a tradition done before playing rivals Michigan in football. Hundreds of students at the University of Notre Dame, located in Notre Dame, Indiana, spontaneously gathered and celebrated by setting off fireworks, yelling loud chants, and running through busy student centers and libraries, many screaming the entire way through and carrying American flags. Students at the University of Southern California celebrated on USC's Greek Row, playing the national anthem and blasting fireworks. Students from many other universities, including midshipmen from the U.S. Naval Academy, also celebrated when they got the news. Indian Americans hailed the U.S. Special Forces, and accused Pakistan of sheltering bin Laden and other terrorists.

All four major broadcast television networks (ABC, CBS, NBC and Fox) interrupted their regularly scheduled programming to cover the news. Nine television networks in total carried Obama's announcement, watched by 56.5 million Americans, his largest audience since election night.

In addition to the jubilant celebrations, many visitors quietly reflected at the Pentagon Memorial.

=== Current and former officials ===
Former U.S. President George W. Bush said that "this momentous achievement marks a victory for America, for people who seek peace around the world, and for all those who lost loved ones on September 11, 2001". Former U.S. President Bill Clinton described it as "a profoundly important moment for people all over the world who want to build a common future of peace, freedom, and cooperation for our children". U.S. Secretary of State Hillary Clinton said: "The fight [against terrorism] continues, and we will never waver. I know there are some who doubted this day would ever come, who questioned our resolve and our reach. But let us remind ourselves, this is America. We rise to the challenge, we persevere, and we get the job done."

New York City Mayor Michael Bloomberg said that he hoped the death of bin Laden "would comfort those who lost loved ones" in the September 11, 2001 attacks. Former National Security Advisor and Secretary of State Condoleezza Rice characterized the news as "absolutely thrilling", adding that she was "overwhelmed with gratitude and continue[s] to be amazed at what our military has achieved". The event was also applauded by past Republican presidential contenders, including former Massachusetts governor Mitt Romney, former Minnesota governor Tim Pawlenty, and Senator John McCain. Several U.S. senators questioned whether Pakistani authorities knew about bin Laden's presence in Pakistan, and had protected him.

On May 12, 2011, former Supreme Court Justice John Paul Stevens, speaking at a Northwestern University symposium, told the audience that based on his knowledge of the facts, "It was not merely to do justice and avenge Sept. 11, [but] to remove an enemy who had been trying every day to attack the United States.... I haven't the slightest doubt it was entirely appropriate for American forces to act" as they did.

In an interview with 60 Minutes, U.S. Secretary of Defense Robert Gates said "I worked for a lot of these guys [referring to the eight U.S. commanders-in-chief he has worked for during his career]. And this is one of the most courageous calls, decisions that I think I've ever seen a president make. For all of the concerns that I've just been talking about. The uncertainty of the intelligence. The consequences of it going bad. The risk to the lives of the Americans involved. It was a very gutsy call."

On May 3, The New York Times published a Ben Ferencz letter that argued that "illegal and unwarranted execution—even of suspected mass murderers—undermines democracy".

== Pakistan ==
=== Government ===
Following the death of bin Laden, President Asif Ali Zardari convened emergency talks with Prime Minister Yousuf Raza Gilani and security chiefs in Islamabad. Gilani said: "We will not allow our soil to be used against any other country for terrorism and therefore I think it's a great victory, it's a success and I congratulate the success of this operation." Later Gilani blamed the world for their failure to capture bin Laden. President Zardari privately told President Obama that "whatever the fallout, it's very good news."

The day after the raid, the Pakistani government lashed out at the U.S., saying that the United States had taken "an unauthorized unilateral action" that would not be tolerated in the future. The foreign ministry further said, "Such an event shall not serve as a future precedent for any state, including the United States."

Foreign Secretary Salman Bashir said, "Any other country that would ever act on assumption that it has the right to unilateralism of any sort will find as far as Pak is concerned that it has made a basic mistake". He further stated that Pakistani military had scrambled F-16s after they became aware of the attack but that they reached the compound after American helicopters had left. Bashir also warned the U.S. and India against any such covert operations in the future, saying this would lead to a "terrible catastrophe".

Former Pakistani President Pervez Musharraf criticized the operation, saying, "America coming to our territory and taking action is a violation of our sovereignty, handling and execution of the operation [by U.S. forces] is not correct. The Pakistani government should have been kept in the loop."

Speaking at the Lahore Press Club, former Foreign Minister Shah Mehmood Qureshi criticised the government and openly demanded an explanation from top officials regarding the incident. He also called for President Zardari and Prime Minister Gillani to resign. Terming the American raid as "unprovoked aggression", Qureshi added that instead of addressing the nation during the crisis, Zardari instead chose to write an opinion piece in a foreign newspaper.

Cricketer-turned-politician Imran Khan said Pakistan had "lost its dignity and self-esteem" in the wake of the Osama operation and lashed out at the government and the intelligence. "The big questions that everyone began asking, and for which no answers have been forthcoming, were: who allowed the Americans to come to Pakistan and carry out this attack? And whatever happened to the Pakistani Army and its intelligence?".

In an interview in 2019, Pakistani prime minister Imran Khan claimed that Pakistani intelligence led the CIA to Osama bin Laden

"We in Pakistan always felt that we were an ally of the US and if we had been given the information about Osama bin Laden, we should have taken him out." said Khan.

=== Military ===
Pakistan's military officials declined to comment, referring questions to the foreign ministry. After the operation, Pakistan's Inter-Services Intelligence admitted that there had been an intelligence failure. An official stated that the same compound had been raided in 2003, but since then had not been monitored. However, this account was disputed by American officials who said that satellite photos show that even as late as 2004, the site was an empty field. Pakistan's Military chief Ashfaq Parvez Kayani called the operation a "misadventure" and stated that no further raids would be tolerated. In addition he announced that the number of private American military personnel in Pakistan will be reduced "to the minimum essential".

According to a statement by Pakistan Air Force Chief Marshal Rao Qamar Suleman, there had been an air-surveillance failure. Qamar covered the inquiry by saying that the air space was unable to detect the American helicopters because the radar installed on the western borders were inactive on the day of the incident. The U.S. helicopters also reportedly used radar-evading measures, such as stealth technology, to avoid detection.

=== Public ===
A poll conducted among educated respondents from Lahore, Karachi and Islamabad showed that 75% of them disapproved of the U.S. operation and 66% disbelieved that Osama Bin Laden had been killed at the compound in Abbottabad. There was also frustration and fierce criticism among the public and in Pakistani media against the military for its inability and failure in not detecting the American raid and allowing it to occur. A local resident, in reference to the security forces, commented: "This is what they are paid for, to defend the borders, not to run bakeries and banks and real-estate empires."

Numerous mobile text messages were observed doing the rounds in the country, apparently ridiculing the defence agencies for the security lapse. There was mounting public outrage against President Zardari, who offered no official remarks even five days after the incident. Zardari also left for state visits to Kuwait and Russia immediately after the operation, while Prime Minister Gillani left for a three-day state visit to France.

== China ==
=== Government ===
China said on Monday evening that the death of Osama bin Laden was "a milestone and a positive development for the international anti-terrorism efforts". Chinese Foreign Ministry spokeswoman Jiang Yu made the remarks when asked to comment on the killing of the al-Qaeda leader. China supported Pakistan amid growing questions in the U.S. about whether the country was complicit in harboring Osama bin Laden saying the, "Pakistani government's determination to fight terrorism are staunch and its actions have been vigorous." Chinese Premier Wen Jiabao discussed the issue with the U.S. in official talks. He asked the U.S. to respect Pakistan's sovereignty, and acknowledge its sacrifices in the war against terror.

=== Political analysis ===
The vice president of the University of International Relations stated that bin Laden's death, and the aftermath of such, would not affect Beijing's policies towards Islamabad. Political analyst Hasan Askari stated that while the PRC and Pakistan will remain close, China would not risk its relations with the West over it, citing technological and monetary concerns.

=== Public response ===
Public reaction in the PRC to the death of Osama bin laden was mixed. A poll from Hong Kong's Phoenix Television of 500,000 Chinese netizens had 60% of respondents agree that bin Laden's death was a sad event because "he was an anti-US warrior". However, a report from Public Radio International documented that other social media users showed sympathy to the American cause, while most Chinese on and offline did not care about his death. Further reports indicated that many others on Sina Weibo were celebrating, since his agenda had been linked to separatism in Xinjiang. Some tech-savvy Chinese activists and intellectuals even used the event to criticise, or call attention to, PRC's domestic policies.

== India ==
=== Military ===
In the wake of Operation Neptune Spear there were calls for similar strikes conducted by India against Hafiz Muhammad Saeed and Dawood Ibrahim, with Indian Army Chief General V K Singh telling reporters, "I would like to say only this that if such a chance comes, then all the three arms (of the Indian Defense Forces) are competent to do this". Indian Air Chief Marshal P V Naik said that India has the capability to carry out such surgical strikes against terrorists.

Following the death of bin Laden in Pakistan, the Border Security Force of India was put on high alert along India's 553 km border with Pakistan, in Punjab. However, a former Pakistani Air Force commander dismissed this as the rhetoric of "paper tigers", and Indian Minister for Home Affairs P. Chidambaram cautioned that India might be unable to carry out such an attack because, "We don't have our forces on Pakistani soil. We are not invited there. We don't have any support from Pakistan."

=== Public ===
The public in India celebrated the death of bin Laden across its various cities, by thanking and congratulating the United States. In the Indian capital New Delhi, crowds gathered in the streets to celebrate the occasion, thanking U.S. President Barack Obama. "Festival like celebrations" were seen in Ahmedabad, where people lit firecrackers and burned photographs of bin Laden while shouting slogans. People in the coastal town of Udupi rejoiced on Monday by exchanging greetings and distributing sweets. Celebratory crowds in Udupi, headed by the chief of Shiroor Matha, shouted slogans and burned an effigy of bin Laden. In Bangalore, over 100 members of the Sri Ram Sene converged in Freedom Park in a jubilant mood to celebrate with firecrackers and the passing out of sweets to passers-by. The news of bin Laden's death was watched by 42.6 million Indians.

=== Government ===
Prime Minister of India Manmohan Singh welcomed the news of bin Laden's death, saying, "I welcome it as a significant step forward and hope that it will deal a decisive blow to Al-Qaeda and other terrorist groups. The international community and Pakistan in particular must work comprehensively to end the activities of all such groups who threaten civilized behaviour and kill innocent men, women and children." Minister for Home Affairs P. Chidambaram said that bin Laden hiding near Islamabad was a matter of grave concern for India as evidence the country was a "sanctuary" for terrorists. He called on Pakistan to arrest "many of the perpetrators of the Mumbai terror attacks, including the controllers and the handlers of the terrorists who actually carried out the attack", who he alleged "continue to be sheltered in Pakistan".

Minister of External Affairs S. M. Krishna hailed the killing of bin Laden as "historic" and a "victorious milestone" in the global war against terrorism. The Chief Minister of Gujarat, Narendra Modi, expressed his happiness about bin Laden's death, and the Bharatiya Janata Party (BJP) also hailed the news. The BJP said that bin Laden was the most dangerous face of global and jihadi terrorism and needed to be punished for his evil ideologies and stressed that his death in Pakistan proved India's repeated assertion that "Pakistan is the epicenter of global terrorism". Senior BJP leader Sushma Swaraj (also the opposition leader in the Indian Parliament) said, "Osama was enemy number one of humanity".

== Organizations ==
=== Supranational union ===
- European Union – the European Parliament President, Jerzy Buzek said, "We have woken up in a more secure world."

=== International organizations ===
- Interpol – Interpol's Secretary General Ronald Noble congratulated the U.S. and its counterparts worldwide for the gathering and sharing of intelligence that permitted the U.S. to locate bin Laden and launch a targeted operation to bring him to justice. He stated that since the death of bin Laden does not represent the demise of al-Qaeda affiliates and those inspired by al-Qaeda, no continent or region of the world is safe from terrorism. He urged the network of Interpol National Central Bureaus and all law enforcement agencies to be on full alert for acts of retaliation from al-Qaeda if they should attempt to prove they still exist.
- The Organisation of Islamic Cooperation's Secretary General said, "Bin Laden ... was responsible for many unjustified bloodshed and attacks against innocent civilians", and emphasized the OIC's condemnation of terrorism. He stated the necessity of bringing terrorists to justice, but said that counter-terrorism activities should focus on the causes of terrorism.
- NATO – NATO Secretary General Anders Fogh Rasmussen said the killing of bin Laden is a "significant success" for the security of NATO allies.
- UN – Secretary-General Ban Ki-moon hailed bin Laden's death as "a watershed moment in our common global fight against terrorism".

=== Islamic organizations ===
- The Council on American–Islamic Relations issued a statement saying: "We join our fellow citizens in welcoming the announcement that Osama bin Laden has been eliminated as a threat to our nation and the world through the actions of American military personnel. ... Bin Laden never represented Muslims or Islam. In fact, in addition to the killing of thousands of Americans, he and Al-Qaeda caused the deaths of countless Muslims worldwide."
- The Islamic Society of North America (ISNA) said it "joins all Americans in thanking President Obama for fulfilling his promise to bring Osama Bin Laden, leader of al-Qaeda, and perpetrator of the 9/11 attacks, to justice". ISNA President Imam Magid said that the "ideology of bin Laden is incompatible with Islam".
- The Muslim American Society announced: "Justice has been served." Praying that bin Laden's death will bring solace to all families that have been victimized by al-Qaeda, President Ahmed El Bendary stated, "His crimes were against all humanity. It is correct and fair that Bin Laden should be held accountable for his crimes".
- The Muslim Brotherhood in Egypt issued a statement in which it condemned bin Laden's killing, calling it an "assassination". Muslim Brotherhood second-in-command Mahmud Ezzat, in contrast, said: "Islam is not bin Laden. After September 11, there had been a lot of confusion. Terrorism was mixed up with Islam. In the coming phase, everyone will be looking to the West for just behaviour." He added that, with bin Laden dead, western forces should now pull out of Iraq and Afghanistan.
- The Muslim Judicial Council, the largest Islamic representative body in South Africa, condemned the way in which bin Laden was killed. The council described bin Laden's death as a failure of justice, saying he should instead have been captured and put on trial, and also that the way the body was buried at sea contradicts Muslim customs and was disrespectful to a community of over a billion people.
- The Muslim Public Affairs Council expressed great relief over bin Laden's death. MPAC president Salam Al-Marayati explained: "the elimination of bin Laden represents a swift blow against terrorism." He said that he felt it was a game-changer, but that he did not "think we've achieved victory against terrorism".
- The Al-Aqsa Martyrs' Brigades in the West Bank of the Palestinian territories, the military wing of the Fatah party, was reported by the Ma'an News Agency to have mourned bin Laden's death, declaring in a statement: "The Islamic nation was shocked with the news that bin Laden had been killed by the non-believers. He left a generation who follows the education he gave in Jihad. The fighters in Palestine and around the world who have lost their leaders did not stop their mission and will continue in the tutelage of their masters. We tell the Israeli and the American occupiers that we have leaders who have changed history with their Jihad and their steadfastness. We are ready to sacrifice our lives to bring back peace." Ma'an later reported that the group's spokesman denied issuing the statement.
- An Al-Qaeda in the Arabian Peninsula member said: "This news has been a catastrophe for us. At first we did not believe it, but we got in touch with our brothers in Pakistan who have confirmed it."
- Hamas denounced the killing of bin Laden: "We condemn the assassination and the killing of an 'Arab holy warrior'. We regard this as a continuation of the American policy based on oppression and the shedding of Muslim and Arab blood." Ismail Haniyeh, a senior political leader of Hamas and one of two disputed Prime Ministers of the Palestinian National Authority, said: "We condemn any killing of a holy warrior or of a Muslim and Arab person and we ask Allah to bestow his mercy upon him." Ismail al-Ashqar, a Hamas lawmaker, called it "state terrorism that America carries out against Muslims".
  - The United States and the United Kingdom condemned Hamas for mourning bin Laden's death and referring to him as a "holy warrior". A U.S. State Department spokesman called the reference "outrageous", and British Foreign Secretary William Hague echoed that sentiment.
- A Tehrik-i-Taliban Pakistan spokesman said: "If he [bin Laden] has been martyred, we will avenge his death and launch attacks against American and Pakistani governments and their security forces... If he has become a martyr, it is a great victory for us because martyrdom is the aim of all of us."
- On May 6, Al-Qaeda confirmed the death of Osama bin Laden in a statement posted on jihadist internet forums. It said, "We also stress that the blood of the mujahid Sheikh Osama bin Laden, may Allah have mercy upon him, weighs more to us and is more precious to us and to every Muslim than to be wasted in vain." The message called upon Pakistan, where bin Laden was discovered, "We call upon our Muslim people in Pakistan, on whose land Sheikh Osama was killed, to rise up and revolt to cleanse this shame that has been attached to them by a clique of traitors and thieves who sold everything to the enemies."
- On May 13, the Pakistani Taliban claimed responsibility for a suicide bombing attack at a paramilitary academy in Charsadda, Pakistan that killed 80 people as revenge for the death of bin Laden. A spokesman for the Pakistani Taliban, Ehsanullah Ehsan, called from an undisclosed location saying, "There will be more."

=== Other religious organizations ===
- Ahmadiyya national spokesman Harris Zafar said: "As a Muslim, I am happy that a known terrorist like Osama bin Laden has been brought down and his reign of terror has come to an end. His actions ran counter to the true, peaceful, message of Islam, and he created so much mistrust and misconception of Islam. I hope other Muslims will realize that he was not a leader of Muslims. He was only a leader of extremists."

=== NGOs ===
- Amnesty International had concerns about the nature and circumstances surrounding Osama bin Laden's death. "We are seeking information from the US and Pakistani authorities about how many people were in the compound at the time of the operation, what happened to them and specifically what is the status and current whereabouts of the survivors," said Claudio Cordone, Senior Director at Amnesty International. Since he was unarmed, they raised concerns that there was no attempt to capture him alive. While condemning bin Laden for crimes against humanity, Amnesty International stressed the importance of doing so in compliance with international law.

- Pakistani and U.S. officials responded, saying there were 18 people in the compound. They report that five people were killed, and two women wounded, both of whom were left with at least six children, at the compound. Central Intelligence Agency Director Leon Panetta said that, although they were to capture bin Laden if he surrendered, they were authorized to kill. The White House reported that bin Laden resisted arrest.

- The U.N. High Commissioner for Human Rights, Navi Pillay said, "This was a complex operation and it would be helpful if we knew the precise facts surrounding his killing. The United Nations has consistently emphasized that all counter-terrorism acts must respect international law." Pillay did point out that the U.S. intended to arrest him if possible, and pointed out that taking bin Laden alive was likely to be difficult. Had he been taken to court, Pillay said that, "I have no doubt he would have been charged with the most serious crimes, including the mass murder of civilians that took place on 9/11, which were planned and systematic and in my view amounted to crime against humanity."
- Human Rights Watch stated that bin Laden's death "is a reminder of the thousands of innocents who suffer when terrorist groups seek political change through brutal means" and called on the U.S. government to release more information regarding the operation to clarify whether "it was justified under international law". HRW's Asia director said that "if [bin Laden] wasn't shooting at the soldiers, the killing should be investigated", while Kenneth Roth, HRW's executive director, criticized UN Secretary General Ban Ki-moon for calling the death an "act of justice", arguing that "even if [the killing was] justified" bin Laden was not given a trial and there was no conviction.
- The Red Cross said that if it had any issues with the operation, it would contact the governments directly, and handle the situation confidentially. It also stated that it "does not at this stage have enough facts about the operation to assess its legal and/or humanitarian implications".
- Code Pink co-founder, Medea Benjamin writing about the killing of bin Laden in the Huffington Post, says that the United States never had any "justification for invading Iraq", that there is no "justification for continuing the war in Afghanistan", and that in Pakistan, the US "drone attacks are only fueling the violence and creating more Osama Bin Ladens." And she adds, "Let us not sink into a false sense of triumphalism in the wake of Bin Laden's passing."
- Cageprisoners published an editorial written as news satire dated May 15, 2021 announcing that "American War Criminal Barack Obama has been killed by Pakistani security forces in the UK." Cageprisoners followed up with an explanation two days later: "The idea of the piece was to highlight the immorality of extrajudicial killings to those who justify and celebrate the assassination of Osama Bin Laden."

=== Media ===
Said Steve Kroft on the May 8, 2011, edition of 60 Minutes, "For more than a decade, bin Laden managed to elude the U.S. military and intelligence establishments, and he taunted three U.S. presidents. That finally ended last Sunday, and the last thing bin Laden saw was a Navy SEAL in the third floor bedroom of his compound in Pakistan." According to The Economist, "The silence of the usual critics of 'illegal', 'extrajudicial', targeted killing in the wake of America's killing of Osama bin Laden might reflect hypocrisy, sure. But this can be tough to distinguish from resignation to the fact that Mr Obama didn't submit his case for executing Mr bin Laden to some global civil authority because there isn't one and he didn't have to—because America's the biggest kid on the block and, ultimately, what America says goes. And, if it comes down to it, Britain, France, Italy, Russia and other powerful governments hope America will indulge their own kill-squad adventures with similar approving silences. Of course, if some aggrieved faction in the future seeks retribution through the targeted killing of one of these countries' leaders, that will be raw vengeance, that will be terrorism, that will be an international crime, because, like it or not, that's how it works."

George Will suggested that America could use bin Laden's death to "draw a deep breath and some pertinent conclusions", among them that "bin Laden was brought down by intelligence gathering that more resembles excellent police work than a military operation." He added, "There remains much more to al-Qaeda than bin Laden, and there are many more tentacles to the terrorism threat than al-Qaeda and its affiliates. So 'the long war' must go on. But perhaps such language is bewitching our minds, because this is not essentially war."

== Countries and territories ==
=== Africa ===
| Nation | Response |
|---|---|
| Ethiopia | Office of Communication Affairs of the Government statement: "Ethiopia feels and shares the agony and suffering of nations who lose citizens to senseless terrorist attacks... The Ethiopian Government salutes all parties involved in this operation, particularly the US anti-terrorist operatives, for hunting and destroying this unrepentant leader of an international terrorist organization. Although the death of Osama Bin Laden does not mean the end the anti-terrorist struggle, it is, nonetheless, a big victory for the global anti-terrorist forces.... [O]n this happy occasion, we congratulate the entire people of America and the Government of the United States. In our own immediate vicinity, Bin Laden's Al-Qaeda has wreaked havoc in stateless Somalia, killed and maimed many innocent people in Kenya and Tanzania, and has for years been engaged in terrorist activities aimed at destabilizing the Horn of Africa." |
| Kenya | Kenyan Prime Minister Raila Odinga said, "It's a major achievement in the war against terrorism." The Kenyan President, Mwai Kibaki, called his killing an, "act of justice to those Kenyans who lost their lives and the many more who suffered injuries" referencing the bombings in Nairobi, believed to be the work of Al Qaeda. "We should not celebrate the killing of Osama to the point where we forget to take precautions," said Joseph Kamotho, Kenyan Cabinet Minister. "The world needs to be vigilant because al-Qaida has a strong network and they may plan to retaliate." Kenyans injured in the bombings expressed relief and celebration upon hearing the news. |
| Liberia | The Ministry of Foreign Affairs issued a statement expressing the Liberian government's "profound delight" over the killing, saying that "the Liberian Government views this remarkable development as a positive achievement towards the fight against terrorism as well as the attainment and promotion of global peace and stability." |
| Libya | National Transitional Council – Colonel Ahmed Omar Bani, a spokesman for the rebel military at the time fighting against forces loyal to Libyan ruler Muammar Gaddafi, said that "We are very happy" to hear the news of bin Laden's death, and considered bin Laden as another enemy fighting against the rebels. Bani added that he wished Gaddafi would suffer the same fate as bin Laden, saying, "We want the Americans to do the same to Gaddafi." |
| Morocco | Communications Minister Khalid Naciri said that "the entire world suffered from bin Laden and the organization he created". The Moroccan government also believes that an al-Qaeda affiliated group was responsible for the April 28, 2011 Marrakech bombing. |
| Nigeria | Security consultant Evawere Oyede said that there was a "mixed" reaction in Nigeria towards bin Laden after his death. Oyede elaborated by saying, "Some people see it as a relief. While some people see it as a man who was trying to fight the Western world. Many people saw Osama as a hero." The country's Chief of Police, Hafiz Ringim, announced that Nigeria was put on red alert following bin Laden's death. |
| Somalia | Somali Prime Minister Mohamed Abdullahi Mohamed hailed the death of bin Laden by saying, "We welcome the operation which U.S. intelligence carried and killed the leader of al-Qaeda, Bin Laden, who already confessed he was the mastermind of mass killing in different places in the world." The Prime Minister also "accused Bin Laden for providing huge support to the Al-Shabaab group". He also added that "Somalia is the real victim of Osama's war ideology". Somali president Sharif Sheikh Ahmed welcomed the death of Bin laden saying he was instrumental in the problems of Somalia and that peace will prevail in Somalia as a result of the killing of bin Laden. Hundreds of Mogadishu residents rallied in the streets to celebrate the death of bin Laden, during which some people burnt the flag of al-Qaeda. |
| South Africa | The Department of International Relations and Cooperation issued a statement that the government "has noted the news of the passing on of Mr. Osama bin Laden as announced" and reaffirmed the country's support for stemming the "demon of terrorism, in all its manifestations", using "the system of global governance of multilateralism". The governing ANC's national spokesperson, Jackson Mthembu, refused to comment the news and said that the ANC will not issue a formal statement, until there is evidence of the dead body, claiming that "even President Obama hasn't seen the body". The leader of the ruling party's youth wing, Julius Malema, condemned the killing. |
| Uganda | Uganda's government described bin Laden's death as a "momentous event". Spokesman Fred Opolot pledged that "Ugandan troops in an African Union force in Somalia will continue to fight the al-Qaeda affiliated al-Shabaab militia". "The death of Bin Laden hopefully will bring about a new era," Kintu Nyango said, on behalf of the Ugandan President. "The world will become a better place." |

=== Americas ===
| Nation | Response |
|---|---|
| Argentina | President Cristina Fernández de Kirchner addressed a letter to President Obama in which she highlighted the ongoing threat of terrorism as a central issue in today's society, and expressed her wish that the news of Bin Laden's death not hinder hopes for peace in the Middle East; "Bin Laden's activities," she concluded, "are repudiated by all people and nations who truly believe in the dignity of the human condition, and we stand in support of all his victims." The Governor of Buenos Aires Province, Daniel Scioli, considered the death of Bin Laden a step forward in the war against terror; the nation's Chief of the Ministers' Cabinet, Aníbal Fernández, announced that Argentina would take the threat of counter-attacks by al-Qaeda seriously. |
| Brazil | Brazilian Foreign Minister Antonio Patriota said that, "We're very worried that there will be reprisals. We hope that this event doesn't trigger an attack." but added that it was "important and positive" with the Arab world calling for increased freedom of expression. He continued, "Insofar as Al Qaeda and Osama bin Laden were and remain behind political strategies that prioritize acts of terrorism, (the Brazilian government) can only express our solidarity with the victims and with those who seek justice." |
| Canada | Canadian Prime Minister Stephen Harper said that the death of bin Laden "secures a sense of justice for the families of the 24 Canadians murdered (on September 11, 2001)" and said that "Canada receives the news of the death of Osama bin Laden with sober satisfaction". The Canadian government also urged caution, for those Canadians in Pakistan, citing security concerns in a volatile environment. Those whose lives were affected by the September 11 attacks expressed a feeling of closure, or muted victory. |
| Chile | President Sebastián Piñera celebrated the death of bin Laden, saying he spoke with President Obama to express his satisfaction with the operation. He said he was "glad that the whole world learned that, though late, justice arrives, and that crimes committed against innocent people around the world will not go unpunished". Foreign Minister Alfredo Moreno hailed the death of bin Laden as "a very important advancement in the war against terrorism". |
| Colombia | Colombian President Juan Manuel Santos congratulated Obama, stating in a press release that the raid "proves once again that terrorists, sooner or later, always fall. In the global fight against terrorism there is only one way: to persevere, persevere and persevere." |
| Cuba | Former President of Cuba Fidel Castro stated that "whatever the actions attributed to bin Laden, the assassination of an unarmed human being surrounded by his family constitutes an abhorrent act". While criticizing bin Laden for international terrorism, he called the attack an "execution". He added that Pakistan's laws had been violated, and that its "national dignity [was] offended". |
| Ecuador | Ecuador's Foreign Minister Ricardo Patiño commented on bin Laden's death by stating, "If the United States managed to kill Bin Laden, they can celebrate it. I'm not celebrating anyone's death." |
| Mexico | Foreign Secretary Patricia Espinosa Cantellano said, "It is of great importance in efforts to free the world from the scourge of terrorism, which threatens peace and security, particularly one who leads one of the most ruthless and bloody terrorist organizations in the world." |
| Peru | Peruvian President Alan García credited the death of bin Laden to late and recently beatified Pope John Paul II, saying, "His first miracle was to remove from the world the incarnation of evil, the demonic incarnation of crime and hatred..." He also said that bin Laden's death "vindicates [former U.S. President] George W. Bush's decision to punish Bin Laden and patiently continue this work that has borne fruit". |
| Venezuela | Vice President Elias Jaua condemned the killing and subsequent celebrations, saying: "It surprises me to no end how natural crime and murder [have] become, how [they are] celebrated". He added: "At least before imperial governments were more subtle." Jaua elaborated this, stating that now the deaths, both of people working outside the law and of families of presidents (an apparent reference to Saif al-Arab Gaddafi, a target of the 2011 Libyan civil war who had been killed the day prior to bin Laden's death) "are openly celebrated by the leaders of the nations that bomb them." |

=== Asia ===
| Nation | Response |
|---|---|
| Afghanistan | President of Afghanistan Hamid Karzai, speaking on the death of bin Laden, said, "It's wonderful. It's great news", elaborating that bin Laden has "been one of the key enemies of humanity, civilization, and it's really been a major problem for the human race". He emphasized that "Afghanistan was right" in saying that "the fighting against terrorism is not in the villages of Afghanistan, not among the poor people of Afghanistan", but in "safe havens", and called on the Taliban to lay down their arms. |
| Armenia | Armenian spokesman for the Ministry of Foreign Affairs, Tigran Balayan, said: "Being involved in the struggle of the international community against terrorism, we share the feelings of Americans and all other, who fight terrorism, regarding the extermination of Bin Laden". |
| Bangladesh | The Foreign Office of Bangladesh praised bin Laden's death as "a major development" and pledged to continue its efforts in the global fight against terrorism. |
| Indonesia | Ansyaad Mbai, the head of Indonesia's counter-terrorist agency, said that bin Laden's death "would bring positive impact" and that "it would reduce movements organized by radical groups since their main figure had died". |
| Japan | Japanese Foreign Minister Takeaki Matsumoto said, "I pay respect to the US officials concerned. While his death was confirmed, it does not mean that terrorism was eliminated." |
| Kazakhstan | The Kazakh Foreign Ministry issued a statement saying that the death of bin Laden was a "major blow to international terrorism." |
| Korea | (North Korea) : The government of the Democratic People's Republic of Korea did not directly comment on the killing, despite being alleged allies of Al-Qaeda. However, according to Daily NK, Choson Sinbo, a Japanese pro-North Korean newspaper with close ties to the ruling Workers' Party of Korea, strongly condemned the act and stated “Obama ordered the secret operation personally and then declared so naturally and proudly, ‘Justice has been done.’ It is the reckless figure of an imperialist who reigns over the whole of humanity.”; (South Korea) : A spokesman for President of the Republic of Korea Lee Myung-bak said, "Our government welcomes and supports the efforts shown by the U.S. government through this operation to eradicate terrorism." |
| Malaysia | Malaysian Home Minister Hishammuddin Hussein said he hoped that the death of bin Laden would help bring universal peace and harmony. |
| Nepal | Ministry of Foreign Affairs said, "The war against terrorism has always remained a priority of Nepal's government and we take bin Laden's death as a victory against terrorism". |
| Philippines | Philippine President Benigno Aquino III praised Barack Obama and said, "The death of Osama bin Laden marks a signal defeat for the forces of extremism and terrorism", while the Philippine National Police described bin Laden's death as "a victory for all peace loving citizens and a major blow to terrorists and terrorism". Authorities in the Philippines believe that there are people who are linked to bin Laden's al-Qaeda network and may commit a retaliation attack. |
| Singapore | The Ministry of Foreign Affairs said, "the killing of Osama bin Laden ... is a significant milestone in the struggle against international terrorism." |
| Vietnam | Nguyen Phuong Nga, a spokeswoman for the Foreign Ministry of Vietnam said this when asked about the death of bin Laden, "Terrorists must bear responsibility for their acts and should be severely punished". She continued, "Vietnam will continue to join the international community in the fight against terrorism, based on the UN Charter and the basic principles of international law, to eliminate terrorism". |

=== Europe ===
==== Eastern Europe ====
| Nation | Response |
|---|---|
| Czech Republic | Czech Prime Minister Petr Nečas said that bin Laden's death "is a significant milestone in the fight against terrorism, in the effort to achieve a more secure world, though it is far from its end. It is an important symbolic message to the survivors of victims of terrorist attacks by Al-Qaeda and a clear signal to all parties without respect for law and human lives anywhere in the world: human life is irreplaceable, but its wasting won't stay unpunished." Czech President Václav Klaus said, "I accept this message about the destruction of a symbol of world terrorism, Osama bin Laden, with great relief and I believe it will significantly increase safety and create a calm atmosphere in the world." |
| Hungary | Hungarian Foreign Minister János Martonyi said bin Laden's death "is a major success in the war on international terrorism, but it doesn't mean the end of this war. A very important and determined enemy of our entire civilization has fallen." |
| Poland | The Polish Ministry of Foreign Affairs said, "Justice has been done. Congratulations to our allies. We share this moment of happiness with the American people." It further added, "Let yesterday be a reminder of what will happen to those who continue to align themselves with bin Laden and to those who continue to plan further terrorist attacks." |
| Romania | Romanian president Traian Băsescu said bin Laden's death marked the "beginning of the end" in the struggle against terrorism and called it "an extraordinary moment for what is taking place in the Arab countries", in reference to the Arab Spring. |
| Russia | "Russia was among the first countries to face the dangers inherent in global terrorism, and unfortunately knows what al-Qaeda is not from hearsay," the Kremlin said. "Retribution will inevitably reach all terrorists." |
| Ukraine | Ukrainian President Viktor Yanukovych said that bin Laden's death was "important for all countries that wish to live in the world without terrorism". |

==== Northern Europe ====
| Nation | Response |
|---|---|
| Denmark | Danish Prime Minister Lars Løkke Rasmussen said, "I congratulate President Obama and the American people with the success in finishing the era of bin Laden's unscrupulous and inhumane violence and destruction". Danish Foreign Minister Lene Espersen called bin Laden's demise a "great symbolic victory", but warned that the war on terror had not yet ended. |
| Finland | President of Finland Tarja Halonen said, "Hopefully this is the end of an era." She also commented on the importance of the international community to create a system which would be constructive and build on co-operation. |
| Ireland | Taoiseach Enda Kenny said the removal of bin Laden's ability to plot heinous acts is a major achievement in the effort to rid the world of the threat of terrorism. |
| Norway | Norwegian Foreign Minister Jonas Gahr Støre called the death of bin Laden "a break-through in the fight against terror", but insisted that the threat from al-Qaeda remained. |
| Sweden | Swedish Foreign Minister Carl Bildt wrote a tweet saying that "a world without Osama Bin Laden is a better world. His hatred was a threat to us all". |
| United Kingdom | Prime Minister David Cameron said that bin Laden's death would "bring great relief" around the world. Former Prime Minister Tony Blair said that "the operation shows those who commit acts of terror against the innocent will be brought to justice, however long it takes. This is a huge achievement in the fight against terrorism, but we know the fight against terrorism and the ideology that Bin Laden represents continues and is as urgent as ever." Labour Party and opposition leader Ed Miliband stated that "the world is a safer place with the death of Osama bin Laden because he is no longer there to command and encourage terrorism". Ken Livingstone, the former Mayor of London, criticized Obama for having Bin Laden assassinated rather than captured alive. He stated that the killing would increase the chance of terrorism, although many disagree with Livingstone's remark. |

==== Southern Europe ====
| Nation | Response |
|---|---|
| Albania | The President of the Republic, Bamir Topi, through a message conveyed to the President of the United States of America, Barack Obama, commends the elimination of Osama bin Laden, by considering it as one of the greatest victories in the war against international terrorism. "Please allow me to congratulate you on the completion of the mission justice restored, with the final elimination of Osama Bin Laden by American troops, thus achieving one of the most important victories in the long and difficult war against international terrorism! As President of the Republic of Albania, on behalf of the Albanian nation, I would like to express my most sincere congratulations for the achievement of this objective that gave me joy and at the same time made me proud that my country is lined up on the side of the greatest ally and friend of Albania; the United States of America, the country that believed in the war without compromise against evil, against terrorism, by defending the holy principles of freedom and democracy all over the world, as well as ensuring the security, peace and stability in all parts of the world. Allow me, Mr. President, on behalf of the Albanian people and me personally, to express to you once more the best wishes for this great victory and at the same time to ensure you that Albania will continue to complete with devotion its engagements in the framework of NATO, by giving its own contribution in the future challenges for freedom, democracy, as well as in constructing a better world for the nations and their future"! – emphasizes the message of President Topi." Prime Minister Sali Berisha reacted today to the Al-Qaeda leader also the mastermind of terrorist acts, Osama Bin Laden, being killed by the US forces in Pakistan and appreciated it as a great victory of the USA over terrorism. Speaking to reporters, PM Berisha said that Bin Laden got what he deserved and emphasized that his death relieves the pain of thousands of September 11 victims. Berisha said "Today's headline of the international news is elimination of one of the blackest figures of the history of mankind. It's the death of the man who by his primitiveness and aggressive behavior took the lives of thousands of people in New York, but even in other countries worldwide; they were innocent people, on whom this cruel man, Bin Laden, wanted to realize his medieval and the most inhuman ends. But, now he got the deserved response while hidden in his den for years. This marks a great victory of the United States of America, President Barack Obama; it's the victory of peace and all those who consider terrorism the number one enemy of peace and their freedom. This is the most consoling news for families of thousands of innocent victims of the attacks that the chief terrorist Osama Bin Laden masterminded in many countries of the world." The Ministry of Foreign Affairs of the Republic of Albania hails the elimination of the arch-terrorist Osama Bin Laden during a successful operation conducted by US forces. On this day, the Albanian people joins the feelings and the solidarity of the peoples of the whole world, who have suffered from the unparalleled acts perpetrated by international terrorism, including the one on 11 September. As one of the first countries to join the alliance against international terrorism, Albania expresses the confidence that the unwavering stance in encountering these terrorist acts and their masterminds is the key to the success of our common struggle to uphold peace and freedom worldwide. |
| Bosnia and Herzegovina | Bosnia and Herzegovina Minister of Security, Sadik Ahmetović said that the news of bin Laden's discovery and death was "received with relief". Ahmetović added that "terrorism is the evil of modern times whose victims are mainly innocent civilians so we have to fight it with all means". |
| Croatia | Croatian president Ivo Josipović in interview to Croatian Radio Television said that: "Death of Osama Bin Laden makes a great victory in fight against terrorism". He emphasized that despite Bin Laden's death fight still isn't over, and Croatia will remain committed to it just like entire progressive world. Croatian Prime Minister Jadranka Kosor stated that Croatia is member of antiterorist coalition, fight against terrorism is imperative for everyone, and that her government is "taking certain measures" in that context. Croatian Minister of Interior Tomislav Karamarko said that upon death of Bin Laden, security in Croatia is on high-quality level. |
| Cyprus | Following the news and the statements made by Obama, the Cyprus Police have increased their security measures for the protection of potential Western and US targets within their country. A spokesman for the Cyprus Police, Michalis Katounotos, stated that "the force has adopted additional security measures in the event of new terrorist activities or reaction to the death of bin Laden." |
| Greece | Greek Foreign Minister Dimitris Droutsas made the following statement: "International terrorism is an abhorrent phenomenon, a constant threat to international peace and security that undermines the prospects of societies throughout the world for prosperity and development. Osama Bin Laden's death dealt a strong blow to terrorism. But the fight does not end here. The international community – irrespective of religious beliefs and political considerations – needs to remain united in the international effort to end this scourge." |
| Italy | Prime Minister Silvio Berlusconi said of bin Laden's killing, "This is a great outcome in the fight against evil, in the fight against terrorism, a great outcome for the United States and for all democracies." Minister of Foreign Affairs Franco Frattini hailed the killing of bin Laden as "a great victory" for the U.S. and the international community as a whole in the struggle against al-Qaeda and terrorism. The Minister has praised U.S. officials for the operation. Minister of the Interior Roberto Maroni said that "Bin Laden's elimination is a good news" and he shared Interpol chief's concerns about risks of immediate terrorist reactions. |
| Macedonia | The Macedonian government praised the death of bin Laden as "a victory for justice and is a big success and a big step forward in the attempt to make a safer world and eliminate the terror threats against humanity". |
| Malta | The Maltese government said in an official statement: "Osama bin Laden was responsible for some of the worst terrorist attacks in recent history that cost the lives of thousands of innocent people. We hope that the world will be safer place to live in and that the international community will continue to strive to combat the scourge of extremism and to build a world of peace, security and prosperity for all." |
| Portugal | The President of Portugal, Aníbal Cavaco Silva, sent a message to the U.S. President in which he expressed his solidarity with the feelings of the American people when the outcome of the military operation of which ended with the death of bin Laden became known. |
| Spain | Prime Minister of Spain José Luis Rodríguez Zapatero sent a telegram to Barack Obama to expressed "in name of [his] Government and the Spanish society, the satisfaction shared with the American people for the result of the anti-terrorist operation which led to bin Laden's death. Satisfaction for the meaning it has as a decisive and determining step in fighting Al-Qaeda's terrorism. Satisfaction inseparable of the memories of the victims caused by the horrible terrorist strikes which will never leave our memory. Spain will stay fully committed with the International Community in fighting terrorism." |
| (Vatican City) Holy See | Vatican spokesman Fr. Federico Lombardi said that bin Laden "was gravely responsible for promoting division and hatred between peoples, causing the end of countless innocent lives, and of exploiting religions to this end. Faced with the death of a man, a Christian never rejoices, but reflects on the serious responsibility of each and every one of us before God and before man, and hopes and commits himself so that no event is an opportunity for further growth of hatred, but for peace". |

==== Western Europe ====
| Nation | Response |
|---|---|
| Austria | Austrian Foreign Minister Michael Spindelegger welcomed the news, calling it "a relief for many people", but warned that it must not be interpreted as a "final victory over terrorism". |
| Belgium | Belgian resigning Prime Minister Yves Leterme said, "Many people have a sense of relief, especially the victims of the attacks. One would normally expect a trial, but I think this is a good solution, given what happened in the past on the initiative of Osama bin Laden." |
| France | French Foreign Minister Alain Juppé said that bin Laden's death is a "victory for all democracies fighting the abominable scourge of terrorism". He went on to say, "France, the United States and European states work closely together to fight terrorism, so I'm overjoyed at the news." |
| Germany | German Foreign Minister Guido Westerwelle said, "That a stop could be put to this terrorist's bloody trade is good news for all peace-loving and free-thinking people in the world." German Chancellor Angela Merkel expressed joy that bin Laden had been successfully killed, a statement that drew some criticism in Germany. |
| Netherlands | Dutch Prime Minister Mark Rutte praises the courage and the determination that people showed during the mission. He further says that this is a major blow to the al-Qaeda network. He has presented his compliments to President Obama but also said this is not the end of terrorism. |
| Switzerland | Jacques Baud, a Swiss security expert, says the killing of Osama bin Laden won't necessarily lead to a speedier withdrawal of foreign troops from Afghanistan. But said that "his death is seen as a major victory over terrorism." |

=== Middle East ===
| Nation | Response |
|---|---|
| Iran | Foreign Ministry spokesman Ramin Mehmanparast said bin Laden's death meant that the "US and their allies have no more excuse to deploy forces in the Middle East under (the) pretext of fighting terrorism". He hoped that the killing would "establish peace and security in the region", adding that it is Iran's policy to "strongly condemn terrorism all over the world". Alaeddin Boroujerdi, head of the Iranian Parliament's foreign policy commission, stated, "If it is true, then the killing of bin Laden 10 years after the September 11 incident is no big deal." Heyder Moslehi, the Iranian Intelligence Minister, said that bin Laden had died before the raid: "We have exact information that indicates that bin Laden had died from an illness some time ago", "Why didn't (the White House) show his body? Why did they throw it into the sea?" |
| Iraq | Foreign Minister of Iraq Hoshyar Zebari said that "Baghdad is delighted by the news that Osama bin Laden has been killed". He mentioned that "thousands of Iraqis had died because of his ideologies". |
| Israel | Israeli Prime Minister Benjamin Netanyahu said that bin Laden's death was a "resounding triumph for democratic nations fighting terrorism". Shaul Mofaz, chairman of the Knesset's Foreign Affairs and Defense Committee, said that the killing of Osama bin Laden bears witness to the fact that the US has adopted the Israeli strategy of targeting terrorist leaders....Mofaz said that the strategy was originally employed by Israel following the murder of nine Israeli athletes at the 1972 Munich Olympics. |
| Lebanon | Former Lebanese Prime Minister Saad Hariri said, "Murderers and villains deserve such a fate and the fight against all its [terrorism] shapes and forms should not stop and is first and foremost the responsibility of Arabs and Muslims who have the duty of liberating Islam from its kidnappers", and "the history of our nationalism and Islam will never forgive that man who was a black mark for two decades, filling the minds of youngsters with ideas about terrorism, murder and destruction". |
| Saudi Arabia | The Saudi Deputy Interior Minister, Prince Ahmed bin Abdul-Aziz Al Saud, was cited on TV: "Saudi Arabia hopes that the elimination of the leader of the terrorist al-Qaeda organisation will be a step towards supporting international efforts aimed at combating terrorism and dismantling its cells". Saudi Prince Alwaleed bin Talal praised the U.S. forces' success in killing bin Laden, stating the terrorist leader's demise was "a plus not only for the U.S. but for the whole world," and characterized Barack Obama's approach to the region in general as "very prudent". |
| Turkey | President Abdullah Gul welcomed the news of bin Laden's death, and said, "It should teach a lesson to terrorist organisations of the world; that the leader of the world's most dangerous and sophisticated terrorist organization is captured this way." |
| United Arab Emirates | UAE's Assistant Foreign Minister for Political Affairs, Tariq Al-Haidan, said that bin Laden's death "will strengthen efforts of international community in combating terrorism". He added that terrorism had deteriorated the image of Islam and Muslims worldwide and that the "death of the Al-qaeda leader does not mean an end to Al-qaeda or terrorism". |
| Yemen | A government official described bin Laden's death as "a truly historic moment". "We welcome the news ... millions of people will sleep in peace tonight. Osama bin Laden was more of a symbolic figure, a spiritual leader for al-Qaeda. But this is definitely a strong blow to the organization," said the official, who did not want to be named because he is not authorized to talk to the media. |

=== Oceania ===
| Nation | Response |
|---|---|
| Australia | Australian Prime Minister Julia Gillard welcomed the news of bin Laden's death, by saying: "Osama bin Laden declared war on innocent people and today he has paid the price for that declaration. Osama bin Laden was directly responsible for despicable acts of violence against innocent people and he inspired acts of violence by others. Today of all days we remember the lives lost, particularly the lives of Australians." She also said it was "a small measure of justice", but stated that the "War on Terror is not over", and "must be continued". |
| New Zealand | New Zealand Prime Minister John Key stated that "the world is a safer place without Osama bin Laden", but "bin Laden's death may not mean an end to terrorism". |

=== Countries with partial recognition ===
| Nation | Response |
|---|---|
| Kosovo | The President of Kosovo, Atifete Jahjaga, said, "Terrorist Osama Bin Laden took the deserved punishment after all the killings, suffering, pain and damage he inflicted on the world. Justice was put into place. The good won against evil. People will live in peace, progress, fearless and safe. The war against international terrorism is in function of peace, prosperity, security for all, in defense of life and human dignity." |
| Palestinian Authority | Hamas, the government of the Gaza Strip, denounced the killing of bin Laden: "We condemn the assassination and the killing of an 'Arab holy warrior'. We regard this as a continuation of the American policy based on oppression and the shedding of Muslim and Arab blood." Ismail Haniyeh, a senior political leader of Hamas and one of two disputed Prime Ministers of the Palestinian National Authority, said: "We condemn any killing of a holy warrior or of a Muslim and Arab person and we ask Allah to bestow his mercy upon him." Ismail al-Ashqar, a Hamas lawmaker, called it "state terrorism that America carries out against Muslims". The United States and the United Kingdom condemned Hamas for mourning bin Laden's death and referring to him as a "holy warrior". A U.S. State Department spokesman called the reference "outrageous", and British Foreign Secretary William Hague echoed the sentiment. The spokesman for the rival party, Palestinian People's Party, Ghassan Khatib said: "Getting rid of Bin Laden is good for the cause of peace worldwide, but what counts is to overcome the discourse and the methods – the violent methods – that were created and encouraged by Bin Laden and others in the world". |
| Republic of China (Taiwan) | The ROC government raised the terror alert levels across the ROC (Taiwanese) territories, including the island of Taiwan, after learning about bin Laden's death. Also, President Ma Ying-jeou said that "this is a huge progress for the international counter-terrorism movement." Vice Premier Sean Chen, along with the Ministry of Foreign Affairs, echoed that statement. |

== Individuals ==
- The scope of international interest in this incident can be illustrated with over three million tweets about bin Laden's death released by various individuals as of May 7, 2011. Twitter has protested when researchers attempted to analyze that data.
- The 14th Dalai Lama said, "Forgiveness doesn't mean forget what happened. … If something is serious and it is necessary to take counter-measures, you have to take counter-measures."
- Rowan Williams, the Archbishop of Canterbury, said "it doesn't look as if justice ... is done," concerning the killing of an unarmed man. He elaborated, "I don't know full details any more than anyone else does. But I do believe that in such circumstances when we are faced with someone who was manifestly a war criminal, in terms of the atrocities inflicted, it is important that justice is seen to be observed."
- Salman Rushdie – novelist and essayist, said: "It is time to declare Pakistan a terrorist state and expel it from the community of nations." Rushdie asked whether the world is to believe Pakistan when it professes its ignorance about Osama's presence on its soil in the very town housing its elite military academy. He stated: "In the aftermath of the raid on Abbottabad, all the big questions need to be answered by Pakistan."
- Noam Chomsky – scholar in the field of linguistics as well as an anarchist and libertarian socialist, said: "We might ask ourselves how we would be reacting if Iraqi commandos landed at George W. Bush's compound, assassinated him, and dumped his body in the Atlantic. Uncontroversially, his crimes vastly exceed bin Laden's, and he is not a 'suspect' but uncontroversially the 'decider' who gave the orders to commit the "supreme international crime differing only from other war crimes in that it contains within itself the accumulated evil of the whole" (quoting the Nuremberg Tribunal) for which Nazi criminals were hanged: the hundreds of thousands of deaths, millions of refugees, destruction of much of the country, the bitter sectarian conflict that has now spread to the rest of the region."
- Henry Kissinger, former advisor to Presidents Nixon and Ford, commended President Obama on the matter. He pointed out that, "Operationally, the general view seems to be that bin Laden was not in active operational control anymore. But symbolically, as the head of the movement, his death has a blighting effect." He indicated that relations with Pakistan will be difficult, but that there should be an increase in Pakistan's role in America's foreign policy. He urged Obama to think critically about how this affects the war in Afghanistan, but said, "[o]n the whole, I think that it has been an extremely positive development."

== Pro-bin Laden rallies ==
Pakistan

- On May 2, around 1200 supporters of the Taliban attended a rally in the Pakistani city of Quetta to pay homage to Osama bin Laden, chanting "death to America" and setting fire to a U.S. flag, witnesses and organisers said. One of the demonstrators, Asmatullah said: "Bin Laden was the hero of the Muslim world and after his martyrdom he has won the title of great mujahed (Muslim fighter)."
- On May 4, hundreds of people in the city of Multan, marched through the streets in a pro-bin Laden rally, protesting the killing of bin Laden by U.S. Special Forces. The crowd held placards and burned U.S. flags.
- On May 5, Pakistan's biggest and most influential political Islamist party Jamaat-i-Islami, held a pro-Bin Laden rally in Islamabad chanting anti-American, anti-Israeli and anti-Indian slogans.
- On May 5, 150 Pakistani lawyers in Peshawar, describing themselves as "followers" of bin Laden, prayed for him outside the Peshawar High Court. Organizer Gul Nabi said that "bin Laden was as a martyr and this prayer was not offered anywhere. It was an Faraz-e-Kafaya (Islamic obligation) so we performed this and we did this just to complete this Namaz-e-janaza (funeral) for all those Shaheeds (martyrs) who were killed in Abbottabad." After the prayers, the lawyers chanted anti-American slogans.
- On May 6, mass crowds gathered in Kuchlak, held a pro- bin Laden rally, headed by the political party Jamiat Ulema-e-Islam. The demonstrators carried picture of bin Laden and burned a U.S. flag.
- On May 7, religious and religio-political parties held demonstrations and rallies outside mosques after Friday prayers across Pakistan including Lahore to protest against the growing U.S. interference, drone attacks, Abbottabad operation and the resultant killing of bin Laden. During Friday prayers, imams termed the war on terror as war against Islam and Muslims, they also stressed that Islamic countries should unite to fight against a common enemy. A mammoth rally was also held in Mansoora, Lahore, the headquarters of Jamat-e-Islami against the U.S. operation, where the ameer of Jamaat-e-Islami Syed Munawar Hasan was also present and warned "Washington and her allies" that terrorism would not come to an end through a war against Islam and the Muslims.

Palestinian Authority

- On May 2, dozens of Palestinian Arab residents of Silwan in East Jerusalem held a rally in support of Osama bin Laden. Some demonstrators threw stones at Israel Police officers. Ynet noted that bin Laden had made various statements in support of the Palestinians and against Israel, had declared that Muslims were engaged in a war against Jews, and had criticized the United States for "its support of Israel and the ongoing occupation in Palestine".
- On the day after bin Laden's death, 25 people, including al-Qaeda sympathizers and students, gathered for a rally outside a Gaza City university. Some said they opposed bin Laden's ideology, but nonetheless considered him a martyr and were angry at the U.S. for killing him.
- On May 7, dozens of Salafists Islamists gathered in the main square of Gaza City to protest against bin Laden's killing. The demonstrators, chanting "We warn you America, we warn you Europe", held posters of bin Laden along with banners reading "We are all your soldiers Osama" and "Osama is alive inside us." The protest was broken up by Hamas police. Reuters noted that while Hamas itself had denounced the killing of bin Laden as well, it had recently engaged in gun battles with Gazan Salafist groups.

Sudan

- On May 3, around 1,000 people rallied in Khartoum, Sudan, to praise bin Laden, chanting "Death to America". The gathering was attended by junior members of the ruling northern National Congress Party. The rally consisted of a prayer and several speeches by radical Sunni Muslim clerics who praised bin Laden and called on Arab leaders to fight the US. Sheikh Abu Zaid Mohammed Hamza declared: "Islam is calling to fight against the USA because it supports Israel and the Jews... We hope that all Arab presidents will become like Osama bin Laden." Sheikh Abdul Hai Youssuf said that "Osama bin Laden is our brother".

Turkey

- On May 6, about 200 people rallied at the Fatih Mosque in Istanbul, by protesting the killing of bin Laden by U.S. commandos. After Friday prayers, the demonstrators gathered at the call of Islamist newspaper Millî Gazete, and with the support of the Islamist organization Özgür-Der.

United Kingdom

- On May 6, hundreds of British Muslims and Muslims Against Crusades members held a pro-Bin Laden rally outside the U.S. Embassy, London and staged salat al-Janazah (funeral prayers) for Osama bin Laden. Protesters clashed with police when they tried to storm the embassy. Anjem Choudary – a British national of Pakistani descent, who organised the protest, predicted an attack similar to the 7 July 2005 London bombings in response to bin Laden's death. The rally was met by a counter protest from the anti-Islamist English Defence League.

India

- May 6, Separatist Hurriyat Conference leader Syed Ali Shah Geelani led a gathering for funeral prayers at Batmaloo, Srinagar for al-Qaeda chief Osama bin Laden. Special prayers were given at Pulwama, Bijbehara and Baramulla in Kashmir. These prayers were attended by about a hundred Kashmiri Muslims who called Osama a martyr. Protesters also shouted anti-U.S. slogans. Although a relatively minor incident, it led to a small riot between police and protesters.

Egypt

- Hundreds of Islamist Salafists held special prayers Friday for Osama bin Laden at the Salafist-run al-Nour Mosque in the Abbasiyah quarter of Cairo after regular Friday noon prayers, though police tried to stop the special prayers. Some Islamists regard bin Laden as a martyr.

== See also ==
- Death of Osama bin Laden conspiracy theories
- Operation Geronimo name controversy
- Reactions to the September 11 attacks
- The Situation Room (photograph)
