= Peshawar Press Club =

The Peshawar Press Club (PPC; Urdu: پشاور پریس کلب) is an organisation of journalists and professionals working in media in Peshawar, Pakistan. The press club was founded in 1964 after the need for journalists to sit and organise press conferences was raised. Currently, the PPC has a membership of 550 working journalists affiliated with over 55 media outlets from both print and electronic media, making it the third-largest in the country. The press club is led by a five-member cabinet consisting of a President, Vice-President, General Secretary, Joint Secretary and Treasurer; these positions are currently occupied by Arshad Aziz Malik, Rizwan Sheikh, Irfan Musazai, Tayyeb Usman and Amaad Waheed respectively.

In December 2009, the Peshawar Press Club was the target of a suicide bombing which killed three people. According to authorities, "the bomber wanted to get into the Press club" and when the police guard stopped him, he blew himself up. The force of the explosion shattered the windows in the red brick press club building, damaging the guard hut outside and nearby vehicles.

== See also ==
- Karachi Press Club
- Lahore Press Club
- Quetta Press Club
