= Chitral Press Club =

Pakistani representative body of journalists

- چترال پریس کلب
- Headquarters: Chitral, Khyber Pakhtunkhwa, Pakistan
- Location: Pakistan
- Coordinates: 35.8531091439205°N 71.78949961763732°E
- President: Zahiruddin
- Senior Vice President: Saifur Rahman Aziz

The Chitral Press Club of Chitral District, Khyber Pakhtunkhwa, Pakistan, is the representative body of journalists based in Chitral and Upper Chitral.

It has an elected governing body represented by the following people:

- Zahiruddin of Daily Dawn (President)
- Saifur Rehman Aziz of Samaa TV (Senior Vice President)
- Mian Asif Ali Shah Kakakhel of PTV (Vice President)
- Abdul Ghafar of Daily Jihad (General Secretary),
- Syed Nazir Hussain Shah of Mashriq TV (Finance Secretary)
