= Karachi Press Club =

Pakistani journalistic association

Karachi Press Club کراچی پریس کلب
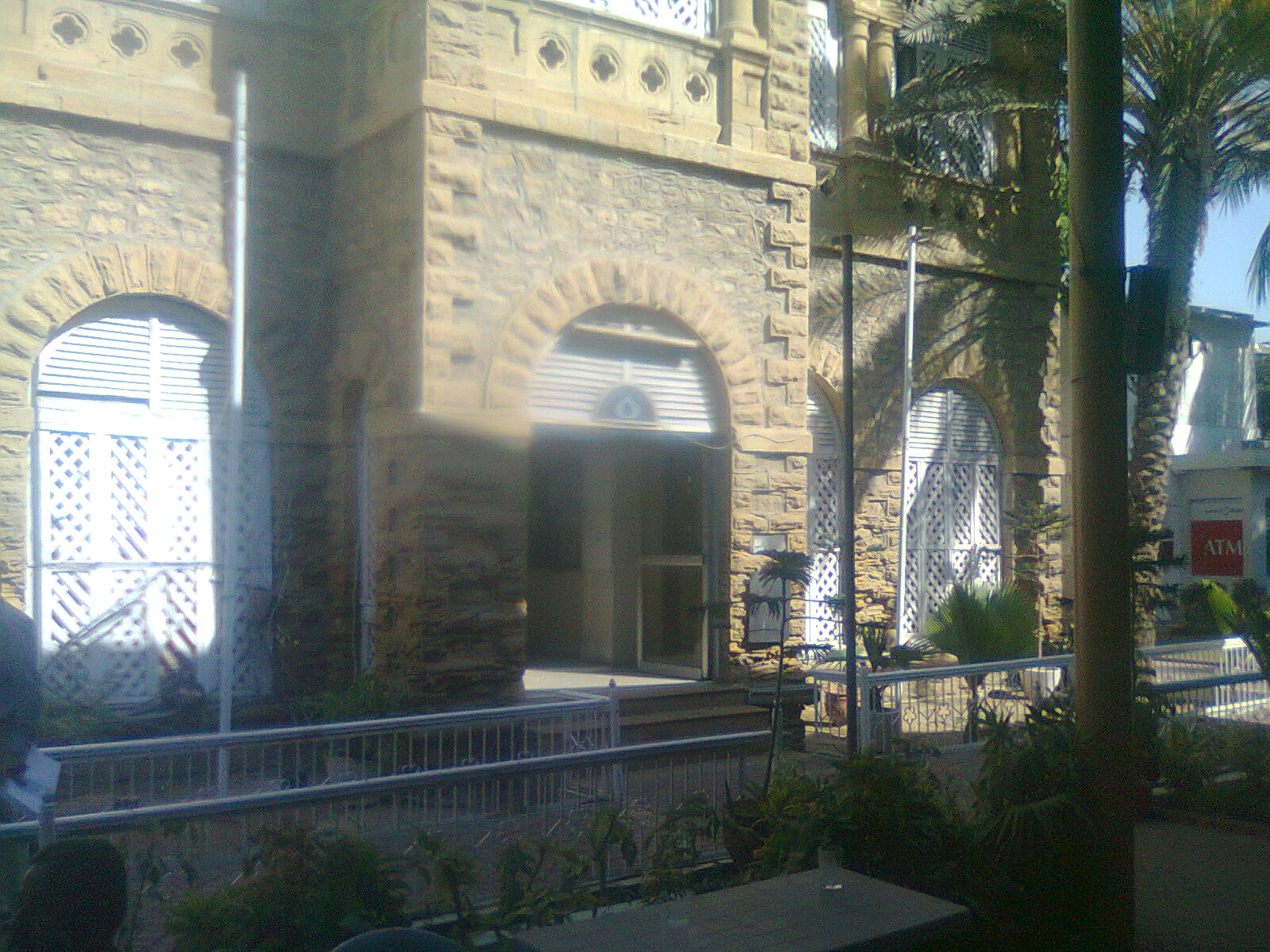
- Karachi Press Club's main Building
- Karachi, Sindh, Pakistan

Information
- Website: Official website

The Karachi Press Club (KPC @pressclubkhi) (Urdu: کراچی پریس کلب) is an organization of the community of the journalists. It also takes account of academics, business people and people from the public service. Karachi Press Club was the first press club that was established and located at Karachi, Sindh, Pakistan.

== History ==
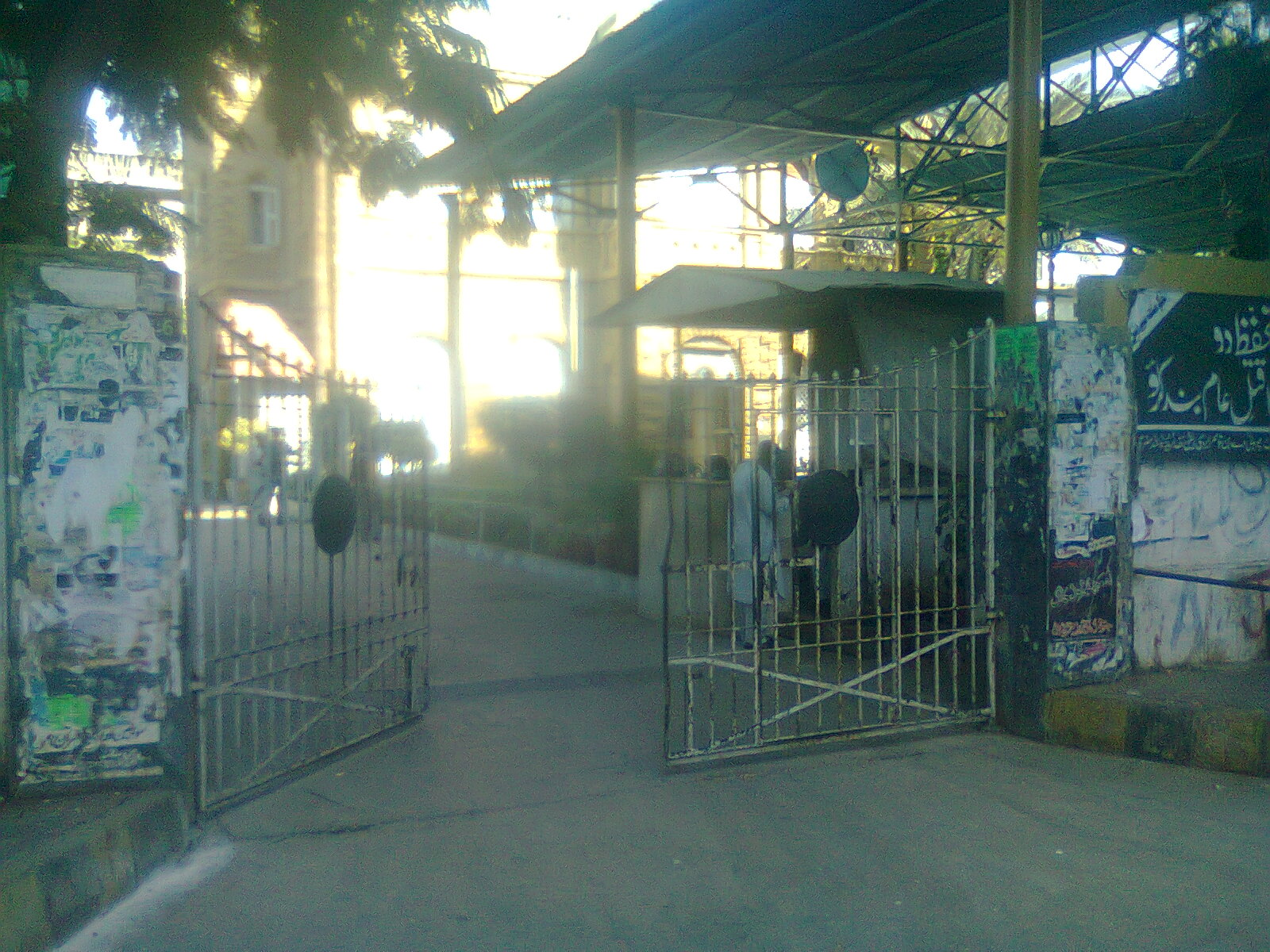
Karachi Press Club's main entrance

Karachi Press Club was the first press club that was established in Karachi, Pakistan. Its first election was held in 1958, and I. H. Burne was elected its first president. The Club which consists of Governing Body, and its bearers president, secretary and council members manage the affairs of club.

Karachi Press Club is the place where regularly demonstrations, rallies and protests are organised against the government and for the demand of the civil and human rights by people and organizations.

The Club has also participated in efforts to promote people-to-people contact and durable and continuing peace in South Asia.

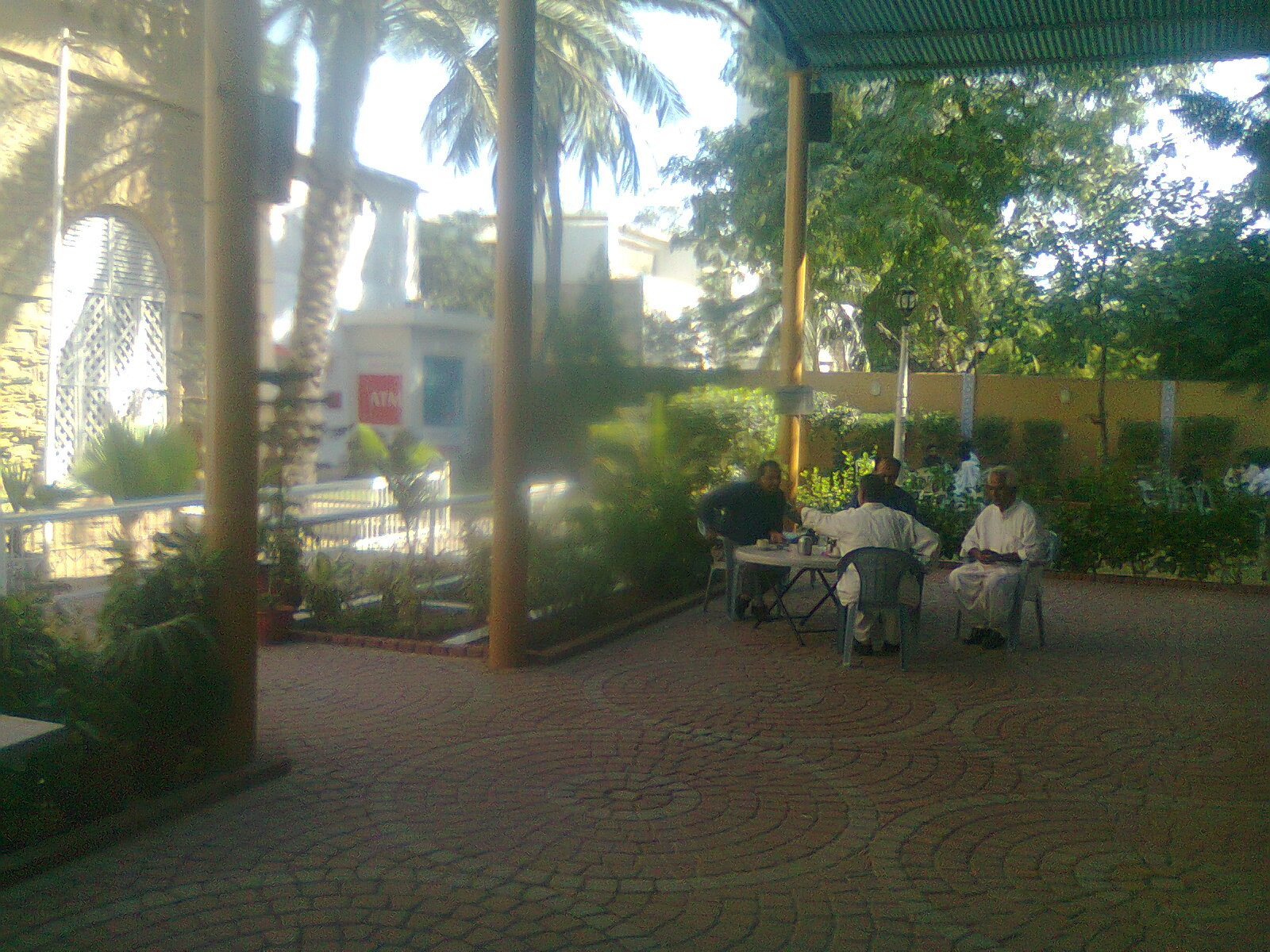
Karachi Press Club's lawn

On 27 March 2016, the Karachi Press Club was attacked by protesters carrying pictures of Mumtaz Qadri, the murderer of Salman Taseer. On the same day a massive crowd marched from Rawalpindi to Islamabad to protest his execution and the Karachi attackers retaliated for "lack of coverage of their event."

In 2011, the website of Karachi Press Club was hacked, which police attributed to hackers based in India.

On 8 November 2018, armed plainclothes security forces entered the club against its rules and made photos and videos inside, and a journalist was later arrested at his home and charged with possession of Islamic State materials.

The club has the only bar in Pakistan, and its dining hall does not close during the Ramadan fast. An exterior wall of the Club features a mural painted by artist Haider Ali that portrays notable Pakistani women including Yasmeen Lari, Pakistan's first female architect and Sabeen Mahmud, a prominent activist. A target of vandalism and graffiti, in 2017 Ali restored the murals. The subject of local protests while it was painted, the work was commissioned as part of the I am Karachi campaign.

In July 2020, Sindh Rangers entered KPC without permission and then conducted security drills there. Shehzada Zulfiqar and Nasir Zaidi, president and secretary general of the Pakistan Federal Union of Journalists, said the action was designed to terrify the journalist community, demanded an apology as well as a legal probe into the incident. The official twitter account of the Karachi Press Club is @pressclubkhi

== See also ==
- Lahore Press Club
