= Narayanganj Online Press Club =

- নারায়ণগঞ্জ অনলাইন প্রেস ক্লাব
- Formation: 2017
- Headquarters: Narayanganj, Bangladesh
- Region served: Narayanganj Bangladesh
- Official language: Bengali

Narayanganj Online Press Club (Bengali: নারায়ণগঞ্জ অনলাইন প্রেস ক্লাব) is a popular place for the local and national print & online-based media journalists of Narayanganj, Bangladesh.

== History ==
Narayanganj Online Press Club was established in 2017 with the aim of development and welfare of journalists.

The club celebrated a grand opening ceremony program 2023 on the occasion of entering the sixth year. On the occasion, the convening committee and 31 ordinary members were announced to run the club.

== Extra Link ==
Narayanganj Press Club

== See also ==
Jatiya Press Club
