= Nasir Zaidi =

Personal information
- Full name: Syed Mohammad Nasir Zaidi
- Born: 25 March 1961 (age 65); Karachi, Pakistan
- Batting: Right-handed
- Bowling: Leg-break

Domestic team information
- Years: Team
- 1980/81: Karachi
- 1983–1984: Lancashire
- FC debut: 23 April 1983 Lancashire v Oxford University
- Last FC: 13 June 1984 Lancashire v Somerset
- Only LA: 17 March 1981 Karachi v National Bank of Pakistan

Career statistics
Competition	First-class	List A
Matches	19	1
Runs scored	313	–
Batting average	24.07	–
100s/50s	0/1	–
Top score	51	–
Balls bowled	1,629	18
Wickets	19	0
Bowling average	43.52	–
5 wickets in innings	0	–
10 wickets in match	0	–
Best bowling	3/27	–
Catches/stumpings	15/–	0/–
- Source: ESPNcricinfo, 24 April 2014

Syed Mohammad Nasir Zaidi (born 25 March 1961) is a former cricketer for Karachi and Lancashire. Born in Karachi, Pakistan, Nasir was a right-hand batsman and leg break bowler. He played for Karachi in the 1980–81 season, though he made only one one day appearance. He then elected to move to England, where he trialed for the Second XI of Glamorgan, and Middlesex before Lancashire Second XI in 1983. He appeared for the Lancashire First XI from 1983 until 1985, playing 19 matches, scoring 313 runs and taking 19 wickets. After Lancashire he played Minor County cricket for Norfolk until 1986.
