= Quetta Press Club =

The Quetta Press Club is a press club in Quetta, Pakistan.

== See also ==
- Karachi Press Club
- Lahore Press Club
- Peshawar Press Club
