= San Diego Press Club =

Journalism group in San Diego, California

- Formation: 1973
- Founders: Andrew C. "Andy" Mace; Jack Gregg
- Headquarters: San Diego
- President: Stephen Fiorina; Retired San Diego TV journalist
- Executive Director: Albert H. Fulcher
- Website: sdpressclub.org

The San Diego Press Club is a 501(c)(3) organization for journalists and communications professionals in San Diego County, California, and has a membership of about 400. Its annual Excellence in Journalism Awards competition, which the club describes as among the largest in the country, honors work by San Diego County media and communications professionals.

== History ==
The club traces its roots to press organizations active in San Diego in the 1890s. Its published history begins with the San Diego Woman's Press Club, which it describes as well established by the end of that decade and as later holding office space near the Prado in Balboa Park following the Panama-California Exposition. In 1936, an organization under the name San Diego Press Club published History of San Diego County, edited by Carl H. Heilbron. The two-volume narrative and biographical history of the county ran to nearly 800 pages.

Andy Mace, a public relations manager at Pacific Telephone in San Diego, is credited with proposing the current organization in 1971. He later founded his own firm and died in 2009 at the age of 88. The club's public relations career award carries his name. The present San Diego Press Club was founded in 1973.

Terry Williams served as the club's executive director for twenty years until her retirement in 2023. A member since 2008 and club president in 2019 and 2020, Albert Fulcher was named executive director in 2025.

== Excellence in Journalism Awards ==
The club's annual Excellence in Journalism Awards program gives more than 500 awards in roughly 130 categories and ten divisions, covering print, online and broadcast journalism, photography, public relations and college media. Entries are judged by members of journalism organizations elsewhere in the country, including press clubs in San Francisco, Los Angeles, New Orleans, Cleveland, Milwaukee and Alaska. The program is open to the public and draws about 1,100 entries a year.

Three career awards are presented alongside the competition: the Harold Keen Award for contributions in journalism; the Andy Mace Award for career achievement in public relations; and the Jim Reiman Award for excellence in media management. The club's charitable foundation funds scholarships annully to journalism students at local colleges.

The Club held its 52nd annual awards program on October 28, 2025, at the Encore Event Center in San Diego.
