= Lahore Press Club =

Pakistani journalistic association

The Lahore Press Club (Urdu: لاہور پریس کلب) is an association of primarily news journalists, and also includes academics, business people and members of the public service sector in Lahore, Pakistan. It is the biggest press club in the country, with a membership of 3250, and is well known for its gatherings with invited speakers from public life. Veteran journalist Raja Aurangzeb played a major role in convincing Punjab former chief minister late Ghulam Haider Wyne to allot land for the Lahore Press Club at Shimla Pahari. Arshad Ansari is the only journalist in Pakistan who got elected 11 times as the president of Lahore Press Club.

In 2015, the chief minister of Punjab Shahbaz Sharif expressed his views about the role of journalists in society while addressing the oath-taking ceremony of the newly elected governing body of the Lahore Press Club. He said, "...the role of the journalist community was of vital importance for promoting harmony and tolerance in society for eliminating terrorism."

It is also a convenient place for bringing up current issues for discussion facing journalism and news media in Pakistan. This sometimes leads to public protests in front of the Lahore Press Club building as is evident in this news item in a major newspaper.

Elections for the Lahore Press Club office-holders were held at Lahore's Alhamra Arts Council in 2014. Ali Zafar, was awarded a lifetime membership in the club in 2014.
