= Glen S. Fukushima =

American businessman (born 1949)

Glen Fukushima
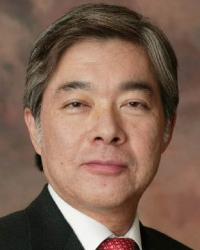
- Fukushima in 2022
- Born: September 9, 1949 (age 77); California, United States
- Education: Deep Springs College; Stanford University (BA); Keio University; Harvard University (MA, JD); University of Tokyo (Fulbright)
- Occupations: Senior Fellow, Center for American Progress; Vice Chair, Securities Investor Protection Corporation
- Spouse: Sakie Fukushima

Glen Shigeru Fukushima (born 9 September 1949) is an American academic, businessman, and philanthropist. He is currently a senior fellow at the Center for American Progress in Washington, D.C. and, in April 2022, was confirmed by the U.S. Senate to serve as vice chairman of the Securities Investor Protection Corporation following his appointment by President Joe Biden.

Fukushima was widely suggested as a potential U.S. Ambassador to Japan in 2020 due to his extensive experience in U.S.-Japan relations.

In 2022, Fukushima made the largest single private donation in history to the Fulbright Program in Japan, establishing the Fulbright-Glen S. Fukushima Fund to expand study and research opportunities for Japanese and Americans. In 2023, he donated $3 million to Deep Springs College. In 2025, he donated $10,000 to the Asia-Pacific Journal: Japan Focus, with another $20,000 as a matching fund.

== Early life and education ==
Fukushima is a native of California and a Sansei. He was raised as an Army brat in California and Japan living on U.S. military bases including Camp Sendai, Washington Heights, and Camp Zama. He attended elementary school in the northern California city of Monterey and in San Francisco. He attended Zama American High School in Japan and Gardena High School in Southern California.

Fukushima's undergraduate education started at Deep Springs College and he completed a degree in economics at Stanford University. He completed an exchange year at Keio University in Tokyo during the 1971–1972 school year. He is fluent in English and Japanese.

After college, Fukushima worked in Tokyo from 1972 to 1974 working for The Asahi Shimbun and the Law Firm of Hamada and Yanagida. He also studied diplomatic history at the University of Tokyo while living in Japan.

Fukushima returned to the United States in 1974 and studied at Harvard University from 1974 to 1982. While at Harvard, he earned a MA in Regional Studies—East Asia and completed all coursework necessary for a PhD in Sociology except his dissertation on comparative U.S.-Japan antitrust law and policy. He also attended the MBA program at the Harvard Business School was awarded a JD degree from Harvard Law School.

While at Harvard, Fukushima worked as a teaching assistant to prominent sociologist David Riesman along with influential Japanologists Ezra Vogel and Edwin Reischauer. He was a contemporary of Francis Fukuyama.

Among Fukushima's academic distinctions at Harvard was a National Science Foundation fellowship. Upon completing his studies at Harvard, he conducted research at the Faculty of Law at the University of Tokyo as a Fulbright Fellow and Japan Foundation Fellow.

== Career ==
Fukushima began his career as an attorney at the law firm of Paul, Hastings, Janofsky & Walker (now Paul Hastings) in Los Angeles from 1982 to 1985.

=== Office of the United States Trade Representative ===
Fukushima served as Deputy Assistant United States Trade Representative for Japan and China from 1988 to 1990. Prior to that, he served as Director for Japanese Affairs (1985–1988) at the Office of the United States Trade Representative (USTR). During his time at USTR, Fukushima gained a reputation as one of the most effective American trade negotiators with Japan and was instrumental in opening up markets for a variety of American industries.

He was largely responsible for the success in opening Japanese markets to US products and services during that period. Based on his experience at USTR, he wrote a memo (Repairing the U.S.-Japan Relationship, January 4, 1994) that ended up on the desk of U.S. President Bill Clinton. Clinton added favorable annotations and circulated it widely to his cabinet and senior trade and economic officials during negotiations taking place under the US-Japan Framework Talks.

=== Private sector work in Asia ===
After leaving the USTR in 1990, Fukushima was a senior business executive based in Asia until 2012. He entered the corporate world at AT&T. In 1990, he was assigned to work in Tokyo as Vice President of AT&T Japan, where he headed public policy and business development.

In January 1993, he was offered the position of U.S. Assistant Secretary of Commerce for International Economic Policy, but declined to continue his private-sector career. The person who later assumed the position, Charles Meissner, died with Secretary of Commerce Ron Brown and others in the 1996 Croatia USAF CT-43 crash.

He served as president and CEO of Arthur D. Little Japan from 1998 to 2000, President & CEO of Cadence Design Systems Japan from 2000 to 2004, and co-president of NCR Japan from 2004 to 2005. In 2005, he became President & CEO of Airbus Japan, a position he held until 2010 when he became chairman and director, serving until 2012.

==== Corporate boards ====
While working in the private sector in Japan, Fukushima served on a number of notable corporate boards. In 2001, he became the first American to serve on the board of directors of Mizuho Financial Group, then the largest banking group in Japan. Prior to Mizuho, he represented Cadence Design Systems on the board of directors of Innotech Corporation which it owned an interest in. He also served on the boards or advisory boards of such of companies such as the Industrial Bank of Japan, Daiwa Securities Group, Nissho Iwai, and Fidelity International.

==== American Chamber of Commerce in Japan ====
Fukushima served as vice president of the American Chamber of Commerce in Japan from 1993 to 1997 before being elected to serve as its president for two consecutive terms. At the conclusion of his term, The Japan Times noted his contributions raising the role and visibility of the Chamber in the Japanese business, government, and political world, including being the first president of the ACCJ in its 50-year history to be invited to address the Japan National Press Club.

=== Center for American Progress ===
Since September 2012, Fukushima has been based in Washington, DC as a senior fellow at the Center for American Progress (CAP), a public policy think tank. His work has focused on U.S. foreign economic policy, international political economy, and U.S.-Asia relations, especially Northeast Asia (China, Japan, Korea).

=== Securities Investor Protection Corporation ===
In October 2022, President Joe Biden nominated Fukushima to the board of the Securities Investor Protection Corporation (SIPC). Upon receiving Senate confirmation in April 2022, Fukushima was appointed by the President to serve as vice chairman of the board. The SIPC was established by Congress in 1970 to assist investors in the case of the failure of a brokerage firm. It is led by a board comprising seven members, five appointed by the President and confirmed by the Senate, and two named by the U.S. Treasury and the Federal Reserve, each serving a term of three years.

== Think tanks and philanthropy ==
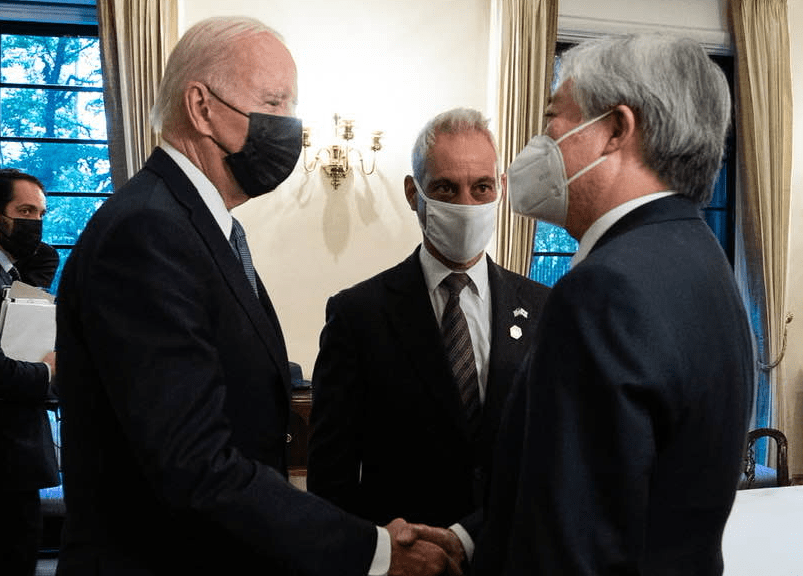
President Joe Biden and U.S. Ambassador to Japan Rahm Emanuel thank Fukushima for his $1 million donation to the Fulbright Program Japan at the U.S. Embassy Tokyo

Fukushima is a significant donor to a number of non-profit organizations and has served on a number of nonprofit boards and government advisory councils in the United States, Japan, and Europe.

He has been a member of the Council on Foreign Relations since 1993. He is also a member of the Tokyo Club and Tokyo Rotary Club.

=== Government ===
During the Clinton Administration, the White House appointed him vice chair of the Japan-U.S. Friendship Commission and the U.S. panel of Joint Committee on U.S.-Japan Cultural and Educational Interchange (CULCON).

Prior to the Clinton Administration, he was invited by president elect Bill Clinton to speak at the Little Rock Economic Summit on "Challenges and Opportunities for the United States in the Asia-Pacific Region."

Fukushima was a member of Hillary Clinton's Asia Policy Working Group during the 2016 presidential campaign. He is a cofounder of the Coalition of Asian Pacific Americans for the 21st Century (CAPA21), a political action committee, to which he donated $500,000 at its founding, and has served on the national committee of Latino Victory.

=== Nonprofit boards ===
Fukushima has served on the board of numerous nonprofits in the United States and in Japan. These include the Japan Association of Corporate Executives and the America-Japan Society. He has been a member of the Global Council of the Asia Society, President's Leadership Council of the Asia Foundation, the board of trustees of the Japanese American National Museum, the board of directors of the U.S.-Japan Council, the board of advisors of the Japan Policy Research Institute, and the board of directors of the Japan Society of Boston, the Japan Society of Northern California, the Japan Society of Washington, D.C., and the National Association of Japan-America Societies.

Fukushima has had a lifelong interest in education and has served on advisory boards at Stanford University (Asia-Pacific Research Center), Occidental College, and the University of California at San Diego. More recently, he has served on several advisory boards at Harvard University: Asia Center, Law School, Program on U.S.-Japan Relations, and Program on Regional Studies–East Asia. In Japan, he has served as an advisor, board member, or on the faculty of Keio University, Waseda University, Rikkyo University, Tsukuba University, International Christian University, Kyoto University, and the University of Tokyo.

=== Philanthropy ===
Fukushima and his wife Sakie are philanthropists who regularly donate large amounts to support charities working to create educational opportunities. Fukushima is also a patron of the arts as a major contributor to the San Francisco Museum of Modern Art and the Asian Art Museum in San Francisco.

In 2022, Fukushima donated $1 million to the U.S.-Japan Fulbright exchange program, the largest donation ever made by an individual. The donation was announced at the U.S. Embassy Tokyo with President Joe Biden and Ambassador Rahm Emanuel present and established the Fulbright-Glen S. Fukushima Fund to expand study and research opportunities for Japanese and Americans.

In 2023, he donated $3 million to endow the "Glen S. and Sakie T. Fukushima Fund at Deep Springs College which aims to bring world-class faculty to the college. The donation was described as a "game changer for the academic pillar at Deep Springs" by Jefferson Cowie.

In 2024, he donated $100,000 to the Inter-University Center for Japanese Language Studies administered by Stanford University and $100,000 to the Master's Program in Regional Studies — East Asia at Harvard University. He and his wife also donated $1 million to the Japan America Student Conference on its 90th anniversary in August 2024 to create the Glen S. & Sakie T. Fukushima JASC Alumni Fellowship Fund.

== Publications ==
=== Books ===
- 日米経済摩擦の政治学 (The Politics of U.S.-Japan Trade Friction), 1992 — winner of the 9th Masayoshi Ohira Memorial Foundation Prize in 1993.
- 変わるアメリカ変わるか日本 (A New Era in U.S.-Japan Relations?), 1993
- 2001年、日本は必ずよみがえる (How the Japanese Economy Can Revive by the Year 2001), 1999

=== Selected publications ===
- Will there be a Pacific trade war in 2018?, Nikkei Asia, 2018
- Bilateralism takes the lead after the Osaka G20 summit, East Asia Forum, 2019
- A View from Japan, The Asan Forum, 2019
- The G20's uncertain future, East Asia Forum, 2020
- The Case of Shinzo Abe, The Asan Forum, 2020
- The United States and Japan agree in principle, but implementation is key, East Asia Forum, 2021
- Japan: Biden's Big Challenge, Democracy, 2021
- Japanese Capitalism and Its Lessons for the United States, Council on Foreign Relations, 2022
- What I Learned from the Fulbright Fellowship, Japan Up Close 2022
- Why I Contributed $1 Million to Fulbright Japan, Fulbright Chronicles, 2022
- 元米通商代表補代理フクシマ氏「米、自由貿易回帰に時間」, The Nikkei, 2022
- The geopolitics and economics of technology in the indo-pacific : security, prosperity and values, European University Institute, 2023

=== Selected interviews ===
- Japanese Americans & Japan: Legacies – Interview with Glen S. Fukushima, U.S.-Japan Council, 2021
- Former USTR official: US will need more time for trade liberalization, Nikkei Asia, 2022
- 波乱必至！アメリカ大統領選挙 第3のシナリオは？, BS11 News, Nippon BS Broadcasting, 2023
- Glen S. Fukushima: Crossing divides, building bridges, Sustainable Japan by The Japan Times, 2023

=== Selected presentations ===
- America's Asia Policy, a Conversation with Glen S. Fukushima, United Nations University, 2014
- The 2020 U.S. Presidential Election and Japan, Foreign Correspondents' Club of Japan, 2020
- バイデン政権の課題と日米関係, Japan National Press Club, 2022
- 2024 米大統領選, Japan National Press Club, 2024

== Partial list of awards ==
- Masayoshi Ohira Memorial Prize for Nichi-Bei Keizai Masatsu no Seijigaku, Masayoshi Ohira Memorial Foundation, 1993
- Excellence 2000 Award, U.S. Pan Asia American Chamber of Commerce, 1999
- Alumni Hall of Fame, Stanford University, 2002
- Person of the Year, National Japanese American Historical Society, 2008
- Honorary Alumnus, Keio University, 2012
- Distinguished Achievement Award, Keizai Silicon Valley US–Japan Business Forum, 2024
