= U.S.-Japan Council =

Educational nonprofit that contributes to strengthening U.S.-Japan Relations

- Founded: 2009
- Type: Non-profit organization
- Purpose: Japan–United States relations, Education
- Key people: Audrey Yamamoto, President & CEO
- Website: usjapancouncil.org

The U.S.-Japan Council (Japanese: 米日カウンシル, Beinichi Kaunshiru, USJC) is a 501(c) 3 non-profit organization that contributes to strengthening U.S.-Japan relations by bringing together leaders and exploring issues that affect communities, businesses and government entities in both countries. It is a Japanese American-led organization.

== History ==
USJC was founded in 2009 by Japanese Americans who "saw a need for a conscious effort to ensure a strong relationship with Japan." Central to such an effort was Irene Hirano Inouye, then president and CEO of the Japanese American National Museum, who had been working with the Ministry of Foreign Affairs to introduce Japanese American leaders to Japan through the Japanese American Leadership Delegation.

In 2012, the U.S.-Japan Council (Japan) was created to support the administration of the TOMODACHI Initiative. In 2013, U.S.-Japan Council (Japan) became a Public Interest Corporation (Koeki Zaidan Hojin).

President Barack Obama and Prime Minister Shinzō Abe praised the work of the U.S.-Japan Council in supporting the U.S.-Japan relationship in a Joint Statement issued during their April 2014 Summit. The Joint Statement particularly highlighted the importance of the Japan American Leadership Delegation and the TOMODACHI Initiative, two of the U.S.-Japan Council's signature programs.

In May 2020, Suzanne Basalla succeeded the late Hirano Inouye as President and CEO of the Council. In 2024, Audrey Yamamoto succeeded Suzanne Basalla as President and CEO of the Council.

== Organization ==
USJC cultivates an international network of Japanese American leaders known as Council Members, and collaborates with other organizations and institutions to develop programs that allow Council Members to engage with their Japanese counterparts and leaders in the United States.

== Programs ==
USJC has several programs, including the USJC Annual Conference, the Japanese American Leadership Delegation program, the Consuls General & Japanese American Leaders Meeting, the Emerging Leaders Program, and Legislative and Business Networking Initiatives.

== The Tomodachi Initiative ==
The Tomodachi Initiative is a public–private partnership between the U.S.-Japan Council and the U.S. Embassy in Tokyo, with support from the Government of Japan. Born out of support for Japan’s recovery from the Great Tohoku earthquake and tsunami in 2011, Tomodachi invests in the next generation of Japanese and American leaders through educational and cultural exchanges as well as leadership programs.

In the aftermath of the Great Tohoku earthquake, USJC created the U.S.-Japan Council Earthquake Relief Fund, which supported the relief and recovery efforts of several NPOs and NGOs in Japan. Ambassador John V. Roos, who was serving in Japan at the time, approached USJC to work with the embassy to implement a public-private partnership. This then became the Tomodachi Initiative.

== List of people associated with USJC ==
- Naoyuki Agawa
- George Aratani
- George Ariyoshi
- Howard Baker
- Gerald Curtis
- Thomas Foley
- Ichiro Fujisaki
- Soichiro Fukutake
- Glen Fukushima
- Ryu Goto
- Colleen Hanabusa
- Ernest Higa
- Mazie Hirono
- Irene Hirano Inouye
- Daniel K. Inouye
- Ryozo Kato
- Fred Katayama
- Takashi Kawamura
- Yohei Kono
- Hiroko Kuniya
- Doris Matsui
- Norman Mineta
- Walter Mondale
- Daniel Okimoto
- Motoatsu Sakurai
- Thomas Schieffer
- George Takei
- Paul Terasaki
- Kristi Yamaguchi
- Roy Yamaguchi
- Jan Yanehiro

== See also ==
- Japanese American Citizens League
- Japanese American National Museum
- Japanese American National Library
- Japanese Cultural Center of Hawaii
- Densho: The Japanese American Legacy Project
- Japanese American Committee for Democracy
