= USS Daniel Inouye =

American Navy warship

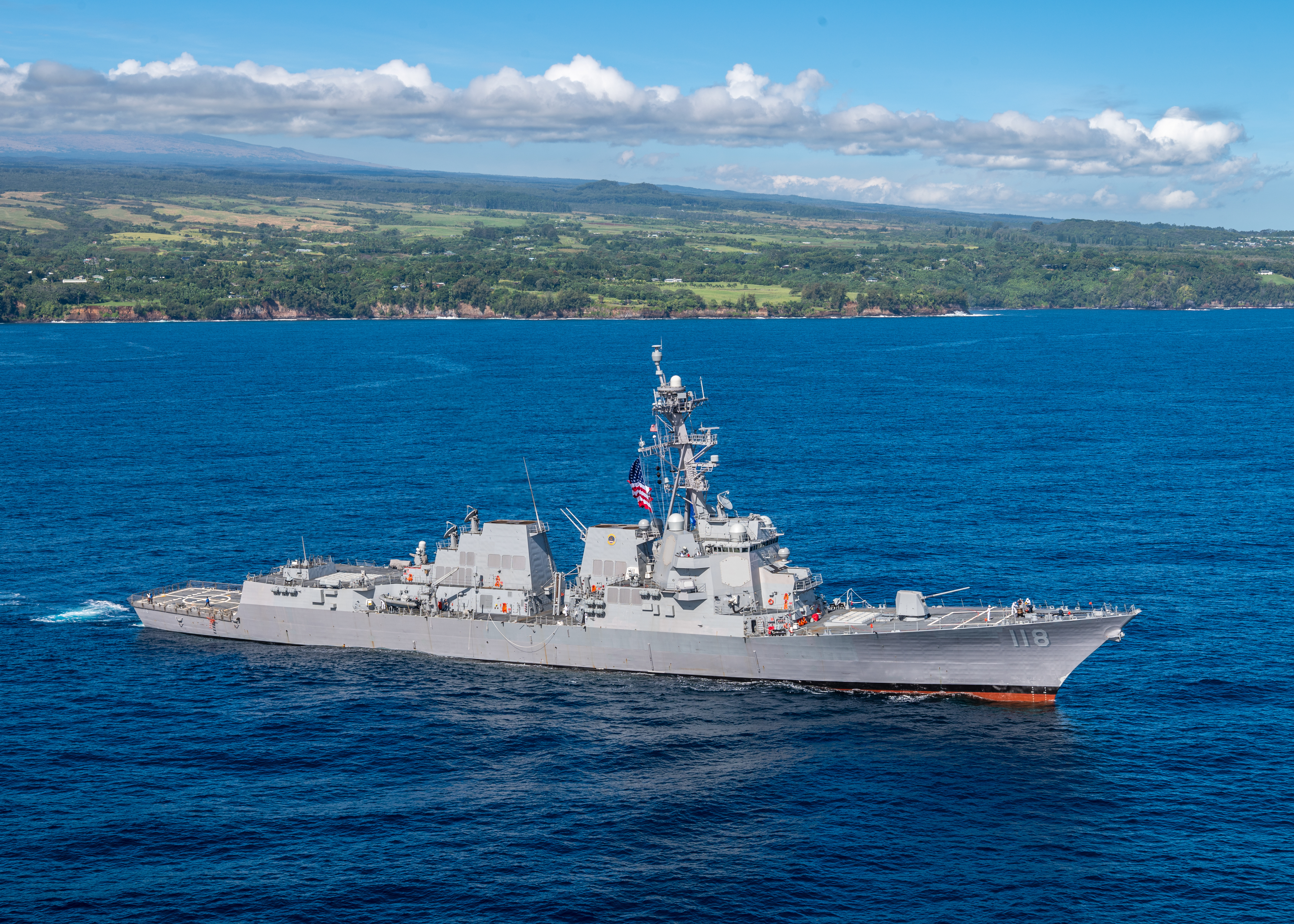
- USS Daniel Inouye

History

United States
- Name: Daniel Inouye
- Namesake: Daniel Inouye
- Builder: Bath Iron Works
- Laid down: 14 May 2018
- Launched: 27 October 2019
- Sponsored by: Irene Hirano Inouye
- Christened: 22 June 2019
- Acquired: 8 March 2021
- Commissioned: 8 December 2021
- Home port: Pearl Harbor
- Identification: MMSI number: 368926540; Callsign: NINO; Pennant number: DDG-118
- Motto: Go for Broke
- Status: In active service
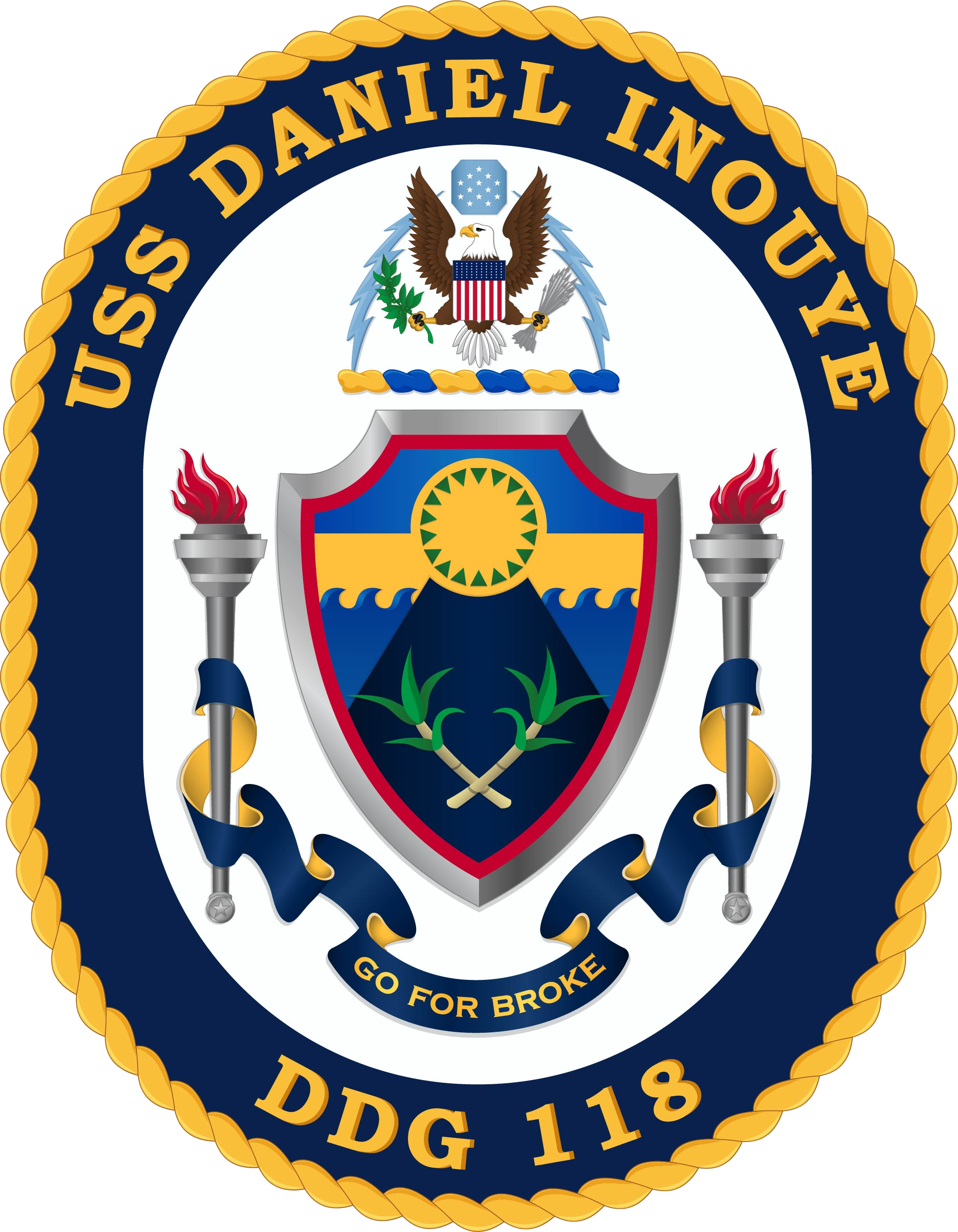
- Badge

General characteristics
- Class & type: Arleigh Burke-class destroyer
- Displacement: 9,200 long tons (9,300 t)
- Length: 513 ft (156 m)
- Draft: 31 ft (9.4 m)
- Propulsion: 4 × General Electric LM2500 gas turbines 100,000 shp (75,000 kW)
- Speed: 31 knots (57 km/h; 36 mph)
- Complement: 23 officers, 300 enlisted
- Armament: Guns: 1 × 5-inch (127 mm)/62 Mk 45 Mod 4 (lightweight gun); 1 × 20 mm (0.8 in) Phalanx CIWS; 2 × 25 mm (0.98 in) Mk 38 machine gun system; 4 × 0.50 in (12.7 mm) caliber guns; Missiles: 1 × 32-cell, 1 × 64-cell (96 total cells) Mk 41 vertical launching system (VLS): RIM-66M surface-to-air missile; RIM-156 surface-to-air missile; RIM-174A Standard ERAM; RIM-161 anti-ballistic missile; RIM-162 ESSM (quad-packed); BGM-109 Tomahawk cruise missile; RUM-139 vertical launch ASROC; Torpedoes: 2 × Mark 32 triple torpedo tubes: Mark 46 lightweight torpedo; Mark 50 lightweight torpedo; Mark 54 lightweight torpedo
- Aircraft carried: 2 × MH-60R Seahawk helicopters
- Aviation facilities: Double hangar and helipad

USS Daniel Inouye (DDG-118) is an Arleigh Burke-class (Flight IIA Technology Insertion) Aegis guided missile destroyer in the United States Navy. She is named to honor former United States Senator Daniel Inouye of Hawaii. Inouye was awarded the Medal of Honor for his actions in Tuscany, Italy, during World War II. She is part of Destroyer Squadron 31 of Naval Surface Group Middle Pacific.

== Construction and commissioning ==
Daniel Inouye is the third of eight planned Flight IIA "technology insertion" ships, which contains elements of the Flight III ships projected to begin with DDG-125.

Daniel Inouye's keel was laid on 14 May 2018 and christened by Inouye's widow, Irene Hirano Inouye, on 22 June 2019. General Dynamics Bath Iron Works delivered the ship to the U.S. Navy on 8 March 2021. She was commissioned on 8 December 2021 in a ceremony at her homeport, Joint Base Pearl Harbor–Hickam. Maggie Inouye, with presence of Jessica Inouye and Jennifer Sabas, giving the order to "man our ship and bring her to life" in the place of Irene Hirano Inouye, who died in 2020.
