= Sakie =

- Gender: Female

Origin
- Origin: Japanese
- Meaning: Different meanings depending on the kanji used

Sakie (written: 咲江) is a feminine Japanese given name. Notable people with the name include:

- Sakie Tsukuda (佃 咲江; born 1985), Japanese cyclist
- Sakie Nobuoka (信岡 沙希重; born 1977), Japanese former sprinter
- Sakie Yokota (born 1936), Japanese human rights activist
- Sakie T. Fukushima, Japanese business executive
