= Fred Katayama =

Japanese American television journalist (born 1960)

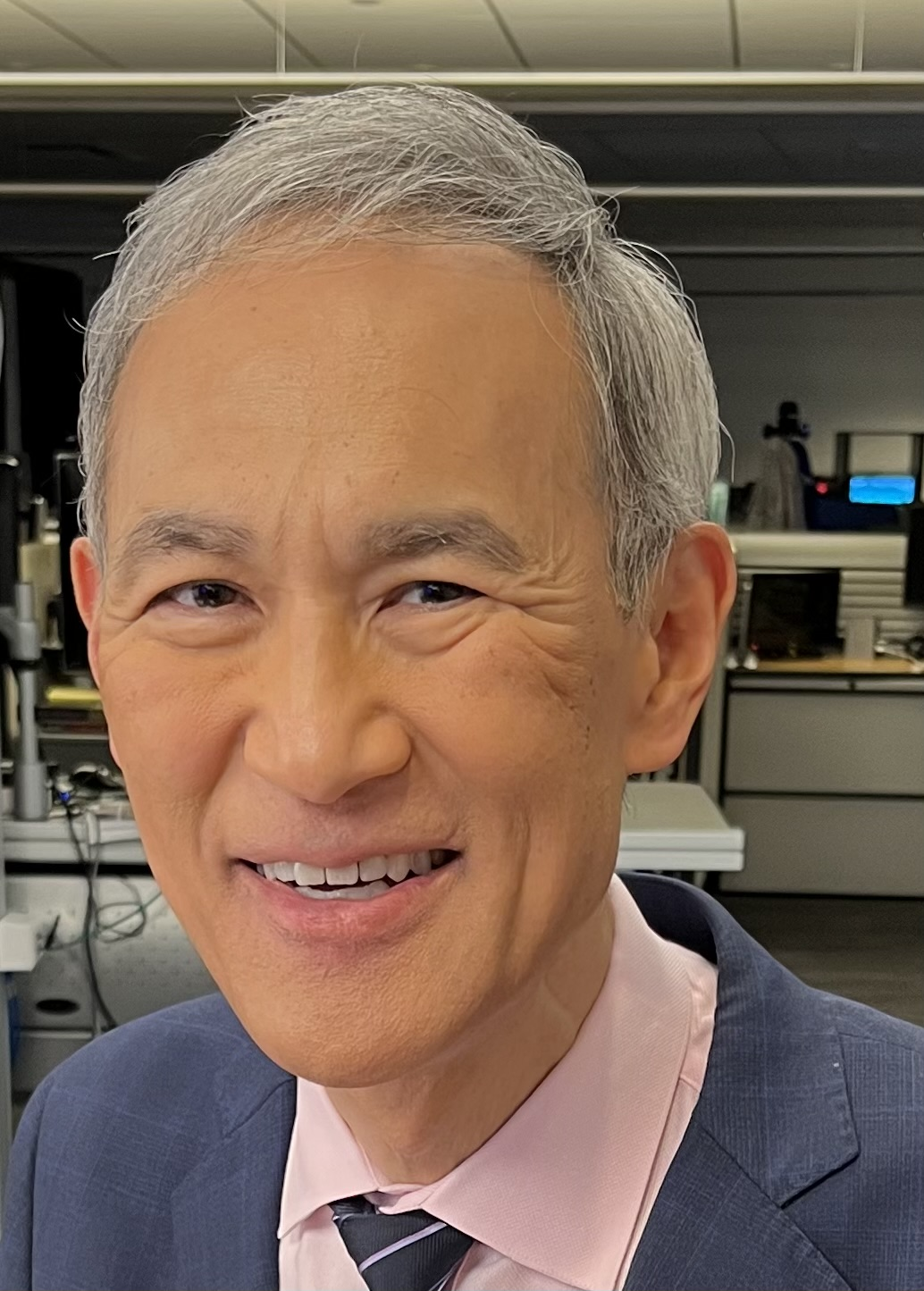
- Born: February 18, 1960 (age 66); Los Angeles, California, U.S.
- Education: Maryknoll School; Loyola High School; Columbia College (B.A.); Columbia University Graduate School of Journalism (M.S.)
- Occupation: Journalist
- Employers: Associated Press (1984-1985); Fortune Magazine (1985-1990); NHK (1990-1994); KIRO-TV (1995); CNN (1995-2004); Reuters Television (2005-present)
- Spouse(s): Kaoriko Kuge (m. 1998), St. Paul's Chapel (Columbia University)
- Parent(s): June C. Katayama; Hideo Katayama
- Website: www.facebook.com/fred.katayama

Frederick Hiroshi Katayama (born February 18, 1960) is a Japanese American television journalist, currently working as a news anchor for Reuters Television. He currently serves on the board of directors for the Japan Society and the U.S.-Japan Council.

== Education ==
Katayama graduated from Columbia College in 1982 with a Bachelor of Arts degree in East Asian studies, earning magna cum laude distinctions. He went on to the Columbia University Graduate School of Journalism and earned a Master of Science degree with a concentration in business reporting.

== Career ==
Katayama joined the Associated Press as a general assignment reporter in Tokyo before moving to Fortune Magazine as a correspondent for Japan and New York. He later worked for KIRO-TV as a reporter and appeared on NHK's Japan Business Today before joining CNN.

In August 2005, Katayama joined Reuters as its United States anchor for World Updates and interviewer for Reuters Industry Summits.

He has won numerous awards for his work in print, television and video journalism. He has won the National Journalism Award several times from the Asian American Journalists Association: in 2013 for his report on the science behind the knuckleball, in 1993 for his humorous report on a family of executives competing in the food industry, and in 1997, an honorable mention for his special report on the Asian American campaign financing scandal. He also was decorated with AAJA's ELP Outstanding Award for Leadership in 2004. In 2007, the show he anchored, Reuters Technology Week, was a Webby Award honoree. He received an honorable mention in 1997 from the Asian American Journalists Association for his special report on the Asian American campaign financing scandal. In April 2000, Katayama's report on broadband technology was cited when Moneyline won a Maxwell Media Award. In spring 2016, he, Senator Daniel Inouye, and U.S.-Japan Council president Irene Hirano were featured in the Japanese Overseas Migration Museum's exhibition on successful people worldwide with roots in Japan's Fukuoka prefecture.

Katayama was one of five writers, including former Senate Majority Leader and U.S. Ambassador Mike Mansfield, who wrote the book Japan: A Living Portrait, published in 1994.

== Personal life ==
On May 3, 1998, Katayama married Kaoriko Kuge, a Japanese news journalist, at the St. Paul's Chapel (Columbia University).

Katayama was born in Los Angeles and raised in Monterey Park, California to parents Hideo, owner of Pasadena's Jensen Printing Company, and June C. Katayama, a Japanese calligraphy teacher.
