= USJC =

USJC may refer to:

- United States Junior Chamber, a leadership training and civic organization for young people
- U.S.-Japan Council, an educational nonprofit that contributes to strengthening U.S.-Japan Relations
