= Sakie T. Fukushima =

Japanese business executive

Sakie Fukushima
- 橘・フクシマ・咲江
- Born: September 10, 1949 (age 76); California, U.S.
- Education: Seisen University; International Christian University; Harvard University; Stanford University
- Occupations: Executive search consultant Corporate director Author
- Spouse: Glen S. Fukushima
- Website: www.gandsga.co.jp

Sakie Tachibana Fukushima (Japanese: 橘・フクシマ・咲江) is a Japanese business executive who is currently the president and CEO of G&S Global Advisors Inc and has served on the board of numerous major Japanese companies. She has also authored a number of books on human resources and business.

== Education ==
Fukushima completed a Bachelor of Arts degree at Seisen University in 1972. In 1974, she earned a certificate in teaching Japanese at the International Christian University. This was followed by a master's in education (Ed.M.) at Harvard University in 1978. She also earned an MBA from Stanford University in 1987.

== Career ==
Fukushima worked as an instructor in Japanese at Harvard University from 1974 to 1980. In 1986, she was a summer associate at the World Bank. From 1987 to 1990, she was a consultant at Bain and Company.

In 1991 joined Korn/Ferry International. She later became the regional managing director for the company and then the chair of Korn/Ferry Japan. She became one of the first in Japan to specialize in executive search and leadership consulting. In 2001, she became president and CEO of the company in Japan, becoming a member of the international board from 1995 to 2007, and taking on the role of chairman in 2009.

In 2010, she founded G&S Global Advisors Inc., which provides advisory services on global talent strategy, board composition, and leadership development.

=== Boards and memberships ===
Fukushima has served as an outside director on the boards of 12 Japanese companies. She is currently on the board of Ushio, Inc. (since 2016), Konica Minolta, where she was the first woman to be appointed to the company's board (since 2019), Kyūshū Electric Power Company (since 2020), and Aozora Bank (since 2022).

She has also been an independent director on the boards of Kao Corporation (2002–2006), Sony Corporation (2003–2010), Benesse (2005–2010), eAccess Ltd (2009-2010), Parco Co., Ltd. (2010–2011), Mitsubishi Corporation (2013-2016), Bridgestone Corporation (2010-2018), Ajinomoto Co., Inc. (2011-2019), and J. Front Retailing (2012-2020). At Kao, Sony, Benesse, Bridgestone, Ajinomoto, and J. Front, she was the first woman to be a board member.

She has been a member of Keizai Dōyukai (the Japan Association of Corporate Executives) since April 1999, becoming an executive director in May 2003, and vice chairman from April 2011 to April 2015.

From 2008 to 2017, she was on the advisory board of the Development Bank of Japan.

=== Awards ===
She has been voted one of the top 10 women leaders in Japan. In 2008, she was one of nine women chosen as one of BusinessWeek's World’s 100 Most Influential Headhunters (and the only Japanese member of the list). In 2024, she and her husband were recognized with the "Distinguished Achievement Award" by Keizai Silicon Valley US–Japan Business Forum.

== Philanthropy ==
Fukushima and her husband Glen are philanthropists who regularly donate large amounts to support charities working to create educational opportunities. They are also patrons of the arts as major contributors to the San Francisco Museum of Modern Art and the Asian Art Museum in San Francisco. She has served as a vice president of the Japan chapter of the Stanford Business School Alumni Association and a member of the board of the Japan Stanford Association.

In 2023, the couple donated $3 million to endow the "Glen S. and Sakie T. Fukushima Fund at Deep Springs College, where her husband attended, which aims to bring world-class faculty to the college. The donation was described as a "game changer for the academic pillar at Deep Springs" by Jefferson Cowie.

They also donated $1 million to the Japan America Student Conference on its 90th anniversary in August 2024 to create the Glen S. & Sakie T. Fukushima JASC Alumni Fellowship Fund. The donation to JASC held special significance for the couple as they met during JASC 22 at Stanford University in 1970.

== Books authored ==
- 世界のリーダーに学んだ自分の考えの正しい伝え方. PHP研究所. August 19, 2014. ISBN 978-4569820408.
- 人財革命―あなたが組織に負けない「一流の人材」になるために. 祥伝社. July 26, 2007. ISBN 978-4396612870.
- 自信のなさは努力で埋められます 〜世界最大ヘッドハンティング会社の日本法人社長から貴女への提言〜. フィールドワイ. March 26, 2005. ISBN 978-4901722452.
- 40歳までの「売れるキャリア」の作りかた. 講談社. July 23, 2003. ISBN 978-4062642163.
- 売れる人材―エグゼクティブ・サーチの現場から. 日経BP社. 2000. ISBN 978-4822241865.
