= Mass media and politics in Japan =

This article's focus is mass media and their interaction with politics in Japan.

The five largest and most influential national newspapers are Yomiuri Shimbun, Asahi Shimbun, Mainichi Shimbun, Sankei Shimbun, and Nihon Keizai Shimbun. There are also more than 100 local newspapers. The population, 99 percent literate, also consumes record numbers of books and magazines. The latter range from high-quality comprehensive general circulation intellectual periodicals such as Sekai (World), Chuo Koron (Central Review), and Bungei Shunju (Literary Annals) to sarariman manga (salaryman comics), comic books for adults that depict the vicissitudes and fantasies of contemporary office workers, and weeklies specializing in scandals. Japan probably also leads the world in the translation of works by foreign scholars and novelists. Most of the classics of Western political thought, such as The Republic by Plato and Leviathan by Thomas Hobbes, for example, are available in Japanese.

News programs and special features on television also give viewers detailed reports on political, economic, and social developments both at home and abroad. The sole, noncommercial public radio and television broadcasting network, the Japan Broadcasting Corporation (Nippon Hoso Kyokai--NHK) provides generally balanced coverage. Unlike their counterparts in the United States, however, Japanese newscasters on NHK and commercial stations usually confine themselves to relating events and did not offer opinions or analysis.

The major magazines and newspapers are vocal critics of government policies and take great pains to map out the personal and financial ties that hold the conservative establishment together. Readers are regularly informed of matrimonial alliances between families of top politicians, civil servants, and business leaders, which in some ways resemble those of the old European aristocracy. The important print media are privately owned.

Observers, however, point out that the independence of the established press has been compromised by the pervasive "press club" system. Politicians and government agencies each have one of these clubs, which contain from 12 to almost 300 reporters from the different newspapers, magazines, and broadcast media. Club members are generally described as being closer to each other than they are to their employers. They also have a close and collaborative working relationship with the political figures or government agencies to which they are attached. There is little opportunity for reporters to establish a genuinely critical, independent stance because reporting distasteful matters might lead to exclusion from the club and thus inability to gain information and to write. Although the media have played a major role in exposing political scandals, some critics have accused the large newspapers, ostensibly oppositionist, of being little more than a conduit of government ideas to the people. Free-lance reporters, working outside the press club system, often made the real breakthroughs in investigative reporting. For example, a free-lance journalist published the first public accounts of Tanaka Kakuei's personal finances in a monthly magazine in 1974, even though the established press had access to this information.

== See also ==
- Japanese media
- Politics of Japan
- Radio Japan
