= Motoatsu Sakurai =

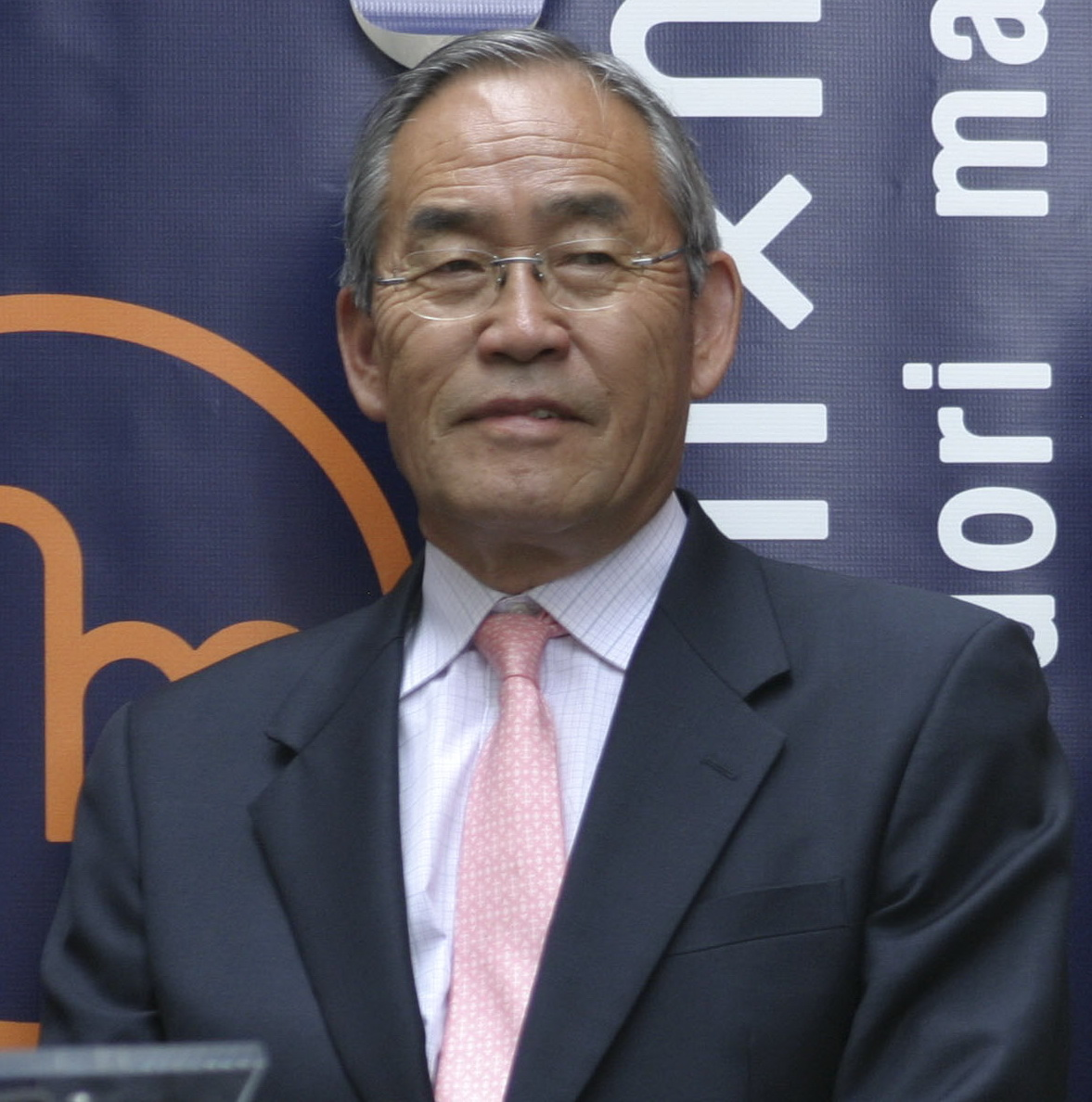
Sakurai in August 2009

Motoatsu Sakurai (桜井 本篤, Sakurai Motoatsu) (born May 24, 1944) is a Japanese businessman, a corporate executive in the private and public sectors, a diplomat, and president of the Japan Society in New York.

After graduating from Tokyo University Faculty of Law in 1968, he entered Mitsubishi Corporation (MC). During the course of his early work at MC, he received an MBA from INSEAD, Fontainebleau, France in May 1976. In the late 1970s, he spent four years with the World Bank and its affiliate, the International Finance Corporation, in Washington, D.C., working with Francophone countries in Africa.

== Mitsubishi executive ==
In the mid- to late-1980s, Sakurai served in several senior managerial capacities for Mitsubishi International Corporation (MIC) in New York and Washington, D.C. In 1995, after returning to Tokyo, he was named general manager of corporate planning and in 1998, general manager for regional strategy and coordination. By 2000, he rose to executive vice president. In April, 2003, he was named president and CEO of MIC.

Simultaneously, he was named president, Japanese Chamber of Commerce and Industry in New York. He has been a member of the board of directors of the Partnership for New York City, the Corporate Leadership Committee of Carnegie Hall, and the executive committee of the Nippon Club.

== Ambassador and consul general ==
Following a 40-year career in the private sector, Sakurai accepted appointment as ambassador and consul general of Japan in New York. He served from March 2006 through March 2009; and he was the first business executive to serve in this diplomatic capacity.

== President of Japan Society ==
In 2009, Sakurai became president of New York's Japan Society. He is the first Japanese person to lead the organization since its founding in 1907. He served as member of Japan Society's board of directors from 2003 through 2006; and he continued in a role as Honorary Director from 2006 through 2009. He anticipates paying closer attention to the Japan side of the Japan Society by trying to make Americans as comfortable with Japanese culture as the Japanese have become with American culture. Tentative plans include expanding the society's corporate outreach with conferences, lectures and symposiums.

== Family ==
Motoatsu and Nobuko Sakurai live in New York. The couple has two daughters who grew up in the Washington, D.C., area and now live and work in the United States.
