= Japan National Press Club =

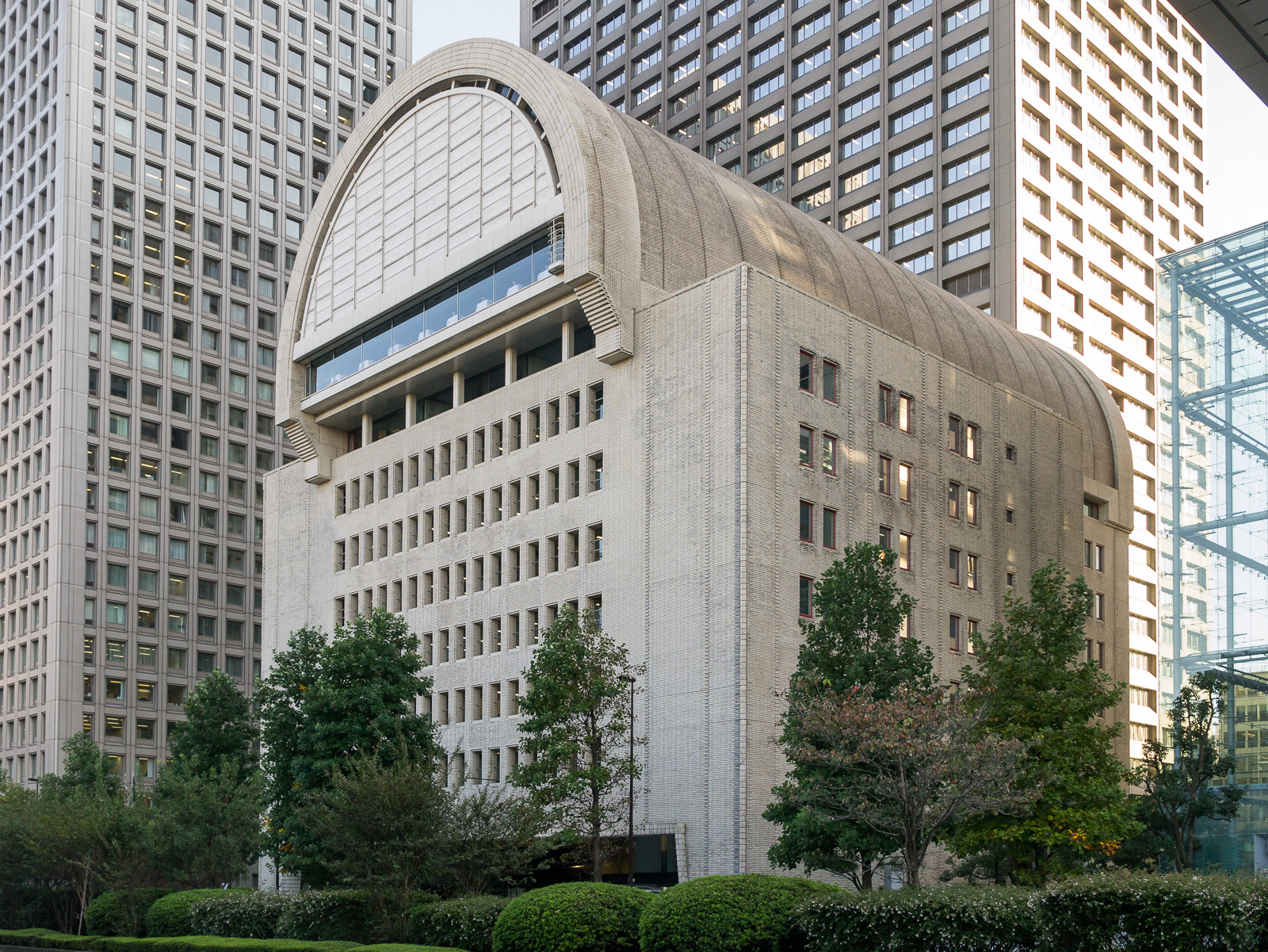
Japan Press Center Building, Chiyoda, Tokyo

The Japan National Press Club (日本記者クラブ, Nihon Kisha Kurabu) is an association of journalists in Japan.

== History ==
This was established as a national press centre, in place of Foreign Correspondents' Club of Japan, in November 1969.

== See also ==
- Press club
- Mass media and politics in Japan
- Kisha club
