= The U.S.-Japan Conference on Cultural and Educational Interchange (CULCON) =

The U.S.-Japan Conference on Cultural and Educational Interchange (CULCON) is a bi-national advisory panel to the U.S. and Japanese governments that serves to elevate and strengthen the vital cultural and educational foundations of the U.S.-Japan relationship.

== Mission ==
According to its website, CULCON's mission is: “The U.S.-Japan Conference on Cultural and Educational Interchange (CULCON) is a bi-national advisory panel that serves to elevate and strengthen the vital cultural and educational foundations of the U.S.-Japan relationship, and to strengthen connections between U.S. and Japan leadership in those fields. It works to ensure that the best of new ideas for cultural, educational and intellectual activity and exchange are implemented as operational programs.”

== History ==
The U.S.-Japan Conference on Cultural and Educational Interchange (CULCON) is a program of the U.S. Department of State in the United States and the Ministry of Foreign Affairs in Japan CULCON originated in a series of discussions between President John F. Kennedy and Prime Minister Hayato Ikeda in 1961 as a high-level advisory panel to the two governments for educational and cultural exchanges. This arrangement was formalized by an exchange of memoranda between the two governments in 1968. Beginning in 1978, CULCON became a program of the United States Information Agency (USIA). In 1999, with the restructuring of USIA and the Department of State, CULCON returned to the U.S. Department of State, Office of the Undersecretary for Public Diplomacy and Public Affairs. In 1991, permanent secretariats were established in Tokyo and Washington to provide continuity to CULCON activities. In the U.S., the secretariat was established within the Japan-U.S. Friendship Commission, an independent federal agency that supports reciprocal people-to-people understanding and promotes partnerships that advance common interests between Japan and the United States.In Japan, the secretariat was established in the Japan Foundation, Japan's first public institution dedicated to sharing Japanese culture and language with people throughout the world. Since then, U.S. CULCON has become a high-level, dynamic organization that has identified timely issues and responded with a range of creative solutions in areas such as educational exchange, media, digital culture, arts exchange and information access and global leaders. The solutions are a direct result of the gatherings and discussions of CULCON's unique grouping of public and private sector members and the engagement of its Panelists. Most recently, CULCON convened a bi-national Educational Task Force to examine decreasing trends of Japanese students studying abroad in the U.S. The Task Force made recommendations to leaders in both nations to double the number of study abroad students in each country by 2020.

== CULCON Education Task Force ==
In January 2013, CULCON members from Japan and the United States met in Hawaii to examine downward trends in bilateral student exchanges and to create a bi-national Task Force that would make recommendations concerning the data in order to increase student exchanges. The Task Force convened to examine an alarming decrease in the number of Japanese students in the United States and to make recommendations to leaders in both nations towards an ambitious goal: to double the number of study abroad students in each country by 2020. Over the past 15 years, there has been a 57 percent drop in the number of Japanese students studying in the United States, from over 47,000 students in 1997–1998 to fewer than 20,000 in 2011–2012. During the same period, Japan fell from being the number-one country of origin for foreign students on U.S. campuses to seventh place. In the same period, U.S. citizens studying in Japan tripled, reaching 6,000, largely as a result of CULCON efforts established in the 1990s. To examine these trends and their economic implications for both countries, CULCON convened a task force of specialists from a variety of fields and perspectives, including the U.S. Department of Education and the U.S. Department of State, as well as the Japanese Ministry of Education and the Ministry of Foreign Affairs. In May 2013 the CULCON Education Task Force issued a Report and Recommendations. Report addresses country specific recommendations as well as bi-national cooperative actions. The Task Force encourages for-profit and nonprofit private sector, the higher education community and the governments for both countries to take specific measures to improve English proficiency of Japanese students, for example, and a recommendation to reform the Japanese academic calendar would enable more Japanese students to study abroad and to internationalize Japanese universities. The Report also examines ways the Japanese hiring practices could be reformed to allow more students to study abroad. Collective actions for both countries include providing additional funding to students to compensate for the high costs of studying abroad.

In addition to recommending these institutional changes, the Task Force Report highlights both governments’ role in creating an environment that will encourage overseas exchange. In June 2014, the Report was presented in Tokyo to Prime Minister Shinzo Abe and in Washington D.C. to Undersecretary Tara Sonenshine. Around the same time, Prime Minister Abe announced a series of structural reforms to underpin economic growth. Key themes of the policy include improving English language instruction, included replacing 1500 lecturers in eight Japanese universities with foreign professors, doubling the number of foreign professors who are in Japan now; lifting eight Japanese institutions into the global top 100 in the next ten years (currently, Tokyo University in 27th in the world and Kyoto University is 52nd); using the Test of English as a Foreign Language (TOEFL) to raise the standard of English in bureaucrats and students alike. The plan would mandate that individuals reach or exceed a threshold in scores on the TOEFL to gain college admission and to qualify for government jobs; and finally, collaborate with overseas counterparts to offer joint degrees to encourage studying abroad and learning English. Abe has also asserted that he would like to make English a required course starting from elementary schools and has expressed interest in reducing the financial burden to students in order to allow them to travel and study abroad. Many of the aforementioned reforms are directly correlated with the Recommendations made by the CULCON Education Task Force.

== Bibliography ==
- Hayden, Craig. The Rhetoric of Soft Power: Public Diplomacy in Global Contexts. Lanham, MD: Lexington, 2012
