= Japan America Student Conference =

The Japan-America Student Conference (日米学生会議, Nichibei Gakusei Kaigi) (JASC) is an educational and cultural exchange program for university students.

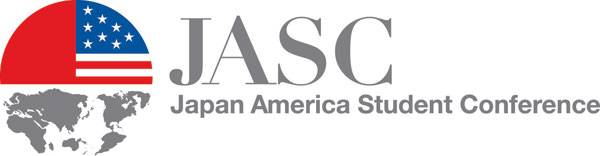
Japan-American Student Conference Logo

== Overview ==
Each year, a group of students from universities in the United States and Japan spend four weeks living, traveling, and studying together. Students work to deepen the ties between the relations between the two countries through discussions about key topics in U.S.-Japan relations. The delegates collaborate with leaders in business, academia, and government on contemporary social, economic, and political issues that face the U.S., Japan and the world. JASC is student managed by 16 Executive Committee members from both countries who work in collaboration with International Student Conferences in Washington, D.C. and the International Education Center in Tokyo.

== History ==
JASC is the oldest student-run exchange between these two countries. In 1934, a small group of Japanese university students concerned about the deteriorating relations between the United States and Japan initiated the first JASC in Tokyo. The following year, American students reciprocated by hosting the second JASC. This began the tradition of alternating host countries and holding JASC annually. Although World War II forced the suspension of JASC, it was revived in 1947 by Japanese and American students living in Japan. From its origin, JASC has been student-run, which ensures the creation of dynamic discussion focused on pressing current issues. Throughout its rich history, many JASC alumni from both nations have gone on to achieve distinction in business, academia, government and other circles.

== Program ==
The conference venue alternates between Japan and the United States every year. Over the course of four weeks participating students visit 4-5 locations in the host country. During this time, they engage in academic round-table discussions, cultural and social events, lectures and panel presentations, field trips, and community service activities. These experiences provide a foundation for mutual understanding, social awareness, cultural sensitivity, and an exchange of ideas. More importantly, the bonds that form as a result of the 72 students living and working together will offer the basis for lifelong friendships that further strengthen the ties between Japan and the United States.

In recent years the conference has attempted to include discussions of the rise of China as a major power in Asia by holding trilateral forums with Chinese students. Additionally, a new Korea-America Student Conference has been established to improve ties between the United States and its regional ally South Korea.

=== Roundtables ===
The core of JASC is the "roundtable," a subgroup of ten students; four from the Japanese delegation and four from the American delegation, with one member of the executive committee from each delegation to act as roundtable leaders. The two Executive Committee Chairs do not lead a roundtable.

Roundtable topics vary from year to year, and are decided by the executive committee for the conference. Roundtables aim to be diverse and cover a broad range of topics pertaining to U.S.-Japan relations. The 63rd JASC included the "Ethics of Technology and Its Impact on Human Life" roundtable, "Interpretation of History in International Relations" roundtable, and the "Comprehensive Security" roundtable, among others.

Delegates spend much time in roundtable groups. Aside from discussions and debates, roundtables also embark on field trips to locations pertaining to the roundtable topic. 63rd JASC field trips included the Kashiwazaki-Kariwa Nuclear Power Plant in Niigata Prefecture, Lake Biwa in Shiga Prefecture, Marine Corps Air Station Futenma and Camp Foster in Okinawa, and the Embassy of the United States in Tokyo.

=== Forums ===
Each site also features a forum where delegates engage in lectures with prominent experts and professors in numerous fields. Apart from these forums, delegates also prepare presentations for two forums of their own – the Midterm and Final Forum. These forums are chances for each roundtable to present to the entire delegation the issues they discussed throughout the conference. Local high school and university students, as well as government officials and alumni are invited to attend these forums.

=== Receptions ===
Delegates also have the opportunity to engage in alumni receptions to network with past JASC alumni.

== Delegate selection ==
American delegates are selected from all fields of study and will range from first year college students to Ph.D. candidates. Delegates need not be Asian studies majors or studying Japanese language because English is the primary language of the Conference. In fact, students of other disciplines are strongly encouraged to apply in order to broaden the depth of student representation. Applicants are asked to submit short essays, one longer essay, a writing sample, current transcript and letters of recommendation. Upon selection, delegates prepare a roundtable-related paper prior to the Conference.

== List of notable alumni ==
- Toru Hashimoto – chairman, The Fuji Bank, Japan
- Yutaka Katayama – Former Chairman & President, Nissan North America, Automobile Hall of Fame, Detroit
- Kiichi Miyazawa – Former Prime Minister of Japan; Former Minister of Finance
- Henry A. Kissinger, '51 – chairman, Kissinger Associates; U.S. Secretary of State 1973–1977; Nobel Peace Prize 1973
- Fulton J. Freeman, '34—Career diplomat; U.S.Ambassador Colombia 1961–1963; U.S. Ambassador Mexico 1964-1969
