= Daniel Inouye =

American attorney and statesman (1924–2012)

Dan Inouye
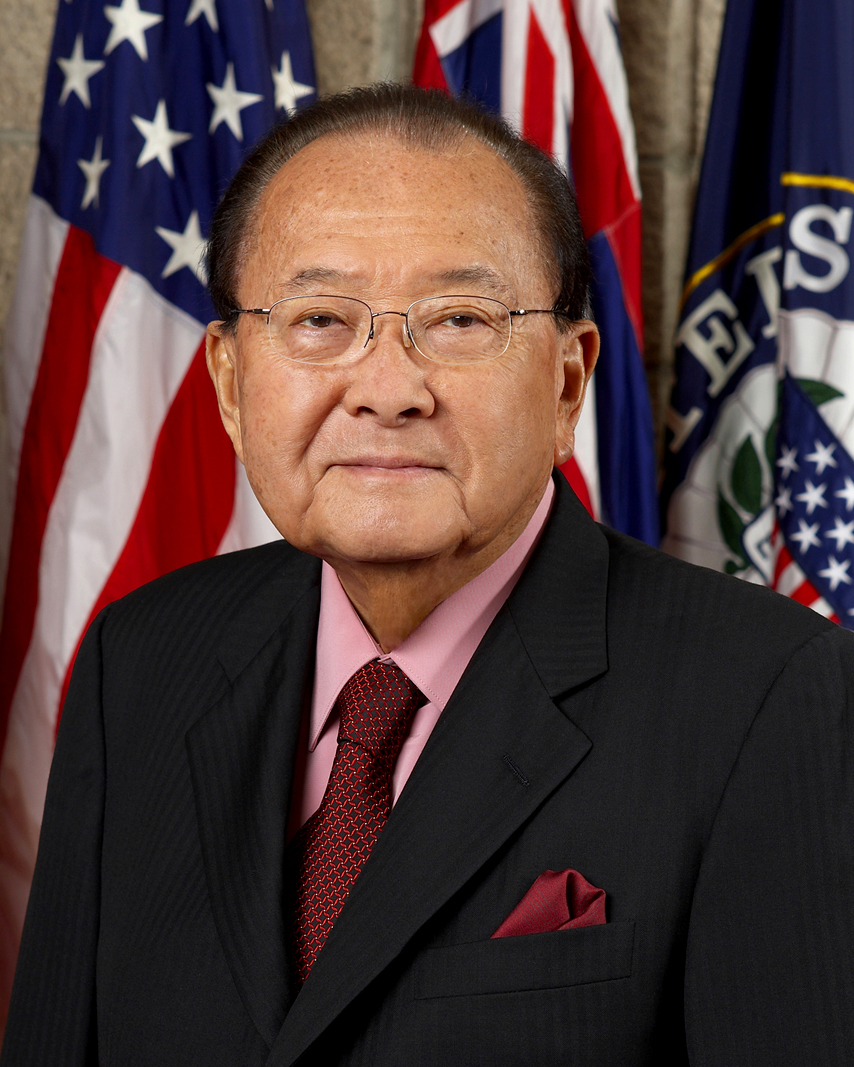
- Official portrait, 2008

President pro tempore of the United States Senate
- In office June 28, 2010 – December 17, 2012
- Preceded by: Robert Byrd
- Succeeded by: Patrick Leahy
Senate positions
Chair of the Senate Appropriations Committee
In office January 3, 2009 – December 17, 2012
Preceded by	Robert Byrd
Succeeded by	Barbara Mikulski
Chair of the Senate Commerce Committee
In office January 3, 2007 – January 3, 2009
Preceded by	Ted Stevens
Succeeded by	Jay Rockefeller
Chair of the Senate Indian Affairs Committee
In office June 6, 2001 – January 3, 2003
Preceded by	Ben Nighthorse Campbell
Succeeded by	Ben Nighthorse Campbell
In office January 3, 1987 – January 3, 1995
Preceded by	Mark Andrews
Succeeded by	John McCain
Secretary of the Senate Democratic Conference
In office January 3, 1977 – January 3, 1989
Leader	Mike Mansfield; Robert Byrd
Preceded by	Ted Moss
Succeeded by	David Pryor
Chair of the Senate Intelligence Committee
In office May 19, 1976 – January 27, 1978
Preceded by	Frank Church (Church Committee)
Succeeded by	Birch Bayh

United States Senator from Hawaii
- In office January 3, 1963 – December 17, 2012
- Preceded by: Oren Long
- Succeeded by: Brian Schatz

Member of the U.S. House of Representatives from Hawaii's at-large district
- In office August 21, 1959 – January 3, 1963
- Preceded by: John Burns (Delegate)
- Succeeded by: Thomas Gill

Personal details
- Born: Daniel Ken Inouye; September 7, 1924 Honolulu, Territory of Hawaii
- Died: December 17, 2012 (aged 88) Bethesda, Maryland, U.S.
- Resting place: National Memorial Cemetery of the Pacific
- Party: Democratic
- Spouses: Margaret Shinobu Awamura (m. 1948; died 2006); Irene Hirano (m. 2008)
- Children: 1
- Education: University of Hawaiʻi at Mānoa (BA); George Washington University (JD)

Military service
- Branch/service: United States Army
- Years of service: 1943–1947
- Rank: Captain
- Unit: 442nd Regimental Combat Team
- Battles/wars: World War II; Spring 1945 offensive in Italy (WIA)
- Awards: Medal of Honor; Bronze Star; Purple Heart; European-African-Middle Eastern Campaign Medal; World War II Victory Medal; Presidential Medal of Freedom
- Inouye's voice Inouye criticizing the 1991 AUMF against Iraq. Recorded January 12, 1991

Daniel Ken Inouye (/iːˈnoʊˌeɪ/ ee-NOH-ay; September 7, 1924 – December 17, 2012) was an American attorney, soldier, and statesman who represented Hawaii in the United States Senate from 1963 until his death in 2012. A member of the Democratic Party, he was the most-senior member of the Senate when he died. He is the second-longest serving U.S. senator in history. Prior to his tenure in the Senate, Inouye served in the Hawaii Territorial Legislature and the United States House of Representatives from 1959 to 1963.

Inouye was born and raised in Honolulu, in what was then the Territory of Hawaii. After enrolling at the University of Hawaiʻi at Mānoa as a premedical student, he applied at the 442nd Infantry Regiment during World War II, and during that time, he lost his right arm. After the war, he earned a Bachelor of Arts degree at the University of Hawaiʻi at Mānoa in 1950, and a Juris Doctor degree from George Washington University Law School in 1952. He was then elected to Hawaii's territorial House of Representatives the following year and was elected to the territorial Senate in 1957. When Hawaii achieved statehood in 1959, Inouye was elected as its first member of the U.S. House of Representatives.

Inouye was elected to the U.S. Senate in 1962. He was re-elected in 1968 and re-elected seven more times. He was the second Asian American U.S. senator in history, following Hawaii Republican Hiram Fong. Because of his seniority, Inouye became president pro tempore of the Senate following the death of Robert Byrd in 2010, making him third in the presidential line of succession after the vice president and the speaker of the House of Representatives.

Inouye died at the age of 88 in December 2012, due to respiratory complications. He never lost an election in 58 years as an elected official, and he exercised an exceptionally large influence on Hawaii politics. Inouye was a posthumous recipient of the Presidential Medal of Freedom and the Order of the Paulownia Flowers. Among other public structures named after Inouye, Honolulu International Airport has since been renamed Daniel K. Inouye International Airport in his memory. Inouye was also a Medal of Honor recipient for his heroism during World War II.

== Early life (1924–1942) ==
Daniel Ken Inouye was born in Honolulu, Territory of Hawaii on September 7, 1924. His father, Hyotaro Inouye, was a jeweler who had immigrated to Hawaii from Japan as a child. His mother, Kame (née Imanaga) Inouye, was a homemaker born on Maui to Japanese immigrants. Her parents died young, and she was adopted and raised by a family in Honolulu. Both of Daniel's parents were Christians. They met at the River Street Methodist Church in Honolulu and married in 1923. Inouye was a Nisei (second-generation Japanese-American) through his father and a Sansei (third-generation) through his mother. He was named after his mother's adoptive father.

Inouye grew up in Bingham Tract, a Chinese-American enclave in Honolulu. He was raised Christian, and was the oldest of four children. As a child, Inouye collected homing pigeons, which were hatched from eggs given to him at an army base in Schofield Barracks in return for Inouye cleaning the coops. As a teenager, he worked on the local beaches teaching tourists how to surf. Inouye's parents raised him and his siblings with a mix of American and Japanese customs. His parents spoke English at home, but had their children attend a private Japanese language school in addition to public school. Inouye dropped out of the Japanese school in 1939 because he disagreed with his instructor's anti-American rhetoric, and focused on his studies at President William McKinley High School. Inouye intended to go to college and medical school after his planned 1942 graduation.

Inouye witnessed the attack on Pearl Harbor on December 7, 1941, while still a high school senior. The Japanese surprise attack brought the United States into World War II. Being a volunteer first aid instructor with the Red Cross, he was called on by his supervisor to report to a Red Cross station set up at Lunalilo Elementary School. There, Inouye tended to civilians injured by antiaircraft shells that had fallen into the city. After the United States declared war on Japan the next day, Inouye took up a paid job from his Red Cross supervisor to work there as a medical aide. For the rest of his senior year, Inouye attended school during the day and worked at the Red Cross station at night. He graduated from McKinley High School in 1942.

Although Inouye wanted to join the Armed Forces when he completed high school, Japanese-Americans were excluded from doing so at that time. Beginning in February 1942, the United States Department of War had declared all Japanese-Americans as "enemy aliens", which meant they could not volunteer or be drafted for military service (an exception was made for the previously established 298th and 299th Infantry Regiments, which became the 100th Infantry Battalion in 1942). Inouye enrolled at the University of Hawaiʻi at Mānoa in September 1942 as a premedical student with the goal of becoming a surgeon.

== Army service (1943–1947) ==
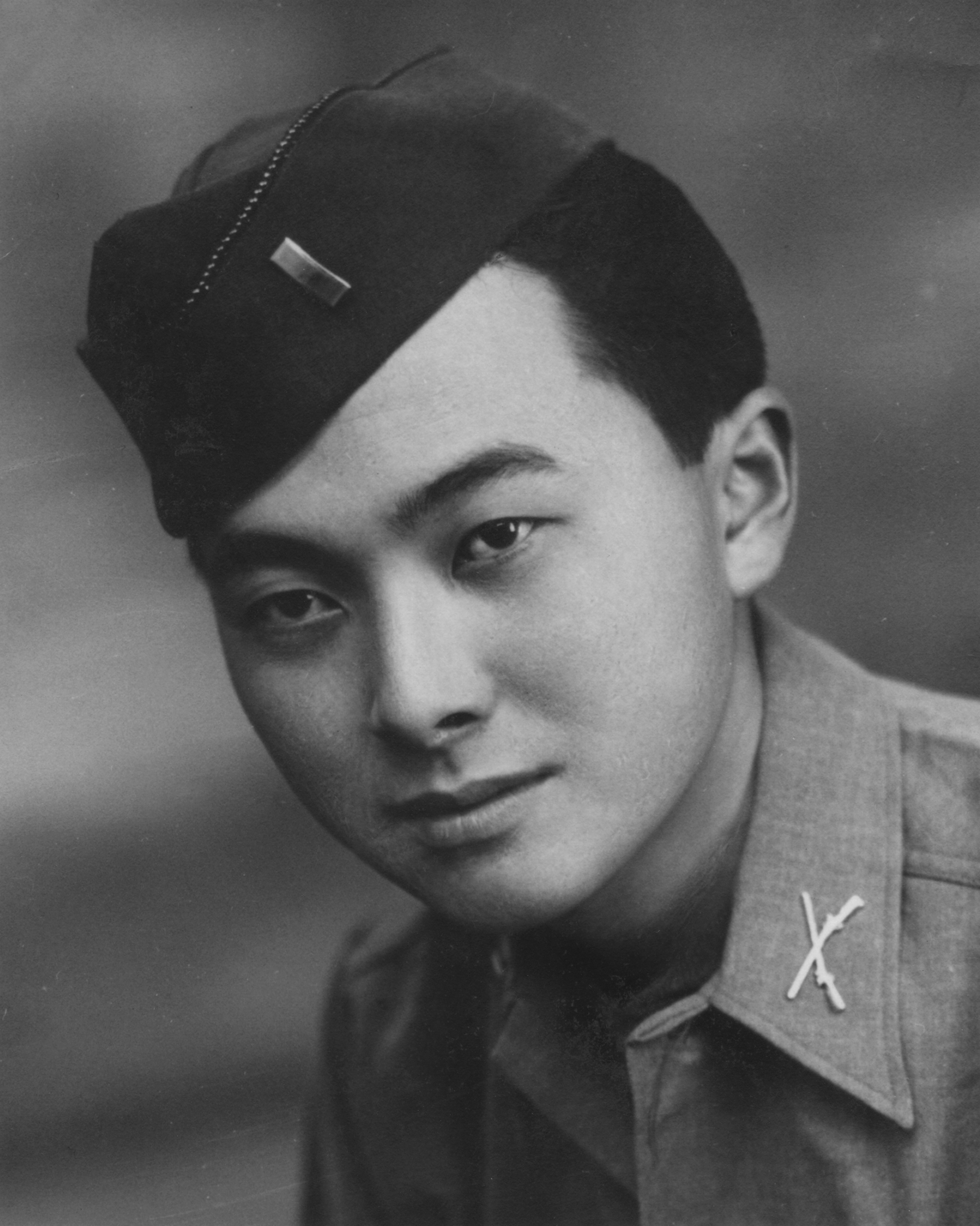
Inouye as a first lieutenant in the U.S. Army

In March 1943, U.S. President Franklin D. Roosevelt established the 442nd Regimental Combat Team, an all-Nisei combat unit. Inouye applied and was initially turned down because his work at the Red Cross was deemed critical, but was inducted later that month. The unit was composed of over 2,500 Nisei from Hawaii, and 800 from the mainland. Inouye went with his unit in April to Camp Shelby in Mississippi for a 10-month training period, postponing his medical studies. While in Mississippi, the unit visited the Rohwer War Relocation Center in Arkansas, where Inouye witnessed the internment of Japanese Americans first hand.

The 442nd shipped off to Italy in May 1944 after the conclusion of their training, shortly before the liberation of Rome. Inouye was promoted to sergeant within the first three months of fighting in the Italian countryside north of Rome. The 442nd was then sent to eastern France, where they seized the towns of Bruyères, Belmont, and Biffontaine from the Germans. In late October, the regiment was transferred to the Vosges Mountains region of France, where they rescued 211 members of the 1st Battalion of the 141st Infantry Regiment, otherwise known as the "Lost Battalion". Inouye received a battlefield commission to second lieutenant for his actions there, becoming the youngest officer in his regiment. During the battle, a shot struck him in the chest directly above his heart, but the bullet was stopped by the two silver dollars he happened to have stacked in his shirt pocket. He continued to carry the coins throughout the war in his shirt pocket as good luck charms, but lost them later, shortly before the battle in which he lost his arm. The 442nd spent the next several months near Nice, guarding the French-Italian border until early 1945, when they were called to Northern Italy to assist with an assault on German strongholds in the Apennine Mountains.

=== World War II wounds and heroism ===
On April 21, 1945, Inouye was grievously wounded while leading an assault on the heavily defended Colle Musatello ridge near San Terenzo Monti, Tuscany during the Allied Spring 1945 offensive in Italy. The ridge served as a strongpoint of the German line of fortifications known as the Gothic Line, the last line of German defensive works in Italy. During a flanking maneuver against German machine gun nests, Inouye was shot in the stomach from 40 yards away. Ignoring his wound, Inouye proceeded with the attack and together with the unit, destroyed the first two machine gun nests. As his squad distracted the third machine gunner, the injured Inouye crawled toward the final bunker and came within 10 yards. As he prepared to toss a grenade into the bunker, a German soldier fired out a 30 mm Schiessbecher antipersonnel rifle grenade at Inouye, striking Inouye in the right elbow. Although it failed to detonate, the blunt force of the grenade amputated most of his right arm at the elbow. The nature of the injury caused Inouye's arm muscles to involuntarily squeeze the grenade tightly via a reflex arc, preventing his arm from going limp and dropping a live grenade at his feet. This injury left Inouye disabled, in terrible pain, under fire with minimal cover and staring at a live grenade "clenched in a fist that suddenly didn't belong to me anymore."

Inouye's platoon moved to his aid, but Inouye shouted for them to keep back out of fear his severed fist would involuntarily relax and drop his own grenade. As the German inside the bunker began reloading his rifle, Inouye pried the live hand grenade from his severed right hand and tossed it into the bunker, killing the German. Stumbling to his feet, Inouye continued forward, killing at least one more German before sustaining his fifth and final wound of the day in his left leg. Inouye fell unconscious, and awoke to see the worried men of his platoon hovering over him. His only comment before being carried away was to gruffly order them back to their positions, saying "Nobody called off the war!" By the end of the day, the ridge had fallen to American control, without the loss of any soldiers in Inouye's platoon. The remainder of Inouye's mutilated right arm was later amputated at a field hospital without proper anesthesia, as he had been given too much morphine at an aid station and it was feared any more would lower his blood pressure enough to kill him. The war in Europe ended on May 8, less than three weeks later.

=== Rehabilitation and discharge ===
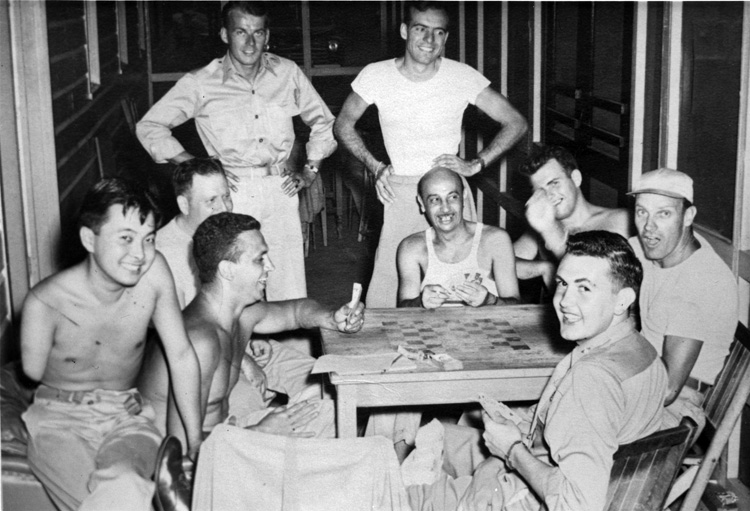
Inouye (left) with his friend and future fellow senator Bob Dole (next to Inouye), playing cards while recovering at Percy Jones Army Hospital

Shortly before the Japanese surrender and end of World War II in August 1945, Inouye was shipped back to the United States to recover for eleven months at a rehabilitation center for wounded soldiers in Atlantic City, New Jersey. In mid-1946, Inouye was transferred to the Percy Jones Army Hospital in Battle Creek, Michigan, to continue his rehabilitation for nine more months. While recovering there, Inouye met future Republican senator and presidential candidate Bob Dole, then a fellow patient. The two became friends and would often play bridge together. Dole shared with Inouye his long-term plans to attend law school and become an attorney, and later run for state legislature and eventually the United States Congress. With Inouye's plans to become a surgeon dashed due to his injury, Dole's plans for a career in public service inspired Inouye to consider entering politics. Inouye ultimately entered Congress before Dole, who was first elected to the U.S. House in 1960. The two remained lifelong friends. In 2003, the hospital was renamed the Hart–Dole–Inouye Federal Center in honor of the two World War II veterans, as well as Democratic senator Philip Hart, who had been a patient at the hospital after sustaining injuries on D-Day.

Inouye was honorably discharged with the rank of captain in May 1947 after 20 months of rehabilitation. At the time, he was a recipient of the Bronze Star Medal, Distinguished Service Cross, and three Purple Hearts. Many in his regiment believed that, were he not Japanese-American, he would have been awarded the Medal of Honor, the nation's highest military award. Inouye eventually received the Medal of Honor on June 21, 2000, from President Bill Clinton, along with 19 other Japanese-American servicemen in the 442nd.

== Education and early political career (1947–1962) ==
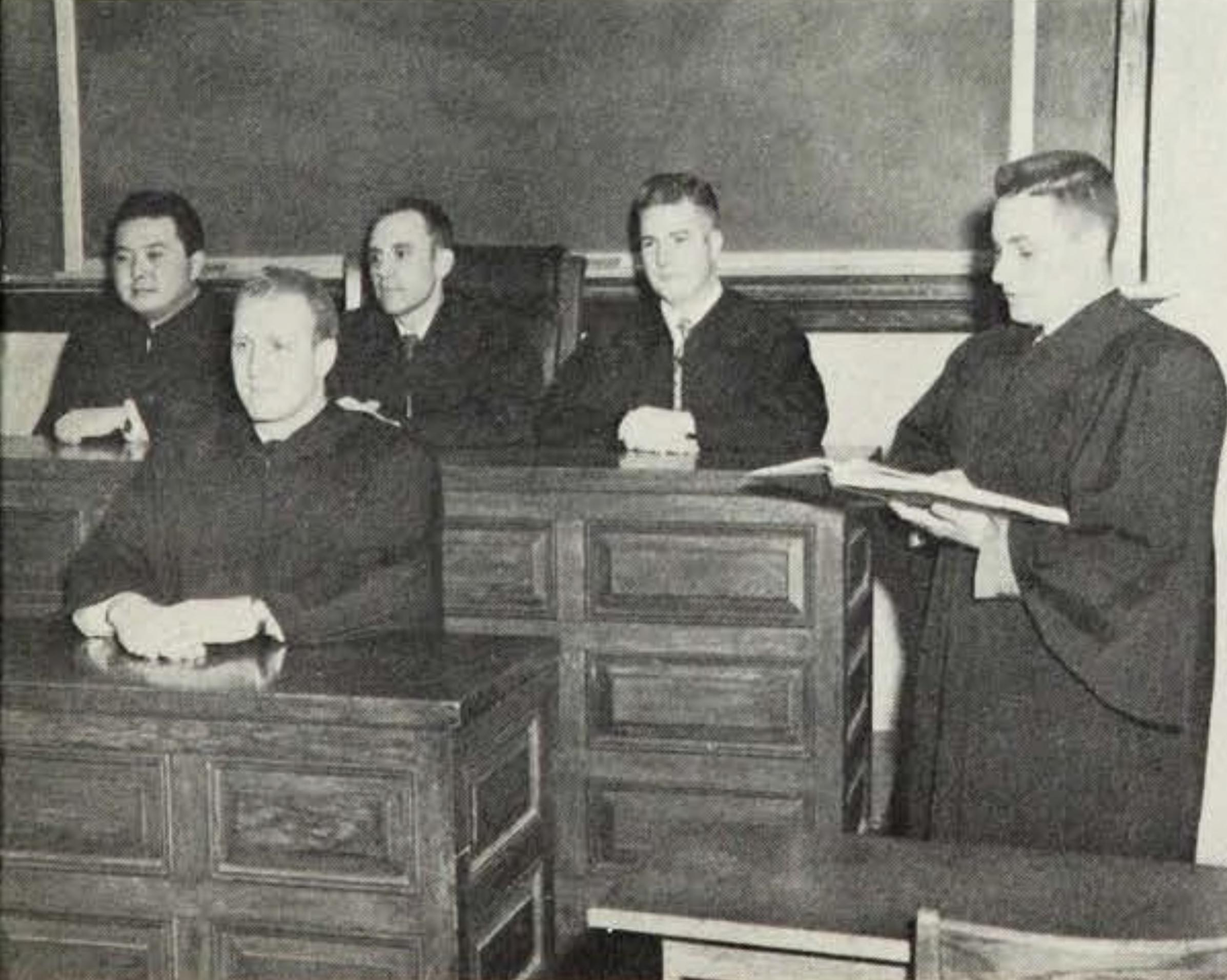
Inouye (far left) as exchequer of Phi Delta Phi, a legal fraternity at George Washington University, 1952

Inouye decided to study law, hoping that doing so would lead him into a political career. He enrolled at the University of Hawaiʻi at Mānoa in late 1947 as a prelaw student, majoring in government and economics. Inouye relied on the financial benefits of the G.I. Bill to fund his education. When not in class, he volunteered for the Democratic Party at the Honolulu County Democratic Committee. Inouye had been talked into joining the party by John A. Burns, a former police captain and future governor, who had ties to the Japanese American community. Though the territory of Hawaii had been politically dominated by the Republican Party, Burns convinced Inouye that the Democratic Party could help Japanese Hawaiians achieve social and economic reform.

After graduating in 1950, Inouye moved with his wife to Washington D.C. so he could continue his studies at George Washington University Law School. While there, Inouye volunteered at the Democratic National Committee (DNC) headquarters to gain more experience to bring back with him to Hawaii. Inouye earned his J.D. degree in two years, and moved back with his wife to Hawaii in late 1952. Inouye spent the next year studying for the Hawaii bar exam and volunteering with the Democratic Party. After passing the bar exam in August 1953, Inouye was appointed assistant public prosecutor for the city and county of Honolulu by the city mayor and fellow Democrat John Wilson.

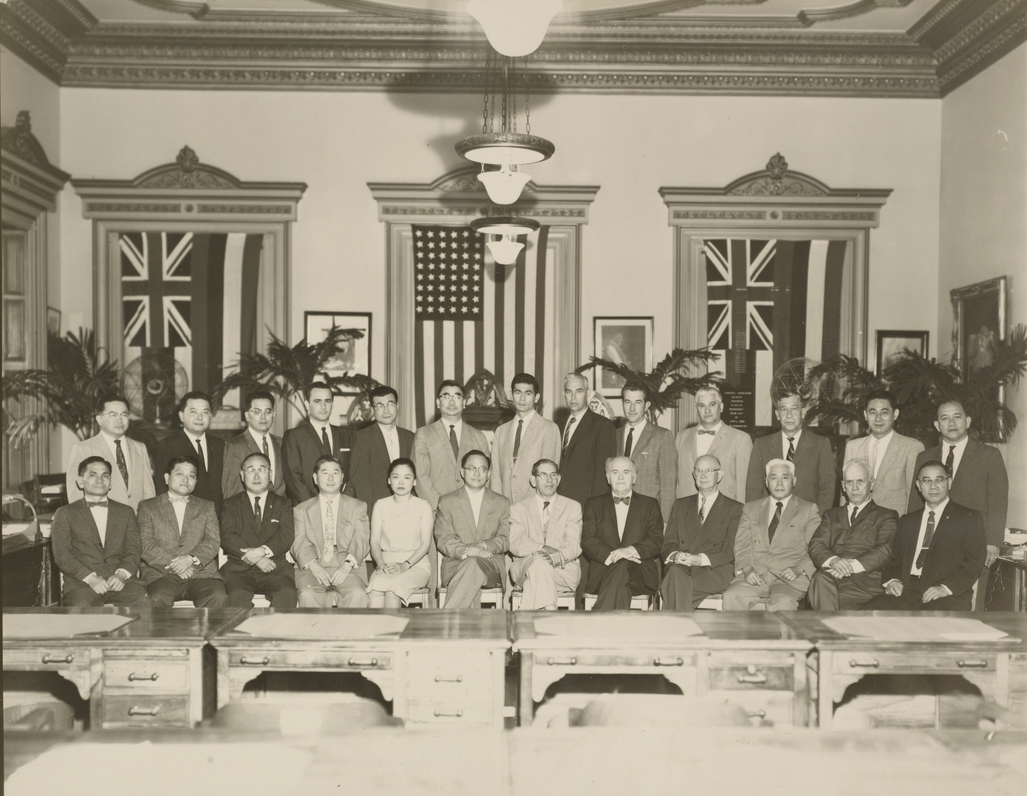
The Hawaii Territorial Senate in 1958. Inouye is standing second from left.

At the urging of Burns, Inouye successfully ran for the Hawaii Territorial House of Representatives in the November 1954 election, representing the Fourth District. The election came to be known as the Hawaii Democratic Revolution of 1954, as the long-entrenched Republican control of the Hawaii Territorial Legislature abruptly ended with a wave of Democratic candidates taking their seats. The election also filled the legislature with Japanese-American politicians, who previously held few seats. Inouye was immediately elected majority leader. He served two terms there, and was elected to the Hawaii territorial senate in 1957. Midway through Inouye's first term, Hawaii achieved statehood. He won a seat in the U.S. House of Representatives as Hawaii's first full member, and took office August 21, 1959, the same date Hawaii became a state. Inouye was re-elected in 1960. While in the House of Representatives, Inouye voted in favor of the Civil Rights Acts of 1960 and for the 24th Amendment to the U.S. Constitution.

== United States Senate (1963–2012) ==
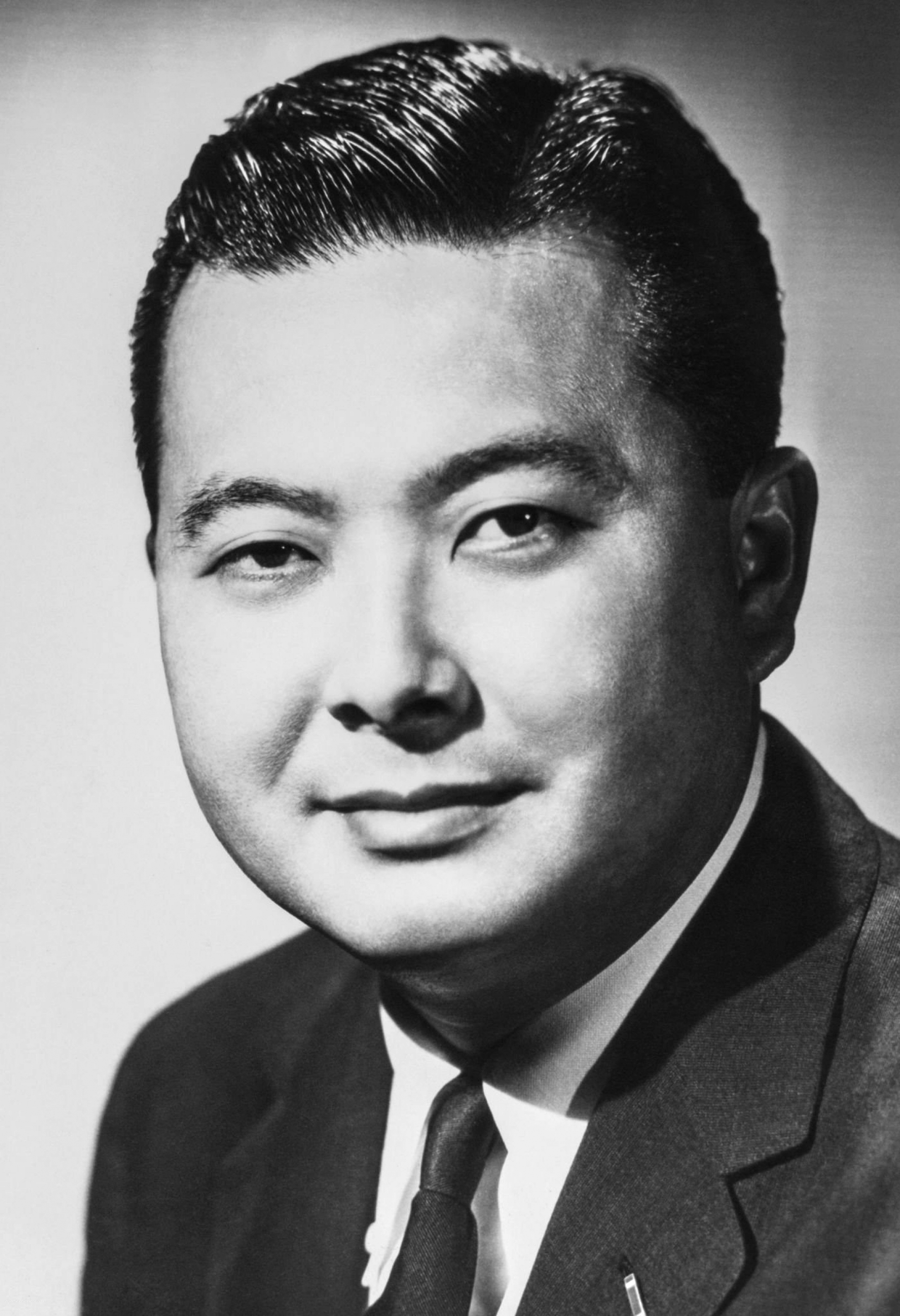
Official portrait, 1963

In 1962, Inouye was elected to the U.S. Senate, succeeding retiring fellow Democrat Oren E. Long.

Inouye was the chairman of the Senate Intelligence Committee between 1976 and 1979 and the chairman of the Senate Indian Affairs Committee between 1987 and 1995. He introduced the National Museum of the American Indian Act in 1984, which led to the opening of the National Museum of the American Indian in 2004. Inouye was chairman of the Senate Indian Affairs Committee between 2001 and 2003, chairman of the Senate Commerce Committee between 2007 and 2009, and chairman of the Senate Appropriations Committee between 2009 and 2012.

Inouye voted in favor of the Civil Rights Act of 1964, Civil Rights Act of 1968, and the Voting Rights Act of 1965.

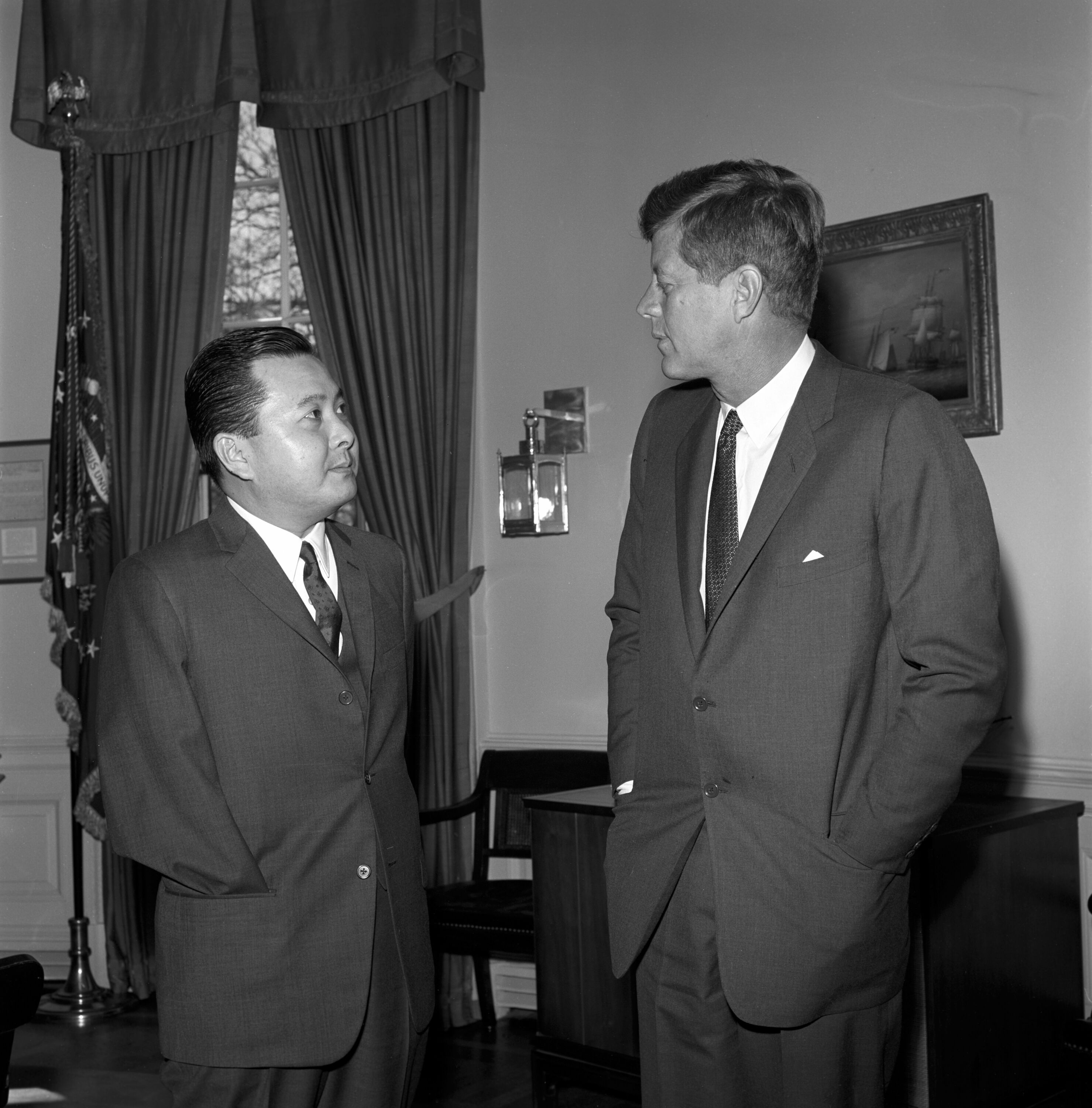
Inouye with President John F. Kennedy in 1962

In August 1968, President Lyndon B. Johnson placed a phone call to vice president and Democratic presumptive presidential nominee Hubert Humphrey, urging him to select Inouye as his running mate. Johnson went as far as to request a background check on Inouye from the Federal Bureau of Investigation. Johnson told Humphrey that Inouye's World War II injuries would silence Humphrey's critics on the Vietnam War: "He answers Vietnam with that empty sleeve. He answers your problems with (Republican presumptive presidential nominee and former vice president Richard) Nixon with that empty sleeve", Johnson said. Humphrey eventually chose Edmund Muskie as his running mate, and lost the election. According to his chief of staff, Jennifer Sabas, Inouye knew that he was being considered as a vice presidential pick, but was uninterested in the possibility, apparently content with his Senate position.

Inouye delivered the keynote address at the turbulent 1968 Democratic National Convention in Chicago and gained national attention for his service on the Senate Watergate Committee.

Inouye was also involved in the Iran-Contra investigations of the 1980s, chairing a special committee (Senate Select Committee on Secret Military Assistance to Iran and the Nicaraguan Opposition) from 1987 until 1989. In his closing statement of the hearings, Inouye commented that the investigations had revealed the participants' alternative vision of government, saying:

That of a secret government, directed principally by NSC staffers, accountable to not a single elected official, including apparently the President himself—a shadowy Government with its own Air Force, its own Navy, its own fundraising mechanism, and the ability to pursue its own ideas of the national interest, free from all checks and balances, and free from the law itself.

Criticizing the logic of Marine Lt. Colonel Oliver North's justifications for his actions in the affair, Inouye made reference to the Nuremberg trials, provoking a heated interruption from North's attorney Brendan Sullivan, an exchange that was widely repeated in the media at the time. He was also seen as a pro-Taiwan senator and helped in forming the Taiwan Relations Act.

On May 1, 1977, Inouye stated that President Carter had telephoned him to express his objections to a sentence in the Senate Intelligence Committee's report on the Central Intelligence Agency.

In 1986, West Virginia Senator Robert Byrd opted to run for Senate majority leader, believing that his two opponents to claiming the position would be Inouye and Louisiana Senator J. Bennett Johnston. Cutting a deal with Inouye, Byrd pledged that he would step down from the position in 1989 if Inouye supported him for Senate majority leader of the 100th United States Congress. Inouye accepted the offer, and was given the chance to select the new Senate sergeant-at-arms.

On November 20, 1993, Inouye voted against the North American Free Trade Agreement. The trade agreement linked the United States, Canada, and Mexico into a single free trade zone and was signed into law on December 8 by President Bill Clinton.

In 2009, Inouye assumed leadership of the powerful Senate Committee on Appropriations after longtime chairman Robert Byrd stepped down. Following the latter's death on June 28, 2010, Inouye was elected president pro tempore, the officer third in the presidential line of succession. Inouye was the highest an Asian American had reached in the line of succession until the vice-presidency of Kamala Harris.

In 2010, Inouye announced his decision to run for a ninth term. He easily won the Democratic primary—the real contest in heavily Democratic Hawaii — and then won against Republican state representative Campbell Cavasso with 74 percent of the vote.

Inouye ran for Senate majority leader several times, without success.

Inouye announced that he planned to run for a record tenth term in 2016, when he would have been 92 years old. Inouye also said,

I have told my staff and I have told my family that when the time comes, when you question my sanity or question my ability to do things physically or mentally, I don't want you to hesitate, do everything to get me out of here, because I want to make certain the people of Hawaii get the best representation possible.

At the time of his death in December 2012, Inouye was the second-longest-tenured U.S. senator in history (behind Robert Byrd). He served in the Senate for 49 years.

=== Foreign policy ===
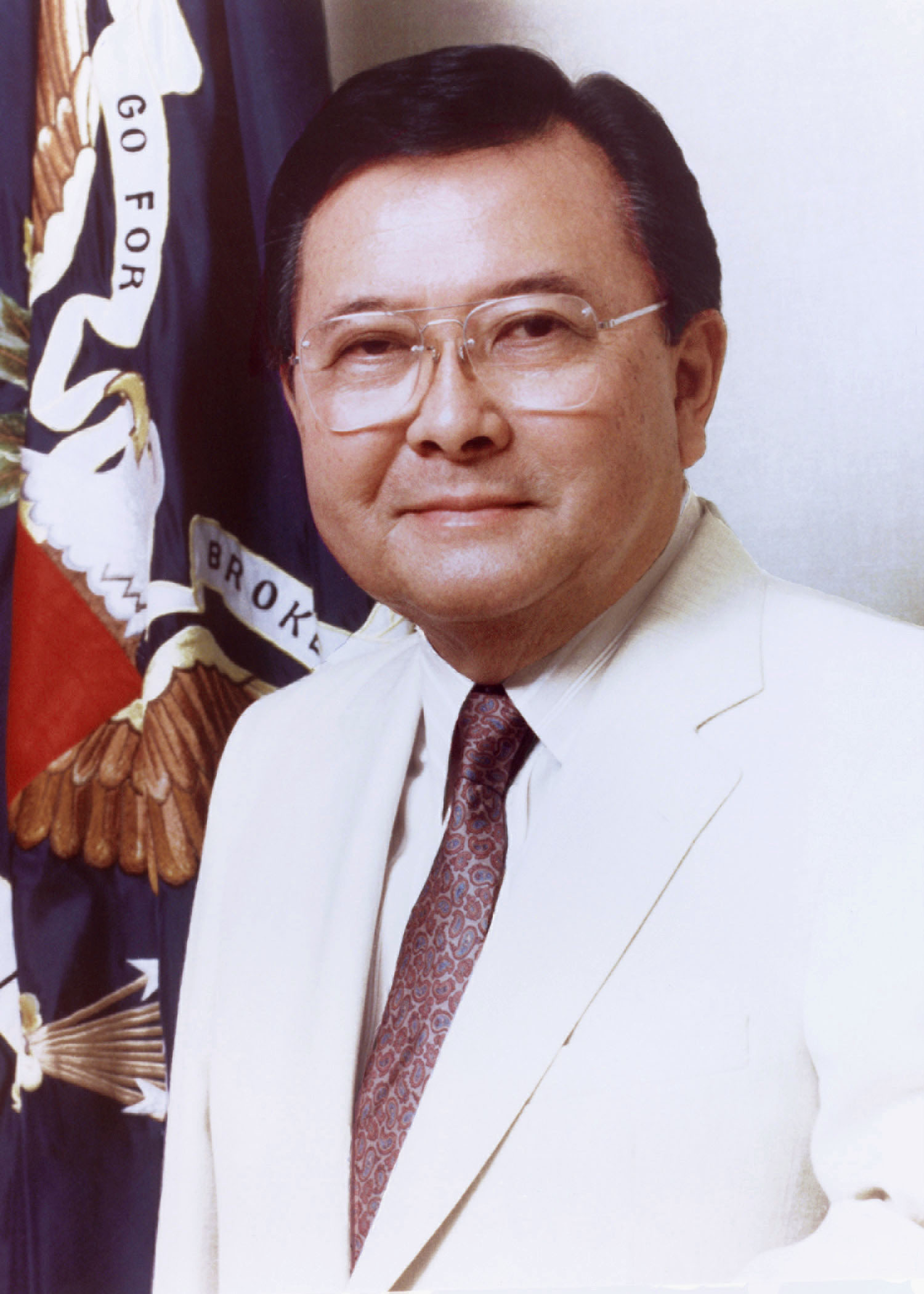
Official portrait, undated

In early 1981, Inouye called for tighter restrictions on what Americans can ship overseas, citing his belief that American international stature would be harmed along with the country's foreign policy interests in the event of the shipments causing environmental damage.

In March 1981, Inouye was one of 24 elected officials to issue a joint statement calling on the Reagan administration to compose a method of finding a peaceful solution that would end The Troubles in Northern Ireland.

In July 1981, a Federal commission began hearings to decide on rewarding compensations to Japanese-Americans placed in internment camps during World War II, Inouye and fellow Hawaii Senator Spark M. Matsunaga delivering opening statements. In November, during an appearance at the opening of a 10-day public forum at Tufts University on Japanese internment, Inouye stated his opposition to distributing reparation fees for Japanese-Americans previously incarcerated during World War II, adding that it "would be insulting even to try to do so." In August 1988, Inouye attended President Reagan's signing of legislation apologizing for the internment camps and establishing a $1.25 billion trust fund to pay reparations to both those who were placed in camps and to their families. In September 1989, during the Senate's debate over bestowing reparations to Japanese-Americans interned during World War II, Inouye delivered his first public speech on the issue and noted $22,000 were bestowed to each captive American in the Iran hostage crisis.

In October 2002, Inouye was one of 23 senators who voted against authorization of the use of military force in Iraq.

=== Domestic policy ===
In March 1982, amid controversy surrounding Democratic Senator Harrison A. Williams' taking bribes in the Abscam sting operation, Inouye delivered a closing defense argument stating the possibility of the Senate looking foolish in the event the conviction was reversed on appeal. Inouye confirmed that he had received telephone calls regarding Williams critiquing his remarks during his defense of himself the previous week and questioned if the Senate was going to punish him "because his presentation was rambling, not in the tradition of Daniel Webster" and for his wife believing in him.

In October 1982, after President Reagan appointed two new members to the board of the Legal Services Corporation, Inouye was one of 32 Senators to sign a letter expressing grave concerns over the appointments.

On December 23, Inouye voted against a five-cent-a-gallon increase in gasoline taxes across the U.S. imposed to aid the financing of highway repairs and mass transit. The bill passed on the last day of the 97th United States Congress.

In March 1984, Inouye voted against a constitutional amendment authorizing periods in public schools for silent prayer and against President Reagan's unsuccessful proposal for a constitutional amendment permitting organized school prayer in public schools. In August, Inouye secured the acceptance of the Senate's defense appropriations subcommittee for an amendment meant to cure mainland milk arriving at Hawaiian and Alaskan military bases sour, arguing thousands of gallons of milk coming from the mainland must be dumped due to their souring and said shipments were arriving eight days after pasteurization.

In February 1989, after Oliver North went on trial in Federal District Court amid accusations that he illegally diverted profits from the secret sale of arms to Iran to the Nicaraguan rebels, Jack Brooks, then-chair of the House Oversight Committee, questioned North's role in composing a "contingency plan in the event of an emergency that would suspend the American Constitution." Inouye replied that the inquiry touched on a classified and sensitive matter that would only be discussed in a closed session.

==== Gang of 14 ====
On May 23, 2005, Inouye was a member of a bipartisan group of 14 moderate senators, known as the Gang of 14, to forge a compromise on the Democrats' use of the judicial filibuster, thus blocking the Republican leadership's attempt to implement the "nuclear option", a means of forcibly ending a filibuster. Under the agreement, the Democrats would retain the power to filibuster a Bush judicial nominee only in an "extraordinary circumstance", and the three most conservative Bush appellate court nominees (Janice Rogers Brown, Priscilla Owen, and William H. Pryor Jr.) would receive a vote by the full U.S. Senate.

== Electoral history ==
Inouye never lost an election. His closest race was in 1992, when state senator Rick Reed held Inouye to 57 percent of the vote; this was the only time he received less than 69 percent of the vote.

== Personal life ==
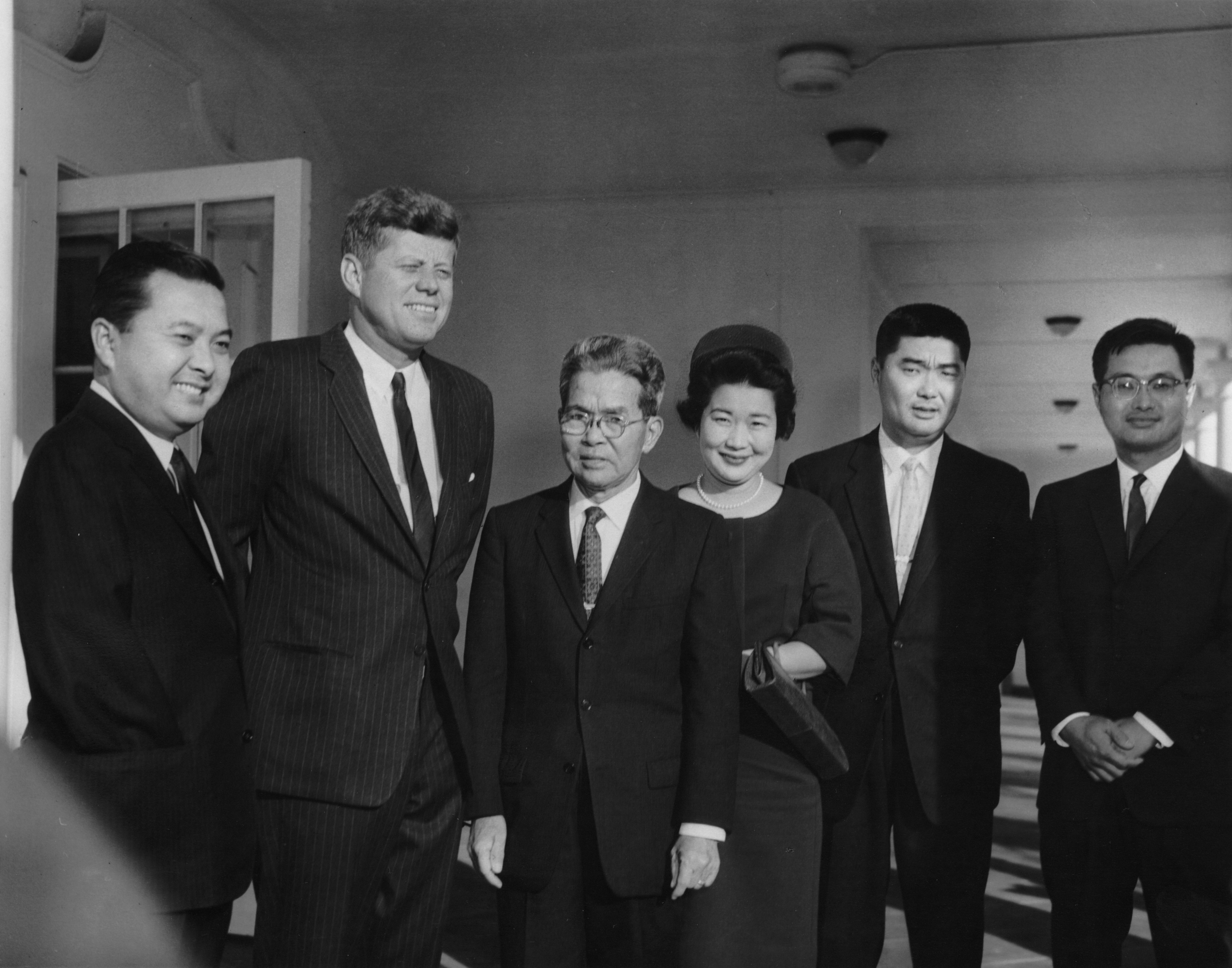
The Inouyes visiting the White House in 1963. From left: Daniel, President Kennedy, Hyotaro (father), Maggie (wife), John, and Robert (brothers).

Inouye's first wife was Margaret "Maggie" Shinobu Awamura, who was working as a speech instructor at the University of Hawaii while Inouye was studying there. The two married on June 12, 1948 at the Harris Memorial Methodist Church in Honolulu and had a son, Ken. Ken Inouye went on to become the guitarist for the hardcore punk band Marginal Man. Maggie Inouye died of cancer on March 13, 2006.

On May 24, 2008, Inouye married Irene Hirano in a private ceremony in Beverly Hills, California. Hirano was president and founding chief executive officer of the Japanese American National Museum in Los Angeles, California. She resigned the position at the time of her marriage in order to be closer to her husband. Inouye was 24 years older than Hirano. On May 27, 2010, Hirano was elected chair of the nation's second-largest non-profit organization, The Ford Foundation. Hirano outlived Inouye by more than seven years; she died on April 7, 2020.

== Alleged sexual misconduct ==
In 1992, Inouye's hairdresser accused Inouye of rape. Inouye denied the accusation. The allegation received national media attention. A Senate ethics committee review was dropped in 1993 over Inouye's accuser's lack of participation.

In 2014, two years after Inouye's death, U.S. Senator Kirsten Gillibrand wrote in her autobiography about a male colleague who squeezed her waist and commented: "Don't lose too much weight now. I like my girls chubby!" The New York Times identified Inouye as the senator referred to by Gillibrand, setting off national discussion of Inouye's past.

In 2017, another woman alleged that Inouye had sexually harassed her. A former staffer, the woman alleged that Inouye asked her to rub his shoulders, tried to put his hand on her leg, grabbed her hand, invited her to a late dinner in his room, requested she sit next to him on a bed, and tried to place his hand under her skirt. The woman asked to remain anonymous.

Hawaii State Rep. Kaniela Ing, who learned about the 1992 accusations through a PBS television program, questioned the 2016 decision to rename the Honolulu International Airport after Inouye.

== Honors ==
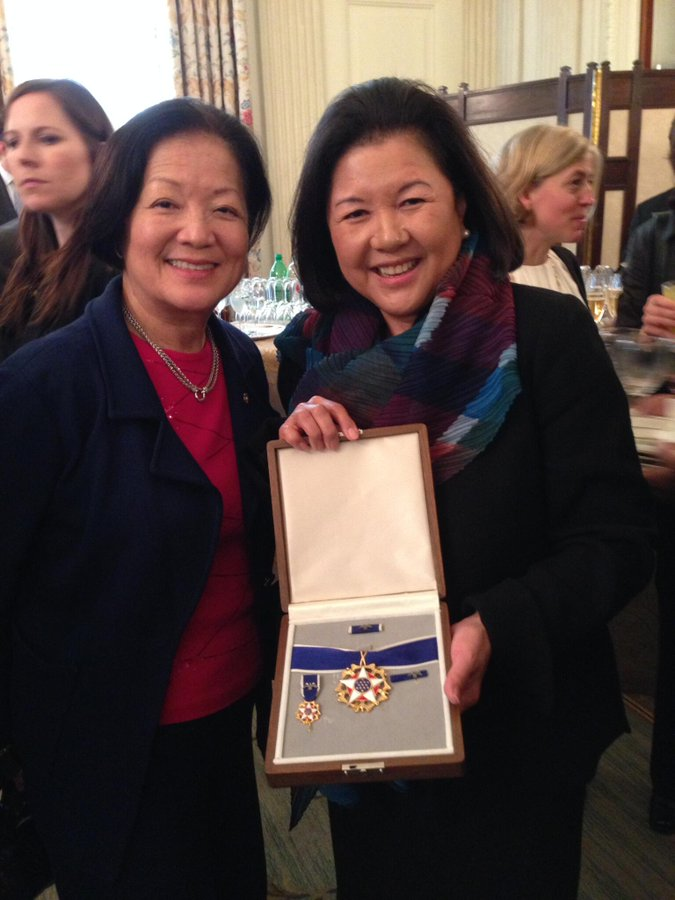
Irene Hirano Inouye, with Senator Mazie Hirono, after being presented with Inouye's posthumous Presidential Medal of Freedom in 2013

- Golden Plate Award of the American Academy of Achievement in 1968.
- Grand Cross of the Philippine Legion of Honor in 1993.
- On June 21, 2000, Inouye was presented the Medal of Honor by President Bill Clinton for his service during World War II.
- In 2000, Inouye was awarded the Grand Cordon of the Order of the Rising Sun by the Emperor of Japan in recognition of his long and distinguished career in public service.
- In 2006, the U.S. Navy Memorial awarded Inouye its Naval Heritage award for his support of the U.S. Navy and the military during his terms in the Senate.
- Grand Cross (Bayani) of the Order of Lakandula on August 14, 2006.
- In 2007, Inouye was personally inducted as a Chevalier of the Legion of Honor by President of France Nicolas Sarkozy.
- In February 2009, a bill was introduced in the Philippine House of Representatives by Rep. Antonio Diaz seeking to confer honorary Filipino citizenship on Inouye, Senators Ted Stevens and Daniel Akaka, and Representative Bob Filner for their role in securing the passage of benefits for Filipino World War II veterans.
- In June 2011, Inouye was appointed a Grand Cordon of the Order of the Paulownia Flowers, the highest Japanese honor which may be conferred upon a foreigner who is not a head of state. Only the seventh American to be so honored, he is also the first American of Japanese descent to receive it. The conferment of the order was "to recognize his continued significant and unprecedented contributions to the enhancement of goodwill and understanding between Japan and the United States."
- In 2011, Philippine president Benigno Aquino III conferred Order of Sikatuna upon Inouye. He had previously been awarded Order of Lakandula and a Philippine Republic Presidential Unit Citation.
- Inouye was inducted as an honorary member of the Navajo Nation and titled "The Leader Who Has Returned With a Plan".
- On August 8, 2013, Inouye was posthumously awarded the Presidential Medal of Freedom by President Barack Obama. The citation in the press release reads as follows:

Daniel Inouye was a lifelong public servant. As a young man, he fought in World War II with the 442nd Regimental Combat Team, for which he received the Medal of Honor. He was later elected to the Hawaii Territorial House of Representatives, the United States House of Representatives, and the United States Senate. Senator Inouye was the first Japanese American to serve in Congress, representing the people of Hawaii from the moment they joined the Union.

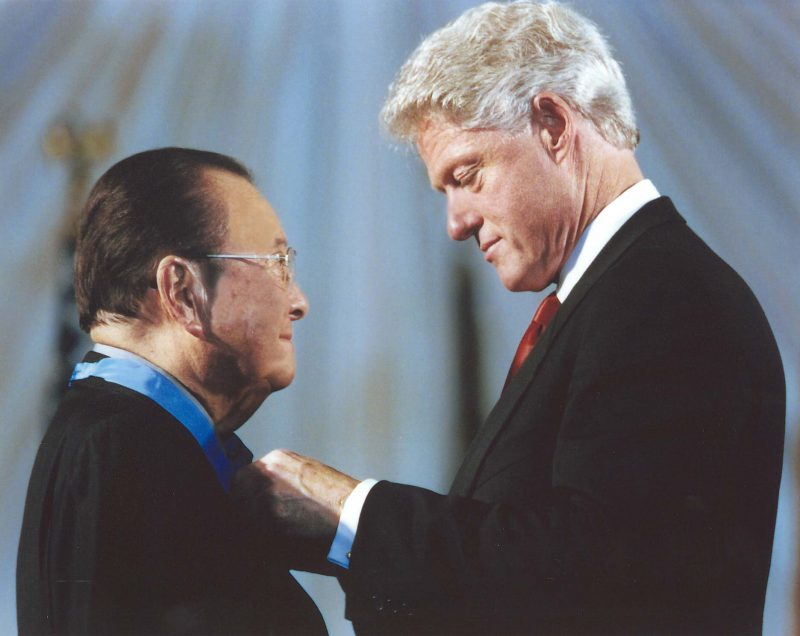
President Bill Clinton presenting the Medal of Honor to Senator Inouye in 2000

== Awards and decorations ==
On May 27, 1947, Inouye was honorably discharged and returned home as a Captain with a Distinguished Service Cross, Bronze Star Medal, two Purple Hearts, and 12 other medals and citations. In 2000, his Distinguished Service Cross was upgraded to the Medal of Honor.

Badge	Combat Infantryman Badge		
1st row	Medal of Honor Upgraded from Distinguished Service Cross in 2000		
2nd row	Bronze Star Medal	Purple Heart with 1 Oak leaf cluster	Presidential Medal of Freedom
3rd row	Army Good Conduct Medal	American Campaign Medal	Asiatic-Pacific Campaign Medal
4th row	European–African–Middle Eastern Campaign Medal with 4 Campaign stars	World War II Victory Medal	Army of Occupation Medal
Unit awards	Presidential Unit Citation		Philippine Presidential Unit Citation

Foreign Awards

Order of Lakandula Grand Cross
Order of Sikatuna; Grand Cross	Legion of Honor; Chief Commander	Order of the Paulownia Flowers Grand Cordon
Order of the Rising Sun Grand Cordon	Légion d'honneur Chevalier	Chief of Staff Medal of Appreciation

== Death ==
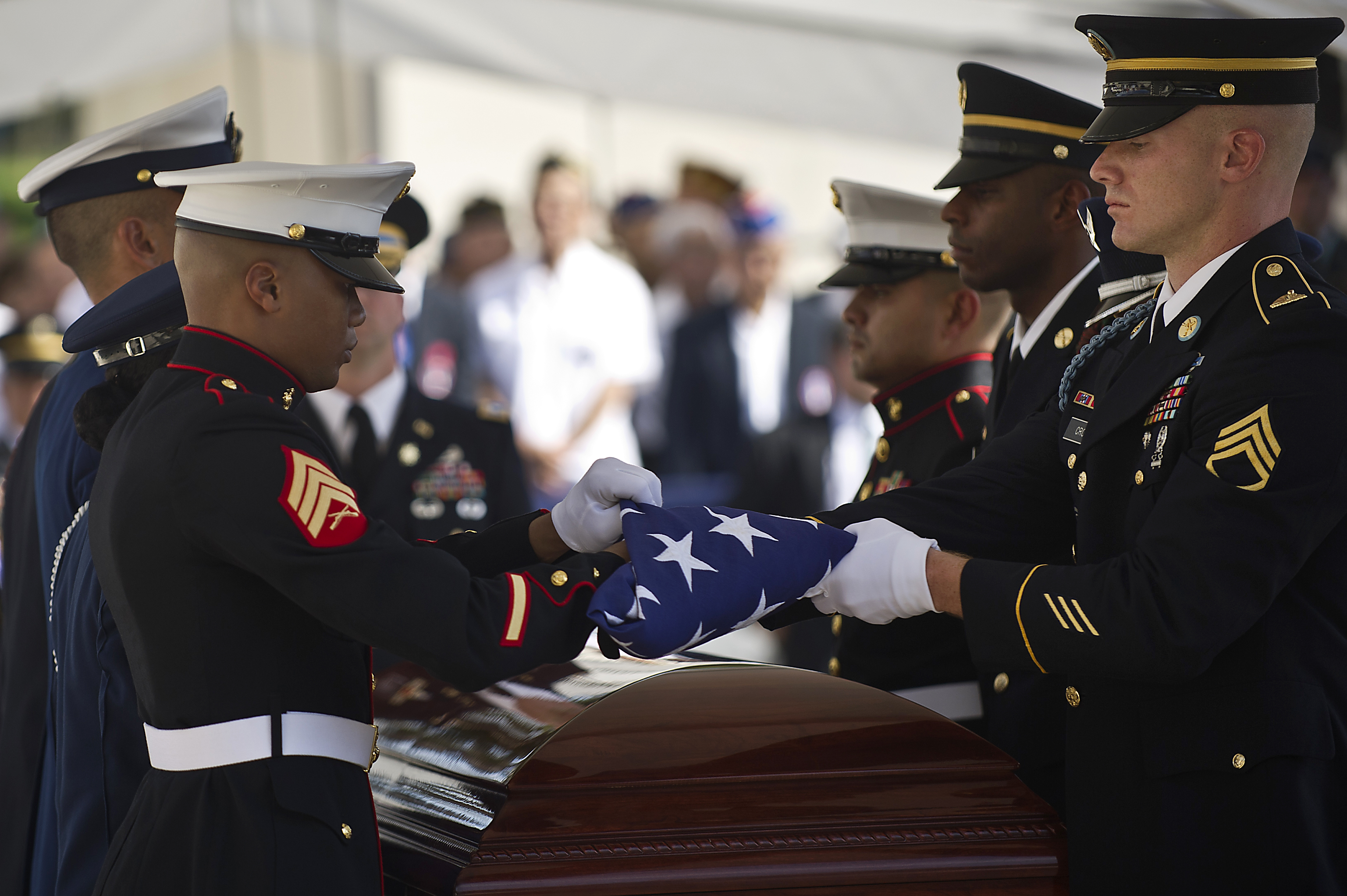
A joint military honor guard folds a U.S. flag over Inouye's casket at the National Memorial Cemetery.

After experiencing health and mobility problems in 2012, Inouye was hospitalized at George Washington University Hospital on December 6, 2012 so doctors could regulate his oxygen intake. He was transferred to Walter Reed Medical Center four days later and died there of respiratory complications on December 17, 2012. According to the senator's Congressional website, his last word was "Aloha."

Senate Majority Leader Harry Reid announced Inouye's death on the floor of the Senate, referring to Inouye as "certainly one of the giants of the Senate." Senate Minority Leader Mitch McConnell referred to Inouye as one of the finest Senators in United States history. Sen. Daniel Akaka of Hawaii called Inouye "'the man who changed the islands forever'" and "'a true patriot and an American hero in every sense'". President Barack Obama referred to him as a "true American hero".

Inouye's body lay in state at the United States Capitol rotunda on December 20, 2012. President Obama, former president Bill Clinton, Vice President Joe Biden, House speaker John Boehner and Senate Majority Leader Harry Reid spoke at a funeral service at the Washington National Cathedral the following day. Inouye's body was then flown to Hawaii where it lay in state at the Hawaii State Capitol on December 22. A second funeral service was held at the National Memorial Cemetery of the Pacific in Honolulu the following day.

== Legacy ==
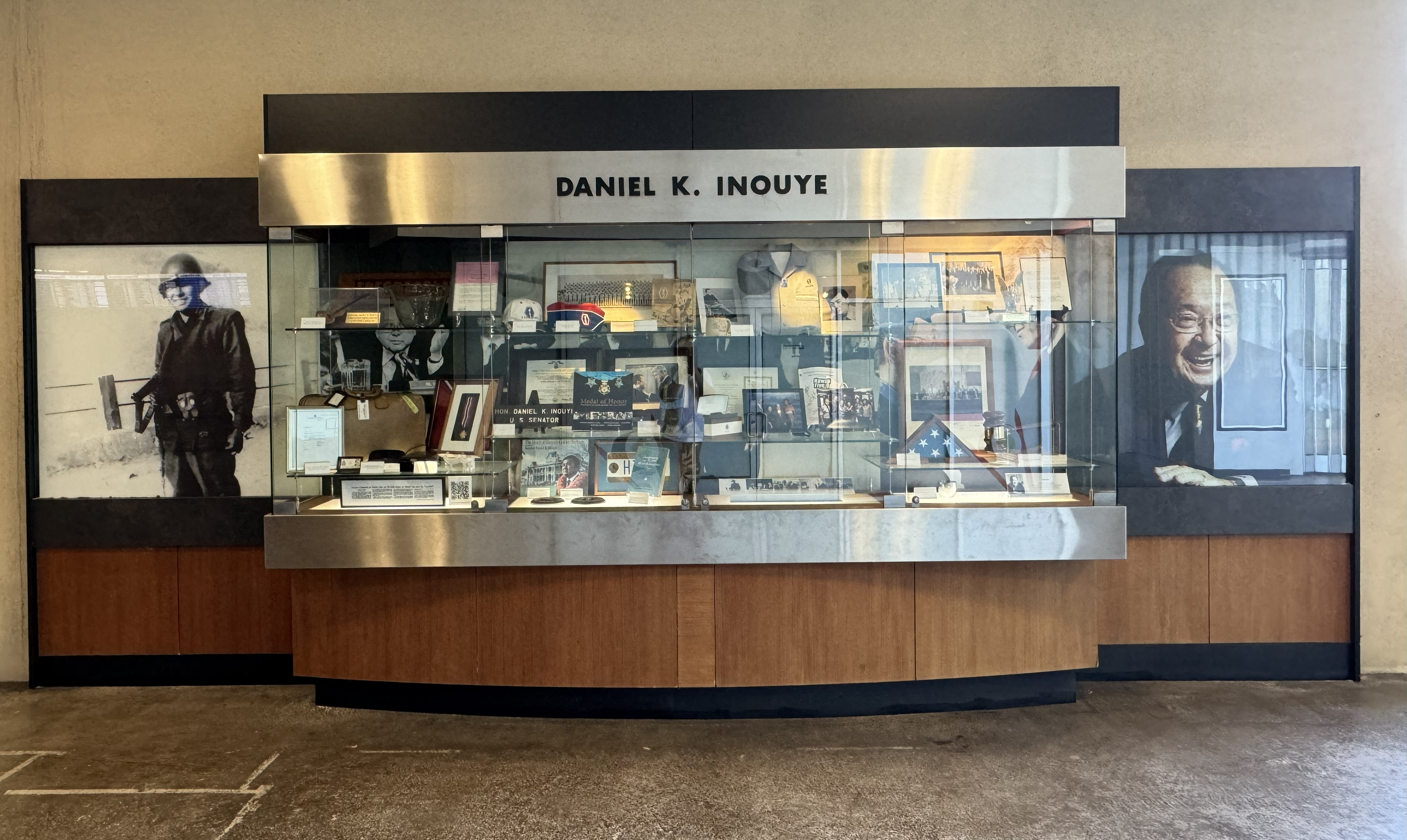
Exhibit on Inouye at Daniel K. Inouye International Airport

The Daniel K. Inouye Graduate School of Nursing, founded in 1993, became part of the Uniformed Services University of the Health Sciences.

Inouye made a cameo appearance as himself in the 1994 film The Next Karate Kid, giving the opening speech at Arlington National Cemetery for a commendation for Japanese-Americans who fought in the 442nd Regimental Combat Team during World War II.

In 2001, the Forest Glen Annex at Fort Detrick in Silver Spring, Maryland dedicated building 503 as the Daniel K. Inouye Building, built to house the Walter Reed Army Institute of Research (WRAIR) and the Naval Medical Research Center (NMRC).

In 2007, The Citadel dedicated Inouye Hall at the Citadel/South Carolina Army National Guard Marksmanship Center to Senator Inouye, who helped make the center possible.

In May 2013, Secretary of the Navy Ray Mabus announced that the next Arleigh Burke-class destroyer would be named the USS Daniel Inouye (DDG-118). The destroyer was officially christened at Bath Iron Works on June 22, 2019.

In November 2013, the National Asian Pacific American Bar Association renamed its Trailblazer Award in honor of Inouye, posthumously honoring him with the Senator Daniel K. Inouye NAPABA Trailblazer Award.

In December 2013, the Advanced Technology Solar Telescope at Haleakala Observatory on Maui was renamed the Daniel K. Inouye Solar Telescope.

Numerous federal properties at Joint Base Pearl Harbor–Hickam and around Hawai'i have been dedicated to Senator Inouye, including the National Oceanic and Atmospheric Administration Daniel K. Inouye Regional Center (2013), the Hawaii Air National Guard Daniel K. Inouye Fighter Squadron Operations & Aircraft Maintenance Facility (2014), the Senator Daniel K. Inouye Defense POW/MIA Accounting Agency building (2015), the Daniel K. Inouye Asia-Pacific Center for Security Studies at Fort Derussy (2015), and the Pacific Missile Range Facility Daniel K. Inouye Range and Operations Center on Kauai (2016).

In 2014, Israel named the simulator room of the Arrow anti-missile defense system in his honor, the first time that a military facility has been named after a foreign national.

A Boeing C-17 Globemaster III, tail number 5147, of the 535th Airlift Squadron, was dedicated Spirit of Daniel Inouye on August 20, 2014.

The Parade Field at Fort Benning, Georgia was rededicated to honor Senator Inouye on September 12, 2014.

On April 27, 2017, Honolulu's airport was renamed Daniel K. Inouye International Airport in his honor.

In 2018, Honolulu-based Matson, Inc. named its newest container ship, the largest built in the United States, the Daniel K. Inouye.

The University of Hawaiʻi at Hilo dedicated its pharmacy college the Daniel K. Inouye College of Pharmacy (DKICP) on December 4, 2019.

In August 2021, while visiting Japan for the Tokyo Olympics, First Lady Jill Biden dedicated a room in the U.S. ambassador's residence to Inouye and his wife, Irene.

== See also ==
- List of Asian American Medal of Honor recipients for World War II
- List of Asian Americans in the United States Congress
- List of members of the United States Congress who died in office (2000–present)#2010s

== Bibliography ==
- Slavicek, Louise Chipley (2007). Daniel Inouye. New York: Chelsea House. ISBN 978-0-7910-9271-2. OCLC 71004145.

U.S. House of Representatives
Preceded by John A. Burns as U.S. Delegate	Member of the U.S. House of Representatives from Hawaii's at-large congressional district 1959–1963	Succeeded by Thomas Gill
Party political offices
Preceded by Oren E. Long	Democratic nominee for U.S. Senator from Hawaii (Class 3); 1962, 1968, 1974, 1980, 1986, 1992, 1998, 2004, 2010	Succeeded by Brian Schatz
Preceded by John O. Pastore	Keynote Speaker of the Democratic National Convention; 1968	Succeeded by Reubin Askew
Preceded by Edmund Muskie	Chair of the Democratic Senatorial Campaign Committee; 1969–1971	Succeeded by Fritz Hollings
Preceded by Ted Moss	Secretary of the Senate Democratic Conference; 1977–1989	Succeeded by David Pryor
Preceded by George Mitchell as Senate Democratic Leader	Chair of the Senate Democratic Steering Committee; 1989–1995	Succeeded by John Kerry
U.S. Senate
Preceded by Oren Long	United States Senator (Class 3) from Hawaii; 1963–2012; Served alongside: Hiram Fong, Spark Matsunaga, Daniel Akaka	Succeeded by Brian Schatz
Preceded by Frank Church as Chair of the Church Committee	Chair of the Senate Intelligence Committee; 1976–1978	Succeeded by Birch Bayh
Preceded by Mark Andrews	Chair of the Senate Indian Affairs Committee; 1987–1995	Succeeded by John McCain
New office	Chair of the Senate Iran-Contra Committee; 1987	Position abolished
Preceded by John Melcher	Ranking Member of the Senate Indian Affairs Committee; 1995–2001	Succeeded by Ben Campbell
Preceded by Ben Campbell	Chair of the Senate Indian Affairs Committee; 2001–2003	Succeeded by Ben Campbell
Preceded by Ben Campbell	Ranking Member of the Senate Indian Affairs Committee; 2003–2005	Succeeded by Byron Dorgan
Preceded by Fritz Hollings	Ranking Member of the Senate Commerce Committee; 2005–2007	Succeeded by Ted Stevens
Preceded by Ted Stevens	Chair of the Senate Commerce Committee; 2007–2009	Succeeded by Jay Rockefeller
Preceded by Robert Byrd	Chair of the Senate Appropriations Committee; 2009–2012	Succeeded by Barbara Mikulski
Political offices
Preceded by Robert Byrd	President pro tempore of the U.S. Senate; 2010–2012	Succeeded by Patrick Leahy
Honorary titles
Preceded by Robert Byrd	Dean of the Senate; 2010–2012	Succeeded by Patrick Leahy
Preceded by Robert Byrd	Most senior Democratic senator 2010–2012	Succeeded by Patrick Leahy
Preceded by Gerald Ford	Persons who have lain in state or honor in the United States Capitol rotunda December 20, 2012	Succeeded by Billy Graham
Preceded by Robert Byrd	Most senior living U.S. senator (Sitting or former); 2010–2012	Succeeded by Birch Bayh
