= Irene Hirano =

American business executive (1948–2020)

Irene Hirano Inouye
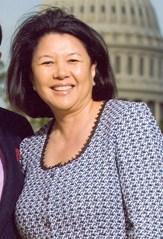
- Hirano in 2009
- Born: Irene Ann Yasutake; October 7, 1948; Los Angeles, California, U.S.
- Died: April 7, 2020 (aged 71); Los Angeles, California, U.S.
- Spouse: Daniel Inouye (m. 2008; died 2012)
- Children: 1

Irene Hirano Inouye (née Yasutake; October 7, 1948 – April 7, 2020) was an American business executive who was the founding President of the U.S.-Japan Council, a position she held ever since she helped create the organization in 2009 until her death. Hirano Inouye focused on building positive relations between the United States and Japan, and was also a leader in philanthropy, community engagement, and advancing social causes. She served on a number of prominent non-profit boards and was chair of the Ford Foundation's board of trustees. She previously served as president and founding chief executive officer of the Japanese American National Museum in Los Angeles from 1988 to 2008, which is affiliated with the Smithsonian Institution.

== Career ==
=== Early non-profit career ===
Hirano dedicated her professional life to non-profit work supporting a number of important communities. She started her work in the field of public administration as the Executive Director of the T.H.E. Clinic, a non-profit community health facility for low and moderate income women and families. She worked at the clinic for thirteen years, during which time she discovered that there was a need for the public to understand the differences in the needs of people based on gender and cultural backgrounds.

=== Museum leadership and arts engagement ===
In 1988, Hirano became the director and president of the Japanese American National Museum. The Japanese American National Museum is the first museum in the United States dedicated to sharing the experience of Americans of Japanese ancestry as an integral part of U.S. history. Since the opening of its historic site in 1992, the museum has continued to fulfill its mission through historical exhibitions, and through partnerships with other communities and museums. It has been at the forefront of preserving, researching and educating about the internment experience during World War II, as well as related issues such as Japanese American military service in World War II, redress, and broader civil rights. The National Museum opened its 85,000 square-foot Pavilion to the public in January 1999.

In 1994, she was appointed by President Clinton to the Committee on the Arts and Humanities.

=== Strengthening U.S.-Japan relations ===
Hirano Inouye served as President of the U.S.-Japan Council, which is headquartered in Washington, D.C., with offices in Los Angeles and Tokyo. The U.S.-Japan Council was established in 2009 as an organization dedicated to building people-to-people relationships between the two countries.

Hirano Inouye created the Council with other Japanese American leaders to provide opportunities for Japanese Americans to reconnect to Japan. She saw the importance of connecting Japanese American communities and younger Nikkei generations to the land of their ancestry as an important way to strengthen U.S.-Japan relations. Having led U.S. delegations to Japan under the Japanese Government's Japanese American Leadership Delegation for several years, she recognized the untapped potential within the Japanese American community to actively support people-to-people connections that were the foundation of the bilateral relationship. She saw that although many Japanese Americans had been addressing U.S.-Japan relations in their various professions, the time had come to create an organization of leaders who are dedicated to working on U.S.-Japan relations. As such, she brought together leaders from all different fields who are either working in or committed to building that relationship. There are many Japanese Americans in very high positions in various sectors. The Council's role is to connect them with each other, with their counterparts in Japan, and with other diverse leaders with the same mission and vision.

The Council has grown in size and expanded its activities to include diverse participants, and signature programs such as the Japanese American Leadership Delegation, the Asian American Leadership Delegation, the Emerging Leaders Program, and well-attended Annual Conferences that gather government, business, and civil society leaders from both countries.

Since 2011, the U.S.-Japan Council has administered the TOMODACHI Initiative in partnership with the U.S. Embassy in Tokyo. The initiative is a public-private partnership with the U.S. Embassy in Tokyo, and enjoys the strong support of the Government of Japan and it invests in the next generation of leaders in U.S.-Japan relations. The Initiative represents a path-breaking paradigm in U.S. public diplomacy, in which government joins forces with private enterprises and organizations to achieve mutually beneficial, strategic goals. TOMODACHI provides young Japanese and Americans with opportunities to study, live, and work in each other's countries, thereby ensuring a thriving bilateral partnership into the foreseeable future. TOMODACHI has raised over $45 million, supported over 35,000 participants in activities, with over 5,000 program alumni (as of late 2016).

=== Non-profit board leadership and service ===
Her professional and community activities included serving as the Immediate Past Chair of the Board of Directors to the Ford Foundation, where she continued as a Trustee. She was the immediate past Chair of The Kresge Foundation and served as a Trustee. She also was a member of the Boards of Trustees of the Independent Sector and The Washington Center. She was an advisor to the Daniel K. Inouye Institute.

Hirano Inouye's previous community service included Chair and Member of the Board of Directors of the American Association of Museums, Member of the Accreditation Commission American Association of Museums, Member, Board of Trustees, National Trust for Historic Preservation, Member, Board of Trustees, National Children's Museum, Presidential Appointee to the President's Committee on the Arts & Humanities, Smithsonian Institution National Board and Board of the National Museum of American History, Chair and Member of the Los Angeles Convention and Visitors Bureau Board, Chair and Member California Commission on the Status of Women, and member of the Toyota Corporation Diversity Advisory Board and Sodexho Corporation Business Advisory Board.

In 2016, the Center on Philanthropy and Public Policy at USC launched a fund to support research and programs to explore foundation leadership as it solves society's most pressing problems, in honor of Irene Hirano Inouye. In announcing the launch, she was recognized for her leadership. "Irene exemplifies what bold and thoughtful philanthropic leadership should look like," said Darren Walker, president of the Ford Foundation. "She understands the dynamic interplay between board members and their executives, discovering how and when to take calculated risks. She also understands the important role organizational culture plays in a foundation's ability to deliver on its promises."

=== Commitment to women's empowerment ===
The governor of California selected Hirano in 1976 to become the chair of the California Commission on the Status of Women. She worked throughout the state and found that often, "Asian American women were invisible." On the state commission, she worked with future BART director Carole Ward Allen and Hannah-Beth Jackson who would become a member of the California state legislature.

In 1980, she helped organize the Asian Women's Network in Los Angeles and served as its first president. She has remained involved in a number of activities to promote women's empowerment within the Asian American community, as well as more broadly in both the United States and Japan. In 2013 and 2014, she helped launch the Women in Business Summit in Tokyo, Japan (co-sponsored with the American Chamber of Commerce of Japan). In 2014 and 2016, she represented the United States in Japan's international symposium, World Assembly for Women (WAW!).

=== Awards and recognition ===
Among the awards Hirano Inouye received for her work included ones from the Anti-Defamation League, the League of Women Voters, the National Education Association, the University of Southern California Alumni Association, the Liberty Hill Foundation, the Arab American National Museum, the Asian American Federation, the Asian Justice Center, and the Leadership Education for Asian Pacifics.

Additional recognition included the 2012 Japan Foundation Award; Honorary Doctorate degree in 2015 from Southern Methodist University; and the Japan Chamber of Commerce and Industry of New York's 2016 Eagle on the World Award.

Additionally, in 2016, Forbes Japan included Hirano Inouye in its list of 55 Women Leaders of Japan.

In August 2021, while visiting Japan for the Tokyo Olympics, First lady Jill Biden dedicated a room in the U.S. ambassador’s residence to Irene and her husband, the late U.S. Sen. Daniel K. Inouye. In October 2021, Hirano Inouye was posthumously awarded Japan's Order of the Rising Sun, Gold Rays with Neck Ribbon.

== Personal life and death ==
Hirano was a sansei, which means she was a third-generation Japanese American, born on October 7, 1948, in Los Angeles. Her grandparents on her father's side came from Fukuoka, and her mother was born in Japan. Hirano was one of only three women in the University of Southern California's (USC) Public Administration Program at the time; she received her Bachelor of Science in Public Administration in 1970. Her sister, Patti Yasutake, was an actor known for playing Nurse Ogawa on Star Trek: The Next Generation.

Hirano married United States Senator Daniel Inouye on May 24, 2008, in Beverly Hills, California. Hirano's daughter, Jennifer, served as her Maid of Honor. After being widowed in December 2012, Hirano Inouye was active in advancing many of her late husband's causes.

Hirano Inouye died in Los Angeles on April 7, 2020, at age 71, from leiomyosarcoma.

== Addition sources ==
- Moore, Nancy (1995). "Irene Yasutake Hirano". In Zia, Helen; Gall, Susan B. (eds.). Notable Asian Americans. Gale Research, Inc. ISBN 9780810396234.
