= National Press Monument =

Coordinates: 7°33′54.15″S 110°49′5.27″E

- Monumen Pers Nasional
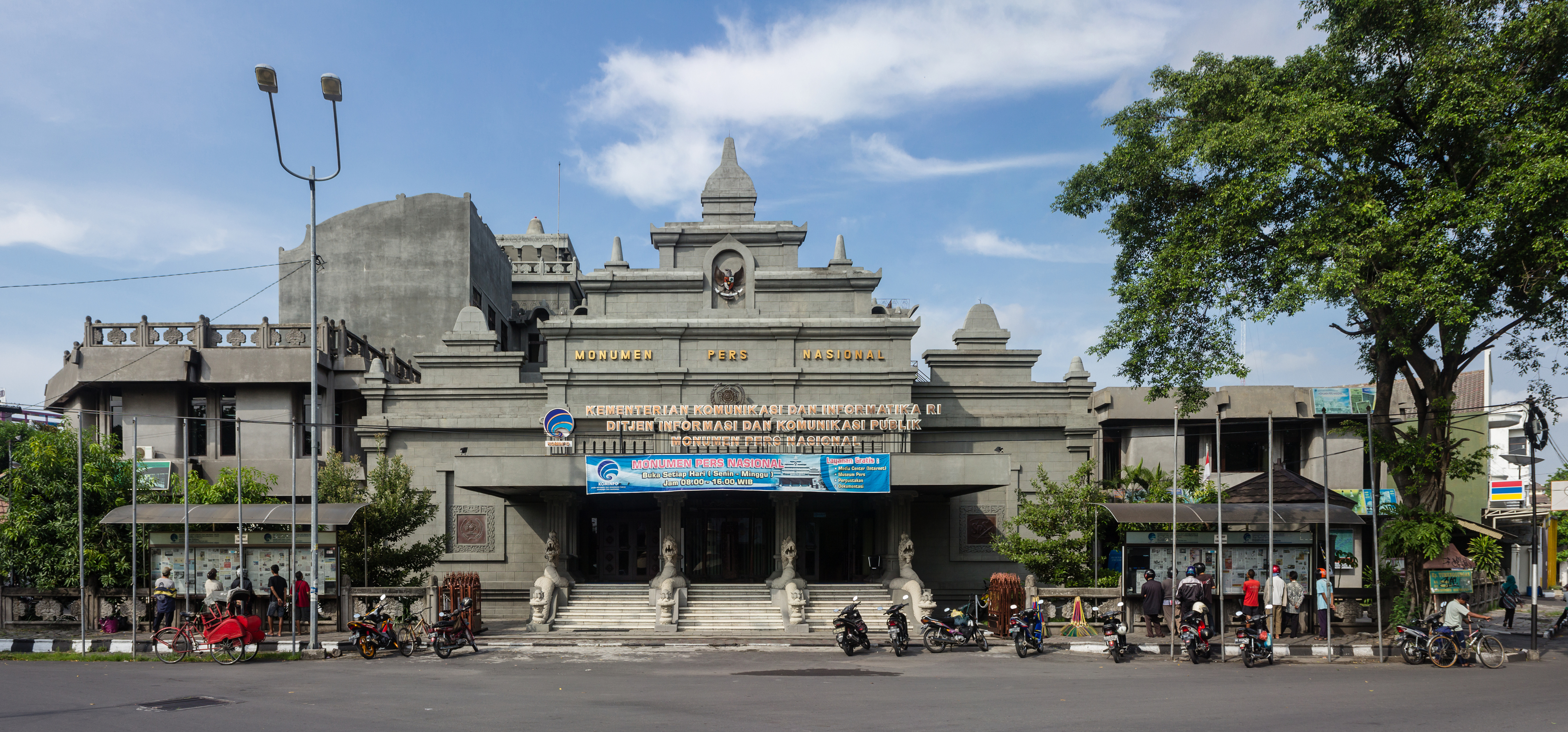
- Established: 9 February 1978
- Location: Surakarta, Central Java
- Type: Press museum
- Website: mpn.kominfo.go.id

The National Press Monument (Indonesian: Monumen Pers Nasional) is a monument and museum to the national Indonesian press. Formally established in 1978, more than 20 years after it was first proposed, the monument is located in Surakarta, Central Java, and operated by the Ministry of Communications and Informatics. The complex consists of an old society building, which was constructed in 1918 and used for the first meeting of the Indonesian Journalists Association (Persatuan Wartawan Indonesia, or PWI), as well as several subsequent expansions; it is listed as a cultural property of Indonesia.

The National Press Monument has a collection of over a million newspapers and magazines, as well as a variety of exhibitions and artefacts related to the history of the press in Indonesia. Facilities include a multimedia room, free-to-read newspapers, and a library. It is promoted as a site for educational tourism through various exhibitions and Facebook, and in 2013 it was visited by over 26,000 people.

== History ==
The building in which the National Press Monument is now housed was constructed in 1918 under the orders of Mangkunegara VII, Prince of Mangkunegaran Palace, as a society building and meeting hall. It was known as Sociëteit "Sasana Soeka" and designed by Mas Abu Kasan Atmodirono. In 1933 R.M. Sarsito Mangunkusumo and several other engineers met in the building and formed the basis of the Soloche Radio Vereeniging (SRV), the first public radio operated by native Indonesians. Thirteen years later, on 9 February 1946, the PWI was formed in the building; the date is commemorated in Indonesia as National Press Day. During the Japanese occupation of the Dutch East Indies, the building housed a clinic to treat troops, and during the Indonesian National Revolution it was used as an office of the Indonesian Red Cross Society.

On 9 February 1956, during an event celebrating ten years of the PWI, high-profile reporters such as Rosihan Anwar, B.M. Diah, and S. Tahsin suggested that a foundation be established which could manage a national press museum. This foundation was formalised on 22 May 1956, with its collection mostly being donated by Soedarjo Tjokrosisworo. Only some fifteen years later did the foundation begin plans for establishing a physical museum, which were formally announced by Minister of Information Budiarjo on 9 February 1971. The name "National Press Monument" was formalised in 1973, and in 1977 the land was donated to the government. The museum was formally opened on 9 February 1978, after several new buildings were added. In his dedication speech, President Suharto warned the press about the dangers of freedom, stating "exercising freedom for freedom's sake is a luxury we cannot afford".

In 2012 the museum was headed by Sujatmiko. That year David Kristian Budhiyanto of Petra Christian University wrote that the museum was rarely visited and in some places poorly maintained. He posited this to be based on a popular view of museums as unexciting or boring places. In order to attract new visitors, the museum has initiated several competitions in 2012 and 2013, including a photography contest on the museum's Facebook page. It has also undertaken mobile exhibitions, showing some of its collection in cities such as Yogyakarta and Magelang. Between January and September 2013 the museum received 26,249 visitors, an increase of 250 per cent over the previous year's target; this was credited to the various promotional efforts undertaken. The museum is now promoted as a site for educational tourism and accepts donations of materials related to the press in Indonesia.

== Description ==
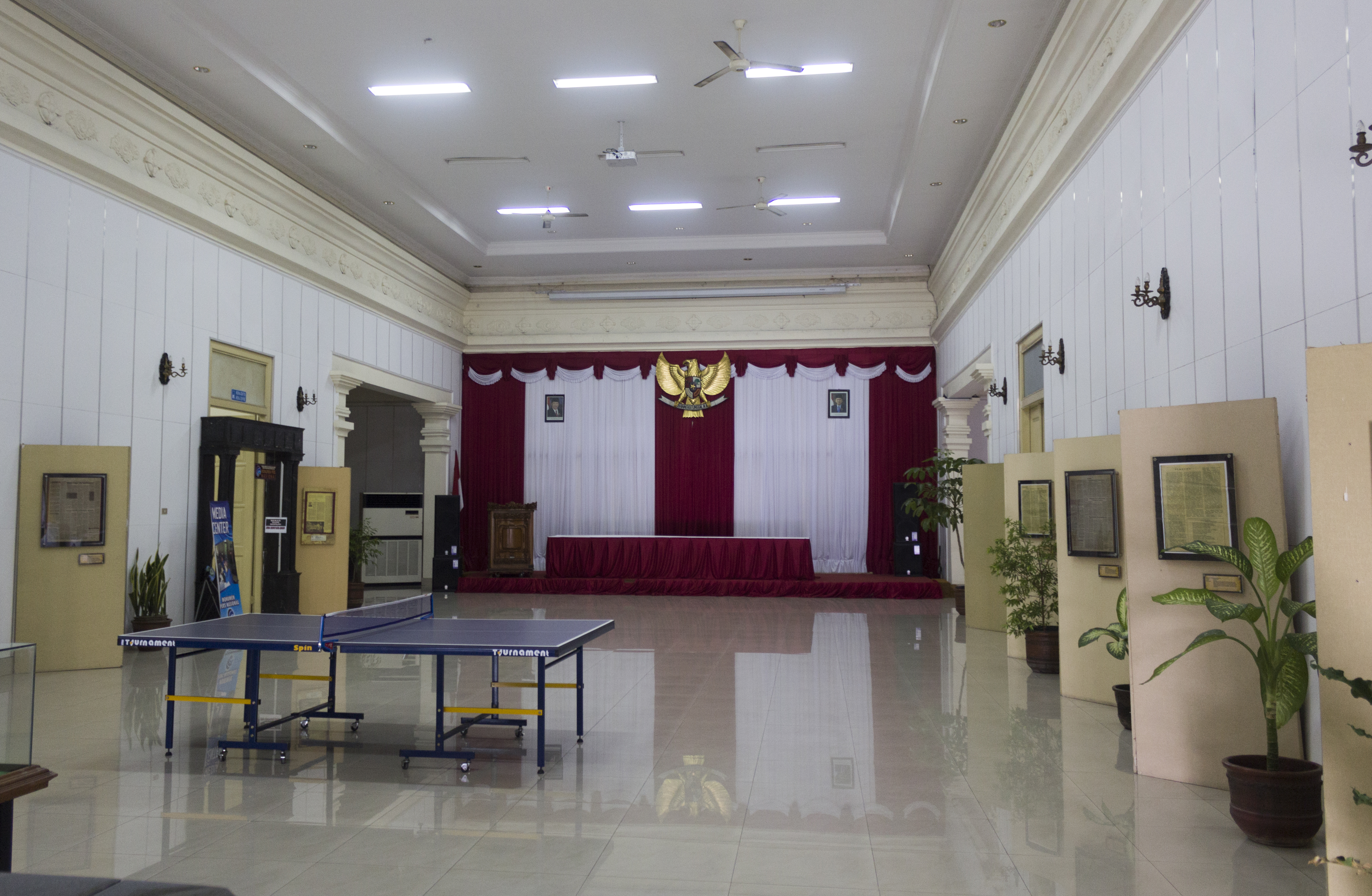
Entrance to the main hall

The National Press Monument is located at 59 Gajah Mada Street in Surakarta, Central Java, at the corner of Gajah Mada and Yosodipuro Streets. It is west of Mangkunegaran Palace. The complex consists of the original Sasana Soeka building, two two-story buildings, as well as a four-story building; these additions were constructed much later. At the front of the museum is a parking area and two public boards where the latest editions of local newspapers (as of 2013, Solopos, Suara Merdeka, and Republika) can be read freely. The front façade is decorated with a naga design symbolising the year 1980, the year in which construction was completed.

Management of the museum is handled by the Ministry of Communications and Informatics. The administrative structure consists of the museum head and administrative manager, as well as divisions for customer service, conservation and preservation, and day-to-day activities. As of 2013, the museum employs 24 civil servants. The building is listed as a Cultural Property of Indonesia.

The museum includes a media centre, where the general public can access the internet without charge on one of nine computers; a library, with a collection of approximately 12,000 books; and a room in which digitalised copies of old newspapers and magazines can be read. Digitalisation of this media is completed on-site. A microfilm room is available, though it is no longer used.

The National Press Monument regularly conducts seminars regarding the press, media, and communications. It holds themed exhibitions of media based on national holidays, including Independence Day, the anniversary of the Youth Pledge, and National Press Day; the museum may also take some of its collection on a mobile exhibition. The digital collection and library is accessible to the general public, while researchers may access paper copies of the newspapers and magazines.

== Holdings ==
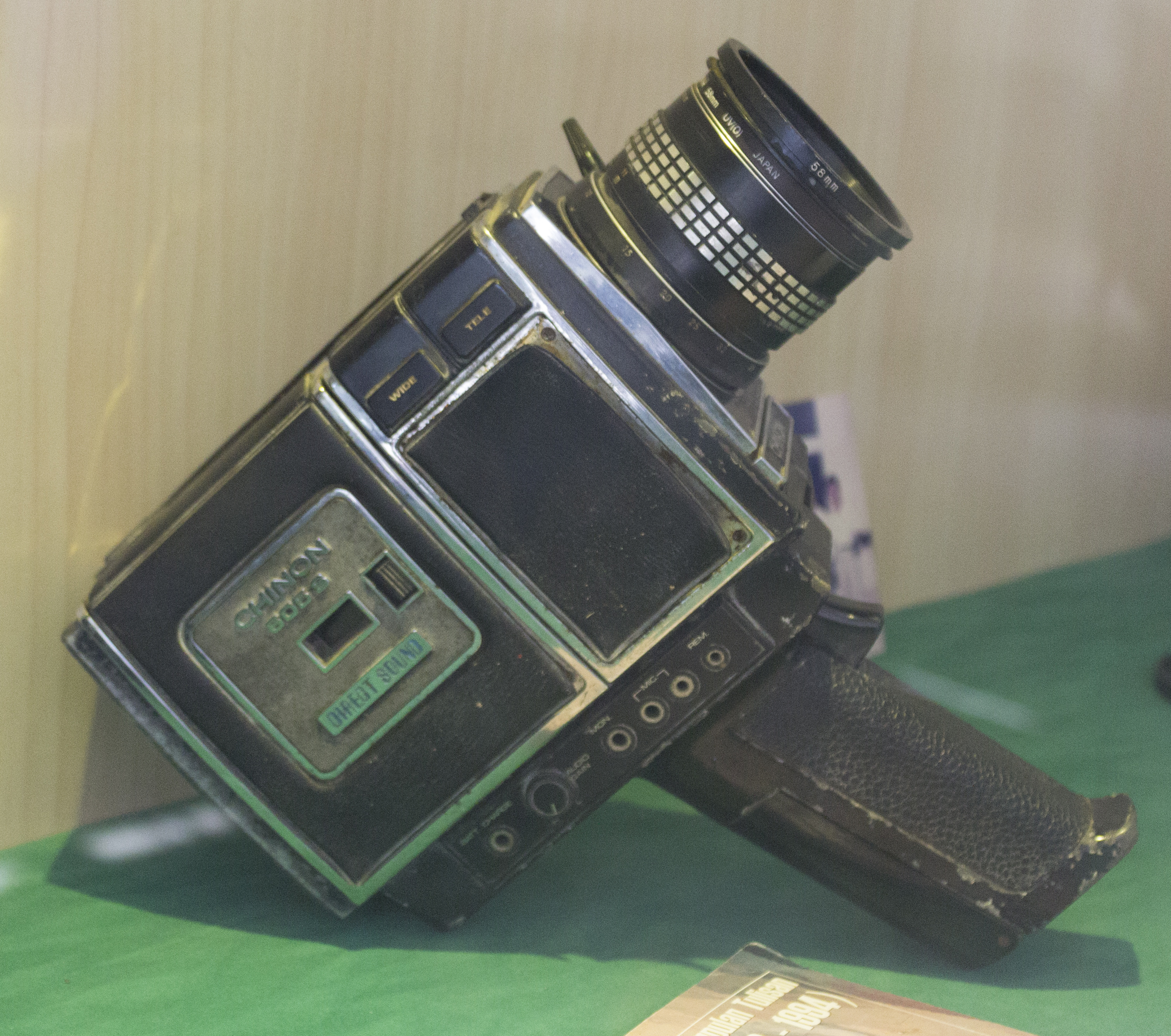
A Chinon 606S camera at the museum

The museum holds over a million newspapers and magazines published in various parts of the Indonesian archipelago from colonial times until the present day. It also has numerous pieces of communications technology and technology used in reporting, including aerials, typewriters, transmitters, telephones, and a large kenthongan. The front of the main entrance hall holds ten busts of important figures in the history of journalism in Indonesia. This includes Tirto Adhi Soerjo, Djamaluddin Adinegoro, Sam Ratulangi, and Ernest Douwes Dekker.

In the rear of the main entrance hall is a series of six dioramas illustrating communications and the press throughout Indonesian history. The first diorama shows various forms of communication and news-sharing in pre-colonial Indonesia. The second diorama shows the press in the colonial period, including the first newspaper in the Indies under the Dutch East India Company, Memories der Nouvelles (1615); the first printed newspaper in the Indies, the Bataviasche Nouvelles (1744), and the first Javanese newspaper in the Indies, Bromartani (1855). The third diorama depicts the press during the Japanese occupation, whereas the fourth depicts the press during the National Revolution – including the formation of the PWI. The fifth diorama shows the state of the press during the New Order under President Suharto, a time of great press censorship. The final diorama depicts the press after the beginning of Reformasi in 1998, in which greater freedom of the press has been granted.

The museum also holds various artefacts which belonged to journalists from pre- and post-independence Indonesia. This includes an Underwood typewriter which once belonged to Bakrie Soeriatmadja, a vocal journalist for the Bandung-based Sipatahoenan; a shirt in which Hendro Subroto was shot while covering the Indonesian occupation of East Timor in 1975; parachuting equipment used by Trisnojuwono in covering the solar eclipse of 11 June 1983; and a camera used by Fuad Muhammad Syafruddin, a journalist for the Yogyakarta-based Bernas who was killed after covering a corruption scandal in 1995. More artefacts, from journalists such as Mochtar Lubis, were still being acquired as of October 2013.

== See also ==
- List of museums and cultural institutions in Indonesia

== Works cited ==
- Amani, Asef (28 April 2013). "Monumen Pers Nasional Agresif Gaet Wisatawan" [National Press Monument Aggressively Seeking Visitors]. Suara Merdeka (in Indonesian). Semarang. Archived from the original on 8 December 2013.
- Budhiyanto, David Kristian (2012). "Perancangan Visual Branding Monumen Pers Nasional Di Surakarta" [Visual Branding Plans of the National Press Monument in Surakarta]. DKV Adiwarna (in Indonesian). 1 (1). Surabaya. Archived from the original on 2017-05-11.
- Koleksi Benda Pers Bersejarah Monumen Pers Nasional [Collection of Historical Press Artefacts at the National Press Monument] (brochure) (in Indonesian), Ministry of Communications and Information, 2013
- "Kota Surakarta" [Surakarta City] (in Indonesian). Representatives of Central Java. 2011. Archived from the original on 5 December 2013.
- "Monumen Pers Nasional" (in Indonesian). City Planning Bureau of Surakarta. 10 September 2012. Archived from the original on 13 December 2013.
- "Monumen Pers Nasional Butuh Dukungan Swasta" [National Press Monument Needs Private Support] (in Indonesian). Jogja TV. 18 May 2012.
- Profil Monumen Pers Nasional 2013 [Profile of the National Press Monument, 2013] (brochure) (in Indonesian), Ministry of Communications and Information, 2013
- Sarmun, Budi (15 September 2013). "2012, Monumen Pers Nasional Targetkan 10.000 Pengunjung" [For 2012, the National Press Monument's Target is 10,000 Visitors]. Suara Merdeka (in Indonesian). Semarang. Archived from the original on 12 January 2014.
- Sarmun, Budi (20 October 2013). "Pengunjung MPN Tembus 26.249 Orang" [MPN Receives 26,249 Visitors]. Suara Merdeka (in Indonesian). Semarang. Archived from the original on 12 December 2013.
- van der Kroef, Justus M. (March 1979). "Indonesia: After the Student Revolt". South East Asian Studies. 16 (4): 625–37.
- Video Profil Monumen Pers Nasional [Video Profile of the National Press Monument] (in Indonesian). Jakarta: Ministry of Communications and Information. 2013.
