= Foreign Correspondents' Club =

Group of clubs for foreign correspondents and other journalists

Foreign Correspondents' Club is a group of clubs for foreign correspondents and other journalists. Some clubs are members only, and some are open to the public.

In 1883, the first associations of foreign correspondents were founded in Paris: Syndicat de la Presse Étrangère à Paris : 10 rue Lentonnet, Paris 9; f . 1883; Pres . Elisabeth Dmitrieff; Sec . - Gen . Sylvain Krainik, avocat à la Cour et jour naliste; Mme SOPHIA Dimonte. and Vienna. In 1888, the Foreign Press Association was founded in London.

== Cambodia ==
The Foreign Correspondents' Club in Phnom Penh, capital of Cambodia, is a public bar and restaurant along the Tonle Sap river, not far from the conjunction with the Mekong river. It is often referred to as "the FCC," or just simply "the F."

The FCC in Phnom Penh is a for-profit restaurant, not a membership club for journalists. Members from reciprocal clubs get a 10% discount on food and drinks.

== China ==
China has three foreign correspondents' clubs, based in Beijing, Shanghai, and Hong Kong.

=== Beijing ===
The Foreign Correspondents' Club of China was established in Beijing in 1981. The objectives of the club are to promote friendship and professional exchange among foreign correspondents stationed in China, to promote professionalism in journalism and to defend the ideals of freedom of the press and the free exchange of information. It holds several speaking and social events each month, and conducts an annual Working Conditions Survey of its members which often highlights issues related to press freedom in China. The Chinese government has labelled the Beijing Foreign Correspondents' Club as "an illegal organisation"

=== Shanghai ===
The Shanghai Foreign Correspondents Club (SFCC) aims to provide a forum for discussion of important issues of the day, introduce its members to new business and cultural personalities, and allow members of the Shanghai journalism community to meet each other on an informal basis. The SFCC also serves as the foreign correspondents community's voice to the Shanghai government and foreign affairs office on issues that concern their members.

=== Hong Kong ===
The Foreign Correspondents' Club was founded in Chongqing in 1943 and moved to Hong Kong from Shanghai in 1949. It is a club for the media, business and diplomatic community. Originally an expansive villa with hotel rooms located on the now-residential 41 Conduit Road.

The FCC is a members-only club with membership claimed to range from the reporters, photographers and radio and television teams, the Chief Executive of the territory and leading figures in the worlds of business and diplomacy - although membership isn't exclusive to those in the media.

When prominent international figures from the worlds of commerce, politics or entertainment visit Hong Kong, many choose to address the FCC's speaker lunches as the best means of reaching their desired audience - both directly and through media coverage of the events.

In 2002, the club launched a charity ball featuring major musical acts that attracts attendees from across Asia. The ball raised millions to educate children from the Po Leung Kuk orphanage, though its last edition was in 2015.

== India ==
The FCC in New Delhi has a long pedigree, having been founded in 1958 by correspondents covering the Indian subcontinent from Tibet to Sri Lanka. It has more than 500 journalist members still covering as much of region as possible. New Delhi was and remains the natural locus of the subcontinent from the perspective of the press by virtue of being the capital of India, having extensive residential, schooling and entertainment options for families, and having the benefit of nonstop flights to dozens of cities in the subcontinent. Most correspondents of international media outlets tend to cover not only India but also all neighboring countries, including Afghanistan, Bangladesh, Bhutan, Nepal, Pakistan, and Sri Lanka from a permanent base in New Delhi.

In 1990, the FCC obtained its own premises on Mathura Road, a major thoroughfare, in New Delhi.

== Indonesia ==
The Jakarta Foreign Correspondents Club (JFCC) is a non-profit organization for international journalists in Indonesia. The group regularly hosts luncheons with key newsmakers in Indonesia and topical panel discussions. Membership is open to non-journalists.

== Japan ==
The Foreign Correspondents' Club of Japan (FCCJ) was started in 1945 to provide infrastructure for foreign journalists working in post-World War II Japan. Historically, the club has been located in the area around the Ginza.

The club offers a workroom facility, a library, a restaurant, a bar, and a steady stream of local and international speakers and panels.

It is a member's club but visiting correspondents are eligible for a 30-day membership. Long standing members are affectionately referred to within the club as "squirrels"; hence, the club itself is known as "Squirrel Corner".

== Malaysia ==
The Foreign Correspondents Club of Malaysia is a non-profit organisation, established in 2011 to aid foreign correspondents working in Malaysia.

The club organises regular briefings, debates and receptions with government officials, politicians, leading civil society figures, business leaders, analysts, academics and authors. The club also holds monthly social events.

The FCCM includes members from all major foreign news media based in Kuala Lumpur. Associate members include journalists from the local media, foreign diplomats, government agency and trade office representatives, executives from the business community and non-government organisations.

== Philippines ==
The Foreign Correspondents Association of the Philippines was established in 1974 in Manila and serves as the club for foreign correspondents in the country.

== Singapore ==
The Foreign Correspondents Association of Singapore is a foreign journalist organization. Founded in 1956, it is not associated with the Foreign Correspondents' Clubs.

== South Korea ==
The Seoul Foreign Correspondents’ Club (FCC) has about 500 members, including representatives of about 100 media organizations.

== Taiwan ==
The Taiwan Foreign Correspondents' Club was founded in 1998 as a members-only club for foreign correspondents and representatives from local media outlets as well as government officials and businesspeople.

== Thailand ==
The Foreign Correspondents' Club of Thailand (FCCT) located in Bangkok, has been an established press club for more than 50 years.

== London ==
There is no official Foreign Correspondents' Club in London, but there are a number of clubs and groups that support journalists in the UK.

The Frontline Club, located near to Paddington in London is a club for journalists, photographers and people interested in international affairs. The club frequently holds events including panels and discussions open to the public, and advocates for press freedom around the world. It operates a reciprocal membership scheme with a number of Foreign Correspondents' Clubs

The China Correspondents' Club of London is a professional non-profit organisation supporting China-focused international journalists in the UK, as well as Chinese journalists in the UK with the aim of promoting greater interaction between Chinese and international media. Membership consists of journalists as well as other professionals focused on China.. The group frequently organises panels and events.

== See also ==
- Overseas Press Club
