= IAPC =

IAPC may stand for:

- International Association of Press Clubs
- Institute for the Advancement of Philosophy for Children, a Philosophy for Children organisation
- International Auditing Practices Committee, now the International Auditing and Assurance Standards Board
