= Bernas =

Bernas may refer to:

- Bernas (newspaper), an Indonesian online-only newspaper
- Joaquin Bernas (1932-2021), Filipino Jesuit priest, lawyer, and professor
- Richard Bernas (born 1950), American conductor
- Paweł Bernas (born 1990), Polish racing cyclist
