= Mortaza Behboudi =

Franco-Afghan journalist

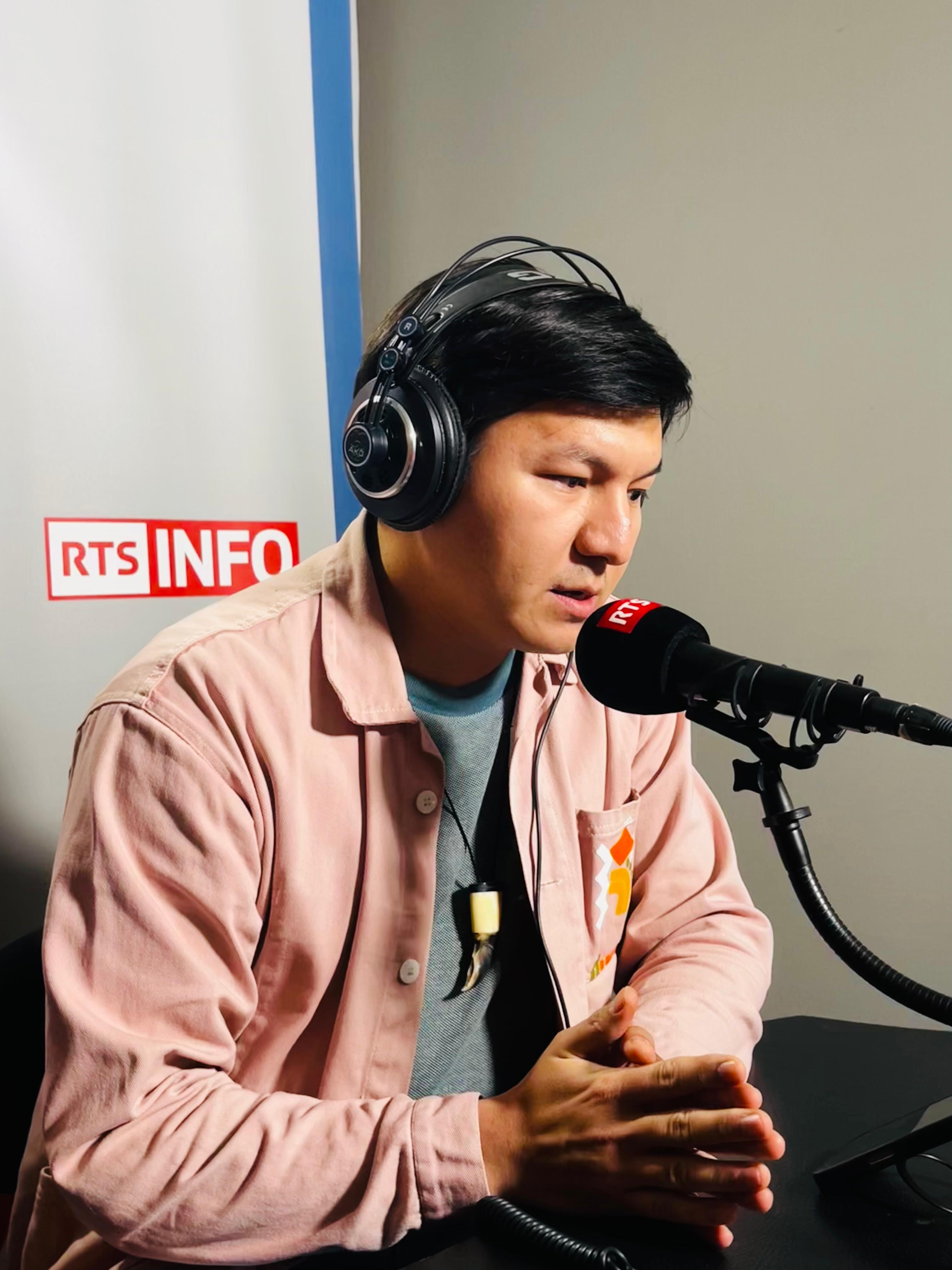
- Born: 22 April 1994 (age 32); Maidan Wardak Province, Afghanistan
- Education: Pantheon-Sorbonne University (MA)
- Occupation: Journalist · Documentary Filmmaker
- Spouse: Aleksandra Mostovaja (m. 2024-present)

Mortaza Behboudi (Persian/Dari: مرتضی بهبودی; born April 22, 1994) is a French war reporter, writer, and documentary filmmaker. In 2019, he was featured in Forbes 30 under 30 in the category of Media and Marketing for his work on Guiti News. Mortaza Behboudi is Bayeux Calvados-Normandy War Correspondents Prize and Prix Varenne winner in the year 2022. On January the 7th, 2023, Behboudi was detained and imprisoned by the Taliban in Afghanistan, from where he had been reporting for a variety of international media since the Taliban's takeover of Afghanistan in 2021. He was released from his detention after 284 days on the 18th of October, 2023.

== Early life and education ==
Mortaza Behboudi was born in Afghanistan, in the Wardak province. He is of Hazara ethnicity, a minority. He became a refugee in 1996 when his parents fled to Iran to escape the newly established Taliban regime. There, at the age of seven, he started working at a local brick factory together with his family. Behboudi joined a carpet factory when he was twelve, where he worked at night whilst attending school during the day.

In 2012, Behboudi came back to Afghanistan to earn his bachelor’s degree in Law and Political Science at Kabul University. In Kabul, he would work as a reporter and cameraman for several journals and TV stations. He also founded the first economic paper in Afghanistan, Daily Bazar, in 2014. Behboudi had to flee the country when in 2015 he published an investigative piece that led to him being targeted by the Taliban. After being unable to gain asylum in the United States, UK, or Italy, he was accepted by the French. In Paris, he was protected and hosted by The House of Journalists (French: La Maison des Journalistes). During this time, he studied at Pantheon-Sorbonne University to obtain his master's degree in International Relations.

== Career ==
Since 2012, Behboudi has worked as a journalist in over 35 countries. Mortaza co-founded Guiti News in 2018 and was the director of publication until 2020. The online media platform is the first refugee-led media in France and provides a different perspective on news and migration. For this initiative, Behboudi was selected for Forbes 30 Under 30 2019 in the category of Media and Marketing. He continued his humanitarian work from 2018 as a consulting editor and communication specialist at UNESCO until 2019. Since 2017, Mortaza Behboudi has been invited to several High Schools around France to promote media education.

In 2020, he was reporting from inside Greece's largest refugee camp, the refugee camp Moria. From March to August he was confined inside the camp, living with thousands of refugees to report on their daily lives. In addition to this, he was working on his documentary film, Moria, a Living Hell (French: Moria, par-delà l'enfer) for Arte, which was selected for the Festival de Cinéma de Douarnenez in 2021.

Since 2021, Behboudi has worked with several news medias on the coverage of Afghanistan. In 2022, Behboudi won the Bayeux Calvados-Normandy War Correspondents Prize in the section of Television Trophy for his report that was done with France 2 called "Les petites filles afghanes vendues pour survivre".

Together with the French journalist Rachida El Azzouzi, he also won the 3rd Prize at Bayeux Calvados-Normandy War Correspondents Awards in the Written Press category, as well as the Varenne Prize in the category of the National Daily Press for their series of reports "A travers l'Afghanistan, sous les Talibans”. Behboudi is the co-director together with Rachida El Azzouzi of the documentary "They will not erase us, the fight of the Afghan women", which was produced in 2022 and broadcast on Mediapart and Arte.

On January the 7th, 2023, Behboudi was detained and imprisoned by the Taliban in Afghanistan, from where he had been reporting for a variety of international media since the Taliban's takeover of Afghanistan in 2021. A Support Committee working to secure his release was convened on February 9, 2023 by Reporters Without Borders and includes organizations such as Arte, France 24, France Info, La Croix, Libération, Marianne, Mediapart, Radio France, TV5Monde, the Council of Paris, the Human Rights League, Paris 1 Panthéon-Sorbonne University and The Paris Institute for Critical Thinking. While detained, he won the International Association of Press Clubs Freedom of Speech Award, and was nominated for the Index on Censorship Freedom of Expression Award. After 9 months of campaigning, Mortaza Behboudi was released on the 18th of October, 2023.

In 2025, Behboudi published his first book, Woman, Life, Freedom: An undercover reporter at the heart of the Iranian revolt (French: Femme, vie, liberté: Un reporter infiltré au coeur de la révolte iranienne) with Marine Courtade. The book received the Literary Prize of Stéphane Frantz di Rippel awarded by the City of Biot. Same year, Mortaza Behboudi wrote the book, Fixers: Reporters Without Bylines, with Oksana Leuta, which was published by The Paris Institute of Critical Thinking.

== Awards and recognition ==
- 2019: Forbes 30 under 30 in the category of Media and Marketing
- 2020: Ambassador for One Young World
- 2022: Nominee of One Young World - Journalist of the Year Award
- 2022: Winner of Bayeux Calvados-Normandy War Correspondents Prize in the section of Television Trophy
- 2022: 3rd Place Winner of Bayeux Calvados-Normandy War Correspondents Prize in the section of Print Trophy
- 2022: Winner of Prix Varenne in the section of National Daily Press
- 2023: Winner of IAPC Freedom of Speech Award
- 2023: Nominee of Index on Censorship Freedom of Expression Award
- 2024: Special Prize recipient of Anna Politkovskaya-Arman Soldin Prize
- 2024: Nominee of Albert Londres Prize in the Audiovisual section
- 2025: Winner of the Literary Prize of Stéphane Frantz di Rippel awarded by the City of Biot
