= Mulyono Sulaiman =

Indonesian police officer

Chief of Greater Jakarta Metropolitan Regional Police
- In office 21 October 2000 – 8 May 2001
- Preceded by: Nurfaizi Suwandi
- Succeeded by: Sofjan Jacoeb

Inspector General of the Department of Forestry
- Incumbent
- Assumed office 17 April 2001
- President: Abdurrahman Wahid

Chief of Special Region of Yogyakarta Regional Police
- In office 20 September 1996 – 24 April 1997
- Preceded by: Darsono (as Police Chief of Yogyakarta Territory)
- Succeeded by: Bani Siswono

Personal details
- Citizenship: Indonesian
- Spouse: H. Afifah
- Children: Silvia Kamila Nur Fauziana Rahma

Military service
- Allegiance: Indonesia
- Branch/service: (Indonesia) Indonesian National Police
- Rank: Police Inspector General

Mulyono Sulaiman is a retired Indonesian National Police (Polri) high-ranking officer who served as the Chief of the Greater Jakarta Metropolitan Regional Police (Kapolda Metro Jaya) from October 2000 to May 2001, and previously as the first Chief of the Special Region of Yogyakarta Regional Police (Polda DIY) following its organizational upgrade in 1996.

== Police career ==
In September 1996, following the organizational elevation of the Yogyakarta Police Territory (Polwil) into the Type-C Special Region of Yogyakarta Regional Police (Polda DIY), Mulyono Sulaiman, then holding the rank of Police Colonel, was appointed as its first regional police chief, serving from 20 September 1996 until 24 April 1997. During his tenure in Yogyakarta, he oversaw the early investigation into the murder of Bernas investigative journalist Fuad Muhammad Syafruddin.

After serving as Deputy Assistant for Logistics to the Chief of the Indonesian National Police, he was inaugurated on 21 October 2000 by National Police Chief General Surojo Bimantoro as Chief of the Greater Jakarta Metropolitan Regional Police, succeeding Police Inspector General Nurfaizi Suwandi. Leading the capital's police force during the presidency of Abdurrahman Wahid, he handled security operations in Jakarta, including resolving protests by members of the People's Security (Kamra) auxiliary force in December 2000, coordinating with university officials regarding student demonstrations, overseeing criminal investigations in the capital, and maintaining public order alongside Jakarta Governor Sutiyoso and Military Commander Bibit Waluyo ahead of parliamentary special sessions in May 2001.

On 17 April 2001, under Presidential Decree No. 125/M of 2001, Mulyono Sulaiman was appointed by Forestry Minister Marzuki Usman as Inspector General of the Department of Forestry. Following his transfer, he formally handed over command of the Greater Jakarta Metropolitan Regional Police to Police Inspector General Sofjan Jacoeb on 8 May 2001.
