= Yuliya Slutskaya =

Belarusian journalist (born 1964)

- Юлія Слуцкая
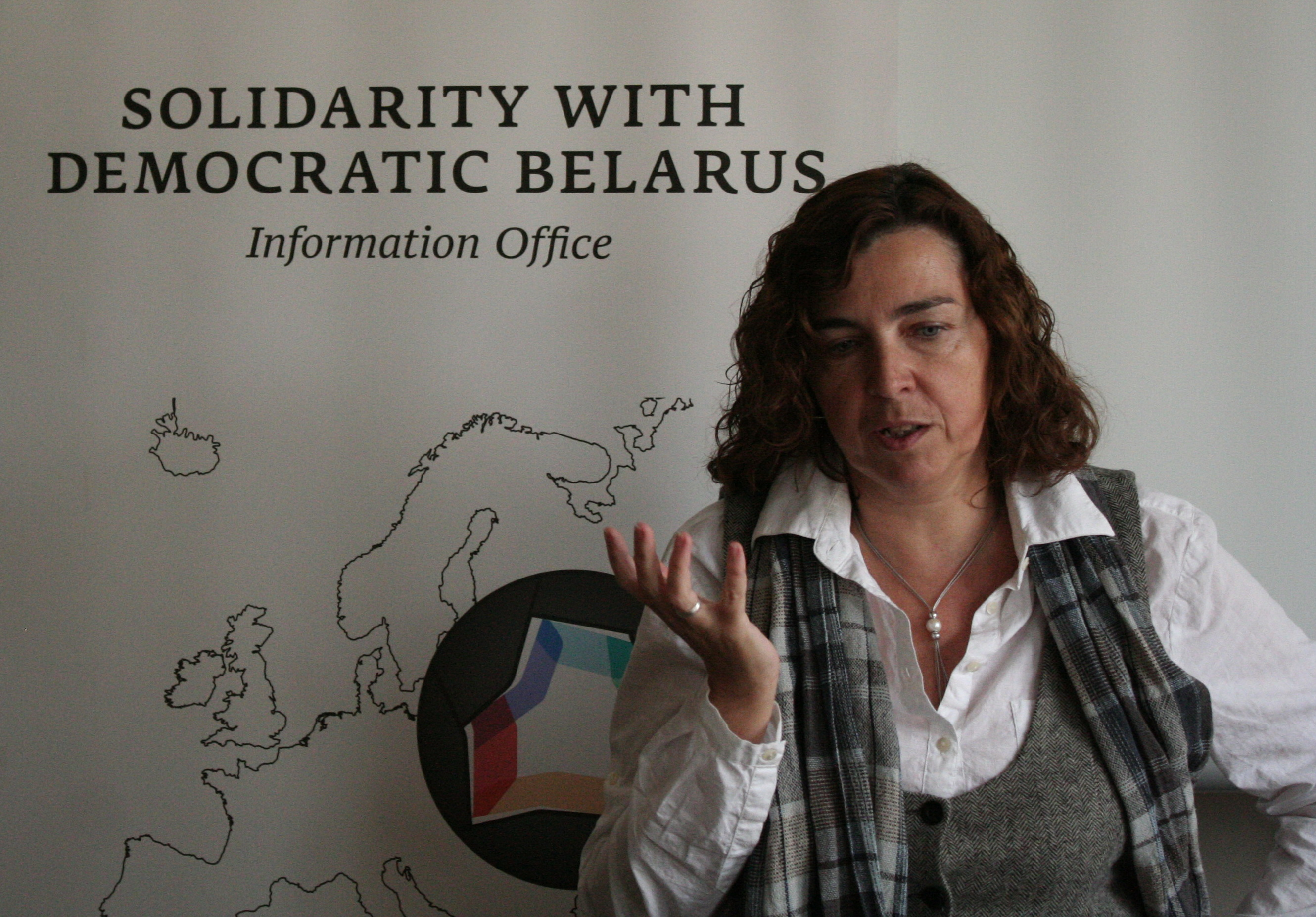
- Slutskaya in 2011
- Born: 15 September 1964 (age 61); Byelorussian SSR, Soviet Union
- Citizenship: Belarus
- Education: Belarusian State University
- Occupation: Journalist
- Years active: 1994–present
- Organization: Tell the Truth
- Criminal charges: Tax evasion
- Criminal penalty: Fine
- Awards: Freedom of Speech Award (2021)

Yuliya Vitalyeuna Slutskaya (Belarusian: Юлія Вітальеўна Слуцкая; born 15 September 1964) is a Belarusian journalist and former political prisoner. She is the founder of Press Club Belarus and the Information Bureau of Solidarity with Belarus.

== Early life and education ==
Slutskaya studied sociology from the Belarusian State University. She spent several years after her graduation working for the university's sociology department.

== Journalism career ==
Slutskaya began working as a journalist in 1994, initially working for BelKP-Pres as a sociologist. By 1997, she had become the editor of Komsomolskaya Pravda v Belorussii, a Belarusian Russian-language newspaper which she was among the founding members. By the time Slutskaya resigned as editor in 2006, the newspaper had a circulation of almost 330, 000, with around half of every edition focusing specifically on Belarusian issues. Slutskaya resigned following the 2006 Belarusian presidential election.

In 2007, Slutskaya was named editor-in-chief of European Radio for Belarus, an independent radio station. She voluntarily left the role in February 2011.

== Activism ==
In February 2010, the pro-democracy and anti-corruption Tell the Truth campaign was established, which nominated Uladzimir Nyaklyayew as its candidate in the 2010 Belarusian presidential election. Slutskaya conceived and implement Tell the Truth's media campaign, and also served a media consultant for Nyaklyayew. During the 2010 Belarusian protests, following which many of the Tell the Truth leadership were detained at the KGB RB prison Amerikanka, and its offices searched, Slutskaya was forced to flee Belarus for Warsaw, Poland.

In January 2011, Slutskaya established the Information Bureau of Solidarity with Belarus from Warsaw. The organisation toured European capitals ahead of the European Parliament and European Council's planned sessions discussing Belarus, including Poland, Lithuania, the Czech Republic, Germany, Denmark, the Netherlands and Sweden. The group's actions included holding meetings, organising conferences and photo exhibitions, and screening a film about the 2010 protests.

Slutskaya later returned to Minsk, where in 2015 she established Press Club Belarus which, in addition to delivering lectures and training, monitored Belarusian media outlets' compliance with journalistic standards and ethics. In 2020, Press Club Belarus established a formal training institution, the Press Club Academy.

== Political persecution ==
On 22 December 2020, Slutskaya was detained at Minsk National Airport after returning to Belarus from abroad with her daughter and granddaughters. She was questioned by officers from the financial investigation department of the State Control Committee, following which she was placed in pre-trial detention at Pishchalauski Castle.

On 31 December, Slutskaya was charged with large-scale fraud under article 243 of the Criminal Code of Belarus. Other members of Press Club Belarus, including Piotr Slutsky, Alla Sharko and Sergei Alsheuski, as well as former Belteleradio journalist Ksenia Lutskina, were also arrested on charges of being complicit. Investigators claimed that the fraud stemmed from tax evasion linked to a public television project, while Slutskaya stated the charges against her stemmed from her journalistic activities. Slutskaya pleaded not guilty. The investigators did not provide documents demonstrating tax evasion.

On 6 January 2021, family members of the detained employees paid 109, 769 BYN to the Investigative Committee of Belarus, the amount of the alleged unpaid tax.

On 13 January 2021, a joint statement by eleven human rights and journalism organisations, including Viasna, the Belarusian Association of Journalists, Belaruski PEN and Pravavaya Initsyyatyva, recognised Slutskaya and her co-defendants as political prisoners. On 4 February 2021, Swiss politician Martina Munz of the Federal Assembly symbolically became Slutskaya's godparent.

On 19 August 2021, Slutskaya and her co-defendants were released from pre-trial detention after agreeing to plead guilty, pay a fine of 200, 000 BYN and sign a petition of support for Alexander Lukashenko.

== Recognition ==
In 2021, Slutskaya won the International Association of Press Clubs' Freedom of Speech Award, as well as being named as one of the International Press Institute's World Press Freedom Heroes.
