= Paris Institute for Critical Thinking =

Non-profit education and research center located in Paris

- Institut de Paris pour la Pensée Critique
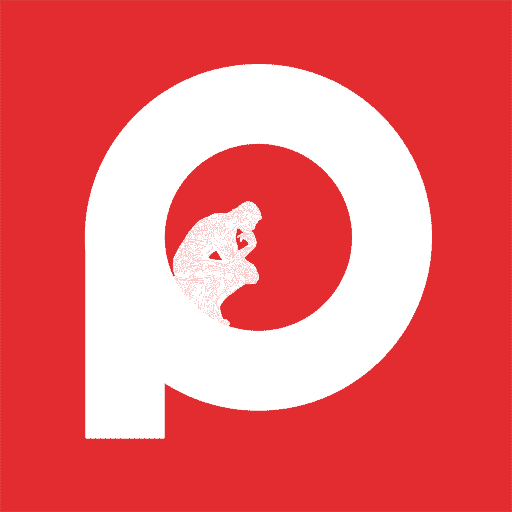
- Abbreviation: PICT
- Formation: 2018
- Headquarters: Paris, France
- Website: https://parisinstitute.org/

The Paris Institute for Critical Thinking (PICT) is a non-profit educational association located in Paris, France, dedicated to promoting critical thinking through the humanities and arts. It offers courses, lectures, and conferences that are open to the public; participates in international research projects; creates open-access online publications; and runs its own non-profit publishing house, PICT Books as well as the PICT Senlis Retreat for writers, artists, and intellectuals. The institute’s main language is English, which it approaches as a lingua franca of intercultural exchange.

== History and Activities ==
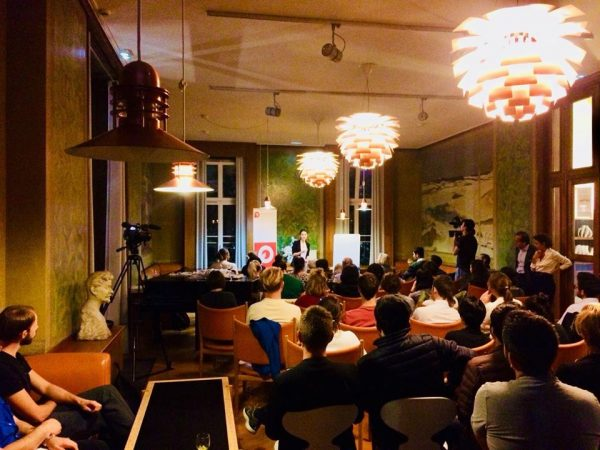
Philosophy scholar Evrim Emir-Sayers delivers the inaugural PICT Faculty Lecture at the Fondation Danoise, Paris, 26 September 2018

Established in 2018, PICT is a volunteer-run non-profit association registered with the French state. Its income, derived mainly from membership fees and book sales, is wholly invested back into the institute’s activities. Initially focused on in-person courses and live events, PICT rejected online education during the COVID-19 pandemic, instead commencing open-access publications including scholarly articles, interviews, reviews, and literary pieces such as English translations of works by Aşık Mahzuni Şerif, Âşık Veysel, Nâzım Hikmet, and Ahmed Arif. While in-person activities resumed after the pandemic, the institute’s main focus since 2024 has been its publishing house, PICT Books.

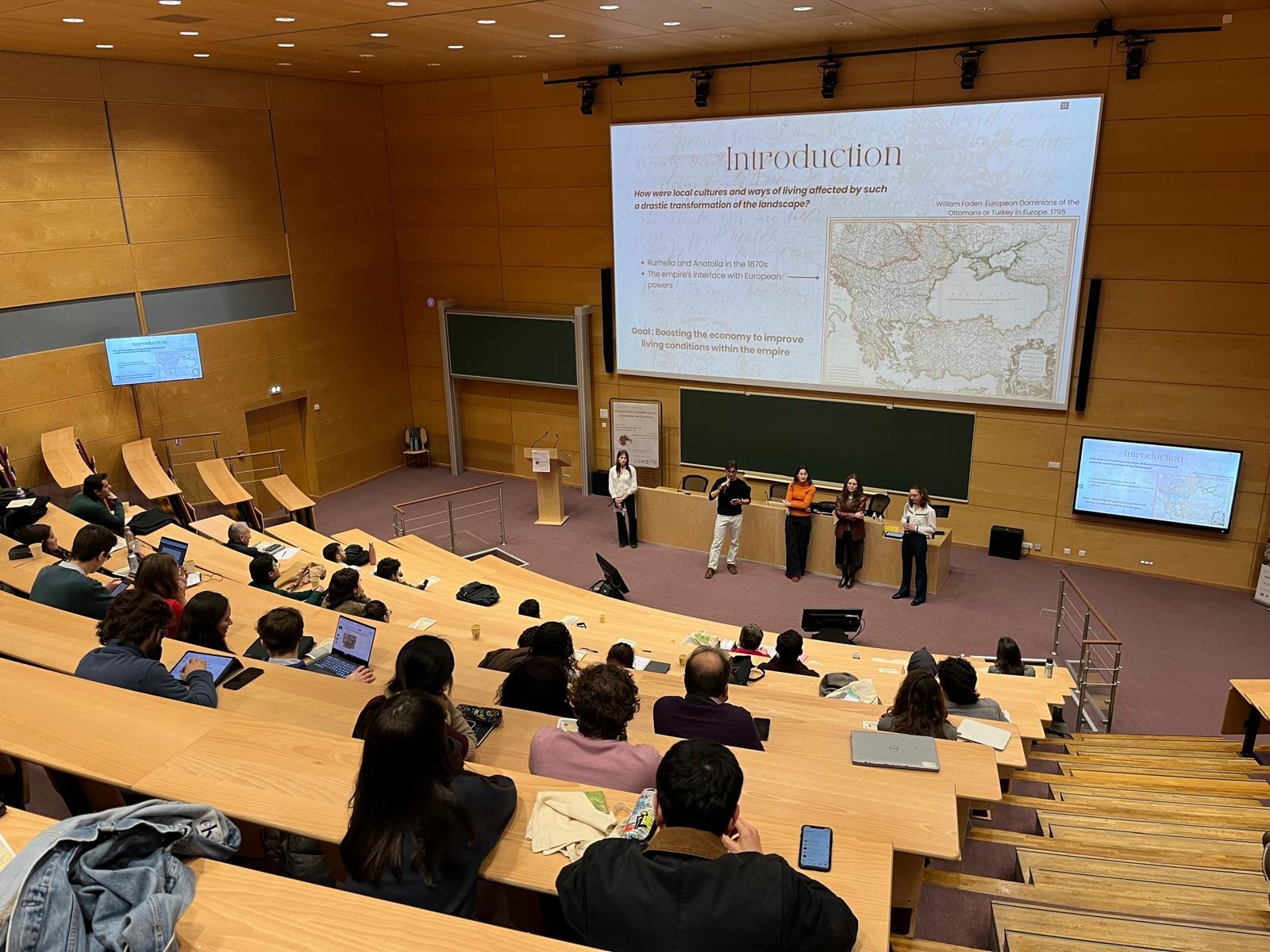
PICT Conference, “Ottoman Europe: A History on Rails”, École nationale des ponts et chaussées (ENPC), 29 January 2026

In 2021, PICT published the online article “The Real Academy in Exile” by David Selim Sayers and Evrim Emir-Sayers, which sparked an international debate in the field of Turkish Studies and received coverage in German and Turkish national media. In 2023, the institute participated in the successful campaign by Reporters Without Borders (RSF) to secure the release of Franco-Afghan journalist Mortaza Behboudi from prison in Afghanistan. In 2025, PICT was awarded a grant by the EELISA European University Alliance for the research and teaching project, “Railroads and European Identity from the 19th Century to the Present,” subsequently becoming a founding member of the EELISA Community, “Engineering Culture: Humanities, Infrastructure, and Society in Engineering” along with École nationale des ponts et chaussées, Istanbul Technical University, Technical University of Madrid, Budapest University of Technology and Economics, and Politehnica University of Bucharest.

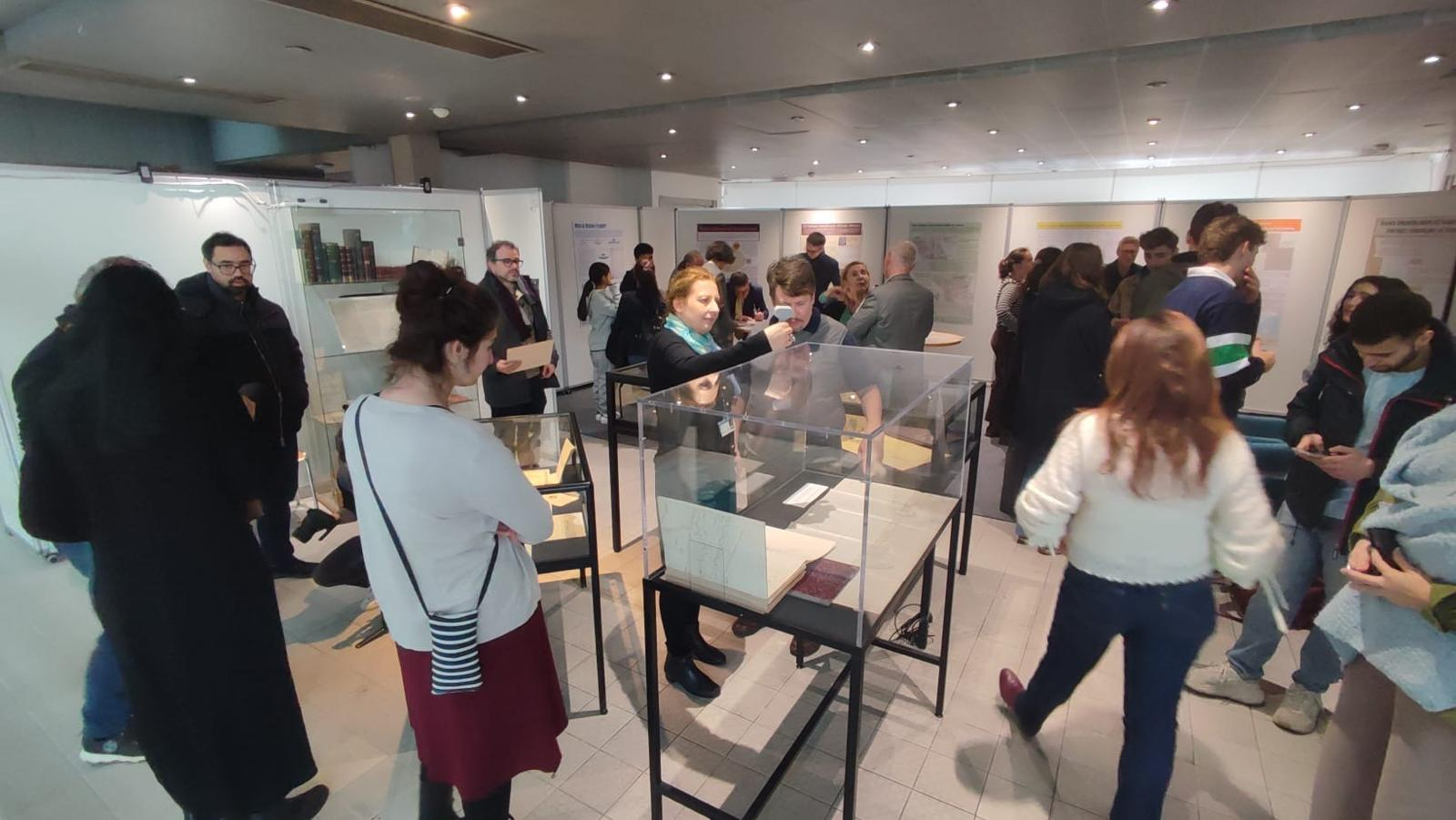
PICT exhibition, “Ottoman Europe: A History on Rails”, École nationale des ponts et chaussées (ENPC), 28 January 2026

=== PICT Books ===
PICT Books, the institute’s non-profit publishing house, has earned numerous accolades. The Veil of Depiction: Painting in Sufism and Phenomenology by Evrim Emir-Sayers was awarded a translation grant by Centre national du livre (CNL) in 2024. In the same year, Gender in Ottoman Constantinople by David Selim Sayers was chosen as book of the month by Athens Voice and book of the year by K24. Fulkumari: The Tale of a Refugee and a Rat in Pandemic Paris by Pinaki Bhattacharya, published in 2025, became an international Amazon bestseller. In 2026, Fixers: Reporters Without Bylines by Mortaza Behboudi and Oksana Leuta was recommended by the Global Investigative Journalism Network.

PICT Books has published the following volumes to date:

- Fixers: Reporters Without Bylines by Mortaza Behboudi and Oksana Leuta (2025)
- Fulkumari: The Tale of a Refugee and a Rat in Pandemic Paris by Pinaki Bhattacharya (2025)
- A Cuisine of Exile by Gün Benderli (2024)
- Gender in Ottoman Constantinople by David Selim Sayers (2024)
- The Veil of Depiction: Painting in Sufism and Phenomenology by Evrim Emir-Sayers (2024)
- Tiflî Hikâyeleri by David Selim Sayers (2023)

== Founders and Collaborators ==
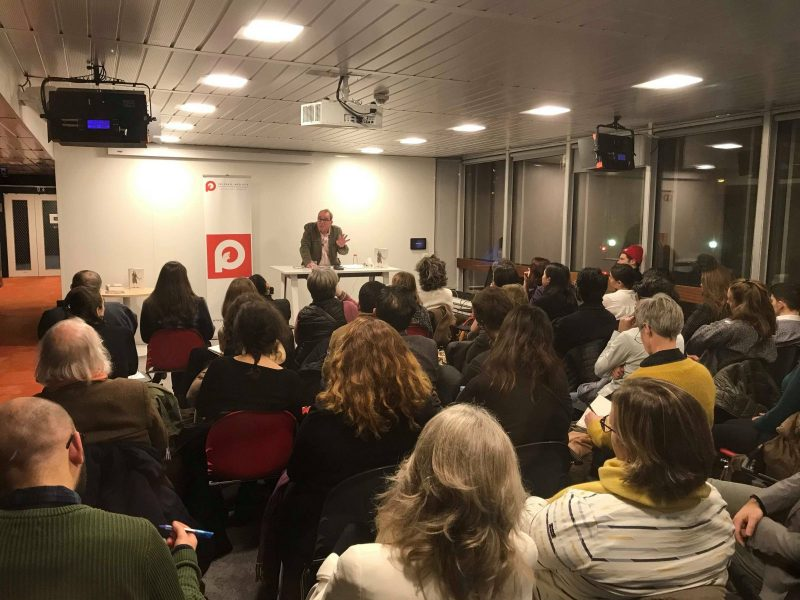
Jonathan Rée delivers the fourth PICT Honorary Lecture on "Wittgenstein and the History of Philosophy" at the Fondation Maison des sciences de l'homme (FMSH), Paris, 20 January 2020

PICT was founded, and continues to be operated, by an international collective made up of philosophy scholar Evrim Emir-Sayers, literature scholar Maria Matalaev, historian David Selim Sayers, filmmaker Hector Ulloque, and artist Sage Waters.

Notable collaborators have included anthropologist Joseba Zulaika, art historian S. Hollis Clayson, artist James Clayson, broadcaster David Cayley, civil rights activists Antoine Bernard, Gaye Petek, and Nadine Strossen, Cultural administrators Marius Hansteen and Pierre Tolcini, directors Atom Egoyan and Wolfgang Pannek, environmental researchers Dipali Mathur, Drew Pendergrass, and Troy Vettese, epidemiologist Sunetra Gupta, historians Michael A. Barry, François Cusset, and Zachary J. Foster, journalist Mortaza Behboudi, literature scholars Burghard Baltrusch, Eduardo Cadava, and Salamis Aysegul Sentug-Tugyan,, make-up artist Jessica Padilla, philosopher Fahim Amir, philosophy scholars Viktoras Bachmetjevas, Natasha Lushetich, Iain MacKenzie, Felix Ó Murchadha, Jonathan Rée, Carlo Salzani, and Zipporah Weisberg, photographers Andrew Lyndon-Skeggs and Rose Hartman, playwright Mark Ravenhill, Semiotician Astrid Guillaume, Sociologists Frank Furedi, Victoria Pitts-Taylor, Alexander I. Stingl, and Wolfgang Streeck, and translator Gün Benderli. The Halman Library imprint of PICT Books is dedicated to the memory of public intellectual Talât Sait Halman.

=== Partnerships ===
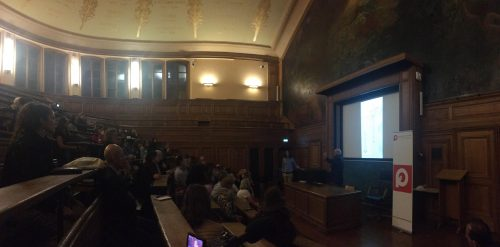
Historian Michael Barry delivers the inaugural PICT Honorary Lecture at the Sorbonne, Paris, 8 October 2018

PICT has partnered up with various institutions for the organization of courses, conferences, research projects, and other events. These include:

- Budapest University of Technology and Economics
- Cambridge Society of Paris
- Collège d’Études Mondiales
- École nationale des ponts et chaussées
- EELISA European University Alliance
- Fondation Biermans-Lapôtre
- Fondation Danoise
- Fondation Maison des Sciences de l’Homme (FMSH)
- Goethe-Institut Paris
- Independent Social Research Foundation (ISRF)
- Istanbul Technical University
- London Group of Multilingual Writers (LGMW)
- Maison de la Vie Associative et Citoyenne de Paris Centre — site Marais
- Maison des Écrivains et de la Littérature
- Maison des Étudiants Suedois
- Politehnica University of Bucharest
- Reporters Without Borders
- San Francisco Books Paris
- Sorbonne University
- Technical University of Madrid
- The Abbey Bookshop
- UNESCO
- University of Kent
- University of Vigo
