= Press Club Brussels Europe =

The Press Club Brussels Europe is a joint initiative of the Associations of International Journalists based in Brussels and the Brussels-Capital Region and has been inaugurated in December 2010 by the former President of the European Commission José Manuel Barroso. It is the main communication platform in Brussels grouping journalists and international correspondents as well as embassies, permanent representations to the EU, NGOs, lobby groups and think tanks. It aims at providing a forum for conferences and debates with and amongst members of the media.

The Press Club Brussels Europe is an active member of The International Association of Press Clubs and has assumed its presidency in October 2019.

The Press Club Brussels Europe’s Presidents include members of the media such as Maroun Labaki, former head of the international section at the journal Le Soir. In 2024, the Press Club Brussels Europe’s President is Alia Papageorgiou.

Since 2022, the Press Club is also home to the We are Kyiv Press Club.
