= International Association of Press Clubs =

- Abbreviation: IAPC
- Formation: 2002
- Type: International non-governmental organization
- Legal status: Association
- Purpose: Press freedom, professional standards of journalism
- Headquarters: Warsaw, Poland
- Region served: Worldwide
- Members: Press Clubs and Foreign Correspondents Clubs
- Official language: English
- Main organ: General Assembly
- Website: pressclubs.org

The International Association of Press Clubs (IAPC) is an international collaborative chain of national organisations (Press Clubs and FCCs) which support the professional endeavours of its members and the principle of a free press.

Reporters Without Borders received the first IAPC Freedom of Speech Award in 2013 for their "outstanding contributions to the defense or the struggle for freedom of expression, the creation of conditions to support freedom of speech".

== Members organizations ==
Flag	Name	City	Country State	Founded	Comment
(Australia)	National Press Club of Australia	Canberra	Australia	1963	
(Austria)	Press Club Concordia	Vienna	Austria	1859	
(Europe)	Press Club Brussels Europe	Brussels	Belgium	2010	
(Luxembourg)	Maison de la Presse de Liege et de Luxembourg	Liege	Luxembourg		
(China)	Foreign Correspondents' Club of China	Beijing	China		
(China)	Shanghai Foreign Correspondents' Club	Shanghai	China		
(Czech Republic)	International Press Club of Prague	Prague	Czech Republic		
(France)	Press Club de France	Paris	France	1986	
(France)	Club de la Presse de Bordeaux	Bordeaux Cedex	France		
(France)	Club de la Presse de Lyon	Lyon	France		
(France)	Club de la Presse de Montpellier	Montpellier	France		
(France)	Club de la Presse de Strasbourg	Strasbourg	France		
(France)	Club de la Presse Nord-Pas de Calais	Lille Cedex	France		
(Germany)	Berliner Presse Club	Berlin	Germany	1952	
(Germany)	Frankfurter PresseClub	Frankfurt	Germany		
(Germany)	International Press Club of Munich	Munich	Germany		
(United Kingdom)	London Press Club	London	Great Britain	1882	
(Hong Kong)	Foreign Correspondents' Club of Hong Kong	Hong Kong	Hong Kong	1943	
(India)	Foreign Correspondents' Club of South Asia	New Delhi	India		
(India)	Press Club of India	New Delhi	India	1957	
(Indonesia)	Jakarta Foreign Correspondents Club	Jakarta	Indonesia		
(Israel)	Jerusalem Press Club	Jerusalem	Israel		
(Italy)	Circolo della Stampa Milano	Milan	Italy		
(Japan)	Japan National Press Club	Tokyo	Japan	1945	
(Japan)	Foreign Correspondents' Club of Japan	Tokyo	Japan	1945	
(Malaysia)	Foreign Correspondents Club of Malaysia	Kuala Lumpur	Malaysia		
(Monaco)	National Press Club of Mongolia	Ulaanbaatar	Mongolia		
(Nepal)	National Press Club of Nepal	Lalitpur	Nepal		
(Netherlands)	Internationaal Perscentrum Nieuwspoort	Den Haag	Netherlands		
(New Zealand)	National Press Club of New Zealand	Wellington	New Zealand		
(Poland)	Press Club Polska	Warsaw	Poland	2009	
(Poland)	Polish Club of International Columnists	Warsaw	Poland		
(Portugal)	Clube de Jornalistas	Lisbon	Portugal		
(Singapore)	Foreign Correspondents Association of Singapore	Singapore	Singapore	1956	
(Singapore)	Singapore Press Club	Singapore	Singapore	1971	
(South Korea)	Seoul Foreign Correspondents' Club	Seoul	South Korea		
(Switzerland)	Geneva Press Club (Le Club Suisse de la presse, or Swiss Press Club)	Geneva	Switzerland		
(Taiwan)	Taiwan Foreign Correspondents' Club	Taipei	Taiwan		
(Thailand)	Foreign Correspondents' Club of Thailand	Bangkok	Thailand		
(Ukraine)	Ukrainian Press Clubs Association	Kyiv	Ukraine		
(United States)	Overseas Press Club of America	New York	United States of America	1939	
(United States)	Foreign Press Association of the United States		United States of America	1918	
(United Nations)	International Association of Press Clubs	Warsaw	Poland	2002	
