= Rico Sempurna Pasaribu =

Indonesian journalist (died 2024)

Rico Sempurna Pasaribu (c. 1984 – 27 June 2024) was an Indonesian journalist who worked for the Medan-based Tribrata TV covering regional news in North Sumatra. In June 2024, he died alongside his wife, daughter and grandson in a house fire, shortly after reporting on allegations of gambling, prostitution and drug running by a senior figure in the Indonesian Army.

== Career ==
Pasaribu worked for Tribrata TV, an online news website based in Medan that often reported on local police activities in North Sumatra.

On 22 June 2024, Tribrata TV published an article by Pasaribu which alleged that an illegal gambling den located close to the barracks of the 125th Infantry Battalion in the Pedangmas district of Kabanjahe was operated by a corporal within the Indonesian Army. Following the article's publication, the Journalist Safety Committee reported that the soldier in question had threatened Pasaribu and requested Tribrata TV's chief editor, Edrin Adriansyah, to remove the article. Pasaribu and Adriansyah declined the request, and Pasaribu subsequently stayed away from his home for several days.

A spokesperson for the Indonesian Army stated that local authorities had interviewed the soldier identified by Pasaribu, and that their investigation had found that he was not involved in gambling or any other illegal activities.

On 26 June, religious protests occurred outside of the 125th Battalion barracks following the report of gambling, prostitution and drug running by soldiers. Pasaribu came out of hiding to report on the protests, and subsequently returned with his family to his home in Kabanjahe, North Sumatra.

== Death and investigation ==
In the early hours of 27 June 2024, a fire started at Pasaribu's home, which also served as a shop run by his wife. Later that day, the body of Pasaribu, his wife, daughter, as well as a grandson they have been babysitting, were found in the home.

North Sumatra Police stated that they had arrested three suspects and interviewed 28 witnesses. One of the suspects, Bebas Ginting, was the former head of the Angkatan Muda Pemhararuan Indonesia, a youth organisation linked to Golkar, a political party that had official links with the Indonesian military during the Suharto regime.

The Alliance of Independent Journalists completed its own investigation into the fire, citing concerns that the police investigation would cover up potential evidence linking it to the military. Its chairperson, Cristison Sondang Pane, stated that Pasaribu had initially accepted weekly stipends from the gambling ring with an agreement not to report on its links to the military; and suggested that Pasaribu published articles reporting on it after the ring declined to extend the payments to include a local youth centre. Sondang Pane stated that many Indonesian journalists were forced into accepting bribes due to low salaries. In response, the Journalist Safety Committee reiterated that Pasaribu's alleged breaches of journalistic ethics did not justify violence being committed against him; it sent its own investigative team to Medan on 28 June, which identified "possible foul play".

== Response ==
Pasaribu's surviving daughter, Eva Meliani Pasaribu, whose son died in the fire, launched a public campaign calling for justice for her family.

Human Rights Watch called on the Indonesian police to complete a "credible and timebound" investigation to identify anyone involved in the attack. It identified similarities between Pasaribu and the deaths of other journalists in Indonesia, including Fuad Muhammad Syafruddin in Bantul Regency in 1996, and Sander Theones in Dili in 1999.

On 12 July, the Director-General of UNESCO, Audrey Azoulay, condemned Pasaribu's killing, and called for a "thorough investigation" to ensure that the perpetrators were brought to justice.

Tempo called on the police to complete a thorough and independent investigation, and highlighted a likely link between Pasaribu's reporting on gambling in the military and his subsequent death. An editorial also raised concerns that local police appeared to be covering up the fire by suggesting it was an accident, citing gasoline and gas cylinders stored in Pasaribu's wife's shop.

== See also ==
- Udin: an Indonesian journalist murdered in 1996.
- Sander Thoenes: a Dutch journalist killed by the Indonesian Army in 1999.
