= Morgan Mellish =

Australian journalist

Henry Morgan Saxon Mellish (14 March 1970 – 7 March 2007), better known as Morgan Mellish, was an Australian journalist.

Mellish was educated at Shore School in North Sydney (1982–1987). He then completed an economics degree at the Australian National University in Canberra and became a journalist with Foodweek, the Australian food industry's trade magazine.

In 1997, Mellish joined the business section of The Sydney Morning Herald as a staff writer. He moved to the Australian Financial Review in 2000, where he was employed as the financial services editor, and later became the chief economics writer based in Canberra. In 2004, he moved back to Sydney as a senior reporter covering business news.

Mellish won a Walkley Award for business journalism in 2006 for a series of articles he wrote in November 2005, which revealed the details of former Reserve Bank of Australia board member Robert Gerard's 14-year battle with the Australian Taxation Office. Mellish revealed details of a Caribbean tax haven deal which resulted in a A$150 million out-of-court settlement for tax evasion and Gerard's resignation from the Reserve Bank of Australia.

In 2006, Mellish also became a foreign correspondent for the Australian Financial Review in Indonesia, based at the publication's Jakarta bureau.

Morgan Mellish was one of 3 Australians, 2 Americans and 16 Indonesians killed when Garuda Indonesia Flight 200 crashed at Yogyakarta airport on 7 March 2007. He was part of an advance party to cover the visit of the Foreign Minister of Australia, Alexander Downer.

On 13 June 2008, the Jakarta Foreign Correspondents Club (JFCC) launched the Morgan Mellish Fund, a scholarship to train Indonesian journalists in business and economics. Australian Prime Minister Kevin Rudd inaugurated the memorial fund during a luncheon at the JW Marriott Hotel.
