= Ahmed Arif =

Turkish poet

Ahmed Arif (21 April 1927 in Siverek – 2 June 1991 in Ankara) was a Turkish-Kurdish poet.

His father, Arif Hikmet, is an ethnic Turkmen from Kirkuk, and his mother Sayre is Kurdish. Ahmed Arif studied philosophy at Ankara University. Arif was arrested on political grounds in 1950 and spent time in prison until 1952. Published in various literary journals, his poems were widely read due to their original lyricism and imagery influenced by Anatolian folk cultures. He published only one collection of poetry: Hasretinden Prangalar Eskittim (Fetters Worn Out by Longing/1968) – a volume that has gone through a record number of printings.

He was among the contributors of the literary magazine Papirüs which was edited by Cemal Süreya.

== Ay Karanlık (The Moon Is Dark) ==
In 2023, the Paris Institute for Critical Thinking (PICT) commenced a project to translate Ahmed Arif's poems into English; so far, 2 open-access translations, both by David Selim Sayers and Evrim Emir-Sayers, have been published online.

Turkish
Maviye
Maviye çalar gözlerin,
Yangın mavisine
Rüzgarda asi,
Körsem,
Senden gayrısına yoksam,
Bozuksam,
Can benim, düş benim,
Ellere nesi?
Hadi gel,
Ay karanlık...

İtten aç,
Yılandan çıplak,
Vurgun ve bela
Gelip durmuşsam kapına
Var mı ki doymazlığım?
İlle de ille
Sevmelerim,
Sevmelerim gibisi?
Oturmuş yazıcılar
Fermanım yazar
N'olur gel,
Ay karanlık...

Dört yanım puşt zulası,
Dost yüzlü,
Dost gülücüklü.
Cıgaramdan yanar,
Alnım öperler,
Suskun, hayın, çıyansı.
Dört yanım puşt zulası,
Dönerim dönerim çıkmaz.
En leylim gecede ölesim tutmuş,
Etme gel,
Ay karanlık...

English
Into the blue
Into the blue hint your eyes
Into the blue of a fire
Raging against the wind
If I’m blind
If I’m leaving behind all but you
So what if I’m through?
This life is mine, this dream is mine
Strangers have no clue
Come, I say,
The moon is dark...

If I end at your gate
Starved as a cur
Stripped as a snake
Wounded and cursed
With my loving, my need
My insatiable greed
What, then, could compete?
Come what may
The scribes all unite
My sentence to write
Come, I pray,
The moon is dark...

Bastards’ lairs to all my sides
They look like friends
Smile like friends
Light their cigarettes off mine
Kiss my cheek
Like worms they sneak
Bastards’ lairs to all my sides
To all my sides, dead ends
Craving for death in the leyliest night,
Don’t stay away,
The moon is dark...

== See also ==
- Ahmet Arif Literature Museum Library
