= Marcel Gaumont =

French sculptor (1880-1962)

- Born: Armand Marcel Gaumont; 27 January 1880; Tours, France
- Died: 20 November 1962 (aged 82); Paris, France
- Education: École nationale supérieure des beaux-arts
- Occupation: Sculptor

Marcel Gaumont (27 January 1880, Tours—20 November 1962, Paris) was a French sculptor.

== Biography ==
Gaumont was a pupil at the École nationale supérieure des Beaux-Arts in Paris and studied under Louis-Ernest Barrias, François-Léon Sicard and Jules Coutan. He submitted Figure modelée d'après l'antique to the school's 1900 competition for a "figure modelée" in the classical mode. While a student, he also made Psyché, a marble Ronde-bosse. He was the joint winner of the 1908 Prix de Rome for his plaster composition Le jeune Sophocle après la victoire de Salamine, along with Camille Crenier, and this took him to Rome's Villa Médicis from 1909 to 1912. Salamine is kept in the archives at the École nationale. From 1920 onwards Gaumont often collaborated with Manufacture nationale de Sèvres. One such work in "biscuit de porcelaine" was called "Petit coursier". Other works with Sèvres include Joueuses de Boules, La mort de Narcisse, Samson et Dalila, Le sommeil, Enfants a la flèche and L'amour Endormi.

He exhibited regularly at the Société des Artistes Français and in 1935 won their gold medal. In 1937 his four Metopes won the major prize at the Exposition internationale de Paris. These works had decorated the western façade of the Palais de Tokyo at that exhibition. In 1938 he was made an officer of the "Légion d'honneur". In 1939 he became professor at the École des Beaux-Arts in Paris and in 1944 he was elected to the French Académie des Beaux-Arts taking the chair vacated by Paul Gasq.

== Selected works ==
=== Churches and cathedrals ===
- 1920: Arras Cathedral - The cathedral was restored in 1920 after damage sustained in World War I. Inside, a pulpit has sculptural decoration by Gaumont, who depicts Christ amongst his disciples and the four evangelists: the winged Matthew, Mark with a lion, Luke with a winged bull and John with an eagle. Gaumont also added the sculptures on the baptismal font. He depicts Jesus being baptized by John the Baptist and St Vaast blessing a group of the faithful.
- 1922: The Cambrai Belfry - The belfry was the only part of the church of Saint-Martin to survive damage from the French Revolution. In 1922, Gaumont was commissioned to add four sculptures to the corners of the belfry tower depicting figures from Cambrai history: a Frankish warrior, a soldier of the militia, Louise de Savoie, and the Marquis de Cézen, the first governor after Cambrai was reunited with France in 1667.
- 1923-1926: Église Saint-Géry in Flesquières - The village of Flesquières was razed by the Germans in 1918 and architect Pierre Leprince Ringuet was commissioned to plan the reconstruction. The rebuilding of the church was started in 1923 and the building consecrated in 1926. Gaumont carried out sculptural work both inside and outside the church.
- 1928: Église Saint-Joseph de la Vacquerie in Villers-Plouich - This chapel was erected following the destruction of the church on the eve of the Battle of Cambrai. Building took place between 1923 and 1930, and Gaumont built a sculpture around the church's rose window "Christ in majesty," surrounded by angels.
- 1928: Église Saint-Quentin de Villers-Plouich - In June 1928, Gaumont added a depiction of the Crucifixion to the front of the church when it was rebuilt following the Battle of Cambrai.
- The tomb of Albert Roussel in the cemetery of the Sainte-Valérie church in Varengeville-sur-mer
- Église Saint-Martin d'Abancourt - Gaumont executed sculpture in moulded cement ("béton moulé") for the church façade.
- Saint-Martin's church in Masnières - This is one of the five churches restored by Pierre Leprince-Ringuet and Gaumont created several sculptural works including the pediment depicting St Martin handing his cloak to a beggar.

=== War memorials ===
- 1914: Memorial to the 88th Regiment Indre-et-Loire - Inaugurated on 12 July 1914, this monument in Tours is dedicated to the 88th régiment de mobiles and their role in the Franco-Prussian War. Gaumont sculpted in limestone a soldier protecting a woman who, in turn, guards the coat of arms of Tours. Behind them another soldier lies either dying or wounded. The monument is positioned just before the Saint-Symphorien bridge. Originally the monument stood in Tours's Place du Chardonnet. The architect was Bernard Chaussemiche.
- 1920: Le Perreux-sur-Marne War Memorial - Built in 1920 and inaugurated on 19 June 1921, this statue was built from limestone.
- 1923: The Sorigny War Memorial - Dating to 1923, Gaumont's sculpture for this memorial, given by Gaumont as a gift to a commune where he had spent much of his infant life, depicts an angel of victory with wings spread wide supporting the body of a dead soldier. The architect of the memorial was Maurice Boille.
- 1923: Le Monument de la rue Conté in Châtenay-Malabry - Gaumont carried out a sculpture at the entrance to École Centrale Paris, which lost 550 students during World War I.
- 1925: Fontainebleau War Memorial - This 1925 memorial dedicated to "aux morts de l’artillerie et des trains des équipages" was designed by Pierre Leprince Ringuet with sculpture by Gaumont. Originally located in the Fontainebleau School of Artillery, it is now held in the Musée de d’Artillerie in Draguignan.
- 1926: Laon War Memorial - Inaugurated in 1926, the memorial lies at the intersection of the rue du Mont de Vaux, the Avenue Gambetta and the avenue Aristide Briand and stands 17 metres (56 ft) high. It is made from reinforced concrete and Lavoux stone. Gaumont sculpted an image of Minerva carrying a shield and a sword, which she points downwards.
- The Lycée Saint-Louis War Memorial - Gaumont carried out sculptural work for this memorial to the pupils of the Lycée killed in World War I.
- Tours War Memorial - This memorial is located in the Hôtel de Ville, Tours. It stands at the side of the "Escalier d'honneur".
- Le Blanc War Memorial - Created by Gaumont and architect Pierre Leprince Ringuet.

=== Other ===
- 1925: Le Printemps - This statuette in plaster was commissioned from Gaumont by the architect Albert Laprade for the bathroom of the "Studium" pavilion at the 1925 International Exhibition of Modern Decorative and Industrial Arts. It is held in the collection of the Musée Antoine-Lécuyer in Saint-Quentin.
- 1926: Daphnis et Chloé - This composition in Bourgogne stone is held by the Musée des Beaux-Arts de Tours.
- 1935: Statue of Pierre Belain d'Esnambuc - Inaugurated on 15 September 1935, this collaboration with architect Pierre Leprince Ringuet stood at Fort-de-France in Martinique until 2020.
- 1937: Four bas-relief sculptures for the 1937 Exposition Internationale des Arts et Techniques dans la Vie Moderne - Gaumont executed four bas-reliefs, Triton, Trois Nymphes, Centaure and Eros, for the exhibition. They now decorate the exterior wall of the Musée d'Art Moderne de la Ville de Paris.
- Fondation Biermans-Lapôtre building at the Cité Internationale Universitaire de Paris - Gaumont created reliefs on the building's entrance in the style of various countries. The Fondation Biermans-Lapôtre building itself is that built in the Flemish style and mainly housed students from Belgium.
- Cambrai Chamber of Commerce - When it was rebuilt following its destruction by the Germans in 1918, the building was decorated with art by Gaumont and Paul Simon.
