= Pinaki Bhattacharya =

Paris-based Bangladeshi blogger and social activist

- পিনাকী ভট্টাচার্য
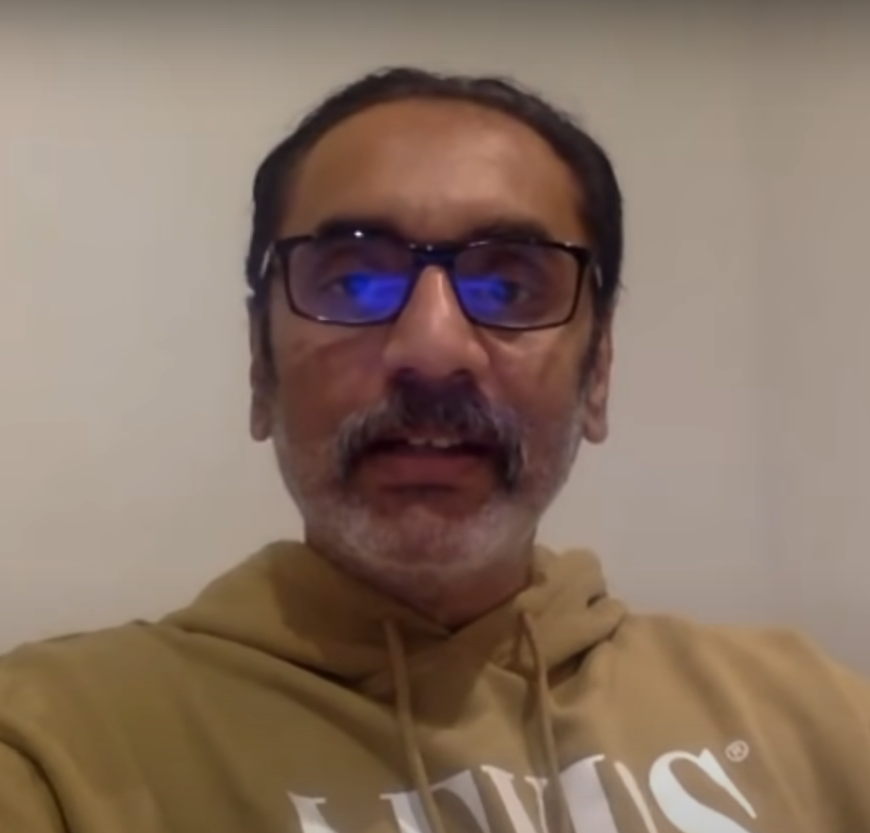
- Bhattacharya in 2020
- Born: 1 March 1967 (age 59); Bogra District, East Pakistan, Pakistan
- Citizenship: Pakistan (1967-1971); Bangladesh (from 1971); France (from 2013)
- Education: Bogura Zilla School; Azizul Haque College; Rajshahi Medical College; Sorbonne Business School
- Occupations: Activist; Physician; Writer
- Political party: BSU (former); CPB (former)
- Movement: ʼ90's Anti-Authoritarian Movement; 2018 Bangladesh road-safety protests; July Uprising
- Children: 1

YouTube information
- Channel: Pinaki Bhattacharya
- Years active: 20 March 2013–present
- Genre: Activism
- Subscribers: 4.31 million
- Views: 1.00 billion
- Last updated: 5 Aug 2026
- Website: pbhattacharya.com

Pinaki Bhattacharya (Bengali: পিনাকী ভট্টাচার্য; born 1 March 1967) is a France-based Bangladeshi activist and physician known for his criticism of Sheikh Hasina, Awami League and BNP. (Note: Multiple references:) His views align with the 11 Party Alliance, and during the 2026 Bangladeshi general election, he actively campaigned on social media in support of Jamaat–NCP alliance. He pioneered a strong 'India Out' campaign - a social media movement blaming India of interfering in Bangladesh’s 2024 general elections to keep fascist Hasina regime in power.

== Early life ==
Bhattacharya was born in a Bengali Hindu family in the Bogra District of East Pakistan in 1967. His father, Shyamol Bhattacharya, worked as a school teacher at Bogura Zilla School and was also involved in local cultural activities, while his mother Sukriti Bhattacharya was a housewife. Bhattacharya is the elder son and has one brother and one sister.

== Education ==
Bhattacharya completed his SSC from Bogura Zilla School and HSC from Government Azizul Haque College. Later he studied medicine at Rajshahi Medical College between 1985 and 1992, graduating in 1992. Although he holds an MBBS degree, questions have often been raised about his professional credibility. He later pursued an MBA from IAE Paris Sorbonne Business School and currently claims to be working on a PhD in sustainability.

In October 2026, Bhattacharya received a PhD from the International School of Management. His dissertation was titled Sovereign Accumulation: How China Sustains Capitalism Without a Bourgeoisie. Professor Tobias de Coning as his supervisor.

== Career ==
Bhattacharya is best known as a social activist. He is based in Paris, working for L'Oréal. He is also a marketing professional at a French multinational company. He was an adjunct faculty at American International University-Bangladesh.

== Politics ==
Bhattacharya was once involved in leftist politics, being a former member of the Communist Party of Bangladesh. When he was a student at Rajshahi Medical College, he was a local leader of Bangladesh Students' Union and joined the mass uprising which overthrew Ershad's regime in December 1990. Bhattacharya has criticized the Awami League regime's corruption, human rights violations, kidnappings, and extrajudicial killings. His posts and tweets are often critical of Bangladesh's previously ruling party, the Awami League. He sought political asylum in France.

== Activism ==
Bhattacharya is a well-known activist. He has millions of followers on social media. During the 2018 Bangladesh road-safety protests, photographer Shahidul Alam was arrested by the police for his participation. At the same time, DGFI intelligence officers asked Bhattacharya to go to DGFI headquarters in Dhaka. They did not explain why he was called to appear there. There are instances where intelligence officers summon dissidents to their offices, many of whom have disappeared after meeting with intelligence. Bhattacharya later went into hiding to avoid capture and intelligence officials raided his residence and office several times and kept his residence under surveillance.

While he was hiding, authorities banned him from leaving the country, but he was able to leave with the help of friends and reached Bangkok, Thailand in January 2019, and two months later, he reached France, where he is currently under political asylum. On 15 November 2022, CTTC sued Bhattacharya under the jurisdiction of the Digital Security Act, 2018. According to the case statement, CTTC noticed a Facebook post by Bhattacharya on 14 October through which ‘misinformation about police was spread on social media’. On 31 October 2024, Dhaka court cyber tribunal judge Noor-e-Alam acquitted Pinaki Bhattacharya on a case filed under the Digital Security Act.

He became popular for his role in the "India out" campaign in Bangladesh.

Bhattacharya told Deutsche Welle the following:

A striking example of such interference was the mockery of democracy seen in the January 7 elections, where India's involvement was pivotal in upholding a regime that blatantly favors India's strategic, political, and economic agendas.

In April, he strongly opposed the controversial reform proposal by Women's Affair and Reform Commission.

== Controversies and legal issues ==
=== Digital Security Act case ===
In November 2022, Bhattacharya was sued under the Digital Security Act of Bangladesh for allegedly spreading misinformation and defaming the state after a Facebook post about a police operation on 14 October. The complaint was filed by the Counter Terrorism and Transnational Crime (CTTC) unit of the Dhaka Metropolitan Police. In October 2024, a Dhaka cyber tribunal later exempted him in the case.

=== Threat to actor Mosharraf Karim ===
In February 2024, media reports alleged that Bhattacharya allegedly threatened Bangladeshi actor Mosharraf Karim, urging him not to participate in the promotion of the film Hubba, directed by Bratya Basu and released on Indian OTT platforms such as Hoichoi.

=== Claim on NID website ===
In May 2024, Bhattacharya was criticized for spreading a false claim suggesting that the Bangladesh Election Commission’s NID wing website displayed service fees in Indian rupees instead of Bangladeshi takas. Rumor Scanner later confirmed that the claim was false.

=== Dhanmondi 32 demolition ===
In February 2025, Bhattacharya posted on Facebook in support of the demolition of Dhanmondi 32 of the former residence of Bangladesh's founder President Sheikh Mujibur Rahman at Dhanmondi 32 a historic house which was later used as the Bangabandhu Memorial Museum, during protests in Dhaka. News reports described his post as encouraging the ongoing ‘bulldozer’ mobilisation targeting the site.

== Personal life ==
Bhattacharya married his former classmate, Anjuman Ara Begum, at Rajshahi Medical College, and they have a son named Rosef Anjuman Shuvo. His wife is a doctor with FCPS qualification.

== Publications ==
- Bhattacharya, Pinaki (2025). Sayers, David (ed.). Fulkumari: The Tale of a Refugee and a Rat in Pandemic Paris (1st ed.). Paris Institute for Critical Thinking. p. 148. ISBN 9782494635128.
- Bhattacharya, Pinaki (2021). স্বাধীনতা-উত্তর বাংলাদেশ (in Bengali). Independent Publishing Ne. ISBN 978-1-83853-688-6.
- Bhattacharya, Pinaki (2021). মেডিক্যাল রিপ্রেজেন্টেটিভ : সাফল্যর তত্ত্ব তালাশ (in Bengali). Bhashachitra.
- Bhattacharya, Pinaki (2020). মুক্তিযুদ্ধ, ধর্ম, রাজনীতি ও অন্যান্য প্রসঙ্গ (in Bengali). Adarsha. ASIN B089S5PCPZ.
- Bhattacharya, Pinaki (2020). Sino-US and Indo-US Relations: Contrasts and Commonalities. Palgrave Macmillan. ISBN 9789811372759.
- Bhattacharya, Pinaki (2019). মার্কিন ডকুমেন্টে বাংলাদেশের মুক্তিযুদ্ধ ৭১ (in Bengali). Sucheepatra. ISBN 978-9849213079.
- Bhattacharya, Pinaki (2019). এনলাইটেনমেন্ট থেকে পোস্ট মর্ডানিজম : চিন্তার অভিযাত্রা (in Bengali). ISBN 9789848034217.
- Bhattacharya, Pinaki (2019). Itihasera dhulokali ইতিহাসের ধুলোকালি (in Bengali). Guardian Publications. ISBN 9789848254042.
- Bhattacharya, Pinaki (2018). মন ভ্রমরের কাজল পাখায়: পশ্চিমা চিত্রকলার সমঝদারির হাতেখড়ি (in Bengali). Baatighar.
- Bhattacharya, Pinaki (2018). খানাতল্লাশি (in Bengali). Ananda Publishers Pvt. Ltd. ISBN 9789350409381.
- Bhattacharya, Pinaki (2017). মুক্তিযুদ্ধের বয়ানে ইসলাম (in Bengali). Gurdian Publications. ISBN 978-9849295976.
- Bhattacharya, Pinaki (2017). ভারতীয় দর্শনের মজার পাঠ (in Bengali). Baatighar. ASIN B0DMC69RKM.
- Bhattacharya, Pinaki (2016). রবি বাবুর ডাক্তারি (in Bengali). ISBN 978-9849182948.
- Bhattacharya, Pinaki (2016). ধর্ম ও নাস্তিকতা বিষয়ে বাঙালি কমিউনিস্টদের ভ্রান্তিপর্ব (in Bengali). Bhashachitra. ISBN 978-9849208297.
- Bhattacharya, Pinaki (2016). সোনার বাঙলার রূপালী কথা (in Bengali). Baatighar. ASIN B0DMC22946.
- Bhattacharya, Pinaki (2015). রবীন্দ্রনাথ : অন্য আলোয় ঈশ্বর আত্মা কারণ (in Bengali). ISBN 9789849133476.
- Bhattacharya, Pinaki (2013). ওয়েদার মেকার (in Bengali). Dibya Prakash. ISBN 9789848830604.
- Bhattacharya, Pinaki (2009). বালাই ষাট (in Bengali). Bhashachitra. ASIN B0DN1DT2CY.

== See also ==
- 1990 Bangladesh mass uprising
- 2018 Bangladesh road-safety protests
- July Revolution
