= Freedom of Speech Award =

Journalism award

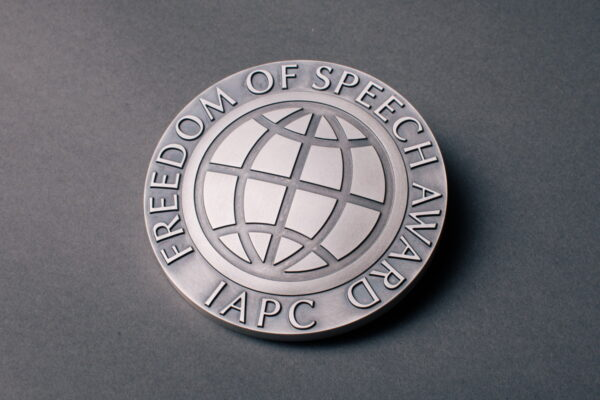
- Awarded for: Exceptional contributions to the fight for or in defence of free speech
- Country: Poland
- Presented by: International Association of Press Clubs
- First award: 2013
- Website: freedomofspeechaward.org

The Freedom of Speech Award honors persons or organisations for their exceptional contributions to the fight for or in defence of free speech, or creating conditions and supporting efforts promoting freedom of speech.

The winner is selected by all the International Association of Press Clubs member press clubs from over 30 countries. The winner receives a medal of freedom of speech.

Every year laureates are honored at a gala dinner in Warsaw, Poland and given an award.

The first award was given on June, 4th 2013 to organization Reporters Without Borders and the award ceremony was attended by the Nobel Peace Prize winner Lech Wałęsa.

== Laureates ==
This list includes the recipients of the award as recorded at the official IAPC website.

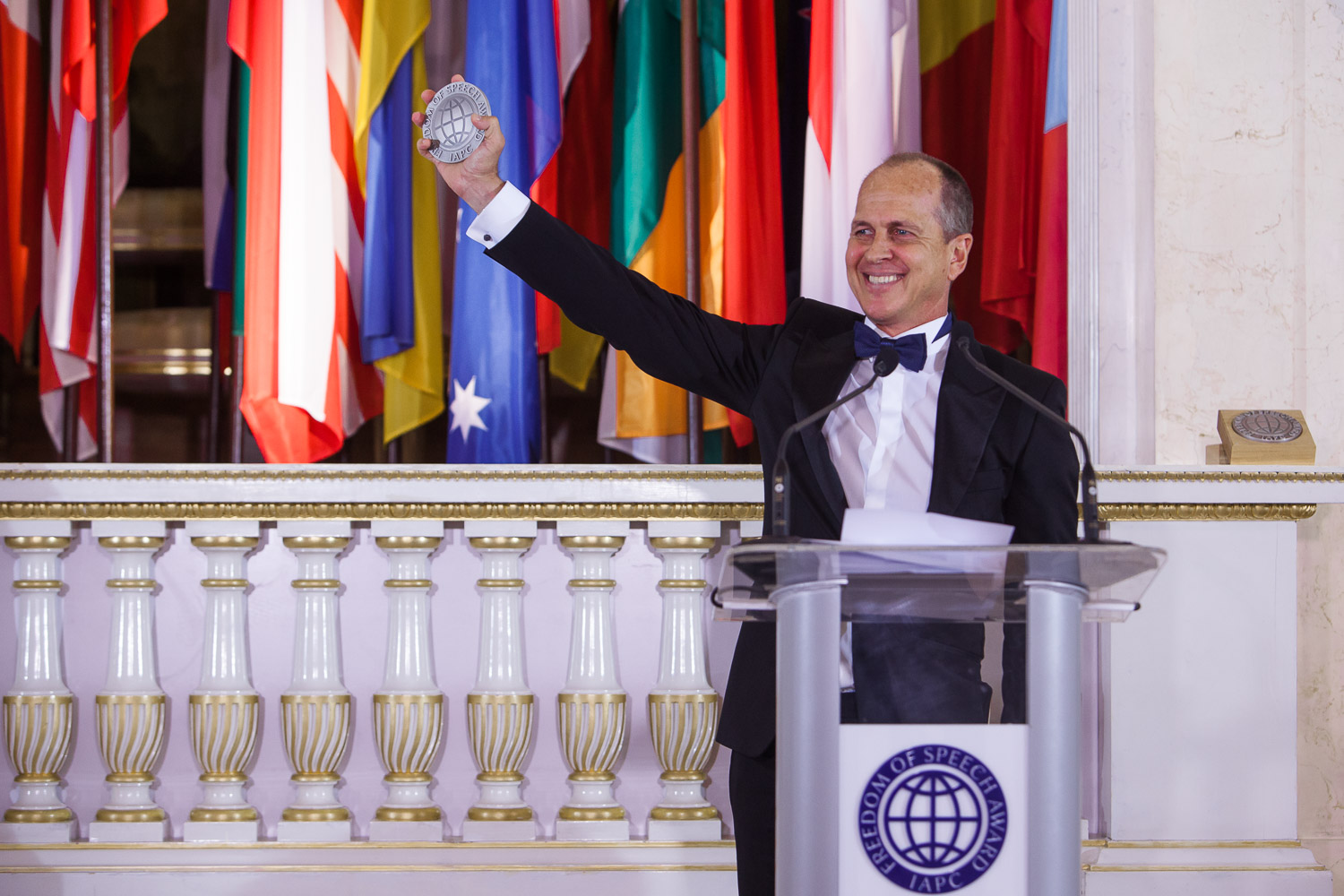
Peter Greste accepts the 2015 IAPC Freedom of Speech Award

- 2024 Information Resistance, Ukraine
- 2023 Andrzej Poczobut, Belarus and Mortaza Behboudi, France
- 2022 Cheng Lei, Australia
- 2021 Yuliya Slutskaya, Belarus,
- 2019 The Washington Post and Fred Ryan, United States
- 2018 The Guardian, United Kingdom
- 2017 Independent Turkish journalists
- 2015 Peter Greste, Mohamed Fahmy and Baher Mohamed, Australia and Egypt
- 2014 Aleksey Simonov, Russia
- 2013 Reporters Without Borders, France
