= Sander Thoenes =

Dutch journalist

- Born: 7 November 1968; Enschede, Netherlands
- Died: 21 September 1999 (aged 30); Dili, East Timor
- Cause of death: Execution by shooting
- Occupations: Broadcaster, journalist
- Years active: 1992–1999

Sander Thoenes (November 7, 1968 – September 21, 1999) was a Dutch journalist who was killed, near Dili in East Timor, by soldiers of the Indonesian army. He was shot when their paths crossed on a road as the Indonesians withdrew from the territory.

== Early life ==
Thoenes was born in Enschede, the Netherlands, the youngest of three brothers. He was educated at Gymnasium St. Jacobus college in Enschede (1981–1987) and studied English literature and modern Russian history at Hampshire College in Amherst, Massachusetts, United States (1987–1992). During his time at Hampshire college Thoenes learned to fluently speak and write Russian.

== Career ==
After studying for his journalism career at the Centre for Investigative Reporting in San Francisco he moved to Moscow in August, 1992. Here Thoenes worked for the English language paper Moscow Times. He went on to write for the Dutch weekly Vrij Nederland and served as correspondent for U.S. News & World Report, where he reported from Chechnya in 1995.

In 1996 he relocated to Almaty, Kazakhstan and covered Central Asia, including Uzbekistan, Turkmenistan and Afghanistan for the Financial Times. In September, 1997 he moved to Jakarta, Indonesia, still working as a correspondent for the Financial Times. There he reported the Asian Financial Crisis and the fall of President Suharto.

== Death ==
On September 21, 1999, Thoenes was killed by soldiers from a company of the Indonesian Army's Battalion 745 as the unit withdrew from the territory, carrying out a deliberate, government-directed, scorched-earth policy as it went. These murders were just one in a string of similar incidents that marked the passage of the unit westward along the coast-road toward the Indonesian border. Thoenes was riding pillion on a local motorcycle taxi in the neighborhood of Becora, just east of Dili, when he encountered the column of motor-cyclists and heavy lorries as it approached Dili from the opposite direction. Australian-led UN peace-keepers discovered Thoenes’ body with gunshot-wounds in the back-yard of a house on a side-road. It was concluded Thoenes had been moved off the road to delay his being found and that he had also been shot at close range, with deliberation. Florindo Araujo, Thoenes' motorcycle taxi driver, told reporters that he was stopped by at least six men wearing gray Indonesian police uniforms at a roadblock while en route to Becora. Araujo and Thoenes sought to flee. Araujo managed to reach cover in the bush nearby and hide. He witnessed the execution of the injured Thoenes at the road-side. Two Indonesian army officers, Lt. Camilo dos Santos and Maj. Jacob Djoko Sarosa, were later blamed for his murder by a UN special investigator.

Thoenes' death marked the first time a foreign reporter was killed in East Timor since 1975. In 2000, he received a posthumous press freedom award from the Washington D.C.–based National Press Club (NPC).

The incident was the subject of a documentary, broadcast in October 2013, by fellow Dutch journalist Step Vaessen. On September 21, 1999, Vaessen was reporting from central Dili, together with her husband Andries, for Nederlandse Omroep Stichting. She still works in the region, now as the Jakarta correspondent for international broadcaster Al Jazeera English. The film was part of the Al Jazeera Correspondent series and featured an interview by the veteran South-East Asia journalist Jon Swain, who narrowly avoided the same fate later that day, nearby on the same road. Vaessen interviewed General Wiranto, the overall Indonesian military commander at the time and former Presidential candidate, and BJ Habibie the President of Indonesia in 1999. The General suggested that the military had to obey government policy, whilst the President suggested he had no personal responsibility for the military's actions. The international community tends to indict only those who are already disowned.

== Legacy ==
The Financial Times set up the Sander Thoenes Prize in his honour. The award offers recent journalism graduates, each year, a three-month internship at the Financial Times headquarters in London and a scholarship to cover living expenses.

The Jakarta Foreign Correspondents Club (JFCC) announced a scholarship fund in his honor on September 7, 2006. The annual JFCC scholarship is awarded to support the training of East Timorese journalists.

Hampshire College, Thoenes' alma mater in Amherst MA. has the Sander Thoenes research awards. Awards are made from an endowment established by his friends from Hampshire and around the world. The award is given to Division III students working in journalism; documentary photography, film or video; international relations; globalization; peace-building; civil society and human rights.

== See also ==
- Udin: an Indonesian journalist murdered in 1996
- Rico Sempurna Pasaribu: an Indonesian journalist killed in 2024
