= Fondation Biermans-Lapôtre =

Coordinates: 48.8195°N 2.3408°E

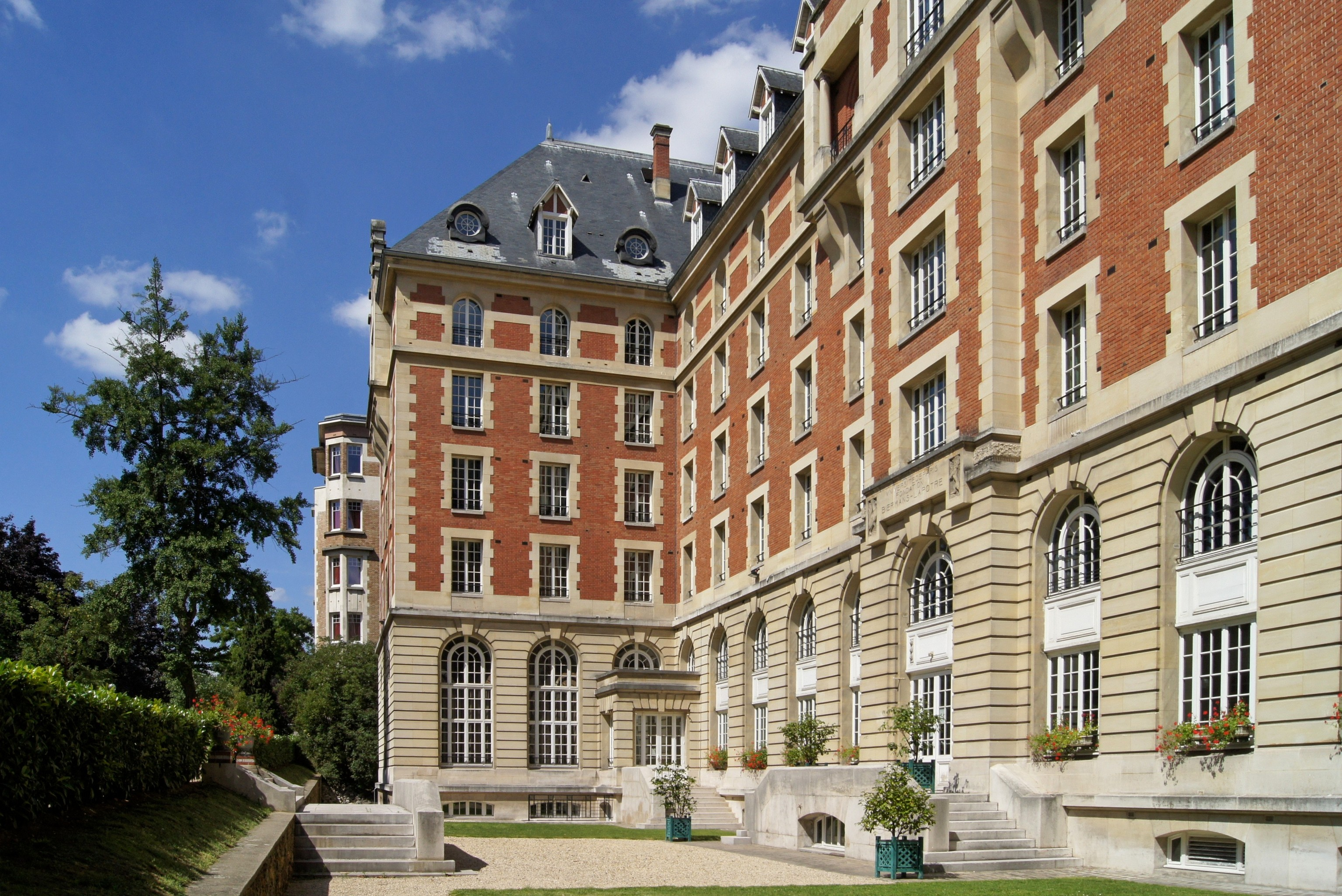

The Fondation Biermans-Lapôtre is a university residence that is part of the Cité international universitaire de Paris, located in the 14th arrondissement of Paris, near Parc Montsouris. It is the first foreign house decided on the site of the Cité Internationale universitaire de Paris. The residence primarily accommodates graduate students from Belgium and Luxembourg who are pursuing their studies in Paris, but students of other nationalities also live there as a part of the Cité's commitment to international exchange.

Jean Hubert Biermans and his wife Berthe Lapôtre funded the construction of the residence, which was completed in 1927. It was renovated in 2000.

Armand Guéritte was the architect of the Fondation Biermans-Lapôtre, as well as the Maison des Provinces de France. Marcel Gaumont designed the literature and science themed bas-relief entrance and Edgar Brandt made the gate. There are also frescoes depicting important locations in Belgium by René Gaucher inside the building.

== Famous former residents ==
- Jean-Louis Curtis, French writer.
- Gilles Dal, Belgian writer and comedian.
- Francis Delprée, jurist and politician.
- François Englert, winner of the Nobel Prize in physics.
- Olivier Gourmet, actor.
- Michel Hansenne, Belgian politician.
- Hervé Hasquin, historian and politician.
- Maurice Olender, historian.
- Viviane Reding, Luxembourg politician.
- Philippe Roberts-Jones, art historian.
- Jacques Santer, former president of the European Commission.
- André de Staercke, Belgian politician and diplomat.
- Peter Moors, Belgian diplomat.
- Charline Vanhoenacker, Belgian journalist and comedian.
- David Van Reybrouck, Belgian writer.
- Pierre Werner, Luxembourg politician.
