= Foreign Correspondents Club of Malaysia =

Non-profit organization in Malaysia

- Formation: 2011
- Founder: unknown
- Headquarters: Kuala Lumpur, Malaysia
- President: Norman Goh
- Vice President: Hadi Azmi
- Secretary: Anisah Shukry
- Treasurer: Henry Berbar
- Website: www.fccm.my

The Foreign Correspondents Club of Malaysia (FCCM) is a non-profit organization in Malaysia. It was established in 2011 to aid foreign correspondents working in Malaysia. FCCM is a member of the Asia-Pacific Association of Press Clubs, and is currently serving as the Association's first vice-president. FCCM's main focus is to improve the working environment of journalists working for foreign-based news organizations, which includes negotiation for better access to government events, as well as sharing important information.

FCCM organizes regular briefings, debates, and other activities.

== History ==
Luke Hunt, in The Diplomat, reported that the club's first president, Romen Bose of Agence France-Presse, said:

The idea of a foreign correspondents club in Malaysia isn't new in that several groups had tried over the years to get one set up, and many had gone as far as having initial meetings and an executive committee drawn up, but were unable to get permission from the authorities. The last time a group of journalists tried to set one up was in 1992 when then AFP bureau chief Mervin Nambiar and a group of very senior correspondents had banded together to push for the club to be set up, but the powers that be refused to allow its formation.

== See also ==
- International Association of Press Clubs
