= Taiwan Foreign Correspondents' Club =

- 台灣外國記者會
- Formation: 1998; 28 years ago
- Key people: Thompson Chau (president)

The Taiwan Foreign Correspondents Club (TFCC; Chinese: 台灣外國記者會) is an organization of foreign media in Taiwan. Founded in 1998, the TFCC organizes panel discussion, networking sessions and high-level briefings with Taiwanese politicians and journalists.

Thompson Chau, who covers Myanmar, Taiwan and Asia for Nikkei Asia, serves as the club's president.

== History ==
On 10 May 2024, the TFCC hosted the award ceremony for the 2024 Human Rights Press Awards for Asia. Taiwanese President Tsai Ing-wen was the event's keynote speaker, and praised the country's role as a hub for international media.

"As the result of our work on safeguarding freedom, Taiwan is now an important hub for international media," Tsai said. As of last month, Taiwan was home to 176 correspondents from 86 media outlets originating in 22 countries, roughly double the figure from 2016, she said at the event.
