= Jakarta Foreign Correspondents Club =

Indonesian non-profit organization

- Key people: Georg Matthes (co-president); Wahyudi Soeriaatmadja (co-president)

The Jakarta Foreign Correspondents Club (JFCC) is a non-profit organization for international journalists in Indonesia.

As of July 2023, JFCC has more than 400 journalist and associate members. Its members include foreign journalists, Indonesian journalists, diplomats, analysts, business people and corporations. JFCC regularly hosts speakers and public forums on issues of interest to international media, as well as informal social events.

The club has met in several different venues over the past 40 years, including the Hotel Indonesia, The Sari Pan Pacific, The Mandarin Oriental Hotel, and the Intercontinental Hotel.

JFCC awards three annual scholarships, the Sander Thoenes, and Morgan Mellish funds, each in remembrance of former members who died during the course of their work.

== History ==
The club was founded as the Djakarta Foreign Correspondents Club (DFCC) from mid-1965 to 1972, and in 1973 named the Jakarta Foreign Correspondents Club (JFCC).

In December 2009, the JFCC cancelled a private screening of the film Balibo, which depicts the deaths of six foreign journalists in East Timor. The film was banned by Indonesia's Film Censorship Agency.
