= Murder of Udin =

1996 murder of an Indonesian journalist

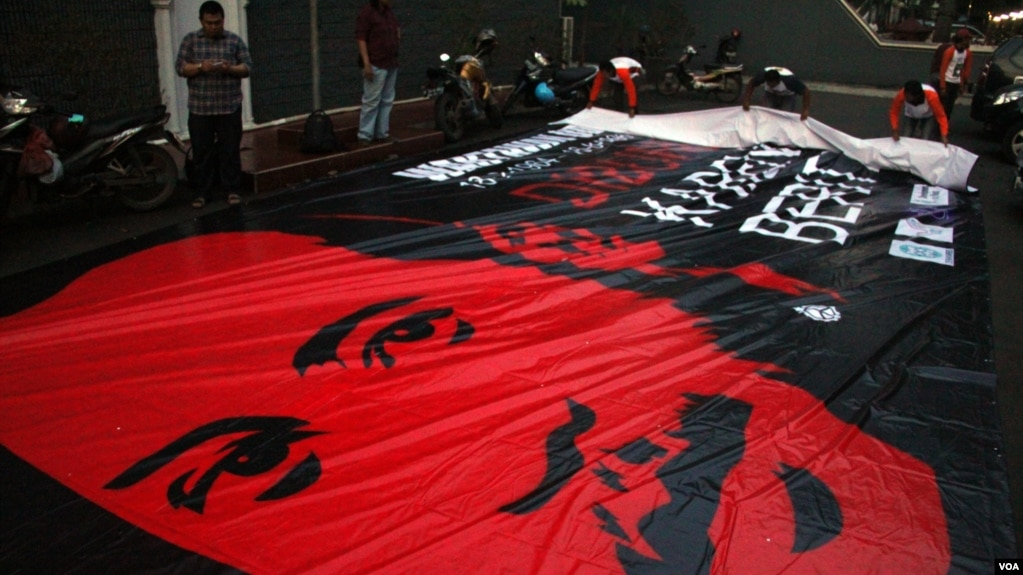
A banner commemorating Udin (c. 2018)

Fuad Muhammad Syafruddin (18 February 1963 – 16 August 1996), best known by his pen name Udin, was an Indonesian journalist who was murdered in 1996. A reporter at the Yogyakarta daily newspaper Bernas, he published a series of articles on corruption in the Bantul Regency in the months before his death. On 13 August, he was attacked at his house by two unidentified assailants using a metal rod and taken to the hospital. He died three days later without regaining consciousness.

His murder became a national cause célèbre. Several independent inquiries concluded that local government officials had been involved. However, the Bantul police early on discounted a political motive. Instead, they arrested a local driver named Dwi Sumaji for the murder, alleging a motive of jealousy. Sumaji was later acquitted after the prosecution withdrew its case owing to a lack of evidence. The police in turn were successfully sued for their mishandling of the case and deliberate destruction of evidence. The murder has never been solved, and is expected to be unprosecutable after 2014 due to Indonesia's 18-year statute of limitations on murder.

== Early life ==
Udin was born on 18 February 1963, a date considered unlucky in the Javanese calendar as it fell on a kliwon Monday. His father was Wagiman Dzuchoti, a mosque watchman, and his mother was Mujiah; Udin had five siblings. As a young man, Udin had wanted to join the Indonesian military, but was unable due to his family's lack of political connections. Instead, he worked various manual labour jobs, including stonemason.

== Journalism ==
In the ten years prior to his death, Udin was a freelance reporter for Bernas, a daily newspaper of Yogyakarta, then owned by the Kompas Gramedia Group. He was known for writing about crime and local politics, and would also take pictures to illustrate his articles. Aside from his reporting, Udin and his wife Marsiyem owned a small store which developed pictures and sold stationery; Marsiyem would usually manage the store.

In 1996, Udin began a series of articles reporting on corruption in the regency of Bantul, a suburb of Yogyakarta, focusing particularly on the activities of Bantul's regent Colonel Sri Roso Sudarmo. In one report, Udin stated that Sudarmo had paid a bribe of Rp. 1 billion (US$111,000) to President Suharto's Dharmais Foundation to secure his reappointment that year. Udin also reported that Sudarmo had demanded that village heads guarantee a "200 per cent" victory for Golkar (President Suharto's party) in the upcoming legislative elections.

Following the publication of these articles, Udin began to complain of what he considered a campaign of official harassment. Some district officials had reportedly spoken to him about his writings, and others had threatened him with a libel action. As a result of this perceived harassment, Udin had filed multiple complaints with the Legal Aid Institute (Lembaga Bantuan Hukum) in Yogyakarta. Udin had also been offered bribes to cease his reporting and received threats of violence. When his wife asked him about the threats, he responded, "What I write is the facts. If I have to die, I will accept it." The night of his murder, two men came to the Bernas office looking for him, but a secretary sent them away.

== Murder ==
On 13 August 1996 at around 10:30 pm local time (UTC+7), Udin received two visitors outside his home in Bantul, off Parangtritis Road. The visitors claimed to want to leave a motorcycle with him for safekeeping, and reportedly had come the day before as well. While his wife Marsiyem was preparing tea, the men attacked him with a metal rod, striking him in the head and stomach. The assailants then escaped on a motorcycle they had parked in front of his home. Marsiyem found Udin unconscious on the ground, bleeding from his ears.

With the help of six youths passing in a jeep and a neighbour, Marsiyem took Udin to a small hospital nearby. The hospital was not equipped to treat Udin's wounds, so he was transferred to Bethesda Hospital, a Protestant institution in Yogyakarta. In a coma, he was diagnosed with a fractured skull; a shard of bone had also punctured his skull.

Initially, coverage of the assault in Bernas was slow. The murder had occurred too late in the evening to be covered in the 14 August edition, and head editor Kusfandhi – due to press censorship – was uncomfortable with covering a politically charged case. However, other staff members convinced him to give greater coverage, and the front page of the 15 August edition showed Udin covered in bandages and gave detailed information about the case. On 16 August, Udin died without having regained consciousness; on the morning of his death, a breathing tube had been inserted.

After his death, Udin's body was autopsied then brought to the Bernas office for a quick memorial service, in which the staff sang "Gugur Bunga" ("Fallen Flowers"). The following day, Udin was buried in a small cemetery in Trirenggo, Bantul; his burial attracted 2,000 people. Udin was survived by his wife Marsiyem and two children, Krisna and Wikan.

== Investigation and cause célèbre ==
A Bernas sketch of the murderer, based on a description by Marsiyem

Investigation into the assault began even before Udin's death. The police began their investigation on 13 August, but were hampered as the crime scene had been contaminated during the commotion after the assault. Under the command of Sergeant Major Edy Wuryanto, the police began by collecting Udin's notes and blood from his family; the family had received several bags of blood from Bethesda and were planning to bury it with the body.

Meanwhile, five members of the Indonesian Journalists Association (PWI) formed a fact-finding team on 14 August under the leadership of Putut Wiryawan and Asril Sutan. The team read the articles written by Udin in the previous six months, looking for any coverage which could have led to the attack; they concluded that most of his articles could have been a trigger. The committee eventually focused on the bribery allegations against Sudarmo, as those were the only ones exclusively covered in Bernas, as well as a case of election rigging. Another team, from Bernas, known as the "White Kijang" team for the type of car they drove, investigated the case independently when the PWI team failed to share the information they had gathered.

Udin's death swiftly became a national cause célèbre, with the circumstances of his death and the resulting investigation covered extensively in national media. Muslim prayer services held by Bernas seven days after Udin's death attracted hundreds of mourners and saw several community leaders give speeches on politics and Udin's death. Others, such as Goenawan Mohamad, wrote poems and flowery obituaries.

Though police ruled out Udin's political reporting as a motive in the early stages of the investigation, many reports focused on the theory that his killing had been related to his reporting on Sudarmo. One journalist quoted the regent as having said shortly before the murder that he would like to teach Udin "a lesson". The police focused instead on allegations of infidelity; in late August the police stated that Udin had been murdered by a jealous husband as a result of an extramarital affair with a woman named Tri Sumaryani, a Citizens Band radio enthusiast who had once dated Udin's younger brother. However, Sumaryani soon admitted to the press that she had been paid to fabricate this testimony by a nephew of Sri Roso.

Meanwhile, the PWI and Bernas teams concluded that Udin had been murdered by a government official intent on saving face. By late September, Bernas was under political pressure to cease coverage of the case. One of the PWI team members, Putut, reported that his daughter had been nearly kidnapped and his home broken into. Several journalistic and human rights organisations stated their belief that the murder was likely connected with Udin's reporting, including Amnesty International, which expressed its concern that allegations about the involvement of government officials had "not been properly investigated". The Committee to Protect Journalists sent a letter to President Suharto that demanded a full investigation into Udin's death, with the results made public. An independent report by the Indonesian Alliance of Independent Journalists praised the courage and neutrality of Udin's reporting, stating, "he was not an NGO activist, nor was he involved in the student movement. He was just an ordinary journalist who did an average job for a regional newspaper." However, the regent denied these reports and rumours; in a press conference on 23 August 1996, he said that he was "at the receiving end of over-dramatization".

== Arrest of Dwi Sumaji ==
On 21 October, the police arrested Dwi Sumaji, an advertising company driver, for the murder; they alleged that Sumaji had killed Udin for having an affair with his wife, Sunarti. After Sumaji confessed to the crime, police announced that an iron bar and a T-shirt, both stained with Udin's blood, had been found in Sumaji's home. Though Sumaji's police-appointed lawyer agreed that Sumaji had confessed to the crime, within a week Sumaji obtained independent counsel through whom he attempted to withdraw the confession. Marsiyem, who had seen her husband's attackers, insisted that Sumaji was innocent. On 23 October, Bernas published a sketch of Udin's attacker, drawn soon after the murder based on Marsiyem's description, with a picture of Sumaji; under Sumaji's photograph, they wrote "Ditolak" ("rejected"), drawing attention to the dissimilarities between the two.

Sumaji withdrew his confession, then alleged that police had encouraged him to confess after plying him with alcohol and bribing him with money, a prostitute, and a better job if he confessed to the crime. Sunarti, incredulous that her husband could be a murderer, wrote letters to several high-ranking officials and bodies, including President Suharto. Only one, to the National Commission on Human Rights (Komnas HAM), received a reply: on 28 October, the commission announced that it would investigate irregularities in Sumaji's arrest and internment. Meanwhile, Sumaji's counsel and the White Kijang team located several witnesses to corroborate Sumaji's account, including the prostitute.

The police continued the investigation, under pressure to finish quickly. Two reconstructions of the murder were conducted, drawing hundreds of spectators. One was done with Sumaji playing the role of the murderer, without his lawyers' knowledge; when the counsel found out, they removed him from the reconstruction. Eventually, police agreed to a deal with the counsel, in which Sumaji's pre-trial release was guaranteed in exchange for a promise from his lawyers to not sue for wrongful arrest. Sumaji was released on 17 December, awaiting trial. In early 1997, Sumaji's case was refused by the prosecutor's office several times due to weak evidence.

== Mishandling charges ==
On 7 November, Udin's family announced their intention to sue the city for improper use of evidence. This announcement followed a report from police chief Mulyono that Udin's blood had been disposed of in the southern sea off Parangtritis Beach as an offering to Nyai Roro Kidul, the area's deity, to ensure quick resolution of the investigation. Marsiyem's lawyers from the Legal Aid Institute (Lembaga Bantuan Hukum) filed a case in January 1997 against the police (national, provincial, and local), and Edy Wuryanto. The lawsuit demanded Rp. 1 million (US$36,400) in damages. The police countered that the blood had been given voluntarily, and that Marsiyem hoped to exploit the situation.

The hearing began on 21 January 1997, under the supervision of a three-judge panel led by Mikaela Warsito. After both sides were unable to come to an amicable settlement, a several-month-long trial began, in which Udin's family, Bernas reporters, and the police testified. On 7 April 1997, Wuryanto was convicted of destroying evidence for taking the blood, which Marisyem's lawyers speculated was used to frame Sumaji. Only a small percentage of the damages were awarded, after the court ruled that testimony from Udin's family – whom they saw as having a conflict of interest in the outcome of the case – was ineligible.

== Trial of Sumaji ==
Shortly before Marsiyem's case concluded, the members of the White Kijang team were assigned to other, distant cities. After a final, unsuccessful, plea by Sumaji's council on 5 May 1997 to drop the case, the prosecutor's office appointed Amrin Naim to lead the case against Sumaji. On 15 July, after the legislative elections, the office filed charges; the trial began on 29 July, with two members of the three-judge panel that served in the Marsiyem case.

After a failed attempt by the defence to question the court's jurisdiction, several witnesses were questioned over a period of several weeks, including Udin's neighbours and wife, as well as Sudarmo's nephew. The hearings, which were held on Mondays and Thursdays, were filled with spectators. At the trial, the defence suggested that a government conspiracy may have been responsible, but were told by the tribunal to focus on the case at hand. Further witnesses, including a key witness for the prosecution, came across as unconvincing; they also changed their stories, reneging statements which they had made before the trial. Other witnesses for the prosecution, including several of Sumaji's neighbours, testified that the driver could not have committed the murder because he was at home on the night of 13 August. Another said that the steel pipe said to be the murder weapon in court was different from that found with Udin's blood on it.

On 2 October 1997, the prosecution began to call more witnesses. Although attendance did not abate, most observers were police officers or paid spectators. One witness, who claimed to have participated in a sting operation to arrest Sumaji, was arrested for perjury. An officer who investigated Sumaji reported that he had pursued the driver based on instinct, not evidence. Wuryanto, while presenting his account, was contemptuous towards the defence and ordered by the judge several times to answer truthfully. On 3 November, the prosecution withdrew its case. Under Indonesian law, the judges had the right to find the subject guilty despite the prosecution's withdrawal; after further consideration, on 27 November, the tribunal acquitted Sumaji. Following the acquittal, Bantual police refused to investigate Udin's murder further; several of Yogyakarta's police chiefs stated that the department had fulfilled its duty by arresting a suspect and sending him to trial.

== Aftermath ==
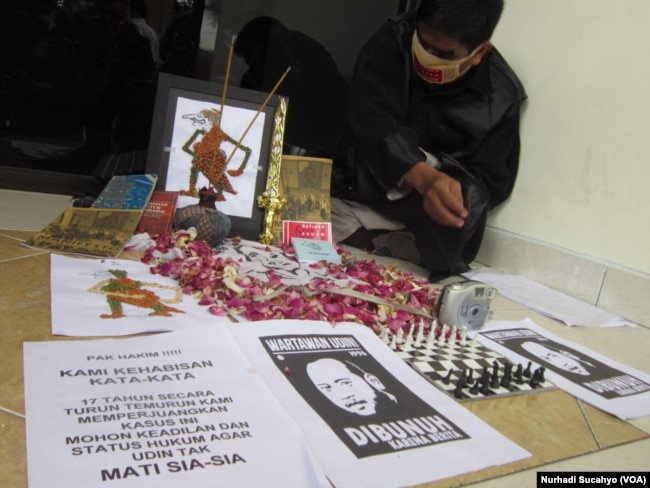
Journalists' action at the Sleman District Court during the trial of the journalists' lawsuit against the Yogyakarta Special Region Police, December 2013

On 6 June, several weeks after President Suharto resigned, Sudarmo was ousted from his office after students conducted a sit-in at the Bantul Assembly House. He was soon convicted of corruption for his payment to the Dharmais Foundation, but the conviction was overturned by a higher court, after which Sudarmo retired. Wuryanto never served time for his disposal of Udin's blood.

Sumaji's defence initially prepared a legal case for wrongful imprisonment, but the driver chose not to pursue it. He was unable to work for three years due to the infamy he had acquired from the case, but by 2000 was driving a public bus near Mount Merapi. By 2000, Marsiyem had married a neighbour, with whom she had a child.

The Alliance of Independent Journalists created the "Udin Award" in Udin's honour, "given for exceptional contribution to press freedom". In 2010, the organisation also petitioned the National Police to take over the case, noting that under Indonesian law, the case could be declared "expired" in 2014.

== See also ==
- Sander Thoenes: a Dutch journalist killed by soldiers from the Indonesian Army
- Rico Sempurna Pasaribu: an Indonesian journalist killed after reporting on gambling within the Indonesian Army
- Crime in Indonesia
- List of unsolved murders (1980–1999)

== Bibliography ==
- Tesoro, Josė Manuel (2004). The Invisible Palace. Jakarta: Equinox. ISBN 979-97964-7-4.
