= Bernas (newspaper) =

Newspaper and online service in Yogyakarta, Indonesia

- Type: Online newspaper
- Owner(s): PT Media Bernas Jogja (Hebat Group)
- Founder(s): Soemanang Soerjowinoto
- Founded: 15 September 1946
- Ceased publication: 28 February 2018 (print)
- City: Yogyakarta
- Country: Indonesia
- Website: bernas.id

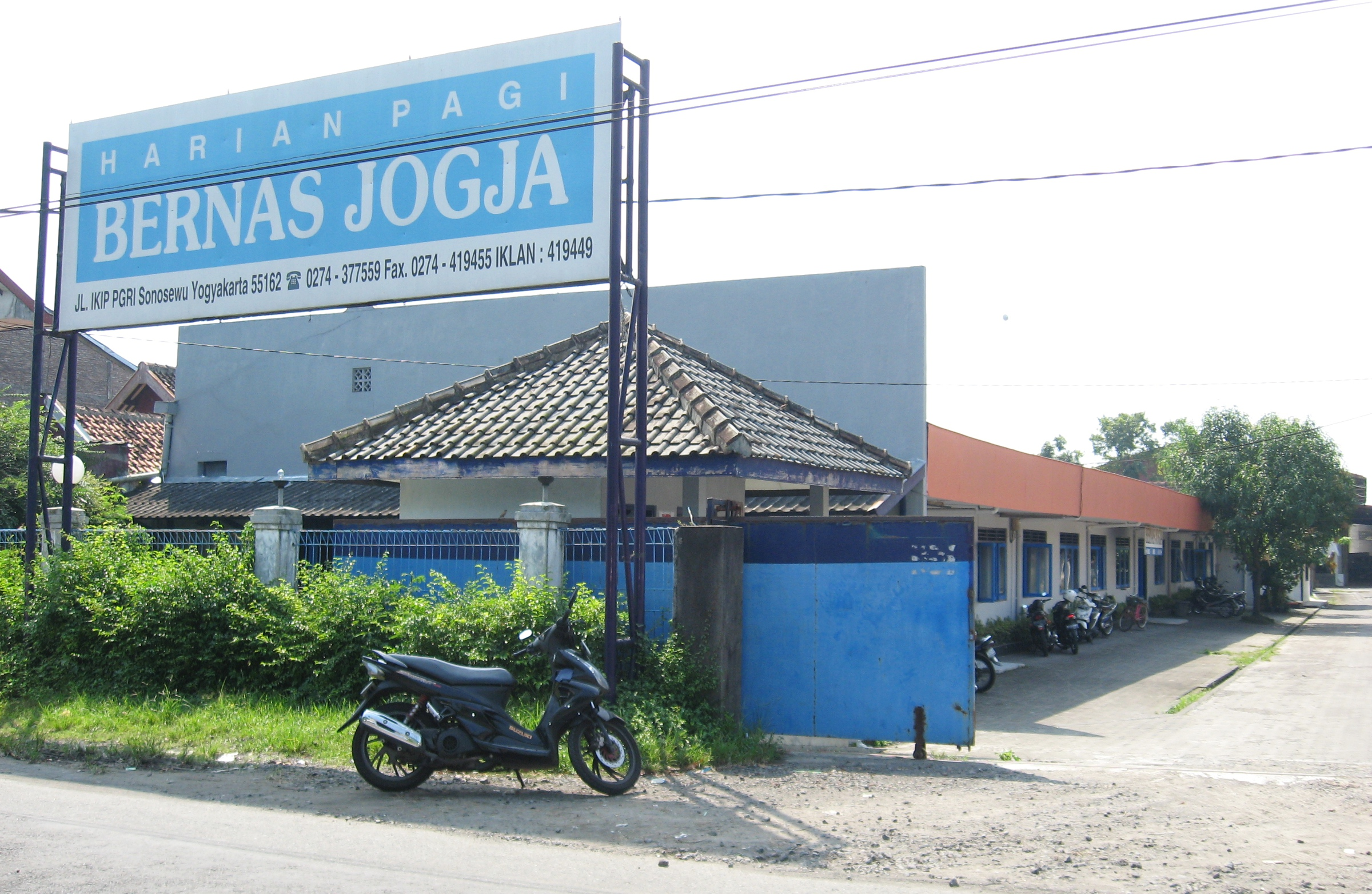
Former headquarters in Kasihan, Bantul Regency.

Bernas is an online-only newspaper, formerly a daily newspaper, based in Yogyakarta, Indonesia. It was one of the first newspapers founded after Indonesian independence.

== History ==
Bernas was founded on 15 September 1946 as Harian Umum Nasional by Soemanang Soerjowinoto. Its original editorial board consisted of Soemanang, Mashoed Hardjokoesoemo, Bob Maemun, Marbangoen, Mohammad Soepadi, Darsyaf Rahman, and RM Soetio. At the time, Yogyakarta was the temporary capital of the newly independent country. During the entirety of the Indonesian National Revolution, the paper consisted of only two or four pages, printed on whatever paper was available at the time. After the war, Bernas continued to publish.

On 26 March 1965, Decree of the Information Minister Number 29/SK/M/65 was passed. This required all newspapers to ally themselves with a political party. Harian Umum Nasional, which allied itself with the Indonesian National Party, changed its name to Suluh Indonesia, becoming an extension of a Jakarta-based newspaper of the same name. When the office in Jakarta changed its name to Suluh Marhaen, the Yogyakarta branch followed suit. By this time the paper had expanded to eight pages daily.

In 1969, after the failed 30 September Movement of 1965 and resulting killings led to the fall of President Sukarno, the Ministry of Information rescinded the 1965 order. Once again independent, the Yogyakarta branch of Suluh Marhaen renamed itself Berita Nasional (National News), which was abbreviated Bernas (Bernas itself also means "firm"). On 13 August 1990, Bernas was acquired by the Kompas Gramedia Group and became part of Persda newspaper chain (currently Tribun Network). This was followed by another rename, in which Bernas became the official name of the paper. By the 1990s, they had a circulation of 64,500, each edition had 12 pages.

At one of its heights, it has the second-largest circulation of the Yogyakarta Special Region area, after Kedaulatan Rakyat.

In 1996, Bernas reporter Fuad Muhammad Syafruddin, better known as "Udin", published a series of articles exposing corruption in the local government of the Bantul Regency. He was severely beaten on 13 August of that year by two men who were never caught, and died three days later without regaining consciousness. Due to the widespread suspicion that local government officials played a role in a death, his case became a national cause célèbre. A team of Bernas journalists—known as the "White Kijang" team for the type of car they drove—launched its own investigation of the case, locating witnesses to help clear a driver who had allegedly been bribed by police to make a false confession in the case. Udin's murder was not yet solved to this day.

On 29 August 2004, Bernas changed its name to Bernas Jogja, switched to a seven-column format from the previous nine. As of 2010 it has a circulation of 30,500, most of which is in the city proper and Sleman. Eighty-five percent of its readership is male. The name change only reverted to Bernas on 20 May 2015 when property developer company Hebat Group took the majority share of the newspaper.

On 1 March 2018, after 71 years of existence, the newspaper ceased physical circulation after publishing its final edition a day before due to declining readership and ad revenues coupled with increasing costs, though it maintained a digital version.

== Bibliography ==
- Tesoro, Josė Manuel (2004). The Invisible Palace. Jakarta: Equinox. ISBN 979-97964-7-4.
