= List of Urdu television channels =

This is a list of Urdu-language television channels in Pakistan and the rest of the world.

== Pakistan ==
=== Entertainment ===
- Aaj Entertainment
- A-Plus Entertainment
- A-Plus TV
- ARY Digital
- ARY Digital UK
- ARY Zindagi
- Express Entertainment
- Geo Kahani
- Geo Entertainment
- Hum Sitaray
- Hum TV
- Play Entertainment
- PTV Global
- PTV Home
- Urdu 1

=== Lifestyle and health ===
- Masala TV

=== Music ===
- 8XM
- 8XM Jalwa
- ARY Musik

=== News ===
- 24 Digital
- 92 News
- Aaj News
- Abb Takk News
- ARY News
- Bol News
- Capital TV
- Dawn News
- Dunya News
- Express News
- Geo News
- Geo Tez
- GTV Network HD
- GNN
- Pakistan TV
- PTV News
- SAMAA TV
- Such TV

=== Regional ===
- City 42 – covering Lahore
- City 41 – covering Faisalabad

=== Religious ===
- Ahlebait TV
- ARY Qtv
- Hadi TV
- Hidayat TV
- Labbaik TV
- Madani Channel
- Peace TV Urdu
- MTA International

=== Sports ===
- Geo Super – owned by Geo TV Network
- PTV Sports – owned by PTV Network

=== Children's ===
- Cartoon Network (Some programs)

== United Kingdom ==
=== Religious ===
- Ahlebait TV
- Hidayat TV
- Madani Channel
- Takbeer TV
- MTA International

== Iran, Azerbaijan, Turkey, Caucasus, Iraq ==
- Hadi TV
- Sahar 2
- TRT Arabi

== See also ==
- Lists of television channels
- List of Indian television stations
- List of Pakistani television channels
- List of Punjabi-language television channels
- Urdu cinema
