= 2011 in Pakistani television =

List of years in Pakistani television
- … 2001; 2002; 2003; 2004; 2005; 2006; 2007; 2008; 2009; 2010; 2011; 2012; 2013; 2014; 2015; 2016; 2017; 2018; 2019; 2020; 2021 …
- Art; Archaeology; Architecture; Literature; Music; Philosophy; Science; +...

The following is a list of events affecting Pakistani television in 2011. Events listed include television show debuts, and finales; channel launches, and closures; stations changing or adding their network affiliations; and information about changes of ownership of channels or stations.

== Television programs ==
=== Programs debuting in 2011 ===
Start date	Show	Channel	Source
11 June	Extras (The Mango People)	Hum TV	
9 September	Maat	Hum TV	

== Channels ==
Launches:

- 11 July: 8XM

Closures:

- 1 October: MTV
- November: Tribune 24/7
