= 2010 in Pakistani television =

List of years in Pakistani television
- … 2000; 2001; 2002; 2003; 2004; 2005; 2006; 2007; 2008; 2009; 2010; 2011; 2012; 2013; 2014; 2015; 2016; 2017; 2018; 2019; 2020 …
- Art; Archaeology; Architecture; Literature; Music; Philosophy; Science; +...

The following is a list of events affecting Pakistani television in 2010. Events listed include television show debuts, and finales; channel launches, and closures; stations changing or adding their network affiliations; and information about changes of ownership of channels or stations.

== Television programs ==
=== Programs debuting in 2010 ===
Start date	Show	Channel	Source
26 June	Dastaan	Hum TV	
18 December	Main Abdul Qadir Hoon	Hum TV	

== Channels ==
Launches:

- 23 March: SUCH TV
