= Paksat-1 =

Pakistani communications satellite

- Names: Palapa-C1; HGS-3; Anatolia-1
- Mission type: Communications
- Operator: SATELINDO (1996-1998); Insurers (1998-1999); Hughes Space and Communications (1999-2011) and leased to: Kalitel (2000-2002); SUPARCO (2002-2011)
- COSPAR ID: 1996-006A
- SATCAT no.: 23779
- Website: https://indosatooredoo.com/
- Mission duration: 15 years (planned); 15 years (achieved)

Spacecraft properties
- Spacecraft: Paksat-1
- Spacecraft type: Boeing 601
- Bus: HS-601
- Manufacturer: Hughes Space and Communications Company
- Launch mass: 3,000 kg (6,600 lb)
- Dry mass: 1,740 kg (3,840 lb)
- Dimensions: Span: 21 m (69 ft)
- Power: 3730 watts

Start of mission
- Launch date: 1 February 1996, 01:15:01 UTC
- Rocket: Atlas IIAS (AC-126)
- Launch site: Cape Canaveral, LC-36B
- Contractor: Lockheed Martin
- Entered service: 20 December 2002

End of mission
- Disposal: Graveyard orbit
- Deactivated: 2011

Orbital parameters
- Reference system: Geocentric orbit
- Regime: Geostationary orbit
- Longitude: 113° East (1996-1998); 38° East (2002-2016)

Transponders
- Band: 34 transponders: 30 C-band; 4 Ku-band
- Bandwidth: 36 MHz (C-band), 72 MHz (Ku-band)
- Coverage area: Pakistan, Europe, Africa, Middle East, South Asia, Central Asia

Paksat-1, (formerly designated Palapa-C1, HGS-3 and Anatolia-1), was a geosynchronous and communications satellite built and owned by the Boeing Company, leased to Pakistan's Space & Upper Atmosphere Research Commission (SUPARCO) and renamed Paksat-1. It was successfully put into orbit on 1 February 1996 as Palapa-C1 for Indonesia as its original customer. But, after technical problems, the satellite was leased to SUPARCO at an orbital location of 38° East longitude in December 2002. Paksat-1 offers the C-band and Ku-band coverage in over 75 countries across Europe, Africa, Middle East, South and Central Asia. Its customers included government organizations, television broadcasters, telecommunications companies, data and broadband internet service providers.

It was eventually replaced by the advanced Paksat-1R satellite, which was successfully launched into orbit on 11 August 2011.

== History ==
=== Palapa-C1 ===
PT Satelit Palapa Indonesia (SATELINDO) chose Hughes in April 1993. It was built by Hughes Space and Communications Company for Indonesian telecommunications provider PT Satelit Palapa Indonesia (SATELINDO). It was based on the HS-601 satellite bus. Construction was done at El Segundo, California. Hughes also augmented the new master control station at Daan Mogot City near Jakarta. It had 30 C-band transponders and 4 Ku-band transponders. It was due to be located in geosynchronous orbit at 113° East above the equator.

=== Launch ===
Palapa-C1 was launched by an Atlas IIAS launch vehicle on 1 February 1996 at 01:15:01 UTC. The satellites were launched from Cape Canaveral in Florida. The liquid apogee engine of the satellite then raises it to geostationary orbit.

Later Indonesia declared the satellite unusable after an electric power anomaly. The insurance claims were paid and the title was transferred to Hughes Space and Communications Company, and renamed HGS-3, and was then acquired by Pakistan from Hughes Global Services on "Full Time Leasing" and relocated to Pakistan's reserved orbital position at 38° East.

=== HGS-3 ===
Hughes Global Services purchased the satellite and renamed HGS-3.

=== Anatolia-1 ===
The satellite was renamed Anatolia-1.

=== Paksat-1 ===
Pakistan's government approved the acquisition on 3 July 2002 and the leasing with Hughes Global Services was agreed on 6 August 2002. The satellite started moving to its new orbital position on 5 December 2002 and it went through a name change from Anatolia-1 to Paksat-1 on 18 December 2002. After a series of orbital maneuvers, the satellite was stabilized at its final location on 20 December 2002 with 0° inclination. The satellite is in position at the Pakistani-licensed orbital location, 38° East longitude. The satellite was acquired for a cost of around five million dollars.

== Mission ==
The services include satellite communications in both C-band and Ku-band to customers in Pakistan, Africa and the Middle East. Paksat-1's 30 C-band transponders and 4 Ku-band transponders provide total range of satellite communication capabilities.

== Payload characteristics ==
30 C-band transponders and 4 Ku-band transponders provide the total range of satellite communications capabilities. The satellite is in a geostationary orbit at 38° East Longitude, and carries high power payloads in both bands.

Payload characteristics of PAKSAT-1 are as below:

C-Band Payload Characteristics
| Number of transponders | 24 in standard C-band; 6 in extended C-band |
| Redundancy | All redundancy available |
| Channel bandwidth | 36 MHz |
| Uplink frequency band | 5925 MHz – 6665 MHz |
| Downlink frequency | band 3400 MHz – 4200 MHz |
| Beams | Southern regions Northern regions |
| Beam connectivity | All transponders can be switched independently to downlink in the southern beam. Many transponders can downlink in the northern beam. All transponders can be switched independently to uplink from either beam |
| Polarization | Linear crosspol |
| EIRP (at peak of beam) | 38 dBW |
| G/T (at peak of beam) | +2 dB/K |

Ku-band Payload Characteristics
| Number of transponders | 4 |
| Redundancy | All redundancy available |
| Channel bandwidth | 72 MHz |
| Uplink frequency band | 13754 MHz – 14486 MHz |
| Downlink frequency band | 10954 MHz – 11686 MHz |
| Beams | Southern regions, Northern regions |
| Beam connectivity | All transponders can be switched independently to uplink or downlink in either beam |
| Polarization | Linear colpol |
| EIRP (at peak of beam) | 52 dBW |
| G/T (at peak of beam) | +5 dB/K |

== Applications ==
- Internet backbone extension
- Point-to-point data services
- Remote Internet access
- Broadcast services (video and data)
- Business VSAT networks
- Direct-to-home
- Thin route telephony support
- Shipboard communications

== Channels ==
- Geo TV Network
- ARY Zauq
- ZINDAGI News
- Business Plus
- Channel 5
- City 42
- Dharti TV
- GNN
- Dhoom TV
- Din News
- filmWORLD
- G Kaboom
- Hadi TV
- Haq TV
- Indus News
- Indus Vision
- Kook TV
- Labbaik TV
- Madani Channel
- Mashal TV
- Mehran TV
- Metro One
- MTV Pakistan
- N-Vibe
- Nick Pakistan
- Oxygen
- Oye
- Play
- PTV Bolan
- Punjab TV
- Ravi TV
- Sindh TV
- Sindh TV News
- Sohni Dharti
- Star Asia
- Value TV
- VSH News
- VTV 1 (Virtual University)
- VTV 2 (Virtual University)
- VTV 3 (Virtual University)
- VTV 4 (Virtual University)
- Zaiqa
- ptv sports
- Feed1
- Ptv Global
- Ptv World

== Paksat footprints ==
Paksat-1 has two beams each in both C-band and Ku-bands, i.e. C1, C2 and K1, K2, respectively. In C-band, C1 (Southern Beam) covers mainly African Continent and Middle East. The C2 (Northern Beam) covers South Asia, Middle East, African Continent, Central Asian States and Southern Europe. In Ku-band, K1 (Southern Beam) covers mainly Middle East and Eastern Africa. K2 (Northern Beam) covers South Asia, Middle East and Central Asian States.

| C1 - Southern Beam EIRP Contours | C1 - Southern Beam G/T Contours |
| C2 - Northern Beam EIRP Contours | C2 - Northern Beam G/T Contours |
| K1 - Southern Beam EIRP Contours | K1 - Southern Beam G/T Contours |
| K2- Northern Beam EIRP Contours | K2- Northern Beam G/T Contours |

== Future projects ==
Telesat, one of the world's leading satellite operators, announced on 13 March 2007, that it had signed a consulting contract with the Space and Upper Atmosphere Research Commission (SUPARCO), Pakistan's national space agency. Under the agreement, Telesat will assist SUPARCO in the procurement and launch of the Paksat-1R satellite, which will replace the existing Paksat-1 in 2010.
