= 2006 in Pakistani television =

List of years in Pakistani television
- … 1996; 1997; 1998; 1999; 2000; 2001; 2002; 2003; 2004; 2005; 2006; 2007; 2008; 2009; 2010; 2011; 2012; 2013; 2014; 2015; 2016 …
- Art; Archaeology; Architecture; Literature; Music; Philosophy; Science; +...

The following is a list of events affecting Pakistani television in 2006. Events listed include television show debuts, and finales; channel launches, and closures; stations changing or adding their network affiliations; and information about changes of ownership of channels or stations.

== Television programs ==
=== Programs debuting in 2006 ===
Start date	Show	Channel	Source
3 March	Dil, Diya, Dehleez	Hum TV	
August	Survivor Pakistan		
	Pehchaan	Hum TV	
	Kuch Dil Ne Kaha	Geo Entertainment	
	Piya Kay Ghar Jana Hai	ARY Digital	
	Manzil	ARY Digital	
	Makan	Geo Entertainment	
	Barson Baad	PTV	
	Gharoor	PTV	

== Channels ==
Launches:

- 21 January: Peace TV
- 16 May: Geo Kahani
- 7 August: Play
- September: Geo Super
- 22 November: MTV
- 22 November: Hum Masala
- 23 November: Nickelodeon
- Unknown: PTV Global
