= List of English-language television channels in Pakistan =

This is a list of the English-language television channels in Pakistan. This list contains the channels that are stationed in Pakistan by PEMRA and broadcast by almost all the cable operators.

== List by category ==
=== Educational ===
- PTV Teleschool

=== Music ===
- 8XM (airs some international music videos)

=== News ===
- BBC World News
- CGTN
- CNN
- DW-TV
- Indus News
- NHK World
- PT
- PTV World
- RT

=== Sports ===
- Geo Super - A few programmes are in English language
- PTV Sports - Most content is in English but some events/programmes are in Urdu

=== Kids ===
- Cartoon Network Pakistan
- Nickelodeon Pakistan
- Pop Pakistan

=== Defunct ===
- HBO Pakistan
- WB Channel

== See also ==
- List of television stations in Pakistan
- Television in Pakistan
- List of Pakistani radio channels
