= Yousaf Baig Mirza =

Pakistani media executive

- Occupation: Media mogul
- Known for: Public News

Yousaf Baig Mirza is a Pakistani media mogul who is the founder of a Pakistani news channel, Public News.

Mirza has served as a Special Assistant on Media to the Prime Minister of Pakistan, as CEO of Express Media Group and as managing director (MD) of Pakistan Television (PTV).

== Career ==
In January 1998, Mirza was first appointed as managing director of the Pakistan Television by the then-Prime Minister Nawaz Sharif. He continued to serve as the MD of PTV until March 2003 when Gen. Pervez Musharraf was President.

In April 2007, Mirza was again made the head of PTV by the then-Prime Minister Shaukat Aziz. He served in the position for a bit over one year till Shahid Masood replaced him as MD.

In October 2010, he was again appointed as MD of PTV by the then-Prime Minister Yousuf Raza Gilani.

In November 2013, Mirza joined Express Media Group as chief executive officer.

In December 2018, Mirza was appointed as a Special Assistant on Media to the Prime Minister of Pakistan, Imran Khan. In November 2019, he resigned from the position to return to the media industry.
