= AsiaSat 7 =

AsiaSat communications satellite

- Names: AsiaSat 5C
- Mission type: Communications
- Operator: AsiaSat
- COSPAR ID: 2011-069A
- SATCAT no.: 37933
- Website: https://www.asiasat.com
- Mission duration: 15 years (planned); 13 years, 3 months and 9 days (in progress)

Spacecraft properties
- Spacecraft: AsiaSat 7
- Spacecraft type: SSL 1300
- Bus: LS-1300
- Manufacturer: Space Systems/Loral
- Launch mass: 3,813 kg (8,406 lb)

Start of mission
- Launch date: 25 November 2011, 19:10:34 UTC
- Rocket: Proton-M / Briz-M
- Launch site: Baikonur, Site 200/39
- Contractor: Khrunichev State Research and Production Space Center
- Entered service: January 2012

Orbital parameters
- Reference system: Geocentric orbit
- Regime: Geostationary orbit
- Longitude: 105° East

Transponders
- Band: 40 transponders: 26 C-band; 14 Ku-band
- Coverage area: Asia, Pacific Ocean region

AsiaSat 7 is a Hong Kong communications satellite, which is operated by the Hong Kong–based Asia Satellite Telecommunications Company (AsiaSat). It is positioned in geostationary orbit at a longitude of 105° East of the Greenwich Meridian, where it serves as a back-up for the AsiaSat 5 satellite and replaced AsiaSat 3S. It is used to provide fixed satellite services, including broadcasting, telephone and broadband very small aperture terminal (VSAT) communications, to Asia and the Pacific Ocean region.

== Satellite description ==
Space Systems/Loral and AsiaSat announced in May 2009, that it has been chosen to provide a new communications satellite, named AsiaSat 5C. In early 2010, the satellite was renamed AsiaSat 7. At launch, AsiaSat 7 had a mass of 3,813 kg (8,406 lb), and was expected to operate for fifteen years. It carries 26 C-band and 14 Ku-band transponders.

== Launch ==
AsiaSat 7 was built by Space Systems/Loral, and is based on the LS-1300 satellite bus. It is being launched by International Launch Services (ILS), using a Proton-M launch vehicle with a Briz-M upper stage. The launch was conducted from Site 200/39 at the Baikonur Cosmodrome in Kazakhstan, at 19:10:34 UTC on 25 November 2011. The Briz-M separated from the Proton-M nine minutes and forty-one seconds into the flight, and AsiaSat 7 separated from the Briz-M into a geosynchronous transfer orbit (GTO) nine hours and thirteen minutes after liftoff. It then raises itself into its final geostationary orbit.

== See also ==
- AsiaSat 6
