= Paksat-MM1 =

PakSat-MM1 communications satellite

- Names: AsiaSat 4 Paksat-MM1
- Mission type: Communications
- Operator: AsiaSat (2003–2017); PAKSAT (2018–2023)
- COSPAR ID: 2003-014A
- SATCAT no.: 27718
- Website: https://www.asiasat.com
- Mission duration: 15 years (planned); 23 years and 8 days

Spacecraft properties
- Spacecraft: AsiaSat 4
- Spacecraft type: Boeing 601
- Bus: HS-601HP
- Manufacturer: Hughes Space and Communications
- Launch mass: 4,137 kg (9,121 lb)
- Dry mass: 2,500 kg (5,500 lb)
- Dimensions: 3.4 m x 3.5 m x 5.8 m Span: 26.2 m on orbit
- Power: 9.6 kW

Start of mission
- Launch date: 12 April 2003, 00:47:01 UTC
- Rocket: Atlas 3B SEC (AC-205)
- Launch site: Cape Canaveral, SLC-36B
- Contractor: Lockheed Martin
- Entered service: June 2003

Orbital parameters
- Reference system: Geocentric orbit
- Regime: Geostationary orbit
- Longitude: 122° East (2003–2017); 38° East (2018–present)

Transponders
- Band: 48 transponders: 28 C-band; 20 Ku-band
- Coverage area: Asia, Pacific Ocean

Paksat-MM1 (formerly known as AsiaSat 4) was a leased communications satellite operated by SUPARCO, Pakistan's national space agency. The satellite was provided by Asia Satellite Telecommunications Company (AsiaSat), a Hong Kong-based satellite operator.

Initially stationed at 122° East longitude, Paksat-MM1 was later relocated to 38.2° East to better serve Pakistan and the surrounding region. During most of its operational life at 122° East, it provided fixed satellite services, including broadcasting, audio, and data transmission, to Asia and the Pacific Ocean region.

== Satellite description ==
AsiaSat 4 was built by Hughes Space and Communications, for US$220 million, which by the time of its launch had become part of Boeing Satellite Systems. It is based on the HS-601HP satellite bus. At launch, it had a mass of 4,137 kg (9,121 lb), and a design life of fifteen years. It carries twenty eight C-band and twenty Ku-band transponders. It was planned for late 1999, but was delayed because of the Asian crisis. Construction started in September 2000.

== Launch ==
AsiaSat 4 was launched by an Atlas 3B SEC launch vehicle with the Centaur upper stage from Cape Canaveral Air Force Station (SLC-36B) at 00:47:01 UTC on 12 April 2003.

AsiaSat 4 was insured for launch and first year in orbit. The AsiaSat 4 was replaced by AsiaSat 9 in 2017.

== Life as Paksat-MM1 ==
In February 2018 it was leased by PakSat International, a subsidiary of SUPARCO (Pakistan's space agency), from the Asia Satellite Telecommunications Company (AsiaSat) . Previously positioned at 122° East longitude, it was relocated to 38.2° East to serve Pakistan's needs. Paksat renamed it Paksat-MM1 (Paksat-Multi Mission 1) and began operations in March 2018.

After the lease expired, the satellite was returned to China and relocated to 147.5° East. As of 29 August 2024 (according to flysat.com), it is no longer operational and has been replaced by PakSat-MM1R, a new satellite launched on 30 May 2024.

== See also ==
- Paksat-1
- Paksat-1R
- AsiaSat 9
