= Shazma Haleem =

Pakistani actress

Shazma Haleem is a Pakistani actress born in Swabi, Khyber Pakhtunkhwa. She has worked in many TV shows and also got an award from PTV. She has also appeared in theatre productions and hosted a show on Khyber TV.
