= Southern Africa Direct =

History
- Replaced by: Takbeer TV

Southern Africa Direct (or SA Direct as it is known) is a lifestyle and culture television channel, broadcast in the United Kingdom. The channel streams programmes online through its website. The channel was also available on the Sky Digital platform until January 2010.

The channel markets itself as the first 'Destination TV' channel in the UK and is primarily focused on Southern Africa. The channel offers programmes about lifestyle, culture, travel, tourism, commerce, and trade.

SA Direct was initially broadcast on the Sky Digital platform. It was removed from the Sky EPG on 9 October 2009, however, the channel returned to Sky on 6 November 2009. It started off only broadcasting two hours a day (noon – 2 pm), and increased its hours to cover the afternoon and evening. The channel was acting as a placeholder until the EPG slot was sold to another broadcaster. On 11 January 2010, Takbeer TV began testing after purchasing the Southern Africa Direct EPG slot and replaced it on 14 January. Despite the fact that SA Direct is not currently being broadcast on any major television platform, the channel is still operating as a commercial business over the internet. The channel's website claims that SA Direct will return to television broadcasts in the future.
