= 2009 in Pakistani television =

The following is a list of events affecting Pakistani television in 2009. Events listed include television show debuts, and finales; channel launches, and closures; stations changing or adding their network affiliations; and information about changes of ownership of channels or stations.

== Television programs ==
=== Programs debuting in 2009 ===
Start date	Show	Channel	Source
22 October	Bulbulay	ARY Digital	
28 November	Meri Zaat Zarra-e-Benishan	Geo TV	
25 April	Noorpur Ki Rani	Hum TV	

== Channels ==
Launches:

- Unknown: City 42
- Unknown: VSH News
- Unknown: Awaz Television Network
- 24 January: Oxygene TV
- 5 February: Tribune 24/7
- 24 July: A-Plus TV
