= Takbeer TV =

Islamic television channel in the United Kingdom

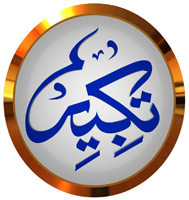
- Broadcast area: UK & Europe
- Headquarters: Birmingham UK

Programming
- Languages: Urdu, English & Arabic

Ownership
- Owner: Hazrat Sultan Bahu Trust

History
- Launched: 14 January 2010
- Replaced: SA Direct

Links
- Website: takbeer.tv

Availability

Streaming media
- Web streaming: takbeer.tv

Takbeer TV is a free-to-air Islamic TV Channel based in the United Kingdom. It can be viewed on Sky channel 744 as well as online and by certain satellite services. It was launched at a time when other Islamic channels were also being established.

== Mission ==
Takbeer TV Channel's aim is to provide, represent and promote a positive outlook of Muslims & Islam and to act as an interface between Muslims & non-Muslims in order to remove the misconceptions people have about Islam.

== Programming ==
Takbeer TV offers educational, current affairs, and entertainment programmes from an Islamic perspective. In October 2011, the channel began to air programming from Dawn News. Dawn News covers eighteen hours a day of the schedule, featuring news, current affairs shows such as 'News Night with Talat', 'Kab Tak' and 'Baat Nikaly Gee' and other shows e.g. 'Mast Morning With Maira', 'Sport Zone', 'A Taste of Fusion', '92[Identity]', 'Equinox' etc.

== Controversy ==
In 2010 Ofcom received a complaint regarding the alleged abusive treatment towards the Ahmadiyya Muslim Community. Ofcom asked the licensee on several occasions to provide the recording for review. The licensee did not provide the recording and the channel was held in breach of broadcasting regulations. Takbeer TV has also been reprimanded by Ofcom for "inciting violence" against Ahmadiyya Muslim Community.
