= AsiaSat =

Hong Kong-based commercial operator of communications satellites

Asia Satellite Telecommunications Holdings

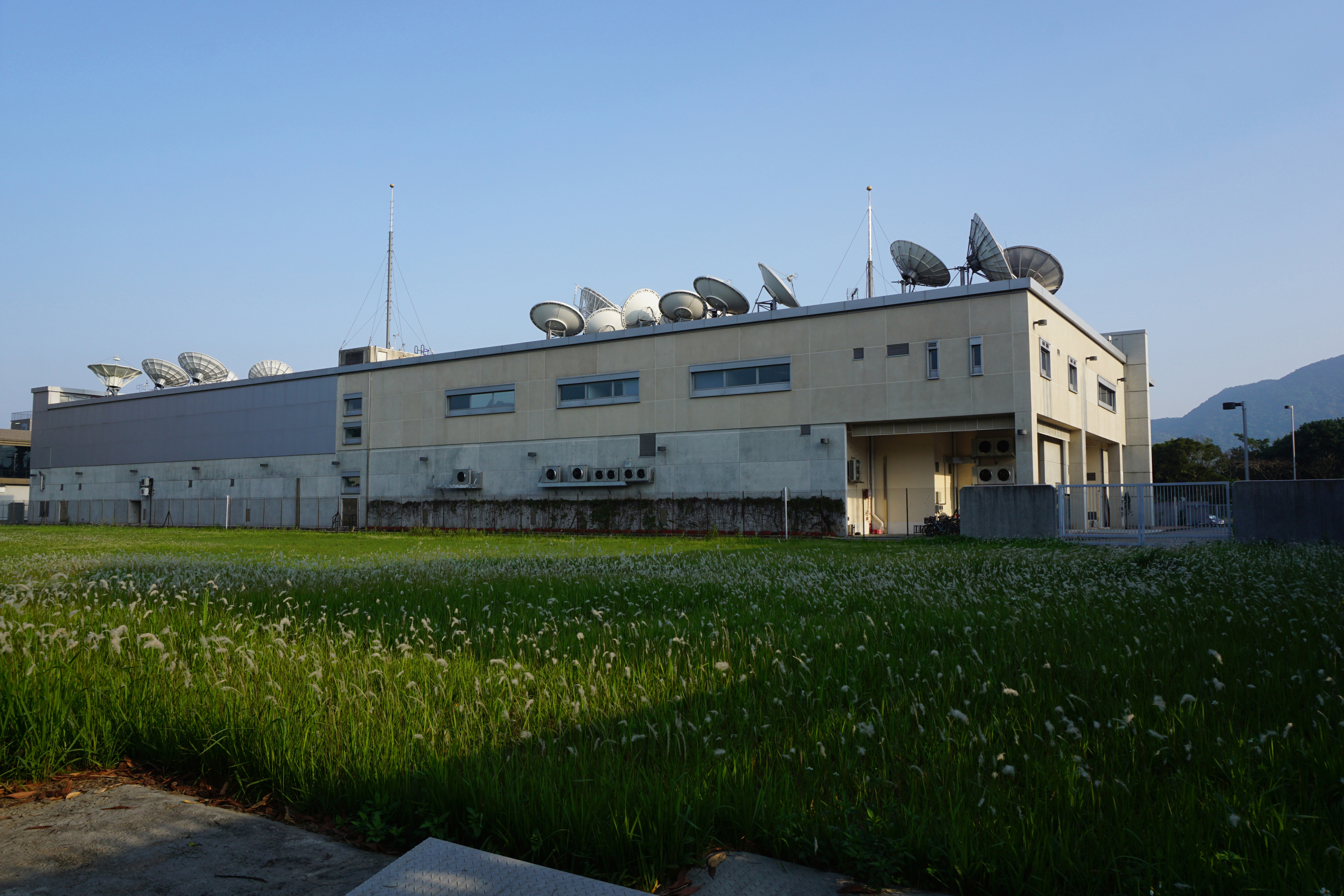
- AsiaSat office in Tai Po, Hong Kong
- Type: Private
- Industry: Communications satellite
- Founded: 1988
- Headquarters: Hong Kong (de facto); Bermuda (registered office)
- Brands: AsiaSat
- Revenue: ▲HK$1.354 billion (2017)
- Operating income: ▲HK$642 million (2017)
- Net income: ▼HK$397 million (2017)
- Total assets: ▼HK$7.401 billion (2017)
- Total equity: ▲HK$3.353 billion (2017)
- Owner: CITIC – Carlyle consortium (74.43%)
- Parent: Bowenvale
- Website: https://www.asiasat.com/

Asia Satellite Telecommunications Company Limited (AsiaSat) is a Hong Kong–based commercial operator of communications satellites founded in 1988. It is a wholly owned subsidiary of Asia Satellite Telecommunications Holdings Limited (AsiaSat Holdings), which is incorporated in Bermuda.

AsiaSat Holdings is jointly owned by Chinese state-owned CITIC Limited and private equity fund The Carlyle Group L.P. indirectly. It had a market capitalisation of HK$2 billion on 30 November 2018. It was a red chip company of the stock exchange. On 23 August 2019, the take private proposal scheme was approved by AsiaSat Holdings' public shareholders, followed by the approval of the Bermuda Court on 3 September 2019, whereupon The company became a private wholly owned subsidiary of Bowenvale Limited, a joint venture of CITIC and Carlyle. The listing of the company's shares was withdrawn from the Stock Exchange of Hong Kong on 5 September 2019.

== History ==
In September 2017, AsiaSat 9, AsiaSat's latest satellite built by Space Systems/Loral was successfully launched and replaced AsiaSat 4 at 122° East.

AsiaSat owns and operates seven satellites, including AsiaSat 3S, AsiaSat 4, AsiaSat 5, AsiaSat 6, AsiaSat 7, AsiaSat 8 and the new AsiaSat 9.

== Shareholders ==
As of 31 December 2017, the direct parent company, Bowenvale Limited, owned 74.43% shares; Bowenvale was jointly owned by CITIC Limited and The Carlyle Group LP in a 50–50 ratio. Standard Life Aberdeen plc was the second largest shareholder for 5.36%. In May 2018, the ratio owned by Standard Life Aberdeen had decreased to 4.99%. In November 2018, another private equity firm International Value Advisers owned 6.12% shares of AsiaSat.

On 3 September 2019, following the approval of the privatisation plan by public shareholders, Asia Satellite Telecommunications Holdings Limited became a privately wholly owned subsidiary of Bowenvale Limited, which is now jointly owned by CITIC Group and Carlyle Asia Partners IV, L.P.

== Launch history and future plans ==
This is a list of satellites owned and operated by AsiaSat.

AsiaSat satellites
Satellite	Launch Date (UTC)	Rocket	Launch Site	Contractor	Longitude	Status	Notes	Ref.
AsiaSat 1	7 Apr 1990	(China) Long March 3	(China) Xichang, LC-3	(China) CASC		Decommissioned	Launched as Westar 6 on Space Shuttle mission STS-41B, became stranded in orbit, was retrieved by Space Shuttle mission STS-51A in November 1984, sold to AsiaSat.	
AsiaSat 2	28 Nov 1995	(China) Long March 2E	(China) Xichang, LC-2	(China) CASC	100.5° East	Decommissioned		
AsiaSat 3	24 Dec 1997	(Russia) Proton-K / DM-2M	(Kazakhstan) Baikonur, Site 81/23	(United States) ILS	105.5° East (intended); 158° West (1998–1999); 62° West (1999–2002)	Decommissioned	Transferred to Hughes Global Services (HGS)	
AsiaSat 3S	21 Mar 1999	(Russia) Proton-K / DM-2M	(Kazakhstan) Baikonur, Site 81/23	(United States) ILS	147.5° East	Decommissioned	Replaced AsiaSat 1 on 8 May 1999 and was replaced by AsiaSat 7	
AsiaSat 4	12 Apr 2003	(United States) Atlas IIIB	(United States) Cape Canaveral, LC-36B	(United States) ILS	Relocated to a designated orbital position in November 2017	In Service		
AsiaSat 5	11 Aug 2009	(Russia) Proton-M / Briz-M	(Kazakhstan) Baikonur, Site 200/39	(Russia) Khrunichev	100.5° East	In Service	A replacement satellite for AsiaSat 2	
AsiaSat 6 / Thaicom 7	7 Sep 2014	(United States) Falcon 9 v1.1	(United States) Cape Canaveral, SLC-40	(United States) SpaceX	120° East	In Service		
AsiaSat 7	25 Nov 2011	(Russia) Proton-M / Briz-M	(Kazakhstan) Baikonur, Site 200/39	(Russia) Khrunichev	105.5° East	In Service	Replaced AsiaSat 3S at the orbital location of 105.5° East.	
AsiaSat 8	5 Aug 2014	(United States) Falcon 9 v1.1	(United States) Cape Canaveral, SLC-40	(United States) SpaceX	105.5° East	In Service	AsiaSat satellite with multiple Ku beams.	
AsiaSat 9	28 Sep 2017	(Russia) Proton-M / Briz-M	(Kazakhstan) Baikonur, Site 200/39	(Russia) Khrunichev	122° East	In Service	Replaced AsiaSat 4 at 122° East.	

== See also ==
- APT Satellite Holdings, fellow satellite communication company based in Hong Kong
