= AsiaSat 9 =

AsiaSat communications satellite

- Mission type: Communications
- Operator: AsiaSat
- COSPAR ID: 2017-057A
- SATCAT no.: 42942
- Website: https://www.asiasat.com
- Mission duration: 15 years (planned); 8 years, 6 months and 23 days (in progress)

Spacecraft properties
- Spacecraft: Asiasat 9
- Spacecraft type: SSL 1300
- Bus: LS-1300
- Manufacturer: Space Systems/Loral
- Launch mass: 6,141 kg (13,539 lb)

Start of mission
- Launch date: 28 September 2017, 18:52:16 UTC
- Rocket: Proton-M / Briz-M
- Launch site: Baikonur, Site 200/39
- Contractor: Khrunichev State Research and Production Space Center
- Entered service: November 2017

Orbital parameters
- Reference system: Geocentric orbit
- Regime: Geostationary orbit
- Longitude: 122° East

Transponders
- Band: 60 transponders: 28 C-band; 32 Ku-band
- Bandwidth: 36 MHz and 54 MHz
- Coverage area: Asia, Australia, New Zealand

AsiaSat 9 or Thaicom 7 is a geostationary communications satellite which is operated by the Asia Satellite Telecommunications Company (AsiaSat) and was launched into orbit on 28 September 2017.

== Satellite description ==
Space Systems/Loral (SS/L), announced in December 2013 that it has been chosen by AsiaSat, to build the AsiaSat 9 communications satellite. AsiaSat 9 was built by Space Systems/Loral, and is based on the LS-1300 satellite bus. The satellite carries 28 C-band transponders and 32 Ku-band and is positioned at a longitude of 122° East, providing coverage over southern Asia, Australia and New Zealand.

== Launch ==
Krunichev by International Launch Services (ILS) was contracted to launch AsiaSat 9 using a Proton-M / Briz-M launch vehicle. The launch took place from Site 200/39 at the Baikonur, on 28 September 2017, at 18:52:16 UTC. It replaces AsiaSat 4.

== See also ==
- 2017 in spaceflight
- List of Proton launches
