= Gourmet Foods =

Pakistani food manufacturer

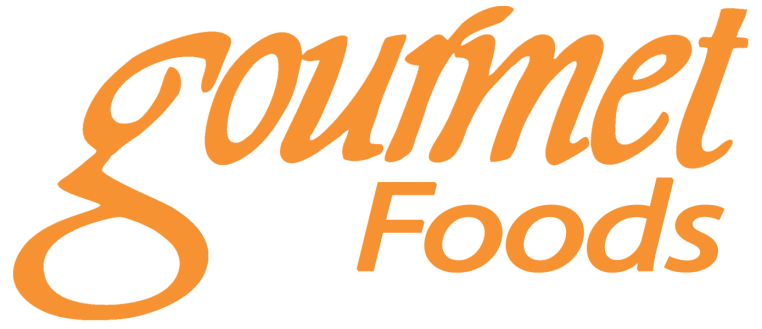

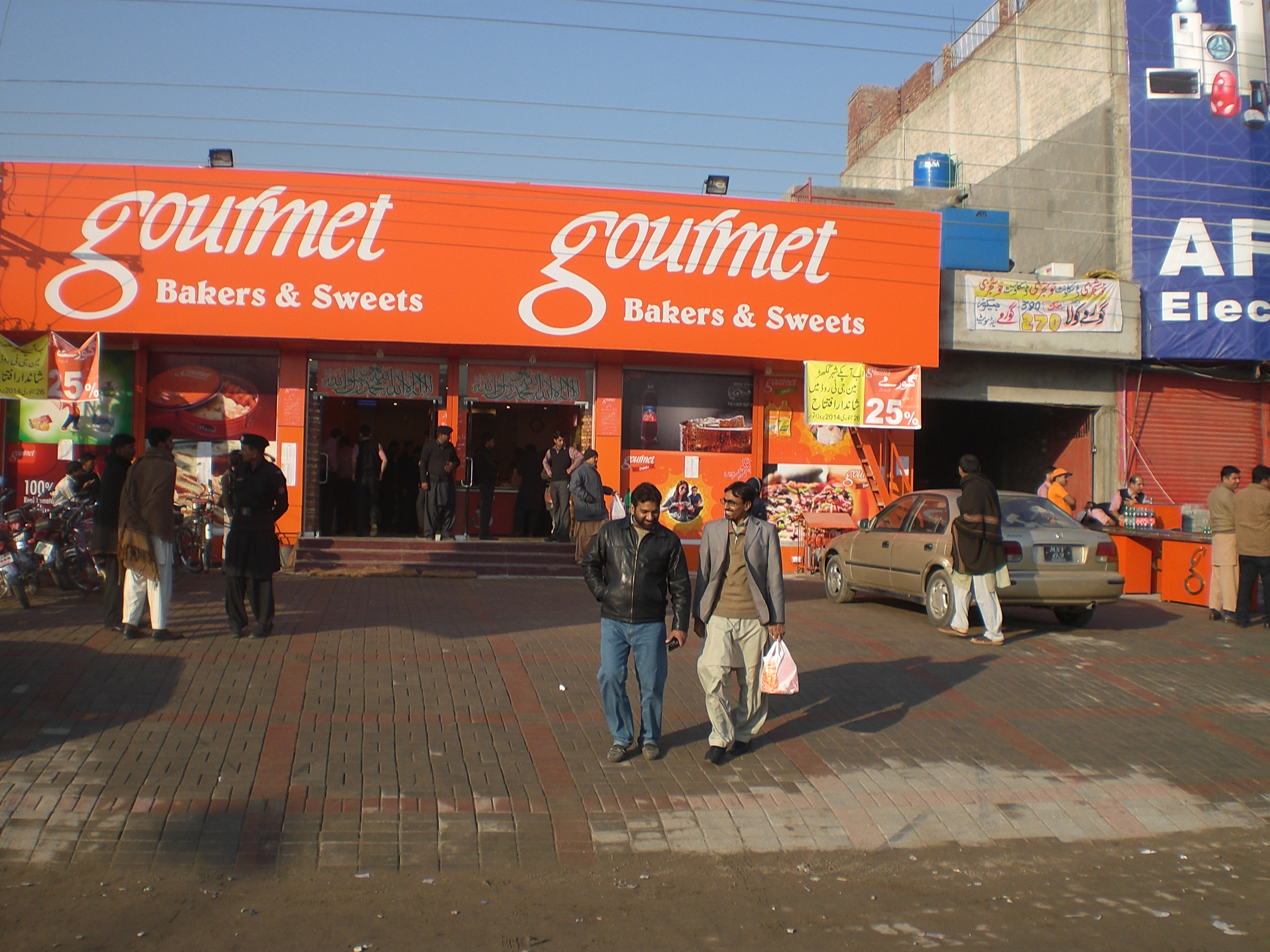
- Gourmet Bakery in Gakhar Mandi
- Type: Private
- Industry: Bakery
- Founded: September 10, 1987; 39 years ago
- Founder: Muhammad Nawaz Chattha
- Headquarters: Lahore, Punjab, Pakistan
- Number of locations: 250+
- Area served: Pakistan
- Products: Baked and Unbaked Desserts; Breakfast Pastries; Restaurant; Dairy Products, Sweets; Fruit Jams and Jelly; Fruit Juices and Beverage Products; Catering Services
- Owner: Zubair Nawaz Chattha
- Number of employees: 10,000+
- Website: Official website

Gourmet Foods in of food products headquartered in Lahore, Pakistan. It has seven processing units across the country and over 100 stores in Lahore.

== History ==
Gourmet Foods was founded by Muhammad Nawaz Chattha of a small village Kookan Wala near Hafizabad division gujranwala in 1987. A small confectionery shop was opened on September 10, 1987, in Gulshan-e-Ravi, Lahore, Pakistan.

=== Other business ventures ===
In 2018, the group ventured into the media industry and launched its news channel GNN. The channel is a re-branding of the previously existing Jaag TV network (formerly known as CNBC Pakistan), which Gourmet acquired in 2016 for Rs. 1.5 billion.

== Gourmet Foods (Group) Products ==
- Gourmet Bakery
- Gourmet Sweets
- Gourmet Soft Drink (Gourmet Cola)
- Gourmet Media Group (GNN Tv)

== Awards and Recognitions ==
In 2025, Gourmet Foods Pakistan received several awards at regional and national business award events. At the 9th South Asian Partnership Summit & Business Excellence Awards, held in Colombo, Sri Lanka, on 27 November 2025, the company received the Best Manufacturing Company in the FMCG Sector Award and the Best in Talent Management Award. The company's Chief Executive, Zubair Nawaz Chattha, was also recognized with the CEO of the Year 2025 Award at the event. Business Recorder reported that the awards were presented at an event attended by representatives from eight South Asian countries.

Gourmet Foods was also recognized at the Pakistan Brands of the Year Awards, where its carbonated soft drinks received the Brand Icon of Pakistan 2025 award in the beverage category. Zubair Nawaz Chattha was additionally named CEO of the Year 2025 in the bakery category.
