= AsiaSat 3S =

Asiasat communications satellite

- Mission type: Communications
- Operator: AsiaSat
- COSPAR ID: 1999-013A
- SATCAT no.: 25657
- Mission duration: 15 years (planned); 26 years, 11 months and 3 days (in progress)

Spacecraft properties
- Spacecraft: AsiaSat 3S
- Spacecraft type: Boeing 601
- Bus: HS-601HP
- Manufacturer: Hughes Space and Communications
- Launch mass: 3,480 kg (7,670 lb)
- Dry mass: 2,500 kg (5,500 lb)
- Dimensions: 3.4 m x 3.5 m x 5.8 m Span: 26.2 m on orbit
- Power: 9.9 kW

Start of mission
- Launch date: 21 March 1999, 00:09:30 UTC
- Rocket: Proton-K / DM-2M
- Launch site: Baikonur, Site 81/23
- Contractor: Khrunichev State Research and Production Space Center
- Entered service: 8 May 1999

Orbital parameters
- Reference system: Geocentric orbit
- Regime: Geostationary orbit
- Longitude: 105.5° East (1999–2014); 120° East (2014–2015); 150.5° East (2015–2016); 146° East (2016–2019)

Transponders
- Band: 44 transponders: 28 C-band; 16 Ku-band
- Coverage area: Asia, the Middle East and Oceania

AsiaSat 3S, was a geosynchronous communications satellite for AsiaSat of Hong Kong to provide communications and television services all across Asia, the Middle East and Oceania.

== Background ==
In March 1998, AsiaSat ordered a replacement satellite, for US$195 million, from Hughes Space and Communications. Designated AsiaSat 3S, the new satellite is a replica of AsiaSat 3.

== Launch ==
AsiaSat 3S was launched for AsiaSat by a Proton-K / DM-2M launch vehicle on 21 March 1999, at 00:09:30 UTC, destined for an orbital location at 105.5° East. A replacement for Asiasat 3, placed in the wrong orbit by a Proton launch in 1997, Asiasat 3S carried C-band and Ku-band transponders. The Blok DM-2M upper stage placed the satellite in a Geostationary transfer orbit (GTO). Asiasat's on-board R4D-11-300 apogee engine was then used to raise perigee to geostationary altitude. It replaced AsiaSat 1 on 8 May 1999.

== Mission ==
It was replaced by AsiaSat 7.
