= Killing of Athar Mateen =

2022 shooting in Karachi, Pakistan

- Location: North Nazimabad, Karachi, Pakistan
- Date: 18 February 2022; 8:29 a.m.
- Attack type: Shooting
- Deaths: 1
- Victim: Athar Mateen
- Perpetrator: Unknown
- Motive: Robbery (according to police and FIR)

Athar Mateen was a senior producer of Samaa TV. On 18 February 2022, 8:29 AM Mateen was killed in a shooting on a car near North Nazimabad Five Star Chowrangi area of Karachi.

According to police and FIR, the incident took place during a robbery while the incident is under investigation. The incident took place at 8:29 a.m., according to CCTV. Matin is survived by two daughters and a wife.

== Reactions ==
- Prime Minister Imran Khan directed that every effort be made to bring the accused to justice. Expressing deep sorrow, he strongly condemned the incident and said that the mourners share in the family's grief.
- Sindh Governor Imran Ismail strongly condemned the killing of Athar Matin and directed Additional IG Karachi to take action for the arrest of the accused. He said that police should ensure the protection of life, property, and honor of citizens while Sindh government should take practical steps to eradicate lawlessness.
- Sindh Chief Minister Syed Murad Ali Shah expressed sorrow over the death of Mateen and took notice of the incident, and demanded an immediate report from Additional IG Karachi. He also directed the concerned authorities to arrest the killers immediately.
