= Sabaoon TV =

Pakistani Pashto-language television channel

- Country: Pakistan
- Broadcast area: Pakistan, Middle East
- Network: Sabaoon Television
- Affiliates: Peshawar, Mardan, Karachi, Islamabad, Saudi Arabia
- Headquarters: Dubai

Programming
- Language: Pashto
- Picture format: 16:9 (1080p, HDTV)

Ownership
- Owner: SIP Media
- Key people: Ali Yousafzai, Ajmal Shah Yousafzai, Ibrahim Daood and Asad Ali

History
- Launched: 17 March 2015

Links
- Website: Official Website

Sabaoon TV is a 24-hour Pashto entertainment television channel based in Pakistan. It began transmitting on 17 March 2015 and carries popular dramas Hiras and Kali Pa Kali. It is the first Pashto high-definition television channel.

== Current programs ==
- Hiras by Bakht Rawan Bakht
- Hujra (Host: Ali Yousafzai & Arshad Qamar) is cultural based program
- Kali Pa Kali (Host: Ajmal khan Yousafzai) is a people and blogs based program
- Common Sense (Host: Wisal Khyal) is an entertainment program in which the common sense questions are asked
- Da Qaam Ghag (Host: Adil Yousafzai & Khalid Ayub) is a current affairs program
- Tesha e Ibrahimi (Host: Ibrahim Daood) a current affairs program
- Saudi Time (Host: Deryab Dolatkhel & Seemab Yousafzai) Entertainment program/interview/function etc

== See also ==
- List of television stations in Pakistan
