= List of music channels in Pakistan =

This is a list of Pakistani music channels. The list includes current and past music channels in Pakistan with their year of launch, closing year, network, headquarter, languages, and slogans arranged alphabetically.

== Channels ==
Channel	Launched	Network	Headquarter	Language(s)	Slogan	Notes
ARY Musik	2003	ARY Digital Network	Karachi	Urdu	You only live once!	Formerly was "The Musik", launched in Dubai by Salman Iqbal.
8XM	2011	Apna Channel	Lahore	Urdu, English	Bharam Se (With trust)	
Jalwa TV	2013	Apna Channel	Lahore	Urdu, Punjabi	Isko Dekho (Watch it)	Known for airing Punjabi music.
Oxygene TV	2009	Classic Entertainment	Karachi	Urdu, English	Let's Breathe Young	Broadcasting in South Asia and the Middle East.
AAG TV	2006	Geo Television Network	Karachi	Urdu	Aagey Barho	It was converted into Geo Kahani.
MTV Pakistan	2006	Viacom & Indus Media Group	Karachi	Urdu	Unknown	Transformed from "Indus Music" in 2006, which was formed in 2003. MTV Pakistan was shut down in 2011.
Play TV	2006	Business Recorder Group	Karachi	Urdu	Live Life, Love Music!	It was converted into "Play Entertainment".
VH1 Pakistan	2008	ARY Digital Network, Viacom & MTV Networks	Karachi	Urdu, English	Unknown	Closed in 2009 due to low ratings amid repeated shows.

== See also ==
- List of television channels in Pakistan
- List of news channels in Pakistan
