= Ahlebait TV =

British Shia Muslim TV channel

- Broadcast area: Asia-Pacific; Europe
- Headquarters: Manchester, United Kingdom

Programming
- Languages: Urdu and English

Ownership
- Owner: Ahlebait TV Networks

History
- Launched: 1 August 2009

Links
- Website: https://ahlebaittv.net/

Ahlebait TV is a Shia Muslim TV channel based in the United Kingdom.

The mission statement on its website stipulated that the main objectives of Ahlebait TV were to educate the humanity by airing various educational, welfare and religious programs.

Coverage on Eutelsat 9A ceased on 7 March 2011; the channel closed completely on 1 September 2011, when it was removed from Eutelsat 28A and Sky channel 836. On 12 December 2011, Ahlebait TV returned to Sky, under new management, using the Eutelsat 28A satellite.

== Channel name ==
The channel name Ahlebait TV refers to the Persian-Urdu term Ahlebait which is a persianisation of the Arabic term Ahl ul-Bayt (Arabic: أهل البيت) which is a phrase denoting Muhammad and his closest family.

== Programmes ==
Ahlebait TV aired Islamic programmes such as Majaalis, Salaam, Marsiyas, Nauhas, Duas and Ziyaraat.

Other programmes include Islamic films and lectures, Quranic programmes, youth programmes and English-language broadcasts.

The following are regular programmes:

- Guftogu Justoju - The face of the TV channel. Molana Hashim Raza Ghadiri presents this thrilling show Mon-Thurs at 9:30pm.
- Tuloo Morning - Start you day with the name of Ahlebait. This interactive morning show hosted by Sayeda Sana Fatima Shah talks about everyday issues.
- Health Tips - An interactive programme that answers your health related questions by Dr. Shazia Shah.
- Fiqh-e-Jaffri - This programme provide information about various aspect of Jaffri Islamic sects. Hosted by Molana Mirza Mohammad Jawad.
- Hamd-o-sana - An interactive programme to recite Hamd, Natt, Manqabat, Noha. This is a live call-in programme.
- Future Azadar - A Children Educational Programme, hosted by Syed Faizan Shah!
- Hamsafar - A matchmaking programme for Muslims of all backgrounds. Host Syeda Nighat Haider.
- Your Views - Live question — answer programme hosted by Sheikh Masomiyyan.
- Ask who know - Live Question — Answer programme hosted by Syeda Saeeda Rizvi, Guest Molana Syed MOhammad Mosavi.
- Aarish - This programme provide beauty tips for Ladies, Hosted by Naheed Solanki.
- Family Time - This programme discuss various issues related to Family life in UK. Host Syeda Najma Abbas Rizvi and Syeda Farah Rizvi
- Kids For Ahlebait - A children's show discussing Islamic matters hosted by Zaki Rizvi
- Gosha-e-Tahzeeb - The programme goes over Ikhlaqi Matters and Hadith of the Ahlebait. Host: Moulana Raza Haider Rizvi
