= AsiaSat 6 =

AsiaSat communications satellite

AsiaSat 6 / Thaicom 7
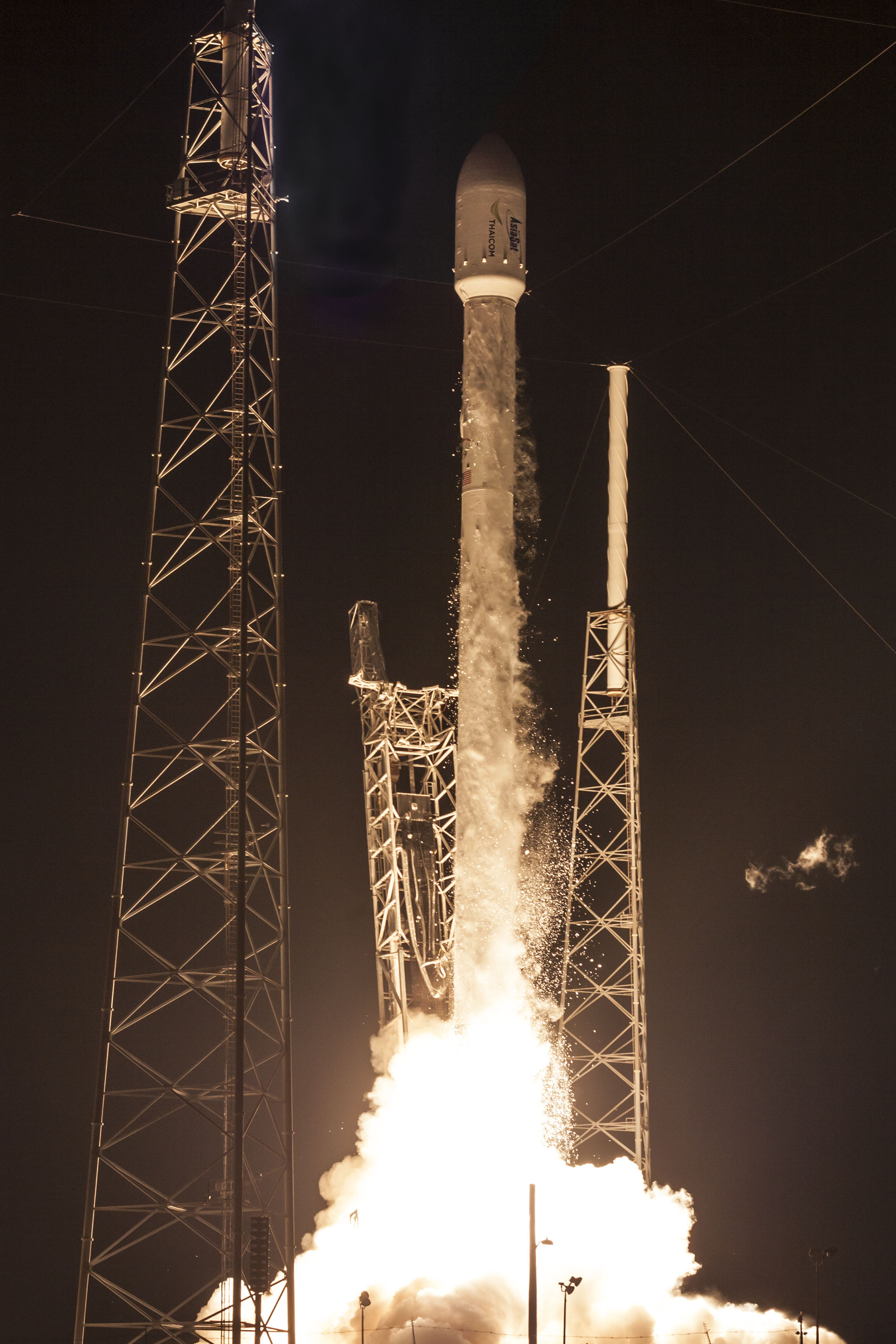
- Launch of AsiaSat 6 satellite on the Falcon 9
- Names: Thaicom 7
- Mission type: Communications
- Operator: AsiaSat
- COSPAR ID: 2014-052A
- SATCAT no.: 40141
- Website: https://www.asiasat.com https://www.thaicom.net/
- Mission duration: 15 years (planned); 11 years, 11 months and 6 days (in progress)

Spacecraft properties
- Spacecraft: Asiasat 6 / Thaicom 7
- Spacecraft type: SSL 1300
- Bus: LS-1300LL
- Manufacturer: Space Systems/Loral
- Launch mass: 3,700 kg (8,200 lb)

Start of mission
- Launch date: 7 September 2014, 05:00:00 UTC
- Rocket: Falcon 9 v1.1
- Launch site: Cape Canaveral, SLC-40
- Contractor: SpaceX
- Entered service: November 2014

Orbital parameters
- Reference system: Geocentric orbit
- Regime: Geostationary orbit
- Longitude: 120° East

Transponders
- Band: 28 C-band
- Bandwidth: 36 MHz
- Coverage area: Asia, Australia, New Zealand

AsiaSat 6 / Thaicom 7 is a geostationary communications satellite which is operated by the Asia Satellite Telecommunications Company (AsiaSat) and was launched into orbit on 7 September 2014. The satellite project was developed in cooperation between satellite operators AsiaSat and Thaicom. AsiaSat owns half of the satellite's 28 transponders which are marketed as AsiaSat 6. The other half of the satellite is owned by Thaicom and is marketed as Thaicom 7. AsiaSat's part of the satellite is operated under license of the China (PRC), whereas Thaicom's part is operated under license of Thailand.

== Satellite description ==
Space Systems/Loral (SS/L), announced in November 2011 that it has been chosen by AsiaSat, to build the AsiaSat 6 and AsiaSat 8 communications satellites. AsiaSat 6 / Thaicom 7 was built by Space Systems/Loral, and is based on the LS-1300LL satellite bus. The satellite carries 28 C-band transponders and is positioned at a longitude of 120° East, providing coverage over southern Asia, Australia and New Zealand.

== Launch ==
SpaceX was contracted to launch AsiaSat 6 / Thaicom 7 using a Falcon 9 v1.1 launch vehicle. The launch took place from Space Launch Complex 40 (SLC-40) at Cape Canaveral Space Force Station (CCSFS) on 7 September 2014, at 01:00 AM EDT (05:00 UTC).

== Falcon 9 Upper stage ==
The Falcon 9 upper stage used to launch AsiaSat 6 / Thaicom 7 was derelict in a decaying elliptical low Earth orbit from September to December 2014. Initially, on 9 September 2014, it orbited with a perigee of 165 km (103 mi) and an apogee of 35,723 km (22,197 mi). One month on, in October 2014, the orbit had decayed to an altitude of 153 km (95 mi) at its closest approach to Earth, and by November 2014 had decayed to a 125 km (78 mi) perigee. The derelict second stage reentered the atmosphere on 28 December 2014.

== Thaicom 7 ==
Satellite fleet operator Thaicom of Thailand has agreed in December 2011 to pay competitor AsiaSat US$171 million over 15 years for the use of one-half of an AsiaSat satellite and placed in a Thai orbital position in an arrangement that permits Thailand to preserve its rights to the orbital position under the agreement, the AsiaSat 6 satellite is at 120° East longitude. Before its launch, AsiaSat and Thaicom placed AsiaSat 2 as an interim satellite at 120° East to retain Thailand's regulatory rights to the orbital position.

== See also ==
- 2014 in spaceflight
- List of Falcon 9 launches
