= Haq TV =

- Country: Pakistan
- Broadcast area: Pakistan
- Network: Haq TV Satellite Channel

Programming
- Picture format: 4:3 (576i, SDTV)

History
- Launched: 2008

Haq TV is an Islamic television channel in Pakistan.

== Programmes ==
- Talawat-e-Quran-e-Pak
- Durs-e-Quran
- Seerat-e-Sahaba
- Nagina or Aap
- Wilayat TV
- Zouq-e-Naat
- Alhudda International
- Rizwan Siddiqui kay Mehman
- Alrahman-Al-Raheem
- News headlines

== See also ==
- Hidayat TV
- Hadi TV
