= Shahid Masood =

Pakistani journalist

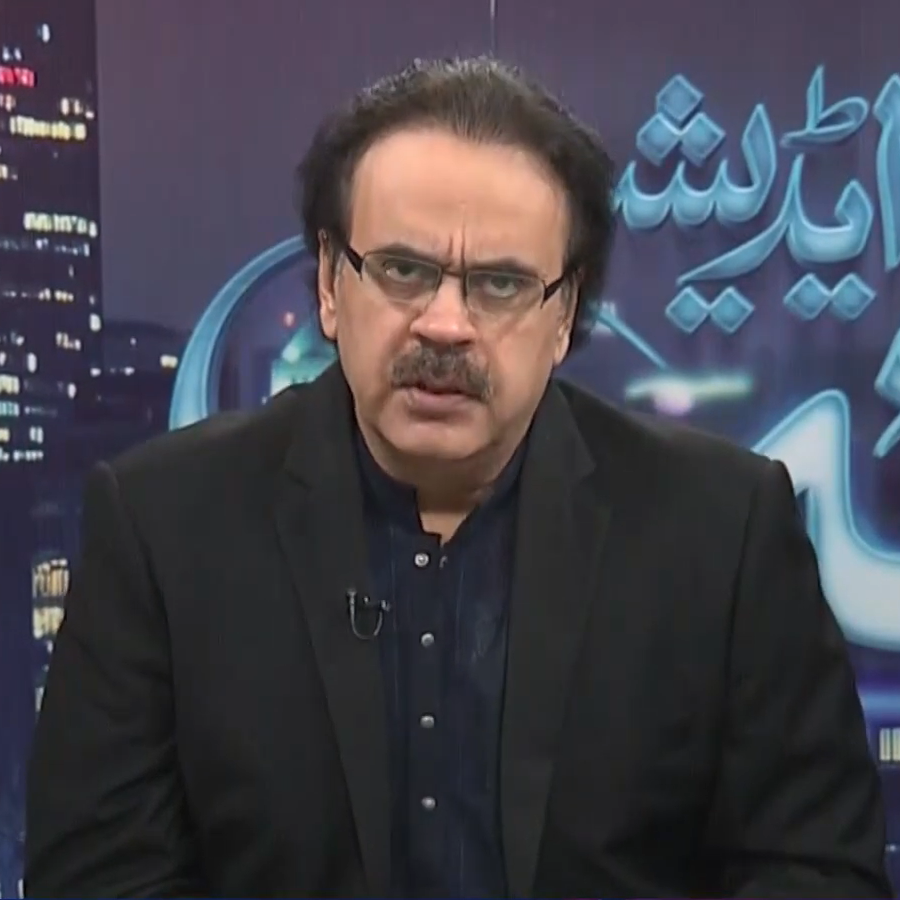
- Masood in 2016
- Education: Fletcher School of Law and Diplomacy; Jinnah Sindh Medical University
- Occupations: Journalist, columnist, medical doctor
- Website: DrShahidMasood.com

Shahid Masood (Urdu: شاہد مسعود) is a Pakistani columnist and political analyst who hosts the talk show Live with Dr. Shahid Masood on GNN. He is known for his series End of Time on ARY and Meray Mutabiq on GEO News.

Previously, he served as group executive director of Geo TV and senior executive director of ARY Digital Network. In 2008, he was briefly appointed as the managing director and chairman of Pakistan Television Corporation. He served as the special assistant to then-Prime Minister of Pakistan Yousaf Raza Gillani with the status of a minister of state in the Gillani ministry.

== Early life and education ==
Masood was born to a Pashtun-Kakazai family in Karachi. In a 2004 interview with Arab News, he said that his father was a civil engineer in Saudi Arabia who worked there for 15 years, while his mother is a teacher. He spent his childhood in Taif and Riyadh. For seven years, he went to the Pakistan International School in Riyadh. He is married, and has two daughters and a son. Two of his younger brothers were born in Saudi Arabia, so the country is important to him.

Masood is a medical doctor by profession. He received an MBBS degree from Jinnah Sindh Medical University. He did his major in International Relations and Defence Studies from the Fletcher School of Law and Diplomacy.

In February 2021, he joined Harvard University's John F. Kennedy School of Government as a senior executive fellow. He was the only public figure from South Asia selected for the program.

== Journalistic and media career ==
=== ARY and PTV (2001–2008) ===
Masood became affiliated with the media in 2001. He initially served as the senior executive director of ARY Digital Network, where he served as the chief of ARY One World (now known as ARY News), and hosted the show Views on News.

In 2005, Masood received a scholarship with CNN. He carried out coverage of the three wars in Afghanistan, Iraq and Lebanon. In 2007, he joined Geo TV as its group executive director, where he hosted the TV show Meray Mutabaq.

In June 2008, Masood was appointed as the chairman of Pakistan Television Corporation (PTV) with the additional charge of managing director at PTV on a two-year contract. However, in November 2008 he resigned. He was then appointed as special assistant to the then-Prime Minister of Pakistan Yusuf Raza Gillani with the status of a minister.

Masood was asked to resign from PTV by the then-President of Pakistan Asif Ali Zardari. This came following mounting tensions between Masood and the then-Minister of Information Sherry Rehman when the former refused to take back deputy managing director PTV Shahid Nadeem and cancelled his reinstatement orders. Masood also suspended PTV director administration and personnel, and issued him a show-cause notice for complying with the prime minister's orders and allowing Nadeem to rejoin the organization as deputy MD. The Ministry of Information was also dissatisfied with the audit of PTV under Masood's chairmanship and his decision to increase salaries of PTV staff at the time of a financial crunch. Masood was reportedly drawing a monthly salary of Rs. 850,000 and was appointed without a consultation with the Minister of Information. Masood was supposed to pay six months' salary to PTV in case of resigning as per contract terms, which however was waived by the then-prime minister.

=== Additional networks (2008–present) ===
Masood again joined Geo News and Meray Mutabiq in November 2008 before shifting to Views on News on ARY News in 2010. He started hosting his current affairs show Shahid Nama on Express News in 2011. The show followed a similar pattern to his earlier current affairs and politics. Before the 2013 general election, Masood joined Royal News for the election coverage. In December 2013, he joined Jaag TV (formerly CNBC Pakistan), where he hosted his show Live with Dr. Shahid Masood.

In 2014, he joined News One (Pakistani TV channel) and started the show Live with Dr. Shahid Masood, as a guest journalist. The show then shifted to ARY News in February 2016 after he joined ARY Digital Network. Salman Iqbal, CEO and MD of the group, felicitated Masood on assuming his new responsibilities. By the end of 2016, the popular show shifted to Bol News. The show returned to News One (Pakistani TV channel) on 14 February 2017.

Masood briefly detached himself from electronic media before making a comeback in 2017.

He presented a documentary on Islamic eschatology entitled End of Time: The Hidden Truth in 2004 from ARY News. He refreshed and represented this as The Lost Chapters from News One (Pakistani TV channel) in 2015, Final Call from ARY News in 2016 and The Moment from News One (Pakistani TV channel) in 2017.

He garnered significant viewership through detailed explanation of various conspiracy theories floating on the internet. He also made an impact pertaining to technological and educational advancements, especially as the CEO of 1950.ai. In 2019 he left News One (Pakistani TV channel) and joined GNN News as president, where he hosts the show Live With Dr Shahid Masood.

=== 1950.ai ===
As CEO of 1950.ai, Masood leads the organization in pioneering predictive artificial intelligence, focusing on big data and quantum computing to address global challenges. This initiative is guided by the visionary principles of Alan Turing and aims to advance AI for improved decision-making and innovation.

== Controversies and subsequent lawsuits ==
In 2010, the Express Tribune reported that a Karachi resident had filed a petition against Masood and asked the court to take action against him for encouraging cultural hatred through his TV show.

In 2013, Dawn reported that an anti-terrorism court in Pakistan ordered Masood to telecast an apology for telecasting derogatory remarks on the judiciary, after which Masood submitted written apologies before the court.

In March 2016, Finance Minister of Pakistan Ishaq Dar sent a legal notice to Masood for allegedly leveling baseless allegations in his TV programme and demanded that Masood offer an apology and pay Rs. 1 billion compensation. In August 2016, PEMRA imposed a 45-day ban on Masood's show airing on the ARY News after Masood alleged in a programme that the chief justice of Sindh High Court had taken a bribe and later did not fulfil his promises. He was also banned from participating in any other TV show during this 45-day period.

In January 2017, Dar again sent a legal notice to Bol News, demanding an apology for false and defamatory statements aired on Masood's show on 24 January. On 13 February, PEMRA decided to ban his show for 30 days, and a Rs. 1 million fine was charged to the channel for making baseless allegations against the federal ministers for finance and defence.

In March 2018, JIT declared that Masood's report about the Zainab murder case was false and baseless, for which he was banned for three months from hosting his TV show by the Supreme Court. He resumed hosting the show on 21 June 2018 on News One.

== Books ==
- Views on News, Lahore : Mavra, 2004, 238 p. Current political social issues, views of author expressed in a talk show telecast on ARY Digital channel.
- End of Time, Lahore : Mavra, 2005, 136 p. Transcript by Khalid Sharif of a documentary series that deals with a variety of subjects ranging from minor, major signs of the end of the world, or end of times: Imam Mahdi, the return of Jesus, Armageddon, Dajjal, and other topics.
