= List of news channels in Pakistan =

This is a list of news channels in Pakistan. These are Pakistani general, business and defunct news channels with their headquarters, launched year, closed year and languages arranged alphabetically.

== Current channels ==
Channels	Language(s)	Launched	Headquarters	Refs
24 Digital	Urdu	May 2015	Lahore	
92 News	Urdu	6 February 2015	Lahore	
Aaj News	Urdu	23 March 2005	Karachi	
Abb Takk News	Urdu	19 April 2013	Karachi	
ARY News	Urdu	26 September 2004	Karachi	
BOL Network	Urdu	2013	Karachi	
Chaupal TV	Punjabi	4 November 2025	Lahore	
Dawn News	Urdu	25 May 2007	Karachi	
Dunya News	Urdu	1 December 2008	Lahore	
Express News	Urdu	1 January 2008	Karachi	
Geo News	Urdu	October 2002	Karachi	
GNN	Urdu	14 August 2018	Lahore	
Hum News	Urdu	6 February 2015	Lahore	
KTN News	Sindhi, Urdu	October 2007	Karachi	
Khyber News	Pashto, Urdu	August 2007	Peshawar	
Mashriq News	Pashto, Urdu	June 2012	Peshawar	
Lahore News	Punjabi, Urdu	1 February 2017	Lahore	
PTV News	Urdu	14 August 2007	Islamabad	
Pakistan TV	English	16 September 2025	Islamabad	
Public News	Urdu	24 June 2018	Lahore	
Samaa TV	Urdu	25 December 2007	Lahore	
Sindh TV	Sindhi, Urdu	October 2004	Karachi	
Such TV	Urdu	23 March 2010	Islamabad	

== Defunct channels ==
Channels	Language(s)	Launched	Closed	Headquarters	Refs
AAG TV	Urdu	September 2006	April 2013	Karachi	
Business Plus	English, Urdu	July 2004	April 2018	Karachi	
Express 24/7	English	5 February 2009	2019	Karachi	
Indus News	English	November 2018	14 September 2021	Lahore	
VSH News	Balochi, Urdu	2004	2020	Karachi	
Waqt News	Urdu	2007	October 2018	Lahore	

== See also ==
- List of television channels in Pakistan
- List of music channels in Pakistan
