= Samaa TV =

Pakistani TV network

Samaa TV HD
- Country: Pakistan
- Broadcast area: Pakistan and Worldwide
- Headquarters: Lahore, Punjab, Pakistan

Programming
- Language: Urdu
- Picture format: (1080p (16:9, HDTV), MPEG-4)

Ownership
- Owner: Aleem Khan

History
- Launched: 25 December 2007; 18 years ago

Links
- Website: www.samaa.tv

Availability

Streaming media
- Samaa TV Live: Watch Live

Samaa TV HD (Urdu: سماء) is a Pakistani Urdu language news channel owned by businessman and politician Aleem Khan.

The word 'Samaa' ("سما") is Urdu for 'sky' or 'heaven' (ultimately derived from the Arabic "سماء"). It is broadcast simultaneously from five major cities of Pakistan – Karachi, Lahore, Islamabad, Quetta and Peshawar.

== History ==
Samaa TV was founded in 2007 by Jaag Broadcasting Systems by Zafar Siddiqi who also founded CNBC Pakistan.

In 2012, Samaa encountered a controversy when a program host conducted a raid on a couple in a park to question their morality. The incident led to the host's dismissal and an official apology from the network.

In 2020, Samaa TV was acquired by a federal minister, Aleem Khan, through his subsidiary real estate company, Park View Limited.

In 2022, Samaa TV producer Athar Mateen was killed during a robbery in North Nazimabad Karachi.

== See also ==
- List of Television Stations in Pakistan
- List of news channels in Pakistan
