= Kuch Kar Dikha =

- Title screen
- Also known as: KKD
- Genre: drama, game show
- Written by: Jawad Daud
- Directed by: Nini
- Presented by: Nokia Pakistan
- Starring: Esa Ch; Jia; Rubab Ali; Abid Hussain; Ali Shah; Aqeel Malik; Fajar Ali; Sehar; Kamran
- Theme music composer: Shankar Mahadevan
- Country of origin: Pakistan
- Original language: Urdu

Production
- Executive producer: Farrukh Malhaar
- Editors: Tahir Waqar; Babar Jehangir
- Running time: 18 minutes

Original release
- Network: ARY Digital
- Release: 28 February 2014

Kuch Kar Dikha (Urdu: کچھ کر دکھا; English: Achieve something remarkable) is a 2014 travel reality show presented by Nokia Pakistan, based on a 38-day journey of 9 people across Pakistan. The show was announced on 18 February along with the launch of Lumia 1520 and 1320. First aired 28 February 2014 on ARY Digital with weekly episodes airing on Fridays.

The contestants were divided into three teams and visited Khewra Mine, Khanpur Dam, Nathia Gali, Balakot, and Muzaffarabad.

The theme song "Kuch Kar Dikha" is sung by Shankar Mahadevan, lyrics and production by Farrukh Malhar and music by Farrukh Abid and Shoaib Farrukh.
