= Daan Mogot City =

Coordinates: 6.156791°S 106.711553°E

- Interactive map of the Daan Mogot City area

General information
- Type: Shopping center Residential
- Architectural style: Modern
- Location: KM. 16 Jalan Desa Semanan, Jalan Daan Mogot, Jakarta, Indonesia
- Construction started: 2016
- Completed: 2018

Design and construction
- Developer: China Communication Construction Group (CCCG)

Daan Mogot City, also known as Damoci, is a mixed development project at Daan Mogot, Jakarta.

The development area has a land area of 16 hectares. The total will be developed in 4 phases.

There are 7 residential towers built on an area of 7 hectares with a shopping mall built on an area of 4 hectares.
