= AsiaSat 5 =

AsiaSat communications satellite

- Mission type: Communications
- Operator: AsiaSat
- COSPAR ID: 2009-042A
- SATCAT no.: 35696
- Website: https://www.asiasat.com
- Mission duration: 15 years (planned); 15 years, 6 months and 22 days (in progress)

Spacecraft properties
- Spacecraft: AsiaSat 5
- Spacecraft type: SSL 1300
- Bus: LS-1300SX
- Manufacturer: Space Systems/Loral
- Launch mass: 3,760 kg (8,290 lb)

Start of mission
- Launch date: 11 August 2009, 19:47:33 UTC
- Rocket: Proton-M / Briz-M
- Launch site: Baikonur, Site 200/39
- Contractor: Khrunichev State Research and Production Space Center
- Entered service: October 2009

Orbital parameters
- Reference system: Geocentric orbit
- Regime: Geostationary orbit
- Longitude: 100.5° East

Transponders
- Band: 40 transponders: 26 C-band; 14 Ku-band
- Coverage area: Asia, Pacific Ocean region

AsiaSat 5 is a Hong Kong communications satellite, which is operated by the Hong Kong–based Asia Satellite Telecommunications Company (AsiaSat). It is positioned in geostationary orbit at a longitude of 100.5° East of the Greenwich Meridian, where it replaced the AsiaSat 2 satellite. It is used to provide fixed satellite services, including broadcasting, telephone and broadband very small aperture terminal (VSAT) communications, to Asia and the Pacific Ocean region.

== Background ==
The launch was originally scheduled to be conducted by Land Launch (SSL-1300LL satellite bus), using a Zenit-3SLB launch vehicle. The satellite was subsequently re-awarded to ILS after Land Launch were unable to guarantee that the satellite could be launched by August 2009, in order to be in orbit before AsiaSat 2 ceased operations.

== Satellite description ==
Space Systems/Loral (SS/L), announced in May 2005 that it has been chosen by AsiaSat. At launch, AsiaSat 5 had a mass of 3,760 kg (8,290 lb), and was expected to operate for fifteen years. It carries 26 C-band and 14 Ku-band transponders.

== Launch ==
AsiaSat 5 was built by Space Systems/Loral, and is based on the LS-1300XS satellite bus. It is being launched by International Launch Services (ILS), using a Proton-M launch vehicle with a Briz-M upper stage. The launch was conducted from Site 200/39 at the Baikonur Cosmodrome in Kazakhstan, at 19:47:33 UTC on 11 August 2009. The Briz-M separated from the Proton-M nine minutes and forty one seconds into the flight, and AsiaSat 5 will separate from the Briz-M into a geosynchronous transfer orbit (GTO) nine hours and fifteen minutes after liftoff. It will then raise itself into its final geostationary orbit.

== See also ==
- AMC-14
