= List of television channels in Pakistan =

Television Network in Pakistan

This is a list of television channels in Pakistan. There are a variety of Pakistani television channels that offer viewers the chance to enjoy their favorite shows and stay up to date with current news and events. Television in Pakistan was introduced in 1964.

== Current channels ==
=== Entertainment ===
==== Balochi ====
- PTV Bolan

==== Kashmiri/Gojri ====
- AJK TV

==== Pashto ====
- Khyber TV

==== Sindhi ====
- Dharti TV
- Kashish
- KTN
- Sindh TV

==== Urdu ====
- A-Plus Entertainment
- Aaj Entertainment
- AAN TV
- Green Entertainment
- ARY Digital
- ARY Zindagi
- BOL Entertainment (HD)
- Express Entertainment
- Geo Entertainment
- Geo Kahani
- Hum Sitaray
- Hum TV (HD)
- PTV Global
- PTV Home
- PTV National
- Urdu 1

=== Religious ===
- ARY Qtv
- Haq TV
- Madani Channel
- Noor TV
- Peace TV Urdu

=== News ===
==== Balochi news ====
- VSH News

==== English news ====
- Pakistan TV

==== Pashto news ====
- Khyber News
- Mashriq TV

==== Punjabi news ====
- Chaupal TV
- Lahore News

==== Sindhi news ====
- Awami Awaz TV
- KTN News
- Sindh TV News

==== Urdu news ====
- 24 Digital
- 92 News
- Aaj News
- ARY News
- BOL News
- Channel 5
- City 41
- City 42
- GNN
- Dawn News
- Dunya News
- Express News
- Geo News
- Geo Tez
- GTV News
- Hum News
- Lahore News
- PTV News
- Public News
- Samaa TV
- Such TV
- Geo Tez

=== Sports ===
- A Sports HD
- Geo Super
- PTV Sports
- Ten Sports

=== Children's ===
- Cartoon Network
- MiniMax
- Pop

=== Music ===
- 8XM
- ARY Musik
- Jalwa TV

=== Food ===
- Masala TV

=== Tourism ===
- Discover Pakistan TV

=== Infotainment ===
- Animal Planet
- Discovery Channel

== Former channels ==
=== Entertainment ===
==== Urdu ====
- ATV (previously known as Channel 3, shut down in 2026)
- Channel 3 (previously known as Shalimar Television Network, replaced by ATV in 2005)
- Hum 2 (replaced by Hum Sitaray)
- Network Television Marketing (Pakistan's first fully private television channel; shut down in 1999)
- PTV Prime (changed its name to Prime TV Asia)
- PTV Two (name changed to PTV World in 1998)
- Shalimar Television Network (previously known as PTN, than changed its name to Channel 3 in 2000, replaced by ATV in 2005)
- The Pakistani Channel (changed its name to ARY Digital)

==== English ====
- HBO Pakistan (closed in October 2020 and replaced by A Sports by ARY)
- WB Channel Pakistan

=== News ===
==== Urdu news ====
- ARY One World (changed its name to ARY News)
- Business Plus (shut down in 2018)
- CNBC Pakistan (replaced by Jaag TV and changed to GNN)
- Indus News (shut down in 2012, then shifted to English language news channel)
- PTV World (returned in 2012, now an English language news channel)

==== English news ====
- Dawn News (shifted to Urdu Programming)
- Express 24/7 (changed its name to Tribune 24/7, replaced by Express Entertainment)
- Geo English (replaced by Geo Tez)
- Indus News (shut down on 14 September 2021)
- Tribune 24/7 (previously known as Express 24/7, replaced by Express Entertainment)

=== Children's ===
- Nickelodeon

=== Music ===
- Aag TV (replaced by Geo Kahani)
- MTV Pakistan (replaced by Indus Music)
- The Musik (replaced by ARY Musik)
- Oxygene TV (shut down in July 2021)
- Play TV (Pakistan) (replaced by Play Max, now known as Play Entertainment)
- VH1 Pakistan (shut down in 2009)

=== Food ===
- ARY Zauq (replaced by ARY Zindagi)
- Masala TV (changed its name to Hum Masala)

=== Fashion ===
- Style 360 (replaced by Hum 2, now Hum Sitaray)

== See also ==
- List of music channels in Pakistan
- List of news channels in Pakistan
