= 24 Digital =

Pakistani news TV channel

24 Digital HD
- Country: Pakistan
- Broadcast area: Pakistan, Bangladesh, Middle East, United States, UAE, UK, Ireland & Americas
- Network: City News Network
- Headquarters: Lahore, Punjab, Pakistan

Programming
- Language: Urdu
- Picture format: (1080p 16:9 MPEG-4, HDTV) (2016–present)

Ownership
- Owner: Mohsin Naqvi; Gohar Ejaz
- Sister channels: City 42; City 41; UK & EU 44; Rohi; City 21; 24 Entertainment HD

History
- Launched: October 22, 2014; 12 years ago
- Founder: Mohsin Naqvi
- Former names: Channel 24 (2014–2016)

Links
- Website: www.24newshd.tv

Availability

Streaming media
- 24 News HD Live: Watch live
- 24 News HD Live on mjunoon.tv: Watch Live

24 Digital HD (Urdu: ٢۴ ڈیجیٹل) is an Urdu Language News & current affairs news television channel based in Lahore, Pakistan, and launched in October 2014. The channel is owned by Mohsin Naqvi who is the founder of City News Network.

== History ==
24 News was founded as a current affairs-focused channel in October 2014 by Mohsin Naqvi. The channel introduced a new format focusing on in-depth analysis and talk shows rather than continuous news bulletins. Naqvi recruited a team of senior journalists and news anchors to implement this approach. The introduction of the new format coincided with a decline in the news media industry in Pakistan and accordingly faced challenges in attracting advertisers and received low ratings. There was also pressure to provide more traditional news coverage. Consequently, Naqvi decided to change the format of 24 News to a conventional 24-hour news channel.

In July 2020, PEMRA suspended the license of television channel 24 News with immediate effect for "illegal transmission of news and current affairs content." PEMRA stated that the channel, originally licensed as Value TV to Central Media Network, had unlawfully rebranded itself as 24 News.

== City News Network ==
- 24 Entertainment HD
- 24 News Digital HD
- City 42 HD
- City 21 HD
- UK & EU 44 HD
- City 41 HD
- Rohi Pakistan HD

== Programming ==
=== Hosts ===
==== Current ====
- Fiza Ali
- Nasim Zehra
- Veena Malik

== See also ==
- List of television stations in Pakistan
- List of news channels in Pakistan
