= Oxygene TV =

Pakistani music channel

Oxygene
- Broadcast area: Pakistan
- Headquarters: Islamabad, Pakistan

Programming
- Language(s): Urdu

Ownership
- Owner: San Media / Aap Media Network
- Sister channels: Indus News

History
- Launched: 24 January 2009
- Replaced: July 2020
- Closed: July 2021; 4 years ago

Links
- Website: oxygene.com.pk

Oxygene was a Pakistani music, lifestyle and entertainment TV channel owned by Classic Entertainment Ltd. Its headquarter is in Karachi. It launched on 24 January 2009 as a premier music and lifestyle channel. The channel relaunched on March 4, 2013, with the slogan "Let's Breathe Young and the logo was updated. Apart from being shown in Pakistan it was also being broadcast in Bosnia and Herzegovina, the UAE and Europe. It also promotes upcoming talent as new persons are often seen on Oxygene. And Now its Relaunched Oxygene For Bahira Town Islamabad Music Channel It Name Slogan Called Kyun Ke Oxygene Zaroori Hai i Shut Down in July 2021

== Shows ==
List of shows that air on Oxygene:

New Shows

- Zukhruf Khan – O2 Sports
- Yumna Anis – Oxygene Channel Chart
- Uzma Azrar – Chalo Baat Karain
- Rasheed Safi – Sathwaan Din
- Ikraan Naqvi – Takraar

Old Shows

- Aftab Iqbal – Khabarzaar
- Hadiqa Kiani – Aap Kay Sitaray
- Agla Station
- Garma Garam With Aap Janab

== Hall of Fame ==
List of singers who their talent on Oxygene:

- Mohsin Abbas Haider
- Ali Pervez
- Sahir Ali Bagga
- Ammar Baig
- Waris Baig
- Navid
- Yasir Akthar
- Soniya Haider
- Arif Lohar
- Wasi Shah

== See also ==
- List of music channels in Pakistan
