= Mohsin Naqvi =

Pakistani politician and media mogul (born 1978)

- محسن نقوی
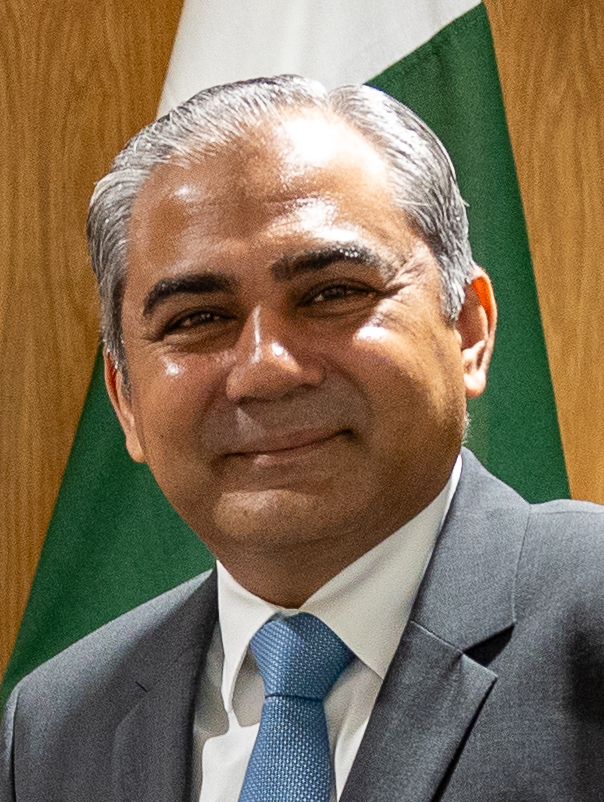
- Naqvi in 2024

40th Minister of Interior
- Incumbent
- Assumed office 11 March 2024
- President: Asif Ali Zardari
- Prime Minister: Shehbaz Sharif
- Preceded by: Gohar Ejaz

Member of the Senate of Pakistan
- Incumbent
- Assumed office 9 April 2024
- Constituency: Punjab

37th Chairman of Pakistan Cricket Board
- Incumbent
- Assumed office 6 February 2024
- Appointed by: Anwaar ul Haq Kakar
- President: Arif Alvi; Asif Ali Zardari
- Prime Minister: Anwaar ul Haq Kakar; Shehbaz Sharif
- Preceded by: Zaka Ashraf

30th President of the Asian Cricket Council
- Incumbent
- Assumed office 3 April 2025
- Deputy: Pankaj Khimji
- Preceded by: Shammi Silva

Chief Minister of Punjab
- Caretaker
- In office 22 January 2023 – 26 February 2024
- Governor: Baligh Ur Rehman
- Preceded by: Parvez Elahi
- Succeeded by: Maryam Nawaz

Personal details
- Born: 28 October 1978 (age 48) Lahore, Punjab, Pakistan
- Party: Independent (2024–present)
- Spouse: Warda Ashraf
- Children: 4
- Education: Government College University, Lahore; Ohio University

Syed Mohsin Raza Naqvi (Note: Urdu: سید محسن رضا نقوی) (born 28 October 1978) is a Pakistani politician and media mogul who has served as the federal Minister of Interior and Narcotics Control since March 2024, and the chairman of the Pakistan Cricket Board since February 2024. He is also currently serving as the president of the Asian Cricket Council since April 2025. He has been a senator from Punjab since April 2024.

Prior to these roles, he was the caretaker chief minister of Punjab from January 2023 to February 2024. Naqvi is widely regarded as one of Pakistan’s most powerful civilian figures, wielding such influence that sometimes extends beyond the direct authority of Prime Minister Shehbaz Sharif.

Apart from politics, Naqvi is also the founder of the City Media Group, which operates a number of television channels including City 42 and 24 News.

== Early life and education ==
Syed Mohsin Raza Naqvi was born on 28 October 1978 in Lahore, Punjab, Pakistan into a Punjabi Shia Muslim family with ancestral roots in Jhang. Orphaned at a young age, he was raised by his maternal uncle.

Naqvi received his primary education from the Crescent Model Higher Secondary School. He later attended Government College University (GCU) before moving to the United States to pursue higher education at Ohio University, where he earned a degree in journalism.

== Media career ==
Following his studies, Naqvi began his career with an internship at the American cable news channel, CNN. He was subsequently assigned to cover Pakistan as a producer and was later promoted to regional head for South Asia during the period following the 9/11 attacks. In 2009, while Naqvi was associated with CNN, allegations of bribery were made against him in relation to a Rs 9 billion fraud case involving Haris Steel Mills owner. It was reported that Naqvi had accepted a payment of Rs 3.5 million from the owner of Haris Steel, Sheikh Afzal. The purpose of the alleged payment was reportedly to facilitate an acquittal in the Supreme Court by leveraging purported connections with a Lahore High Court judge. He continued to report on the region for CNN until 2009.

In 2009, Naqvi founded the City News Network, with C42 as its first television channel which was later renamed as City 42. The media group later expanded to include additional television channels such as 24 News, Channel 21, City 41, Rohi, as well as a newspaper. The network also established an international presence with the launch of C44, a channel based in the United Kingdom.

== Political career ==
=== Caretaker Chief Minister of Punjab (2023–2024) ===
In 2023, Naqvi was nominated for the position of Caretaker Chief Minister of Punjab by Hamza Shahbaz, the Leader of the Opposition in the Provincial Assembly of the Punjab. Following a deadlock between the outgoing provincial government and the opposition, the Election Commission of Pakistan (ECP) appointed Naqvi to the role on 22 January 2023. Naqvi assumed office the same day, and an eight-member caretaker provincial cabinet was inaugurated on 27 January 2023. Naqvi's appointment drew criticism, particularly from the Pakistan Tehreek-e-Insaf (PTI). On 28 January 2023, the PTI filed a petition against the appointment in the Supreme Court. The petition requested that the court prevent Naqvi from forming a cabinet or exercising administrative duties, arguing that the ECP had breached its constitutional obligations. On 29 January, Punjab Advocate General Ahmad Awais stated that Naqvi had carried out illegal transfers and dismissals of officers in law enforcement, allegedly to benefit the Pakistan Muslim League (N) and Pakistan Democratic Movement in the upcoming elections. On 12 February, Naqvi was accused of breaching the election code of conduct by participating in the groundbreaking ceremony for the Bab-e-Pakistan project.

On 14 February 2023, Naqvi stated he had no intention of extending his tenure, noting the constitutional term for a caretaker government is 60 to 90 days. A petition was later filed in the Lahore High Court on 29 April, arguing that Naqvi's term had expired and he was unlawfully occupying the office.

Following the 2024 Pakistani general election on 8 February, Parvez Elahi accused Naqvi of being a "culprit behind stealing the mandate of the citizens." Naqvi convened a final farewell meeting of the Punjab provincial cabinet on 23 February 2024.

=== Interior Minister of Pakistan (2024–present) ===
In March 2024, reports emerged that Mohsin Naqvi was being considered for the position of Interior Minister in Shehbaz Sharif's federal cabinet. The nomination was initially met with denials from the PML-N and PPP. A senior PML-N leader stated Naqvi was not their party's candidate, while a PPP leader referred to him as "Rawalpindi's man," a term understood to reference the Pakistani military establishment.

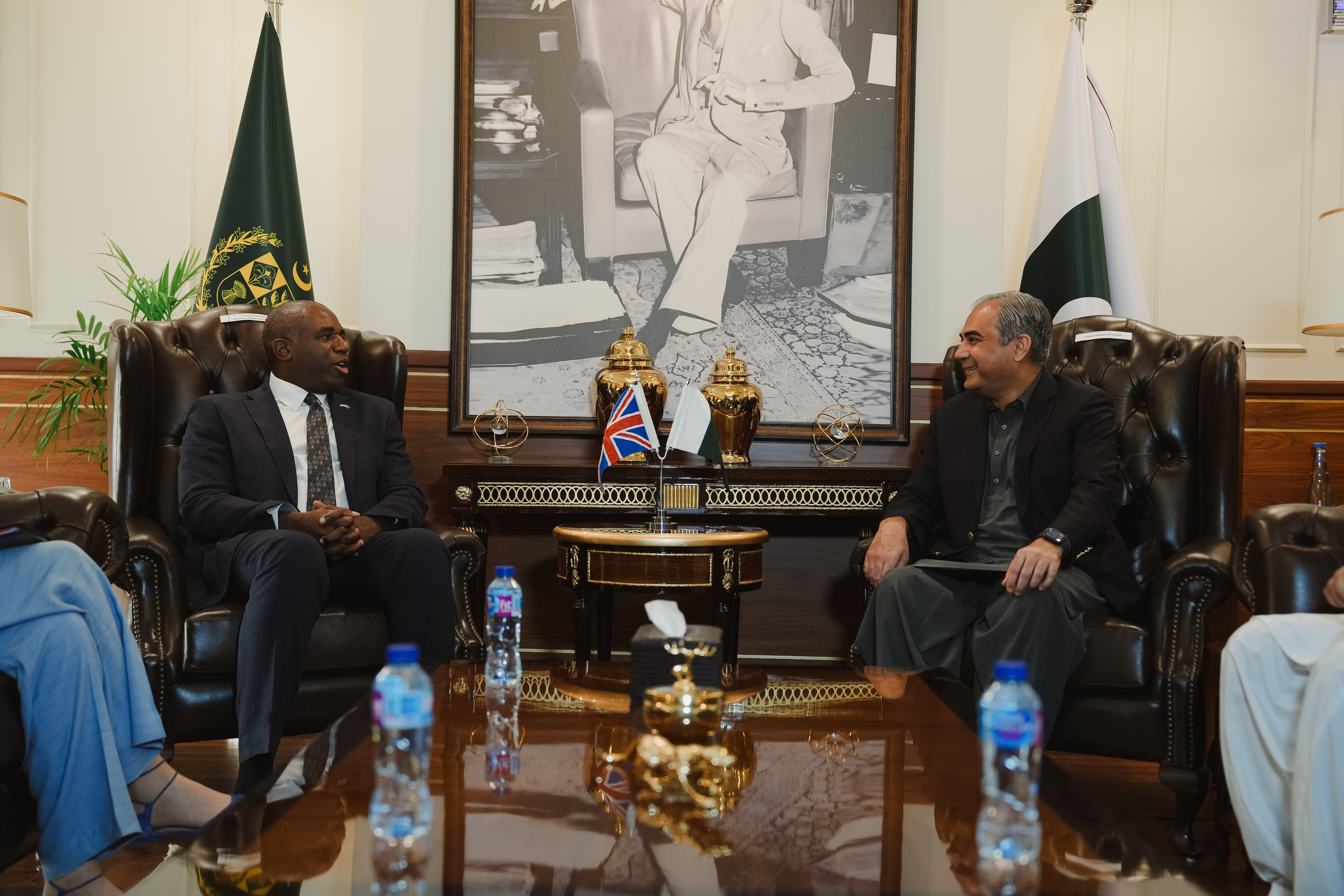
Naqvi with British Foreign Secretary David Lammy, May 2025

On 11 March 2024, Naqvi was sworn in as the Federal Minister for Interior and Narcotics Control. To hold a full federal ministerial portfolio, he announced his candidacy for the 2024 Senate election as an independent. His nomination received the backing of the ruling coalition parties, including the PML-N, PPP, PML-Q, and the Istehkam-e-Pakistan Party. He was sworn in as a member of the Senate on 8 April 2024.

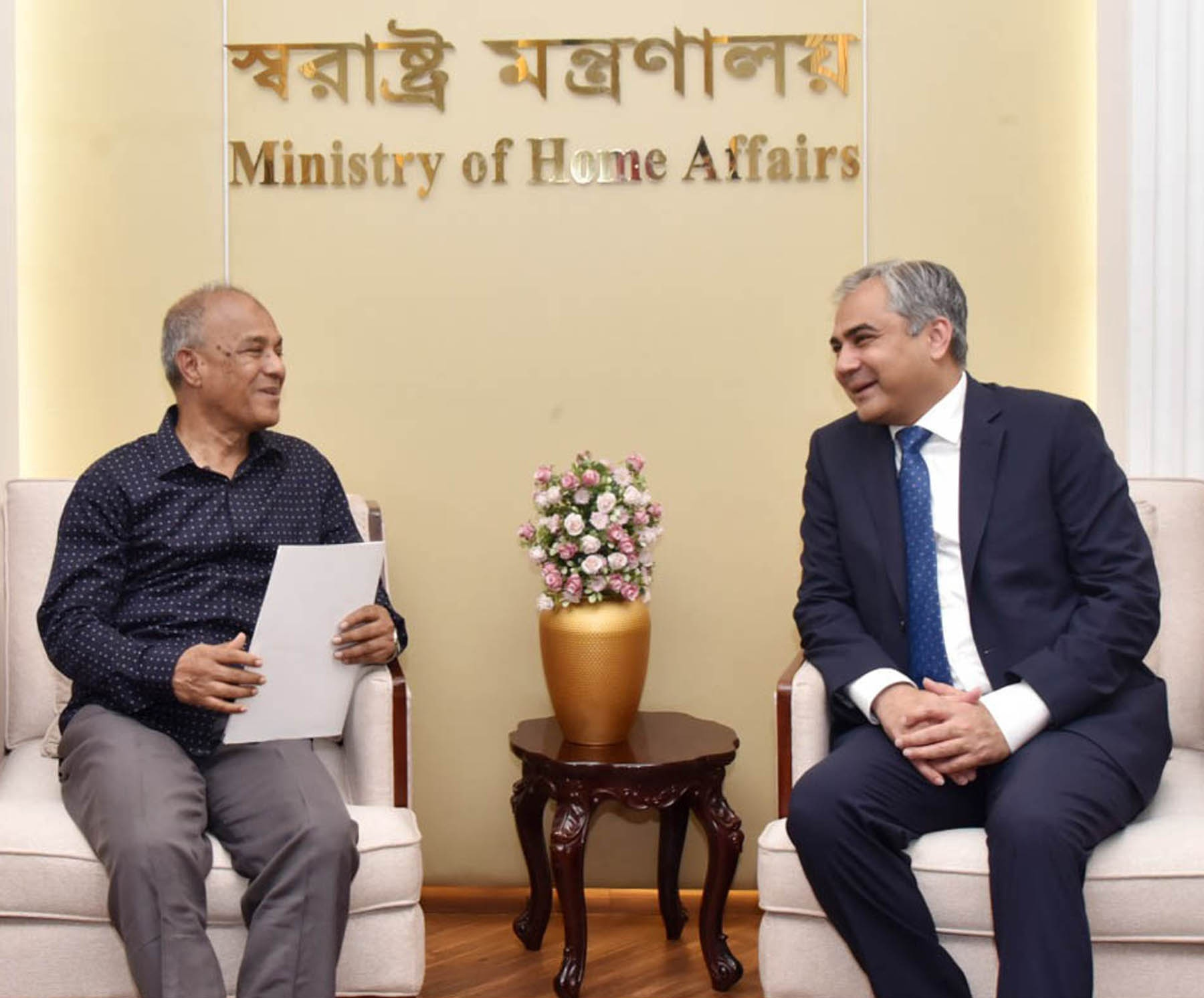
Naqvi with Bangladeshi Advisor for Home Affairs Jahangir Alam Chowdhury, July 2025

In March 2024, a petition was filed by Hamid Khan in the Supreme Court on behalf of Imran Khan, calling for a judicial commission to investigate rigging in the 2024 election. The petition also requested an investigation into Naqvi for alleged constitutional violations and sought his trial for high treason. In an April 2024 interview, Imran Khan described Naqvi as a "viceroy" and alleged he was part of a "London Plan" to undermine his party. On 8 April 2024, Qaisera Elahi, wife of Pervaiz Elahi, and Sumaira Elahi, sister of Shujaat Hussain, publicly accused Naqvi of contributing to a political rift within their family. On 26 April, during a session of the National Assembly, Leader of the Opposition Omar Ayub Khan and other PTI leaders criticized Naqvi's election as an independent senator and his previous role as caretaker chief minister. In May 2024, PML-N Senator Afnan Ullah Khan stated that the party's support for an independent candidate like Naqvi was a continuation of a "hybrid system" and was a decision made by Nawaz Sharif against the wishes of most of the party.

On 26 November 2024, a large protest organized by the Pakistan Tehreek-e-Insaf (PTI) took place in Islamabad. Days prior, as Interior Minister, Naqvi had stated that strict action, potentially with military assistance, would be taken if the protest proceeded. On the day of the protest, clashes occurred which reportedly resulted in the deaths of 14 civilians and 4 security personnel. Following the incident, allegations were made against Naqvi and Federal Information Minister Attaullah Tarar regarding their alleged role in the events that led to the casualties.

During a visit to the United States in January 2025, an incident occurred that prompted Pakistan's Ministry of Foreign Affairs to issue a public clarification of its stance on the One China principle. The clarification came after Naqvi attended an event organized by the New Federal State of China, a U.S.-based lobby group advocating for the end of Communist Party rule in China, leading to criticism of his actions.⁣

In December 2025, a controversy surrounding Naqvi emerged after media claimed that, during a closed-door meeting with the British High Commissioner, he proposed that Pakistan would accept the return of two Rochdale grooming gang ringleaders only if the United Kingdom extradited political dissidents sought by Islamabad. The alleged proposal drew criticism in both countries, with concerns that figures such as Shahzad Akbar and Adil Raja could face political persecution if returned to Pakistan, and British politicians insisting that Pakistan should repatriate its nationals without conditions. Naqvi said that Pakistan cannot tolerate people abroad defaming its institutions and would welcome British help in returning those who spread "anti-Pakistan propaganda."

In June 2026 Naqvi, as Pakistan’s Interior Minister and prominent member of the country’s Shiite minority, played a pivotal role as a mediator and personal envoy in negotiations the during the Iran–Israel conflict after the USA under president Trump and Israel attacked Iran on 28 February 2026. Naqvi delivered a letter from Pakistan's army chief and prime minister to the Supreme Leader of Iran Mojtaba Khamenei. Naqvi acted as a bridge between the US and Iran to facilitate the historic Islamabad Memorandum between the United States of America and the Islamic Republic of Iran in Bürgenstock, Switzerland during the Iran war ceasefire.

== Administration career ==
=== Chairman of the Pakistan Cricket Board ===
On 22 January 2024, caretaker Prime Minister Anwaar ul Haq Kakar appointed Mohsin Naqvi to the governing board of the Pakistan Cricket Board (PCB). While still serving as the caretaker Chief Minister of Punjab, Naqvi was elected unopposed as the 37th chairman of the PCB on February 6 for a three-year term. His appointment, which came shortly before the 2024 Pakistan Super League and the general election, was met with criticism from some quarters regarding his limited experience in cricket administration.

In March 2024, the National Cricket Selection Committee was reorganized under Naqvi's chairmanship. The previous structure, led by a single individual, was replaced by a seven-member committee in which each member holds equal voting authority. During Naqvi's tenure, the performance of the Pakistan national cricket team has declined and has faced public and political scrutiny. One of his decision that attracted criticism was the reinstatement of Babar Azam as the captain for limited-overs cricket.

Following Pakistan's early exit from the 2024 ICC Men's T20 World Cup, which included losses to the USA and India, Naqvi stated that the team required "major surgery." The performance led to widespread criticism of the PCB's management. Criticism intensified following a series defeat against Bangladesh in August–September 2024. The outcome prompted members of both the National Assembly and the Senate to call for Naqvi's resignation as PCB chairman. During parliamentary sessions, lawmakers also criticized his performance as Interior Minister and made allegations of corruption related to sports and immigration.

=== President of the Asian Cricket Council ===
In April 2025, Naqvi took charge as the President of the Asian Cricket Council.

After the 2025 Asia Cup final, the Indian team refused to receive the trophy from Naqvi. The presentation ceremony was cancelled, and the trophy and medals were removed from the venue. BCCI secretary Devajit Saikia stated, "We have decided not to take the Asia Cup trophy from the ACC chairman, who happens to be one of the main political leaders of Pakistan," adding, "that does not mean that the gentleman will take away the trophy along with the medals," describing the situation as "unfortunate". Naqvi stated, "Let me make it absolutely clear: I have done nothing wrong....As ACC President, I was ready to hand over the trophy that very day and I am still ready now. If they truly want it, they are welcome to come to the ACC office and collect it from me."

== Personal life ==
Naqvi married Warda Ashraf, who comes from a prominent political family within Punjab. They have a son and three daughters. They are prominent member of Pakistan’s sizeable Shia minority. She is the daughter of Ashraf Marth, the late Senior Superintendent of the Punjab Police in Gujranwala, who was assassinated in 1997 by a takfiri anti-Shia militants. In May 1997, Marth was gunned down because he was making progress in his investigation into the murder of Agha-e Rahimi, Iran’s Cultural Attache in Multan. Marth was the brother-in-law of Pervaiz Elahi, a former Chief Minister of Punjab and a heavyweight in Pakistani politics. However, despite their relationship, Elahi rejected his appointment as caretaker Chief Minister of Punjab, stating that he would approach the Supreme Court regarding the Election Commission's decision to appoint him to this position. Naqvi is reported to have close ties with President Asif Ali Zardari.

In May 2024, his wife's name surfaced in a data leak disclosing her ownership of properties in Dubai (Dubai Leaks).
