= VSH News =

Baloch TV channel in Pakistan

VSH News HD
- Country: Pakistan
- Broadcast area: South Asia
- Headquarters: Karachi, Sindh, Pakistan

Programming
- Languages: Balochi, Urdu
- Picture format: (1080p (16:9, MPEG-4, HDTV)

Ownership
- Owner: Visionary Group

History
- Launched: 2009; 17 years ago

Links
- Webcast: www.vshnews.tv/live/
- Website: www.vshnews.tv

VSH News HD (Balochi: وش خبر) was a Baloch cable and satellite news network based in Karachi, Sindh, Pakistan.

In 2020, its transmission was suspended apparently over financial reason, as there had been calls for the provincial and federal governments to grant advertisements to the network.

== See also ==
- List of news channels in Pakistan
