= Paksat-1R =

Pakistani communications satellite

- Names: Paksat-1 Replacement
- Mission type: Communications
- Operator: PAKSAT International
- COSPAR ID: 2011-042A
- SATCAT no.: 37779
- Website: https://paksat.com.pk/
- Mission duration: 15 years (planned); 15 years, 1 month and 25 days (in progress)

Spacecraft properties
- Spacecraft: Paksat-1R
- Spacecraft type: DongFangHong
- Bus: DFH-4
- Manufacturer: China Great Wall Industry Corporation (CGWIC)
- Launch mass: 5,115 kg (11,277 lb)
- Dry mass: 2,100 kg (4,600 lb)
- Dimensions: 2.36 m x 2.10 m x 3.60 m
- Power: 10.5 kW

Start of mission
- Launch date: 11 August 2011, 16:15:04 UTC
- Rocket: Chang Zheng 3B/E
- Launch site: Xichang, LC-2
- Contractor: China Academy of Launch Vehicle Technology (CALT)
- Entered service: October 2011

Orbital parameters
- Reference system: Geocentric orbit
- Regime: Geostationary orbit
- Longitude: 38° East

Transponders
- Band: 30 transponders: 12 C-band; 18 Ku-band
- Coverage area: Pakistan, South Asia, Central Asia, Eastern Europe, East Africa, Far East

Paksat-1R (or Paksat-1 Replacement) is a geosynchronous communications satellite that was manufactured by China Great Wall Industry Corporation (CGWIC) and operated by the Space and Upper Atmosphere Research Commission (SUPARCO), an executive space authority of the Government of Pakistan.

== History ==
=== Paksat-1 ===
In December 2001, the SUPARCO negotiated to lease the Palapa-C1 satellite and designated it as Paksat-1 in an attempt to avert the orbital position crises. It was acquired after an anomaly in the electrical system of the satellite on 24 November 1998. A module for controlling the hydro accumulators had failed and an American contractor, Hughes Global Services (HGS), managed to develop a strategy that allowed the continued use of the satellite in geostationary orbit. The satellite was eventually leased by Pakistan as Paksat-1 at 38° East in geostationary orbit and had been active since December 2002. During this time, the SUPARCO began developing the geosynchronous satellite to replace the aging Paksat-1 as part of the new space policy announced by the government of Pakistan in 2008.

=== Prototype ===
In 2008, a prototype of Paksat-1R was developed by SUPARCO at its Satellite Research and Development Centre (SRDC) in Lahore. The project was aimed to enhance the knowledge and technical expertise of young scientists and engineers about communications satellite engineering. The Paksat-1R prototype has three C-band transponders as the communication payload. All the subsystems have been designed and developed locally in Pakistan. System integration and testing have also been performed. SUPARCO reported that the project was completed in three years.

== Satellite construction ==
The PakSat-1R was developed by the China Great Wall Industry Corporation (CGWIC), and financial funding came from the Chinese government. Contract for satellite purchase was made on 15 October 2008 with CGWIC. It was China's first satellite in-orbit delivery contract signed with an Asian customer.

Before launching the satellite spent around 18 days undergoing laboratory tests in China. The Paksat-1R was developed and built as a geostationary telecommunications satellite. Launched on the Long March 3B launch vehicle, the satellite has a design life of 15 years with initial goals to provide broadband internet access, digital television broadcasting, remote and rural telephony, emergency communications, tele-education and tele-medicine services across South Asia and Central Asia, Eastern Europe, East Africa and the Far East. The satellite was launched on 11 August 2011 and successfully took over the operations of its predecessor, the Paksat-1 satellite leased by Pakistan, in geostationary orbit at 38° East.

== Program Objectives & Deliverables ==
The strategic and commercial objectives of the project are:

- To replace PakSat-1 with the help of reputed international satellite manufacturer.
- To establish, maintain and operate necessary ground control facilities for controlling PakSat-1R locally.
- To market PakSat-1R transponder capacity.
- Acquire relevant know-how and technology and train available human resource.
- To increase tele-density and spreading telecommunication services across country.
- To Facilitate GoP's e-government, e-commerce, e-learning, e-health initiatives.
- To Facilitate emergency communication needs e.g. in disasters like earthquakes, floods etc.

The main deliverables of the project were:

- Space Segment of PakSat-1R
- Ground Control Segment ( Two locations)
- Know-How and Technology Transfer (KHTT)
- Consultancy
- Communication Module FM AIT

== Launch ==
PAKSAT-1R was launched at 16:15:04 UTC on 11 August 2011 aboard China's Long March 3B (CZ-3B) launch vehicle from the Xichang Satellite Launch Centre in China's Sichuan Province. The launch was witnessed by, among others, Pakistan's Secretary Defence, Lt. Gen. Syed Athar Ali (retd), Secretary Foreign Affairs, Salman Bashir, Director General, Strategic Plans Division, Lt. Gen. Khalid Ahmed Kidwai (retd) and the Ambassador of Pakistan to China, Muhammad Masood Khan.

== Specifications ==
The Paksat-1R satellite is based on the DFH-4 satellite bus, with a launch mass of 5,115 kg (11,277 lb). The satellite has 30 transponders: 18 in Ku-band and 12 in C-band. To ensure high degree of reliability/availability of the system, two fully redundant Satellite Ground Control Stations (SGCS) were established in Karachi and Lahore, one to act as the main and the other as backup respectively.

The DFH-4 (DongFangHong-4) satellite bus is a large telecommunications satellite platform – a new generation of hardware based on high output power and communication capacity, ranking alongside international advanced satellite platforms. The applications for the DFH-4 platform aren't limited to high-capacity broadcast communication satellites and can be used to tracking and data relay satellites, regional mobile communication satellites, etc. The satellite bus comprises propulsion module, service module and solar array. It has a payload capacity of 588 kg and an output power of 10.5 kW by the end of its lifetime. Its design lifetime is 15 years and its reliability by the end of its lifetime is more than 0.78. Pakistan-provided payload is of non-critical nature with a weight limit of 50 kilograms and a power requirement of no more than 300 watts.

Based on versatility, inheritance, expandability and promptness principles and mature technology, the platform will meet the needs of international and domestic large communication satellite markets. The satellite is equipped with three receiver antennas and two transmission antennas. It can support the transmission of 150-200 television programs simultaneously to ground users using a 45 cm (18 in) antenna device.

== Reception ==
The reception perceived in the Pakistan science community and the country at large was generally positive. However, leading scientists in Pakistan criticised SUPARCO for not being able to launch the satellite from Pakistan's Flight Space Center and questions were raised whether the space programme is on the right track.

== See also ==
- Paksat-1
- Paksat-MM1R
