= 2015 in Pakistani television =

The following is a list of events affecting Pakistani television in 2015. Events listed include television show debuts, and finales; channel launches, and closures; stations changing or adding their network affiliations; and information about changes of ownership of channels or stations.

== Television programs debuting in 2015 ==
=== Hum TV ===
| Name | Run |
|---|---|
| Dayar-e-Dil | 17 March 2015 |
| Karb | 4 May 2015 |
| Kitna Satatay Ho | 17 May 2015 |
| Mol | 30 May 2015 |
| Ishq Ibadat | 21 July 2015 |
| Akeli | 21 July 2015 |
| Tum Mere Paas Raho | 22 July 2015 |
| Mohabbat Aag Si | 22 July 2015 |
| Tumhari Natasha | 24 July 2015 |
| Kaisay Tum Se Kahoon | 26 July 2015 |
| Sangat | 20 August 2015 |
| Tumhare Siwa | 21 August 2015 |
| Aik Thi Misaal | 14 September 2015 |
| Mera Dard Na Janay Koi | 14 October 2015 |
| Maan | 19 October 2015 |
| Preet Na Kariyo Koi | 3 November 2015 |
| Gul-e-Rana | 7 November 2015 |
| Ishq-e-Benaam | 9 November 2015 |
| Tere Mere Beech | 29 November 2015 |
| Tere Baghair | 3 December 2015 |
| Maana Ka Gharana | 9 December 2015 |
| Sehra Main Safar | 18 December 2015 |
| Abro | 20 December 2015 |

=== ARY Digital ===
- Maamta (18 February 2015)
- Tumse Mil Kay (19 February 2015)
- Ishq Parast (19 February 2015)
- Babul Ki Duaein Leti Ja (21 April 2015)
- Dil Nahi Manta (15 November 2015)

Weekly Soaps:

- Dugdugi (2011)
- Family Band (TV series) (2 May 2015)
- Madventures (22 February 2013)

Daily Soaps:

- Dil-e-Barbad (16 February 2015)
- Guriya Rani (6 April 2015)
- Mujhe Qubul Hai (27 April 2015)

Serials:

- Aitraz (11 August 2015)
- Khatoon Manzil (30 July 2015)
- Meray dard ki tujhe kya khabar
- Mere Ajnabi (29 July 2015)
- Mere jeevan sathi
- Paiwand (11 April 2015)
- Rang Laaga (11 March 2015)
- Tere dar par
- Woh Ishq Tha Shayed (16 March 2015)
- Zinda Dargor (11 May 2015)

== Television programs ending in 2015 ==
=== Hum TV ===
- Karb (12 October 2015)
- Ishq Ibadat (13 October 2015)
- Dayar-e-Dil (27 October 2015)
- Mol (31 October 2015)
- Akeli (5 November 2015)
- Kitna Satatay Ho (22 November 2015)
- Tum Mere Paas Raho (2 December 2015)
- Mohabbat Aag Si (2 December 2015)
- Tumhari Natasha (11 December 2015)
- Kaisay Tum Se Kahoon (13 December 2015)

=== ARY Digital ===
- Ishq Parast (23 July 2015)

== Channels ==
Launches:

- Unknown: 24 Digital
- Unknown: 92 News
- 17 March: Sabaoon TV
- 1 December: Aaj Entertainment
- 1 December: Play Entertainment
