= Indus News =

Pakistani TV channel

Indus News HD (Pakistan)
- Type: News channel
- Country: Pakistan
- Broadcast area: Asia, Europe, Pakistan, Middle East
- Network: Aap Media Network
- Headquarters: Islamabad, Pakistan

Programming
- Language: English
- Picture format: HD

Ownership
- Owner: AAP Media / SAN Media (Pvt) Ltd
- Sister channels: Oxygene

History
- Launched: November 2018; 7 years ago
- Closed: 14 September 2021; 5 years ago (temporarily)

Links
- Website: Official website

Availability

Streaming media
- YouTube: Watch Live

Indus News was an English language Pakistani international news channel launched in November 2018, part of Aap Media Network, broadcast on Paksat and based in Islamabad.

The channel, which closed in 2021, supposedly temporarily, did not have any connection to the now defunct Pakistani media organisation Indus Media Group which also owned an Urdu-language news channel called Indus News in the 2000s.

== History ==
Indus News was owned by Pakistani business tycoon and founder of Bahria Town, Malik Riaz. Its chief executive officer was Saniya Malik.

On 14 September 2021, the channel temporarily suspended operations, citing "unavoidable legal and technical issues". It was the second of Riaz's suspended channels, after Aap News.

== AAP Media / SAN Media (Pvt) Ltd ==
- Indus News (English News)
- Aap News (Urdu News)
- Aap Entertainment (Urdu)
- Oxygene (Music)
- Dugdugi (Comedy)

== See also ==
- List of news channels in Pakistan
