= MTV (Pakistani TV channel) =

Pakistani music channel

MTV Pakistan
- Final logo used from 1 July 2010 to 1 October 2011
- Country: Pakistan
- Broadcast area: Pakistan; Sri Lanka
- Headquarters: Karachi

Programming
- Picture format: 4:3/16:9 (576i, SDTV)

Ownership
- Owner: Viacom & Indus
- Sister channels: VH1 Pakistan; Nickelodeon

History
- Launched: 22 November 2006; 19 years ago
- Closed: 1 October 2011; 15 years ago
- Replaced by: Indus music

MTV Pakistan was the Pakistani subsidiary of MTV, a cable television network owned by Viacom. The Pakistan franchise was set up in collaboration with Pakistan's first satellite channel media group known as Indus Media Group (Indus TV). Indus TV was Pakistan's second private television broadcaster after STN.

== Programming ==
MTV Pakistan combined local and international music and was the only music channel with global and local programs. The channel broadcast Pakistani shows such as MTV Basanti, Most Wanted, MTV Select, Bheja Fry, Love Lockdown, Love Stories, Top Ten World Music , MTV Classics, MTV Requested, MTV News, MTV VJ Hunt, Groove and Classics. International shows included MTV Unplugged, MTV Roadies, Stunt Mania.

MTV Pakistan provided upcoming and talented Pakistani artists with an opportunity to get global recognition.

== VJs ==
- Syra Yousuf
- Anoushey Ashraf
- Mahira Khan
- Ayesha Omar
- Ali Safina
- Madiha Imam
- Fiza Ali

== See also ==
- List of music channels in Pakistan
- MTV Networks Asia Pacific
- Music of Pakistan
- List of television channels in Pakistan
