= Hidayat TV =

- Broadcast area: Worldwide
- Headquarters: Manchester, United Kingdom

Programming
- Languages: Urdu and English
- Picture format: 4:3 (576i, SDTV)

Ownership
- Owner: Hidayat Television Ltd

History
- Launched: 16 December 2008

Links
- Website: www.hidayattv.uk

Availability

Streaming media
- Live Webcast: www.livestream.com/hidayat

Hidayat TV is an Islamic satellite TV channel based in the United Kingdom. It is notable for being the first Shia Muslim channel in the United Kingdom and Europe.

According to the mission statement on its website the objectives of Hidayat TV includes developing the Muslim community by covering various educational, welfare and religious needs.

Hidayat TV was established by two Islamic scholars Moulana Ghulam Hussain Adeel and Maulana Syed Abbas Abedi along with Dr. Ghulam Hadi Kadiwal and Sakhawat Hussain Shah. Hidayat TV initially aired parts daily but became a full-time 24-hour running channel from 16 February 2009.

Hidayat TV launched globally on 5 December 2009 reaching audiences in UK, Europe and parts of North Africa via Eutelsat 28A.

== Channel name ==
The channel name Hidayat TV refers to the Arabic word Hidayat (Arabic: هدايت) which literally means Guidance. It is a term used repeatedly in the Quran referring to divine guidance.

== Mission statement ==
According to its website the channel mission and objectives include the following:

- To educate the Islamic Community on its rights and responsibilities
- To assist the Islamic Community in the resolution of its social, economic, cultural and religious needs
- To create and promote the spirit of unity and brotherhood among the members of the Community and settle disputes
- To promote actively the principle of multiculturalism
- To provide a wider platform for those who love to establish peace and harmony on earth
- To show the real face of the Holy Quran and Sunnah according to the teachings of the Holy Prophet Mohammed and his Holy Progeny
- To build a bridge between Western and Eastern culture through healthy dialogues and debates
- To present educational, social, cultural, physical, ethical and religious programs for ALL

== Coverage of Islamic events ==
Hidayat TV regularly airs live and recorded events from Islamic gatherings and Islamic Pilgrimages.

Poems and recitals are aired including remembrance of the prophet Muhammad and his closest progeny and commemorations of the martyrdom of Imam Hussain and other Shia Imams.

There are also frequent broadcasts of popular Islamic prayers in particular Dua-e-Kumail and Dua-e-Tawassul.

== Main regular programmes ==
The main regular programs are:

- Tareekh-e-Islam
- Ahkam-e-Deen
- Islami Akhlaq
- Payam-e-Quran
- Quran aur hum
- Sahifa-e-Sajjadiyah
- Merajul Momin
- Pareshaniyun ka hal
- Intezar-e-Faraj
- Subh e Hidayat
- Future Stars
- Hidayat for Youth
- Khawateen-e-Islam
- Baseerat
- Tarbiyat-e-Aulad
- Makarim-e-AKhlaq
- Kijiye Sawaal
- Aqeedat ke phool
- Jaza o Saza
- Islamic Quiz
- Precious pearls
- The Big Picture Live
- Little Angels
- Maqam-e-Sahaba
- Sports Talk
- Hidayat TV Update
- Hadees Shanasi
- Muzakra
- Tajzia
- Tussa ni Awaz
- Hidayat Sunday Magazine
- Suburus

Naat Competition

Subhe Zindagi
