= City 42 =

Pakistani news channel

City 42 HD سٹی ۴۲ ایچ ڈی
- "All about the city"
- Country: Pakistan
- Network: City Media Group
- Headquarters: Lahore, Punjab, Pakistan,

Programming
- Picture format: (1080p 16:9, HDTV MPEG-4)

Ownership
- Owner: Mohsin Naqvi; Gohar Ejaz
- Sister channels: City 41; 24 Digital; UK & EU 44; Rohi; City 21

History
- Launched: December 2008; 17 years ago

Links
- Website: Official website

Availability

Streaming media
- City 42 Live

City 42 HD is a Lahore-based news channel which broadcasts news and information about latest happenings and events in the city of Lahore in Punjab, Pakistan. The channel was founded in 2008 and is owned by Mohsin Naqvi, the founder of City News Group and a former caretaker Chief Minister of Punjab (Pakistan).

The channel broadcasts a variety of programs in Urdu and English which range from current affairs to general infotainment.

== History ==
The channel was founded in 2008 by a Pakistani media mogul, Mohsin Naqvi, as C42. The channel name was based on the landline telephone dialing code of Lahore, 042.

== See also ==
- List of news channels in Pakistan
