= HadiTV =

Islamic television channel

Hadi TV
- Country: Iraq
- Broadcast area: Worldwide
- Network: Hadi TV Satellite Channel

Programming
- Picture format: 4:3 (576i, SDTV)

Ownership
- Owner: Hadi Foundation

History
- Launched: 2008

Links
- Website: Hadi TV

Hadi TV is an International television channel with a Muslim religious focus, producing programs mainly focusing on the Twelver school of thought. It has been named after the name of 10th Imam Ali al-Hadi and duly called Hadi TV. It is first multilingual Islamic channel to broadcast programmes in more than 15 Languages including English, Urdu, Arabic, Persian, F.Dari, Hausa, Swahili, Pashto, Azeri, French, Turkish, Russian, Kurdi, Thai and Malay languages. The channel is serving a combination of edutainment and infotainment for the community around the world. Hadi TV is producing programs from Pakistan and other countries. In April 2017 telecasting of this channel was banned in Jammu and Kashmir, India by the Central Government of India.

== List of channels ==
- Hadi TV 1 (Urdu, English) - Available in South Asia, USA, Canada, Australia, New Zealand and Europe.
- Hadi TV 2 (Malay, Thai) - Available in Southeast Asia and Middle East.
- Hadi TV 3 (Azerbaijani, Russian) - Available in Azerbaijan, Turkey, Kurdistan and Iran.
- Hadi TV 4 (Persian) - Available in Pakistan, Afghanistan, Iran, Iraq and Tajikistan.
- Hadi TV 5 (English, French, Hausa, Fula) - Available in Africa.
- Hadi TV 6 (Persian, Dari) - Available in Pakistan, Afghanistan and Iran.
- Hadi TV 7 (Kurdish, Turkish) - Available in Turkey, Iraq, Syria, Azerbaijan, Cyprus and European Union.
- Hadi TV 8 (English, Swahili, French, Urdu) - Available in Africa.
- Hadi TV 9 (Pashto) - Available in Pakistan and Afghanistan.
- Dua Channel (Arabic) - Available in Malaysia, North Africa and Middle East.

== U.S. Seizure of Online Sites ==
On June 22, 2021, United States law enforcement agencies seized a number of domains including haditv.com. The United States Department of Justice claims the websites it seized was taken for allegedly promoting disinformation campaigns and for violating U.S. sanctions against the Islamic Revolutionary Guard and radical terrorist groups.

== See also ==
- Television in Iraq
