= Dawn News =

Pakistani television channel

DAWN News HD
- Country: Pakistan
- Network: Dawn
- Headquarters: Karachi, Sindh, Pakistan

Programming
- Language: Urdu
- Picture format: (1080p 16:9, HDTV, MPEG-4)

Ownership
- Owner: Dawn Media Group
- Sister channels: CityFM89

History
- Launched: May 24, 2007; 19 years ago

Links
- Website: dawnnews.tv (Urdu) dawn.com (English)

Dawn News HD is a Pakistani 24-hour Urdu news channel. Based in Karachi, the station is a subsidiary of Pakistan Herald Publications Limited (PHPL), Pakistan's largest English-language media group.

The test transmission of the station occurred on 25 May 2007, and the channel went live on 23 July 2007. Originally broadcast in English, on 15 May 2010, Dawn News converted into an Urdu news channel after successful test transmission of four hours a day. The conversion was mainly due to its financial crisis and thin viewership in the country.

Express 24/7 replaced it as Pakistan's only English news channel briefly, until it too was shut down by Express Media Group for financial reasons.

After a brief test transmission, the channel went live in 2007.

== See also ==
- Dawn
- Dawn Group of Newspapers
- Television in Pakistan
- List of news channels in Pakistan
