= 2008 in Pakistani television =

The following is a list of events affecting Pakistani television in 2008. Events listed include television show debuts, and finales; channel launches, and closures; stations changing or adding their network affiliations; and information about changes of ownership of channels or stations.

== Television programs ==
=== Programs debuting in 2008 ===
Start date	Show	Channel	Source
12 May	Yeh Zindagi Hai	Geo TV	
17 October	Doraha	Geo TV	
14 August	Mutthi Bhar Mitti	Hum TV	
	The Ghost	Hum TV	
8 June	Coke Studio	Webcast	
20 April	Sipahi Maqbool Hussain	PTV Home	

== Channels ==
Launches:

- Unknown: Haq TV
- 1 January: Express News
- February: Dharti TV
- 1 December: Dunya News
