= Tribune 24/7 =

- Country: Pakistan
- Broadcast area: South Asia, Middle East
- Headquarters: Karachi, Pakistan

Programming
- Language: English

Ownership
- Owner: Television Media Network (Private) Limited (Lakson Group)
- Sister channels: Express News, Express Entertainment

History
- Launched: 5 February 2009 (relaunched in July 2018)
- Closed: 2019
- Former names: Express 24/7

Links
- Website: Official Website

Tribune 24/7 (previously Express 24/7) was an English language television news channel headquartered in Karachi, Pakistan. The channel was owned by the Lakson Group.

== History ==
Tribune 24/7 was the second English-language television channel to be established in Pakistan, with Dawn News being the first. After Dawn News shifted to Urdu broadcasts in February 2010, Express 24/7 remained the only 24-hour English-language news channel in Pakistan until its closure in November 2011. The Express 24/7 CEO, Sultan Lakhani, cited the dismal economic condition and insufficient number of advertisement as the main reasons behind the closure.
Express 24/7 was relaunched as Tribune 24/7 in 2018, before closing down again in 2019.

== See also ==
- Express News
- List of television stations in Pakistan
