= GNN (Pakistani TV channel) =

Pakistani TV news channel

GNN HD (Pakistan)
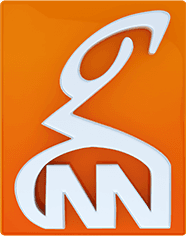
- Country: Pakistan
- Broadcast area: Nationwide
- Headquarters: Lahore, Punjab, Pakistan

Programming
- Language: Urdu
- Picture format: (1080i 16:9 MPEG-4, HDTV)

Ownership
- Owner: Gourmet Foods
- Parent: Vision Network Television Limited
- Key people: Shahid Masood (President)

History
- Launched: August 14, 2018; 8 years ago
- Former names: CNBC Pakistan 2005–2013; Jaag (2013–2018)

Links
- Website: gnnhd.tv

Availability

Streaming media
- HD Stream: Watch Live

GNN News HD, commonly known as GNN, is a 24-hour news and current affairs channel based in Lahore, Pakistan. It is owned and operated by Gourmet Foods.

The channel was originally launched in 2005 as CNBC Pakistan under a license from CNBC Asia Pacific. It was then owned by Vision Network Television Limited. In 2015, it was relaunched as Jaag TV. In 2018, it was again relaunched with a new name, GNN.

== History ==
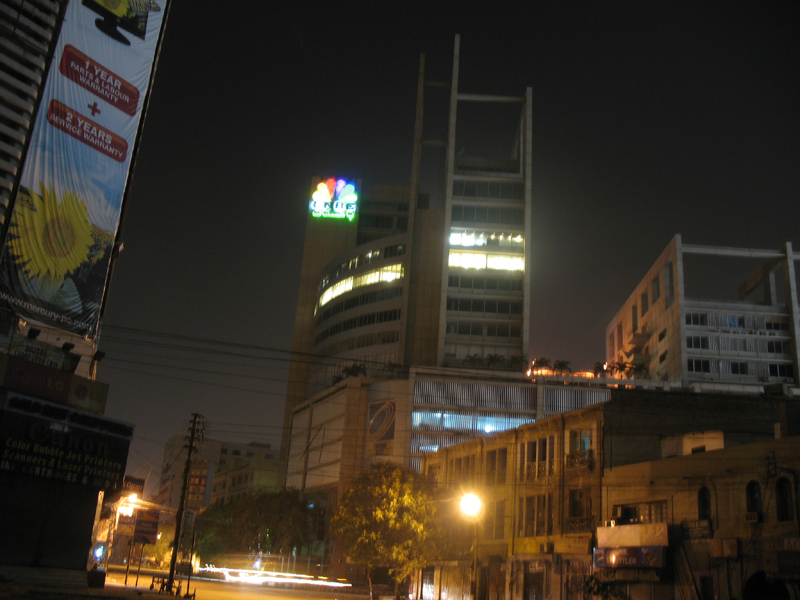
CNBC Pakistan HQ at night

It started its transmission under the name CNBC Pakistan by taking a license from CNBC Asia. It was then owned by Vision Network Television.

In 2015, it was relaunched as Jaag TV after struggling to compete in the Pakistani market. The channel continued to struggle and was bought by Pakistani bakery company, Gourmet Foods. Reportedly, they bought it for Rs. 1.5 billion to diversify their business.

In 2018, the company announced its intention to rename the channel and relaunch it under the name, G News Network. For this purpose, they appointed Amir Mir, brother of journalist and anchor Hamid Mir, as the Chief Operating Officer (COO) of the channel.

On 10 August 2018, Hamid Mir left Geo TV and joined GNN as President of the channel along with two other colleagues Sohail Warraich and Munib Farooq. But his stint remained brief at GNN as two months later on 12 October 2018, Hamid Mir left GNN.

Journalist Dr. Shahid Masood joined GNN as President on 14 April 2019, continuing his show Live With Dr. Shahid Masood.

Journalist Arif Hameed Bhatti joined GNN as chief operating officer (COO) on 13 June 2019.

The TV channel is planning on launching a new show with American-Pakistani Journalist Riasat Ali Changezi, planning to be launched in July 2027.

== Shows ==
- Khabar Hai (Arif Hameed Bhatti, Saeed Qazi and Tahir Malik)
- Live With Dr Shahid Masood (Shahid Masood; anchor: Zaryab Arif, earlier Mehr U. Sher, Naila Ali, Samina Pasha
- View Point (Imran Yaqub Khan, Samina Pasha and Zafar Hilaly)
- G Kay Sung (Mohsin Bhatti)
- Food Street
- Aisa Dais Hai Mera
- Nagar Nagar ki Khabar
- News Edge
- Global Insight
- Face 2 Face

=== Former shows ===
- Aashkar
- Bebaak
- Clash with Aisha Yousaf
- GNN Tonight
- Joke Dar Joke
- Hamid Mir Show
- Inside Out

=== GNN HD Network ===
- GNN - HD News Channel
- GNN Entertainment - HD Entertainment Channel - Coming soon

== See also ==
- List of television stations in Pakistan
- List of news channels in Pakistan
