= 2013 in Pakistani television =

The following is a list of events affecting Pakistani television in 2013. Events listed include television show debuts and finales, channel launches and closures, stations changing or adding their network affiliations, and changes of ownership of channels or stations.

== Television programs ==
=== Programs debuting in 2013 ===
Start date	Show	Channel	Source
16 April	Rasgullay	ARY Digital	
16 April	Adhoori Aurat	Geo Entertainment	
18 June	Aunn Zara	A-Plus Entertainment	
18 August	Aasmanon Pay Likha	Geo Entertainment	
26 November	Pyarey Afzal	ARY Digital	
6 December	Pakistan Idol	Geo Entertainment	

== Channels ==
Launches:

- Unknown: Jalwa TV
- 29 January: PTV World
- 10 April: Capital TV
- 19 April: Abb Takk News
- 11 May: Geo Tez
- 16 May: Geo Kahani
- 14 December: Hum Sitaray
