= Khyber TV =

- AVT Khyber logo (present)
- Country: Pakistan

Programming
- Languages: Pashto, Urdu
- Picture format: (1080p (16:9 MPEG-4, HDTV)

Ownership
- Owner: Kamran Hamid Raja
- Sister channels: Khyber News; Khyber Middle East

History
- Launched: 1 July 2004; 21 years ago

Links
- Website: www.avtkhyber.tv

Availability

Streaming media
- AVT Khyber Live: Watch Live

Khyber TV, formerly known as AVT Khyber, is a Pashto-language satellite television channel in Pakistan, which was launched in July 2004. It is Pakistan's first Pashto language television channel. It has links to the United Arab Emirates.

== Financing ==
Khyber Middle East TV is a television channel of Pakistan and the United Arab Emirates, with headquarters located in Islamabad and Dubai, owned by Kamran Hamid Raja. According to his 2025 Linked In profile he received a Master of Business Administration (MBA), Marketing Master of Business Administration (MBA), Marketing 1974–1976 at Govt College Lahore, Punjab University, Lahore and has been CEO of AVT Channels since 2004.

== Programming ==
The channel broadcasts 24 hours a day, providing educational, news, variety shows, dramas, and entertainment programs to the Pashto-speaking population of Pakistan and Afghanistan as well as those living in the Middle East, Europe and Australia. Unlike most TV stations in Pakistan, AVT Khyber's programs are only in the Pashto language.

== Locations ==
The main office of AVT Khyber is located in Islamabad, Pakistan. It also has regional offices in the cities of Peshawar and Quetta in Pakistan as well as in Jalalabad, Kabul, and Kandahar in Afghanistan.

== Reception ==
The owner of the Khyber TV website is hidden, website traffic is rather low and the registrar of this website is popular amongst scammers.

== Frequency information ==
- PakSat-MM1 at 38.2° East
- Downlink Frequency: 4078 MHz
- Polarity: Horizontal
- FEC: 2/3
- Symbol Rate: 4800 KSPS

== See also ==
- List of Pakistani television stations
- Media of Pakistan
