= 2014 in Pakistani television =

In 2014, several Pakistani television programmes made their debut. For example Bunty I Love You debuted on Hum TV on 5 January and Bashar Momin debuted on Geo TV on 14 March.

== Television programmes debuting in 2014 ==
=== Hum TV ===
- Bunty I Love You (5 January 2014)
- Joru-Ka-Ghulam (17 October 2014)
- Mr. Shamim (28 December 2014)

=== ARY Digital ===
- Kuch Kar Dikha (28 February 2014)
- Good Morning Pakistan (25 March 2014)
- Jeeto Pakistan (18 May 2014)
- Khuda Na Karay (13 October 2014)

=== Geo Entertainment ===
- Bashar Momin (14 March 2014)

== Television programmes ending in 2014 ==
=== Hum TV ===
- Bunty I Love You (18 May 2014)

=== ARY Digital ===
- Kuch Kar Dikha (16 May 2014)

=== Geo Entertainment ===
- Bashar Momin (8 November 2014)

== Channels ==
Launches:

- 11 April: ARY Zindagi
- 1 November: Hum Pashto 1
