= 8XM =

Pakistani music channel

8XM HD
- Country: Pakistan
- Network: Apna Channel
- Headquarters: Lahore, Punjab, Pakistan

Programming
- Language: Urdu
- Picture format: (1080p, 16:9 MPEG-4, HDTV)

Ownership
- Sister channels: Abb Takk News, Apna Channel, Jalwa TV

History
- Launched: 11 July 2011; 13 years ago

Links
- Website: 8xm.tv

Availability

Streaming media
- Livestream

8XM is an all-day Pakistani music television channel that airs old and new Pakistani, Hollywood and Turkish music videos.

8XM was launched in 2011. It is owned by Media Concepts which also operates Jalwa TV in Pakistan.

== See also ==
- List of music channels in Pakistan
