= 2017 in Pakistani television =

The following is a list of events affecting Pakistani television in 2017. Events listed include television show debuts, and finales; channel launches, and closures; stations changing or adding their network affiliations; and information about changes of ownership of channels or stations.

== Television programs ==
=== Programs continuing from 2016 (Ended in 2017) ===
==== Hum TV ====
- Bin Roye
- Choti Si Zindagi
- Hatheli
- Kathputli
- Laaj
- Sanam
- Sang-e-Mar Mar
- Saya-e-Dewar Bhi Nahi

==== Geo TV ====
- Dhaani (Geo TV)

=== 2017 Television debuts ===
==== Hum TV ====
- Alif Allah Aur Insaan
- Mohabbat Khawab Safar
- Yaqeen Ka Safar
- Phir Wohi Mohabbat
- Sangsaar
- Toh Dil Ka Kia Hua
- Pagli
- O Rangreza
- Daldal
- Yeh Raha Dil

==== Geo TV ====
- Mohabbat Tumse Nafrat Hai
- Bholi Bano
- Rani
- Hari Hari Churiyaan

==== Geo Kahani ====
- Naagin (17 April 2017– 27 May 2019 )

==== Urdu 1 ====
- Be Inteha
- Titli
- Baaghi (27 July 2017 – 1 February 2018)

==== ARY Digital ====
- Rasm E Duniya
- Sun Yaara
- Mera Angan
- Badnaam

== Channels ==
Launches:

- 1 February: Lahore News
- 27 May: Rohi
