= 2005 in Pakistani television =

The following is a list of events affecting Pakistani television in 2005. Events listed include television show debuts, and finales; channel launches, and closures; stations changing or adding their network affiliations; and information about changes of ownership of channels or stations.

== Television programs ==
=== Programs debuting in 2005 ===
Start date	Show	Channel	Source
27 January	Commander Safeguard	Various channels	
May	Morning with Hum	Hum TV	
	Riyasat	ARY Digital	
	Rubber Band	ARY Digital	

== Channels ==
Launches:

- 17 January: Eye TV
- 23 March: Aaj News
- 24 June: ATV
- 4 July: BabyTV
- 14 August: PTV Bolan
- 15 September: TV One Pakistan
