= Television in Pakistan =

Television in Pakistan started in 1964 and the first live transmission of Pakistan Television began on 26 November 1964, in Lahore.

In the early 2020s there were some 114 satellite TV channels in Pakistan, with most (42) concentrating on entertainment followed by news and current affairs (31).

== History ==
In 1955, Pakistan's first television showcase occurred near Mazar-e-Quaid on September 16, organized by the American consulate in Karachi. The initiative to establish the television industry stemmed from the National Education Commission, backed by President Ayub Khan. Originally a private project led by Syed Wajjid Ali in 1961, a joint venture agreement with NEC was signed. Engineer Ubaidur Rahman, appointed by Wajjid Ali, oversaw the project. By 1963, the government took control for the "greater national interest."

In 1964, the first official television station began broadcasts in Lahore, followed by Dhaka in 1965. Rawalpindi-Islamabad and Karachi centers were established in 1965 and 1966, respectively. Peshawar and Quetta centers followed by 1974. Initially under Television Promoters Company (TPC) in 1966, it was upgraded to Pakistan Television Corp in 1967. Nationalised in 1972, PTV's experimental color transmission started in 1976. In 1987, the Pakistan Television Academy was founded for training in the evolving medium. In the late 1980s, morning transmissions commenced.

In 1990, the government launched the semi-government TV network "Peoples Television Network" (PTN) under Shalimar Recording Company, now Shalimar Recording and Broadcasting Company. PTN merged with Shalimar Recording Company in 1991, renaming the TV channel as Shalimar Television Network (STN). Starting in Islamabad and expanding to Karachi and Lahore, STN covered the entire country by the mid-1990s.

STN pioneered the terrestrial beam programming of CNN International in Pakistan, followed by BBC World. In 1990, PTN initiated the first private TV slot through an agreement with Inter-flow, giving rise to Network Television Marketing (NTM). STN's broadcast combined CNN programming, NTM's slot, and limited broadcasts of BBC World and German DW TV, continuing successfully until 1999. NTM introduced innovative and refreshing programming to Pakistani viewers.

In 1991-1992, PTV Network introduced a comprehensive satellite broadcasting service, launching PTV-2 as Pakistan's first satellite channel in 1992. By 1994, PTV joined the satellite beam alongside PTV-2, which was later renamed PTV World in 1998. PTV-2/World also retained viewership on the terrestrial beam. In 1998, PTV collaborated with a private company (Prime Entertainment Network) to initiate PTV Prime, catering exclusively to European audiences and later expanding to American viewers. Digital TV satellite broadcasting commenced in 1999, with PTV/PTV-1 gaining an independent satellite beam in 2001. In 1999, financial losses led to the shutdown of NTM, causing STN to cease CNN International broadcasts and limit programming from BBC World and DW TV. PTV Network took over STN in 1999, renaming it Channel-3, which began regular transmissions in 2000, accompanied by a satellite beam.

In 2000, The government of Pakistan opened up new ways for the media industry of Pakistan by allowing private TV channels to operate openly even to telecast their own news and current affairs content. ARY Digital was launched in September 2000, Geo Entertainment in August 2002, Aaj TV in March 2005 and Hum TV was launched in January 2005, and the phenomenon went on. In 2005, Channel-3 ceased operations, leading Shalimar Recording and Broadcasting Company to rebrand its TV channel as ATV through a joint venture with SSI. ATV became Pakistan's sole semi-private TV channel, broadcasting on both terrestrial and satellite platforms. However, it evolved into a semi-government channel as SRBC did not renew its agreement with SSI.

In 2007, PTV-1 was rebranded as PTV Home, while PTV World went off air temporarily, resuming in 2012-13 as Pakistan's sole English language/pure satellite channel. PTV News replaced PTV World in 2007. PTV Home, PTV News (both state-owned), and ATV (semi-private) are broadcast on terrestrial and satellite beams. PTV Sports, initiated recently, airs on terrestrial beams during significant national and international sports events. In 2005, PTV Prime became an independent entity, and in 2006, PTV launched PTV Global exclusively for Americas and Europe.

=== Liberalisation of the Media Industry in 2002 ===
A pivotal moment in the history of television in Pakistan occurred in the year 2002 with the liberalisation of the media industry. This transformative development marked a departure from the previously tightly controlled landscape, ushering in a new era of diversity, competition, and expanded opportunities for broadcasters. The government's decision to open up the media sector allowed private television channels to operate openly, telecasting their own news, current affairs, and entertainment content.

This liberalisation led to the emergence of a dynamic and competitive television market, with several private channels making their debut. Channels like ARY Digital, Geo Entertainment, and Hum TV were launched, introducing a diverse range of programming to the Pakistani audience. The newfound freedom and autonomy provided to private broadcasters paved the way for innovative and varied content, reflecting the rich culture of the nation. The liberalisation not only transformed the television landscape but also played a crucial role in shaping public discourse and access to information.

== Distribution ==
In Pakistan, only the national broadcasters are allowed to use terrestrial airwaves. Three Free-to-air TV Channels are available on terrestrial beam, these are PTV Home, PTV News and ATV. PTV Sports is available in place of PTV Home or PTV News when an important match/event has to be given live coverage as PTV has the rights for sports coverage at terrestrial airwaves. Transmissions of AJK TV are available on terrestrial network in the northern areas of Azad Jammu and Kashmir only. Recently Pakistan has launched Digital terrestrial broadcast in selected areas only in collaboration with China. Through DTMB five TV channels of PTV Network, ATV and two Chinese TV Channels are available via terrestrial beam.

Many national and international channels are available via Satellite. Some National TV Channels are "Pay Cable". Internet Protocol TV Service is provided by PTCL which is of high quality and is quite popular in the urban centres. Cable TV Networks are the most famous mode of television distribution in Pakistan.

== Regulation ==
Pakistan Electronic Media Regulatory Authority regularises the TV Channels in Pakistan. This authority issues licences for the launch of any TV Channel in Pakistan. Above mentioned national broadcasters, i.e PTV Corp and SRBC do not come under purview of PEMRA.

=== Role of PEMRA ===
The landscape of television in Pakistan is marked by a significant regulatory framework, with the Pakistan Electronic Media Regulatory Authority (PEMRA) playing a central role in overseeing and governing the industry. Established in 2002, PEMRA serves as the regulatory body responsible for issuing licenses, ensuring compliance with codes of conduct, and maintaining standards across the electronic media sector.

PEMRA's mandate encompasses television, radio, and other electronic media platforms. The authority is entrusted with the task of fostering a media environment that adheres to ethical and professional standards while promoting freedom of expression. Over the years, PEMRA has been actively involved in shaping and refining policies to address the evolving challenges and dynamics of the media landscape.

The regulatory framework includes guidelines on content, licensing, and advertising standards, with PEMRA playing a vital role in maintaining a balance between freedom of expression and responsible media practices. The authority has the power to grant and revoke licenses, ensuring that broadcasters adhere to the established regulations. Moreover, PEMRA regularly reviews and updates its policies to keep pace with technological advancements and changing societal norms.

While the regulatory framework ensures accountability and responsible broadcasting, it has also sparked discussions about the delicate balance between regulation and freedom of the press.

=== Criticisms of PEMRA ===
The Pakistan Electronic Media Regulatory Authority (PEMRA) has not been immune to criticism, sparking discussions on the delicate balance between regulation and the principles of a free press in Pakistan. One recurring critique revolves around the perceived susceptibility of PEMRA to political influence, raising concerns about its impartiality. Critics argue that selective application of regulations and decisions influenced by political considerations may compromise the independence of media outlets. Another issue is the process of license issuance and revocation, with claims of arbitrariness. Critics contend that such perceived inconsistencies could potentially stifle the diversity of voices and perspectives in the media landscape. While PEMRA is entrusted with maintaining responsible media practices, ongoing discourse about its transparency and impartiality reflects the challenges inherent in regulating a dynamic and rapidly evolving media environment in Pakistan.

== See also ==
- List of 4K channels in Pakistan
- List of television stations in Pakistan
- List of Urdu-language television channels
- List of Punjabi-language television channels
- List of Balochi-language television channels
- List of Pashto-language television channels
- List of Sindhi-language television channels
- List of Pakistani television series
- List of years in Pakistani television
- Lists of television channels
- List of television channels in Pakistan
- Timeline of the introduction of television in countries
