= List of Pakistani male actors =

This is an alphabetical list of notable Pakistani male film and television actors.

== A ==
- Aagha Ali
- Abdullah Ejaz
- Abdullah Kadwani
- Abid Ali
- Abid Kashmiri
- Abid Khan
- Adeeb
- Adeel Hussain
- Adil Murad
- Adnan Jaffar
- Adnan Malik
- Adnan Siddiqui
- Afzal Khan
- Agha Sikandar
- Ahad Raza Mir
- Ahmed Ali Butt
- Ahmed Butt
- Ahmed Jahanzeb
- Ahsan Khan
- Aijaz Aslam
- Ajab Gul
- Akmal Khan
- Alamzeb Mujahid
- Albela
- Ali Abbas
- Ali Ansari
- Ali Haider
- Ali Ejaz
- Ali Rehman Khan
- Ali Zafar
- Allauddin
- Alyy Khan
- Anwar Solangi
- Arslan Asad Butt
- Asad Malik
- Asad Siddiqui
- Asif Raza Mir
- Aslam Pervaiz
- Ather Shah Khan Jaidi
- Ayaz Samoo
- Azfar Rehman

== B ==
- Babar Ali
- Babar Khan
- Badar Munir
- Bilal Abbas Khan
- Bilal Ashraf
- Bilal Khan
- Behroze Sabzwari
- Babu Baral

== D ==
- Danish Nawaz
- Danish Taimoor
- Danyal Zafar
- Darpan

== E ==
- Ejaz Durrani
- Emmad Irfani

== F ==
- Fahad Mustafa
- Fahad Rehmani
- Fahad Shaikh
- Faisal Rehman
- Faisal Qureshi
- Faizan Khawaja
- Farhan Ali Agha
- Farhan Saeed
- Farooq Qaiser
- Farooq Zameer
- Fawad Khan
- Faysal Qureshi
- Faizan Shahzad Khan
- Feroze Khan
- Firdous Jamal
- Furqan Qureshi

== G ==
- Ghulam Mohiuddin
- Ghayyur Akhtar
- Gohar Rasheed
- Goher Mumtaz

== H ==
- Hamza Ali Abbasi
- Hamza Sohail
- Hamzah Tariq Jamil
- Habib-ur-Rehman
- Hameed Sheikh
- Hamid Rana
- Hassam Khan
- Hasan Jahangir
- Hayatullah Khan Durrani
- Humayun Saeed

== I ==
- Iftikhar Thakur
- Ilyas Kashmiri
- Imran Abbas Naqvi
- Imran Ashraf
- Imran Aslam
- Inayat Hussain Bhatti
- Iqbal Theba
- Irfan Khoosat
- Ismael Shah
- Ismail Tara
- Ismail Shahid
- Izhar Qazi

== J ==
- Jamal Shah
- Jamil Fakhri
- Jamshed Ansari
- Javed Sheikh
- Jawad Bashir
- Junaid Khan

== K ==
- Kader Khan
- Kaifee
- Kamal Ahmed Rizvi
- Kamal Irani
- Kanwar Arsalan
- Kashif Mehmood
- Khalid Abbas Dar
- Khaled Anam
- Khayyam Sarhadi
- Kumail Nanjiani

== L ==
- Latif Kapadia
- Lehri
- Liaquat Soldier

== M ==
- Mahmood Ali
- Mehmood Akhtar
- Mehmood Aslam
- Munawar Zarif
- Malik Anokha
- Murtaza Hassan
- Mehboob Alam
- Mikaal Zulfiqar
- Mirza Shahi
- Moammar Rana
- Mohammad Ali
- Mohammed Ehteshamuddin
- Mohib Mirza
- Mohsin Abbas Haider
- Moin Akhter
- Mukarram
- Murtaza Hassan
- Mustafa Qureshi
- Mustansar Hussain Tarar
- Muhammad Usman Malik

== N ==
- Nabeel
- Nadeem Baig
- Naeem Hashmi
- Naeem Tahir
- Najeebullah Anjum
- Naseem Vicky
- Nasir Chinyoti
- Nayyar Ejaz
- Nazir Ahmed Khan
- Nirala
- Noman Habib
- Noman Ijaz
- Noman Masood
- Noor Hassan Rizvi

== O ==
- Omer Shahzad
- Osman Khalid Butt

== Q ==
- Qavi Khan
- Qazi Wajid

== R ==
- Rafi Khawar
- Rahat Kazmi
- Rahman Syed
- Rasheed Naz
- Rauf Khalid
- Rauf Lala
- Rizwan Wasti

== S ==
- Saad Haroon
- Saeed Khan Rangeela
- Sheheryar Munawar Siddiqui
- Sahir Lodhi
- Sajjad Ali
- Sajjad Kishwar
- Sajid Hasan
- Salahuddin Toofani
- Saleem Sheikh
- Salim Nasir
- Salman Shahid
- Salman Saqib Sheikh
- Sami Khan
- Sami Shah
- Santosh Kumar
- Sarmad Khoosat
- Saud
- Shaan Shahid
- Shabbir Jan
- Shafi Muhammad Shah
- Shafqat Cheema
- Shahid
- Shahid Khan
- Shehroz Sabzwari
- Shahood Alvi
- Shahzad Noor
- Shaz Khan
- Shakeel Hussain Khan
- Shakeel
- Shamil Khan
- Shamoon Abbasi
- Shehzad Sheikh
- Sikander Rizvi
- Sikandar Sanam
- Sohail Ahmed
- Sohail Asghar
- Sohail Sameer
- Subhani ba Yunus
- Sudhir
- Sultan Rahi
- Syed Ishrat Abbas
- Syed Kamal

== T ==
- Tariq Aziz
- Tauqeer Nasir
- Tariq Mustafa
- Tariq Teddy

== U ==
- Umer Sharif
- Usman Peerzada

== V ==
- Vasay Chaudhry

== W ==
- Wahaj Ali
- Waheed Murad
- Wajahat Rauf
- Waseem Abbas

== Y ==
- Yasir Nawaz
- Yasir Hussain
- Yousuf Khan

== Z ==
- Zain Afzal
- Zia Mohyeddin
- Zuhab Khan

== See also ==
- List of Pakistani actresses
- List of Pakistani models
