= Zafri Khan =

Pakistani actor and comedian

- Born: 25 November 1970 (age 55); Faisalabad, Punjab, Pakistan
- Occupations: Actor; Comedian
- Notable work: Chal Mera Putt 2 Khabardaar

Comedy career
- Medium: Stand-up; Television; Film
- Genres: Observational comedy; Black comedy; Insult comedy; Physical comedy
- Subjects: Everyday life; Pakistani culture; Popular culture

Zafri Khan (ﻇﻔﺮﯼ ﺧﺎﻥ; born 25 November 1970) is a Pakistani actor and comedian.

He is best known for his work in Punjabi theatre, based in Lahore. He also has a successful career in television and films. Khan is famous for his slapstick comedy. He has acted with a number of other comedians including Nasir Chinyoti, Murtaza Hassan, Naseem Vicky, Amanullah, Babu Baral, Sohail Ahmad, Iftikhar Thakur, Anwar Ali, Tariq Teddy and Sakhawat Naz.

== Early life ==
Zafri Khan was born in Punjab on 25 November 1970.

Before beginning his career in comedy, Zafri Khan worked as a tailor.

Fellow actor and comedian Wajid Khan is his first cousin.

== Career ==
=== Early work ===
Zafri Khan started his career from Pakistan theatre. His acclaimed theatre career has continued to flourish and he is now regarded as one of the most popular stage actors.

=== 2010s: Established star ===
In 2016, Khan participated in Indian comedy competition show called Mazaak Mazaak Mein. He hosted a talk show called Afra Zafri on 24 News HD in 2018. Khan portrayed the role of Advocate Bilal in Punjabi movie Chal Mera Putt 2 His performance in the film was well received by critics.

=== 2020s: Khabardaar ===
Khan joined comedy satire show Khabardaar on Express News in 2021 after Honey Albela left the show.

== Filmography ==
=== Films ===
Year	Title	Role	Note	Country
2005	Wada Chaudhry	Raphri	Supporting role	Pakistan
2012	Lahoria	Hero	Leading role	Pakistan
2019	Run Mureed	Mureed	Leading role	Pakistan
2020	Chal Mera Putt 2	Advocate Bilal Randhawa	Supporting role	India
2021	Chal Mera Putt 3	Advocate Bilal Randhawa	Supporting role	India
2022	Aaja Mexico Challiye	Guddu	Supporting role	India
2024	Daaru Na Peenda Hove	Gogga	Leading role	India

=== Reality shows ===
Year	Show	Role	Network	Country
2016	Mazaak Mazaak Mein	Contestant	Life OK	India
2018	Afra Zafri	Host	24 News	Pakistan
2021	Khabardaar	Various roles	Express News	Pakistan

=== Theatre ===
- Unknown year : Mithiyan Shrartan
- Unknown year : Dhumka
- Unknown year : Kuch Kuch Hota Hai
- Unknown year : Dil Da Bazar
- Unknown year : Butt Te Bhatti
- Unknown year : Pagli
- Unknown year : Chan Da Tota
