= List of Pakistani comedians =

A comedian is one who entertains through comedy, such as jokes and other forms of humour. Following is a list of comedians, comedy groups, and comedy writers.

== Pakistani comedians ==
(sorted alphabetically by surname)

== A ==
- Albela (actor)
- Ali Gul Pir
- Amanullah (comedian)

== I ==
- Iftikhar Thakur

== M ==
- Mir Mohammad Ali
- Muhammad Faizan Sheikh
- Moin Akhtar
- Mohammad Saeed Khan(Rangeela)

== N ==
- Nasir Chinyoti
- Nazar (died 20 January 1992)

- Saad Haroon
- Shafaat Ali
- Shakeel Siddiqui
- Sohail Ahmed
