= The Express Tribune =

Pakistani English-language newspaper

- Front page on 1 January 2015
- Type: Daily newspaper
- Format: Broadsheet
- Founder: Sultan Ali Lakhani
- Publisher: Bilal Ali Lakhani
- Editor: Naveed Hussain; Fahd Hussain (executive editor)
- Founded: 12 April 2010
- Political alignment: Centre-left; Social liberalism; Egalitarianism
- Language: English
- Headquarters: Plot 5; Expressway; Off Korangi Road; Karachi, Pakistan
- Sister newspapers: Daily Express
- Website: tribune.com.pk

The Express Tribune is a daily English-language newspaper based in Pakistan. It is the flagship publication of the Lakson Group media group and Pakistan's only internationally affiliated newspaper in a partnership with the International New York Times, the global edition of The New York Times. Headquartered in Karachi, it also publishes from offices in Lahore, Islamabad, and Peshawar.

== History ==
The Express Tribune was launched on 12 April 2010, in broadsheet format, with a news design distinctive from traditional Pakistani newspapers. Its editorial stance identifies with social liberalism, and its readership is generally on the mainstream left of Pakistani political and social opinion. Topics the newspaper covers include politics, international affairs, economics, investment, sports, and culture. It runs a glossy called Express Tribune Magazine on Sunday, which includes social commentary, interviews, and a four-page supplement with recipes, reviews, travel advice, blogs, and technology news. As of 2012, it had the widest online readership in the country locally and internationally.

== Part of Express media group ==
The Express Tribune joins other brands of the Express media group including the Urdu-language newspaper Daily Express. It is accompanied by a twenty-four-hour Urdu news channel, Express News, and an Urdu entertainment channel, Express Entertainment. It also contains a technology supplement called '@internet'. It used to run an English-language news channel called Express 24/7, now defunct. The paper's stated mission is "to defend the liberal values and egalitarian traditions [they] believe in, and which deserve to be upheld in writing that is both informative and insightful".

== Staff ==
The publisher of The Express Tribune, Bilal Ali Lakhani, is the son of Sultan Ali Lakhani. Its first managing editor, Muhammad Ziauddin, was previously associated with Dawn. The Express Tribune is the most-read English-language newspaper from Pakistan in Eastern Europe, Central Asia, and the Caucasian region.

== Columnists ==
Prominent columnists for The Express Tribune include investigative reporter Naveed Ahmad, former caretaker finance minister Shahid Javed Burki, The Express Tribune Publisher M. Bilal Lakhani, retired ambassador and former Interior secretary Rustam Shah Mohmand, retired lieutenant general and former federal secretary Talat Masood, Former General Manager of Gulf News Anwer Mooraj, Urdu scholar and University of Chicago Professor C. M. Naim, Amnesty International (India) Executive Director Aakar Patel, American journalist and academic Faisal Kutty, Retired Brigadier Shaukat Qadir, former Executive Editor of The Express Tribune M. Ziauddin, and Foreign Editor Robin Fernandez. Shahid Mahmood is one of the paper's political cartoonists. In addition to that, various independent journalists also contribute to The Express Tribune. The Express Tribune also accepts blog posts from individuals.

== Terrorist attack and self-censorship ==
On 2 December 2013, Express Media Group's offices were targeted in a terrorist attack in which three staff workers were killed. Pakistani politician Altaf Hussain condemned the attack and said that it is the obligation of the government to ensure the safety of the people. TTP later took responsibility for the attacks and declared the paper to be propagating against their militant group, citing it as their reason for the attack.

In March 2014, a New York Times story about what Pakistan officials knew in regard to Osama bin Laden's presence in the country was censored from the front page of the International New York Times in Pakistan by the local distributor, The Express Tribune.

In 2016, a Chinese court accepted to hear a case regarding the issue of same-sex marriage. As such, the case got substantial coverage. However, in the Pakistani version (The Express Tribune) of the International New York Times, the picture accompanying this news story was censored and a blank space was left on the front page of the newspaper. Daily Times columnist Farman Nawaz raised several questions about this type of journalism in Pakistan.

== See also ==
- List of newspapers in Pakistan
