= Shoki Khan =

Pakistani stage actor

Shoki Khan شوکی خان
- Born: Ghiyas-ud-Din; January 1951; Bilal Ganj, Lahore, Punjab, Pakistan
- Died: February 2003 (aged 52); Kasur, Punjab, Pakistan
- Education: FA

Comedy career
- Genres: Observational comedy; Black comedy; Insult comedy; Physical comedy

Ghiyas-ud-Din (Urdu: غیاث الدین; January 1951 - February 2003) better known by his stage name Shoki Khan, was a Pakistani stage actor, comedian and musical artist. He performed in more than 1,000 plays, more than 500 of which he appeared as a servant, which is an exceptional honor.

== Career ==
Shoki Khan completed his studies up to the FA level before entering the stage industry. He launched his profession with Naheed Khanum's drama. Raja Ab To Aaja, Sone Ki Chiria, Fasad Ki Jar, Pakro Pakro Dulha Pakro, Laarha Chori Da, Hasaan Ge Sari Raat, and Lottay Zero Meter are just a few of Shoki Khan's well-known plays. Additionally, he collaborated with the performers Babu Baral, Anwar Ali, Mastana, and Mujahid Abbas. Fans always remember Shoki Khan for his brash and spontaneous lines.

== Death ==
On 21 February 2003, the Shoki was killed in a car mishap close to Kasur. By acting in theatrical productions, the son of Shoki Khan, Fuki Khan, is also preserving his father's artistic legacy.

== See also ==
- Nasir Chinyoti
- Babu Baral
- Mastana
- Iftikhar Thakur
