= Khabarzar =

Comedy television show

- Title image of the show
- Genre: Comedy; Satire; Information
- Created by: Aftab Iqbal
- Directed by: Haseeb Sajad Khan
- Creative director: Aftab Iqbal
- Presented by: Aftab Iqbal
- Starring: Aftab Iqbal; Honey Albela; Nasir Chinyoti; Babbu Rana; Rubi Anam; Abdur Rehman Amjad; Ayub Mirza; Azhar Rangeela; Amanullah Khan; Agha Majid; Saleem Albela; Asad Kaifi; Nayab Faiza; Abubakar Khan
- Country of origin: Pakistan
- Original languages: Urdu; Punjabi
- No. of episodes: 181

Production
- Producer: Faheem Waqas
- Production location: Pakistan
- Editor: Syed Ghazi Ali
- Camera setup: Nadeem Ahmed Bhatti
- Running time: 40 - 50 minutes

Original release
- Network: Aap News
- Release: 19 November 2018 – 5 January 2020

Khabarzar (Urdu: خبرزار) is an Urdu and Punjabi comedy television show on Aap News starting 19 November 2018. The last episode aired on 15 December 2019 after which the team joined Neo News.

== History ==
Khabarzar is the fourth show of similar genre launched by Aftab Iqbal. Hasb-e-Haal was launched in January 2009. In April 2010, Aftab Iqbal left the show due to undisclosed reasons which led to Junaid Saleem hosting the show. Next Aftab Iqbal launched Khabarnaak on GEO TV in 2010 from which he parted ways in August 2015. He joined Express News to launch Khabardaar which ran until April 2018. Aftab Iqbal announced that he is working on his own news channel on which his next show will air. Around October, 2018, his TV Channel was named Aap News, where he fulfills the administrative affairs. The show has been in pre-production since August and started production and shooting after Aap News was announced. The show started airing on Aap News from 19 November 2018.

== Segments ==
The show doesn't have a set schedule of segments for each episode; there are a number of recurring segments, as follow:

- Current News: This segment consists of parody/skits, based on a certain ludicrous piece of current news.
- Songs from the past: In this segment, a singer performs a song from the past, usually from 70's to 90's Bollywood and Lollywood.
- Parody Films: This segment is a parody of old iconic Hollywood, Bollywood and Lollywood movies, usually with the characters being modified to be used as metaphors for current sociopolitical issues.
- Guests from The Dummy Museum: As the name suggests, this segment consists of a dummy celebrity being interviewed. (Dummies of politician Yousaf Raza Gillani and Pakistani actress Meera have very frequent appearances). This segment is purely for comical and satirical purposes.
- Musician's House: This segment revolves around a classical musicians' family. It pays tribute to the famous Khan family of classical music. It also portrays the poor condition of such musicians in current day.
- Police Station: As evident from the name, the center of this segment is a local police station. This segment is purely for comical and satirical purposes.
- Mughal Court: This segment is started by keeping the current government concerned, with historical events related to the Mughal Government.
- Farhang-e-Asifiya: Based on a book of the same name. In this segment, the host discusses a number of Urdu words, idioms etc. which are used incorrectly in the society, but have become a norm. In order to rectify that, the etymology and parent words of each expression is explained.
- Bangali Baba: In this segment, political secret news is given in comedy style.
- Theater: This is the first time that a serious segment has been introduced. This segment portrays significant historical events and also tackles many social problems via theatrical enactment.
