= Chaupal TV =

Punjabi language news TV channel in Pakistan

- Country: Pakistan
- Broadcast area: South Asia
- Network: Lakson Group
- Headquarters: Lahore, Punjab, Pakistan

Programming
- Language: Punjabi
- Picture format: (1080p 16:9 MPEG-4, HDTV)

Ownership
- Owner: Sultan Ali Lakhani
- Sister channels: Express News; Express Entertainment

History
- Launched: November 4, 2025; 9 months ago

Links
- Website: express.pk

Chaupal TV (Punjabi: چوپال ٹی وی) is a Pakistani news television channel. It is a Punjabi language TV channel which covers national and international news. It is owned by Lakson Group which also runs the Express News and newspaper, Daily Express.

== History ==
Chaupal has launched as a Punjabi-language news channel under the Express Media Group in Pakistan in November 2025, with free-to-air (FTA) broadcasts available on PAKSAT-MM1 (38.2°E). This channel focuses on Punjabi news, cultural programming, and regional news coverage.

== Programs ==
- Waihra
- Goorhi Gall
- Ajj Di Gall
- Lok Raaj
- 4 Chofairay
- Khaidaan
- Parohnay
- Aye Punjabi Chhaye Punjabi
