= Banke Mian =

Bankay Mian
- First appearance: Bankay Mian Ki Qawali (2009)
- Created by: Express Media Group

In-universe information
- Full name: Bankay Mian
- Gender: Male
- Occupation: Qawwali singer
- Religion: Muslim
- Nationality: Pakistani

Bankay Mian or Bankay Mian Qawwal (Urdu: بنکے میاں) is an animated character of Pakistani television channel Express News. As evident from his name, he appears as a Qawwal on television. Bankay Mian expresses his views on politics, current affairs or other topics of interest in the form of Qawwali. Banke Mian first appeared on television on 14 August 2009.

Historically "Banka" was a popular tradition pertaining to Delhi and Lucknow. "Bankas" were those characters of these cities who emerged in the British era of India. "Bankas" pretended to be very brave people in humorous manner. But Bankay Mian is a bit different. He comments on every day issues using wit and satire.

Bankay Mian is also a columnist in the Urdu Daily Express. The name of his column is "Bankay Nama".
