= Amanullah (comedian) =

Pakistani comedian

Amanullah Khan
- امان اللہ خان
- Born: Amanullah Khan; 1950; Gujranwala, Punjab, Pakistan
- Died: 6 March 2020 (aged 70); Lahore, Punjab, Pakistan
- Employer(s): Geo News (2010–2013); Dunya News (2013–2017); Neo News (2017– 2018); AAP News (2018–2020)
- Children: 14

Comedy career
- Years active: 1977-2020
- Medium: Actor; Comedian
- Genres: Satire; Observational; Deadpan
- Subjects: Pakistani culture; Punjabi culture; Current events

Amanullah Khan (1950 – 6 March 2020), known professionally as Amanullah, was a Pakistani Punjabi theatre performer, comedian and TV artist regarded as one of the best comedians in the Indian subcontinent. He was cited as one of the world's best observational comedians as he learned through his surroundings and everyday happenings. He influenced many artists as well as people.

Amanullah began his professional career in 1977 with the play Sixer, and remained active till his death in 2020.

In a career spanning some 50 years, he performed in over 2000 stage plays.

He has a world record of 860-day night theatre plays.

According to famous Pakistani comedian Sohail Ahmed, Amanullah Khan was regarded as one of the top comedians in Pakistan as well in the Indian subcontinent. He also appeared in Khabarzar with Aftab Iqbal on Aap News.

He had 14 children, including Adnan Amanullah, a stand-up comedian and singer, and Umair Ali Amanullah, an athlete and actor.

== Early life and career ==
Amanullah was born in Chak Ramdas village of Gujranwala, Punjab, in 1950 to a common man. Although his ancestry is said to be linked to the Patiala gharana. His father and ancestors used to sing at weddings and small functions and his family had a musical background. Due to his mother's death and his father falling ill when he was very young Amanullah spent his childhood in poverty doing daily labour work and selling eatable items near Data Darbar Lahore where he used to earn 5–10 rupees a day at that time. He was the only son of his parents and has one sister. Amanullah started his career with stage comedy where he got a chance to show his talent at a very young age. He was introduced to the entertainment industry by the famous Pakistani singer of that time, Tufail Niazi. Tufail Niazi was his neighbour who discovered his talent and gave Amanullah a chance to show his comedic skills to the whole world. He quickly rose to prominence and made a name for himself in the industry. He was part of various stage dramas and took on the roles of various characters. He remains one of the senior-most stage actors who always made people laugh with his witty jokes and unique sense of humor.

Over the years Amanullah earned huge respect and love in the Pakistani society. He always stole the spotlight whenever he got the chance to perform in a drama or do stand up comedy. His dedication to the field of comedy earned him a place among the most renowned comedians in the Indian subcontinent. A few of his most well known pieces of work include stage dramas such as 'Khirki ke peechay,' Disco Deewanay,' and many others. He has been termed as the most remarkable comedian whose comedy and energy on stage was unmatchable. Amanullah has made a record of doing 860 shows in his career and also been honored with the Pride of Performance award in 2018 for his unparalleled quality of work in the Pakistani entertainment industry throughout his career. He has been attached to various television shows, including Khabarnaak and Mazaaq Raat, and has performed various characters. In 2010, Amanullah joined GEO News for its then new program Khabarnaak. He portrayed a simple, blind village man named Hakeem Sahab. The rest of the characters were bent on disparaging Hakeem Sahab. Khan left this TV show in August 2013.

He also played the role of Chacha Bashir in Mazaaq Raat. Some fellow comedians have reportedly said that Amanullah was their teacher, and they learnt comedy from him and from his comedy shows. He had a great sense of humor. His comedy acts were based on regular habits and daily lives of common people. Another famous Pakistani comedian Shakeel Siddiqui also reportedly showed a lot of respect for his work. Amanullah Khan was also known to occasionally deliver impromptu dialogue. He had also toured India and many famous Indian comedians including Kapil Sharma and Chandan Prabhakar regard him as their teacher and inspiration. Amanullah Khan was also known as "The King of Comedy" in Pakistan. Amanullah Khan, considered the undisputed king of Pakistani stage, not only won people's hearts with his exceptional acting but also actively encouraged and appreciated new actors.

During the stage play "Main Solah Baras Ki", performed in Faisalabad, he shared the stage with Nasir Chinyoti for the first time. During the performance, Amanullah Khan raised Nasir Chinyoti’s hand and predicted that he would become a great artist one day. Time proved his prediction absolutely right. Kapil Sharma considered him a mentor and a legendary artist, while Johnny Lever praised him as a great stand-up comedian and cherished their conversations. In Pakistan, renowned comedians like Sohail Ahmed (Azizi) acknowledged Amanullah’s profound influence on the comedy scene, with Iftikhar Thakur and Amanat Chan crediting him for shaping modern stage comedy. Nasir Chinyoti admired his improvisational skills, and the late Babu Baral called him a pillar of Pakistani theater. Abid Khan highlighted his innovative approach, and Shakeel Siddiqui credited him for inspiring his comedic style. Even beyond comedy, singer Atif Aslam recognized Amanullah’s influence, noting that Indian comedians considered him a teacher. His legacy continues to live on through the generations of comedians who followed his path, cementing his place as one of the greatest entertainers in South Asian history.

Amanullah was a comedian whom General Zia-ul-Haq greatly enjoyed watching and listening to. After Amanullah entered the industry, actors' salaries in Pakistan's stage sector were properly fixed, and stage drama saw a rise in popularity. Thousands of people attended stage dramas solely because of Amanullah.

In 2018, he reunited with Aftab Iqbal in Khabarzar on Aap News channel.

== Death and legacy ==
Amanullah Khan was hospitalized in January 2018. He was treated in the intensive care unit of a local hospital in Lahore but was discharged later. He was reportedly suffering from a common cold and then developed some complications. He died on 6 March 2020 due to kidney failure in a local hospital in Lahore.

Amanullah's contributions to comedy were widely recognized. He was celebrated for his ability to conduct one-man shows for extended periods, captivating audiences with his spontaneous dialogues and unique sense of humor. His dedication to the field of comedy earned him a place among the most renowned comedians in the Indian subcontinent.

== Selected filmography ==
=== Television series ===
Year	Title	Role	Channel	Notes
1978–79	Waris	Cheema Maachi	PTV Home	

=== Films ===
Title	Year
One Two Ka One	2006
Na Maloom Afraad	2014
Zindagi Guzaro Hans Ke	2018

=== Reality shows ===
- Khabarnaak (2010–2013)
- Mazaaq Raat (2013–17)
- Khabarzar (2018–2020)
- The Great Indian Laughter Challenge (2005)

=== Stage-o-graphy ===
Amanullah Khan had appeared in many stage dramas. Some of them are listed below:

- Begum Dish Antenna
- Disco Deewanay
- Khirki Ke Peechay
- Muhabbat CNG
- UPS
- Shartiya Mithay
- Sohni Chan Wargi
- Bara Maza Aye Ga
- Ketchup
- Chan Makhna
- Ghar Ghar Bashira
- Sawa Sair
- Solah Baras Ke

== Awards and recognition ==
- Pride of Performance Award by the President of Pakistan in 2018.
