= Majid Jahangir =

Pakistani comic actor (died 2023)

- ماجد جہانگیر
- Born: 1949; Karachi, Sindh, Pakistan
- Died: 10 January 2023 (aged 73–74); Lahore, Punjab, Pakistan
- Occupations: Actor; Comedian
- Years active: 1979 – 2015
- Known for: Comedy caricatures in TV show Fifty-Fifty
- Television: PTV
- Spouse: Saba Majid
- Children: 4
- Awards: Pride of Performance Award (1981); Tamgha-e-Imtiaz (Medal of Distinction) (2020)

Abdul Majid Jahangir (1949 – 10 January 2023) was a Pakistani comic actor. He was best known for his comedy roles and caricatures in PTV's show Fifty-Fifty.

== Early life and career ==
Majid Jahangir was born in Karachi. His father was from Punjab and his mother from Hyderabad Deccan.

Jahangir started his acting career in Moin Akhtar's show Saat Rang which was aired on PTV. In 1979, he starred in PTV's comedy show Fifty Fifty along with Ismail Tara, Zeba Shehnaz, Bushra Ansari, and Ashraf Khan. The show became popular across the country, and so did the cast. Majid remained in the lead cast of the show until it stopped airing in 1985. Then, Majid moved to the United States and lived there for the next 23 years. On returning to Pakistan, he resumed his career by participating in Aamir Liaquat Hussain's shows for Geo TV and in the comedy show Khabarnaak.

Jahangir performed in more than 35 stage shows and in 4 Urdu films during his career spanning over two decades.

== Personal life and death ==
Jahangir's wife Saba Majid died in 2020. Since 2016, he had been suffering from partial paralysis and other critical health issues accompanied by severe financial problems.

Jahangir died in Lahore, Pakistan on 10 January 2023.

He had four children, two sons and two daughters.

== Television shows ==
Year	Title	Role	Network
1979–1985	Fifty-Fifty	Various comedy caricatures	PTV
2010–2021	Khabarnaak		Geo TV

== Awards and recognition ==
Year	Award	Category	Result	Work	Ref.
1981	Pride of Performance Award	Arts (acting)	Won	Fifty-Fifty (PTV comedy show)	
2020	Tamgha-e-Imtiaz (Medal of Distinction)	Arts (acting)	Won	Lifetime achievement award	
