= Express News =

Express News may refer to:

- Express News (TV channel), a Pakistan private TV channel
- Daily Express, an Urdu newspaper in Pakistan
- Express Newspapers, a British newspaper group
- San Antonio Express-News, an American daily newspaper
