= Hasb-e-Haal =

2009 Pakistani comedy television show

- Opening title screen in 2011
- حسبِ حال
- Genre: Comedy; Sketch comedy Satire; Political satire
- Directed by: Khurram Shahzad
- Presented by: Fareed Raees
- Starring: Sohail Ahmed
- Country of origin: Pakistan
- Original language: Urdu
- No. of episodes: 3000+

Production
- Editor: Imran Kazmi
- Camera setup: Multi-camera setup
- Running time: 42 minutes
- Production company: Dunya News

Original release
- Network: Dunya News
- Release: January 9, 2009 – present

Hasb-e-Haal (Urdu: حسبِ حال, lit. '"Appropriately"') is a Pakistani Urdu-language comedy show based on political satire that airs on Dunya News at 11:05 pm from Thursday to Sunday. It stars Sohail Ahmed, Fareed Raees, Amanat Chan, Nawaz Anjum, Jiya Dilnawaz, Zulfi Ali and Goga Ji. It was first hosted by Aftab Iqbal as an anchor, Najia Baig as the co-anchor and Sohail Ahmed as a guest.

Sohail Ahmed was awarded the Presidential Pride of Performance award by Asif Zardari on 23 March 2011 for his performance on the show.

== History ==
Hasb-e-Haal was launched on 9 January 2009. Its idea basically comes from the old shows "Jamhoor Di Awaaz" and "Nizam Din Di Baithak". Aftab Iqbal used to host the show at that time with co-host Najia Baig and comedian Sohail Ahmed. The show was an instant hit. In April 2010, Iqbal left the show due to undisclosed reasons. From April 2010 to March 2023, Junaid Saleem hosted the show. In 2016 Najia Baig left the show and its cast was changed with the appearance of Jia Dilnawaz, Nawaz Anjum, Amanat Chan, Muhammad Ramzan and Yawar Dawood.

== Concept ==
Hasb-e-Haal is a comedy program that offers commentary and satire on current affairs. Sohail Ahmed plays the character of a lower-middle-class man who is frequently reprimanded by Fareed Raees because of his broad generalizations and over-simplification of complex political issues. Jiya Dilnawaz offers queues for laugh lines and reads viewer's comments in the show.

== Cast ==
=== Host ===
- Ali Mumtaz (2025-present)

=== Guests ===
- Sohail Ahmed as Azizi and various characters
- Amanat Chan as Ghauri and various characters
- Nawaz Anjum as Thayla and various characters
- Rana Muhammad Ramzan as Goga Ji and various characters
- Yawar Dawood as Zulfi and various characters
- Jia Dilnawaz (Co-host)(2016-continued)

=== Former members ===
- Aftab Iqbal (Host)(2009-2010)
- Najia Baig (Co-Host)(2009-2016)
- Junaid Saleem (Host)(2010-2023)
- Fareed Raees (Host)(2023-2025)

== Cultural effect ==
Due to the popularity of the show, several similar shows emerged. These include Khabarnaak on Geo News, Khabardaar on Express News, 3 Idiots on Aaj TV, Masti Gate on ARY News, Mazaaq Raat on Dunya News and News Night on Din News.
