= Shartiya Mithay =

Pakistani comedy stage play

- Original language: Punjabi
- Written by: Babu Baral Sohail Ahmed
- Characters: Roshan; Chiraag; Dada Ji; Abba Ji; Shirin
- Subject: Begging, marriage
- Genre: Comedy
- Setting: Lahore theatre, 1995

Premiere
- Date: 1995
- Place: Lahore
- Directed by: Babu Baral Sohail Ahmed

Shartiya Mithay (شرطیہ مٹھے) (English: Guaranteed Sweet) is a famous and hit Punjabi comedy stage play from Pakistan. The cast included Amanullah, Sohail Ahmed, Babu Baral, Zarqa Butt, Khalid Abbas Dar, Ashraf Rahi, Sohnia Abbas, Abid Khan and Sahiba.

It was written and directed by Babu Baral and Sohail Ahmed. Both also acted in the play.

== Characters ==
Roshan

One of two blind brothers. He and his brother want to get married but always get rejected because of their blindness.

Chiraag

The other blind brother.

Dada Ji

The flirting grandfather of Chiraag and Roshan. He runs a Tuck shop and talks to a picture of "Sonali Bendre" (who was the brand ambassador of a tea brand in Pakistan in the early 90s). He wants to get married for the fourth time.

Abba Ji

The strict father of the blind brothers. He wants to turn his sons into beggars.

Shirin

A young female journalism student who is writing a column on beggars, and wants to interview Roshan.

== Cast ==
- Amanullah as Roshan
- Sohail Ahmed as Dada Ji
- Babu Baral as Chiraag
- Zarqa Butt as Bharjai/Bhabi
- Khalid Abbas Dar
- Ashraf Rahi
- Sohnia Abbas
- Abid Khan as Abba Ji
- Sahiba as Shirin
