= Zeba Shehnaz =

Pakistani actress

- زیبا شہناز
- Born: 11 July 1952 (age 74); Karachi, Pakistan
- Education: University of Karachi
- Occupations: Actress, comedian, host, voice actress
- Years active: 1963 – present
- Awards: Tamgha-e-Imtiaz (Medal of Excellence) Award by the President of Pakistan in 2021

Zeba Shehanz (Urdu: زیبا شہناز; born 11 July 1952) is a Pakistani actress, comedian, host and voice actress known for her work on television and theater. Shehnaz rose to fame in the late 1970s for her work in comedies such as Fifty Fifty (1978). For her performance in Shamim Ara's Munda Bigra Jaey (1995), she won Nigar Award for Best Supporting Actress. She is the recipient of the President's Tamgha-e-Imtiaz as well.

== Early life ==
Zeba was born on 11 July 1952 in Lahore, Pakistan. She completed her studies from University of Lahore. She acted in theater plays and did many comedy shows with Moin Akhter.

== Career ==
She made her debut as a child actress on PTV in the 1960s. She is best known for portraying 108 characters in Fifty Fifty along with Moin Akhter. She also appeared in dramas Baityaan, Umrao Jan Ada and Mera Yaar Miladay. She also appeared in movie Munda Bigra Jaey in 1995. She did theater for 12 years and she also voiced Parrot in 3 Bahadur: The Revenge of Baba Balaam. For her contributions towards the television industry, she was honored by the Government of Pakistan with Tamgha-e-Imtiaz in 2021.

== Personal life ==
Zeba is unmarried. She was the aunt of Mohammed Shah Subhani who died in 2019.

== Filmography ==
=== Television ===
Year	Title	Role	Network
1976	Bandish	Mrs. Disuza	PTV
1978	Fifty Fifty	Herself	PTV
1982	Jaidi	Bibi	PTV
1983	Silver Jubilee	Begum Pachida	PTV
1985	Kese Kese Khwab	Najma	PTV
1986	Gharama	Shela	PTV
1993	Ainak Wala Jin	Jadogarni	PTV
1998	Such Much	Hawwa	PTV
2002	Darwaza	Begum Qadir	PTV
2003	Umrao Jaan Ada	Ami Jan	Geo Entertainment
2009	Ghar Beetiyan	Khala	PTV
2009	Thori Si Khushiyaan	Amma Ji	Hum TV
2009	Baityaan	Dadu	Hum TV
2011	Aurat Ka Ghar Konsa	Chanda Khala	PTV
2012	Bache Hamry Ehed K	Begum Sheikh	PTV
2012	Baji	Shakeela	PTV
2014	Mazaaq Raat	Herself	Dunya News
2014	Bashar Momin	Bashar's Tai	Geo Entertainment
2015	Khatoon Manzil	Shireen	ARY Digital
2015	Googly Mohalla	Pari Gul	PTV
2016	Mohay Piya Rang Laaga	Salma	ARY Digital
2016	Mera Yaar Miladay	Salma	ARY Digital
2022	Susralies	Farkhanda	TV One
2023	Taweez	Dadi	Mun TV
2025	Ishq Tumse Hua	Razia	Green Entertainment
2025	Filhal	Nusrat	Aaj Entertainment
2026	Bus Aik Hum Hi	Sara's grandmother	PTV

=== Telefilm ===
Year	Title	Role
1987	Ek Din Ka Baadshah	Shabbo
2015	Kya Yeh Hi Pyar Hai	Fasi's mother
2016	Mushtari	Mushtari Bi
2016	Aashiq Colony	Shabban
2018	Rok Sako To Rok Lo	Batool
2021	Mera Ishrat Meri Marzi	Shagufta's mother
2022	Siwaiyaan	Ahsan's grandmother
2023	Hissay Ki Eid	Tarannum's mother
2025	Ghost Meri Dost	Samad's mother

=== Film ===
Year	Title	Language
1972	Mohabbat	Urdu
1993	Vah Kya Baat Hay	Urdu
1993	Hathi Meray Sathi	Urdu
1995	Munda Bigra Jaey	Urdu
1996	Muamla Garbar Hay	Urdu
1996	Chief Sahib	Urdu
1996	Miss Istanbul	Urdu
1997	Mohabbat Hay Kya Cheez	Urdu
1999	Chupkay Chupkay	Urdu
1999	Qismat	Urdu
2012	Hazar Ka Note	Urdu
2016	3 Bahadur: The Revenge of Baba Balaam	Urdu

== Awards and recognition ==
Year	Award	Category	Result	Title	Ref.
1995	Nigar Awards	Best Supporting Actress	Won	Munda Bigra Jaey	
2005	1st Indus Drama Awards	Special Award for Performance	Won	Fifty Fifty	
2021	Tamgha-e-Imtiaz (Medal of Excellence)	Award by the President of Pakistan	Won	Contribution to Industry	
