= Nasir Chinyoti =

Pakistani actor

- ناصر چنیوٹی
- Born: 25 November 1970 (age 55); Chiniot, Punjab, Pakistan
- Occupations: Actor; Comedian
- Years active: 1990–present
- Notable work: Chal Mera Putt; Chal Mera Putt 2; Chal Mera Putt 3; khabardaar

Comedy career
- Medium: Stand-up; Television; Film
- Genres: Observational comedy; Black comedy; Insult comedy; Physical comedy

Nasir Chinyoti (ناصر چنیوٹی) is a Pakistani actor and comedian who has starred in many stage dramas and films in both Urdu and Punjabi.

He is mostly active in the Lahore theatre circuit and is famous for using improvised dialogues during his stage performances.

Nasir Chinyoti has acted with many well-known Punjabi stage comedians including Babu Baral, Sohail Ahmad, Iftikhar Thakur, Zafri Khan, Anwar Ali, Tariq Teddy and Sakhawat Naz.

He has also collaborated with Aftab Iqbal in many television shows.

== Early life and career ==
Nasir was born in Chiniot, in Pakistan's Punjab province, on 25 November 1970. His father owned a food stall while Nasir trained to be a professional carpenter. He later moved to Lahore for a better pay.

He started his acting career in theatre in Faisalabad.

== Filmography ==
=== Television serials and shows ===
Year	Title	Channel
1997	Family Front	PTV
2010	Khabarnaak	Geo News
2015–2018	Khabardaar	Express News
2018–2020	Khabarzar	Neo News
2020–2021	Khabaryar	Neo News
2021–2022	Khabardaar	Express News
2022	Khabarhar	Samaa TV
2023	Mastiyan	Suno News

=== Films ===
Key
†	Denotes films that have not yet been released

Year	Movie	Role	Country
2006	One Two Ka One		Pakistan
2008	Gulabo		Pakistan
2013	No Tension		Pakistan
2019	Chal Mera Putt	Tabrez	India
2020	Jalvey		Pakistan
2020	Chal Mera Putt 2	Tabrez	India
2021	Chal Mera Putt 3	Tabrez	India
2022	Aaja Mexico Challiye	Waqar	India
2022	Honeymoon	Billa	India
2023	Annhi Dea Mazaak Ae	Daboo	India
2023	Super Punjabi	Miskeen Butt	Pakistan
2023	Carry on Jatta 3	Meet's uncle	India
2024	Dilaa Mereya	Rangoo	India
2024	Jatt & Juliet 3		India
2025	Sardaar Ji 3	TT	India
TBA	Maujaan Hi Maujaan†		India
TBA	Mann Vs Khan†		India
