= Jahannum Ba'raasta Jannat =

2026 Pakistani television series

- Genre: Drama
- Written by: Hussain Sahab
- Directed by: Hussain Sahab
- Starring: Umer Aalam; Momina Iqbal
- Country of origin: Pakistan
- Original language: Urdu
- No. of episodes: 19

Production
- Producer: Multiverse Entertainment

Original release
- Network: Green Entertainment
- Release: 29 March – 24 May 2026

Jahannum Ba'raasta Jannat (transl. Hell Through Heaven) is a 2026 Pakistani television series. The series premiered on Green Entertainment on 29 March 2026. It stars Umer Aalam and Momina Iqbal in lead roles along with Bushra Ansari, Javed Sheikh, Saima Qureshi and Mizna Waqas.

== Cast ==
- Umer Aalam as Jabbar Khan
- Momina Iqbal as Zarqa
- Iqbal Hussain as Mullah Zahirullah
- Bushra Ansari as Gopi
- Javed Sheikh as RAW Commander
- Sachal Afzal as Babrik Khan
- Shamyl Khan as Salaar Khan
- Ayub Khoso as Rasheed Khan
- Mizna Waqas as Gul Bano
- Saima Qureshi as Shaheena Bibi
