= Bhaid =

- Genre: Infotainment
- Starring: Mohsin Ahmad
- Country of origin: Pakistan
- Original language: Urdu

Production
- Production location: Pakistan
- Running time: 20 minutes (per episode)

Original release
- Network: Express News

Bhaid is a Pakistani television show, focusing on Infotainment. The show airs on the news channel, Express News. The show airs every Tuesday from 19:30-20:30 PST and is hosted by Mohsin Ahmad.

== Concept ==
Bhaid revolves around unexplained stories which are explained through scientific advancement, religious mythology, history, research and investigations. Research and Script by Imran Shamshad Narmi & Hosted by Mohsin Ahmad, the show is a series of documentaries based over myths and mysteries giving out versions of people belonging to different school of thoughts like philosophy, sciences, religion etc.

== Credits ==
- Mohsin Ahmad - Producer, Director and Presenter
- Imran Shamshad Narmi - Researcher & Script Writer
- Rasheed Ahmed - Snr. Producer
- Sajid saleem, Ashfaq Ahmed, Faraz Abedi - Associate producer(s)
