= Loose Talk =

Loose Talk may refer to:

- Loose Talk (British TV series), a 1983 chat show
- Loose Talk (Pakistani TV series), a 2002–2008 comedy show
- "Loose Talk" (song), a 1954 song written by Hardy Turner and Freddie Hart
- Loose Talk, a side project formed by three members of the band Anberlin
