= Mein Kahani Hun =

- Genre: Anthology drama
- Country of origin: Pakistan
- Original language: Urdu

Production
- Producer: Babar Javed
- Production company: BJ Productions

Original release
- Network: Express Entertainment
- Release: 4 September 2023

Mein Kahani Hun is a 2023 Pakistani anthology television series produced by Babar Javed under the banner of BJ Productions. The series premiered on Express Entertainment in September 2023. It features independent storylines and different casts across its episodes.

== Seasons ==
The series has been released in three seasons. Each season features standalone stories with different characters and casts. The first season premiered on 4 September 2023 on Express Entertainment. It featured multiple independent stories with different casts. The second season continued the anthology format, featuring new stories and performers. Express Entertainment published episodes under the second season title on its official website. The third season premiered on 27 September 2026 on Express Entertainment. It introduced another collection of standalone stories, with Nauman Ijaz and Savera Nadeem among its cast members.

== Cast ==
The series features an ensemble cast, including:

- Faysal Quraishi
- Beenish Chohan
- Shamim Hilaly
- Syed Mohammad Ahmed
- Aijaz Aslam
- Sunita Marshall
- Javed Sheikh
- Hina Dilpazeer
- Kaiser Khan Nizamani
- Omer Shahzad
- Arez Ahmed
