= Abid Khan (actor) =

Pakistani actor

- Born: Muhammad Abid Khan; 6 November 1953; Gujranwala, Pakistan
- Died: 19 August 2000 (aged 46); Islamabad Barri Imam Sarkar
- Other name: عابد خان
- Occupation: Actor

Abid Khan (1953–2000), also known as Muhammad Abid Khan, was a Pakistani comedian, stage and TV actor.

== Career ==
Abid Khan was best known as a stage comedian, though he also appeared in television dramas and films. Among his notable performances was Shartiya Mithay, in which he portrayed the father of Babu Baral and Amanullah.

His notable television serial was Alao (1994), Aahlna (1999), Ali Baba (1985), Khoji (1990), Family Front (1999), Suraj kay Sath Sath (1988), which aired on PTV.

== Death ==
Abid passed away on 19 August 2000 while performing a pilgrimage at the shrine of Hazrat Bari Imam in Islamabad.
