= Muhafiz (TV series) =

Pakistani television series

- Genre: Action; Romance; Drama
- Written by: Sadia Akhtar
- Directed by: Syed Ramish Rizvi
- Starring: Junaid Khan; Momina Iqbal; Sohail Sameer
- Country of origin: Pakistan
- Original language: Urdu
- No. of episodes: 42

Production
- Producers: Abdullah Kadwani; Asad Qureshi
- Production company: 7th Sky Entertainment

Original release
- Network: Geo Entertainment
- Release: 30 June – 11 August 2026

Muhafiz (Urdu: محافظ) is a Pakistani television drama series produced by 7th Sky Entertainment. Written by Sadia Akhtar and directed by Syed Ramish Rizvi, it stars Junaid Khan, Momina Iqbal and Sohail Sameer in leading roles. The series premiered on Geo Entertainment on 30 June 2026 and concluded on 11 August 2026.

== Plot ==
The story follows Zawar, a police officer whose professional and personal circumstances lead him away from the police force. His life changes after he rescues Paras, the daughter of Behzad, a powerful man facing security threats. Behzad subsequently appoints Zawar as Paras's bodyguard. Although Paras initially resents his presence, their relationship gradually develops as they navigate personal differences, danger and emotional conflicts.

== Cast ==
- Junaid Khan as Zawar Bakht
- Momina Iqbal as Paras Behzad
- Sohail Sameer as Behzad
- Yousuf Bashir Qureshi as Aijaz
- Junaid Akhtar as Aftab
- Shaheen Khan as Saleema
- Dodi Khan as Wahab Durrani
- Ayesha Gul as Shaheen
- Shamyl Khan as Nadeem
- Areej Chaudhary as Resham
- Javed Jamal as Abdul
- Malaika Riaz as Mariam
- Fatima Gohar as Mahrukh
- Hassan Shah as Sikandar

== Production ==
Muhafiz was presented by 7th Sky Entertainment, with Abdullah Kadwani and Asad Qureshi serving as producers. The screenplay was written by Sadia Akhtar and the series was directed by Syed Ramish Rizvi. The principal cast includes Junaid Khan and Momina Iqbal, who portray the central characters Zawar and Paras.

== Broadcast ==
The series premiered on Geo Entertainment on 30 June 2026. It was broadcast daily at 9:00 pm Pakistan Standard Time. The final episode was scheduled to air on 11 August 2026, completing its 42-episode run.
