= Naeem Bokhari =

Pakistani lawyer & television personality (born 1948)

- نعیم بخاری
- Born: 23 March 1948 (age 78)
- Education: St. Anthony High School, Government College University (Lahore), Punjab University Law College (PULC), Lahore
- Occupations: Lawyer, TV Personality
- Organization: Pakistan Television Corporation
- Television: Khabarnaak
- Relatives: Saleem Altaf (brother)

Syed Naeem Altaf Bokhari (Punjabi, Urdu: نعیم بخاری; born 23 March 1948) is a Pakistani lawyer and television personality. Previously, he has hosted Khabarnaak on a Pakistani news channel Geo News. On 23 November 2020, he has been appointed Chairman of Pakistan Television Corporation.

== Early life ==
Bokhari was born in Lahore, Pakistan to Dr Syed Altaf Hussain Bokhari. He is the younger brother of Pakistani fast bowler Saleem Altaf Bokhari. He graduated from Government College University, Lahore. He then studied law in Punjab University Law College, He served as the editor of "Al-Meezan" (PULC's official magazine).He was the favourite student of Barrister Ijaz Hussain Batalvi who taught there for more than fifty years.

== Personal life ==
He first married popular ghazal singer Tahira Syed. Bokhari has two children, a son, Hasnain and a daughter, Kiran with his first wife, both of whom are lawyers by profession. Kiran is married and working in New York City. Hasnain is married and working in Muscat, Oman with OMRAN, the Government of the Sultanate of Oman's master developer for tourism projects. Bokhari married Tamannah Khan Bokhari in 1995 and has a son with his second wife, Abbas, who is also following in his fathers footsteps in becoming a lawyer and has completed his Bachelor's in law from Pakistan and is undertaking his BAR from the United Kingdom. He also has two more daughters, Noor Fatima who also has a masters from SOAS in Law and is currently working at RIA BARKER GILLETE and Noor Zainab who is currently undertaking her studies in Pakistan.

In May 2018 he suffered serious injuries when he fell in London underground station. He suffered major head and rib injuries. He and London police dismissed reports that he was attacked.

Naeem Bokhari belongs to a noble family. His father "Dr. Syed Altaf Hussain Bokhari " was a famous doctor in the walled city Lahore; as his Grandfather "Dr. Syed Tufail Hussain Bukhari" was. Naeem Bukhari's Great-grandfather was a spiritual personality named "Peer Syed Fida Hussain Bukhari". Bukhari claims to be Lahori from 6 generations before that his ancestors were from Syedanwali Sialkot.

== Career ==
=== Television ===
In 2015 Bokhari joined Khabarnak, a talk show on Geo TV, replacing Aftab Iqbal. He hosted other talk shows, including Apne Andaz Se and Naeem Bokhari ke saath on which he interviewed many guests. He interviewed Imran Khan during his work at Khabarnak.

== Chaudhry controversy ==
His open letter against Chief Justice Iftikhar Mohammed Chaudhry published on Feb 16, 2007 created a controversy. This led to the dismissal of the Chief Justice by President Pervez Musharraf. The Punjab Bar Council reacted after March 9, 2007, when the controversy had reached its peak and dismissed his membership in Punjab Bar Council. Later on, his membership was renewed.

On 9 March 2007, President Musharraf fired Chaudhry. Most of the charges listed against him were contained in a letter written by Bokhari. A copy of the letter was placed before the CJP when he was called to the Army House that day.

Most of the alleged charges against Chaudhry were related to his son Arsalan Iftikhar's police career while he was a doctor in the Baluchistan government. When the reference against CJP was brought to the Supreme Judicial Council, those in the government who had been facilitating Iftikhar's son were ready to speak against him.

Bokhari's letter contained the name of Interior Minister Aftab Sherpao, whose ministry had issued orders to treat Arsalan with extra care and then allowing him to get police training along with probationers of the Police Service of Pakistan (PSP Cadre). The letter mentioned that the junior VVIP got special treatment because of his father. Later, Arsalan was appointed to FIA on deputation after seeking the written consent of the Federal Interior Minister; Naeem Bokhari gave details.

== Joining PTI ==
On 18 June 2016, Naeem Bukhari joined the Pakistan Tehreek-e-Insaf and formally announced his association the same evening. Speaking on the occasion, Imran Khan thanked the lawyer for joining the PTI and expressed the hope that he would be helpful in party's struggle against corruption.

== Chairman of PTV ==
On 23 November 2020, Prime Minister Imran Khan appointed him as Chairman of Pakistan Television Corporation.
