= Baityaan =

- Baityaan title screen
- Genre: Family
- Created by: Momina Duraid
- Starring: Abid Ali; Savera Nadeem; Farhan Ali Agha; Qavi Khan; Tooba Siddiqui; Zeba Shehnaz
- Country of origin: Pakistan
- No. of episodes: 28

Production
- Production locations: Karachi, Pakistan
- Running time: 45–50 minutes (per episode)

Original release
- Network: Hum TV
- Release: 28 April – 1 July 2009

Baityaan, (Urdu: بیٹیاں, lit. 'Daughters') is a Pakistani drama serial written by Atif Ali and directed by Ali Ahmed, shown on Hum TV in 2009.

== Plot ==
It is the story of a middle-class family's struggles and triumphs. The family, led by Ansari Sahib and his wife, includes their three daughters: Samina, Amina, and Rubina. Each daughter has her own unique struggles. Samina, the sensitive one, yearns to work and support her family financially. Amina, who struggles with low self-esteem due to her skin color, seeks acceptance and love. Rubina, the youngest, dreams of a better life, frustrated with their impoverished lifestyle. Their aunt, Bilquis Begum, holds a grudge against the family and opposes her son Rehan's desire to marry Rubina. However, fate has other plans. As Samina starts her new job, she faces unforeseen challenges. Rubina's life takes a complicated turn when she marries a man with a suspicious nature. Meanwhile, Rehan's affections shift towards Amina, leading him to make a life-changing decision that transforms her life forever.

== Cast ==
- Abid Ali
- Azfar Rehman
- Farhan Ali Agha
- Hasan Niazi
- Syed Jibran
- Qavi Khan
- Saveera Nadeem
- Tooba Siddiqui
- Zeba Shehnaz
