= Fifty Fifty (Pakistani TV series) =

- DVD cover
- Genre: Sketch comedy
- Created by: Anwar Maqsood
- Directed by: Shoaib Mansoor
- Country of origin: Pakistan
- Original language: Urdu

Production
- Producers: PTV Productions; Shoman Productions
- Production locations: Karachi, Pakistan
- Running time: 60 minutes (per episode)

Original release
- Network: Pakistan Television Corporation Network
- Release: 1978 – 1984

Fifty Fifty (Urdu script: ففٹی ففٹی) is a popular Pakistan Television Corporation sketch comedy series that was aired on the national television PTV from 1978 to 1984, based loosely on the American comedy show Saturday Night Live. Many critics considered it one of the best television shows to be produced in Pakistan.

The content of the show includes satire and parody, with some slapstick comedy. It is widely considered to be a trendsetter in its genre, with its content being ethnically balanced and written to respect all Pakistani communities. Regulars on the show included TV actors Ismail Tara, Zeba Shehnaz, Ashraf Khan, Majid Jahangir, and Khalid Abbas Dar. Some golden-era songs by Naheed Akhtar and Ghulam Ali were also featured on the show. It was produced and directed by acclaimed Pakistani film and TV director Shoaib Mansoor and written by Anwar Maqsood.

Fifty Fifty and Alif Noon were the two prominent comedy series on Pakistani television in the 1980s. Their writers were regarded as being dedicated to creativity and patriotic values, and that is why they are still the most-in-demand comedy serials.

== Cast ==
- Majid Jahangir
- Ismail Tara
- Zeba Shehnaz
- Ashraf Khan
- Bushra Ansari
- Durdana Butt
- Arshad Mehmood
- Asma Abbas
- Javed Sheikh
- Mukhtiar Surhio
- Latif Kapadia
- Pandit Satyanashi
- Salahuddin Toofani
- Umer Shareef
- Anwar Maqsood
- Fareed Khan
- Ghulam Mustafa
- Moin Akhtar
- Khalid Abbas Dar

== Awards ==
Year	Award	Category	Recipient(s)	Result
2005	1st Indus Drama Awards	Special Award for Direction	Shoaib Mansoor	Won
2005	1st Indus Drama Awards	Special Award for Performance	Zeba Shehnaz	Won
