= Aaja Mexico Challiye =

2022 Indian Punjabi-language thriller drama film

- Theatrical release poster
- Directed by: Rakesh Dhawan
- Written by: Rakesh Dhawan
- Produced by: Rahil Abbas; Ammy Virk
- Starring: Ammy Virk; Nasir Chinyoti; Zafri Khan; Yasaman Mohsani
- Cinematography: Navneet Misser
- Edited by: Manish More
- Music by: Bhai Manna Singh, Gurmeet Singh and Avvy Sra
- Production companies: Ammy Virk Productions; Thind Motion Films
- Release date: 25 February 2022
- Running time: 152 minutes
- Country: India
- Language: Punjabi

Aaja Mexico Challiye (transl. Come, let's go to Mexico) is a 2022 Indian Punjabi-language thriller drama film directed by Rakesh Dhawan starring Ammy Virk, Nasir Chinyoti and Yasaman Mohsani.

== Plot ==
The story of this film revolves around Ammy Virk's character Pamma and his "donkey flight" voyage to enter the United States by crossing the jungles of Mexico unbeknownst to the risks of the journey.

== Cast ==
- Ammy Virk as Parminder "Pamma" Singh
- Nasir Chinyoti as Waqaar
- Zafri Khan as Guddu
- Sukhwinder Chahal as Pamma's father
- Honey Mattu as Jerry
- Mintu Kappa as Makkhan
- Yasaman Mohsani as Yaza
- Harpreet Kaler as Jagri
- Baljinder Kaur as Pamma's mother
- Aman Kaur Deer as Satwant, Pamma's sister
- Sikander Ghuman as Shehbaaz's father

== Soundtrack ==
Track listing
No.	Title	Lyrics	Music	Singer(s)	Length
1.	"Safran Te"	Bir Singh	Bhai Manna Singh	Bir Singh	2:12
2.	"Ser Nai Palosda"	Harmanjeet	Gurmeet Singh	Ammy Virk	3:15
3.	"Bhali Kare Kartar"	Bir Singh	Bhai Manna Singh	Ammy Virk & Bir Singh	3:12
4.	"Amreeka Wale"	Happy Raikoti	Avvy Sra	Happy Raikoti	2:10
Total length:					10:49

== Release and reception ==
The film premiered in Dubai on 24 February 2022.

Neha Vashisht of The Times of India gave the film a rating of four out of five stars wrote that "A big shout out to the writer and director of the movie Rakesh Dhawan, who has come up with such a brave concept. He has also done the dialogues and the screenplay of the movie, which has kept the whole plot together. The jokes and punches in the movie are simply effortless and will make you laugh instantly. At the same time, when it comes to the portrayal of heavy emotions, the movie has the power to leave you with teary eyes".
