= Khabardaar =

Television series

- خبردار نقالو سے ھوشیار
- Genre: Comedy; Satire; Farce
- Written by: Aftab Iqbal
- Presented by: Aftab Iqbal
- Starring: Aftab Iqbal; Nasir Chinyoti; Zafri Khan; Babbu Rana (Babar Fateh Ali Khan); Azhar Rangeela; Waseem Punu; Asad Kaifi; Mubeen Gabol; Maira Khan; Soniya Multani; Ukasha Gul; Javed Islam; Peeran Ditta; Waheed Khan; Saqi Khan; Dr Arooba Tariq Abubakar Khan Researcher
- Country of origin: Pakistan
- Original languages: Urdu; Punjabi
- No. of seasons: 2

Production
- Executive producer: Syed Mohsin Iqbal
- Producer: Syed ghazi ali shah faheem waqas
- Production location: Pakistan
- Editor: Syed Sibet -E-Haider Naqvi
- Camera setup: Multicamera
- Running time: 30-36 minutes

Original release
- Network: Express News
- Release: 10 September 2015 – 31 December 2021

Khabardar (Urdu:خبردار) is an Urdu and Punjabi comedy television show created and hosted by Aftab Iqbal, and broadcast on Express News. The first season of the show had its premiere on 10 September 2015, aired at 11:03 pm on Thursdays, Fridays, Saturdays and Sundays on Express News from 2015 to 2018. Khabardar returned for its second season on 21 January 2021.

== History ==
Iqbal quit from GEO show Khabarnaak which he had started in 2010 and started hosting Khabardaar on Express News in August 2015. He was joined by fellow stars Agha Majid, Rubi Anam and Honey Albela on the show. In addition, Nasir Chinioti was made part of the cast. Majid left the show in December 2016.

Iqbal and the cast left the show in April 2018 to start Khabarzar on Aap News.

Iqbal and his team once again joined Express News in January 2021 for the second season.

== Premise ==
The series revolves around Aftab Iqbal and his team of comedians, including Honey Albela, Babbu Rana, Asad Kaifi, Mubeen Gabol and Azhar Rangeela, who play various characters. Each episode unfolds in three parts with the first part being a comic skit. The second and third parts involve the comedians commenting on current events.

== Cast ==
=== Season 1 ===
==== Main ====
- Aftab Iqbal (Host)

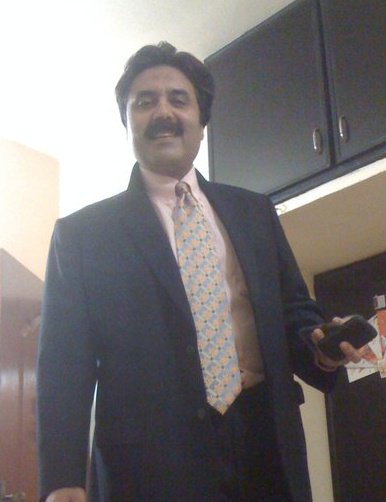
Aftab Iqbal

- Honey Albela as himself / Sikander Unani / Teddy
- Nasir Chinyoti as himself / Hanif "Teera" / Chowdhury / Gabbar Singh / The Godfather
- Saleem Albela as himself and various characters
- Agha Majid as Aaroo Grenade / SHO
- Rubi Anam as Sadak and various characters
- Babbu Rana (Babar Fateh Ali Khan) as himself and various characters
- Naseer Bhai as himself
- Eshal Ali (Co-Host)
- Abubakar Khan as Nidhal (Researcher)

==== Recurring ====
- Naseem Vicky as himself and various characters
- Sardar Kamal as himself and various characters
- Ayub Mirza as himself / Sheetal
- Lucky Dear as himself and various characters
- Azhar Rangeela as himself / Aslam Sukhera / Bittu Bhai
- Asad Kaifi as himself / Jago / Man Singh
- Maira Khan as herself / Baano / Farhi / Heer / Mehru / Maryam Nawaz'mimic / Raadha
- Mubeen Gabol as Shahrukh Khan's mimic
- Abdul Rehman Amjad (Researcher)
- Mariyam Ali Hussain (Co-Host)

=== Season 2 ===
==== Main ====
- Aftab Iqbal (Host)
- Babbu Rana (Babar Fateh Ali Khan) as himself / Pathanay Khan / Rana Jamil Zaidi / Shahid Khaqan Abbasi's mimic / Narendra Modi's mimic / Shakur (Usman Buzdar's advisor) / Meghan Markle's mimic / Veeru / TRY / Kambdi (Bollywood actor)
- Azhar Rangeela as himself / Aslam Sukhera / Bittu Bhai / Bhai (Anjaanay Khan's brother)
- Asad Kaifi as himself / Jago / Man Singh / Sippy
- Mubeen Gabol as Rana Sanaullah's mimic / Shahrukh Khan's mimic / Yousaf Raza Gillani's mimic / Arnab Goswami's mimic / Shehbaz Sharif's mimic / Sherry Rehman's mimic / Begada / Asif Ali Zardari's mimic / Kamran Khan's mimic / Usman Buzdar's mimic / Queen Elizabeth's mimic / Matkoo
- Maira Khan as herself / Baano / Farhi / Heer / Mehru / Maryam Nawaz'mimic / Sehar / Raadha
- Soniya Multani as herself / Basanti and various characters
- Ukasha Gul as herself / Mughniyeh / Shammo / (Temporary Co-Host)
- Javed Islam as himself
- Peeran Ditta as Nagi
- Dr Arooba Tariq (Co-Host) / (Temporary Host)

==== Recurring ====
- Waseem Punu as himself / Ambar / Prince Harry's mimic
- Waheed Khan as Amir Khan's mimic / Hassan Nisar's mimic / Lala Afghani / Sahir Lodhi's mimic / Birbal / Nawazuddin Siddiqui's mimic / Rashid Latif's mimic
- Saqi Khan as himself and various characters
- Zafri Khan as himself / Jugnu / Thakur / Altan
- Nasir Chinyoti as himself / Chowdhury / Gabbar Singh / The Godfather / Hanif "Teera" / Hanif "Phudak" Tadap
- Nayab Faiza as herself / Raadha and various characters
- Abubakar Khan/Researcher

== Special episodes ==
- Women Day Special - The episode was aired on 8 March 2021, On the occasion of International Women's Day, Dr. Arooba Tariq hosted the show and special guests appeared including Faisal Sherjan, Javeria Khan, Hina Niazi and Armala Hassan. The show's regular Maira Khan and Ukasha Gul also shared their thoughts on the issue.

== Notable segments ==
Every episode of the show consists of a combination of a subset of the following segments.

=== Subject of Discussion ===
The first and main segment is that in which the anchor person, Mr. Aftab Iqbal, presents a topic of discussion for the show. The actors-comedians either as present themselves as parody-guests or perform a short skit. Sometimes, the guests also include famous personalities, such as, politicians, players and actors.

=== Songs ===
Another segment is that in which an old song is re-performed by singers and musicians present in the show. Some of the singers that have performed on the show are:

- Mughira Ahmad
- Saira Tahir
- Vicky
- Zain
- Bilal Ahmed Mir
- Saima Mumtaz
- Babbu Rana
- Ukasha Gul
- Saqi Khan
- Khalid Baig
- Nish

=== Mini Theatre ===
In this segment, some of the comedians of the show present a short skit. These skits often revolve around the common social evils prevalent in the society. Most famous skits are:

- Khan Brothers: This segment is performed by Honey Albela, Azhar Rangeela and Babbu Rana. These comedians perform as parody singers for various legendary artists from past Including Mehdi Hassan and Pathanay Khan.
- Mosiqar Gharana: The segment opens up in the musicians' house. A Khan Saheb (Babbu Rana) performs the lead vocals of a song. The house is always filled with oddball characters.
- Darbar-e-Sikanadri: A parody version of Alexander the Great (played by Honey Albela) appears in this segment in which he is shown arguing with Aftab Iqbal and other characters present in his court.
- Parlimani Tea Stall: This segment depicts various characters from different levels of society get together to catch up on the latest gossip and news. Tea stall owner is played by Babbu Rana.
- Thana Culture: This skit pokes fun at police department's methods. The convicts try to talk them into accepting the bribe.
- Mughlia Darbar: This segment starts in Mughal court. The characters of Akbar and Nawaz Sharif are merged into one character.

=== Film Kitab Aur Log ===
Another segment is named "Movies, Books and People". In this segment, they present information about some famous movies of the past, the books on the base of which those movies were made and the actors, directors, producers and writers of those movies. Some of the films or books that have been parodied on the show are:

- Spider-Man
- Superman
- The Matrix
- The Terminator
- The Godfather
- Valkyrie
- Bedazzled
- The Mummy
- Titanic
- Maula Jatt
- Sholay
- Gone with the Wind

=== Farhang-e-Asfia ===
In this segment the host, Aftab Iqbal, presents etymology of a couple of words of Urdu, that evolved radically either due to a mistake of an author or mistake of publisher or due to mishearing of listener.

=== Ibn-e-Batuta ===
In this segment the host, Aftab Iqbal discusses famous places of world, that include famous cities, rivers, countries etc.

=== Naseer Bhai's Challenge ===
There was a segment in which the audience used to challenge a person named Naseer Bhai by singing a part of a famous song. But it is no more part of the show after Naseer Bhai's sudden death in June 2016. In that segment, Naseer Bhai had to tell the name of singer of that song, the movie from which it was picked and the name of the music composer of that movie. If Naseer Bhai was unable to recognize the song correctly, then the challenger wins and was presented with a prize. The song could be challenged by both the audience that was present in the studio as well as through telephone. To win the challenge the following conditions must hold:

1. The song should be from an Indian or a Pakistani movie released between 1950 and 1980.
2. The song should be so well known that at least one person in the audience present in the studio, acknowledges to have heard it before.

Throughout the show, the comedians keep interrupting with funny or satirical one-liners.

== Canada tour ==
In November 2016 the Khabardar team toured Canada, which was very much appreciated by Pakistani and Indian communities. They went on to do many indoor shows organised by Pakistani communities during their stays in different cities of Canada. They have also performed different outdoor skits while visiting famous places like parks, historical buildings, and lakes. All those indoor and outdoor skits throughout their tour across the country are recorded and arranged into a "Travelogue" package to be shown to their audience around the world. The first episode was released on air on 21 January 2017 and it is being shown frequently in an episode every week called "Khabardar Canada Special".
