= Daal Chawal =

2019 Pakistani drama film

Daal Chaawal
- Theatrical release Poster
- Directed by: Awais Khalid
- Written by: Akbar Nasir Khan
- Produced by: Akbar Nasir Khan & Syed Asad Ali
- Starring: Momina Iqbal; Ahmed Sufiyan; Salman Shahid; Shafqat Cheema; Sakhawat Naz; Babar Khan; zain mughal; Mehmood Aslam
- Music by: Akbar Nasir Khan
- Distributed by: footprint
- Release date: 4 October 2019
- Country: Pakistan
- Language: Urdu

Daal Chawal is a 2019 Pakistani romantic drama film, directed and produced by Awais Khalid and written by Akbar Nasir Khan. It has Momina Iqbal, Ahmed Sufiyan, Salman Shahid, Shafqat Cheema, Sakhawat Naz and Babar Khan in pivot roles. It released on 4 October 2019, by Hum Films and Eveready Pictures.

== Plot ==
Pakistan police is working against a network of international terrorists in Lahore. Ahmed (Ahmed Sufiyan), a young unemployed man becomes a witness of suicide bombing incident and helps a Police officer Sonia (Momina Iqbal) to apprehend them.

== Cast ==
- Momina Iqbal as Sonia Khan
- Ahmed Sufiyan as Ahmed
- Mir Hamza as Habib
- Shafqat Cheema as Bhola Pehlwan
- Salman Shahid as Khalil Khiali
- Babar Khan Inspector Akram
- Ali Khan as Yousuf
- Sakhawat Naz as Mirza Sahib
- Saima Saleem as Chandni Begum
- Sohail Tariq as professor
- zain mughal as Terrorist
