= Kya Aap Banaingay Crorepati? =

- Logo
- Presented by: Moin Akhtar
- Country of origin: Pakistan

Original release
- Network: ARY Digital
- Release: 2002 – 2004

Kya Aap Banaingay Crorepati? (Urdu: کیا آپ بنیں گے کروڑپتی؟; English translation: Are you going to be a crorepati?) is a Pakistani game show which aired from 2002 to 2004. It was based on the original British format of Who Wants to Be a Millionaire?. The show was hosted by Moin Akhtar. The main goal for the competitors was to win one crore rupees by answering 15 multiple-choice questions correctly. There were three lifelines - Fifty Fifty, Phone A Friend and Ask The Audience. Kya Aap Banaingay Crorepati? was broadcast from 2002 to 2004. It was shown on ARY Digital. The show was bilingual - in English and Urdu. The show was broadcast on every Saturday at 7:45 PST.

== Money tree ==
Question number	Question value
Question number	(Yellow zones are the guaranteed levels)
1	Rs. 1,000/-
2	Rs. 2,000/-
3	Rs. 3,000/-
4	Rs. 5,000/-
5	Rs. 10,000/-
6	Rs. 20,000/-
7	Rs. 40,000/-
8	Rs. 80,000/-
9	Rs. 160,000/-
10	Rs. 320,000/-
11	Rs. 640,000/-
12	Rs. 1,250,000/-
13	Rs. 2,500,000/-
14	Rs. 5,000,000/-
15	Rs. 10,000,000/-
