= Zafar Iqbal (poet) =

Pakistani poet

- ظفر اقبال
- Born: 27 September 1932 (age 94); Bahawalnagar, Punjab, British India
- Occupations: Poet, Writer; Attorney; Journalist
- Relatives: Aftab Iqbal (son); Junaid Iqbal(son)
- Awards: Pride of Performance Award by the President of Pakistan in 1999; Hilal-i-Imtiaz Award by the President of Pakistan in 2014

Zafar Iqbal (Urdu: ظفر اقبال, romanized: Ẓafar Iqbāl; born 27 September 1932) is an Urdu poet from Pakistan.

== Early life and career ==
Zafar was born in 1932 in Bahawalnagar, Punjab where his maternal grandparents lived. He received his early education at his hometown, in Okara, and later moved to Lahore for his college education. His poetry is mainly in the genre of ghazal. The diction of his ghazal is entirely different from traditional Urdu poetry. He is a lawyer by profession, and regularly contributes articles to some Urdu newspapers.

In contrast to classical poets, Zafar's poetry portrays love as scientific and physical rather than supernatural. Dr Tabassam Kaashmiri called him Literature's renegade of the 20th century. Former Chief Minister of Punjab (Pakistan), Hanif Ramay, who was also a writer and a well-known literary critic, called him a poet of a new tone and new concepts.

Besides being a poet, he has been a newspaper columnist for different newspapers for over 35 years. He practised as an attorney, first in Okara and then in Lahore until 2003, when he had a heart bypass surgery and quit practicing law.

== Poetry collections ==
- Tamjid
- Taqweem
- Tashkeel
- Tajawaz
- Tawarid
- Tasahil
- Hay Hanuman
- Ab Tak
- Gul Aftaab
- Tofeeq

== Books ==
- Aab-i-Rawan
- Gulaftab
- Ratb-o-Yabis
- Ghubaaralood simtaun ka suragh
- Sar-i-aam
- Aib-o-hunar
- Vehm-o-gumaan

== Awards and recognition ==
- Hilal-i-Imtiaz Award (Crescent of Excellence Award) by the President of Pakistan in 2014.
- Pride of Performance Award by the President of Pakistan in 1999.
- Kamal-e-Fun Award by the Pakistan Academy of Letters in 2021.
