= Khabarnaak =

- خبرناک
- Genre: Comedy; Satire
- Presented by: Ayesha Jahanb
- Starring: Mir Muhmmad Ali; Seemab Muzaffar; Wajid Khan; Waseem Puno; Nadeem Baral; Hassan Murad; Kokab; Asghar Yazdani; Naeem Baloch; Zeeshan Haider; Rizma; Zunaira Maham
- Composer: Amir Husain
- Country of origin: Pakistan
- Original languages: Urdu; Punjabi
- No. of episodes: 2000+

Production
- Executive producer: Zeeshan Hussain
- Running time: 40-50 minutes

Original release
- Network: GEO News
- Release: September 11, 2010 – April 11, 2021

Khabarnaak (Urdu/Punjabi :خبرناک) is an Urdu and Punjabi comedy television show hosted by Ayesha Jahanzeb alongside Mir Mohammad Ali With Replace Irshad Bhatti Journalist that airs on GEO News.

== Concept ==
The news series, which is styled after TV news talk shows, focuses on the satirical discussion of politics, current affairs, and society's problems, typically in the Punjabi language. Mir Mohammad Ali dresses up as a celebrity and Ayesha Jahanzeb as the presenter and co-host, while several comedians add comments and analysis. It used to feature a section "Zabaan o Bayaan" where the host Ayesha Jahanzaib corrected the wrong use of the Urdu language that is common among the people. Sajjid Bhai would guess the name of the composer, lyricists, and actors by listening to brief sections of past film songs suggested by the host or audience members. Cartoonist Imran Bobby depicts political scenarios through his cartoons.

== Cast ==
=== Main ===
- Aftab Iqbal (Host)
- Seemab Muzaffar (Host)
- Sakhawat Naz as Jeda Driver
- Amanullah as Hakeem Sahab
- Nasir Chinyoti
- Naseem Vicky

=== Recurring ===
- Mir Mohammad Ali as various celebrities' mimic
- Honey Albela as himself
- Saleem Albela as himself
- Iftikhar Thakur
- Sumbul Shahid as herself
- Agha Majid as Aaroo Grenade
- Rubi Anam as Sadak
- Naseer Bhai as himself
- Wajid Khan as himself and various characters
- Goga Ji as himself and various characters
- Farhat Abbas Shah as Master jee
- Sophia Mirza (Co-Host)
- Zainab Jamil (Co-Host)
- Lucky Dear as himself and various characters
- Majid Jahangir
- Abid Farooq as Baghi
- Abid Kashmiri
- Akram Udas
- Ayub Mirza as himself
- Naeem Bokhari (Host)
- Jugnu Mohsin (Host)
- Ayesha Jahanzeb (Host)
- Hassan Murad as himself and various characters
- Waseem Punu as himself and various characters
- Nadeem Baral as himself and various characters
- Imtiaz Kokab
- Asghar Yazdani
- Naeem Baloch
- Sherry Nanha
- Zeeshan Haider
- Rizma
- Zunaira Maham
- Javed Kodu
- Irshad Bhatti (Host)

== Special episodes ==
- Eid Episodes - Usually, on the occasion of Eid al-Fitr, Ali dresses up as Aftab Iqbal and hosts a portion of the show while parodying Aftab. There are also Eid episodes Eid al-Fitr, Eid al-Adha.
- Valentine's Day - Usually, on Valentine's Day, an episode of 2 hours is broadcast live which includes live calls to challenge Naseer Bhai
- New Year's Day celebration - On every new year eve, a special episode is aired on Geo News channel from Aftab Iqbal's farmhouse from Okara.
- Imran Khan special - Chairman Pakistan Tehrik-e-Insaf Imran Khan was interviewed during this episode.
- Imran Khan's former wife Reham Khan appeared on one episode but Geo TV decided not to air this episode.
- 6 September every year (Defence Day) is celebrated in Pakistan and Khabarnaak does a special show for it.
- Pakistan Cricket Team opening batsman, Mohammad Hafeez - Pakistan's star opener Mohammad Hafeez appears as guest in Khabarnaak
- Boxer Aamir Khan - Pakistan famous boxer Aamir Khan appears as a guest in Khabarnaak and is challenged by Bad Weather
- Army Public School attack - Army Public School attack, Peshwar. A Special program by Khabarnaak

Khabarnaak has often done parodies or mimicries of well-known Pakistani public personalities like Sheikh Rasheed Ahmad, Rehman Malik, Tariq Aziz (TV personality), Shahbaz Sharif, Anwar Maqsood and pop artist Ali Azmat.

== History ==
Aftab Iqbal used to host the show Hasb-e-Haal starting in January 2009 – 2010. He left this show in April 2010. Due to his fall out with Hasb-e-Haal producers, Aftab surprised viewers by showing up on GEO TV show Choraha. The first episode of Khabarnaak was aired on 11 September 2010 with Eid celebration on that day. The first episode's cast included popular stage artists like Naseem Vicky, Nasir Chinyoti and Badr Khan along with Amanullah Khan (Hakeem Sahab) and Sakhawat Naz (Jeeda driver). Later, Sakhawat Naz and Amnullah Khan became the regular cast and they were joined by Honey and Saleem Albela in 2011. Iftikhar Thakur joined the show just before the 2013 General Elections.

In another surprise break-up, Amanullah Khan, Sakhawat Naz and Iftikhar Thakur left the show in August 2013 due to undisclosed reasons and started appearing on Dunya TV in the program Mazaaq Raat. Sakhawat Naz and Amanullah Khan were part of the show since its inception. In place of this trio, Agha Majid a.k.a. Aroo Grenade (who had earlier appeared on a few episodes), Rubi Anum (Sadiq), Wajid Khan and Farhat Abbas Shah (Master jee) were added to the regular cast. Lucky Dear, Majid Jehangir, Abid Farooq and Akram Udaas also appear on some shows.

In May 2014, Aftab Iqbal had a falling out with GEO administration and left the show. Parody star Mir Mohammad Ali took over as the host. After a period of 2–3 weeks, Iqbal re-joined Geo News and started hosting the show again.

As of August 2015, Aftab Iqbal left the show (last show aired 25 July 2015). Mir Muhammad Ali hosted the show for a week before Naeem Bokhari was hired as Iqbal's permanent replacement. With Iqbal, cast members Agha Majid, Rubi Anam and Honey Albela also left the show. Iqbal started hosting the show Khabardaar on Express News. They were replaced by Hasan Murad, Sherry Nanna, Saba Gul and Lucky Dear. Majid returned to the show in January 2017.

In 2016, Naeem Bokhari was replaced by Ayesha Jahanzeb as host. Reham Khan, former wife of Imran Khan did one episode but Geo TV management decided not to air this episode. Jugnu Mohsin replaced Jahanzeb in May 2017 for a few episodes after which Jahanzeb returned to host the show.

== Segments of the show ==
- Segment No. 1:- Mir Mohammad Ali appears as a parody of a public figure and does comedy. Sometimes Saleem Albela, Wajid Khan or Hassan Murad also appear as a parody of public figures in Pakistan
- Segment No. 2:- Ayesha Jahanzaib gives very useful advice to the people sitting in the studio and those who are watching the program on TV.
- Segment No. 3:- Song segment. Famous Singer Khalid Baig sings a song with his soulful Voice
- Segment No. 4:- Khabar program Zunaira (Co-Host Khabarnaak) reads the news and the comedians comments/comedy at that news.
