= Bol Kaffara =

Pakistani television drama series

- Also known as: Parlour Wali Larki
- Genre: Social drama Family drama Love Story
- Written by: Fawad Kashif
- Directed by: Nadia Afgan
- Starring: Momina Iqbal; Kiran Haq; Jana Malik
- Country of origin: Pakistan
- Original language: Urdu
- No. of episodes: 77

Production
- Producer: Kashif Kabeer
- Production location: Lahore
- Cinematography: Ali Bodla

Original release
- Network: BOL Entertainment
- Release: 3 December 2018 – 4 May 2019

Bol Kaffara (Urdu: بول کفارہ, lit. 'Give atonement'; alternatively known as Parlour Wali Larki, Urdu: پارلر والی لڑکی, lit. 'The Parlour Girl') is a 2018 Pakistani drama serial which aired on BOL Entertainment. It was directed by Nadia Afgan and written by Fawad Kashif. The drama features Momina Iqbal and was first aired in 2018.

== Plot ==
This story is of an ambitious Sialkot girl Amena who is married to Liaquat and has a son named Ruhan. Liaqut's family are his mother, two married sisters and a younger brother Nasir. Amena's in-laws are greedy who do not give importance to her education; all that matters to them is money, except her brother-in-law Nasir.

Amena's family consists of her father and sister Fatima. She also has an older brother Sajjad, who is married to Shehnaz and has two children. Amena's sister Fatima has one-sided love with Nasir. But Nasir doesn't like her.

Tables turn when Nasir falls in love with a beautiful girl named Mariyum who are living with family at the rented house which belongs to Amena's father. Nasir is seriously in love with Mariyum and so does she but after some time. He sends her mother to Mariyum house to ask for her hand but in greed his mother goes to Fatima's house and ask for her hand without even seeing Mariyum.

This breaks Nasir and Mariyum's heart and they move away due to the worst situation. Nasir leaves the city and goes to Lahore so that he can go to Dubai.

On the other hand, Amena starts an internship at a parlour of Saira. Saira takes the order of client Shareef Sharafat who is a bad guy and took them to do makeup for bar dancers who are performing at a farm house party. There coincidentally Amena see his husband Liaquat who become furious after seeing her. Things get worse between Liaquat and Amena and one day he divorces her.

The prime focus of the story of about the struggles of Amena and Mariyum opening their own Parlour and handling it, and becoming famous as Parlour Wali Larki.

== Cast ==
- Momina Iqbal as Mariyum
- Kiran Haq as Amena
- Jana Malik as Shehnaz
- Zaib Khan as Nasir
- Saiqa as Zohra
- Humaira Ali as Nasir and Liaquat's mother
- Roohi Khan
- Khalid Butt as Nazeer
- Zaria Ahmed as Fatima

== Broadcast ==
The soap was released under title Parlour Wali Larki with half an hour running time 4 days a week, when the channel started its regular transmission in December 2018. However, after airing 77 episodes the show was abruptly ended by the channel in May 2019. Later in 2021, channel launched the show again under the title Bol Kaffara airing an hourly episode on Wednesday.

== Soundtrack ==
"Bol Kaffara"

Song by Sehar Gul Khan & Shehbaz Fayaz Qawwal
- Language: Urdu
- Released: 26 May 2018
- Genre: Pop, Qawwali
- Length: 7:11
- Label: BOL
- Composers: Asim Raza; Soch Band
- Lyricist: Asim Raza
- Producer: BOL

Music video
- Music video on YouTube

Poet Asim Raza recreated Nusrat Fateh Ali Khan's Qawwali "Bol Kaffara" for the soundtrack which was sung by Sehar Gul Khan and Shehbaz Fayaz Qawwal. Bol Kaffara song was filmed at tourist attractions in Kallar Kahar Tehsil (Chakwal District) like Swaik Lake and Katas Raj Temples, by cinematographer Ali Bodla. It is one of the most-viewed Pakistani music videos on YouTube.

In 2021, the song was also covered by Anilka Gill and Zaain ul Abideen in BOL Beats. It was also rendered by Indian singers Neha Kakkar and Jubin Nautiyal.
