= Khalid Abbas Dar =

Pakistani theatre and television comedian

- خالد عباس ڈار
- Born: Khalid Abbas Dar; December 5, 1942 (age 83); Lahore, Punjab, British India
- Occupations: TV Actor, Stage comedian
- Years active: 1955–present
- Awards: Hilal-i-Imtiaz (Crescent of Excellence) Award by the Government of Pakistan in 2013; Sitara-i-Imtiaz (Star of Excellence) Award by the President of Pakistan in 2007; Pride of Performance Award by the President of Pakistan in 1999

Khalid Abbas Dar (born 1942) is an actor, playwright, director, theatre producer, entertainer, mimic, one-man show and television host in Pakistan. His career spans more than six decades.

== Early life and education ==
Dar was born in Lahore, Punjab on 5 December 1942 into a Kashmiri family to Abdul Malik Dar, director of sports at the Islamia College Lahore, who was vehemently opposed to his son's dreams to join the entertainment industry, eventually excluding him from his social circle when he did.

Following his matriculation from Central Model School, he refused to join his father's Islamia College, opting for Government College, Lahore instead, joining as a cricketer and entertainer; after insisting with Muhammad Ajmal, the principal, he remains the only student to be awarded "GC Roll of Honour" for mimicry and one-man show, in 1966.

== Career ==
Khalid Abbas Dar is an entertainer who performs on radio, television, and theater. He is also an actor and a mimic. He has worked for over five and a half decades and today Khalid Abbas Dar is recognized as a well-known entertainer in Pakistan.

His career spans from 1955 to date. From his earliest recordings for Radio Pakistan, he then went onto television.

In 2009, Khalid Abbas Dar was associated with Express News for the political satire and one-man comedy show Darling.

=== Radio ===
Dar started his career as a child performer on Radio Pakistan in 1955. After he continued his career with Radio Pakistan, Lahore, he was known as a well recognised adult voice in dramas and was associated with the popular radio show named Nizam Din daily for 14 years as an extempore companion and alter ego "Mehtab Din".

He was sent by Radio Pakistan, Lahore to the cities and towns to listen to the people's problems and try to resolve those problems highlighted in his radio programme.

=== Television ===
Dar began his work on television in 1964, when the first TV station was inaugurated by president Ayub Khan. He was PTV's first one-man show artist. He later played lead roles in numerous television plays and series.

=== Performing for Pakistan Armed Forces ===
After the ceasefire in the Indo-Pakistani War of 1965, he was asked by the Pakistan Armed Forces authorities, in concert with the All Pakistan Music Conference, to go to the front lines with singers including Mehdi Hassan, Ustad Amanat Ali Khan, Bade Fateh Ali Khan, Masood Rana, Ustad Salamat Ali Khan, Ustad Nazakat Ali Khan, Tufail Niazi, Naseem Begum, Roshan Ara Begum, and Shaukat Ali to entertain the defenders of the country.

== Awards and recognition ==
- Pride of Performance Award by the President of Pakistan in 1999.
- Sitara-i-Imtiaz (Star of Excellence) Award by the President of Pakistan in 2007.
- Hilal-i-Imtiaz (Crescent of Excellence) Award by the President of Pakistan in 2013.
- Roll of Honour 1966 awarded by Government College, Lahore.
- Best Entertainer Award 1987 awarded by PTV.
- Lifetime Achievement Award from Radio Pakistan in 2022.
