= Mir Mohammad Ali =

Pakistani TV comedian

Mir Mohammad Ali PP
- میر محمد علی
- Born: Muzaffarabad, Azad Kashmir, Pakistan
- Other names: Ali Mir, Parody King
- Education: Government College University, Lahore, Pakistan
- Occupation: Actor/comedian
- Years active: 2005–present
- Awards: Pride of Performance Award by the President of Pakistan in 2015

Mir Mohammad Ali (میر محمد علی) also known as Ali Mir (علی میر) is a Pakistani television comedian and impressionist who has appeared in the TV show Khabarnaak and Jashn-e-Cricket (PSL special) on the Geo News channel using humor and satire. He also appeared on 4 Man Show on Aaj TV in 2005.

== Career ==
Geo TV's Khabarnaak comedy show makes fun of prominent political personalities including Nawaz Sharif, Imran Khan, Asif Ali Zardari, Rehman Malik and many others. The show has earned a name for itself by creating awareness among the Pakistani people about many social and political issues by using satire and comedy. Mir Mohammad Ali plays the central character and is widely considered the main highlight of this show.

== Awards and recognition ==
- Pride of Performance Award by the President of Pakistan in 2015.
