= Tariq Teddy =

Pakistani comedian (1976–2022)

- Born: Tariq Teddy; 12 August 1976; Faisalabad, Punjab, Pakistan
- Died: 19 November 2022 (aged 46); Lahore, Punjab, Pakistan
- Occupations: Actor; Comedian
- Years active: 1990–2022
- Children: 3

Comedy career
- Medium: Stand-up; Television
- Genres: Observational comedy; Physical comedy; surreal humor; Character comedy; Satire; Slapstick
- Subjects: Everyday life; Popular culture; Politics; Celebrities

Tariq Teddy (12 August 1976 – 19 November 2022) was a Pakistani theatre comedian in Punjabi, known for his spontaneous, sharp wit.

== Personal life ==
Teddy was born in Faisalabad, Punjab, in 1976, into a family involved in the furniture business.

He had three children, a son and two daughters.

In 2015, his wife Asma filed a case in court because Teddy didn't pay for the children's domestic expenses, leading to his arrest warrants.

== Career ==
Teddy performed in Punjabi stage dramas, beginning in 1990, and also acted in films such as Salakhein.

His comedic persona was a fierce rival of the late fellow comedian Mastana, though the two were close friends off the stage.

== Death ==
Teddy died in Lahore on 19 November 2022, at the age of 46. According to Teddy's son, his father had respiratory and hepatic issues, had been ill for a while, and had spent his last ten days receiving treatment at PKLI Hospital.

== Stage shows ==
- Chalak Tottay 1
- Chalak Tottay 2
- Chalak Tottay 3
- Mama Pakistani
- Sub Say Bara Ruppiya
- Rabba Ishq Na Howay
- Husn Meri Majboori
- Ji Karda
- Do Rangelay
- Beatho Beatho Liya Dala
- Asli Tay Naqli
- Jhoot Bolda
- Mirch Masala
- Ghoonghat Utha Loon
- Eid Da Chan
- Basti Jat Lai
- Abhi To Main Jawan Hun
- Krazy 4
- Mithiyan Sharartan
- Uff Yeh Biwiyan
- Welcome
- Dosti
- Yaro Main Luteya Gaya (2001)

== Film ==
- Salakhain (2004)

== See also ==
- Nasir Chinyoti
- Naseem Vicky
