= Ali Ansari =

Ali Ansari could refer to:

- Ali M. Ansari (born 1967), British historian
- Ali Ansari (actor) (born 1987), Pakistani actor and musician
- Ali Ansari (banker) (born 1962), Iranian businessman and banker

== See also ==
- Ali Al Ansari, Emirati paralympic athlete
