= Momina Iqbal =

Pakistani actress

- Born: Lahore, Pakistan
- Occupations: Actress, Model
- Years active: 2025 – present
- Known for: Parlour Wali Larki; Khuda Aur Muhabbat 3
- Spouses: Moon Cheema (m. 2018; div. 2019) Hamza Habib (m. 2026)
- Relatives: Rimsha Iqbal (Sister); Hammad Butt (brother)

Momina Iqbal (Urdu: مومنہ اقبال) is a Pakistani television actress. She made her acting debut in 2018 with Parlour Wali Larki as the female protagonist Maryam. She later appeared in serials like Khuda Aur Muhabbat 3, Ishq Mein Kaafir, Ajnabi Lage Zindagi and Ehd-e-Wafa. In 2019, she made her film debut with Daal Chawal as Sonia.

== Career ==
Momina Iqbal start her acting career in 2018 with the daily soap Parlour Wali Larki as Maryam.

In 2019, Momina made her film debut with Daal Chawal.

She was also seen in serials such as Khuda Aur Mohabbat 3, Ishq Mein Kaafir, Ehd E Wafa, and Dastak in supporting roles and in Do Kinarey in a lead role.

== Filmography ==
=== Film ===
| Year | Title | Role | Notes |
|---|---|---|---|
| 2019 | Daal Chawal | Sonia Khan | Debut film |

=== Short film ===
| Year | Title | Role | Network |
|---|---|---|---|
| 2020 | Haye Jana Tera Ghum | Sara | Pocket Films |

=== Television ===
| Year | Title | Role | Notes |
|---|---|---|---|
| 2018 | Parlour Wali Larki | Maryam | TV debut |
| 2019 | Ajnabi Lage Zindagi | Tabeer | Lead role |
| 2019 | Ishq Mein Kaafir | Dua | Support role |
| 2019–2020 | Ehd-e-Wafa | Masooma | Support role |
| 2020 | Sitara | | Lead role |
| 2020–2021 | Bhool Jaa Ay Dil | Sofia | Support role |
| 2021 | Khuda Aur Muhabbat 3 | Naheed | Support role |
| 2021 | Laapata | Aliya | Support role |
| 2021 | Sila-e-Mohabbat | Rania | Support role |
| 2022 | Meray Humnasheen | Shanzey | Parallel lead role |
| 2022 | Saaya 2 | Gurriya | Support role |
| 2022 | Milan | Maira | Lead role |
| 2023 | Grift | Roohi | Lead role |
| 2023 | Samjhota | Mehreen | Lead role |
| 2023 | Ehsaan Faramosh | Falak | Lead role |
| 2024 | Ghaata | Rania | Lead role |
| 2024 | Teray Janay Kay Baad | Sajal | Lead role |
| 2024–2025 | Tauba | Anmol | Lead role |
| 2025 | Dastak | Faryal | Support Role |
| 2025–present | Do Kinaray | Dureshehwar | Lead Role |
| 2026–present | Jahannum Ba'raasta Jannat | Zarqa | Lead Role |
| 2026–present | Muhafiz | Paras | |
| 2026 Present | Nizaam | | |

=== Anthology series ===
| Year | Title | Role | Network | Notes |
|---|---|---|---|---|
| 2021 | Dikhawa | Faiza | Geo Entertainment | Episode Khara Khota |

=== Music video ===
| Year | Title | Singer |
|---|---|---|
| 2021 | Qadar Jani Na | Sarmad Qadeer |
