= Mukarram Bukhari =

Pakistani-Canadian actor

Mukarram
- Born: Mukarram Bukhari
- Occupation: Actor
- Years active: 1983 - present
- Website: http://glamourinn.webs.com/

Mukarram Bukhari (Urdu: مکرم) in Lahore, Pakistan, often credited as Mukarram, is a Pakistani/Canadian actor currently living in Toronto, Ontario, Canada. He has worked in four movies and more than 200 TV shows.

== Actor ==
Year	Movie	Role	Type	Other notes
1990	Barood Ka Toofa	Arman	Film	
1991	Betaab	Imran	Film	
1992	Qurbani	Arman	Film	
1996	International Hassena		Film	
1998	Film		TV	
1999	Rang Aur Rakh		TV	
2002	"Taang"		TV Series	
2002	Dasht-E-Tanhaee		TV	
2002	"Chashman"	Jamal	TV series	
2010	Jheel Kinare	Sagar	TV (Canada)	
