= Muhammad Ajmal =

- Born: 7 September 1919; Ludhiana, British India, Present-day India
- Died: 1994 (aged 74–75); Islamabad, Pakistan
- Education: Government College, Lahore, Pakistan; University College, London, UK
- Known for: Establishing Psychology in Pakistan
- Scientific career
- Fields: psychology
- Workplaces: Government College, Lahore; Quaid-i-Azam University; Federal Public Service Commission
- Doctoral advisor: Michael Fordham; J. C. Flugel; Gerhard Adler

Makhdum Muhammad Ajmal (7 September 1919, Ludhiana, India – 1994) was an academic psychologist who established the first university psychology department in Pakistan. The psychologist Muhammad Asir Ajmal, who later served as head of the psychology department in Government College University Lahore, is his son.

== Early life and education ==
Ajmal was the son of Masooda Begum Chishtie, from the scholarly Chishtie family of Lahore, and Khan Bahadur Makhdum Mohammad Afzal, district and sessions judge. He was a year younger than his elder sister, Sarwai Begum (later Mrs Sarwari Chishtie). After his parents separated, Ajmal lived with his mother in Koocha Chabak Sawaranin the walled city of Lahore. His mother was a teacher and later headmistress of Mission Girls High School, Rung Mahal, Lahore. After matriculation Ajmal joined Government College, Lahore, the premier educational institution. He married Syeda Akhtar Sultana (d. 1999).

== Studying in United Kingdom ==
In the early years he was posted to various far off places in (pre-independence) India, later taught at Campbellpur (now Attock) and then his alma mater, Government College, Lahore.He went to England to do his PhD in psychology, which he completed at University College, London. Amongst his supervisors & teachers were Professors Michael Fordham, J. C. Flugel and in particular, Gerhard Adler. He trained in Freudian and Jungian psychoanalysis, while working part-time for the BBC. His PhD thesis is titled 'Comparison of Jungian and Freudian Analysis'. He wrote numerous plays for the BBC Urdu service and interviewed the famous A. S. Neill of Summerhill School.

== Establishing Psychology Department in Pakistan ==
After returning from England, he was appointed lecturer in psychology in the department of Philosophy at Government College. Psychology was not recognised or established as a separate subject. He helped establish psychology in Pakistan, starting with the Government College Lahore. A separate psychology department was established and he became its first head and professor. He established the first counselling center in Pakistan, in his department and established the Lahore Mental Health Society. He was the driving force in establishing National Institute of Psychology, in Islamabad, which was posthumously named after him as Dr. Mohammad Ajmal National Institute of Psychology.

== Role in psychological warfare ==
He helped establish the psychological warfare department in the armed forces, was appointed full-time adviser/psychologist to the Bureau of National Reconstruction in the 1960s. In the 1970s he became Principal, Government College, something he dreamed of becoming just before his retirement, but was also appointed Director of Education and later became Vice chancellor, University of the Punjab, Lahore. In 1973, he became Secretary of Education, Pakistan. After retirement he was became a member of the FPSC (Federal Public Service Commission)to reform senior civil services in Pakistan and later appointed its acting chairman.

== Legacy ==
He established the Center of Excellence, The National Institute of Psychology at Quaid-i-Azam University. After his death the Government of Pakistan named it the "Dr. Ajmal National Institute of Psychology.

== Books ==
- Tehlili Nafsiyaat (Analytical Psychology)
- Muqaalaat-i-Ajmal (edited by Sheema Majeed)
- Everyday Psychology
- Nishat-i-falsafa (Translation of "Pleasures of Philosophy" by Will Durant)
- Suqraat (Socrates).
