= Chak Ramdas =

- Village
- Location in Pakistan
- Coordinates: 32°5′33.9″N 74°24′29.6″E
- Country: Pakistan
- Province: Punjab
- District: Sargodha

Population
  - Total: 9,249

Chak Ramdas is a village in Bhalwal Tehsil, Sargodha District, Punjab, Pakistan. According to the 2017 census, it has a population of 9,249.

== Gurdwara Sri Guru Arjan Sahib ==
Gurdwara Sri Guru Arjan Sahib Chak Ram Das was located in Chak Ramdas, on the Eminabad–Mianwali Bungalow road about 20 km east of Eminabad. The site commemorated Guru Arjan Dev's visit, who was particularly drawn here by his devotee, Bhai Prana. In honour of the Guru's stay, a spacious gurdwara and an adjoining chaubara, locally known as the "Guru Da Mehal" (Guru's Palace), were erected by the Sikh authorities.

Under the Sikh Empire, the Gurdwara was endowed with forty ghumaon of agricultural land, exempt from all revenue collection, to sustain its upkeep and community services. Following the Partition of British India in 1947, communal violence and mass migrations led the local Sikh sangat to cross into Indian Punjab and Muslims from the other side to Pakistani Punjab for safety. With its congregation gone and no local caretaker body, the gurdwara buildings gradually fell into ruin. Today, only fragments of its brickwork remain, and the original land grant is administered by the Auqaf Department of Pakistan, although no revenues are currently collected from it.
