= Shahid Mahmood (artist) =

Canadian architect and cartoonist

Shahid Mahmood is a Canadian architect and cartoonist of Pakistani descent.

== Early life ==
Shahid was born in Toronto, Canada and spent his childhood and teenage years in Pakistan, attending schools in Lahore and Karachi. Early in his career, he drew political cartoons for the Pakistani publications Star, Dawn and Newsline Magazine. After graduation he studied architecture in Canada, attending both Carleton and McGill University (Master of Architecture, McGill University; Bachelor of Architecture, Carleton University). Shahid’s cartoons focus largely on religion and politics, with his critiques targeting both Islamic fundamentalism and the aggressiveness of US foreign policy. Over the years, he has received threats to his well-being from groups ranging from the Taliban to various government officials.

== Career ==
His cartoons were a part of the exhibition showing at the 1997 APEC Conference. Following the 9/11 Attacks, Shahid exhibited work at the Paris exhibition The New World Order. In 2002 his exhibition Enduring Operation Freedom, criticizing the Bush policies in Afghanistan, resulted in the McMaster Museum of Art in Canada shutting down the event. While working in Pakistan, Shahid faced repeated attempts at censorship by the government of Prime Minister Benazir Bhutto, who was featured in several of Shahid’s works. His cartoons have been preserved in various institutions including the Museum of Contemporary History in Paris. He has published his work in publications including The Huffington Post, The Guardian, The Express Tribune, Courrier International, and The New York Times Press Syndicate. Shahid has commented on the Charlie Hebdo aftermath.

== Censorship ==
Shahid is mentioned as being one of the first Canadians to be flagged on the US No Fly List. The Canadian Parliament debated his story, and in an open letter released by Amnesty International in December 2007 Shahid’s case was cited as a prime reason to implement the recommendations made by the Arar Commission that advocate for balanced and transparent security measures in Canada. Shahid claims that his criticisms of US foreign policy and military interventionism resulted in him being denied boarding to a domestic Air Canada flight in 2004. Following this, he began to receive extra screening on a routine basis by airlines in many countries. In 2009 a racial profiling complaint regarding the incident was argued in front of the Canadian Human Rights Tribunal. In 2010 Shahid settled the case with Air Canada. The short documentary, “Listed” narrates some of the details of this incident. In 2012 Shahid was again detained in the Santiago International Airport and interviewed by Interpol for 90 minutes, indicating he was still on a US government security list. He was later assigned a specialized PIN from US Homeland Security to help deal with the appearance of his name on security lists. Shahid has also received threats from Islamic fundamentalists for his works criticizing fundamentalism, including an image of the Taliban depicted as an ape reading an upside-down Qur’an. He has written and spoken over the years on issues related to satire and censorship in newsprint, radio, and television.
