= Loose Talk (Pakistani TV series) =

2002 Pakistani television show

- Genre: Satire; Comedy
- Created by: Anwar Maqsood
- Written by: Anwar Maqsood
- Directed by: Asad Baig; Shoaib Hokla
- Starring: Moin Akhter; Anwar Maqsood
- Country of origin: Pakistan
- Original language: Urdu
- No. of seasons: 2
- No. of episodes: 419

Production
- Camera setup: Multi-camera setup
- Running time: 15-20 minutes

Original release
- Network: ARY Digital Network
- Release: 2002 – 2008

Loose Talk (Urdu: لُوز ٹاک) was a Pakistani television comedy show that was first aired on ARY Digital in June 2002. The show was a social and political commentary delivered humorously to reach the masses. It was written and created by Anwar Maqsood and featured impressionist Moin Akhter. The satire-comedy talk show was loosely inspired by BBC World Service's HARDTalk.

In November 2019, a clip of Akhter from the show led to the resurgence of the show's popularity in India and Pakistan.

== Format ==
Each episode featured Anwar Maqsood as the host and Moin Akhter as a guest impersonating hundreds of different personalities including Saddam Hussein (episode 26), Abdul Sattar Edhi (episode 276), former Prime Minister of India Manmohan Singh (episode 298), Sushma Swaraj, Javed Miandad, a harmonium player, a Christian nurse, a transgender woman, and a single mother. Bushra Ansari also starred in several episodes.

== Reception ==
The show was immensely popular in Pakistan when it first aired. The then President Pervez Musharraf admitted to being a fan.

In November 2019, an extract from an episode in which Moin Akhter impersonates a harmonium player and exchanges humorous barbs with Anwer Maqsood went viral in South Asia. The short clip led to the creation of a popular meme template featuring Moin Akhter himself. The full episode on the official YouTube channel of Loose Talk has amassed more than 46 million views (as of May 2025), the majority of which accrued in late 2019 when the show's popularity exploded in India and Pakistan.

In February 2020, Indian food delivery start-up Zomato used the internet meme to mock its own marketing campaign.

=== Awards ===
Year	Award	Category	Recipient	Result	Ref(s).
2010	Pakistan Media Awards	Best Comedy Program	Loose Talk	Won	
