= Sakhawat Naz =

Pakistani actor and comedian

- Born: Faisalabad, Punjab, Pakistan
- Occupations: Actor; TV comedian
- Relatives: Sajan Abbas (brother)
- Notable work: Khabarnaak; Mazaaq Raat

Comedy career
- Medium: Stand-up, television, film
- Genres: Improvisational comedy; musical comedy; physical comedy; satire
- Subjects: Everyday life; Pakistani culture; popular culture

Sakhawat Naz (Punjabi: ﺳﺨﺎﻭﺕ ﻧﺎﺯ) is a Pakistani stand-up comedian and actor from Faisalabad, Punjab, Pakistan. He is best known for his work in Pakistani theatre. Naz's television work includes appearances in comedy shows Khabarnaak and Mazaaq Raat. He is often considered one of the most popular comedians of Lahore Theater.

== Early life ==
Sakhawat Naz was born in Faisalabad, Punjab, Pakistan.

== Career ==
=== Theatre ===
He started his career from Faisalabad at age 12. He has had major roles in a dozen classic plays at Theatre of Pakistan also known locally as 'stage dramas'.

=== Television ===
In 2010, he joined Khabarnaak, a GEO TV comedy satire show. He appeared on the show as Jeda. In 2013, Naz left the show and started a similar program on Dunya News called Mazaaq Raat. He began playing Pappu All-rounder, an unemployed young man with multiple skills.

=== Film ===
In 2019, he played a supporting role in film Daal Chawal (2019).

== Personal life ==
He is married and has two children. His brother is stage actor Sajan Abbas. His family business is selling home-paint.

== Filmography ==
=== Films ===
Year	Title	Role	Notes
2001	Asoo Billa	Ustad G	
2002	Kalu Shah Puriya	Naukar	
2009	Gujjar Badshah	Zulfi	
2015	Sohna Gujjar	Talwar Baloch	
2019	Daal Chawal	Mirza Sahib	
2022	Golgappo 2022	Hero	

=== Television ===
Year	Title	Role	Notes
1998	Rahain		
2008	Choki no. 420	jamil	Guest appearance
2010–13	Khabarnaak	Jeda Driver	
2013–16	Mazaaq Raat		
2019	Syasi Theater		
2019	Har Lamha Purjosh	Jeda Driver	
2020	Gair Siyasi Theater		
2021	Zabardast	Various characters	
2023–present	Mazaaq Raat	Himself / Pappu All-rounder	

=== Theatre ===
- Unknown year : Feeqa In America
