= Aftab Iqbal =

Pakistani journalist and businessman (born 1958)

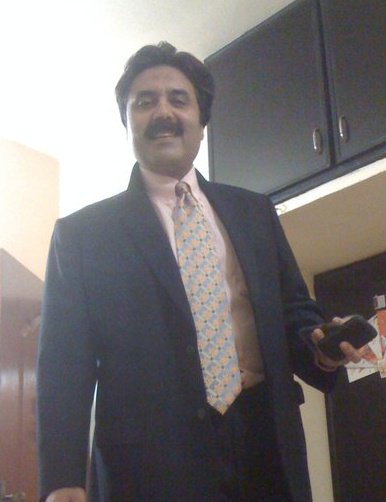
- Born: 19 September 1958 (age 68); Okara, Punjab, Pakistan
- Education: Government College University
- Occupations: Anchor; Television host; Journalist; Director
- Years active: 1986 – present
- Parent: Zafar Iqbal (father)

YouTube information
- Channel: Aftab Iqbal
- Years active: 2017-present
- Subscribers: 2.05 million
- Views: 844.4 million
- Last updated: 4 April 2025
- Website: www.aftabiqbal.com

Aftab Iqbal (born 19 September 1958) is a Pakistani television host, journalist and businessman who founded an international Pakistani news channel, Aap Media Group. He is a former host of TV programs Hasb-e-Haal on Dunya News (2009–2010), Khabarnaak on Geo News (2010–2015), Khabardaar on Express News (2015–2018), Himaqatain (2018–2019) on 92 News, Khabarzar on Aap News (2019–2020), Khabaryar on Neo News (2020–2021), Khabardaar Season 2 on Express News (2021–2022) and Khabarhar on Samaa TV News (2022–2023). Since 2024, He is doing Khabarhar Season 2 on Web Digital Platforms.

His presence on digital media is through his YouTube channel Aftab Iqbal started on 7 January 2017. In October 2018, he launched his TV Channel Aap News, where he fulfilled administrative affairs. In January 2020, he left the channel and joined Neo News. He left Neo News in January 2021 and returned to Express News and hosted the show Khabardar on Express News, which he in turn left to start Khabarhaar on Samaa TV in 2022. In 2024, after a one-year break, he revived Khabarhar as "Khabarhar Season 2" which quickly grabbed the attention of the viewers. He digitally connected with his team in Lahore studio to record the show while himself, co-host Dr. Arooba, Researcher Shakeel Chaudhary and other members of his team remained in the UAE. He also introduced digital shows Open Mic Cafe, Amaniyat, Dialogue With History and Chacha Boota on his YouTube channel Aftab Iqbal.

== Early life and education ==
Aftab Iqbal was born on 9 September 1958 in a prominent Punjabi Mian Arain family of 49/3.r Okara.

He is the son of Urdu poet and newspaper columnist Zafar Iqbal.

He received his master's degree from Government College University (Lahore) in 1985 and also got a diploma in History of Mass Communications from San Jose State University in California in 1986.

== Career ==
He worked as a reporter from 1986 to 1987 and held some positions in the private sector companies of Pakistan. Then he briefly worked as a 'Media Advisor' to Chief Minister of Punjab (Pakistan) from 1994 to 1995. He wrote a column titled "Aaftabian" in Nawa-i-Waqt newspaper from 1995 to 2010.

Many people in Pakistan give him credit for playing a key role in boosting the viewership and TV ratings at three Pakistani TV channels.

He also wrote the program's script and as a host of the show, tried to keep it focused more on the political comedy and satire rather than letting it wander aimlessly. The crew and cast of Khabarnaak used to do parodies or mimicries of Pakistan's known politicians like Sheikh Rasheed Ahmad, Rehman Malik, Shahbaz Sharif, famous writer Anwar Maqsood, Pakistani TV personality Tariq Aziz and pop music artist Ali Azmat among many others. Aftab Iqbal used to include a short educational segment in this program, called Zabaan-o-Bayaan in which he used to point out language pronunciation errors made by the common public.

== Filmography ==
=== Reality shows ===
Year	Show	Role	Notes
2008–2010	Hasb-e-Haal	Host/presenter	
2010–2015	Khabarnaak	Host/presenter	
2015–2018	Khabardaar	Host/presenter	
2018–2020	Khabarzar	Host/presenter	
2020–2021	Khabaryar	Host/presenter	
2021–2022	Khabardaar	Host/presenter	
2022–2023	Khabarhar	Host/presenter	
2024-present	Khabarhar	Host/presenter	

=== Web shows ===
Year	Show	Role	Notes
2021–present	Mailbox with Aftab Iqbal	Permanent guest	
2020–present	Open Mic Cafe	Permanent guest	
2021–2022	Saray Rung Punjab Day	Permanent guest	
