= Daily Express (Urdu newspaper) =

Urdu-language Pakistani news publication

Daily Express روزنامہ ایکسپریس
- Type: Daily newspaper
- Format: Broadsheet
- Owner: Lakson Group
- Publisher: Century Publications
- Founded: 3 September 1998
- Language: Urdu
- Headquarters: Karachi, Pakistan
- Sister newspapers: The Express Tribune
- Website: express.com.pk

The Daily Express (Urdu: روزنامہ ایکسپریس) is a Pakistani Urdu-language newspaper owned by Lakson Group.

It is published simultaneously from Islamabad, Karachi, Lahore, Peshawar, Quetta, Multan, Faisalabad, Gujranwala, Sargodha, Rahim Yar Khan and Sukkar.

== History ==
Lakson Group launched Daily Express in 1998 with a novel approach to newspaper distribution in Pakistan, headquartered in Lahore instead of the conventional hub, Karachi. This decision was underpinned by an assertion that Punjab province, with Lahore as its capital, housed more Urdu newspaper readers than Karachi. This hypothesis proved accurate as the Daily Express quickly amassed a receptive readership in the region.

The publication's innovative approach continued with the decision to distribute not only from major metropolitan areas such as Karachi, Lahore, Rawalpindi, and Islamabad, but also from secondary cities in Punjab, including Multan, Sargodha, Gujranwala, Faisalabad, and Rahim Yar Khan. This move resonated with readers in these areas who favored locally focused news over content from more remote cities.

The Daily Express also adopted a strategy of offering competitive salaries to columnists with substantial established readerships. As a result, many influential columnists transitioned from established newspapers such as Daily Jang and Nawa-i-Waqt, bringing their loyal readers along with them.

The timing of the Daily Express's launch was fortuitous, aligning with a dispute between the Jang Group, Pakistan's oldest and largest newspaper group, and then Prime Minister Nawaz Sharif's government in the late 1990s. This led to financial and other constraints on the Daily Jang, which, in turn, provided an opening for the Daily Express to gain substantial readership, particularly in Punjab.

== Editorial policy ==
The Daily Express's editorial policy is marked by a centrist, market-friendly approach, blending entertainment with current affairs. It holds a conservative political and social standpoint and an accommodating perspective towards security and intelligence agencies. These elements occasionally lead to internal censorship of content in both the Daily Express and its sister publication, The Express Tribune, under the direct oversight of Sultan Ali Lakhani. This measure is taken to avoid conflicts with the powers-that-be and the religious establishment.

== See also ==
- Express News, TV news channel started by Lakson Group
