= Lakson Group =

Pakistani corporate

- Type: Corporate group
- Founded: 1954; 72 years ago
- Founder: Sultan Ali Lakhani; Iqbal Ali Lakhani
- Headquarters: Karachi, Sindh, Pakistan,
- Area served: Pakistan
- Key people: Iqbal Ali Lakhani (chairman)
- Website: lakson.com.pk

The Lakson Group (Urdu pronunciation: [ˈlæk.sən] LAK-sən) is a group of companies headquartered in Karachi, Sindh, Pakistan.

== History ==
It was founded in 1954 and is owned by the Lakhani family.

== Subsidiaries ==
=== Listed ===
- Century Insurance Company Limited, general insurance business
- Century Paper and Board Mills Limited, producer of packaging boards
- Colgate-Palmolive Pakistan, manufacture and sale of detergents, personal care, and other related products in Pakistan
- Merit Packaging Limited, active in printing and packaging

=== Unlisted ===
- Century Publications, incorporated in 1998, publishes Urdu and Sindhi daily newspapers Express and Daily Sindh Express
  - Express News, Urdu-language TV news channel
  - Express 24/7, English- 24-hours TV news channel (now closed down)
  - Express Entertainment, Urdu-language Entertainment channel
  - The Daily Express, Urdu daily in Pakistan
  - The Express Tribune, English-language newspaper
- Cybernet, internet, and data communication network service provider
  - StormFiber, Internet, and television service provider
- Sybrid, business process outsourcing
  - Ice Animations, VFX, and animation
- NayaPay, digital wallet and payment system.
- Lakson Investments Limited, independent asset manager
- McDonald's Pakistan
- Ajinomoto Lakson Pakistan, produces seasonings, cooking oils, TV dinners, sweeteners, amino acids, and pharmaceuticals
- Princeton Travels (Private) Limited, an IATA accredited travel agency and an active member of International travel forums like ASTA, PATA, UFTAA & TAAP
- Fly Jinnah, a joint venture between Lakson Group and Air Arabia. It adopts the low cost model similar to that of Air Arabia.

=== Former subsidiaries ===
- Clover Pakistan, formerly distributed Tang, Toblerone, Philadelphia Cream Cheese, and Titan watches in Pakistan
- Tetley Clover
- Lakson Tobacco

== See also ==
- List of companies of Pakistan
