= Moin Akhter =

Pakistani comedian (1950–2011)

Moin Akhter معین اختر SI PP
- معین اختر
- Born: 24 December 1950; Karachi, Federal Capital Territory, Pakistan
- Died: 22 April 2011 (aged 60); Karachi, Sindh, Pakistan
- Occupations: Comedian; Host; Writer; Singer; Director; Producer
- Years active: 1966–2011
- Children: 3 sons ; 2 daughters
- Awards: Pride of Performance (1996); Sitara-e-Imtiaz (2011)

Pride of Performance Award Recipient
- Date: 14 August 1996
- Country: Pakistan
- Presented by: Prime Minister Benazir Bhutto

Moin Akhter (Urdu: معین اختر; 24 December 1950 – 22 April 2011) was a Pakistani television, film and stage artist, humorist, comedian, impersonator, host, writer, singer, director and producer who rose to fame in the era of Radio Pakistan along with his co-actors Anwar Maqsood and Bushra Ansari. He became an icon through his screen persona Rozi and is considered to be a one-of-a-kind parodist and the king of Urdu comedy. His career spanned more than 45 years, from childhood in the Radio Pakistan era to work of great renown on television, film and stage until a year before his death in 2011.

== Early life ==
Akhter was born in Karachi, Pakistan on 24 December 1950.

His father Muhammad Ibrahim Mehboob, who died at the age of 92, a few months following Akhter's death, was born in Muradabad (in modern-day Uttar Pradesh, India) and, following the 1947 partition, settled in Karachi, where he "passed his life in his own printing press and as a contractor in the garments business."

Akhter was fluent in several languages, including English, Bengali, Sindhi, Punjabi, Memoni, Pashto, Gujarati apart from his native Urdu.

Before joining the performing arts, Akhter worked as a mechanic.

== Career ==
=== Early career ===
Akhter started his acting career as a child actor at the age of 13. He played the character of Shylock in Shakespeare's The Merchant of Venice in theatre.

Akhter's sense of humour was highly dynamic and versatile. He made his television debut on 6 September 1966, in a variety show on Pakistan Television (PTV) to celebrate the first Defence Day of Pakistan. He started as a comedian in 1966 by impersonating the Hollywood actor Anthony Quinn and mimicked a speech of the former USA's president John F Kennedy. He has performed several roles in television and stage shows, later teaming up with Anwar Maqsood and Bushra Ansari.

=== Television ===
Akhter acted in several films, sitcoms and dramas, and hosted many TV talk shows, including:

| Television | Title | Genre |
|---|---|---|
| PTV | Rozi | Telefilm |
| PTV | Eid Train | Theatrical film |
| PTV | Studio Dhai | Sketches |
| PTV | Studio Pony Teen | Sketches |
| NTM | Studio Char Bees | Sketches |
| PTV | Show Time | TV drama |
| PTV | Show Sha | TV drama |
| PTV | Yes Sir No Sir | Talk show |
| PTV | Apka Anwer Maqsood | Stage show |
| PTV | Moin Akhter Show | Talk show |
| PTV | Such Much | Sitcom |
| ARY Digital | Loose Talk | Talk show |
| PTV | Half Plate | TV show |
| PTV | Family-93 | TV show |
| PTV | Fifty Fifty | Sketch comedy |
| TV One | Mirza Aur Hameeda | TV drama |
| PTV | Hello Hello | TV show |
| PTV | Intezar Farmaye | TV show |
| PTV | Dollar Man | TV show |
| PTV | Makan No 47 | TV drama |
| PTV | Bandar Road Sey Kemari | TV drama |
| PTV | Aangan Terha | Sitcom |
| PTV | Baby | TV drama |
| PTV | Rafta Rafta | TV drama |
| PTV | Guum | TV drama |
| TV One | Hariyale Banney | TV drama |
| Geo Tv | Kuch Kuch Such Much | Sitcom |
| Geo Tv | Such Much Ki Eid | Sitcom telefilm |
| Geo Tv | Such Much Ka Election | Sitcom telefilm |
| ARY Digital | Kya Aap Banaingay Crorepati? | Game show |
| NTM | Nokar Key Agey Chaaker | TV drama |
| PTV | Choun Chan Ahoo | TV drama |
| PTV | Kia Bane Baat | TV drama |
| PTV | Bakra Qiston Pe | TV comedy show |

==== Rozi ====
Akhter rose to the national spotlight and gathered critical acclaim for his performance in the drama Rozi (1990) in which he played the role of a female TV artist. Rozi was an Urdu adaptation of the Hollywood movie Tootsie starring Dustin Hoffman. He called it one of his favourite on-screen characters that he had played. Rozi was written by Imran Aslam and directed by Saira Kazmi.

==== Talk shows ====
In the talk-show Loose Talk, which began in 2002 on ARY Digital, he appeared as a different character in each episode with a total of over 400 episodes interviewed by the TV host Anwar Maqsood, who was also the writer of the programme. Akhter also briefly hosted the game show Kya Aap Banaingay Crorepati?, the Pakistani version of Who Wants to Be a Millionaire?. He hosted shows involving major personalities and performed on stage alongside Indian legends including Dilip Kumar, Lata Mangeshkar and Madhuri Dixit.

=== Host ===
He hosted shows with invited dignitaries including King Husain of Jordan, Prime Minister of Gambia Dawoodi Al-Joza, Presidents Zia-ul-Haq, Ghulam Ishaq Khan, General Yahya Khan and Pervez Musharraf (Akhter mimicked the president in his presence), Prime Minister Zulfiqar Ali Bhutto and the legendary Indian film actor Dilip Kumar.

=== Films ===
Akhter made his film debut with Tum Sa Nahi Dekha (1974) and had lead roles in movies such as Mr. Tabedar (1993) and Mr. K-2 (1995), which didn't do well at the box-office, whereas Raaz (1992), where he had a supporting role, did well. Actor Mustafa Qureshi has argued that, unlike most comedians, Akhter never aimed for a film career as his brand of comedy was different from that shown in the movies back then.

=== Music ===
Akhter was also a singer, having released an album where he reprised the classical songs of his life long friend Ahmed Rushdi.

==== Album – Tera Dil Bhi Yun Hi Tadpe ====
- Chhorr Ke Jaane Wale
- Choat Jigar Pe Khai Hai
- Ro-Ro Ke De Raha Hai
- Tera Dil Bhi Yun Hi Tadpe
- Dard Hi Sirf Dil Ko Mila
- Dil Ro Raha Hai
- Hoten Hai Bewafa

== Death and legacy ==
Akhter died on 22 April 2011 at about 4:30 pm in Karachi after suffering a heart attack. He was survived by his wife, three daughters and two sons. Funeral prayers for Akhter were offered in Tauheed Masjid near his residence. Thousands of people attended the funeral prayer which was led by Junaid Jamshed. Many Bollywood actors paid tribute to Akhter including Johnny Lever, Javed Akhtar, Javed Jaffrey and Shatrughan Sinha. Sinha was an old admirer of Akhter, even becoming a supplier of his audio cassettes in Mumbai.

Madame Tussauds has expressed a wish to include a waxwork of Moin Akhter in its London museum. If the statue is made, it will be the first for any Pakistani entertainer at Madame Tussauds.

== Autobiography ==
One Man Show (Urdu: ون مین شو) is an autobiographical Urdu book mostly written by Akhter himself before his death in 2011. The book was posthumously completed and published in 2025 by Oxford University Press. It chronicles his life and career, from his early stage performances to his acclaimed television and film roles, and includes personal reflections, rare photographs, and tributes from colleagues and family members. The book features a preface by his longtime collaborator Anwar Maqsood and a foreword by Zia Mohyeddin.

== Awards and nominations ==
- Pride of Performance, awarded in 1996 by the Government of Pakistan.
- Honorary Citizenship of Dallas (Texas, United States) in 1996 for his achievements.
- Special Award for Comedy in The 1st Indus Drama Awards 2005.
- In 2000 he won Best Actor Award at PTV Awards.
- Sitara-i-Imtiaz, awarded in 2011 by the Government of Pakistan.

== See also ==
- List of Pakistani male actors
