= Sohail Ahmed =

Pakistani comedian and actor

Sohail Ahmed PP SI
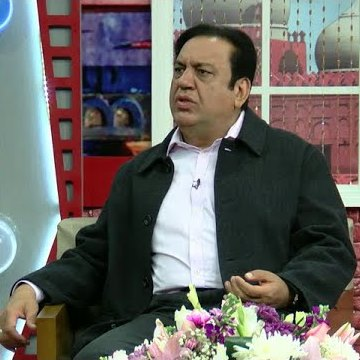
- Sohail Ahmed in 2019
- Born: 1 May 1963 (age 63); Gujranwala, Punjab, Pakistan
- Other name: Azizi
- Notable work: The character of Azizi in the Hasb-e-Haal comedy show since 2009
- Children: Hamza Sohail (son)

Comedy career
- Medium: Actor; Comedian; Director
- Genre: Satire
- Subjects: Pakistani culture; Punjabi culture; Current events

Pride of Performance Award Recipient
- Date: 23 March 2011
- Country: Islamic Republic of Pakistan
- Presented by: Asif Ali Zardari (President of Pakistan)

Sohail Ahmed (Punjabi: سہیل احمد) (born 1 May 1963), also known as Azizi (Urdu: عزیزی), is a Pakistani actor, comedian and director.

He appears in television serials, movies and comedy stage plays principally based in Lahore.

Sohail Ahmed is best known to the wider public for his character of Azizi in the Dunya TV comedy show Hasb-e-Haal, where he has been active since 2009. He developed the character in collaboration with his co-anchor Aftab Iqbal when Hasb-e-Haal started on Dunya News.

== Early and personal life ==
Sohail Ahmed was born in Gujranwala, Punjab, on 1 May 1963.

His maternal grandfather Faqir Muhammad Faqir (1900–1974) was a philanthropist as well a writer, having authored more than 40 books in Punjabi, while his father Mian Muhammad Akram was a DSP in Gujranwala. He has three brothers: Javed, a journalist and poet, and Aurangzeb and Junaid, both teachers. His brother Junaid Akram is a published author of Punjabi literature.

His son Hamza Sohail, an MBA from London, is also an actor, who made his debut in 2021 with Hum TV's Raqeeb Se.

== Career ==
As a stage actor, Sohail is known for his improvisation skills, preferring to use spontaneous or impromptu dialogues during comedy shows.

Most of the television serials that he has acted in have been on PTV.

In January 2009, Sohail started playing the character Azizi in the show Hasb-e-Haal on Dunya News, where he does humorous commentary on social, current affairs and other topics.

The Government of Pakistan has bestowed upon Sohail the Presidential Pride of Performance (2011) and the Sitara-i-Imtiaz (Star of Excellence) (2013).

== Filmography ==
=== Television serials ===
Year	Title	Role	Director	Channel
1988	Sooraj Ke Sath Sath	Munshi Mehar Dad		PTV
1990	Fishaar	Malik, student leader		PTV
1990	Raig Zar	Murad		PTV
1991	Mitti Da Maan	Qasim		PTV
1992	Aik Din "Saboot"	Baba Barkat		PTV
1992	Hath Ghari	Parvez		PTV
1992	Haveli	Aslam Pardesi		PTV
1992	Din	Badruddin		PTV
1992	Nashaib	Doctor		PTV
1993	Zakham	Zahoor (Zed)		PTV
1993	Shab Daig	Mister Sajjad Shah		PTV
1994	Manchalay Ka Sauda	Umair		PTV
1994	Takmeel	Nawaz		PTV
1994	Ehsan	Younus		PTV
1994	Premesher Singh	Premesher Singh		PTV
1994	Lawrence of Thalabia	Maskeen		PTV
1995	Eendhan			PTV
1995	Dukh Sukh	Mehboob		PTV
1995	Raiza Raiza	Naseeb Muhammad		PTV
1996	Ranjish	Ishaq		PTV
1996	Apne Aur Sapne	Abdul Qadeer		PTV
1998	Home Sweet Home	Bhai Mian		PTV
1998	Comedy Theater	Different roles.		PTV
1999	Dhund			PTV
1999	Girah			PTV
1999	Ghareeb-e-Shehar	Chaudhry Ashraf		PTV
2000	Qafas			PTV
2000	Piya Ki Deewani	Koyal		PTV
2000	Sahib Sarkar	Payaray Khan		PTV
2001	Kajal Ghar	Chaudhry Riyasat Ali		PTV
2003	Shanakht	Chaudhry Habib Ahmed		PTV
2004	Over Smart	Ameer Ali		PTV
2005	Sussar In Law	Chaudhry Akbar		PTV
2006	Malangi	Chaudhry Akram		PTV
2006	Kharidar			ATV
2007	Ibn-e-Adam	Ghalib		ARY Digital
2008	Chowki # 420			AAJ TV
2008	Juda			ATV
2009	Saray Gamay	Chhamma Pehlwan		PTV Home
2010	Shaam		Yes	ATV
2010	Rangeel Pur	Chaudhry Sikandar		PTV Home
2013	Ullu Baraye Farokht Nahi	Ishaq Malkana		Hum TV
2022	Chaudhry and Sons	Chaudhry Dildar Ali		Geo Entertainment
2023	Jeevan Nagar	Babbar Shah / Laali Guru		Green Entertainment
2024	Standup Girl	Ustad Ameer Khan		Green Entertainment
2026	Mitti De Baway	Phajja		Green Entertainment

=== Films ===
Year	Title	Role	Country	Language	Notes
1990	Gori Diyan Jhanjaran		Pakistan	Punjabi	Film debut
1990	Jangloos	Jamshaid	Pakistan	Punjabi	
1995	Shartia Mithay	Munna	Pakistan	Punjabi	Also stage drama of the same name
1997	Umar Mukhtar	Villain	Pakistan	Urdu	
2017	Punjab Nahi Jaungi	Mehtab Khagga	Pakistan	Urdu/Punjabi	
2018	Jawani Phir Nahi Ani 2	Mr. Balani	Pakistan	Urdu	
2022	Dum Mastam	Bao's father	Pakistan	Urdu	
2022	London Nahi Jaunga	Chaudhry Kafil	Pakistan	Urdu/Punjabi	
2022	Ghabrana Nahi Hai	Chaudhry Sajjad	Pakistan	Urdu	
2022	Babe Bhangra Paunde Ne	Mr. Iqbal	India	Punjabi	Indian Punjabi debut
2022	Tich Button	Chaudhry Nijaz	Pakistan	Urdu	
2023	Huey Tum Ajnabi	Khanum Jaan	Pakistan	Urdu	

=== Television shows ===
Year	Title	Role	Channel
2009–Present	Hasb-e-Haal	Azizi	Dunya News
2017	Parody Punch		ARY Digital

=== Stage dramas ===
- Shartiya Mithay
- Kaali Chaadar
- Feeqa In America
- Kotha
- Ek Tera Sanam Khana
- Roti Khol Deo
- Bara maza aye ga
- Double Sawari
- Topi Drama
- Ashiqo Gham Na Karo
- Luddi Hai Jamalou
- Kuch Na Kaho
- Titliyan
- Suway Lal
- Deewanay Mastanay
- Sawa Sair
- Saheli Mere Shohar Ki
- Le Ja Sakhiya
- Shabash Begum
- Khirki Ke Peechay
- Soney Ki Chirya
- Haye Oye
- Kangley Parauhne
- Raja Ab To Aaja
- Haasay Wandi De
- Aik Jhoot Aur Sahi
- Wonderful
- Sohni Lagdi
- Ketchup
- Rawangi Baraat
- Dum Dama Dum
- Love Spot
- Baba Cable
- Kotha
- Hazar Janaab
- Mouqa Milay kadi kadi
- Taj Mahal
- High Speed
- No Tension
- Begum Mujhe Eidi Do
- Paon Ka Zewar
- Wailay Masroof
- Kaun Jeeta Kaun Haara
- Pholay Badshah
- Baba Bori
- Munday Nu Samjhao
- Anokhi Dulhan
- Garam Garam
- Nokar Sahib
- Reshman Jawan Ho Gayi
- Dil Da Boowa
- Check Post
- Hot Pot
- Chabian
- Yeh Baat Aur Hai
- Miss Peeno
- Anjanay Log
- De Ja Sakhya
- Khandan De Khadonay

== Awards and honors ==
- Pride of Performance Award by the President of Pakistan in 2011
- Sitara-i-Imtiaz (Star of Excellence) Award by the President of Pakistan in 2013

== See also ==
- List of Lollywood actors
