= Sultan Ali Lakhani =

Pakistani businessman and former senator

Senator Sultan Ali Lakhani

Member of the Senate of Pakistan
- In office March 1988 – March 1994

Personal details
- Born: 24 July 1948 (age 77) Gondia, Maharashtra, India
- Party: Pakistan Muslim League
- Occupation: Politician; Businessman

Sultan Ali Lakhani (born 24 July 1948) is a Pakistani businessman and former senator who is the co-founder of the Lakson Group and owner of McDonald's Pakistan. He was a member of the Senate of Pakistan from March 1988 to March 1994.

== Early life ==
Lakhani was born on 24 July 1948 in Gondia, Maharashtra, India. He holds a degree in economics from the University of Karachi.

== Career ==
Lakhani was elected to the Senate of Pakistan as a candidate of Pakistan Muslim League on the general seat from Sindh. He was a member of the Senate between March 1988 and March 1994.

He was arrested in 2000 on the orders of National Accountability Bureau (Pakistan) for alleged loan defaults and being a business partner of Hassan Nawaz, son of the former Prime Minister, Nawaz Sharif. They co-owned fast-food chain McDonald's (Pakistan). They were arrested for failing to pay back loans they had taken from various banks.

Lakhani is also the owner of Lakson Group and was the Honorary Consul of Mexico in Karachi.

== Awards and recognition ==
In 2012, Lakhani received the Hilal-i-Imtiaz (Crescent of Excellence) conferred by then President of Pakistan Asif Ali Zardari.
