= Mazaaq Raat =

Pakistani Urdu stand-up comedy and talk show

- Opening screen
- مذاق رات
- Genre: Comedy; Chat show
- Directed by: Shahid Rasheed
- Presented by: Imran Ashraf
- Starring: Imran Ashraf; Sakhawat Naz; Honey Albela; Ayesha Shakoor; Aoun Ali Khan
- Country of origin: Pakistan
- Original language: Urdu
- No. of seasons: 3
- No. of episodes: 2,520+

Production
- Producer: Haseeb Ali Tayyab Anyat ullah
- Camera setup: Multi-camera
- Running time: 34–38 minutes

Original release
- Network: Dunya News
- Release: 8 August 2013 – present

Mazaaq Raat (Urdu/Punjabi :مذاق رات ) is a Pakistani television stand-up comedy and talk show hosted by Imran Ashraf on Dunya TV. The Mazaaq Raati team consisting of Qaiser Pia, Akram Udaas, Iftikhar Thakur, Ayesha Shakoor, and Aoun Ali Khan. Veteran Actor Noman Ijaz hosted the show from 2013 to 2015.

== Cast ==
Host

- Imran Ashraf (2023–present)

Artists

- Honey Albela (2023–present)
- Sakhawat Naz (2013–2016), (2023–present)
- Faisal Ramey (2023–present)
- Akram Udas

Co-Host

- Ayesha Shakoor (2023–present)

DJ

- Aoun Ali Khan (2019–present)
- Wahajat Saeed Khan

=== Former Hosts ===
- Nauman Ijaz (2013-2015)
- Vasay Chaudhary (2015-2023)

=== Former notable cast ===
- Moshin Abbas Haider (2013-2019) as DJ
- Aima Baig (2015-2017) as Co-host
- Amanullah Khan
- Iftikhar Thakur
- Qaiser Piya (-2023)
- Chand Baral

== Seasons Overview ==
Season	Episodes	Originally released	
Season	Episodes	First released	Last released
1	778	September 2, 2013	October 19, 2015
2	1,235	October 27, 2015	July 13, 2023
3	510+	August 14, 2023	TBA

== Episodes ==
There have been 2,523 episodes: 778 in season 1; 1,235 in season 2; and 510 in season 3.

== See also ==
- Aima Baig discography
