= Murtaza Hassan =

Pakistani comedian, actor

Mastana Murtaza Hassan
- Born: 1954; Gujranwala, Punjab, Pakistan
- Died: 11 April 2011 (aged 56–57); Bahawalpur, Punjab, Pakistan
- Occupations: Actor; Comedian; Director; Playwright

Murtaza Hassan (c. 1954 – 11 April 2011), better known by his stage name Mastana, was a Pakistani actor, comedian, theatre director and playwright.

Beginning his career in the '70s, Murtaza worked in many stage shows throughout a career which spanned more than three decades, having performed in over 2,000 stage dramas, mainly in Lahore.

== Career ==
=== Stage and television actor ===
He worked in numerous stage shows such as Aashiqo Gham Na Karo, Dam Dama Dam, Chan Makhna, Bara Maza Aaye Ga, Larri Adda, Kotha, Khandan De Khadonay, Dil Da Jani, Adhay Ghar Wali, Rabba Ishq Na Hoye, Kaun Jeeta Kaun Haara, and Fasad Ki Jarh, among other.

He also appeared in television serials, such as "Uncle Kyun" in the drama Shab Daig.

=== Theatre director and playwright ===
Apart from acting, he also wrote and directed plays, most notably Kotha.

== Death ==
Murtaza Hassan died on 11 April 2011, at the Bahawal Victoria Hospital in Bahawalpur. He was believed to be 57 years old. He had a son, Hafiz M. Saad Hassan.
