= Babu Baral =

Pakistani actor and comedian

- Born: Ayub Akhtar; 1964; Ghakhar Mandi, Wazirabad, Punjab, Pakistan
- Died: 16 April 2011 (aged 46–47); Lahore, Punjab, Pakistan
- Occupations: Actor; Comedian; Director; Playwright
- Years active: 1982–2011
- Spouse: Sobia Ayub
- Children: 4

Ayub Akhtar (ایوب اختر), better known by his stage name Babu Baral (ببو برال), was a Pakistani stage actor, comedian, singer, theatre director and playwright.

He was particularly known for his mimicry, especially of famous singers.

== Personal life ==
Babu Baral was born Ayub Akhtar in Ghakar Mandi, Wazirabad, Punjab, Pakistan in 1964.

He had four children, two daughters and two sons.

His eldest son Nabeel is handicapped, and his second son Gulzar Ahmed has intellectual disabilities and difficulties.

== Career ==
=== Stage actor ===
Babu ventured into theatre in 1982, initially working in Gujranwala city. After some time, Babu moved to Lahore and soon took over the city's theatre circuit, thanks to his talent and hard work.

Over the next 20 years, the artist worked in over 1,000 plays, with Shartiya Mithay and Bhukay Haatha Bataira being some of his biggest hits. In fact, it was not just Lahore that Babu had taken over; he went on to perform around the world and had become an asset for Pakistani theater at the peak of his career

=== Theatre director and playwright ===
He not only acted but also wrote and directed plays, most famously Shartiya Mithay.

== Stage dramas ==
- Shartiya Mithay
- Topi Drama
- Ashiqo Gham Na Karo
- Suhay Lal
- Kuch Na Kaho
- Tere Nakhre Hazar
- Mr. Aflatoon
- Raja Ab To Aaja
- Ghar Ayi Bharjayi
- Baba Luteya Geya
- Akhiyon Se Goli Maare
- Balam bara Zalim
- Buhat Khub
- Mehndi Lagi Mere Hath
- Siyane Bewaqoof
- Hazir Janaab
- Deewanay Mastanay
- Jawab Durust Hai
- Tere Ishq Nachaya
- Mahi Mainu Chala Puwa Dey
- Yaran Naal Baharan

== Death ==
Babu Baral died on April 16, 2011. Babu had been suffering from various health issues, including cancer and kidney problems, for a long time before his death.
