= Express News (TV channel) =

Pakistani Urdu-language TV news channel

Express News HD
- Country: Pakistan
- Broadcast area: South Asia, Middle East, United States, UAE, UK, Ireland, India, Bangladesh Europe
- Network: Lakson Group
- Headquarters: Lahore, Pakistan

Programming
- Language: Urdu
- Picture format: (1080p 16:9 MPEG-4, HDTV)

Ownership
- Owner: Sultan Ali Lakhani
- Sister channels: Chaupal TV, Express Entertainment

History
- Launched: 1 January 2008; 18 years ago

Links
- Website: express.pk

Availability

Streaming media
- Express News Live: Watch Live

Express News HD is an Urdu language Pakistani television news channel based in Karachi, launched on 1 January 2008. It is owned by Lakson Group which also runs the country's third largest Urdu daily newspaper, Daily Express. The owners of the channel, launched 'Express 24/7', a 24-hour Pakistani English news channel on 5 February 2009.

== History ==
At its inception, the news channel introduced a comprehensive fleet of DSNG vans for live coverage across the country, reflecting the parent company's strategy for the Daily Express, which prioritized regional news through local editions. While initially successful, attracting viewers seeking local and regional news and ranking as the second most-watched news channel in Pakistan, this advantage gradually declined as other channels also started providing extensive live local news coverage.

The launch of Express News also coincided with a dispute between Jang Group and the then-serving president, Pervez Musharraf. Geo News underwent a temporary shutdown and had its main talk shows banned. Express News utilized this circumstance to expand its viewership, focusing on immediate and location-specific news coverage.

== Editorial stance ==
The channel maintains a balanced, market-friendly editorial approach and integrates entertainment into its current affairs coverage. It displays a conservative socio-political leaning and a supportive attitude towards security and intelligence agencies. However, these elements occasionally lead to significant self-censorship, directed by Sultan Ali Lakhani, aiming to maintain favorable relations with influential bodies and religious establishments.

== See also ==
- List of news channels in Pakistan
- List of television channels in Pakistan
- Chaupal TV
- Express Entertainment
- Daily Express
