= Bulbulay =

Pakistani family sitcom

- Title screen
- Urdu: بُلبُلے
- Genre: Sitcom; Slapstick; Comedy
- Created by: Rana Rizwan; Salman Iqbal
- Written by: Ali Imran (1–378); Saba Hassan (379–onwards)
- Directed by: Rana Rizwan; Salman Iqbal
- Starring: Nabeel; Ayesha Omar; Mehmood Aslam; Hina Dilpazeer; Ashraf Khan; Shagufta Ejaz
- Theme music composer: Dale Arnie Birch
- Country of origin: Pakistan
- Original language: Urdu
- No. of seasons: 2
- No. of episodes: 840+

Production
- Producer: Rana Rizwan
- Editor: ARY Digital
- Camera setup: Multi-camera setup
- Running time: 20–30 minutes

Original release
- Network: ARY Digital
- Release: October 22, 2009

Bulbulay (Urdu: بُلبُلے, lit. 'Bubbles') is a Pakistani family sitcom series made by ARY Digital about an unconventional Pakistani family of four. The show is directed by Rana Rizwan, written by Ali Imran and Saba Hassan, and produced by Salman Iqbal, who also plays the lead character of the show. The show gained popularity after the introduction of Hina Dilpazeer, who plays Mumtaz (Momo) in the 25th episode.

Bulbulay first aired on 22 October 2009 on ARY Digital and was later broadcast on ARY Digital UK. It is a successful sitcom with a high TRP, and it holds the record for the longest-running television series of Pakistan.

In July 2017, the series went off-air and did not return to air on ARY Digital. Instead starting on 7 May 2019, the show began airing new episodes on BOL Entertainment under the title of Phir Bulbulay, but was halted quickly due to copyright issues, as BOL was not allowed to air the comedy serial.

Bulbulay (season 2) began to air on ARY Digital from 4 June 2019 (Eid ul Fitr 2019), and aired a weekly episode every Saturday evening. As of November 2026, 393 episodes have been released as part of season 2.

== Plot ==
=== Season 1 ===
Most episodes are about Nabeel, Khoobsurat, Momo and Mehmood being conned, robbed, or just having bad luck. Every episode ends with the family being ripped off, or either of the men getting a beating from his wife for flirting with other women. The storyline starts off with Nabeel and Mehmood living in an apartment as bachelors and progresses to both of them marrying and having children.

The show is known to break the fourth wall all the time.

==== Episode 1–25 (pre-marriage) ====
Nabeel's childhood friend Ahmad moves abroad and tells Nabeel to look after his apartment. Nabeel takes advantage of this and starts living in the apartment as landlord and rents out a room to Mehmood. Khoobsurat, who ran away from her wedding just fifteen minutes before it took place, arrives at the same apartment looking for her friend Saima, who is married to Ahmed. Although Nabeel first tells her she cannot move in, he changes his mind after she threatens to tell Saima about the misuse of the apartment.

When Khoobsoorat's father, Siddiqui, comes to take her back, she tells him that she is married to Mehmood Sahab to stop him. When Nabeel's mother, Mumtaz, comes to visit him, he says that Khoobsurat is the housemaid, as his mother would not accept his living together with a woman.

Later in the series, Khoobsurat's father finds out his daughter is unmarried, and informs her that he is coming to take her back home. Nabeel's mother comes to visit her son and tells him that Khoobsurat is a good girl and that they should get married. When she asks Khoobsurat, Khoobsurat is shocked and decides to leave. Later, Nabeel tells Khoobsurat that he really loves her and had fallen in love with her when he saw her for the fourth time (chothi nazar main); and, so, he wants to marry her. Mehmood and Mumtaz started to like each other and want to get married. At Nabeel and Khoobsurat's marriage, after their nikah is read, Nabeel wishes Mehmood could also marry someone along with him on the same day and place, to his surprise, Mehmood replies that he has already decided a wife. Mehmood announces he will marry Mumtaz and tells the qadi to wait and read their nikah as well. Nabeel is shocked by this and feels very uncomfortable about his mother being close to Mehmood. At this moment, Siddiqui arrives to cancel his daughter's wedding. Nabeel informs him that the nikah papers have already been signed. Siddiqui gets very mad, for letting his daughter marry such a wrongful man. In the meantime, Butt sahab, a policeman, enters the scene, demanding the wedding be stopped as it was not legal to marry after 12 am. Siddiqui gives money to dismiss Butt sahab.

==== Episode 26–82 (After marriage) ====
(Nabeel's mother becomes a regular cast member after episode 25.)

Soon after the couples get married, Nabeel gets a call from Ahmad, who tells him he has found someone who will move into the apartment, and that they have two days to move out. Luckily, Khoobsurat's father arranges for a new place for them to live and pays in advance, so that they do not struggle.

Siddiqui also finds a good job offer for Nabeel. Nabeel is forced to attend the job interview by his wife, Khoobsurat. Nabeel later gets declined due to his demanding of a salary of Rs.3–4 lakhs, saying he is made for much bigger things and will not work for anyone who does not see his true potential. As soon as the Bulbulay family move to a new house, the title theme of the drama changed.

==== Episode 83–87 (Bubulay in Dubai) ====
The Bulbulay family goes to Dubai, but without telling each other. Nabeel and Khoobsurat win a trip to Dubai from a lucky draw. Mehmood and Mumtaz go to Dubai for their honeymoon, with their own money. They happen to be booked into the same hotel. While walking in the hall, Nabeel and Mehmood bump into each other. They pretend that they don't know each other and rush back to their rooms. When both families have plans to go to the Oasis Mall, and both Mehmood and Nabeel are taking showers in their rooms, Khoobsurat and Momo wait for them in the hotel lobby and see each other clearly.

Momo goes out of the hotel to avoid Khoobsurat and rushes off in a taxi to the mall. Khoobsurat, Nabeel, and Mehmood go out to find her. After they're reunited, they go to Ibn Battuta Mall the next day, where they meet FM radio producers and are offered jobs that don't work out. Nabeel later meets a woman and starts flirting with her, and convincing her that he is rich and that he has many businesses. Mehmood sahab finds out, and tries to stop Nabeel but this backfires. Afterwards, the family heads to the mall, but Nabeel makes up excuses to go back to the hotel, so Mehmood sahab drugs Nabeel's coffee cup to ruin his date. Nabeel then returns to the hotel and invites the woman to stay in his hotel room. He kept going to the washroom repeatedly due to the effect of the drug. Khoobsurat returns from the mall and discovers the truth, which later on makes her angry at Nabeel.

The next day, Momo meets a man in the hotel lounge and mistakenly picks up his bag thinking it's hers. The man is ordered by his boss to follow Momo to get the bag back, as it contains cash. Meanwhile, the boss, who the bag had belonged to, finds out that Momo is the leader of the Bulbulay gang, so he captures Nabeel, Mehmood, and Khoobsurat, and then blackmails Momo to return the bag in exchange for her gang. The boss then orders the man to capture the bag from her possession. Momo realizing that the bag has cash inside; instead gives a small portion of the money to the man. The boss frees the family thinking the man had received the money. Momo, still having possession of the bag, tells the family and they immediately rush towards the airport.

==== Episode 88–100 (pre-parenthood) ====
(From episode 88, Faizan Shahzad Khan joined Team Bulbulay as associate director and actor)

While returning home from Dubai, Momo loses her bag at the airport. Khoobsurat becomes ill and the others start avoiding her in the fear of catching her disease. Later, Khoobsurat is found to be pregnant, shortly after which Momo also becomes pregnant. Most of the episodes involve the family making preparations for the arrival of their children. Nabeel, however, is unhappy that his mother is having a baby at her age. These episodes also show their pre-parenthood lifestyle in the holy month of Ramadan. On the 100th, Eid-Special episode, Momo and Khoobsurat give birth to a baby son and daughter, respectively.

==== Episode 101–139 (parenthood) ====
Both couples become parents. Mehmood Sahab and Momo name their son Sona, which means gold; and Khoobsurat and Nabeel name their daughter Chaandi, which means silver. These episodes involve events taking place after Sona and Chaandi's births. Nabeel and Mehmood are pressured by their wives to take up jobs to support their children. When the children are admitted into school, the couples compete to see who can provide better for their children.

==== Episode 140–143 (Bulbulay in Lahore) ====
The family races to Lahore to visit Khoobsurat's father, Siddiqui, whom they cannot contact and are worried about. Meanwhile, Siddiqui marries a young woman named Betaab (بیتاب). At first, Siddiqui hides her from them by convincing them there is a soul roaming in the house, but eventually, Siddiqui tells them the truth, which upsets Khoobsurat. On the next day, Siddiqui and his wife leave for their honeymoon, leaving the family behind.

Betaab's brother wants his sister to come back home, and arrives to confront the Bulbulay family. Nabeel tells him that she has gone to her honeymoon with Siddiqui. After not being able to contact Siddiqui, he gets angry and shoots Mehmood sahab. Mehmood sahab plays dead. While they mourn his death, Betaab's brother pays Rs. 12,500 to them because they had threatened to call the police. Betaab's brother comes back and realizes that the gun was fake, later wanting Nabeel's wife in exchange for her sister.

Later, an old friend from the UK visits Siddiqui's house with cash. Nabeel and Mehmood sahab fool him into thinking Siddiqui has died. They take advantage of his money and buy food, and take the money for their traveling expenses from Lahore to Karachi. In the end, they were try escaping, but encounter Siddiqui and his wife, who have returned from their honeymoon.

==== Episode 144–204 ====
The Bulbulay family returns to Javed sahab's house in Karachi. They get into numerous problems and get robbed several times.

==== Episode 205–209 (Bulbulay again in Lahore) ====
The family goes to Lahore after Siddiqui invites Khoobsurat and Chandi to stay in his new house in Lahore. Before they leave, Betaab misplaces the address. The fun starts when they all arrive at Siddiqui's new house.

Siddiqui becomes furious at Betaab for allowing the Bulbulay family to his home, so he requests her to become a jinn to scare away the family. But things don't work out as Nabeel figures out Siddiqui's true intentions. In the meantime, Mehmood executes the role of Baba to release the jinn from Betaab. He sprinkles petrol on her, and as he is about to request for a matchstick, Betaab confesses the truth.

Mehmood's old friend is welcomed to the house. Believing he's rich, Nabeel and Mehmood need to satisfy their costs to visit Minar-e-Pakistan from his wealth. But, the old friend requires the cash that Mehmood owed him ages ago, which is equivalent to Rs. 11 lakhs in the present. Not having cash, he is requested to stay in their house as he is broke. Betaab notices him in the house and he is later framed for being a thief.

One month has passed. Mehmood eavesdrops on Siddiqui, talking about eliminating the Bulbulay family with a bomb. He wakes up early to prepare breakfast. Meanwhile, Siddiqui and Betaab are outside watching a movie and having private time. Mehmood hears a tick-tock sound and assumes it's a time bomb. He tells everyone, and they plan to go out of the house to avoid it but the front door is locked. Later, Mehmood attempts to defuse the bomb but it turns out to be an alarm clock hidden by Momo.

Siddiqui gets enraged and yells at Nabeel for consuming so much of his money. Nabeel comes up with a plan to seek revenge. He hires an actor to play as Siddiqui's wife to in an attempt to sour the relations between Siddiqui and Betaab. It works out, and Siddiqui pays Rs. 5 lakh to let go of the woman, but eventually, he finds out Nabeel's true intentions. Nabeel, Mehmood, and Momo run away. Nabeel tells Khoobsurat to return with Chandi back to Karachi.

==== Episode 210–217 ====
They return to Karachi.

==== Episode 218–267 ====
They are normal, with performances by Momo and Nabeel. Five years have transpired since their marriage.

==== Episode 268–273 (rich) ====
They become rich because of the jinn Ibn e Battuta, son of Battuta, who is a big fan of Momo. A magician had imprisoned him in a bottle, but he is now free. In episode 273, the kidnappers Tome and Moti arrive at the new location and kidnap Nabeel. Momo tells them that all their wealth is in the bottle. They open the bottle and the jinn appears.

==== Episode 274–297 (poor) ====
The jinn takes all their wealth back, and the family becomes poor. In episode 297, Javed Sahab arrives at the new location of Bulbulay to take the family back to the old location. Javed sahab files a FIR because they did not pay the rent for 1 year. In the end, they all try to run away but encounter Siddiqui at their front door.

==== Episode 298–455 (back to the classic Bulbulay) ====
They return to Javed Sahab's's house. Siddiqui pays Javed the family's rent. The family realizes that the Ramadan moon has been sighted, and episode 298 is all about the family making Siddiqui do all their work because he isn't fasting. It's back to the situations of the early episodes in which Nabeel and his family have bad luck. In episode 455, the family decides to go to a world tour.

=== Special episodes ===
Bulbulay Show Special was a two-hour episode (live show) in which the Bulbulay characters were live on ARY Digital, where they met their fans who were present there and took calls from those who weren't. The Bulbulay characters were highly appreciated by their fans.

On 20 May 2016, the cast and writer Ali Imran were invited on ARY Digital morning show Good Morning Pakistan to celebrate 400 episodes of Bulbulay.

810+ episodes

=== Season 2 ===
Season 2 title card

==== Episode 1 - 15 (shifting to new house) ====
The Bulbulay family shifts to the new house on Eid al-Fitr. When Momo and Khoobsurat enter the house, there find two strangers there. Momo and Khoobsurat think they are robbers. They tell Nabeel and Mehmood sahab. Momo then knocks out the strangers. Then a person tells them that those two people were knaves who didn't pay rent for the house. They were very dangerous people who were caught by the police after a 6-month search.

Sher Khan marries to Ghulbaght, who later approaches Nabeel and tells him she loves him. She says that she will shoot Sher Khan and Khoobsurat, and forces Nabeel to marry her after she divorces Sher Khan. Sher Khan thinks that his new wife loves him, but it is revealed that both came up with the idea to shoot Nabeel.

they sometime later in the season see a ghost while sleeping. They come running outside. The next day, they call a man who would make the ghost go away, but the ghost and the man are acting together, and are actually robbers. The man first ate food saying he has no power and ate all the food, after which the girl they saw at night came. They screamed and ran into the house. The girl pretends to be kind. She says she had prepared some food. Nabeel and Mehmood sahab are enamoured of her, so they eat the food. They all fall asleep for 1 hour. When they wake up, they find all their belongings have been stolen.

At the end of this part the landlord comes and seeks refugee in their house as he secretly married another woman. The Bulbulay family upon discovering it bribe the landlord that they won't tell it to his first wife, but Momo having memory loss tells his wife. When she comes there the land lord got the beating from her but also kicked the family out of his house.

Episode 16 - 80 (back to classic Bulbulay)

On Eid al-Adha They return to Javed Sahab's house. Siddiqui once again has to pay Javed the family's rent. When they return to the house they witness a housekeeper standing on the doorsteps who thinks that the family is actually there to commit robbery when he understands who they are he lets them in. Khoobsurat is annoyed of him and orders Nabeel to get rid of him. Meanwhile the housekeeper takes Mehmood Sahab hostage as he thinks that he was robbing a wardrobe while Mehmood told him that the wardrobe belonged to him but the housekeeper didn't listen to him. Then Nabeel hugs the keeper as if he was happy to see Mehmood Sahab being tortured but he secretly put Momos ring in his pocket and later calls Butt Sahab. When he comes Nabeel tells him that there is a thief in their house who has held Mehmood Sahab hostage and also stole his mothers ring . Upon inspecting his pockets Butt Sahab finds the ring and takes the keeper into his custody . He also shouts at Nabeel telling him to save the meat for him as it was Eid . After this they still get into numerous problems and get robbed several times or Nabeel accidentally creates problem for the family.

Episode 81-87 (Marriage Bearue)

(wip)

Episode 87-152 (Inspector Mushtaqs house)

(wip)

Episode 153 - 218 (Joji begums old house)

(wip)

Episod 219 - Present (Joji Begums new house)

(wip)

== Series overview ==
Season	No. of episodes	Originally broadcast (Pakistan)	
Season	No. of episodes	First episode	Last episode
1	455	October 22, 2009	July 2017
2	390+	June 4, 2019	February 2026

== Episodes ==
As of 848 Episodes

- Season 1 | 455
- Season 2 | 393

== Cast and characters ==
=== Main ===
- Nabeel as Nabeel (son of Mumtaz and Roshu, stepson of Mehmood Sahab, husband of Khubsoorat, father of Chandi and halfbrother of Sona )

A lazy, greedy, and selfish man who refuses to find a job and is always looking for quick ways to make money. He often invests using his wife's money, only to discover that he has been scammed. He is Momo and Rushu's son, Mehmood's stepson, Khoobsoorat's husband, Sona's half-brother, and Chaandi's father. He relies on the money sent by his father-in-law, Siddiqui, to Khoobsoorat. Although married, he frequently flirts with other women without success. His wife never feels insecure, knowing his inability to impress other women.

- Ayesha Omar as Khoobsoorat (daughter of Siddiqui, wife of Nabeel, daughter-in-law of Mumtaz and Mehmood Sahab,mother of Chandi and sister-in-law of Sona.

Nabeel’s sensible yet occasionally greedy wife. She is Siddiqui’s daughter and lost her mother at a young age. Khoobsoorat often urges Nabeel to find a job and is frustrated that her father pays their rent. She reminds Nabeel and his family that they are living off her father’s money. Despite frequent arguments with Momo, the two share a deep bond. Whenever Nabeel says something foolish, she retorts, “Shut up, Nabeel!”, to which he replies, “Okay, Jaanu!” (meaning “Okay, darling!”).

- Mehmood Aslam as Mehmood Sahab

Nabeel’s stepfather, Sona’s father, and Momo’s second husband. Despite his age, he tells Momo that it is his first marriage. In Season 2, Episode 247, it is revealed that he was previously married to Parveen and had a son named Vicki, whom he abandoned; however, this detail was only part of that episode’s storyline and was never mentioned again. Mehmood is retired and receives a pension. He tries to make life as comfortable as possible for himself and his wife.

- Hina Dilpazeer as Mumtaz (Momo) (Mehmood Sahab's wife)

Mumtaz, lovingly called Momo by her husband, is a forgetful and comically clueless woman. She often forgets names—including those of her husband, son, and daughter-in-law—and calls them by random names, prompting them to respond with “Oof!” and a facepalm. She frequently forgets the names of objects, referring to them as “woh” (that), leaving everyone guessing what she means. Momo was first married to Nabeel’s father, Rushu, and fifteen years after his death, she married Mehmood Sahab. She has two sons, Nabeel and Sona. Mehmood is her husband, Khoobsoorat her daughter-in-law, and Chaandi her granddaughter. Momo is the most beloved character of the show and has developed a cult following over the years.

- Ashraf Khan as Mustaqeem

Mustaqeem is the husband of Joji Begum. He is an unemployed, self-declared poet who speaks Urdu fluently. He is often afraid of his wife, as she owns all their property. He obeys every command she gives, knowing that failure to do so will result in a severe beating.

- Shagufta Ejaz as Joji Begum and as Hajra APPA Mehmood Sab elder Sister (Mustaqeem's wife)

Joji Begum is a character introduced in the later episodes of Season 2. She is the landlady of the house where the Bulbulay family lives on rent. She has a strong Punjabi accent and is known for being strict, miserly, and controlling. Despite being wealthy, she frequently sends Mustaqeem to borrow groceries such as sugar or tea from neighbors. She dislikes the Bulbulay family but remains stuck with them for the time being.

- Faatima Nabeel as Chaandi (Nabeel and Khoobsoorat's daughter)

Chaandi is Nabeel and Khoobsoorat’s daughter, Mehmood and Momo’s granddaughter, and Sona’s niece. Her name means “Silver” in English. Whenever something goes wrong, she innocently asks her mother, “What happened, Mama?” She is the same age as her uncle, Sona.

- Nyle Rizwan as Sona (Mehmood and Mumtaz's son)

Sona is Mehmood and Momo’s son, Nabeel’s brother, Khoobsoorat’s brother-in-law, and Chaandi’s uncle (though he is the same age as her). His name means “Gold” in English. He idolizes Nabeel and imitates his mannerisms, speech, and behavior.

=== Recurring ===
- Tariq Butt as Butt Sahab (2009–present)

First seen in the very first episode, Butt Sahab is shown sharing a bench with Khoobsoorat at the train station while reading an English newspaper. The narrator explains that he enjoys reading English newspapers and often visits the station to read them for free. The narrator also remarks that he stares at every woman as if she were his wife. Following this, he begins flirting with Khoobsoorat, prompting her to leave the station in irritation. Later, it is revealed that Butt Sahab is a police officer who frequently appears throughout the series. Although a good friend of the family, he is portrayed as incompetent at his job—whenever called for help, he usually makes situations worse instead of resolving them.

- Shahid Khawaja as Dr. Shahid 612 (2013–present)

The Bulbulay family’s eccentric doctor. He was once a mental patient, and after treatment, he became an animal doctor. Dr. Shahid often claims that he is still mentally ill and that his condition cannot be cured. He also humorously mentions having previously suffered from various serious diseases such as tuberculosis, cancer, and hepatitis.

- Ayaz Khan as Sher Khan (Mehmood’s friend) (2012–present)

Sher Khan is a close friend of Mehmood Sahab. He is portrayed as a tough, greedy, and somewhat simple-minded man.

- Khawaja Akmal as Siddiqui (Khoobsoorat’s father) (2009–2017)
- Khaled Anam replaced Khawaja Akmal as Siddiqui (Khoobsoorat’s father) (2019–present)

Siddiqui is Khoobsoorat’s father and Nabeel’s father-in-law. He disapproves of Nabeel because of his laziness and lack of responsibility. When Khoobsoorat first meets him after running away from her wedding, she lies that she is married to Nabeel to avoid being taken back home. Later, when Siddiqui learns that she is not actually married, he decides to bring her home, but by the time he arrives, she and Nabeel are truly married. Despite his resentment toward Nabeel, Siddiqui arranges and pays for a new home for his daughter and, consequently, for the rest of the Bulbulay family to live in. He is the husband of Khoobsoorat’s mother and the father of Bytaab and Nazo.

=== Guest appearances ===
- Benita David as Baytab (Siddiqui's wife) (2012–2015; 2025)
- Uzma Gillani as Malika (Khoobsurat's aunt) (2012)
- Natasha Ali as Rani (2009)
- Aijaz Aslam as Rosho — Nabeel's deceased father; (appeared as a ghost in three episodes) (2011–2021)
- Shamoon Abbasi as Afzal (2009; 2013)
- Fatima Effendi as a big fan (2021)
- Parveen Akbar as Haseena Begum (Mustaqeem's mother) (2023)
- Nayyar Ejaz as Nayyar Bhai — brother-in-law of Mehmood Sahab (2010–2012)
- Shagufta Ejaz as Hajra Appa — sister of Mehmood Sahab (2010)
- Reema Khan — appeared in an Eid special
- Zuhab Khan as Zeeshan — a child lost in a market whom Momo brought home
- Uroosa Siddiqui as Dr. Uroosa
- Irfan Motiwala as a thief (Ramadan episode 160) and, in another episode, as Mehmood's kidnapper (2012–2013)
- Maqsood Hassan as the Devil (Ramadan episodes 163 and 233), and in other episodes as a don and as a magician (2011–2013)
- Ashraf Khan as Momo's father — he also appeared as Khoobsurat's boss and as a doctor in different episodes (first appearance: season 1, episode 7, 2009)
- Badar Khalil as Momo's mother (2010–2014)
- Faysal Qureshi as himself (2009; 2012)
- Saleem Miraj as Abdul Kareem (plumber) (2010–2013)
- Sadia Ghaffar as Janan (Khoobsurat's friend) (2013)
- Sonia Rao as Chanda (salesgirl) (2013–2017)
- Sofia Ahmed as Pari (2013)
- Sunita Marshall as Nazar — Khoobsurat's friend (season 1, episode 10, 2009)
- Rashid Farooqui as a Canadian immigration agent (Shamim Gora) (2011)
- Faizan Shahzad Khan as Faizi Sun (episodes 274–297) (2010–2015)
- Nasir Sharif as a thief (episode 430) (2012–2016)
- Ismail Tara as Ibn-e-Battuta Jinn (multiple episodes) and, in another episode, as a detective (2013–2014)
- Behroze Sabzwari as Muqqaddar — Momo's fiancé (episodes 65 and 163) (2011–2012)
- Mohsin Raza Gillani as a friend of Javed Sahab (2013)
- Dodi Khan as Kalia (2016–2017)
- Marhaba Sheikh as Masoom (2017)
- M. Saleem as Qazi (2016–2017)
- Arif Siddiqui as an agent in the poor locality (2013–2017)
- Shehnaz Pervaiz as Momo's sister (episode 156) (2012–2016)
- Haneef Bachan as Javed Sahab (2014–2016)
- Kauser Siddiqui as Nabeel's girlfriend (episode 354) and, in episode 445, as Siddiqui's lawyer (2015–2016)
- Munir Ahmad as Qasim — a thief who came to take a goat that had swallowed his diamond (Eid ul-Azha special, episode 318) (2014)
- Hanif Awan as a police inspector (episode 314) (2014)
- Javeria Abbasi as Nabeel's kidnapper and as a maid (2009; 2010; 2013)
- Fazal Baltistani as Anwar Kaana (episode 379) (2011–2017)
- Shahab Khan (2014–2017)
- Anum Aqeel as Sonia (episode 453) (2015–2017)
- Hafeez Ali as Khawaja Sira (2009)
- Agha Sheraz as Arabpati Beta (episode 15) (2009–2015)
- Mehboob Sultan as Jaggu Dada (2012–2016)
- Umair Laghari as Tommy — Khoobsurat's cousin (2014–2015)
- Ghulam Mehdi (2015)
- Aadi Adeal Amjad as Bayqarar (2015)
- Obaid Khan (2010–2015)
- Sara Omar as Malka (2011)
- Masoodi (2010–2011)
- Shehraz Hassan as Moti — a kidnapper (2010–2015)
- Master Zohaib as a lost child (2010)
- Bahadur Sheikh as Jaggu Dada's punter (2009–2016)
- Adnan Shah Tipu as Nabeel's friend (episode 168)
- Amber Khan as Nabeel's girlfriend (episode 70) (2011)
- Naeem Sheikh as Khoobsurat's uncle (episode 41) (2010–2012)
- Aslam Rana as Baba (2010–2011)
- Babar Azam as Kaptaan (2024)
- Nawaz Sharif as Chor (2018)

== Copyright issues ==
Nabeel Zafar, the producer of Bulbulay, joined BOL TV as its CEO few years back and decided to bring Bulbulay to BOL. On 7 May 2019, Bulbulay released its second season, titled "Phir Bulbulay", after a gap of 2 years on the BOL Network entertainment channel BOL Entertainment, even though ARY possessed the rights.

However, Nabeel resigned after a dispute with BOL and there were no further talks of shifting Bulbulay from ARY to BOL. After BOL started airing Phir Bulbulay, ARY filed a lawsuit against them for airing the show illegally. Finally, the court issued a stay order against BOL TV and restricted them from airing the sitcom on their channel.

== Reception ==
Due to its popularity, the series is broadcast in other countries, including the UK.

=== Awards and nominations ===
Date of ceremony	Award	Category	Recipient(s) and nominee(s)	Result	References
7 February 2020	PISA 2020	Best Television Actor in Comedy Role	Nabeel Zafar	Nominated	
7 February 2020	PISA 2020	Best Television Actress in Comedy Role	Ayesha Omer	Nominated	
7 February 2020	PISA 2020	Best Television Actress in Comedy Role	Hina Dilpazeer	Nominated	
4 March 2021	ARY People's Choice Awards	Favorite Sitcom	Bulbulay	Won	

== Legacy ==
Writing for The Express Tribune in 2011, Rafay Mahmood noted that the series gave Hina Dilpazeer the best role of her career and made her the most popular actor on TV today.

== See also ==
- List of programs broadcast by ARY Digital
