= Nickelodeon (Pakistani TV channel) =

Defunct Pakistani feed of Nickelodeon

Nickelodeon Pakistan
- Country: Pakistan
- Broadcast area: Nationwide
- Network: ARY Digital Network
- Headquarters: Karachi, Sindh, Pakistan

Programming
- Languages: English; Urdu
- Picture format: 576i SDTV

Ownership
- Owner: ARY Group M/s. ARY Communication (Pvt.) Ltd.
- Sister channels: ARY News; ARY Digital; ARY Musik; ARY Qtv; ARY Zindagi; A Sports

History
- Launched: 23 November 2006; 19 years ago
- Closed: 28 October 2024; 23 months ago

Availability

Streaming media
- PTCL Smart TV: Channel 21

Nickelodeon Pakistan or Nick Pakistan, was a Pakistani pay television channel. It was the Pakistani feed of Nickelodeon, which is operated by domestic media company ARY Group's Digital Network subsidiary under a brand licensing and programming agreement with Paramount Networks EMEAA. The network transmitted over the AsiaSat 7 satellite to cable and satellite viewers in Pakistan and features some portions of the schedule dubbed or subtitled in Urdu, along with some content directly imported from its Indian sister network (owned by Viacom 18). It also occasionally licenses Western market children's films.

The channel was available as a free to air channel until it became encrypted on satellite in 2015. Unlike its Indian counterpart, which it replaced, this feed regularly airs Nickelodeon-related content, as the Indian feed has recently been airing local content more often due to the localization strategy.

== History ==
On 23 November 2006, ARY Digital Network launched Nickelodeon Pakistan, with a brand licensing agreement with Viacom. Prior to the launch of the localized Pakistani feed of Nickelodeon, the Indian feed was provided in Pakistan. It mainly broadcast content in English, along with some programming aired in Hindi rather than being dubbed in Urdu. This caused PEMRA to temporarily suspend Nickelodeon's license in 2016, although the channel later resumed broadcasting.

In 2010, Nickelodeon Pakistan was rebranded to match with the network's worldwide imaging at the time, including its logo. Its website was shut down in early 2021, presumably as it heavily utilized the discontinued Adobe Flash graphics/video format, and it was deemed more cost-effective to utilize the network's Facebook page than build out an entirely new modern website. On 1 April 2022, Nickelodeon Pakistan officially began carrying their schedule in native or dubbed Urdu full-time.

=== Closure ===
On 28 October 2024, Nickelodeon Pakistan suddenly went off air.

== Regulatory actions ==
In 2005, the Pakistan Electronic Media Regulatory Authority issued an order regarding the ban of several private channels because programming which should have been dubbed into Urdu or used Urdu subtitles instead used Hindi terms and references blended into the local scripts or the networks carried all-Hindi versions imported from India outright.

In early 2010, PEMRA again issued a notice against children's networks and suspended the licenses of Nickelodeon and Cartoon Network, disallowing them from broadcasting in Pakistan. In the meantime, the Pakistani government pushed unsuccessfully for PTV or another domestic broadcaster to launch a children's network to replace private broadcasters in order to ensure PEMRA compliance with language standards.

On 1 August 2011, the Minister for Information and Broadcasting, Firdous Ashiq Awan, announced the restoration of the Nickelodeon and Cartoon Network licenses, allowing them to resume programming in Pakistan, though she expressed disappointment that a domestic Pakistani broadcaster would not step up to broadcast children's programming, nor PTV would launch a dedicated channel for that, and that PEMRA would accommodate the launch of any such network.

=== 2016 temporary network suspension and further difficulties ===
In the aftermath of the 2016 Uri attack, PEMRA again focused on Nickelodeon Pakistan as the network had begun to share programming with Nickelodeon India due to cost concerns, both within ARY and Viacom, and felt ARY was shirking off PEMRA's orders in order to economize against their orders; this also included the return of Hindi-blended and all-Hindi content to the Nickelodeon Pakistan schedule since their 2011 relaunch in Pakistan. The regulatory authority ordered a ban of the broadcasting of all Indian-originated media after 19 October, though PEMRA ruled that ARY Group had disregarded the order and continued to air imported programming with Hindi language content from Nickelodeon India during the restricted period. The network's license to broadcast was suspended on 31 October, with local providers pulling the network on PEMRA's orders. Shortly thereafter, on 10 November, a stay from the Sindh High Court effectively nullified the PEMRA order and allowed Nickelodeon to resume programming, stating the body had no authority for the suspension without a comprehensive explanation. ARY also stated that the ruling PML-N party had used the regulatory power of PEMRA to oppose its networks due to its differing political opinions from the PML-N.

On 27 April 2017, the network carried an episode of Winx Club which featured a scene of what PEMRA alleged was an "indecently dressed" character, violating the body's 2015 Electronic Media Code of Conduct. After a month of appeals, PEMRA issued ARY a fine of ₨ 500,000 and warned the network against any further violations.
