= ARY Digital UK =

Pakistani television channel

ARY Digital UK HD
- Country: United Kingdom
- Broadcast area: United Kingdom
- Network: ARY Digital Network
- Headquarters: London

Programming
- Picture format: (1080i HDTV, MPEG-4, 16:9)

Ownership
- Owner: Salman Iqbal
- Parent: Karachi Kings
- Sister channels: New Vision TV (ARY World); QTV

History
- Launched: 13 November 2020; 5 years ago
- Replaced: ARY Family HD
- Former names: Pakistani Channel UK, ARY Digital, ARY Family UK

Links
- Website: arydigitaltv.uk

Availability

Terrestrial
- Sky (Main): Channel 748 (SD Only)
- Sky Glass: Channel 725 (HD Only)

ARY Digital UK is a British Pakistani Urdu entertainment channel.

The channel broadcasts on linear television via SD Variant on Sky Channel 748 and HD Variant on Sky Glass Channel 724 as well as streaming programs on YouTube and ARY Plus. ARY Digital UK have an exclusive website, Facebook and Instagram pages and shares specials clips of TV shows are available on all YouTube, Instagram, Facebook, Twitter and TikTok platforms under ARY Digital HD.

== History ==
ARY Network was launched in the United Kingdom in December 2000 as the Pakistani channel to cater to the Pakistani community living in the region. It used Samacom, an uplink provider based in the UAE, as the uplink teleport station.

Later, the channel rebranded to ARY Digital. It started off with a format similar to PTV Prime and other South Asian channels; it provided slots for soap operas in general while presenting an hourly slot for news headlines.

In February 2017, ARY Network UK, which consisted of ARY Digital, ARY News, ARY QTV, ARY World News and ARY Entertainment was banned in the UK.

In March 2017, a company called New Vision TV bought the rights to broadcast ARY News and ARY Digital in the UK. In April 2017, ARY News was relaunched as New Vision TV, airing content from ARY News and some UK based shows. On 12 December 2017, ARY Digital UK relaunched as ARY Family airing content from ARY Digital and launching a few UK based shows.

On 13 November 2020, ARY Family UK rebranded to ARY Digital UK airing content from ARY Digital and some shows for UK viewers.

On 27 February 2025 ARY Network Launched its HD Variant for ARY Digital and New Vision TV (ARY World) on Sky Glass channels 724 and 725 Respectively.

== Programming ==
=== Dramas ===
Date	Show	Ref
8 October 2025 – Present	SharPasand	
20 November 2025 – Present	Madawa	
26 December 2025 - 27 March 2026	Sazawaar	

=== Sitcom ===
Year	Show	Genre
2019–present	Bulbulay Season 2	Sitcom

=== Non-scripted/reality shows ===
Year	Show	Genre	Ref
2011–present	Good Morning Pakistan	Reality; Morning Talk Show	
2014–present	Jeeto Pakistan	Reality; Game Show	

== Controversy ==
In February 2017, ARY Network UK, which consisted of ARY Digital UK, ARY News, ARY QTV, ARY World News and ARY Entertainment was banned in the UK.
