= Aunty Disco Project =

Pakistani indie rock band

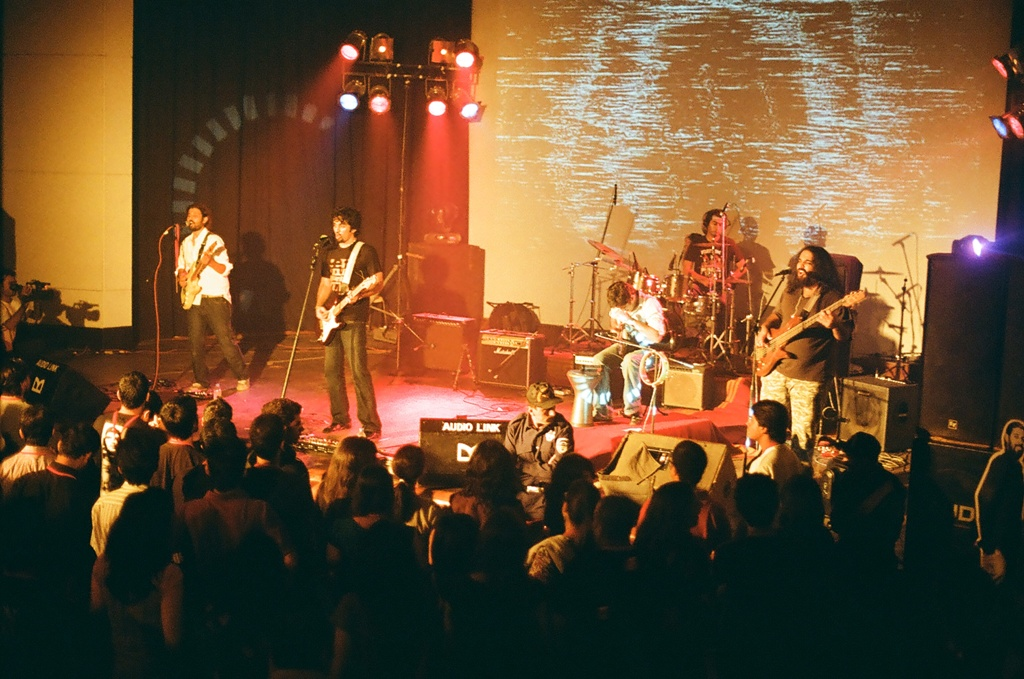
- Aunty Disco Project performing live at Get Your Aunty On! concert at Rangoonwala Auditorium.

Background information
- Origin: Karachi, Sindh, Pakistan
- Genres: Indie rock, indie pop, pop rock, alternative rock
- Years active: 2006–2011
- Label: Independent
- Members: Omar Bilal Akhtar; Imran Lodhi; Hamza Qureshi; Khawer Khan; Ali Alam
- Past members: Omar Khalid; Yasir; Khawer Amir Khan
- Website: www.getyourauntyon.com

Aunty Disco Project (Urdu: آنٹی ڈسکو پراجیکٹ in English sometimes shortened as ADP) is an indie rock band from Karachi, Sindh, Pakistan, formed in 2006. The band's initial line-up consisted of Omar Bilal Akhtar as vocalist and guitarist, along with bassist Imran Lodhi, guitarist Khawer Khan and drummer Omar Khalid, since then there had been many changes in the line-up but the current line-up has only Omar Bilal Akhtar on the lead vocals and lead guitars, Imran Lodhi on Bass, Khawer Khan on guitars & Hamza Qureshi on the drums. The band was widely regarded as one of the best live acts in the country.

The band became quickly popular in the underground scene with their high energy live act and their performance of original songs, something that was very unusual for an unknown band to do in the local music scene. Within a short time, the band achieved mainstream success and garnered critical acclaim for their electrifying live performances. This was followed by the band working on their debut album in September 2006 at New Shadab Studios. The band released their self-titled debut album Aunty Disco Project in December 2007, independently, produced and written by the band themselves. The album achieved success as the band received wide acclaim and exposure alongside mainstream acts. After a 2-month hiatus, Aunty Disco Project made a comeback to the music industry with the release of their third music video, "Nazar". The video, directed by Umer Adil was the bands' first high budget video and it got them widespread mainstream attention. The video was critically lauded and for the first time Aunty Disco Project was on the music channel charts. The song was included in The Musik's, Top 100 videos of 2008. Based on the success of this video, the band were nominated for "Best Breakthrough Performance" at the first MTV Music Awards in Pakistan.

In 2010, the band featured at the third season of the musical television show Coke Studio where the band performed their single "Sultanat", which was a huge commercial success for the band. However, a year later, Aunty Disco Project through their official blog informed their fans that they would disband after their final concert that took place on 25 June 2011.

== History ==
=== Early days and formation (2006) ===
Omar Akhtar and Omar Khalid along with their friend Afaan Naqvi performed at Caffeine as part of an Open-Mic Night. After the show they were approached by Muhammad Fahim Tahir, Khawer Amir Khan and Yasir Qureshi in February 2006. This was followed by the group having a get-together at Omar Akhtar's home and performing several jam sessions with one another. The jam sessions were not successful for the group. This led the band to perform a few proper jam sessions with each other, these jam sessions saw Omar Khalid on the drums, Yasir Qureshi on darbuka, Imran Lodhi on bass, Khawer and Omar Akhtar on guitars and vocals, thus performing as a proper band.

The name of the band was suggested by Omar Akhtar after a discussion with Muhammad Fahim Tahir. In response to Fahim's suggestions, Omar said, "man that's just dumb, we might as well call ourselves something stupider, like …I dunno "Aunty Disco Project".

On 10 March, the band performed their first ever gig at TCG Ilmathon under the name "Eastern Comfort". The gig was attended by five people in total. On 23 March, the band took part in Institute of Business Administration annual Battle of the Bands competition which they eventually went on to winning after beating twenty two other participating bands from Karachi, Sindh. The success of their performance led the band to perform several concerts and gigs at many local colleges and restaurants. Aunty Disco Project's energetic live acts and their performance of original songs, with a unique indie rock blending with eastern percussion, started to create a cult following for the band. This success made them one of the top underground bands in the local music industry. Soon after this success, lead guitarist Khawer Khan departed from the band, leaving quartet to continue as a band.

On 15 July, the band attempts to get on television by auditioning for the show MTV Battle of the Bands by MTV Pakistan. Although the band were not selected at the competition by the judges, Strings, the show was never aired on television. In August, the band decided to go to recording a full-length studio album. The following month, Aunty Disco Project started working on their debut self-titled album Aunty Disco Project at the New Shadab Studios in Karachi. The album was solely written and produced by the band themselves and included some of their well known songs such as "Sultanat", "Iss Tanhai Ko" and "Nazar".

=== Struggle (2007) ===
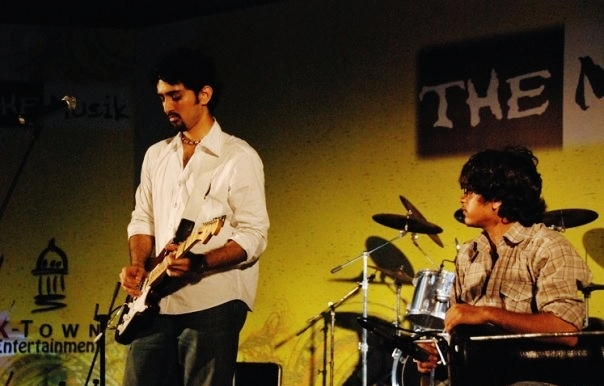
Aunty Disco Project performing live at K-Fest Royal Rodale Show, Karachi, in 2007. Visible from left to right are; vocalist Omar Bilal Akhtar and Yasir Qureshi on darbuka.

In the summer of 2007, the band continued to grow more mature and professional as live performers as the band received wide acclaim and exposure by performing alongside mainstream singers and groups such as Sajid & Zeeshan, Mizraab, Mauj and Zeb and Haniya. One of the breakthrough and successful live performances included the K-Fest Royal Rodale Show hosted by the local music channel, The Musik, in Karachi. The concert featured many well known musicians and acts like Mauj and Mizraab alongside Aunty Disco Project.

On 14 August, Aunty Disco Project headlined the first Shanaakht Festival along with pop duo Zeb and Haniya. The concert was held on the independence day of Pakistan where the band opened up the show. This was followed by the band releasing their first music video "Sultanat" in same month. The video, directed by the band's lead vocalist Omar Bilal Akhtar, brought the band their first taste of mainstream success as "Sultanat" received a large amount of airtime, on both radio and television, and afterwards followed by releasing their second single and video "Iss Tanhai Ko" shortly after.

In December 2007, the band finally released their self-financed and self-produced album Aunty Disco Project, selling the album exclusively at their live shows and some select café's in Karachi. While not commercially successful, the band was lauded for its unique approach to music distribution and they received heavy promotion in the press and on the Internet.

=== Mainstream breakthrough (2008–2009) ===
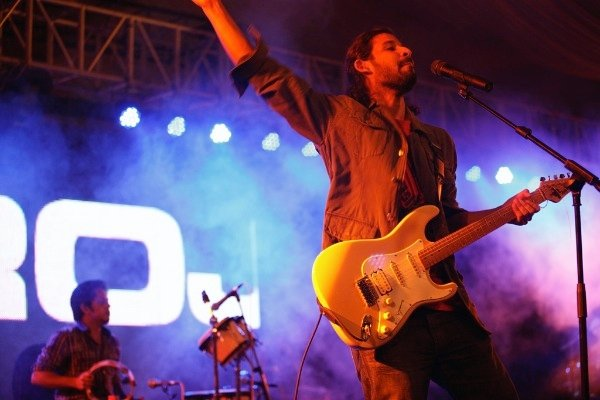
Aunty Disco Project performing live at Shaanakht Festival 2009, Karachi, in 2009. Visible from left to right are; Yasir Qureshi on darbuka and Ali Alam on guitars.

In February 2008, Imran Lodhi departed from the band to pursue further studies abroad. Lodhi was then replaced by former Ganda Banda and 3-D Cats lead vocalist Ali Alam who joined the group to take the bass as a sessionist for live performances. However, Aunty Disco Project members continued as group and performed some prolific live performances which included the shows at Indus Valley School of Art and Architecture and another performance at World Music Day, both held in the month of June in Karachi, Sindh. Soon after, the band went on hiatus.

In August, Aunty Disco Project started to work on the music video of their single "Nazar", being directed by Umer Adil. The band made a comeback into the mainstream airwaves with the release of their third music video and single, the ballad "Nazar", after a hiatus of 2 months. The video, directed by Umer Adil was the bands' first high budget video and it got them widespread mainstream attention. The video was critically lauded and for the first time Aunty Disco Project made it on the local music channel charts. Later, the band's breakthrough into the mainstream led their third single, "Nazar", music video to be included in The Musik's Top 100 videos of 2008. The success of "Nazar" introduced Aunty Disco Project to a wider audiences as the band made their way to performing live shows for local music channels such as Play TV and MTV Pakistan. In November, Aunty Disco Project went on performing live at the Ego Concert held at the Forum Mall along with Zeb and Haniya in Karachi. The performance was attended by a large number of audiences and was a success for the band. By the end of the year, Aunty Disco Project were nominated at the MTV Music Awards for the 'Best Breakthrough Performance' by a musician or a group in Pakistan, based on the success of their single "Nazar". However, the band did not win the award but it was a great achievement for the group.

In February 2009, the band performed at the famed Rafi Peer Theatre, Peeru's Cafe to critical acclaim, in Lahore, Punjab. This was the very first time Aunty Disco Project performed outside of Karachi, Sindh. In April, the band signed with Two Five Right Artist Management and welcomed the addition of sessionist Ali Alam as a full-time member of the group on guitars and vocals. The band also recruited former Mizraab, a progressive rock band, bassist Rahail Siddiqui, who took over on bass guitars. This was followed by the band performing an unplugged session gig at the MTV Unplugged in June. This was followed by the band releasing a live album MTV Unplugged for their performance at the show.

On 16 August, the group performed live at Get Your Aunty On! concert at Rangoonwala Auditorium, for which the band released a live album as well, Live at Get Your Aunty On!. Aunty Disco Project made a second string at the Shaanakht Festival, headlining the show once again. After many live performances, The band gradually made their name in the music industry and continued to be widely regarded as one of the best live acts in the country. The band also engaged themselves in releasing their second studio album, also being their first commercial effort after their debut album was released independently and was commercially not successful. The album was slated to be released in late 2009, however, the album was not released and was shelved due to the critical and dire state of the music industry in Pakistan and also the band not getting any record label to release their album.

=== Continued success (2010) ===
In May 2010, it was confirmed that the line-up for the Coke Studio third season included Aunty Disco Project as one of the shows' featured bands along with many mainstream bands like Noori and Entity Paradigm, from Lahore, sufi musicians like Abida Parveen, Sanam Marvi and many other well known artists. On 2 and 3 July, Aunty Disco Project performed at the Pakistan American Cultural Center in Karachi, Sindh. On 4 July, the band made its debut at Coke Studio in the third episode, titled 'Conception', where Aunty Disco Project performed a rendition of their version of its popular hit "Sultanat" (from their selft-titled album Aunty Disco Project). The Express Tribune praised and criticised the band, saying "Aunty Disco Project performed a rollicking version of its popular hit, "Sultanat", making far better use of the house band than some of the other acts, such as Karavan and Entity Paradigm, did. However, the song's inclusion in an episode charged with powerful vocals and lyrics was a bit of a damper. While on its own, the song is stellar and a crowd-pleaser, it did not gel well with the rest of the acts, a fate that also befell Karavan."

On 24 July, the local newspaper, The Express Tribune, writer Saba Imtiaz, on a review of Coke Studio third season third episode, criticised that Aunty Disco Projects' performance was disappointing, saying, "..repetitiveness (how many times will we hear "Sultanat" before Aunty Disco Project gets rid of it?)..". On 4 August, another article on Coke Studio was published by The Express Tribune written by Saba Imtiaz, where the band were once again subject to criticism for their performance at the show, ".."Sultanat", it's a good song but not their best and certainly didn't suit the Coke Studio mood".

On 16 October, Aunty Disco Project through a web blog, confirmed that there are releasing a new single and dedicating it to the flood victims of Pakistan as the band became part of the Superstars for Flood Relief campaign. On 23 October, the band released their first single "Hum Na Rahay" from their upcoming second studio album. On 1 December, a teaser video of "Hum Na Rahay" was aired on all local television stations and was released on the band's official YouTube page. On 28 December, Aunty Disco Project released the music video of their single "Hum Na Rahay", directed by Bilal Khan & Shayan Agha.

=== Breakup (2011–2012) ===
"We are in no way breaking up because of personal animosities or differences. We will always be family to each other. We're breaking up because the demands of real life were too difficult to ignore and because of our duty to fulfill individual personal and family commitments. We have decided to give each other the space to pursue our own ambitions.... We aren't ruling out the possibility of performing together in the future but Aunty Disco Project will formally cease to exist as of this summer."

— Aunty Disco Project

On 19 April 2011, the band performed at the Indus Valley School of Art and Architecture in Karachi. On 5 May, Aunty Disco Project through a statement from their official blog informed their fans that they would disband after their final concert that will take place on 25 June 2011. In the statement, the band confirmed that their break-up is not because of personal animosities or differences among the band members. However, the band also said that they are not ruling the possibility of performing together in the future but Aunty Disco Project will formally cease to exist as of this summer. The band also mentioned that they will in the coming months try to release several recorded songs, some of which you've heard at our shows, some of which are brand new.

On 10 May, in an interview with The Express Tribune Omar Bilal Akhtar, the lead vocalist and guitarist, informed he will go to Columbia University to obtain a degree in journalism. "We achieved much more than we had ever imagined, so I'm content with what we did. Individually, of course, there's so much left to do and it'll be a challenge to do it without the band – but it's also exciting at the same time to map out a new plan. Right now it's too early to think about my musical future, so I'll cross that bridge when I reach it." said Omar Bilal Akhtar. Where as, Yasir Qureshi and Ali Alam said that would continue to pursue their career as musicians. On 14 May, The Express Tribune released an article about the history of the band and suggesting the band as one of the most active band's from Karachi coming to an end.

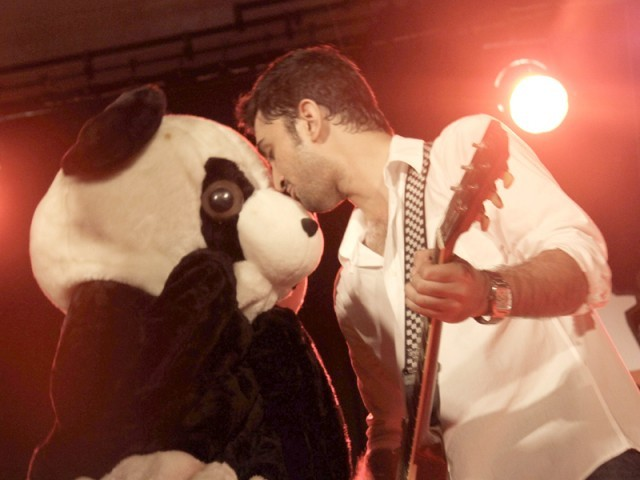
Aunty Disco Project performing their last concert at PACC, Karachi, on 25 June 2011.

On 25 June, Aunty Disco Project performed their last and final concert One Last Time at the Pakistan American Cultural Center. They opened with The Who's "Baba O'Riley" and sublimely pummelled The Clash's "Rock the Casbah", followed by performing Dropkick Murphys "I'm Shipping Up to Boston". Soon afterwards, the band performed their original ballads – "Nazar" and "Kitnay Vaaday" with both Ahktar and rhythm guitarist Ali Alam harmonising on vocals. Also, performing some original songs like "Hum Na Rahay", "Likhta Nahin Main" and "Dastana-e-Dil". "Hum Na Rahey" had accessible chord progressions, fizzy guitar fillers and pop sound like percussion, there was a guest appearance from a giant stuffed panda, from the latest band music video. The band performed a version of The Rolling Stones "Sympathy for the Devil". Aunty Disco Project put an end to the concert by performing Queen's "We Are the Champions".

On 3 September, Aunty Disco Project released a short film for their new single "Kisi Aur Ka Intezaar Hai" which included footage from the band's last concert One Last Time held in Karachi. The short film was directed by Shayan Agha & Bilal Khan, who also directed the band's music video for "Hum Na Rahay". The single was dedicated to the fans of Aunty Disco Project.

On 3 March 2012, Aunty Disco Project released an unreleased single "Jaagay Zameen" through their official Facebook page. This was followed by the band releasing another unreleased song "Mujhay Sahara Do", a week later, on 8 March. Both the songs were part of the band's upcoming second album, which did not release due to the band disbanding.

== Awards and nominations ==
Aunty Disco Project have only received one nomination at the MTV Music Video Awards for the "Best Breakthrough Performance" award for their single "Nazar" in 2008. Overall, Aunty Disco Project have only received one nomination but have not won any award.

== Discography ==
Studio albums

- Aunty Disco Project (2007)

Live albums

- MTV Unplugged (2009)
- Live at Get Your Aunty On! (2009)

== Band members ==
Final members

- Omar Bilal Akhtar – vocals, lead guitar (2006–2011)
- Yasir Qureshi – darbuka, percussion (2006–2011)
- Ali Alam – vocals, guitars (2009–2011)
- Rahail Siddiqui – bass guitar (2009–2011)
- Giles Goveas – drums (2009–2011)

Former members

- Khawer Khan – guitar, backing vocals (2006)
- Imran Khan Lodhi – bass guitar (2006–2008)
- Omar Khalid – drums (2006–2009)

== See also ==
- List of Pakistani music bands
