= Aunty Disco Project (album) =

Studio album by Aunty Disco Project
- Released: December 2007
- Recorded: June 2006–December 2007
- Studios: New Shadab Studios (Karachi, Pakistan)
- Genres: Alternative rock, indie rock, pop rock
- Length: 40:19
- Label: Independent
- Producer: Omar Bilal Akhtar

Aunty Disco Project chronology
Aunty Disco Project (2007)	MTV Unplugged (2009)

Aunty Disco Project (Urdu: آنٹی ڈسکو پراجیکٹ, sometimes shortened in English as ADP) is the debut self-titled studio album of the Pakistani indie rock band Aunty Disco Project, released in December, 2007 independently at New Shadab Studios. The album achieved success as the band received wide acclaim and exposure alongside mainstream acts.

The self-titled debut album is independently produced and written by the band themselves. The first single from the album was "Sultanat" for which a music video was released on July 27, 2007 followed by the release of another single "Iss Tanhai Ko" on October 28. Aunty Disco Project made a comeback to the music industry with the release of their third music video, “Nazar”, released in August 2008.

== History ==
=== Background ===
Omar Akhtar and Omar Khalid along with their friend Afaan Naqvi performed at Caffeine as part of an Open-Mic Night. After the show they were approached by Imran Lodhi, Khawer Amir Khan and Yasir Qureshi in February 2006. This was followed by the group having a get-together at Omar Akhtar's home and performing several jam sessions with one another. The jam sessions were not successful for the group. This led the band to perform a few proper jam sessions with each other, these jam sessions saw Omar Khalid on the drums, Yasir Qureshi on darbuka, Imran Lodhi on bass, Khawer and Omar Akhtar on guitars and vocals, thus performing as a proper band.

The name of the band was suggested by Omar Akhtar after a discussion with Khawer Khan. In response to Khawer's suggestions, Omar said, "man that’s just dumb, we might as well call ourselves something stupider, like …I dunno "Aunty Disco Project".

On March 10, the band performed their first ever gig at TCG Ilmathon under the name "Eastern Comfort". The gig was attended by five people in total. On March 23, the band took part in Institute of Business Administration annual Battle of the Bands competition which they eventually went on to winning after beating twenty two other participating bands from Karachi, Sindh. The success of their performance led the band to perform several concerts and gigs at many local colleges and restaurants. Aunty Disco Project's energetic live acts and their performance of original songs, with a unique indie rock blending with eastern percussion, started to create a cult following for the band. This success made them one of the top underground bands in the local music industry. Soon after this success, lead guitarist Khawer Khan departed from the band, leaving quartet to continue as a band.

On July 15, the band attempts to get on television by auditioning for the show MTV Battle of the Bands by MTV Pakistan. Although the band were not selected at the competition by the judges, Strings, the show was never aired on television. In August, the band decided to go to recording a full-length studio album. The following month, Aunty Disco Project started working on their debut self-titled album Aunty Disco Project at the New Shadab Studios in Karachi. The album was solely written and produced by the band themselves and included some of their well known songs such as "Sultanat", "Iss Tanhai Ko" and "Nazar".

In the summer if 2007, the band continued to grow more mature and professional as live performers as the band received wide acclaim and exposure by performing alongside mainstream singers and groups such as Sajid & Zeeshan, Mizraab, Mauj and Zeb and Haniya. One of the breakthrough and successful live performances included the K-Fest Royal Rodale Show hosted by the local music channel, The Musik, in Karachi. The concert featured many well known musicians and acts like Mauj and Mizraab alongside Aunty Disco Project.

On August 14, Aunty Disco Project headlined the first Shanaakht Festival along with pop duo Zeb and Haniya. The concert was held on the independence day of Pakistan where the band opened up the show. This was followed by the band releasing their first music video "Sultanat" in same month. The video, directed by the band's lead vocalist Omar Bilal Akhtar, brought the band their first taste of mainstream success as "Sultanat" received a large amount of airtime, on both radio and television, and afterwards followed by releasing their second single and video "Iss Tanhai Ko" shortly after.

=== Release ===
Nazar
Nazar, from Aunty Disco Project, is the third single released by the band. The music video of the song is directed by Umer Adil, bands' first high budget video, released in 2008. The video was released after a 2-month hiatus and the success of the single led the band to be nominated for the Best Breakthrough Performance award at the MTV Music Awards, in Pakistan. However, the band did not win the award but it was a great achievement as the band got widespread mainstream attention. The music video of the single was also listed in the Top 100 videos of 2008 by The Musik.

In December 2007, the band finally released their self-financed and self-produced album Aunty Disco Project, selling the album exclusively at their live shows and some select cafe's in Karachi. While not commercially successful, the band was lauded for its unique approach to music distribution and they received heavy promotion in the press and on the Internet.

In February 2008, Imran Lodhi departed from the band to pursue further studies abroad. Lodhi was then replaced by former Ganda Banda and 3-D Cats lead vocalist Ali Alam who joined the group to take the bass as a sessionist for live performances. However, Aunty Disco Project members continued as group and performed some prolific live performances which included the shows at Indus Valley School of Art and Architecture and another performance at World Music Day, both held in the month of June in Karachi, Sindh. Soon after, the band went on hiatus.

In August, Aunty Disco Project started to work on the music video of their single "Nazar", being directed by Umer Adil. The band made a comeback into the mainstream airwaves with the release of their third music video and single, the ballad "Nazar", after a hiatus of 2 months. The video, directed by Umer Adil was the bands' first high budget video and it got them widespread mainstream attention. The video was critically lauded and for the first time Aunty Disco Project made it on the local music channel charts. Later, the band's breakthrough into the mainstream led their third single, "Nazar", music video to be included in The Musik's Top 100 videos of 2008. The success of "Nazar" introduced Aunty Disco Project to a wider audiences as the band made their way to performing live shows for local music channels such as Play TV and MTV Pakistan. In November, Aunty Disco Project went on performing live at the Ego Concert held at the Forum Mall along with Zeb and Haniya in Karachi. The performance was attended by a large number of audiences and was a success for the band. By the end of the year, Aunty Disco Project were nominated at the MTV Music Awards for the 'Best Breakthrough Performance' by a musician or a group in Pakistan, based on the success of their single "Nazar". However, the band did not win the award but it was a great achievement for the group.

In February 2009, the band performed at the famed Rafi Peer Theatre, Peeru's Cafe to critical acclaim, in Lahore, Punjab. This was the very first time Aunty Disco Project performed outside of Karachi, Sindh. In April, the band signed with Two Five Right Artist Management and welcomed the addition of sessionist Ali Alam as a full-time member of the group on guitars and vocals. The band also recruited former Mizraab, a progressive rock band, bassist Rahail Siddiqui, who took over on bass guitars. This was followed by the band performing an unplugged session gig at the MTV Unplugged in June. This was followed by the band releasing a live album MTV Unplugged for their performance at the show.

On August 16, the group performed live at Get Your Aunty On! concert at Rangoonwala Auditorium, for which the band released a live album as well, Live at Get Your Aunty On!. Aunty Disco Project made a second string at the Shaanakht Festival, headlining the show once again. After many live performances, The band gradually made their name in the music industry and continued to be widely regarded as one of the best live acts in the country.

== Track listing ==
All music written, composed & arranged by Aunty Disco Project.

Aunty Disco Project
No.	Title	Length
1.	"Sultanat"	4:07
2.	"Iss Tanhai Ko"	3:50
3.	"Such"
4.	"Nazar"	3:28
5.	"Sheher Ke Aansoo"	4:05
6.	"Sajna"	3:46
7.	"Kitnay Vaaday"	2:58
8.	"Gaatha Main Chaloon"	4:48
9.	"Likhta Nahin Main"	4:11
10.	"Dhoop"	5:05
11.	"Kisi Aur Ka Intezaar"	3:58
Total length:		40:19

== Personnel ==
All information is taken from the CD.

Aunty Disco Project

- Omar Bilal Akhtar - vocals, lead guitar, keyboards
- Imran Lodhi Khan – bass, vocals, guitars
- Yasir Qureshi - percussion, backing vocals
- Omar Khan - drums

Production

- Produced by Aunty Disco Project
- Recorded & Mixed at New Shadab Studios in Karachi, Pakistan
