= Asad Ahmed =

Pakistani guitarist (born 1971)

Asad Ahmed اسد احمد
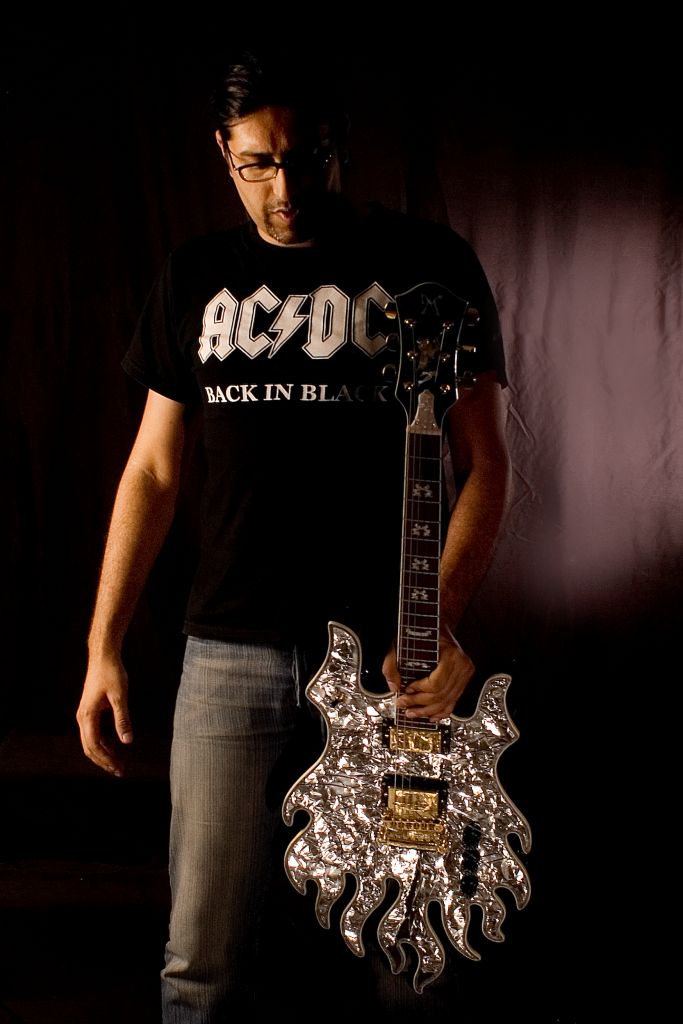
- Asad with his Minarik Shattered Mirror Inferno

Background information
- Born: 21 July 1971 (age 55); Karachi, Pakistan
- Origin: Karachi, Pakistan
- Genres: Hard rock, heavy metal
- Occupations: Musician, Songwriter, Record producer, Entrepreneur
- Instrument: Guitar
- Years active: 1987 – present
- Member of: Karavan; Awaz; Vital Signs

Asad Ahmed (born 21 July 1971) is a Pakistani guitarist. He has been a member of various musical groups and some of the earliest Pakistani rock bands like The Barbarians, Awaz, Karavan, Junoon, Vital Signs as well as Coke Studio Pakistan.

== Early life ==
His family moved to Dubai when he was quite young. His elder brother was a guitarist and when he left for college, he left his guitar back at home. Asad picked it up and quickly learned to play. His family returned to Karachi in 1984.

== Personal life ==
On 14 February 2019, Ahmed married Hira after they had dated for two years. They got married in a nikah ceremony attended by close family and friends in Karachi.

== Career ==
=== Coke Studio (Pakistan) ===
Asad played in Coke Studio (produced by Rohail Hyatt) and was one of the house band members from season 2 (2008) to season 6 (2012) and reappeared in season 13 in 2020. His guitar-playing has some flashy showmanship to it.

=== The Barbarians ===
Asad started his music career in 1987 with The Barbarians, which is regarded by many as Pakistan's first rock band. The band's first single "Yeh Zindagi Hai" (This is Life) set the foundation of Pakistani rock.

They released their only album, the self-titled "The Barbarians" in 1989 with the label EMI (Pakistan), which did not fare well in the then rock-repellant Pakistani music industry. The Barbarians band fell apart in 1990.

=== Junoon and Vital Signs ===
Asad did a gig with Salman Ahmad of Junoon at a party in 1991. On Salman's invitation, he hopped on board with Junoon band and played bass with them for about a year. In a performance at Marriott Hotel Islamabad in November 1992, he met Haroon and Faakhir of Awaz and Rohail Hyatt of Vital Signs. This led to his performances on Vital Signs' Aitebar and Hum Tum.

=== Awaz ===
Awaz was formed in December 1992, by Haroon, Faakhir and Asad Ahmed. The band went on to become the next best thing in Pakistani pop scene after Vital Signs. Awaz were highly skilled and talented musicians, producers and composers. The band's skill at composing and producing was often overlooked and the focus was on their good looks, glossy videos, catch songs and wild stage performances. Awaz was the first band from Pakistan to appear on MTV on 20 April 1992 with the song Jan-e-Man. Awaz released three albums. The first album was the self-titled album Awaz, more commonly known as Awaz 1. The second album was Jadu Ka Chiraagh and the third and last album was Shola. After Shola, the band fell apart due to the differences among the three and they went their own ways in 1997. Haroon and Faakhir started their solo careers. Awaz had a 'sold out' concert at Wembley Arena, London in 1995.

=== Karavan ===
In 1997, foreseeing a disintegrating Awaz, Asad established his own studio. Simultaneously, he joined hands with Sameer Ahmed to form Karavan, thus returning to his rock origins. They brought the already established solo singer Najam Sheraz as the first vocalist and Alan Smith as drummer to complete the line-up. In 1999, Najam Sheraz returned to his solo career, vacating the vocalist's slot for newcomer Tanseer Daar. Karavan released Rakh Aas in 1997, Safar in 1999 and Gardish in 2002. In 2005, The band issued an internet only Unplugged album. Karavan released their fourth and final studio album, Saara Jahan in 2010. The band broke up in 2012.

Asad released his second solo album Severe Cuts in July 2020. The first single, "Dream of Right Now" was sent to Radio on 14 July 2020.

== Discography ==
- The Barabarians (EMI 1990)
- Nusrat Hussain – Amrit (EMI 1992)
- Awaz – Awaz (EMI 1993)
- Vital Signs – Aitebar (EMI 1993)
- Awaz – Jadu Ka Chiraagh (LIPS 1995)
- Vital Signs – Hum Tum (VCI 1995)
- Awaz – Shola (BMG/Crescendo 1996)
- Karavan – Rakh Aas (VCI 1997)
- Najam Sheraz – Roop Nagar (LIPS 1999)
- Pepsi World Cup Album (VCI 1999)
- Karavan – Safar (Eagle Records 2000)
- Haroon – Haroon Ki Awaz (BMN 2000)
- Karavan – Gardish (DJ Gold 2002)
- Sajjad Ali – Teri Yaad (SOUNDMASTER 2002)
- Rahat Fateh Ali Khan – Paap (2003)
- Haroon – Lagan (BMN 2003)
- Karavan – Unplugged and unreleased (Internet only release 2005)
- Haroon – Haroon Ka Nasha (The Muzik Records 2007)
- Rahat Fateh Ali Khan Charkha (Sa Re Ga Ma 2008)
- Karavan – Saara Jahan (The Musik records 2010)
- Rebirth – First solo instrumental album (Released by EMI Pakistan Ltd. 2017)
- Asad Ahmed – Severe Cuts (2020)
- Asad Ahmed – Ascension (2020)
- Asad Ahmed - A Cosmic Intervention (2022)

== See also ==
- Awaz
- Karavan
- Haroon
- Faakhir Mehmood
