= Aunty Disco Project discography =

Discography of Aunty Disco Project, a Pakistani indie rock band

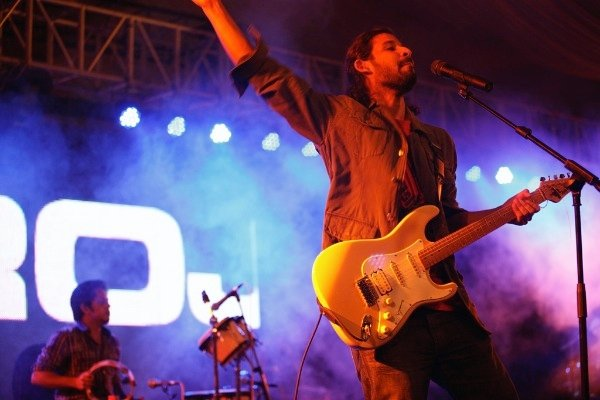
- Aunty Disco Project performing live at Shaanakht Festival 2009, Karachi, in 2009. Visible from left to right are; Yasir Qureshi on darbuka and Ali Alam on guitars.
- Studio albums: 1
- Live albums: 2
- Singles: 5
- Music videos: 5

The discography of Aunty Disco Project, a Pakistani indie rock band, consists of one studio album, as well as numerous live albums, singles and music videos. The band was formed by lead guitarist and vocalist Omar Bilal Akhtar, along with bassist Imran Lodhi, guitarist Khawer Khan, drummer Omar Khalid and darbuka player Yasir Qureshi in 2006.

The band became quickly popular in the underground scene with their high energy live act and their performance of original songs, something that was very unusual for an unknown band to do in the local music scene. Within a short time, the band achieved mainstream success and garnered critical acclaim for their electrifying live performances. This was followed by the band working on their debut album in September 2006 at New Shadab Studios. The band released their self-titled debut album Aunty Disco Project in December 2007, independently, produced and written by the band themselves. The album achieved success as the band received wide acclaim and exposure alongside mainstream acts. After a 2-month hiatus, Aunty Disco Project made a comeback to the music industry with the release of their third music video, “Nazar”. The video, directed by Umer Adil was the bands' first high budget video and it got them widespread mainstream attention. The video was critically lauded and for the first time Aunty Disco Project was on the music channel charts. The song was included in The Musik's, Top 100 videos of 2008. Based on the success of this video, the band were nominated for “Best Breakthrough Performance” at the first MTV Music Awards in Pakistan.

In 2010, the band featured at the third season of the musical television show Coke Studio where the band performed their single “Sultanat”, which was a huge commercial success for the band. However, a year later, Aunty Disco Project through their official blog informed their fans that they would disband after their final concert that took place on June 25, 2011.

== Albums ==
=== Studio albums ===
Year	Album information
2007	Aunty Disco Project: Released: December, 2007; Recorded: June 2006 – December 2007 at New Shadab Studios in Karachi, Pakistan; Label: Independent; Producer: Omar Bilal Akthar

=== Live albums ===
Year	Album information
2009	MTV Unplugged: Released: June, 2009; Recorded: June, 2009 at MTV Pakistan Studios in Karachi, Pakistan; Label: Independent; Producer: Omar Bilal Akhtar
2009	Live at Get Your Aunty On!: Released: August 16, 2009; Recorded: August 16, 2009 at Rangoonwala Auditorium in Karachi, Pakistan; Label: Independent; Producer: Omar Bilal Akhtar

== Singles ==
Year	Song	Album
2007	Sultanat	Aunty Disco Project
2007	Is Tanhai Ko	Aunty Disco Project
2008	Nazar	Aunty Disco Project
2010	Hum Na Rahay (Meray Masoom Dost)	Superstars for Flood Relief
2011	Kisi Aur Ka Intezaar Hai	Kisi Aur Ka Intezaar Hai

== Music videos ==
Date	Title	Director
July 23, 2007	Sultanat	Omar Bilal Akhtar
October 28, 2007	Is Tanhai Ko	Azfar Jalil
October 7, 2008	Nazar	Umer Adil
July 4, 2010	Sultanat (Coke Studio version)	Rohail Hyatt
December 28, 2010	Hum Na Rahay (Meray Masoom Dost)	Bilal Khan & Shayan Agha
September 3, 2011	Kisi Aur Ka Intezaar Hai	Bilal Khan & Shayan Agha
