= Burka Avenger =

Pakistani animated television series

- Series logo
- Urdu: برقعہ ایوینجر
- Genre: Action; Comedy; Superhero fiction Edutainment
- Created by: Haroon
- Written by: Adi Abdurab; Asad Zafar; Arslan Naseer; Haroon; Khaya Ahmed; Shehzad Ghias; Nida Hasan Fancy; Syed Zain Raza; Ahmer Naqvi
- Directed by: Haroon
- Theme music composer: Haroon
- Opening theme: Burka Avenger
- Ending theme: Lady in Black
- Country of origin: Pakistan
- Original language: Urdu
- No. of seasons: 4
- No. of episodes: 52

Production
- Producer: Haroon
- Running time: Approx. 22 minutes
- Production company: Unicorn Black

Original release
- Network: Geo Tez (season 1); Nickelodeon Pakistan (season 2–4)
- Release: 28 July 2013 – 13 January 2016

Burka Avenger (Urdu: برقعہ ایوینجر) is a Pakistani animated television series created, directed and produced by Haroon.

Unicorn Black founder and international pop star Haroon (AKA Aaron Haroon Rashid) created the series as a way to emphasise the importance of girls’ education in Pakistan and elsewhere, as well as issues such as equality and discrimination. Burka Avenger originally premiered on Geo Tez, but moved to Nick Pakistan from season 2. Four seasons, containing a total of 52 episodes were directed and produced by Haroon at Unicorn Black, have been launched to great success in Pakistan. It then made its international airing in Afghanistan, India and Indonesia and has been dubbed in many languages including Turkish, Arabic, Tamil, Pashto, and Persian.

Named by Time magazine as one of the most Influential Fictional Characters of 2013, the Urdu series first aired on 28 July 2013. The series has received worldwide acclaim for its focus on social issues and delivering it in an informative and entertaining manner.

== Plot ==
Burka Avenger is set in the fictional town of Halwapur in northern Pakistan. It features a superheroine who wears a burka as a disguise to conceal her identity while fighting villains. Her alter ego is Jiya, an "inspirational teacher" at an all-girls’ school. Jiya fights corrupt politicians and vengeful mercenaries who attempt to shut down girls’ schools, using "Takht Kabadi", a martial art that involves throwing books and pens. Together with children 'Ashu', 'Immu' and 'Mooli', the Burka Avenger fights the evil magician 'Baba Bandook', his henchmen and corrupt politician 'Vadero Pajero'.

The main characters include three children, twins Ashu and Immu, their friend Mooli (who takes his sobriquet from his enthusiasm for the vegetable of the same name), his pet goat Golu, Jiya (the Burka Avenger), the villainous magician Baba Bandook, corrupt politician Vadero Pajero, and Jiya's adoptive father Kabbadi Jan.

== Music ==
Episodes of Burka Avenger feature music from artists such as Ali Zafar, Ali Azmat, and JoSH, as well as Haroon. Rapper Adil Omar and Haroon released a music video featuring the Burka Avenger called "Don't Mess With the Lady in Black". Popular music videos released to date featuring music and animation from the series include the following: by: Aeron Tamayo

S. No.	Song	Artist	Year
1	"Lady in Black"	Haroon & Adil Omar	2013
2	"Baba Bandook"	Ali Azmat & Haroon	2013
3	"Vadero Pajero"	Qayaas feat. Haroon	2013
4	"Channo"	Ali Zafar	2013
5	"Jeet Mein Haar Mein"	JoSH	2013
6	"Hum Hain"	Haroon	2015
7	"Rocket Rickshaw"	Haroon	2015

== Awards and achievements ==
Burka Avenger has won several major international awards and accolades including the following:

S. No.	Awards / Accolades	Category	Result	Year
1	Peabody Award	N/A	Won	2013
2	International Emmy Awards	Kids: Animation	Nominated	2015
3	Prix Jeunesse International	International Gender Equity Prize	Won	2013
4	Asian Media Awards	Best TV Show	Won	2014
5	Canada International Film Festival	Animation	Rising Star Award	2014
6	Accolades Global Film Festival	Viewer Impact: Content / Message Delivery	Award of Merit (Special Mention)	2014
7	LUMS International Film Festival	Animation	Won	2014
8	National Innovation Award	Art & Design	Won	2017

== Broadcast ==
Burka Avenger has been launched successfully in Pakistan in Urdu language. It then dubbed in many languages including Arabic, Pashto, Persian, and Indonesian for international broadcasts, like in Afghanistan, India and Indonesia.

Network	Season	Date	Language
Pakistan
Geo Tez	1	July 2013	Urdu
Geo Kahani	1	July 2014	Urdu
Nickelodeon	1	November 2014	Urdu
Nickelodeon	2	February 2015	Urdu
Nickelodeon	3	June 2015	Urdu
Nickelodeon	4	December 2015	Urdu
ATV		22 July 2017	Urdu
AVT Khyber	1	July 2016	Pashto
India
ZeeQ	1 and 2	13 June 2015	Hindi
ZeeQ	1 and 2	13 June 2015	English
ZeeQ	1 and 2	13 June 2015	Tamil
ZeeQ	1 and 2	13 June 2015	Telugu
Afghanistan
Tolo TV	1	11 January 2015	Persian
Tolo TV	2-4	15 November 2015	Persian
Lemar TV	1	25 January 2015	Pashto
Lemar TV	2-4	29 November 2015	Pashto
Indonesia
ANTV	1-4	8 April 2017 July 2023	Indonesian

== Reception ==
Burka Avenger received mainly positive reviews and praise for its female empowerment themes and also inspired many. Time magazine rated the show as one of the most Influential Fictional Characters of 2013. In an article on Burka Avenger, the Huffington Post stated that "Disney could learn a thing or two". The Washington Post elaborated on this, stating "Pakistan's new superhero makes the hoop-skirted, Prince Charming-obsessed Disney princesses look downright antiquated. She was not born into royalty. She does not obsess about her beauty. And she definitely does not want or need to be whisked off on some white horse or magic carpet. No, Jiya, or the Burka Avenger, is too busy defending women's rights and education for all. Now that's what I call a role model for girls". CBC News put Burka Avenger's rave reviews down to "its colourful animation, pro-education message and cross-generational appeal", going on to state that "many are proudly referring to the character as Pakistan's Wonder Woman."

Alyssa Rosenberg is a Features Editor of Think Progress. Her writings are based on the intersection of culture and politics. She commented that "American superhero stories could stand to think more about Jiya's dual role, and how she turns perceived disadvantages or the tools of her trade into strengths." Pakistan's Dawn News referred to Burka Avenger as an "international phenomenon" due to its content.

Burka Avenger has been praised for its promotion of women's education in Pakistan. This is Pakistan's first animated female superhero. Reviewers have noted parallels between the series and Malala Yousafzai, a Pakistani girl who was shot in an assassination attempt by Taliban gunmen. The fundamentalists in the series who try to shut down the girls' school have drawn comparisons to the Taliban who have destroyed hundreds of schools in Northwest Pakistan.

Women's groups in India have welcomed the move to air Burka Avenger. "A lot of problems that women in India face stem from the cultural upbringing which conditions the mind of children," said Noorjehan Safia Niaz, founder of the Ashana Trust, which supports women's initiatives for justice and development.

Burka Avenger is also the most watched children's TV show in Afghanistan. According to a survey conducted in Afghanistan from mothers and focus groups in urban areas, 85% of children watch Burka Avenger in Afghanistan. Massood Sanjer, head of Tolo TV in Afghanistan, said Burka Avenger "has had a significant impact on the promotion of girls’ education, women empowerment and tolerance in Afghanistan," adding: “We believe Burka Avenger will continue to contribute to positive social changes in the future.”

Burka Avenger launched to huge success in Indonesia in April 2017. Burka Avenger was the most watched children's show in the ages 5–14 category in its first month of launch and the nationwide slot leader.

== Criticism and response ==
Some of the initial commentary on the series focused on Jiya's choice of attire when in disguise (the burqa) Politician and former Pakistani Ambassador to the US, Sherry Rehman, commented on 27 July 2013 that "Burka Avenger is good, but I don't like the feudal stereotyping or the burqa. A dupatta (head scarf) could have done the job of relating to context." In an interview on Australian TV Channel ABC News, Haroon responded to criticism, stating, "Most superheroes wear disguises and a show about a woman not wearing a disguise would be a different show." When asked about the choice to clothe the superheroine in a burqa, Haroon emphasized that the character 'Jiya' does not wear a burqa, headscarf or veil by day. "We chose the burqa because we wanted a local relatable flavor.” "We wanted to hide her identity the way superheroes do. She doesn't wear the burqa during the day – she doesn't even wear a headscarf, or a hijab or anything like that; she goes about her business as a normal teacher would. And so she chooses to wear the burqa only as a disguise, she's not oppressed ... and on the other end of the spectrum, a lot of female superheroes in the West are objectified, and sort of sexualized in their costumes, like Catwoman and Wonder Woman (referring to the 1970's TV series), and that certainly would not work here."

== See also ==
- Team Muhafiz
- 3 Bahadur
