= Awaz =

Pakistani pop music group

- Origin: Karachi, Sindh, Pakistan
- Genre: Pop rock
- Years active: 1992–2000
- Labels: EMI Records, BMG Records, Lips Music Records
- Past members: Haroon Rashid; Faakhir Mehmood; Keith Venantius; Asad Ahmed

Awaz (Urdu: آواز transl. Voice) was a Pakistani pop band that formed in Islamabad in 1992.

The group was formed by Haroon Rashid, lead vocalist, who was soon joined by keyboardist Faakhir Mehmood, and two guitarists Keith Venantius and Asad Ahmed. Awaz were one of the pioneer bands of the local pop music scene and were highly skilled and talented musicians, producers and composers. The band's skill at composing and producing was often overlooked and the focus was on their good looks, glossy videos, catchy songs and wild stage performances.

Awaz achieved commercial success in Pakistan with the release of their self-titled debut album, Awaz, in 1993. The single "Janeman" was an instant hit as they became the first band from South Asia to appear on MTV in April 1992; Janeman was composed by lead vocalist Haroon Rashid, produced by Haroon and Faakhir with lyrics written by Sarmed Mirza and Haroon. Their second studio album, Jadoo Ka Charagh, was released in 1995, and included the hit singles "Jadoo Ka Charagh" and "Shawa". The album proved to be better than the first studio release and stood up to everybody's expectations. In 1996, the band went on to record and release their third studio album, Shola, which included their biggest hit song "Mr. Fraudiay". Their third album comprised elements of western music and less traditional eastern music unlike the previous albums. The very patriotic number Ay Jawaan was one of their most loved songs, followed by Jadoo Ka Chiragh and the comic, Mr. Fraudiye. Due to a dispute among the group's members in late 1999, Haroon and Faakhir went on to pursue their solo careers while Keith immigrated and Asad Ahmed formed Karavan.

== History ==
=== Formation (1992) ===
Haroon Rashid, during his college years at Washington D.C., thought of the name "Awaz" for the band and after graduating with a degree in Business Administration from the George Washington University he returned to Pakistan. First, he recruited keyboardist and friend Faakhir Mehmood and then the former The Barbarians band's guitarists, Keith Venantius and Asad Ahmed, whom he met at a performance in Marriott Hotel, Islamabad, in November 1992. Awaz was formed in December of that year.

After performing at a few concerts, the band decided to record an album and release a music video. But first felt the need to be signed by a major record label and later on were signed to EMI (Pakistan). The band went on to make a video for the single "Janeman", from their self-titled debut album, on a shoestring budget of Rs. 15,000 sponsored by a private company based in the capital, Islamabad. The band sent the video to all local TV stations and record labels but the overall response was very negative and nobody showed any interest. Says Haroon "They responded by saying 'stick to your day job.' but I was stubborn and decided to send it off to MTV Asia to see what happens" and the song "Janeman" became the first ever Urdu/Hindi pop song to air on MTV on 20 April 1992. The song was composed by Haroon himself when he only 16 years old, and the lyrics were written by Sarmed Mirza.

=== Success (1993–1996) ===
After the release of the music video, Awaz started to gain success as the song made a great impact locally. This was the band's initial break-out and after that many record labels and local TV stations called the band with several offers. By January 1993, the band were signed to Pepsi for a year; the contract was later renewed till 1997. In March, Asad left college and dedicated himself to making money by playing music for the band. In May, Awaz released their self-titled debut album, Awaz, which included hit songs like "Janey Kaun Thi Haseena", "Diya", "Oh Girl" and "Janeman".

Later the same year, Awaz along with Vital Signs went on tour to England, United Kingdom. During this time, Rizwan-ul-Haq left Vital Signs to join Awaz and was replaced by Aamir Zaki by his former band. Aamir Zaki, before the tour, also left Vital Signs and then the band asked for Asad Ahmed, lead guitarist of Awaz, to play on their third studio album, Aitebar.

After the success of the band's self-titled debut album, the band were started to be known as the "Take That of Pakistan" as the three member band came out with new, electrifying music, that made a great impact in the Pakistani music industry. The band went on to record their second studio album after the success of their debut album. And in January 1995, Awaz released their critically acclaimed second album, Jadoo Ka Charagh, which shot the band to more success during that year with the release of the hit singles "Jadoo Ka Charagh" and "Shawa". The album proved to be better than the first studio release and stood up to everybody's expectations.

In August 1996, Awaz went on releasing their third studio album, Shola, which included the band's biggest hit single of all time "Mr. Fraudiay" along with other songs like "Shola", "Mela", "Soniay" and "Hoga". Their third album was slightly different from the previous album releases and it did not sound like the traditional music. The album comprised elements of western music and had less traditional eastern music unlike the previous albums had. Later the same year, drummer, John "Gumby" Louis Pinto and former Vital Signs rhythm guitarist, Aamir Zaki, joined the band for an international tour.

=== End of fame (1997–1999) ===
In January 1997, after foreseeing a disintegrating Awaz, Keith Venantius immigrated and Asad Ahmed established his own studio. Simultaneously, he joined hands with his friend Sameer Ahmad, forming his own rock band, Karavan, thus returning to his rock origins. Also, recruiting already an established solo singer Najam Sheraz on vocals and Allan Smith on drums. In September, Awaz released another single, this time a patriotic song, "Aai Jawan". The video of the song only featured Faakhir and Haroon.

In November, Asad, with his band, released its debut album, Rakh Aas. Later the same year, Gumby and Aamir Zaki left the band to work on Najam Sheraz's second solo studio album, Roop Nagar, released in 1999. Also in December 1999, Karavan went on releasing their second studio album, Safar.

=== Language ===
On their debut album Awaz, songs were written in both the English and Urdu languages, but since then the band has only written songs in Urdu, with the only exceptions being "Shine" and "Never Get Away" from their third album Shola and the unreleased single "Believe in Love", recorded in 1995. Haroon in an interview have said that he prefers writing lyrics in English, but when releasing an album he thinks from an Urdu perspective.

=== Influence ===
Haroon Rashid, writer of most of the band's lyrics and music scores, says that most of his inspiration for Awaz's songs from The Beatles music. Songs like "Oh Girl" and "Janeman" (from Awaz) are example of this influence. Other songs, such as "Diya" (from Awaz), "Shola" (from Shola) have elements of rock music, and some others, like "Janey Kaun Thi Haseena" (from Awaz), "Jadoo Ka Charagh" and "Shawa" (from Jadoo Ka Charagh) have elements of classical eastern music.

On the other hand, Awaz has also been noted as a source of inspiration for other bands. Most notably, Pakistani underground rock band Flam! have performed Awaz's hit song "Jadoo Ka Charagh" in many different concerts. Bollywood music director Usha Khanna copied the Awaz's single "Janey Kaun Thi Haseena" music and lyrics for the film Sanam Harjai, released in 1995.

=== Musical style ===
Mein Bhi Pakistan
Mein Bhi Pakistan, Awaz's song from their second studio album Jadoo Ka Charagh. The song is based on a poem written by Sehba Akhtar.

Jaanay Kaun Thi Haseena
Jaanay Kaun Thi Haseena, Awaz's song from their debut studio album Awaz. The single was plagiarised as a soundtrack of the Bollywood movie Sanam Harjai by music directed by Usha Khanna.

Awaz performs of western music and classical eastern traditional music. Their music has been one major force which has truly kept the national spirits high amidst the prevailing social woes which have surely worsened in the last few decades. Songs like "Mein Bhi Pakistani", "Watan Kahani" and "Aai Jawan" are examples. Their music has been captivating to the Pakistani youth for over ten years and have been the only saving grace of Pakistani music internationally after the departure of groups like Vital Signs and Nazia and Zoheb.

Since the release of their debut studio album, Awaz the band's music has been based on classical eastern traditional music blending with western music. Their third studio album Shola comprised elements of western music and less traditional eastern music unlike the previous albums had.

Awaz were highly skilled and talented musicians, producers and composers. The band's skill at composing and producing was often overlooked and the focus was on their good looks, glossy videos, catch songs and wild stage performances. Haroon was renowned for his ability to sing live and perform break dance moves at the same time. Awaz was the first band from Pakistan or India to appear on MTV on 20 April 1992 with the song "Janeman", composed by Haroon when he was only 15 years old, and written by Sarmed Mirza. Their biggest hit was the song "Mr. Fraudiay", a tongue in cheek satire on corruption in Pakistan.

== Discography ==
Studio albums

- Awaz (1993)
- Jadoo Ka Charagh (1995)
- Shola (1996)

Compilations

- The Best of Awaz (1997)
- Shola-Jadoo Ka Charagh (2001)

== Band members ==
Original line-up

- Haroon Rashid – lead vocals (1992–2000)
- Faakhir Mehmood – vocals, keyboards, piano (1992–2000)
- Keith Venantius – vocals, guitars (1992–1994)
- Asad Ahmed – lead guitars (1992–1997)

Session musicians

- Rizwan-ul-Haq – rhythm guitars (1993–1995)
- Aamir Zaki – rhythm guitars (1996–1998)
- John "Gumby" Louis Pinto – drums (1996–1998)

Timeline

== See also ==
- List of Pakistani music bands
- Haroon
- Faakhir Mehmood
- Asad Ahmed
