= ARY Musik =

Pakistani music channel

ARY Musik HD
- You only live once!
- Country: Pakistan
- Broadcast area: Pakistan and Worldwide
- Network: ARY Digital Network
- Headquarters: Karachi, Sindh, Pakistan

Programming
- Languages: Urdu, English
- Picture format: (1080i HDTV, 16:9, MPEG-4)

Ownership
- Owner: Salman Iqbal
- Parent: Karachi Kings
- Sister channels: ARY Digital; ARY News; ARY Zindagi; ARY Qtv; A Sports

History
- Launched: 14 August 2003; 22 years ago
- Former names: The Musik

Links
- Website: www.arymusik.tv

ARY Musik HD (Urdu: اے آر وائے میوزک, formerly The Musik) is a Pakistani pay television music channel, first launched in August 2003 as "The Musik" in Dubai by Salman Iqbal. It is part of the ARY Digital Network. In 2009 its name was changed to "ARY Musik". It features music genres including pop, rock, rap, bhangra, classical, and folk. It also airs interactive shows, celebrity interviews, comic fillers, theme shows, animations and live concerts.

The channel's longest-running international music-based show was Music Hour with Wiqar Ali Khan, hosted in English and Pashto. ARY Musik is one of the first satellite channels to have live link-ups between its studios based in London (UK), USA, Pakistan, India, Bangladesh, Sri Lanka, Afghanistan, Dubai, Cologne (Germany) and Slovenia.

== Programs ==
The programs aired by ARY Musik include:

- Cellaholic Live
- Ghuru-Ho-Ja-Shuru
- Musik Top Ten
- Spot On Live
- Singing With Ovais Singstar
- Sajid Billa
- Salam-e-Ishaq
- Video on Trial
- Just Drive

=== Former programs ===
- All For Love
- Bingo
- Exposed
- Fallout
- F Stop
- Kismat Connection
- Rising Star
- Rock On

== The Musik Records ==
The Musik Records was a Pakistani record label that originated at the same time as the launch of ARY Musik and was active till the early 2010s. It retained ARY Musik's former name, The Musik. It was one of the two major record labels in Pakistan that was active till the 2010s with the other being Fire Records. Some of the albums the label released include Atif Aslam's Doorie, Haroon's Haroon Ka Nasha, Karavan's Saara Jahan, Aaroh's Raag Neela and Mekaal Hasan Band's Saptak. The label had the distribution rights for these albums in Pakistan only.

Prior to ARY Musik's launch, the record label was referred to as ARY Records. Albums released under ARY Records include Faakhir's Aatish and Junoon's Daur-e-Junoon.

In 2016, the label under the network name ARY Musik released Abrar-Ul-Haq's album Billo Part 2.

== See also ==
- List of music channels in Pakistan
