= ARY News =

News channel

ARY News HD
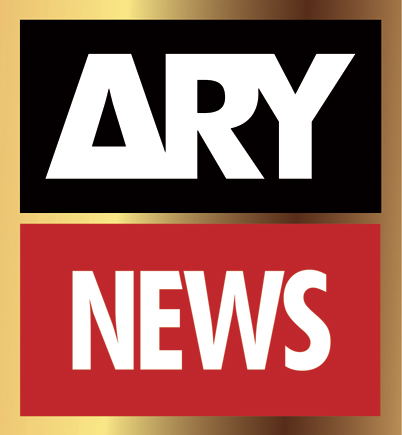
- Country: Pakistan
- Broadcast area: Worldwide
- Network: ARY Digital Network
- Headquarters: Karachi, Sindh, Pakistan

Programming
- Picture format: (1080p 16:9, HDTV MPEG-4)

Ownership
- Owner: Abdul Razzak Yaqoob; Salman Iqbal
- Parent: Karachi Kings
- Sister channels: ARY Digital; A Sports; ARY Musik; ARY Qtv; ARY Zindagi

History
- Launched: December 2000; 25 years ago
- Former names: ARY OneWorld (2003–2009)

Links
- Webcast: Watch Live
- Website: www.arynews.tv

Availability

Terrestrial
- Sky (United Kingdom): Channel 735 (as New Vision TV)
- Zuku TV (Kenya): Channel 920
- Virgin Media: Channel 204
- Rogers Cable (Canada): Channel 2709
- Akash Digital TV (Bangladesh): Channel 217

ARY News HD (Urdu: ARY نیوز) is a Pakistani news channel launched on December 2003 with the name "ARY One World", the channel was later renamed to "ARY One World" until May 2009 when it was rebranded as "ARY News". A bilingual news channel in English and Urdu, it is a part of the ARY Digital Network, which is a subsidiary of ARY Group. ARY is an acronym of Abdul Razzak Yaqoob and Salman Iqbal, who was the owner of ARY Group. ARY head office located in Karachi, Pakistan.

== Sister channels ==
- ARY News - 24/7 News Channel
- ARY Digital - general entertainment channel
- ARY Musik - music channel
- ARY Qtv - religious channel
- ARY Zindagi - general entertainment channel
- A Sports - sports channel
- ARY Sahulat Bazar - ARY Online Shopping Store

== Programs ==
- Sawal Yeh Hai
- 11th Hour
- Hoshyarian
- Bakhabar Savera
- Aiteraz Hai
- Jahan Bean
- The Reporters
- Har Lamha Purjosh
- Off The Record
- Yaad e Rafta
- Khabar Muhammad Malick Ke Sath

=== Former shows ===
- Ab Tak
- Andar Ki Baat
- Anjaam
- Jurm Bolta Hai
- The Morning Show
- Power Play
- Sar e Aam
- On My Radar

International Questions With Riz khan(Rizwan Khan)

Insight With Javed Mailk

Focus With Faeza

Pakistan Tonight With Fahd Hussain

Katera With Moin Akhtar

Daira With Munizae Jahangir

Wake Up Pakistan Licture series By Zaid Hamid

The Story Behind

End Of Times Special series By Dr Shahid Masood

Aghaaz with aniq ahmed

Views On News With DR Shahid Masood

Khara Such With Mubashir Luqman

== International availability ==
ARY News is available in the United States via Dish Network.

== See also ==
- List of news channels in Pakistan
