= ARY Digital =

Pakistani television channel

ARY Digital HD ARY ڈیجیٹل HD
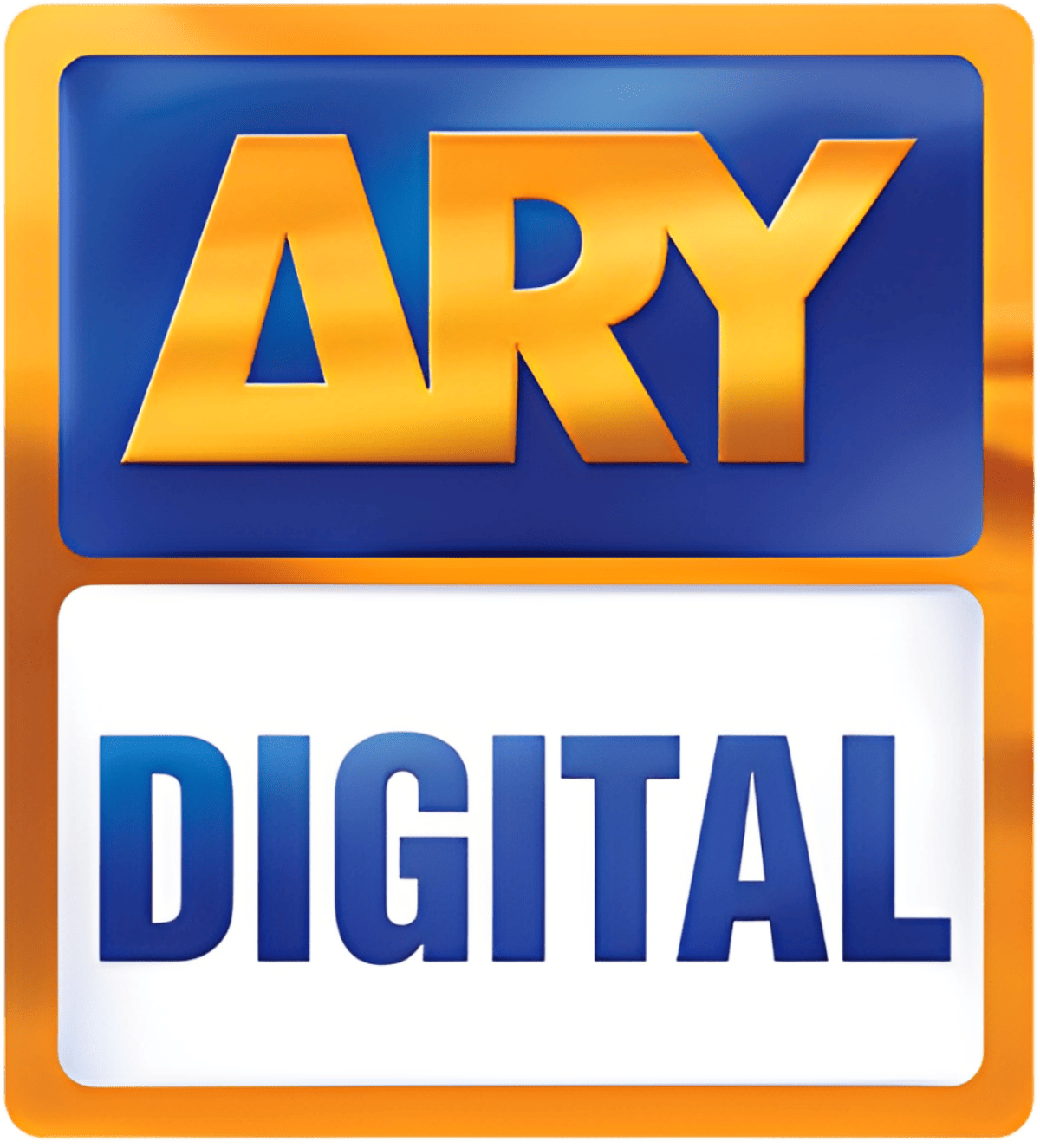
- ARY Digital logo since May 2009
- Country: Pakistan
- Broadcast area: Pakistan; Middle East; North America; Europe; Asia-Pacific
- Network: ARY Digital Network
- Headquarters: Karachi, Sindh, Pakistan

Programming
- Languages: English; Urdu
- Picture format: (1080p, 16:9 MPEG-4 HDTV)

Ownership
- Owner: Salman Iqbal
- Parent: Karachi Kings
- Sister channels: ARY Digital UK; ARY News; A Sports; ARY Musik; ARY Qtv; ARY Zindagi; ARY Nick; ARY Zauq; ATN Urdu

History
- Launched: 16 September 2000; 26 years ago

Links
- Website: arydigital

Availability

Terrestrial
- Zuku TV (Kenya): Channel 939
- Medianet (Maldives): Channel 617
- Apstar 7: 4060 V 30000
- Laosat 1 (Laos): 10790 H 40000

Streaming media
- ARY Digital Live: Watch Live

ARY Digital HD (Urdu: ARY ڈیجیٹل) is a Pakistani television network available in Pakistan. ARY Digital was founded by a Dubai-based holding company of Pakistani businessman, Abdul Razzak Yaqoob and Salman Iqbal (ARY). The network broadcasts Pakistani entertainment dramas, sitcoms, talk shows, web series and culture.

The channel broadcasts on cable and satellite networks, linear television as well as streaming platforms including YouTube Channel and ARY Plus.

== History ==
ARY Digital, formerly known as The Pakistani Channel, was launched in the United Kingdom on 16th September 2000 to cater to the Pakistani community living in the region. It uses Samacom, an uplink provider based in the UAE, as the uplink teleport station. The channel started off with a format similar to PTV Prime and other South Asian channels where it provided slots for soap operas in general while presenting an hourly slot for news headlines. Although flaming political talk shows and dramas were the main priority when it came to programming, the network soon was hailed for its news coverage.

The network acquired a license to start broadcasting in Pakistan.

In 2002, the ARY Star Gold Quiz Show became the first live show to offer a prize of one kilogram of gold. For the period of its broadcast, participants won over 260 kilograms of gold.

former logo (2000–2009)

== Specialized programming ==
By 2003, ARY Digital had started up three sister ventures apart from the flagship channel ARY Digital, channels targeting generalized programming. They include ARY News, a news channel; ARY Musik, a youth-oriented music channel, and ARY Qtv, an Islamic network.

== Criticism ==
In 2003, ARY Digital was criticised upon its airing of a prisoner's derogatory comments against the Anti-Terrorism Court (ATC-3) and a video showing balded young girls behind bars begging for mercy. The contempt of court proceedings against the officials of the network were withdrawn after the judge accepted unconditional apologies.

== See also ==
- ARY Films
- List of Pakistani television series
- Television in Pakistan
- List of programs broadcast by ARY Digital
