= A Sports =

Pakistani Sports Channel

A Sports HD
- Pakistan's First HD Sports Channel
- Country: Pakistan
- Broadcast area: Pakistan and Worldwide
- Network: ARY Digital Network
- Headquarters: Karachi, Sindh, Pakistan

Programming
- Languages: Urdu, English
- Picture format: 1080i 16:9, MPEG-4, HDTV)

Ownership
- Owner: Salman Iqbal
- Parent: Karachi Kings
- Sister channels: ARY Digital; ARY News; ARY Musik; ARY Qtv

History
- Launched: 16 October 2021; 5 years ago
- Replaced: HBO

Links
- Website: a-sports.tv

A Sports HD is a Pakistani sports channel. It was launched on 16 October 2021 and is a part of ARY Digital Network which earlier planned it in 2016. On 9 October 2021, Wasim Akram, Waqar Younis, Wahab Riaz, Misbah ul Haq announced to join as its cricket analysts panel. In November 2022, it broadcast 2022 FIFA World Cup with exclusive pre & post match analysis shows.

== Programming ==
=== Current programming ===
- The Pavilion

== Coverage ==
=== Multi-event Sports ===
- 2028 Summer Olympics

=== International Cricket ===
Event	Period	Notes
ICC Men's T20 World Cup	2021; 2022	
ICC Under-19 Cricket World Cup	2022	
ICC Cricket World Cup	2023	

=== Association Football ===
Event	Period	Notes
FIFA World Cup	2022	
La Liga	2025-26	

=== Motorsport racing ===
Event	Period	Notes
Formula E	2024-present	

== See also ==
- List of Pakistani television stations
