= The Pavilion (cricket show) =

Pakistani cricket TV show

- Title screen
- Genre: Sports talk show, Cricket analysis
- Starring: Fakhar-e-Alam; Wasim Akram; Waqar Younis; Shoaib Malik; Misbah-ul-Haq; Moin Khan
- Country of origin: Pakistan
- Original languages: Urdu; English

Original release
- Network: A Sports
- Release: 16 October 2021 – present

The Pavilion is a Pakistani cricket TV show broadcast on A Sports since 2021. It airs primarily during major cricket tournaments and features a panel of former Pakistani cricketers, including Wasim Akram, Moin Khan, Shoaib Malik, and Misbah-ul-Haq, who share anecdotes about the sport.

The Pavilion has been particularly noted for its straightforward analysis and the absence of jingoism, making it a significant contributor to cricket-related discourse in the region.

== Cast ==
=== Host ===
- Fakhar-e-Alam

=== Analysts ===
- Wasim Akram
- Moin Khan
- Shoaib Malik
- Misbah-ul-Haq
- Azhar Ali
- Wahab Riaz
- Waqar Younis

== Reception ==
The show has gained unexpected popularity in India, attracting attention from cricketers Kapil Dev and Sourav Ganguly, and journalist Rajdeep Sardesai. Its format, which includes discussions in English, Urdu, and Punjabi, has facilitated its accessibility and appeal to a broader audience. Comparisons have been made between its cross-border success and that of Coke Studio, a Pakistani music program with a significant Indian following.
