= Haroon (singer) =

British Pakistani musician (born 1973)

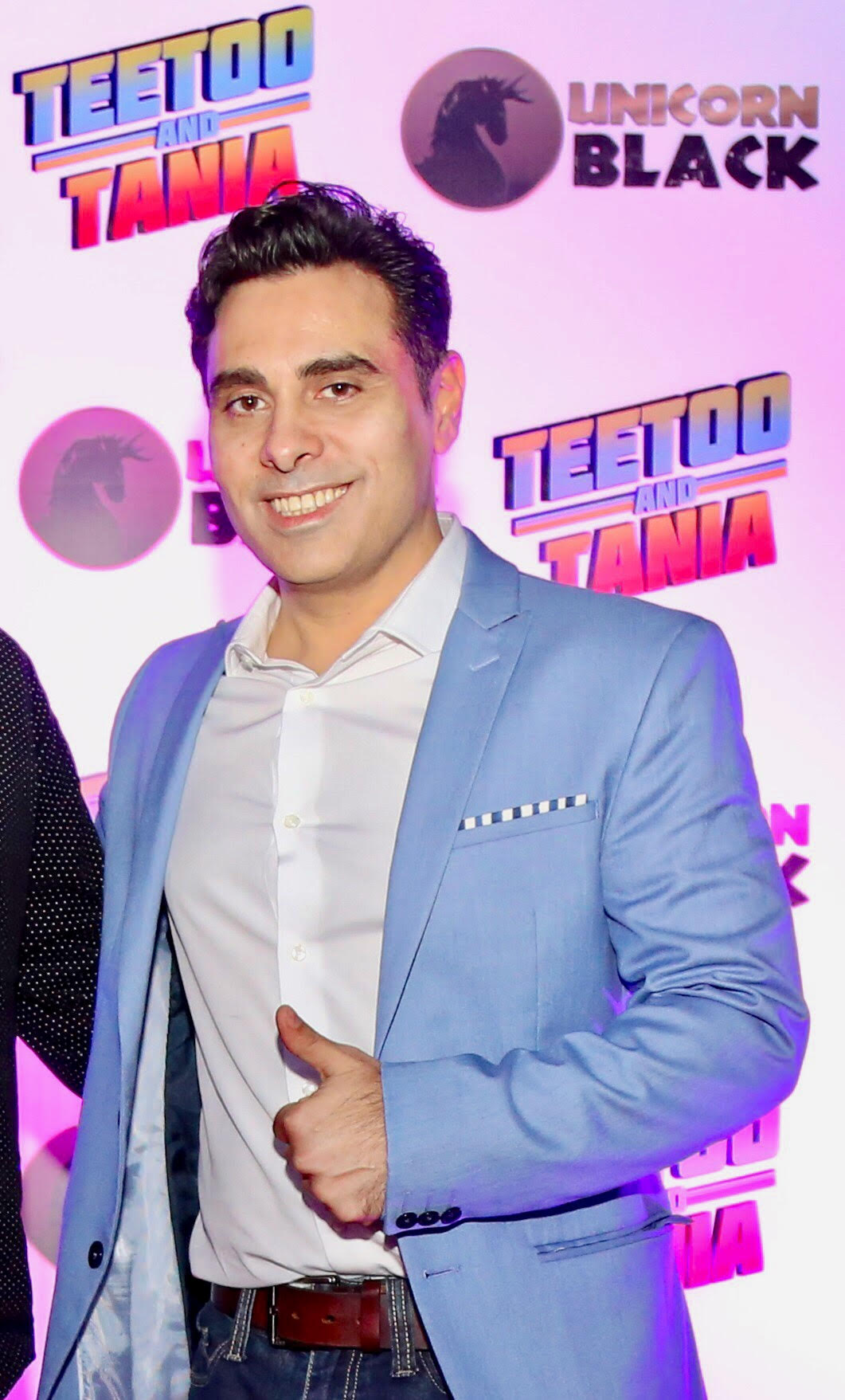
- Haroon in 2017 at Teetoo and Tania Launch Event at National Press Club

Background information
- Born: Aaron Haroon Rashid; 11 May 1973 (age 53)
- Genre: Pop
- Occupations: Singer; musician; composer; Director/Producer; Writer; CEO
- Instruments: Vocals; guitar; piano
- Years active: 1993 – present
- Labels: The Musik; Universal; Pepsi; EMI; Sony BMG
- Website: haroon.com

Aaron Haroon Rashid (Urdu: آرون ہارون راشد), known by the mononym Haroon, is a British-born Pakistani singer-songwriter, director, music producer and composer. He won a Peabody Award as a creator, director and producer for Burka Avenger.

Formerly a member of the pop band Awaz in the 1990s, Haroon as a solo artist has sold millions of singles and albums and has performed at Wembley Arena.

As the founding CEO of Unicorn Black, an animation production company, he is the creator and director of 3D animated television series Burka Avenger. His company produced Teetoo and Tania and developed the pilot for Quaid Say Baatein.

== Early life ==
Haroon was born in London, England, to a Pakistani-born father and New Zealand mother. His birth name is Aaron Haroon Rashid.

Haroon grew up and received his schooling at the American International School of Islamabad (ISOI) in Pakistan. His father died in 2017.

== Music career ==
=== Awaz ===
After graduating in the early 1990s with a degree in business administration from George Washington University, he formed the band Awaz with musician friends, Faakhir and Assad Ahmed.

Haroon and the band made a video of Janeman, a song which Haroon had composed when he was 16. He sent it to MTV Asia, and the song was the first Urdu and Pakistani song to air on the channel.

=== Solo career ===
Haroon's first career solo album, Haroon Ki Awaz, which he produced, engineered and recorded, was released in October 2000.

In 2001 and 2002, he toured the UK and US. In 2001, Haroon received the "Outstanding Contribution to Asian Music" award from the BBC Asia Awards show.

Haroon released his third solo album, Haroon Ka Nasha in March 2007, again composed, recorded, produced, engineered and mixed at his personal studio.

Haroon has produced songs and videos with socially conscious messages such as the anti-corruption song Mr. Fraudiay and Ghoom Ghoom which provided a message of interfaith harmony. He has sold over five million albums worldwide. He is also an audio engineer, having set up his own recording studio.

== Burka Avenger ==
Haroon is the creator and director of Burka Avenger, described as Pakistan's first full-length 3D animated television series for children. The series won the following awards:

S. No.	Awards / Accolades	Category	Result	Year
1	Peabody Award	N/A	Winner	2013
2	International Emmy Awards	Kids: Animation	Nominated	2015
3	Prix Jeunesse International	International Gender Equity Prize	Winner	2013
4	Asian Media Awards	Best TV Show	Winner	2014
5	Canada International Film Festival	Animation	Rising Star Award	2013
6	Accolades Global Film Festival	Viewer Impact: Content / Message Delivery	Award of Merit (Special Mention)	2014
7	LUMS International Film Festival	Animation	Winner	2014

Time magazine named Burka Avenger as one of the most influential characters of 2013. Haroon said he created the series as a way to emphasise the importance of girls' education in Pakistan and abroad, as well as issues such as equality and discrimination. The show features Jiya, an "inspirational school teacher" whose alter ego is a burka-wearing super-heroine that fights for justice, peace and education for all.

== Taazi.com ==
In 2015 Haroon launched Pakistan’s first digital content delivery platform called Taazi.com, which aimed to combat piracy. Taazi.co developed a mobile telecom integrated billing system, which allows users to pay via their mobile phone balances. Taazi.com was discontinued in 2020.

== Discography ==
=== Albums ===
- Haroon ki awaz (2001)
- Lagan (2003)
- Haroon Ka Nasha (2007)

=== Singles and videos ===
- "Janeman" (1994)
- "Diya" (1994)
- "Watan Kahani" (1993)
- "Jadoo Ka Chiragh" – with Awaz (1995)
- "Main Na Manoo Haar" – with Awaz (1996)
- "Mr. Fraudiay" – with Awaz (1996)
- "Aye Jawan" – with Awaz (1997)
- "Tu Hi Jeet" – with Awaz (1998)
- "Yara" – (2001)
- "Pyareya" (2001)
- "Jeekay Dekha" (2001)
- "Tu Hai Kahan" – with Vital Signs and Strings (2001)
- "Mehndi" (2002)
- "Mahbooba" (2002)
- "Dil Se" (2003)
- "Jao Tum" (2003)
- "Goriye" – Remix (2004)
- "Jiay Jaye" (2006)
- "Jua Khela" (2007)
- "Ishq Nasha" (2007)
- "Nahi Hai Yeh Pyar" (2008)
- "Big Corporation Man" (2009)
- "Ibtada-e-Ishq" (2009)
- "Nahin Hai' ft KOSTAL (2010)
- "Go Sabjee Go" (2010)
- "Ghoom Ghoom" (2011)
- "Lady in Black" with Adil Omar (2013)
- "Baba Bandook" with Ali Amzat (2013)
- "Dil Say Pakistan" with Muniba Mazari (2017)
- "Dhundoonga" – (2020)
- "Chha Jaa" with Aima Baig (2025)

== Personal life ==
Haroon married Farwa Hussain in June 2020 but they ended their marriage in 2021.
