= Geo Tez =

Pakistani television news channel

Geo Tez جیو تیز
- Country: Pakistan
- Network: Geo TV
- Headquarters: Karachi, Sindh, Pakistan

Programming
- Language: Urdu
- Picture format: 16:9 (1080i, HDTV)

Ownership
- Owner: Geo Television Network
- Sister channels: List: Geo Entertainment Geo News Geo Super Geo Kahani

History
- Launched: 11 May 2013
- Replaced: Geo English

Links
- Website: geotez.tv

Geo Tez (Urdu: جیو تیز) is an Urdu-language Pakistani pay television news channel that was launched in 2013 by GEO network. Its programming consists of headlines aired every fifteen minutes with a mix of entertainment programs acting as fillers.

Geo Tez premiered its first Urdu-language animated series, Burka Avenger, which would later become viral both on the Internet and on television. The channel broadcasts short stories, breaking news, headlines and documentaries. It replaced the defunct GEO English news channel, which closed down in October 2013.

Geo Tez was launched in the UK on Sky Digital in May 2013, and closed in August 2017, being replaced by Geo Kahani.

== Programmes ==
- Burka Avenger
- Team Muhafiz
- Doodh Patti Aur Khabar
- Tezabi Totay
- Quaid Say Baatein
- Repeats of Geo News programs
- Tez @ 7
