= Khawaja Akmal =

Pakistani actor (1948–2017)

- Born: Khawaja Akmal; 2 April 1948
- Died: 26 November 2017 (aged 69); Quetta, Pakistan
- Resting place: Khayaban e Muhafiz, Karachi, Pakistan
- Occupations: Actor, comedian
- Known for: Bulbulay (2009–2017)

Khawaja Akmal was a veteran Pakistani television actor and comedian who was mostly popular for playing comic roles in Pakistani sitcoms. His most notable role was playing Siddiqui Sahib (Khoobsoorat's father) in the sitcom Bulbulay (from 2009 to 2017). Other notable works included Rasgullay, Batashay and Samandar Hai Darmiyan. He died of a heart attack on 26 November 2017 in Quetta where he had gone to attend a wedding.
