= Karavan =

Pakistani rock band

- Karavan performing live in Karachi at Ramada Hotel.

Background information
- Origin: Karachi, Sindh, Pakistan
- Genres: Hard rock, Heavy metal
- Years active: 1997–2011; 2011–2012
- Labels: VCI Records, Sound Master, ARY Musik Records, Karavan Catalog Ltd
- Members: Asad Ahmed; Sameer Ahmed; Allan Smith; Tanseer Ahmed Daar
- Past members: Najam Sheraz

Karavan (Urdu: کاروان transl. Group of travelers) was a hard rock band hailing from Karachi, Sindh, Pakistan, formed in 1997.

The band was founded Asad Ahmed, former lead guitarist of Awaz, and bassist Sameer Ahmed. They were joined by drummer Allan Smith and vocalist Najam Sheraz. Karavan gained recognition for blending Eastern percussion and melodies with modern rock elements.

== History ==
=== Formation and early years (1997–2000) ===
Asad Ahmed started working on an untitled project with longtime friend and bassist Sameer Ahmed. In February 1997, after auditioning over fifty singers for their band, the duo approached Najam Sheraz, an already established mainstream solo artist. After listening to the tracks, he agreed to work on the album. Two months later, the trio made their national debut. Their first performance as a band, Karavan opened up for Nusrat Fateh Ali Khan at the Channel V concert.

Then the band started working on their debut album. In November, the band released their debut album, Rakh Aas. The band's first video premiere was banned by Pakistan Television Corporation (PTV) due to the band sporting long hair and clothing deemed outlandish. By the end of the year, drummer Allan Smith marked his first appearance with the band. Their first single video, "Rakh Aas", passed the censor board and was aired on PTV.

=== Gardish (2001–2003) ===
In February 2001, Karavan re-released Rakh Aas and later Safar with new covers and new tracks. In June, the band starts writing new material for their third album named, Gardish.

Then Karavan shot the video of the first single from their third album, "Aagey Hi Aagey". The band released Gardish in August. With the release of their third album, Karavan toured three major states in the US going to Houston, New York and Chicago in June 2003. By November, the band played at the UN World Food Program Show held in Islamabad. In December, Karavan released the second single from their third album, "Yeh Zindagi Hai", along with a video of the single.

=== Mainstream success (2004–2008) ===
On Independence Day, Karavan played at the unveiling of the largest national flag at the national stadium, sponsored by Shell Pakistan. In November, Pakistan Tobacco organised a rock fest with Karavan as headliners playing to a 2500-thousand-strong crowd in Islamabad. In December, the band was nominated for the "Best Live Act" at the 2005 Lux Style Awards.

In 2006, Shor video was released and was the fourth single released on their third album. In July, at the very first ARY Musik Awards, Karavan was nominated in four categories and Sameer won the Best Bassist Award. In December, Ufone launched Urock series of concerts across Pakistan to promote music and Karavan was one of the leading acts at these shows. In 2007, Karavan promoted their third album at the International Gardish tour and played at the Global Village Amphitheatre. Karavan then went on a tour of the encompassing interior cities of Punjab and Sindh.

In March 2008, Karavan played in front of a sold-out crowd at the Al Nasr Arena in Dubai. Karavan began writing songs for their fourth full-length studio album. Allan Smith and Sameer Ahmed lay down basic rhythm tracks.

=== Saara Jahan (2009–2010) ===
In March 2009, Karavan entered Shahzad "Shahi" Hassan's studios, the former Vital Signs man, to start working on the guitars and vocal tracks. By June to August the mixing of the tracks was finished, and the album is named Saara Jahan. In October, Karavan signs up with the ARY Musik Records.

On 15 May 2010, the line-up for Coke Studio confirmed Karavan would be featured in the third season. On 6 June 2010, the band performed "Yaadein" in Coke Studio third season's first episode, 'Reason'. On 18 July 2010, Karavan performed "Kaisay Mumkin Hai" in Coke Studio's third season's fourth episode 'Form'.

In 2011, Karavan performed at Rockstation concert held at Carlton Hotel, Karachi, Sindh. The concert was Karavan's last live performance. The band, during an interview with The Express Tribune newspaper announced their official break-up after 15 years. "We are done. Fifteen years is a big time period, and no more music will come with the current line-up," Asad told The Express Tribune. Adding to that, he said: "The break up is still very fresh. Let's just take it easy for a while and see what happens. I don't know with whom, but I will definitely make music."

=== Reunion (2012) ===
In 2012, the band reunited and performed for the last time at a concert at Carlton Hotel, Karachi after being in hibernation.

== Discography ==
Studio albums

- Rakh Aas (1997)
- Safar (1999)
- Gardish (2002) (album included their hit single Aagay Hi Aagay)
- Saara Jahan (2010)

Live albums

- Unplugged and Unleashed (2005)

== Band members ==
Final line-up

- Asad Ahmed – lead guitar (1997–2011)
- Sameer Ahmed – bass guitars (1997–2011)
- Allan Smith – drums (1997–2011)
- Tanseer Ahmed Daar – vocals, backing vocals (1999–2011)

Former

- Najam Sheraz – vocals (1997–1998)

== See also ==
- List of Pakistani music bands
