= Abdul Razzak Yaqoob =

Pakistani businessman (1944 – 2014)

- Born: 7 May 1944; Surat, Bombay Presidency, British India
- Died: 21 February 2014 (aged 69); London, United Kingdom
- Known for: Founder of ARY Digital Network
- Relatives: Salman Iqbal (nephew)

Abdul Razzak Yaqoob (7 May 1944 – 21 February 2014) was a Pakistani gold bullion trader who founded ARY Gold in the United Arab Emirates and later ARY Media Group.

== Early life ==
He was born in 1944 in Surat, British India to a Memon family, which migrated to Karachi after the partition of India.

== Business career ==
Yakoob moved to the United Arab Emirates in the 1960s and started a gold business with an outlet in Dubai. He founded ARY Group in 1972 and launched a private television channel, ARY Digital, in 2000.

He was associated with the ARY Gold bribery case in which he paid a bribe to then Prime Minister of Pakistan Benazir Bhutto to get exclusive rights to import and trade gold in Pakistan. In January 1994, Schlegelmilch established a British Virgin Island-based named Capricorn Trading, with Zardari as its owner. He was the head of the World Memon Organization (WMO).

== Philanthropy ==
He was a philanthropist and founded Khwaja Gharib Nawaz Welfare Trust International and Ehsaas Trust International.

== Death ==
He died on 21 February 2014 in London, United Kingdom.
