= ARY Digital Network =

- Life Connected
- Type: Subsidiary
- Industry: Mass media
- Founded: 16 September 2000; 25 years ago
- Founder: Haji Abdul Razzak Yaqoob; Salman Iqbal
- Headquarters: London, UK; Dubai, UAE; Karachi, Pakistan
- Area served: Worldwide
- Key people: Salman Iqbal (CEO/President)
- Products: TV channels; Magazines
- Owner: ARY Group
- Parent: ARY Digital network
- Subsidiaries: Karachi Kings

Ownership
- Sister channels: A Sports; ARY Digital; ARY News; ARY Musik; ARY Qtv
- Website: www.arydigitalnetwork.tv

ARY Digital Network (Urdu: ARY ڈیجیٹل شبکه) is a subsidiary of the ARY Group. The ARY group of companies is a Dubai-based holding company founded by a Pakistani businessman, Haji Abdul Razzak Yaqoob and Salman Iqbal (ARY). The network has a video on demand streaming service called ARY PLUS, formerly known as ARY ZAP.

== History ==
ARY Digital, formerly known as the Pakistani Channel, was launched in the United Kingdom in December 2000 to cater to the growing demands of South Asian entertainment in the region. It uses Samacom, a monopolising uplink provider based in the UAE, as the uplink teleport station.

=== Affiliate programming ===
Recently ARY Digital has affiliated with several other television networks to promote their content in Pakistan. Amongst these are Fashion TV for which a regional channel FTV Pakistan has been airing since December 2005 on the ARY Digital network. Plans are under way for Al Jazeera Urdu in affiliation with Al Jazeera targeting 110 million Urdu-speaking households worldwide and HBO Pakistan in association with HBO's south-Asian division. With the network's help, Nickelodeon is also planning to kick-start its operations in Nick Pakistan where it would be beamed into 2.5 million households with kids.

=== Channel list ===
ARY Digital Network is composed of the following channels:

- ARY Digital HD – HD Entertainment Channel for Asia Region
- A Sports HD Sports Channel
- ARY Zindagi HD – Infotainment Channel & Turkish drama Urdu dubbing
- ARY Musik HD – 24-hour Music
- ARY News HD – 24-hour Independent News
- ARY Qtv HD – Quran TV, Religious Content

International Channel List

- ARY Digital UK HD – Infotainment for UK Region
- ARY Family – Infotainment for UK Region
- Ary News New Vision TV HD – 24-hour Independent News for UK Region
- ARY Films – Film Distributing Company
- ARY Tube – Official Video Portal of ARY Digital Network
- ARY Arabia – YouTube channel presenting Pakistani dramas, OST's Arabic dubbed.

=== Over The Top (OTT) ===
- ARY Plus

=== Defunct channels ===
- ARY Zauq
- ATN ARY Digital
- The Musik
- VH1 Pakistan
- Fashion TV Pakistan
- HBO Pakistan
- QTV
- ARY Sahulat Bazar
- Nickelodeon Pakistan
- ARY TECH
- ARY Zap

== ARY films ==
ARY Films is film distribution company running in Pakistan. It's a part of ARY Digital Network. Thirty five films including 11 Urdu, 6 Punjabi and 17 Pashto films were released by ARY Films in 2013. Among them Waar, Main Hoon Shahid Afridi, Josh, Chambaili, Zinda Bhaag, Siyaah and Lamha top the charts in industry.

== ARY Media Advisory Board ==
At the turn of events leading to the emergency in December 2007, Salman Iqbal, CEO of the network announced along with the ARY Digital network committee the establishment of a media advisory board, the purpose of which would be to assess the media coverage (be it news or other programmes) on the network. Saying that ARY Digital has been reporting without bias for a while but the recent events ushering the emergency rule and temporary closure of one of the biggest news network Geo TV, ARY Digital required a better unbiased coverage. He concluded that an array of government leaders could weigh the coverage presented by the network on the basis of its rationality and coverage so that the media portrayed by the network was in verse with the way Pakistan is supposed to be imaged. The board would have seats for 20 members, each focusing on different aspects of media would provide their views on how media should be portrayed.

== Criticism ==
For a brief period in 2003, ARY Digital received criticism upon its airing of a prisoner's derogatory comments against the Anti-Terrorism Court (ATC-3) and a video showing balded young girls behind bars begging for mercy. The contempt of court proceedings against the officials of the network were withdrawn after the judge accepted unconditional apologies.

An attempted takeover of BOL Network and BOL News took place in August 2015, carried out by ARY Digital Network CEO Salman Iqbal, who said that the decision was taken in view to provide career protection to media industry and its workers. ARY Group founder Salman Iqbal said that his media group would launch the transmission of the channel within three weeks. However this deal fell through and in September 2015 it was announced that ARY was not taking over BOL.

== See also ==
- ATN ARY Digital (Canada)
- ARY News
- ARY Films
- List of Pakistani television serials
- List of Pakistani television stations
- ARY Qtv
- List of programs broadcast by ARY Digital
