= Quaid Say Baatein =

- Genre: Kids Show
- Created by: Daniyal Noorani
- Starring: Mahnoor Waseem as Zainab
- Country of origin: Pakistan
- Original language: Urdu
- No. of seasons: 2

Production
- Executive producer: Daniyal Noorani
- Producer: Wakhra Studios
- Production location: Pakistan
- Running time: 2-3 minutes

Original release
- Network: Geo Tez
- Release: 2013 – 2020

Quaid Say Baatain is a Pakistani animated series about a young girl named Zainab, who is always thinking of ways to help and improve Pakistan. In each episode, she encounters a problem, which she then tries to solve by recalling the words and actions of Pakistan's founder, the Quaid-e-Azam. The show was aimed at presenting a role model to the Pakistani children.

The show spread special messages among the youth. In one episode, it conveyed the message of spreading peace and protecting Pakistan following the 2014 Peshawar school massacre.
