= Faakhir Mehmood =

Pakistani musician

Faakhir Mehmood فاخر محمود
- Also known as: Faakhir
- Born: Faakhir Mehmood; 20 April 1973 (age 53); Rawalpindi, Pakistan
- Origin: Islamabad, Pakistan
- Genres: Pop
- Occupations: Singer; musician; music composer
- Instruments: Vocals; keyboard
- Years active: 1992–present
- Labels: T-series, Hi-Tech Music, Fire Records, Universal Music India, Tips Music
- Spouse: Mehreen Faakhir (2000–2025)
- Children: Simone Faakhir, Naael Faakhir
- Awards: Sitara-i-Imtiaz (2024), Pride of Performance (2007), Sahara Sangeet Awards (2005)

Signature
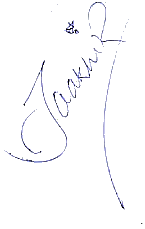

Faakhir Mehmood (Urdu: فاخر محمود; born 20 April 1973) is a Pakistani singer, keyboardist, composer and music producer. He started out his career with the Pakistani musical group Awaz in 1992. Awaz disbanded in 2000 and its members went on to pursue solo careers. The band also consisted of well known musician Haroon.

== Early life and education ==
Faakhir was born on 20 April 1973 in Rawalpindi. He attended the University of Engineering and Technology, Taxila, earning a bachelor's degree in Electrical Engineering. His earliest exposure to music was when he purchased an harmonica at the age of 8.

== Music career ==
=== Awaz (1992–2000) ===
During his university years, Faakhir met another young singer, Haroon. Together, they formed the band Awaz in 1992. Faakhir joined the band as a keyboardist and Asad Ahmed as a guitarist.

=== Solo career (2000–present) ===
After the band split in 2000, Faakhir embarked on a solo career. Faakhir started working on his album Aatish in July 2000 by releasing his first single in August, a national song "Dil Na Lagay, Pakistan". After deciding to go solo, Faakhir started work on his debut album, Aatish, which was released in 2002. He followed it up with Sub Tun Sohniyeh in 2003, and Mantra in 2005. The music video of his song "Dilruba", shot in Spain, was reportedly the most expensive music video back then.

In Mantra, there is a song called "Jiya Na Jaye", in which Faakhir shares a duet with Indian singer Sunidhi Chauhan. Another song in that album called "Mahi Ve" won two awards at India's Sangeet Natak Akademi Awards. He also performed at that event.

In 2011, he released his fourth solo album, Jee Chahay. Ali Ather of Views Craze wrote, "Although not better than Faakhir's previous works Jee chahay the album composed and produced by Faakhir himself comes out to be a pretty decent effort." Rafay Mehmood of Express Tribune said, "Even though Jee Chahay, which comprises 10 songs, might not come close to his previous offering Mantra, which was released in 2005, it still manages to give the listener some tunes worth humming."

In 2016, Faakhir featured in Coke Studio as a singer with "Dilruba Na Raazi", a Pashto traditional folk song, which he sang along with Zeb Bangash. He then appeared with Natasha Khan and performed "Dil Kamla".

==== Production ====
Trained as an electrical engineer, Faakhir has cited this background as influencing his interest in electronic equipment and audio technology, leading him to establish a recording studio, TwentyFourSeven, in Karachi. He has continued to upgrade the studio’s technical capabilities, which undertakes projects for artists, record labels, television and film productions, and advertising agencies. His compositions have also been used in commercial advertising campaigns, including work associated with music groups.

In 2015, he was one of the producers who worked on the soundtrack for the Pakistani movie Ho Mann Jahaan.

In 2016, Faakhir served as one of the six music directors for season 9 of Coke Studio Pakistan. He directed the new version of Nusrat Fateh Ali Khan's "Afreen Afreen". Rahat Fateh Ali Khan and Momina Mustehsan rendered their voices for the song.

==== Concerts and performances ====
Faakhir's live shows have taken his music to many countries in the world including the United States, Europe, the Middle East and Asia, in addition to all parts of Pakistan.

Faakhir has performed alongside several international contemporaries from Europe including Sukhbir and Stereo Nation to name a few.

== Other work ==
In 2017, Faakhir Mehmood made some comments on social issues that were newsworthy and were given news coverage by a major newspaper of Pakistan. In the past, Faakhir has served as the UN Goodwill Ambassador for the World Health Organization.

== Awards ==
- Pride of Performance Award by the President of Pakistan in 2007
- Lux Style Awards: Best Song ("Kabhi Kabhi Pyar Mein") in 2010
- Hum Awards: Best Music Video ("Baliya") Won
- 2015: 3rd Hum Awards: Best Music Single

== Discography ==
=== Solo albums ===
- Aatish (2002)
- Sub Tun Sohniyeh (2003)
- Mantra (2005)
- Jee Chaahey (2011). It was composed and produced by the singer. The album was recorded at Shani's studio with lyrics by Sabir Zafar and Indian poet Prashant Vasal, and was released through Fire Records. Track listing :

- "Allah Karay" (with Mahnoor Baloch Featuring Mikaal Zulfiqar)
- "Atom Bomb"
- "Baylia"
- "Jee Chahay"
- "Kho Jaon" featuring Meera (Veet Miss Super Model Contest Season 3)
- "Maula"
- "Mitti Pao"
- "O Sheeday"
- "Parwah"
- "Shikva"

=== TV commercials ===
- Nestle Everyday
- Boomer
- Telenor Pakistan
- United Bank Limited

=== Soundtracks ===
- Ek Wari
- Tum Meri Ho
- Dolly Darling
- Salam Zindagi

== See also ==
- Awaz
- Haroon (singer)
- Asad Ahmed
