= Live at Get Your Aunty On! =

Live album by Aunty Disco Project
- Released: August 16, 2009
- Recorded: August 16, 2009 at Rangoonwala Auditorium in Karachi, Pakistan
- Genre: Indie rock, Alternative rock, Pop rock
- Length: 25:56
- Label: Independent
- Producer: Omar Bilal Akhtar

Aunty Disco Project chronology
MTV Unplugged (2009)	Live at Get Your Aunty On! (2009)	Kisi Aur Ka Intezaar Hai (2011)

Live at Get Your Aunty On! is the second live album and overall the third album by the Pakistani indie rock band, Aunty Disco Project, released on August 16, 2009. It is exclusively a digital download live album, and has not been released on a physical medium. The album included recordings from the band's live performances at Get Your Aunty On! concert at Rangoonwala Auditorium held in Karachi, Sindh.

== Track listing ==
All music written, composed & arranged by Aunty Disco Project. "Rock the Casbah" was originally recorded by The Clash.

Live at Get Your Aunty On!
No.	Title	Length
1.	"Janay Walay"	3:37
2.	"Likhta Nahin Main"	3:55
3.	"Mujhay Sahara Do"	7:20
4.	"Nazar"	4:31
5.	"Raat Jaagi"	2:32
6.	"Rock the Casbah"	3:57
Total length:		25:56

== Personnel ==
All information is taken from the CD.

Aunty Disco Project

- Omar Bilal Akhtar - vocals, lead guitar
- Giles Goveas - drums
- Ali Alam - vocals, rhythm guitar
- Rahail Siddiqui - bass, backing vocals

Production

- Produced by Aunty Disco Project
- Recorded & Mixed at Rangoonwala Auditorium in Karachi, Pakistan
