= ARY Qtv =

Pakistani television channel

ARY Qtv HD
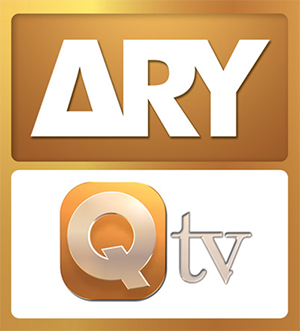
- Country: Pakistan
- Broadcast area: Pakistan and Worldwide
- Network: ARY Digital Network
- Headquarters: Karachi, Sindh, Pakistan

Programming
- Language(s): Urdu; English
- Picture format: 1080i, 16:9 MPEG-4, HDTV)

Ownership
- Owner: Salman Iqbal
- Parent: Karachi Kings
- Sister channels: ARY Digital; ARY News; ARY Zindagi; A Sports

History
- Launched: October 28, 2003; 21 years ago
- Former names: QTV

Links
- Website: www.aryqtv.tv

Availability

Terrestrial
- VAST (Australia): Channel 12
- Zuku TV (Kenya): Channel 947

Streaming media
- ARY Qtv Live: Watch live

ARY QTV HD, formerly known as Quran Television (QTV), is a Pakistani television channel with a Sunni Islam belief, that produces programs mainly having focus on the Ahlesunnat wal Jamaat. QTV is part of the ARY Digital Network of Pakistan.

The channel has shows featuring well-known scholars such as Pir Muhammad Alauddin Siddiqui, Saqib Iqbal Shami, Muhammad Raza Saqib Mustafai, Shaykh Hassan Haseeb Ur Rehman, Dr. Muhammad Aamir Liaquat Hussain, Dr. Umar Al-Qadri, Mufti Abu Baqr, Mufti Muhammad Akmal, Mufti Shahid, Mufti Sohail Raza Amjadi, Mufti Muhammad Aamir, Muhammad Ajmal Raza Qadri, and Amjad Sabri. Other shows include Qur'an teachings, hadith, talk shows, question-and-answer shows, Qawwali music and Na`at poetry.

Former QTV logo used until May 2009

== International Availability ==
In 2023, the channel relaunched in the United Kingdom as QTV on Sky channel 761.

== See also ==
- Madani Channel
- Islam Channel
