= Najam Sheraz =

Pakistani pop singer and songwriter

- Born: Najam Sheraz; 2 August 1969 (age 57); Multan, Punjab, Pakistan
- Genres: Spiritual
- Years active: 1994–present
- Formerly of: Karavan (1997-1998)

Najam Sheraz (Urdu: نجم شیراز) is a Pakistani pop singer and songwriter.

== Early life and education ==
Najam Sheraz was born in Multan, Pakistan on 2 August 1969. He played professional cricket with future national players including captains of the Pakistan national cricket team Inzamam-ul-Haq and Waqar Younis. He graduated from the University of Engineering and Technology, Lahore in civil engineering.

He has trained under Baba Chahat Hussain, who has played the sarangi for Lata Mangeshkar.

== Music career ==
He formed his first band with his elder brothers Bobby (Dr. Zubair Adnan) and Joji (Salman Nadeem) called Brother Rhythm when he was 14, while his first band as an adult, Wet Metal, was influenced by Guns 'N' Roses and Bruce Springsteen. He attained commercial and critical success with hit singles like In Se Nain, and Eik Larki. His first Urdu Hamd Na Tera Khuda Koi Aur Hai (Yeh Moamla Koi Aur Hai) was popular.

His Punjabi song Mainu Tere Naal, released in 2000, inspired the song Bheege Hont Tere in the 2004 Bollywood movie Murder. However, Sheraz remained on good terms with the movie's producer, Mahesh Bhatt, and they eventually collaborated for the film Shaapit (2010).

His global peace song Only Love was selected by International Olympics Committee for the 2008 Beijing Olympics Torch Relay in Islamabad.

== Discography ==
=== Solo albums ===
Year	Title	Label
1999	Pal Do Pal	OSA
2002	Jaisay Chaho Jiyo	OSA
2003	Yeh Moamla Koi Aur Hai	OSA
2004	Mainu Tere Naal	OSA
2006	Maula Tu Rab Rehman Hai	OSA

== Awards ==
Year	Award Ceremony	Category	Film	Song	Result	Reference(s)
2010	Mirchi Music Awards	Upcoming Male Vocalist of The Year	Shaapit	"Tere Bina Jiya Na Jaye"	Nominated	
