= Salman Iqbal =

Pakistani media mogul

Salman Iqbal SI
- سلمان اِقبال
- Born: Dubai, United Arab Emirates
- Occupation: Media mogul
- Known for: President and CEO of the ARY Digital Network; Owner of Karachi Kings
- Relatives: Abdul Razzak Yaqoob (uncle)

Salman Iqbal (Urdu: سلمان اِقبال) is a Pakistani media mogul. He became the CEO of ARY Digital Network and ARY Group in 2014 after the death of his uncle Abdul Razzak Yaqoob who was the publisher of Newsweek Middle East.

Iqbal is the owner of the PSL team Karachi Kings. In 2017, he was listed among the 500 Most Influential Muslims.

== Awards ==
Year	Award	Category	Result	Note	Ref.
2022	Sitara-i-Imtiaz	Sports	Won	Awarded by Arif Alvi, President of Pakistan	
