= Wooly and the Uke =

Pakistani musician

Wooly Aziz
- Born: Jannat Sohail; 17 December 1993 (age 32); Lahore, Pakistan
- Genres: Indie pop; electro pop; indie folk; art pop; folk; synth-pop
- Occupations: Singer; songwriter; audio-visual artist
- Instruments: Vocals; ukulele; guitar; keyboards
- Years active: 2013–present
- Label: Rearts Records
- Website: woolyandtheuke.com

Jannat Sohail (English: /ˈjɑːnɑːt ˈsɒhæɪl/, Urdu: جنت سہیل, born 17 December 1993), known professionally as Wooly Aziz, and previously known as Wooly and the Uke is a Pakistani, singer, songwriter, and audio-visual artist based in Berlin. Born and raised in Lahore, she rose to fame when she became part of an all-female ensemble on Nescafé Basement fourth season, a Pakistani music television series, produced by Zulfiqar Jabbar Khan in 2016.

She released her debut single "Circus" in 2017, which writer Abdul-Rehman Malik reported saying, "it’s one hell of a debut" and was named by Beehype as one of the best tracks from Pakistan of 2017. Critically acclaimed, the music video of "Circus" was directed by renowned music directors Hamza Bin Tahir and Awais Gohar. In 2020, her Poor Rich Boy collaboration "Watch" and solo release "Circle in Circle" made her to be recognised by shesaid.so collective Alternative Power 100 Music List 2020, and achieved Pop-Kultur residency by Goethe-Institut. Wooly and the Uke is known for her compositions flow and indie folk lyrics, which have received widespread media coverage, with The News International describing it as "an oscillating part retro, part indie" music.

== Early life ==
Jannat Sohail was born on December 17, 1993, in Lahore, Pakistan. She started writing lyrics at a very young age and her music evolved with her ongoing interactions with people around her. She did her first performance when she was doing her A Levels studies and started to perform since then. In 2016, Aziz developed the stage name "Wooly and the Uke" after her performance at the Pakistani television music series Nescafé Basement fourth season, produced by Zulfiqar Jabbar Khan. Being part of the first all-female ensemble at Nescafé Basement, her performance of John Newman's single "Love Me Again" at the Pakistani music television series prompted John Newman to tweet and praise her band's performance, saying "this is sooo dope! thank you!!". Aziz in an interview with Alt Muslimah said being part of Pakistan's first all-girls ensemble "one would think that Pakistan’s first all-girls ensemble would have faced numerous obstacles, but it was quite the opposite." The song was critically acclaimed and Aziz's performance was highly lauded by Ali Azmat and Junaid Khan, vocalist of the Pakistani rock band Call. She attended National College of Arts at the Department of Architecture, a public university in Lahore, Pakistan.

== Career ==
=== 2017–2019: Career beginnings ===
In 2017, Wooly and the Uke released her debut song "Circus", produced by Jamal Rahman. In an interview with The News International, Aziz talked about the song saying, "for me it is a satirical comment on society, consumerism and not being able to get out of it". The Revue compared her debut single composition to Laura Marling and Marissa Nadler music and reported that "her new single is as beautiful and stunning as anything these indie stars have released."

== Discography ==
=== Singles ===
- "Circus" – Rearts Records (2017)
- "Circus (Remix)" – Rearts Records (2019)
- "Watch" (split single with the Pakistan band Poor Rich Boy) – (2020)
- "Circle in a Circle" – (2020)
- "Home" – (2021)
- "How" (split single with John Mark Nelson) – (2022)
- "These Days" (split single with Glitch Bird) – (2022)

== See also ==
- Nescafé Basement
