= Dhoom (Call album) =

Studio album by Call
- Released: 26 January 2011
- Recorded: 2007–2011
- Studios: Xth Harmonic Studio in Lahore, Pakistan
- Genre: Pop rock
- Length: 56:17
- Label: Fire Records
- Producer: Zulfiqar J. Khan

Call chronology
| Jilawatan (2005) | Dhoom (2011) |

Singles from Dhoom
- 1. "Aasmaan" Released: 9 September 2007; 2. "Humse Hai Ye Zamana" Released: 20 September 2007; 3. "Laree Chootee" Released: 21 May 2008; 4. "Yeh Pal" Released: 9 January 2009; 5. "Ho Jaane De" Released: 11 February 2009; 6. "Dharkay Jiya" Released: 13 March 2009; 7. "Mein Aisa He Hoon" Released: 26 January 2011

External audio
- Jukebox playlist on YouTube

Dhoom (Urdu: دھوم, literal English translation: "blast") is the second studio album by the Pakistani rock band Call, released in January 2011. The album included the singles "Laree Chootee" (from Ek Chalis Ki Last Local), "Yeh Pal" (from Aasma: The Sky Is the Limit) and "Dharkay Jiya" (from Aloo Chaat) which featured in several Bollywood movies as soundtracks. The album also included the patriotic songs "Humse Hai Ye Zamana" and "Aasmaan".

== Background ==
In 2007, although Call had not yet announced the release of their second album, the band had released several songs on their fan site. The first single released was "Laree Chotee" which featured on the soundtrack of the Bollywood movie Ek Chalis Ki Last Local, with an accompanying music video. The song was remixed and arranged by DJ Suketu & Aks. In late 2007, prior to the 2007 Cricket World Cup, Call recorded and made a video for a song entitled "Humse Hai Ye Zamana". This was to be the official song for the Pakistan cricket team during the tournament. However, due to the team's early World Cup exit, the song was held back for a future release. On 20 September, Call released the music video and put it up for download on their official website.

Call also released three critically acclaimed hit singles; "Ho Jaane De", "Yeh Pal" and "Dharkay Jiya", the latter two being tapped into by Bollywood for the soundtracks of two different movies, which topped the charts and received positive reviews. The single "Ho Jaane De" was widely appreciated throughout the subcontinent, but was criticised by some as the pop-oriented song was a departure from the band's hard rock image. The song was awarded the 'Tune Of The Month' by BBC Asia and was also used in the Wall's ice cream advertisement, for which the band members have also modeled.

== Track listing ==
All songs composed and arranged by Call. All songs written by Zulfiqar J. Khan, except where noted.

Dhoom
| No. | Title | Writer(s) | Length |
|---|---|---|---|
| 1. | "Dhoom" | Sami, Zulfiqar J. Khan | 3:48 |
| 2. | "Mein Aisa He Hoon" | | 4:31 |
| 3. | "Rung Do" | Junaid Khan, Zulfiqar J. Khan | 5:45 |
| 4. | "Yeh Pal" | | 5:29 |
| 5. | "Ho Jaane De" | Aleezay Khan | 3:39 |
| 6. | "Dharkay Jiya" | Sami, Zulfiqar J. Khan | 4:40 |
| 7. | "Humse Hai Ye Zamana" | | 4:03 |
| 8. | "Kyun" | | 5:51 |
| 9. | "Abhi Dair Hai" | | 6:38 |
| 10. | "Teri Haar Hum" | | 3:26 |
| 11. | "Laree Chootee" | Syed Quadri, Zulfiqar J. Khan | 3:59 |
| 12. | "Aasmaan" | | 4:22 |
| Total length: | | | 56:17 |

== Personnel ==
Call

- Junaid Khan - lead vocals
- Zulfiqar J. Khan - lead guitar, bass guitar, backing vocals
- Sultan Raja - bass guitars

Production

- Produced by Zulfiqar J. Khan
- Recorded & Mixed at Xth Harmonic Studio in Lahore, Pakistan
- Assisted by Zulfiqar J. Khan

== Critical reception ==
Dhoom has received positive reviews. Koolmuzone called the album, a treat to listen to. Shahzeb Sheikh of Instep magazine gave the album 5 out of 5 stars and said: Dhoom might just be the revival of quality production in the Pakistani music domain. Dawn| also gave a positive review saying that Dhoom has a definite mainstream presence as Call's rock influence is ubiquitous throughout.

== Awards and nominations ==
Dhoom was nominated for Best Album in Lux Style Awards 2012.
