= Leo Twins =

Pakistani musicians

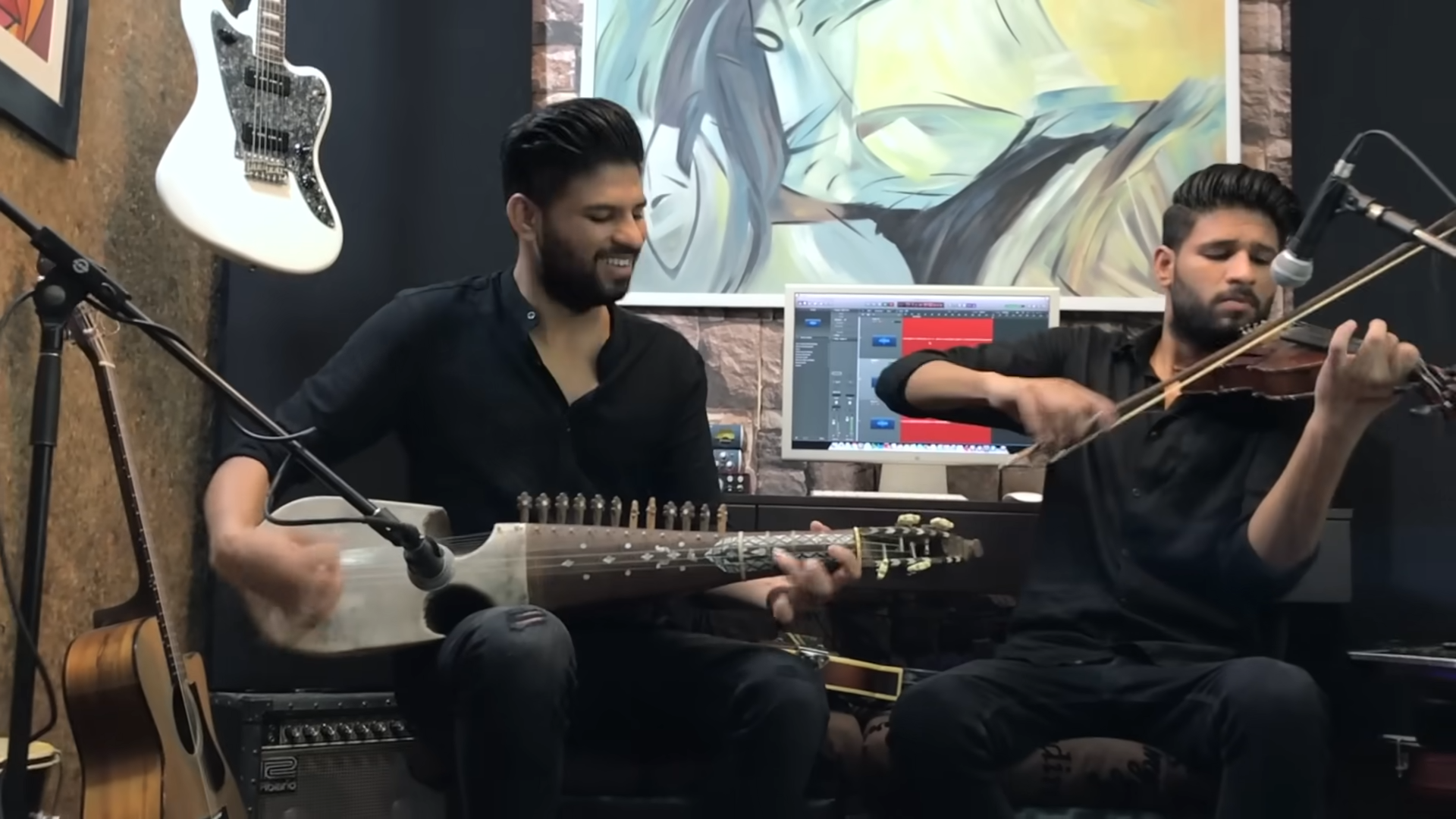
- The Leo Twins playing music from Diriliş: Ertuğrul

Background information
- Born: July 27, 1993 (age 32)
- Genres: Instrumental, world music, pop, rock, gospel, eastern classical
- Instrument(s): Sharoon: Violin, Cello - Haroon: Guitar, Percussions, Piano
- Members: Haroon Leo; Sharoon Leo

Haroon and Sharoon Leo (born 27 July 1993), professionally known as Leo Twins, are Pakistani musicians and multi-instrumentalists. The Leo Twins began their career on the popular TV show Nescafé Basement where they became a regular part of the house band under the production of Zulfiqar Jabbar Khan.

== Life and career ==
Born in Rawalpindi to a Christian family, the Leo Twins studied at the Punjab College of Information Technology. They started their career from Nescafe Basement Season 3. Sharoon, the elder of the twins, plays violin and cello while Haroon plays more than 10 instruments including guitar, rubab, tabla, piano, cajon, ukulele, mandolin, darbuka, and other percussion instruments. Leo Twins actively release instrumental covers and originals on their YouTube Channel. Haroon Leo and Sharoon Leo also play with some of the renowned names in the music fraternity such as Atif Aslam, Meesha Shafi, Call (band), Momina Mustehsan and Rahat Fateh Ali Khan. They were also a part of Pakistan Super League team Peshawar Zalmi's team anthem Hum Zalmi. Leo Twins' version of Diriliş: Ertuğrul soundtrack proved to be an instant hit and gained viewership from all over the world.

== Discography ==
=== Nescafe Basement ===
- Season 3
- Mein Hoon - Season 4
- Season 5

=== Singles & covers ===
- Sayonee (Cover)
- Despacito
- National Anthem
- Tu Hi Dua
- Shape Of You - Ed Sheeran (Cover)
- Kalvari De Saharay
- Ko Ko Korina - Cover
- Ertugrul Ghazi (Soundtrack)
- Game of Thrones (Soundtrack)
- Sanson Ki Mala
- Aadat by Atif Aslam
- Ap se mil ke hum feat. Zeeshan Ali
