= Kahan Hai Tu =

2003 Pakistani single by Entity Paradigm

Single by Entity Paradigm

from the album Irtiqa
- Released: 2003
- Recorded: 2002
- Genre: Alternative rock, hard rock
- Length: 4:14 (album version)
- Label: Lips Records
- Songwriters: Ahmed Ali Butt, Zulfiqar J. Khan
- Producers: Zulfiqar J. Khan, Fawad A. Khan, Mekaal Hasan

Entity Paradigm singles chronology
"Hamein Aazma" (2003)	"Kahan Hai Tu" (2003)	"Hamesha" (2004)

"Kahan Hai Tu" (Urdu: کہاں ہے تو, literal English translation: "where are you?") is a rock-influenced single by the Pakistani rock band Entity Paradigm from their debut album, Irtiqa. The single was released in 2003, and is the third single from the band's debut album. The song is written by band members, Ahmed Ali Butt and Zulfiqar J. Khan.

The song is similar to "Hamein Aazma" as far as the beginning is concerned but then the track unfold its own unique blend of heavy guitar notes and drums.

== Music video ==
The videos starts off with whole band walking and then the whole band is seen performing and head-banging at a concert. In the end, they are again seen walking.

== Track listing ==
Kahan Hai Tu

All tracks are written by Entity Paradigm.

No.	Title	Length
1.	"Kahan Hai Tu"	4:14
