= Havi (Abdur Rahman Sajid) =

- Born: Abdur Rahman Sajid; 28 September 1997 (age 29); Karachi, Pakistan
- Musical career
- Genres: Alternative Rock; Pop
- Occupations: Singer; Song Writer; Actor
- Instrument: Vocals
- Years active: 2018–present

Havi (Abdur Rehman Sajid) is a Pakistani singer-songwriter and actor. He first gained recognition as the lead vocalist of Auj, which won Pepsi Battle of the Bands in 2019. He left the band in September 2024 to pursue a solo career. In May 2026, he made his acting debut in the Eid-ul-Adha telefilm Rishta Pakka, broadcast on ARY Digital. In July 2026, Spotify selected him as its RADAR Pakistan artist for the third quarter of the year.

== Career ==
=== 2019–2024: Auj and early recognition ===
Sajid came to prominence as the vocalist of Auj, a Pakistani music band that won Pepsi Battle of the Bands in 2019. During his association with the group, he contributed to songs including "Lafz" and "Aansu".

In September 2024, he began working as a solo artist. In an interview with Geo News, Sajid described his departure from Auj as a mutual professional decision, explaining that the members had different musical ambitions and creative approaches. He also said that working independently gave him greater control over his music.

=== 2024–present: Solo career ===
As a solo performer, Sajid released music under the stage name Havi. His solo work includes songs such as "Na Milay", "Duhrao" and "Farz". His music has also attracted attention through performances and renditions of older songs, including material associated with Pakistani singer Nusrat Fateh Ali Khan.

In October 2025, he discussed his musical influences and creative approach in an interview with The News International. He described music as a means of self-analysis and said that his work draws on a range of inspirations.

In July 2026, Spotify selected Havi as its RADAR Pakistan artist for the third quarter of the year. According to figures reported by the platform, his Spotify audience had increased by more than 335 percent over the preceding year, while streams of his music had grown by more than 200 percent. His songs had also been added to more than 200,000 user-generated playlists. The programme included plans for a mini-documentary about his musical journey and creative process.

=== Acting ===
In May 2026, Sajid made his acting debut in the Eid-ul-Adha telefilm Rishta Pakka, broadcast on ARY Digital. The project was directed by Abdullah Abid Malik and also featured Fatima Amjad, Dania Enwer and Saqib Sumeer.

== Discography ==
Year	Song	Notes	Ref(s)
2023	"Abyss"	Single	
2024	"Andaz E Karam"	Collaboration with Farasat Anees	
2025	"Na Milay"	Collaboration with Afifa Moin; featured in ''Nescafé Basement'' season 6	
2025	"Moon"	Single	
2025	"Farz"	Collaboration with Farasat Anees	
2025	"Saat Din"	Single	
2025	Nazre Karam	Rap Single	
2025	"Rung"	Collaboration with DJ Abdur and Farasat Anees	
2026	"Hum"	Collaboration with Farasat Anees	
2026	"Dil Sukoon"	Collaboration with Third Fret	
