= Junaid Khan (Pakistani actor) =

Pakistani actor and singer (born 1981)

- جنید خان
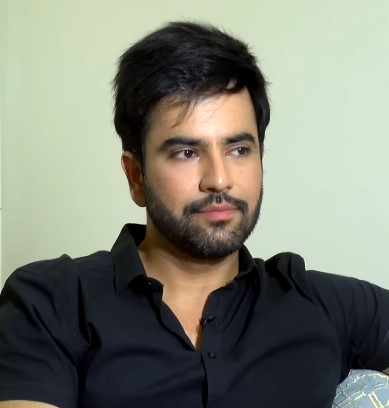
- Junaid Khan in 2020
- Born: Junaid Khan Niazi; 2 November 1981 (age 45); Multan, Punjab, Pakistan
- Occupations: Actor; producer; singer-songwriter
- Years active: 2003–present
- Height: 1.79 m (5 ft 10 in)
- Musical career
- Origin: Lahore, Pakistan
- Genre: Rock
- Instruments: Vocals; guitar
- Website: junaidkhanofficial.com

Junaid Khan (born as Junaid Khan Niazi 2 November 1981) is a Pakistani actor, producer and singer-songwriter.

Since the early 2000s Khan is the lead vocalist of the Lahore-based rock band Call, which has released two commercially successful albums, Jilawatan (2005) and Dhoom (2011).

As an actor he is best known for his roles in serials Sun Yaara (2017), Ishq Tamasha (2018) and Yaariyan (2019). He rose to fame by portraying the sophisticated Dr. Talal Sikandar in the 2017 hit drama Sun Yaara on ARY Digital.

In 2012 Khan was nominated at the Lux Style Awards in two different categories Best TV Actor for the serial Dil Ki Lagi and Best Album of the Year for the album Dhoom.

In 2022 he turned producer with Jeem Films, a production house and company he considers to be a platform to promote new talent.

== Early life and education ==
Junaid Khan Niazi was born on 2 November 1981 to a Muslim family of Pashtun (Niazi) descent in Multan, Punjab, Pakistan. His paternal family was based in Jalandhar (now Punjab, India) before the 1947 partition.

Khan completed his early education (grades 1 to 5) from Divisional Public School and from Ibne Sina College Defence (Matric). After completing Matric, he joined FC College and later joined Mining Engineering Department of UET Lahore to pursue a degree in engineering. During his third year at UET, while still being a student, Khan started his musical career. He was auditioned by former Call members and was chosen to be part of the band. Later Khan earned his Master of Business Administration (MBA) degree from Imperial College in Lahore. During his college days he was an avid sportsman, being a champion at table tennis and basketball.

Explaining his transition to acting which happened later in his career, he says that having an artist mother who's a gold medallist in Fine Arts, he himself indulged in artistic activities during his student days, namely drawing and theatre, the latter serving as base for his future as actor.

== Music career ==
=== Call ===
While in college Khan, along with Khurram Jabbar Khan and Sultan Raja, were Call band members. Later on Khan brought in two guitarists, Farooq Nasir and Usman Nasir, in the band. Soon the band released their first track, "Nishaan", which went viral on the internet and soon Call was amongst the mainstream artists of the country. Soon after, the band released their first music video of the song "Pukaar".

The band then started performing live at various event throughout Pakistan and also internationally. Khan and Farooq Nasir composed the album Jilawatan and were recording at Xulfiqar Jabbar Khan's (member of the band Entity Paradigm at time) audio studio in Lahore. Later on Farooq and Usman Nasir left the band due to their personal commitments and Khan asked Xulfiqar Jabbar Khan to join the band as the lead guitarist. The band completed the production of the album and Jilawatan was completed around 2005.

Khan wrote his first rock ballad, "Sab Bhulla Kay", in 2005. The band released the album Jilawatan with the song during the same year.

The band released the album with the video of the punk rock track "Main Esa Hi Hoon". Khan released another song, "Badal do Zamana", with Pepsi for the T20 World Cup in 2010.

=== Solo music ===
In 2011, while he was about to go to New York for the shoot of Mata-e-Jaan Hai Tu, Khan collaborated with American singer Jennifer Jandris. Khan composed and produced the track, and shot the video with Jandris in Washington DC around late 2011. The track was released on Valentine's Day in 2012.

At the end of 2012, Khan decided to depart from Call to seek a solo career in music.

In 2021, he released his new solo track "Taqdeer". The lyrics and composition of the song is Khan himself.

== Acting career ==
Khan made his acting debut with Jawad Bashir's sitcom Kabhi Na Kabhi, the soundtrack of which was also composed by Khan. He played the lead in another serial from the same production house, and he was later cast by Moomal Productions as the lead in Mata-e-Jaan Hai Tu in early 2012. For his work in Dil Ki Lagi, he was nominated for the Best TV Actor (Terrestrial) in Lux Style Award, which took place in late 2012.

== Filmography ==
=== Television ===
Key
| † | Denotes film/series that have not yet been released |

| Year | Title | Character | Music | Network | Genre | Ref(s) |
|---|---|---|---|---|---|---|
| 2011 | Kabhi Na Kabhi | Junaid | Yes | Hum TV | Sitcom | |
| 2011 | Dil Ki Lagi | Sam | | ATV | Serial | |
| 2011 | Mujhay Roothnay Na Daina | Shehroz | | Hum TV | Serial | |
| 2012 | Mata-e-Jaan Hai Tu | Adam | | Hum TV | Serial | |
| 2012 | Yahan Pyar Nahi Hai | Saeem | | Hum TV | Serial | |
| 2012 | Madiha Maliha | Shehryaar | | Hum TV | Serial | |
| 2012 | Ek Maamooli si Larki | Akaash | | Hum TV | Telefilm | |
| 2013 | Ooper Gori Ka Makaan | Adeel | | Express Entertainment | Telefilm | |
| 2013 | Kadoorat | Daniyaal | | Hum TV | Serial | |
| 2013 | Meri Beti | Asad | | ARY Digital | Serial | |
| 2013 | Gumman | Faisal | | ARY Digital | Serial | |
| 2014 | Zara aur mehrunisssa | Zian | | ARY Digital | Serial | |
| 2014 | Mere Humdum Mere Dost | Mazhar | | Urdu1 | Serial | |
| 2014 | Firaaq | Shams | | Hum Tv | Serial | |
| 2014 | Jaane Kyun | Uzair | | ARY Digital | Serial | |
| 2014 | Rasam | Hamza | | Geo Tv | Serial | |
| 2015 | Nikah | Rohel | | Hum TV | Serial | |
| 2015 | Yeh Mera Deewanapan Hai | Jehangir | | APlus Entertainment | Serial | |
| 2015 | Duaa | Murtaza | | Geo TV | Serial | |
| 2015 | Unsuni | Yasif | | PTV Home | Serial | |
| 2016 | Ranj e Aashnai | Asad | | A Tv | Serial | |
| 2016 | Bin Roye | Safir | | | Serial | |
| 2016 | Dil-e-Beqarar | Mazhar | | Hum TV | Serial | |
| 2016 | Mumkin | Muneeb | | ARY Digital | Serial | |
| 2016 | Marzi | Zain | | Geo TV | Serial | |
| 2016 | Main Kaisay Kahun | Rowaid | | Urdu1 | Serial | |
| 2017 | Sun Yaara | Dr Talaal | Yes | Ary Digital | Serial | |
| 2017 | Ghari Do Ghari | Aurangzeb | | A-Plus Entertainment | Serial | |
| 2017 | Tere Liye Hai Mera Dil | Aazar | | Hum TV | Telefilm | |
| 2017 | Tumhari Marium | Hasan Shiraz | | Hum TV | Serial | |
| 2017 | Aadat | Azar | | TV ONE | Serial | |
| 2018 | Silsilay | Jawad | | Geo Entertainment | Serial | |
| 2018 | Ishq Tamasha | Mehrab | | Hum TV | Serial | |
| 2018 | Thays | Ashar | Yes | A-Plus Entertainment | Serial | |
| 2018 | Khasara | Moonis | | ARY Digital | Serial | |
| 2018 | Ro Raha Hai Dil | Ahad | | TVOne Pakistan | Serial | |
| 2018 | Kyunke Ishq Baraye Farokht Nahi | Shahzain | | A-Plus Entertainment | Serial | |
| 2019 | Kam Zarf | Azar | | Geo Entertainment | Serial | |
| 2019 | Hania | Junaid | | ARY Digital | Serial | |
| 2019 | Yaariyan | Ahmer | | Geo Entertainment | Serial | |
| 2019 | Mohabbat Na Kariyo | Asad | | Geo Entertainment | Serial | |
| 2019 | Adhooray Hain Hum | Faraz | | Express Entertainment | Serial | |
| 2020 | Kashf | Wajdaan | | Hum TV | Serial | |
| 2020 | Kasak | Daniyal | | ARY Digital | Serial | |
| 2020 | Mohabbatain Chahatain | Faraz | | Hum TV | Serial | |
| 2021 | Khuda Aur Muhabbat 3 | Sikandar | | Geo Entertainment | Serial | |
| 2021 | Ek Jhoota Lafz Mohabbat | Maaz | | Express Entertainment | Serial | |
| 2021 | Berukhi | Irteza | | ARY Digital | Serial | |
| 2021 | Inteha e Ishq | Saim | | A-Plus TV | Serial | |
| 2022 | Hum Tum | Sarmad Sultan | | Hum TV | Serial | |
| 2022 | Chand Si Dulhan | Sunny | | ARY Digital | Telefilm | |
| 2022 | Thori Sazish Thori Mudakhlat | Saarim | | Hum TV | Telefilm | |
| 2022 | Agar | Shawaiz | | Hum TV | Serial | |
| 2023 | Adan | Zaid | | Aan TV | Serial | |
| 2024 | Mehroom | Umair | | Geo Entertainment | Serial | |
| 2025 | Do Kinaray | Walid | | Green Entertainment | Serial | |
| 2025 | Case No 9 | Rohit | | Geo Entertainment | Serial | |
| 2026 | Rehmat | Bari | | ARY Digital | Serial | |
| 2026 | Muhafiz | SI Zawar Bakht | | Geo Entertainment | Serial | |
| 2026 | Mitti De Baway | Nazeer Shah | | Green Entertainment | Serial | |

=== Film ===
| Year | Title | Role | Notes |
|---|---|---|---|
| 2015 | Bin Roye | Safeer | Cameo |
| 2021 | Kahay Dil Jidhar | Sheheryar | Lead role |
| 2024 | Hum Tum Aur Woo | | |

== Discography ==
=== Albums with Call ===
- "Jilawatan" (2005)
- "Dhoom" (2011)

=== Music videos ===
- "Nishaan" (2003) from Jilawatan
- "Taqdeer" (2021)

== Awards and nominations ==
| Year | Ceremony | Category | Project | Result |
|---|---|---|---|---|
| 2012 | 11th Lux Style Awards | Best TV Actor (Terrestrial) | Dil Ki Lagi | Nominated |
| 2012 | 11th Lux Style Awards | Best Album of the Year | Dhoom | Nominated |
| 2022 | 21st Lux Style Awards | Best Film Actor | Kahay Dil Jidhar | Nominated |
