= Ajab Tamasha =

2012 rock song

Single by Entity Paradigm
- Released: December 21, 2012
- Recorded: 2011
- Genre: Alternative rock, progressive rock, heavy metal
- Length: 4:04
- Label: Independent
- Songwriter: Ahmed Ali Butt
- Producers: Ahmed Ali Butt, Salman Albert

Entity Paradigm singles chronology
"Shor Macha" (2010)	"Ajab Tamasha" (2012)

"Ajab Tamasha" (literal English translation: "Strange Circus") is a song by the Pakistani rock band Entity Paradigm. The song, along with the music video, was released on 21 December 2012 as part of the band's tenth anniversary. This was the band's first single released after the departure of Fawad Khan, who left to focus on his acting career, and drummer "Waqar Khan" who left because he moved from Lahore to Islamabad.

== Critical reception ==
Ajab Tamasha has received mixed to negative reviews. Haseeb Peer of Pakium said this one does not have the same essence as Shor Macha. Ahmed Uzair of Koolmuzone called it literally an Ajab Tamasha by the remains of EP. Express Tribune gave a positive review and said: EP stays true to its sound in a new era.

== Track listing ==
Ajab Tamasha

All tracks are written by Entity Paradigm.

No.	Title	Length
1.	"Ajab Tamasha"	4:04
2.	"Ajab Tamasha" (video)	4:09
