= Sunita Rajwar =

Indian actress (born 1969)

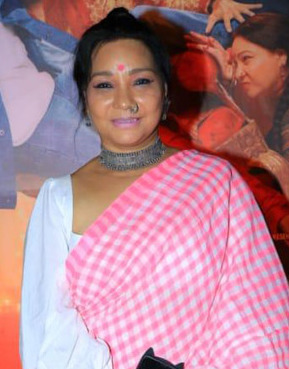
- Born: Bareilly, Uttar Pradesh, India
- Occupation: Actress
- Years active: 2001–present
- Known for: Ek Chalis Ki Last Local; Shubh Mangal Zyada Saavdhan; Bala; Stree; Kedarnath; Gullak
- Awards: Filmfare OTT Award

Sunita Chand Rajwar is an Indian actress known for working in film, television and stage productions. She graduated from the National School of Drama (NSD), New Delhi in 1997. She is known for her performance in the films including Ek Chalis Ki Last Local (2007), Shubh Mangal Zyada Saavdhan (2020), Bala (2019), Stree (2018), Kedarnath (2018), and the Sony LIV's comedy series Gullak. Her performance in last of these won her a Filmfare OTT Award for Best Supporting Actress in a Comedy Series.

She acted in Sanjay Khanduri's directorial debut Ek Chalis Ki Last Local as the gangster Chakli, where she was nominated for a Max Stardust Award 2008 in the category Breakthrough Performance – Female.

== Early life ==
Rajwar was born in Bareilly, Uttar Pradesh and raised in her home town Haldwani, Uttarakhand. She is second of three children, went to Nirmala Convent School, and later pursued her post-graduation from Kumaun University in Nainital. She graduated from the National School of Drama (NSD) in New Delhi in 1997.

== Career ==
After leaving the National School of Drama she moved to Mumbai appearing in several Bollywood movies such as Main Madhuri Dixit Banna Chahti Hoon (2003), Buddha Mar Gaya (2007), The White Elephant (2009), Dark comedy Bollywood Hindi movie Sanket City directed by Pankaj Advani (2009) and Ek Chalis Ki Last Local (2008), It was her role as Chakli, a Mumbai gangster, in Ek Chalis Ki Last Local that gained her a nomination for the Max Stardust Award 2008 in the category Breakthrough Performance – Female. Hisss (2010), Played pivotal role of Mad Granny 'Pagli Dadi' KAFAL: Wild Berries 2013.

She acted in the two-minute thriller, PAAP KA ANTH, which won gold in the Media category at the Abby Awards 2005. She is recently seen in her latest TV commercial ASKME APP With Ranbir Kapoor. She has done many other commercials in the past like "Mahindra Tractors" with Amitabh Bachchan, "Zee Movie Magic Masti," "Maxima Watch," and "Airtel."

She was in Ramayan as Manthara, Hitler Didi (2015) as Jamuna Dhai and Daksha Chachi in Santoshi Ma (2017). Rajwar became a household name with the TV serial Yeh Rishta Kya Kehlata Hai. Apart from Jub Love Hua, Yeh Rishta Kya Kehlata Hai, Ramayan and Hitler Didi, she has had roles in several television series, Rishtay on Zee TV, the horror drama Aahat on Sony TV, the horror show Ssshhhh...Koi Hai on Star Plus, the action crime drama CID on Sony TV and Savdhaan India on Life OK Channel.

Rajwar has played lead roles in several notable plays, including The Last Lear, The Lady from the Sea, Do Kashtiyon Ka Sawaar, The Farm, Dhruv Swamini, Janm Jay Ka Nag Yagya, Ras Priya, Do Aurtein, Paap Aur Prakash, Ashadh Ka Ek Din, Mummy, and Neena Gupta's Surya Ki Antim Kiran Se Surya Ki Pehli Kiran Tak.

== Filmography ==
=== Theatrical releases ===
Year	Film	Role	Director
2003	Main Madhuri Dixit Banna Chahti Hoon	Chutki's Friend	Chandan Arora (RGV Production)
2007	Buddha Mar Gaya	Munna's Sister	Rahul Rawail
2008	Ek Chalis Ki Last Local	Gangster Chakli	Sanjay Khanduri
2009	Sanket City	Gulabo	Pankaj Advani
2009	The White Elephant	Kamakshi	Aizaj khan
2010	Hisss	Drunken's wife	Jennifer Chambers Lynch
2013	Khafal: Wild Berries	Pagli Dadi	Children's Film Society, India (CFSI)
2018	Kedarnath	Daddo	Abhishek Kapoor
2018	Stree	Mother of Janna	Amar Kaushik
2019	Bala	Manju Bajpai Shukla	Amar Kaushik
2020	Shubh Mangal Zyada Saavdhan	Champa Tripathi	Hitesh Kewalya
2021	Urf Ghanta	Ghanta's chachi	Aayush Saxena
2024	Santosh	Geeta Sharma	Sandhya Suri
2024	Stree 2	Mother of Jana	Amar Kaushik
2026	Babita Singh Reporting	Babita's Mother-in-Law	Ambiecka Pandit
2026	Rajni Ki Baraat	Maa	Aditya Aman
2026	Nayyi Navelli	Asha Devi	Balaji Mohan

=== Writer / assistant director ===
Year	Film	Role	Directed by
2005	Mein, Meri Patni...Aur Woh!	Assistant Director	Chandan Arora
2010	Tequila Nights	Dialogue Writer	Pankaj Saraswat
2010	Striker	Story / Screenplay	Chandan Arora

=== TV commercials ===
Year	Ad	Production	Directed by
2005	PAAP KA ANTH	Soda Films Production	Rajesh Krishnan
2010	ASKME APP	Rajkumar Hirani Films	Rajkumar Hirani

=== Television ===
Year	Show	Role	Notes
1998	C.I.D	Asha's Friend Sharda	
2000	Aahat	Sara	Season 1: Episode No. 258-259 (Night College)
2001	Tum Pukaar Lo		
2002	Sanjhi		
2003	Achanak 37 Saal Baad	Sunita	Ajinkya's evil baby sitter (Episode No. 18-40)
2004	Shagun		
2005	Jab Love Hua	Dacoit Leader	
2009–2012	Yeh Rishta Kya Kehlata Hai	Dhaniya	
2012–2013	Ramayan	Manthara	
2013	Hitler Didi	Januna Dhai	
2015-2018	Santoshi Maa	Daksha	
2018	Agniphera	Baiju's Mother	
2018-2019	Perfect Pati	Maasa	
2019–2024	Gullak	Bittu Ki Mummy	Filmfare OTT Award for Supporting Actress in a Comedy series
2021	Nima Denzongpa	Nima's mother	Cameo
2022–2025	Panchayat 2	Kranti Devi	Season 2–4
2022	The Great Weddings of Munnes	Jigra Bua	
2026	Waiting Hai	Shanti Devi	
