= Rubina (actress) =

Indian actress (born 1984)

- Born: Rubina; 22 March 1984 (age 42); Chandigarh, India
- Occupations: Actress, director, writer
- Years active: 2001–present
- Website: www.rubina.co.in

Rubina is an Indian actress, known for her comic roles.

== Biography ==
Born on 22 March 1984 in Chandigarh, India, Rubina started her acting career on TV in 2001. She made mark through her stage performances in theater, including performances in Prajit Nayak, Study through Theatre Project Gaz Foot Inch, Guffaien, Urubhangam, Nagmandal. She debuted in Bollywood Industry with Namastey London in 2007

She is also a voiceover and dubbing artist. She wrote the screenplay for Punjabi film Yaaran Da Katchup in 2014.

== Filmography ==
=== Actor ===
Year	Film	Role	Notes
2007	Namastey London	Sister-In-Law 3	Punjabi film
2008	Jab We Met	Kareena's Cousin	Hindi film
2008	Hashar	Dolly	Punjabi film
2011	Munde Pataile de	Hero's Sister	Punjabi film
2013	Kismat Love Paisa Dilli	Metro Girl	Hindi film
2013	Lucky Di Unlucky Story	Roshan Prince Wife	Punjabi film
2013	Bhaji in Problem	Girl Impersonating Preet	Punjabi film
2014	Jatt James Bond	Bank Employee	Punjabi film
2014	Tigers	Nurse	Hindi film
