= Kismat Love Paisa Dilli =

Kismet Love Paisa Dilli
- Theatrical release poster
- Directed by: Sanjay Khanduri
- Written by: Sanjay Khanduri
- Produced by: Amit Chandra; Reshma Chandrra; Krishan Chaudhery
- Starring: Vivek Oberoi; Mallika Sherawat; Neha Dhupia
- Cinematography: Savita Singh; Rituraj Narain
- Edited by: Dharmendra Sharma; Sandeep Francis
- Music by: Amjad Nadeem; Santokh Singh
- Production company: Invincible Entertainment
- Release date: 5 October 2012
- Running time: 129 minutes
- Country: India
- Language: Hindi
- Budget: ₹16 crores
- Box office: ₹3.27 crores

Kismet Love Paisa Dilli (transl. Fate Love Money Delhi) is a 2012 Indian Hindi-language romantic comedy film directed by Sanjay Khanduri. The film stars Vivek Oberoi, Malika Sherawat, and Neha Dhupia in lead roles. It was released on 5 October 2012.

== Plot ==
The film is set on a winter night in Delhi, where a middle-class Delhi university guy falls in love with a girl anchoring a fashion show. In the process of wooing her, someone plants a sting operation tape in his pocket. This sting operation has a minister talking about buying and selling MLAs and media heads from his Swiss bank accounts. Unknowing, he is chased by corrupt cops and good guys to get that tape back. Soon he gets to know of tape with him and its high relevance. How this university student, who always talked against corruption like any layman, now gets bribed himself by the big offer thrown by the minister's man constitutes the climax of the story.

== Cast ==
- Vivek Oberoi as Lokesh Duggal (Lucky)
- Mallika Sherawat as Lovina
- Neha Dhupia as Anamika / Aarti Uttaroo
- Anshuman Jha as Nunna
- Meenal Kapoor as Sardarni
- Ashutosh Rana as Kaptan Sahab
- Tahir Raj Bhasin as Bamby
- Naveen Kaushik as Shishodiya
- Vishwanath Chatterjee as Popli
- Aseem Hattangady as Police Inspector Dhondiyal
- Rajat Kaul as Bajrang Dal
- Ashutosh Kaushik as Bhati
- Bobby Vats as Rohit Pichhwadiya
- Rubina as Metro Girl
- Lakha Lakhwinder Singh as Parminder
- Rajinder Sharma as Chaudhary

== Soundtrack ==
Kismat Love Paisa Dilli

Soundtrack album by Amjad Nadeem, Santokh Singh
- Released: 2012
- Genre: Feature film soundtrack
- Language: Hindi
External audio
- Official Audio Jukebox on YouTube

The soundtrack was composed by Amjad Nadeem and Santokh Singh, with lyrics written by Shabbir Ahmed and Santokh Singh.

Track listing
| No. | Title | Lyrics | Music | Singer(s) | Length |
|---|---|---|---|---|---|
| 1. | "Dhishkiyaon" | Shabbir Ahmed | Amjad Nadeem | Sonu Nigam, Ritu Pathak |
| 2. | "Appy Budday" (Videshi) | Santokh Singh | Santokh Singh | Santokh Singh |
| 3. | "Appy Budday" (Desi) | Santokh Singh | Santokh Singh | Santokh Singh |
| 4. | "Jugaad" | Shabbir Ahmed | Amjad Nadeem | Sukhwinder Singh, Mamta Sharma |
| 5. | "Don't Fuff My Mind" | Shabbir Ahmed | Amjad Nadeem | Mika Singh, Vivek Oberoi |
| 6. | "Don't Fuff My Mind" (Remix) | Shabbir Ahmed | Amjad Nadeem | Mika Singh, Vivek Oberoi |

== Reception ==
=== Critical reception ===
Rohit Khilnani of Rediff gave the film 1 out of 5, writing "KLPD is teeming with lame stereotypes. Homosexuals, especially, have been portrayed in an exaggerated manner. The jokes only get more stereotypical and distasteful. Girls are called Totta (a New Delhi slang for a hot chick), all the city cops are out to break every law, a young Sikh kid is asked, "Barah baj gaye kya?" and all middle class boys are a bunch of embarrassing skirt-chasers." Taran Adarsh of Bollywood Hungama gave the film 1.5 out of 5, writing "Vivek Oberoi has the boyish charm that makes him do outlandish and outrageous stuff. He does it all with sincerity. Mallika Sherawat enacts her part monotonously. Ashutosh Rana is wasted. Ditto for Neha Dhupia. The remaining actors just fill the bill. On the whole, KLPD - KISMET LOVE PAISA DILLI is a comedy that neither entertains nor tickles. In fact, this comedy is more of a tragedy!" Rachit Gupta of Filmfare wrote "KLPD is unconvincing of what genre it’s trying to represent and it doesn’t help that the film is slavishly formulaic. Not to say all is bad. Ashutosh Rana and his Haryanvi gang of goons are fairly entertaining, so is Anshuman Jha in what looks like a cross between Bruce Lee and Jim Carrey." Vinayak Chakravorty of India Today wrote "KLPD falls short of imagination and wit when it comes to setting up the thrills. Khanduri's last Metro just doesn't have the pace of his Last Local."
