= Sanjay Khanduri =

Sanjay M. Khanduri
- Born: New Delhi, India
- Occupation(s): Director, Writer
- Years active: 1999–present

Sanjay M. Khanduri is an Indian film director from Bollywood, best known for the directing Ek Chalis Ki Last Local .

== Film career ==
He started his career as an investigative correspondent for news channel TV18. He was second assistant director in the Taal (1999) and as Chief associate director in Dil Hai Tumhara (2002).

Khanduri feature film debut as a director was 2007 film Ek Chalis Ki Last Local , starring Abhay Deol and Neha Dhupia along with Nawazuddin Siddiqui. His second film Kismat Love Paisa Dilli, featuring Vivek Oberoi, Malika Sherawat and Ashutosh Rana in lead roles was released in 2012.

== Filmography ==
- Ek Chalis Ki Last Local (2007)
- Kismat Love Paisa Dilli (2012)
