= Nescafé Basement =

Pakistani television music show

- Initial logo
- Created by: Xulfi
- Country of origin: Pakistan
- Original languages: English; Urdu
- No. of seasons: 6
- No. of episodes: 59

Original release
- Network: A Plus Entertainment; Metro One; Play TV; Style 360; TVOne Global
- Release: 8 September 2012 – present

Nescafé Basement is a Pakistani music television series produced by the Nescafé brand which features performances recorded in a studio by underground and emerging musicians. The performers are recruited and mentored by Xulfi, who also serves as the show's music producer. The first song released by Nescafé Basement was a cover of Sajjad Ali's "Larri Adda".

== Season 1 ==
In September 2012, the brand went around college campuses looking for young, exceptionally talented, but unknown musicians who could sing and play a variety of instruments. The 15 best musicians were then mentored by Xulfi from the band Call.

== Season 2 ==
Out of 1,253 young artists who auditioned (compared to only 98 for the first season), Xulfi selected 19 (whereas 14 were selected last season) from major cities across the country.

Nescafe Basement 2 had eight weekly episodes, each showcasing two songs with behind-the-scenes documentaries which highlight the journey of hidden musical prodigies. Apart from television broadcasts, the show will also have a digital component that includes their website, Facebook page and Twitter.

== Season 5 ==
Season 5 of the show featured a total of 73 artists under Xulfi's mentorship and was one of the most praised seasons of a music show in the subcontinent and worldwide, featuring hit tracks like Bol Hu, Mehbooba and Piya Re.

== Songs and Performers ==
Season 2

Songs:
1. Tere Ishq Mein (Alan Faqir & Mohammad Ali Sheikhi)
2. Akhiyan Udeek Diyan (Nusrat Fateh Ali Khan)
3. Boom Boom (Nazia Hassan)
4. Mr. Fraudiye (Awaz)
5. Koye Mannay Ya Na Mannay (Rizwan Butt)
6. Sweet Nothing (Calvin Harris ft. Florence Welch)
7. Sweet Child O' Mine (Guns N Roses)
8. Qadmon Talay (Syed Misbah Uddin)
9. Sab Bhula Ke (Call)
10. What Do You Want From Me (Adam Lambert)
11. Run To You (Bryan Adams)

Performers:
Hamza Tanveer (Vocals)
Altamash Sever (Vocals)
Abu Baker Javed (Saarangi & Surmandal)
Rizwan Butt (Vocals & Acoustic Guitars)
Parizae Azhar Malik (Vocals & Harmonies)
Sohaib Shafiq (Sitar)
Syed Misbah Uddin (Guitars)
Sameen Qasim (Vocals)
Shairi Bakhshi (Tabla)
Usman Sheikh (Guitars & Vocals)
Bilawal Lahooti (Drums)
Rutuba Muhammad Yaqub (Harmonies)
Shahrukh Aslam (Guitar)
Mansoor Lashaari (Drums)
Jibraan Saeed (Saxophone)
Haider Abbas (Bass)
Adrian David Emmanuel (Flute & Harmonies)
Asfer Hussain (Vocals & Rubaab)
Turaab Khan (Vocals, Keyboard, & Harmonies)

Season 3

No. overall	No. in season	Title		Written by	Original release date
TBA	1	"Allah Ho Ayaat"	Hamza Tanveer, Rizwan Butt & Sibtain Khalid	TBA	TBA
TBA	2	"Do Pal"	Usman Sheikh	TBA	TBA
TBA	3	"Nishaan"	Sherry Kattak, Ali Suhail, Altamash Server, Maria Fatima, Parizae Azhar	TBA	TBA
TBA	4	"Rah Mein"	Muhammad Ali Suhail	TBA	TBA
TBA	5	"Crazy"	Maria Unera	TBA	TBA
TBA	6	"Out of Mind"	Ikra Saleem	TBA	TBA
TBA	7	"Pee Jaon"	Hamza Tanveer & Momina Muhstehsan	TBA	TBA
TBA	8	"Kal Naheen"	Sherry Kattak	TBA	TBA
TBA	9	"Give me Love"	Parizae Azhar Malik	TBA	TBA
TBA	10	"Dhol Bhaje Ga"	Altamash Server	TBA	TBA
TBA	11	"Sajna"	Sibtain Khalid	TBA	TBA
TBA	12	"She's Got The Look"	Haider Mustehsan	TBA	TBA
TBA	13	"Bhangi"	Rizwan Butt	TBA	TBA
TBA	14	"Anjaane"	Sherry Khattak & Maria Unera	TBA	TBA
TBA	15	"Larger Than Life"	Altamash Server	TBA	TBA
TBA	16	"Mera Ishq"	Hamza Tanveer & Rizwan Butt	TBA	TBA

Season 4

No. overall	No. in season	Title		Written by	Original release date
TBA	1	"Tere Jiya Hor Disdah"	Zeeshan Ali	TBA	TBA
TBA	2	"Jaadu Ka Chiragh"	Awaz Band	TBA	TBA
TBA	3	"Tu Mera Nahin"	Rizwan Anwar	Rizwan Anwar	TBA
TBA	4	"Kameez Teri Kaali"	Mehak Ali	TBA	TBA
TBA	5	"Love Me Again"	All Girl Band	TBA	TBA
TBA	6	"Awaz Du"	Abdullah Qureshi	TBA	TBA
TBA	7	"Gorak Dhanda"	Zain Ali & Asfar Hussain & Zayrab Sultan	TBA	TBA
TBA	8	"Mein Hoon"	Richie & Leo Twins	TBA	TBA
TBA	9	"Fanaa"	Sherry Khattak	TBA	TBA
TBA	10	"Forever"	Yasrah Haseeb	TBA	TBA
TBA	11	"Talaash"	Altamash Server	TBA	TBA
TBA	12	"Na Kaho"	Faraz Nayyer	TBA	TBA
TBA	13	"Kitni Saadiyan"	Faraz Anwar	TBA	TBA

Season 5

No. overall	No. in season	Title		Written by	Original release date
TBA	1	"Bol Hu"	Soch the band & Hadiya Hashmi	Adnan Dhool	February 1, 2019
TBA	2	"Mehbooba"	Ali Asghar, Ali Tariq, Hamza Tanveer	Unknown	February 1, 2019
TBA	3	"Haiderium"	Zain & Zohaib Ali	Zohaib Ali	February 9, 2019
TBA	4	"Ranjhna"	Shahzad-e-Ali	Shahzad Ali	February 9, 2019
TBA	5	"Piyar Diya Gallan"	All Kids Band	TBD	TBA
TBA	6	"Piya Re"	Jahangir Niazi	TBD	February 23, 2019
TBA	7	"Teri Yaad"	Ali khan	TBD	February 23, 2019
TBA	8	"Resistance"	Abdullah Siddiqui	Abdullah Siddiqui	March 16, 2019
TBA	9	"Aadat Instrumental/Bhanwaray"	Goher Mumtaz	Goher Mumtaz	March 18, 2019
TBA	10	"Gharoli-Ghoom Charakhra"	Tahseen Sakina and Baluch Twins	TBD	March 25, 2019

Season 6

No. overall	No. in season	Title		Written by	Original release date
TBA	1	"Saaqi"	Ittehad Band & Sanya Shahzad	Ghulam Ullah (Sindhi) & Sanya Shahzad (English)	December 28, 2024
TBA	2	"Youn hi"	Towers & Hadia Hashmi	Towers	January 4, 2025
TBA	3	"Hum Tum"	Ahtasham Bashir	Sami Qahar	January 13, 2025
TBA	4	"Tere Pichay"	Bilal Maqbool & Surtaal Choir	Bilal Maqbool and Arsalan Hasan	January 18, 2025
TBA	5	"Na Milay"	Havi & Afifa Moin	Abdur Rahman Sajid, Afifa Moin, Arsalan Hasan, Haider Abbas and Saad Saleem	January 25, 2025
TBA	6	"Tunjhi Rah"	Amjad Mirani & Shareh Akhtar	Amjad Mirani, Shareh Akhtar	February 1, 2025
TBA	7	"Ki Vekhi"	Ashal Haider Khan & Maliha J. Khan	Ashal Haider Khan, Maliha Javed Khan	February 8, 2025
TBA	8	"Woh Raat"	Havi & Mohammad Saad Saleem	Saad Saleem & Havi	February 15, 2025
TBA	9	"Kho Gye"	Shayan Fatani & Mishal Shafi	Shayan Fatani, Mishal Shafi, Abdullah Kasumbi	February 19, 2025

== Artists ==
- Abdullah Qureshi (Singer)
- Leo Twins
- Soch the Band
- Goher Mumtaz
- Tahseen Sakina
- Hadiya Hashmi
- Jahangir Niazi
- Zain Ali and Zohaib Ali
- Bhanwaray
- Baluch Twins
- Abdullah Siddiqui
- Wooly and the Uke

Season 6

- Ittehad Band
- Sanya Shahzad
- Towers
- Hadia Hashmi
- Ahtasham Bashir
- Bilal Maqbool
- Surtaal Choir
- Havi
- Afifa Moin
- Amjad Mirani

== Awards ==
- Winner in Hot Beverages - PAS Awards 2013
- Most Magnetic Branded Content - Maxus Magnets Award 2013

== See also ==
- Coke Studio
- Music of Pakistan
- Uth Records
