= Styled By Neha =

Indian reality show

- Genre: Dressing show
- Starring: Neha Dhupia; Diva Dhawan; Elton Fernandez
- Country of origin: India
- Original language: English
- No. of seasons: 1
- No. of episodes: 7

Production
- Production location: Mumbai
- Running time: 45 minutes
- Production company: Conde Nast Entertainment

Original release
- Network: Fox Life
- Release: 18 October – 30 November 2018

Styled By Neha is an Indian reality-television series on Fox Life about various dressing codes and styles across the Indian subcontinent and also from in or around the world.

The series features Neha Dhupia (Indian actress), Diva Dhawan and Elton Fernandez as show's main hosts.

== See also ==
- Style By Jury
