= Xulfi Khan =

Pakistani music composer, born (1980)

Zulfiqar Jabbar Khan
- ذوالفقار جبار خان
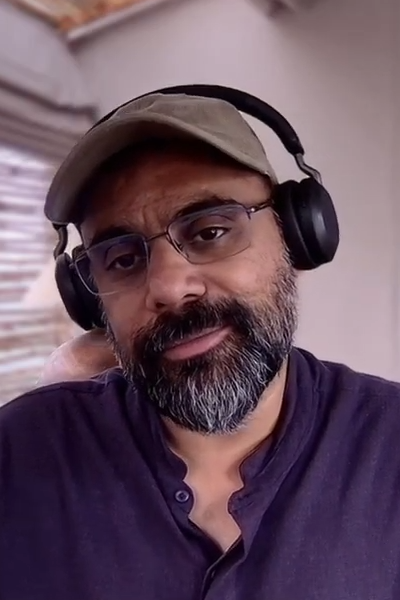
- Xulfi in 2024
- Born: 28 October 1980 (age 46); Lahore, Punjab, Pakistan
- Other name: Xulfi
- Education: National University of Computer and Emerging Sciences
- Occupations: Composer, songwriter, music producer, singer
- Years active: 1996–present
- Television: Nescafé Basement; Coke Studio
- Musical career
- Genres: Rock, pop, electronic, World music
- Instruments: Vocals, guitar, percussion, keyboard
- Labels: Nescafé Basement; Lips Music; BMN; Fire Records (Pakistan); HOM Records; Coke Studio Pakistan

Zulfiqar "Xulfi" Jabbar Khan (born 28 October 1980) is a Pakistani composer, singer-songwriter, music producer and guitarist. Starting his career in 1994, Khan is the recipient of multiple awards in Pakistan. He is currently working on the television series Coke Studio, for which he is the producer and mentor.

== Life and career ==
Xulfi graduated from the National University of Computer and Emerging Sciences with a CGPA of 2.4. He was the composer, music producer, guitarist for Entity Paradigm (EP). Entity Paradigm was formed by Xulfi between 1996 and 1999 but was officially announced as a band only in 2000.

He is currently the music producer, songwriter, and lead guitarist for the band Call. After the vocalist's exit from the band, he continued with other projects at his studio X^{th} Harmonic. The band made a comeback after 3 years to produce and perform new songs for the fans. He has always been a music fanatic and tries to come up with new ideas. He blames the lack of proper recognition of music as a separate 'industry', as the reason for its limited success. Additionally, he states that people in general are not exposed to arts and culture and cultural propagation must be encouraged to make a pervasive and progressive culture and spark the positive interest of the nation in the field.

Khan has also been involved in a number of Bollywood projects as composer, lyricist and producer. Some of his works include "Laaree Chooti" from Ek Chalis Ki Last Local in 2007, "Yeh Pal" from Aasma in 2009, "Dhadke Jiya" from Aalo Chaat in 2009, and "Kuch Aisa, Kuch Aisa (Sad Version)" and "Reh Jaane Do" from Aao Wish Karein in 2009.

Khan has produced, recorded, engineered, mixed and mastered music albums for Call's Jilawatan and Dhoom, Entity Paradigm's album Irtiqa, Jal's album Aadat, Roxen's album Rozen-e-Deewar, Inteha's album Daastaan, and Ankur Tewari's album Jannat.

His work with Nescafé Basement has also been praised. In 2015, Roxette shared Nescafé Basement's cover of their song "She's Got the Look". In 2016, John Newman expressed his appreciation for the Nescafé Basement cover version of his song "Love Me Again" by an all-female band (with Xulfi as the producer), and called it "dope".

Xulfi is the creative director and co-founder of Sync, a tech/driven experience curation company. Recently they have worked on the visual curation of Nescafé Basement's "Resistance", Coca-Cola "Hum Aik Hain" anthem and Fawad Khan's "Uth Jaag" for Pepsi Battle of the Bands. Xulfi has also co-founded Giraffe Pakistan, a content creation company and creative hub with Muhammad Ibrahim and Sync is the subdivision of it. He acts as the chief creative officer (CCO).

== Brands and endorsements ==
Xulfi has worked with various popular brands including Nescafé Basement, Pepsi Battle of the Bands, McDonald's, Coke, Peshawar Zalmi and more. He produced "Hum Aik Hain" the official anthem by Coca-Cola Pakistan for 2019 Cricket World Cup. This anthem featured 40 musical instruments, most of which were indigenous instruments.

Khan also produced the team anthem for Pakistan Super League team Peshawar Zalmi named as "Hum Zalmi"..

Xulfi also assembled 40 drummers to create a new national song "Pakistan Zindabad", which was also featured in Gulf News. This song was created to revive the spirit of nationalism. 40 drummers gathered at Bradlaugh Hall for this song.

Zulfiqar joined hands with WWF Pakistan to create awareness about planting trees and released a video song "Rung Do". Khan termed it as more than just a song in an interview with Dawn News.

For Pepsi Battle of the Bands season 2, Khan came for a reunion with Entity Paradigm and performed "Hamesha" with Fawad Khan, Ahmad Ali Butt, and the entire original lineup.

In August 2020, Khan became the first Pakistani musician to get endorsed by Vicoustic – a soundproofing company specializing in acoustic treatments.

== Contributions to Pakistani music ==
Xulfi has contributed to Pakistani music not only through music but by introducing new bands and musicians. On Nescafé Basement, he helped formed the first-ever all-girl band in Pakistan. Another band that Xulfi formed in Nescafé Basement is the all-kids band that covered "Pyar Diyan Gallan" by Fakhar-e-Alam.

== Pakistan Super League 5 ==
Xulfi composed and produced the official PSL Anthem named "Tayyar Hain" for the 5th edition of Pakistan Super League. The anthem featured Haroon, Asim Azhar, Ali Azmat, and Arif Lohar. The song received heavy criticism from listeners, particularly on social media. This edition is the fastest to reach 5 million views on YouTube amongst previous PSL anthems. The song got appreciation from all the stakeholders including team owners, players, and the Pakistan Cricket Board because of its festive theme, cultural music, and upbeat composition.

== Music videos ==
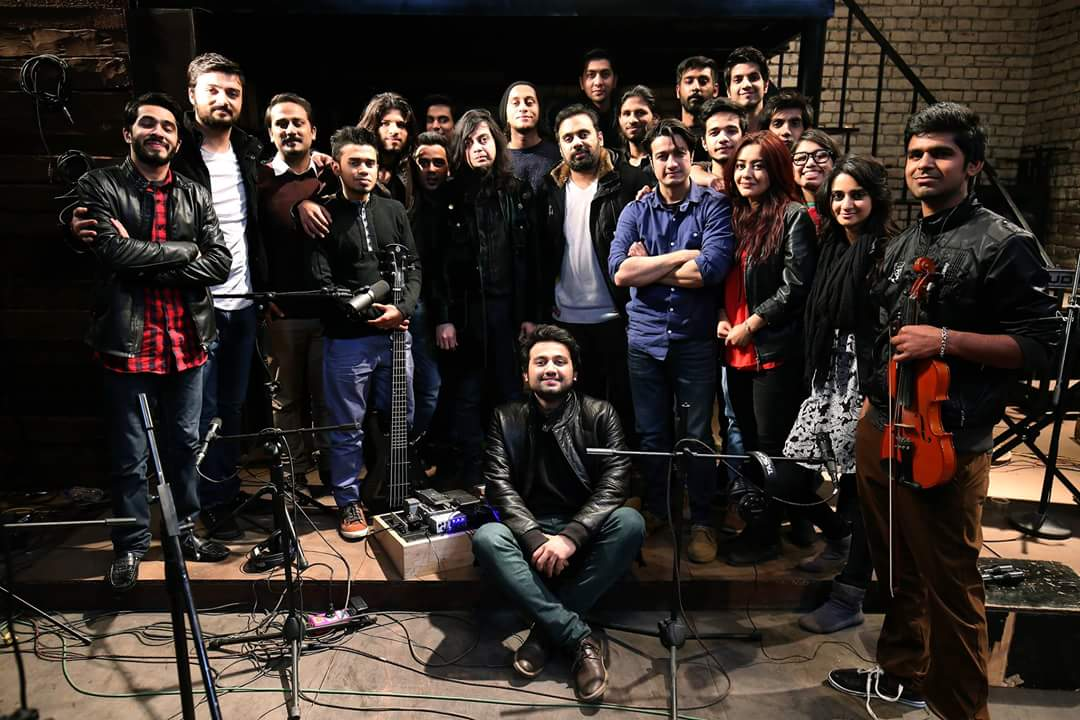
Khan (standing, centre) with Nescafé Basement 4 team

Music video	Album	Band	Year
"Aghosh"آغوش	Irtiqa	Entity Paradigm	2003
"Hamein Aazma"ہمیں آزما	Irtiqa	Entity Paradigm	2003
"Kahan Hai Tu"کہاں ہے تو	Irtiqa	Entity Paradigm	2003
"Waqt"وقت	Irtiqa	Entity Paradigm	2003
"Hamesha"همیشه	Irtiqa	Entity Paradigm	2003
"Nishaan"نشان	Jilawatan	Call	2003
"Pukaar"پکار	Jilawatan	Call	2003
"Shayad"شاید	Jilawatan	Call	2004
"Sab Bhula Kai" سب بھلا کی	Jilawatan	Call	2005
"Bichar Kai Bhee"بچار کی بھی	Jilawatan	Call	2006
"Kuch Naheen"کچھ نہیں	Jilawatan	Call	2006
"Hum Se Hai Yeh Zamaana"ہم سے ہے یہ زمانہ	Dhoom	Call	2007
"Aasmaan"آسمان	Dhoom	Call	2007
"Ho Jaane De"ہو جانے دے	Dhoom	Call	2009
"Main Aisa He Hoon"میں ایسا ہے ہوں	Dhoom	Call	2011
"Teri Haar Hum"تیری ہار ہم	Dhoom	Call	2017
"Tu Jhoom"تو جھوم	Coke Studio Season 14	Naseebo Lal and Abida Parveen	2022

== Discography ==
=== Albums ===
Release date	Album	Band
1 October 2003	Irtiqa	Entity Paradigm
20 November 2005	Jilawatan	Call
26 January 2011	Dhoom	Call

=== Bollywood ===
Year	Song	Film
2007	Laree Chootee	Ek Chalis Ki Last Local
2009	Yeh Pal	Aasma
2009	Dharkay Jiya	Aloo Chaat

== Nescafé Basement ==
He was music producer and mentor for Nescafé basement season 1–5.

== Coke Studio ==
In June 2021, Zulfiqar Jabbar Khan was announced as the producer of Coke Studio Season 14, taking over the popular music show from Rohail Hyatt. The official announcement was made by Xulfi on his social media channels when he shared a picture of a Coke Studio Season 14 book with the caption "The journey begins". The news went viral on the internet and fans expressed great excitement, terming it as the best thing to happen to Coke Studio. He also produced the song "Kana Yaari".

== Humnava ==
In 2026 Xulfi launched a new global music and art camp that brings together musicians from around the world for collaboration, co-creation, and cultural exchange. The season consists of 9 songs, with all of them produced by Xulfi.

No. overall	No. in season	Title		Written by	Original release date
1	1	"Hairaan Amanam"	Rizwan Abbas & Maheen Sattar	Zulfiqar Ali Khan Bercha	April 16, 2026
2	2	"Noor e Nazar"	Noman Asmet & Noorima Rehan	Shjr Hussain, Imran Ullah Hunzai (Ramz), Ali Raza, Xulfi	April 23, 2026
3	3	"Qataghani"	4 Rubabs & GrayContrast ft. Blaise Merlin	Marhoom Ustad Ghulam Abbas Hassanabadi	April 30, 2026
4	4	"Holoyor"	Naveed Deevon & Gojal Twins feat. Sherry Khattak	M Rahim (Faiz Rahim	May 7, 2026
5	5	"Sway"	Elijah Bwalya & Joshua Bwalya ft. Peter Corser	Xulfi, Zyad Ahmed Tariq	May 14, 2026
6	6	"Lost in Love"	Zain Zohaib & Damsaaz ft. Shahid Hussain	Zain Zohaib, Imran Hunzai and Xulfi	May 21, 2026
7	7	"Koi Achi Khabar"	Faheem Uddin Hunzai	Imran Ullah Hunzai (Ramz)	May 28, 2026
8	8	"Isekta"	Tissilawen & Eliza Khan ft. Melvin Arthur	Bakrin Timlfati	June 4, 2026
9	9	"Darmaan"	Aaryan & Faheem Uddin ft. Lina Belaid & Veeru Shan	Imran Ullah Hunzai (Ramz)	June 11, 2026
