= Shor Macha =

Single by Entity Paradigm
- Released: August 13, 2010
- Recorded: 2010
- Genre: Alternative rock, Progressive rock
- Length: 4:25 (single version); 4:31 (video)
- Label: Independent
- Songwriters: Ahmed Ali Butt, Fawad Afzal Khan
- Producers: Ahmed Ali Butt, Fawad Afzal Khan

Entity Paradigm singles chronology
"Irtiqa III" (2005)	"Shor Macha" (2010)	"Ajab Tamasha" (2012)

"Shor Macha" (Urdu: شور مچا, literal English translation: "make noise") is a song by the Pakistani rock band Entity Paradigm. It is the overall seventh single release by the band, and also being the first single since their comeback in 2009. On August 13, 2010, Entity Paradigm released "Shor Macha" as the first single from their upcoming second studio album, the music video of the song was a dedication to all Pakistanis. The music video of the song was sponsored by djuice and directed by Bilal Lashari.

On December 26, in an online poll by Dawn News the band's video for their single, "Shor Macha", was voted as the second best music video of 2010.

== Background ==
On March 12, 2009, Entity Paradigm announced its official return by performing for first time in over four years. The performance was held at LUMS and was attended by an enthusiastic audience. Without Xulfi and Sajjad A. Khan, the current formation of the band includes Fawad Khan on rhythm guitar and vocals, and Ahmed Ali Butt on keyboards and vocals, Hassan Khalid on bass, Salman Albert on lead guitars, and Waqar Khan on drums. Unfortunately, the reunion did not make big news in the press and media.

Shortly after their reunion they went on performing in Karachi at Ramada Hotel on May 1, 2009 where the band debut their new song "Shor Macha". They also announced that their second album will be released in December 2010.

In February 2010, news broke about Entity Paradigm taking part in the Coke Studio third season and were found jamming with Arif Lohar at Coke Studio in Karachi. It was also reported that they are going to perform a song together. On February 20, 2010, the band announced that they will be shooting the video of their new single "Shor Macha" and through Facebook invited fans to take part in the shooting of the music video. On March 23, Pakistan Day, exactly one year after their reunion there, the band performed at LUMS where they also performed "Shor Macha". Entity Paradigm also uploaded a sample of their song on their official Facebook page. On August 12, a day before the release of the single Entity Paradigm altered their status to “Kuch Shor Macha Awaz Utha, Jo Josh Dikha Wo Bepanah, Ab Soch Badal K Kuch Kar Dikha, Jo Ban Jaye Azaad Khiyal, Har Azam Tera Kar De Dhamal, Har Amal Tera Wo Bemisal, Kuch Shor Macha Awaz Utha, Coming Soon” on their official fan page on Facebook, announcing their new arrival officially.

== Music video ==
The main concept and theme of the video focus on the social and political issues confronted by Pakistan, while later referring to past achievements. Through the lyrics, the video presents a message concerning a safer and stable future. The video opens with images from the streets of inner Lahore, along with images of children and young men. The opening sequence depicts the nation being encouraged to become more active, express their views, and take action. Meanwhile, all the band members are shown during the opening phase. The video initially shows EP performing in a digitally created stadium concert, which can be interpreted as depicting the possibility of large-scale public gatherings in Pakistan without security concerns.

A screenshot from the video showing the band performing in a stadium.

The video is shot on various locations from Pakistan; Mazar-e-Quaid, Minar-e-Pakistan, Badshahi Masjid, Kallar Kahar, Bahawalpur Fort, Cholistan Desert and interior Lahore, to name a few. The video emphasizes on present issues in Pakistan such as; terrorism, flood and illiteracy, followed by the phrases “Mera hai yakeen mera hai, Imaan mere hatho mai, Ho kiya ye sara jahan” which again is a message of trust and happiness to people out there who have abandoned all the hopes. Towards the end, Ahmed Ali Butt raps in Urdu which is shot from Minar-e-Pakistan’s top. It is coupled with some clips from Pakistan Resolution Day as well. Then the National Anthem is being synchronized with the song along with the sequences of our National achievements such as; images from the army side, missile launches, Abdus Salam receiving the Nobel Prize, Jansher Khan, celebrations after winning World Cup 1992 and 2009, music legends Nazia Hassan, Nusrat Fateh Ali Khan, Noor Jehan and finally sequence of Nishan-e-Haider holders, is shown.

The video of the single "Shor Macha" is directed by Bilal Lashari. Wardrobe and styling by Munib Nawaz and make up by Mahram Azmat. The production of the video was done by Creative Village.

== Track listing ==
Shor Macha

All tracks are written by Entity Paradigm.

No.	Title	Length
1.	"Shor Macha"	4:25
2.	"Shor Macha" (video)	4:31
