= Entity Paradigm =

Pakistani heavy metal band

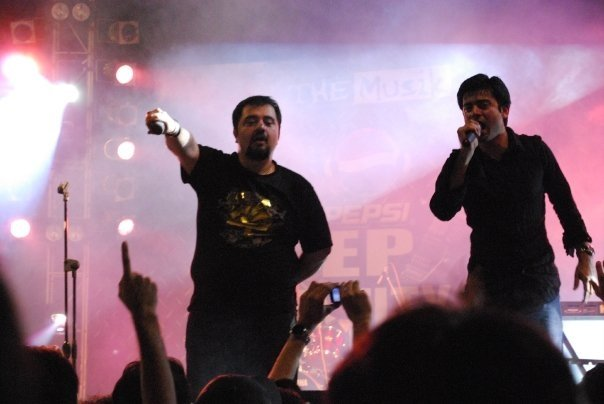

Background information
- Origin: Lahore, Punjab, Pakistan
- Genres: Rap rock; nu metal
- Years active: 2000–2007; 2009–2015; 2017 (reunion)
- Labels: Lips Music (2002-2007); Independent (2009-2015); Rearts Records (2021-present)
- Members: Ahmed Ali Butt; Hassaan Khalid; Salman Albert; Zulfiqar Jabbar Khan; Sajjad Ali Khan; Fawad Khan
- Past members: Ali Asad Khan; Waqar Ahmed Khan

Entity Paradigm (Punjabi, Urdu: اینٹٹی پیراڈائم, in English sometimes shortened as EP) was a Pakistani rock band from Lahore, Punjab, formed in 2000. The band was founded by songwriter and guitarist Xulfi, vocalist, songwriter Fawad Khan and keyboardist and vocalist Ahmed Ali Butt who were soon joined by Salman Albert on guitars, Ali Asad Khan on drums, Hassaan Khalid on rhythm guitars and Waqar Ahmed on drums, since then there had been many changes in the line-up the only consistent members being Ahmed Ali Butt, Salman Albert, and Hassaan Khalid.

The band is one of the mainstream rock bands in the Pakistani music industry. Their debut album, Irtiqa, released in 2003, is the first mainstream concept album to be released by a Pakistani artist. The album, produced by Xulfi, Fawad Khan and Mekaal Hasan, was critically acclaimed in Pakistan.

In 2007, Entity Paradigm had an interview with a local newspaper in which they announced that the band would disband due to various members aiming to pursue different projects. Early reports from the band hinted towards an album release in late 2004. In 2009, the band announced their official comeback with Fawad Khan and Ahmed Ali Butt in leading positions. However, two of the main members of the band, Xulfi and Sajjad A. Khan, decided not to make a comeback due to work on different projects.

== History ==
=== Early years (1996–1999) ===
Initially, Entity and Paradigm were two separate bands that were active in Lahore's underground music scene. During the early 2000s, Ahmed Ali Butt, lead vocalist of Entity and Fawad Khan, lead vocalist of Paradigm, were working together for a popular television sitcom Jutt and Bond aired on Indus Vision, it was then when the program's director suggested that the actors' bands collaborate and do a title track for the show. Led by Zulfikar Jabbar Khan, aka Xulfi, lead guitarist of Paradigm, the two bands collaborated and within a week recorded the title song "Hamein Aazma", which was played at the beginning and end of the show.

=== Formation (2002) ===
In early 2002, during this time Pepsi's Battle of the Bands advertisement began to air on television; the competition called upon entries of aspiring bands from all over Pakistan. Since neither Entity nor Paradigm had any of their independent releases or compilations on the record, they decided to send "Hamein Aazma" to the competition as a collaborative effort. It was during this time that Entity Paradigm officially came into being.

Entity Paradigm got together for the Battle of the Bands and went to Karachi, Sindh, to take part in the competition. The band first took part in the digital round of the competition, where the band went on head to head with two thousand bands from across the four provinces of Pakistan. The competition included competition bands like Aaroh, Mekaal Hasan Band and Mizmaar, which also, later on, became popular mainstream rock bands coming from the underground music scene. By then it was speculated that the band initiated the composing of two brand new and improved tracks never heard before, "Kahan Hai Tu" and a cover of the late Sufi singer, Nusrat Fateh Ali Khan. The band also performed a cover of "Face of Love" American musician Eddie Vedder at the competition.

After a 16½-months hiatus, during which the competition was being aired on national, cable and satellite television programs, viewers polled for their favorite band in the competition. During this break, Abid Khan, bassist of the band, left the band to travel to England and fulfill certain filial obligations. Bassist, Sajjad Ali Khan was recruited as a replacement for Abid Khan. By then the results of the Battle of the Bands came out and it was told that two bands who made to the finals were Entity Paradigm along with Aaroh. The band again went on to perform in Karachi to compete at the finals of the competition. Although the band lost to Aaroh by a narrow margin, the band did manage to entertain a strong audience of around 4,000 at the NRA Golf Club, where the finals were held.

=== Breakthrough era (2002–2005) ===
On 13 August 2002, Entity Paradigm performed live at the Race Course Park in Lahore opening for Strings. On 20 September 2002, the band made their live debut at the Lahore Grammar School, Gulberg. The boys were met by a very vocal and receptive crowd that stayed on their feet during the entire performance which lasted for more than an hour. On 1 October 2002, Pepsi signed Entity Paradigm on a year deal. On 6 October, after their explosive live debut performance at Lahore Grammar School, Gulberg, the band rocked a crowd of more than 600 at the Defence Auditorium. The concert was held under the auspices of Lahore Grammar School, Defence. On 13 October, the band announced that they will be recording their new songs in the studio after a week. The name of both songs were called "Waqt" and "Rahguzar

Hamein Aazma
Hamein Aazma, Entity Paradigm's single from their critical acclaimed debut studio album Irtiqa (2003). The single originally featured as a soundtrack for a television comedy sitcom Jutt and Bond aired by Indus Vision.

Waqt
Waqt, Entity Paradigm's single from their critical acclaimed debut studio album Irtiqa (2003). The single topped all local charts and also charted at the top in India.

On 2 November 2002, the band headed off to Karachi to perform at the College of Business & Management. On 6 December 2002, Entity Paradigm released samples of "Waqt" and "Rahguzar". On 7 December, the music video of "Kahan Hai Tu" was shot at Walton Airport, Lahore directed by Ahmed Ali Butt, which was attended by a crowd of 150 people for the shooting. On 14 December, the band performed in Karachi again at the PAF Yacht Club. On 27 December, the band along with Call performed at Lobelia School System, Gulberg in Lahore. On 28 December, Entity Paradigm performed at the Rock Music Festival, the biggest rock music event of Pakistan, held at Alhamra in Lahore.

On 11 January 2003, Entity Paradigm performed along with nine other underground bands at the National Rock Festival 2003 held at the Model Town Club, in Lahore. On 1 October 2003, after recording songs during the summers, the band released their debut full-length studio album, which was slated to be for a 25 September 2003, release date. Irtiqa, produced by Zulfiqa J. Khan, Fawad A. Khan and songwriter-producer Mekaal Hasan, became a critical acclaim in Pakistan and became one of the first mainstream concept album released by a Pakistani artist. Singles like "Waqt", "Hamesha", "Aghosh" and "Kahan Hai Tu" all topped the local music charts. The single "Waqt" also charted at top in India. Irtiqa, meaning progression, revolved around a theme of evolution. The sound of the album is very melodic and doom paced, influenced by heavy metal and progressive rock, heavily relied on fast keyboards and drums and heavy guitar riffs. The band also went on a tour all across the country to promote their debut album release.

On 2 February 2005, Entity Paradigm performed a charity concert for the Indian Ocean earthquake and tsunami victims along with Junoon, Call and Jal at Alhamra Auditorium in Lahore.

=== Disbanding and subsequent projects (2007–2008) ===
On 9 January 2007, Entity Paradigm had an interview with "Images" (Karachi's Dawn newspaper) in which they announced that the band would disband due to various members aiming to pursue different projects. Early reports from the band hinted towards an album release in late 2004, thus far Irtiqa is the only album to be released by Entity Paradigm which is distributed by Lips Records.

After the group's breakup, Zulfiqar J. Khan and Waqar A. Khan joined Call and Zulfiqar J. Khan directed a new single, "Shayad" which top the charts and Call released their debut album Jilawatan. Later on Waqar subsequently left the band. Fawad A. Khan continued his acting career. He first appeared in the second highest-grossing film of Pakistan, Khuda Kay Liye. Salman Albert, Waqar A. Khan and Hassan Khalid accompanied Ahmed Ali Butt to form a new band, Rubberband and released a new single "Chall". Ahmed Ali Butt continued working on other projects like Rubberband and worked for television channels including AAG TV and WikkidPlus.

=== Reunion (2009) ===
On 12 March 2009, Entity Paradigm announced its official return by performing for the first time in over four years. The performance was held at LUMS and was attended by an enthusiastic audience. Without Xulfi and Sajjad A. Khan, the current formation of the band includes Fawad Khan on rhythm guitar and vocals, and Ahmed Ali Butt on keyboards and vocals, Hassan Khalid on bass, Salman Albert on lead guitars, and Waqar Khan on drums. Unfortunately, the reunion did not make big news in the press and media.

Shortly after their reunion, they went on performing in Karachi at Ramada Hotel on 1 May, where the band debuts their new song "Shor Macha". They also announced that their second album will be released in December 2010. On 28 June, Entity Paradigm was going to make the long-awaited comeback at Lok Virsa Theater, Islamabad, but did not play at their gig at the concert which created chaos among fans. In response to the violence, Fawad Afzal Khan, the lead vocalist of the band, responded that it was due to mismanagement of the organizers the band was not able to perform at the concert.

=== Ushering a new revival (2010–2015) ===
On 13 February 2010, Entity Paradigm along with Bilal Khan performed at Lahore Grammar School (Defence Phase V Branch) in Lahore. In February, news broke about Entity Paradigm taking part in the Coke Studio the third season and were found jamming with Arif Lohar at Coke Studio in Karachi. It was also reported that they are going to perform a song together. On 20 February, the band announced that they will be shooting the video of their new single "Shor Macha" and through Facebook invited fans to take part in the shooting of the music video. On 26 February, Entity Paradigm again performed at Lahore Grammar School (Johar Town Branch) in Lahore. On 21 March, EP performed at the Battle Field Arena and then on Pakistan Day, 23 March, the band performed at LUMS one year after their reunion there.

On 15 May, the lineup for Coke Studio confirmed that Entity Paradigm will feature in the third season along with many well known artists and bands like Noori, Aunty Disco Project, Karavan, Abida Parveen and many other successful musicians. On 8 June, it was confirmed that EP will perform at the Coke Studio second session along with Noori, Zeb and Haniya, Amanat Ali, Fakir Juman Shah and Rizwan & Muazzam. On 20 June, EP paid tribute to Sajjad Ali by performing the song "Bolo Bolo" at the Coke Studio third season second session, "Will".

On 24 July, Entity Paradigm performed at the Saintt Mary's Academy Rawalpindi. It was the first time that the band performed after their reunion, in Rawalpindi, Punjab. On 2 August, the band went on to perform at BMUN (Beaconhouse Model United Nations) 2010 held in the capital city, Islamabad. On 7 August, the band performed at the Carlton Hotel, Karachi along with Overload and Strings in Karachi. On 13 August, Entity Paradigm released "Shor Macha" as the first single from their upcoming second studio album, the music video of the song was a dedication to all Pakistanis. The music video of the song was sponsored by djuice and directed by Bilal Lashari. On 7 October, the band released the first teaser of their upcoming documentary, Kuch Shor Macha - The Documentary, directed by Syed Atef Amjad Ali. Two days later, the band released another teaser of their upcoming documentary. On 26 December, in an online poll by Dawn News, the band's video for their single, "Shor Macha", was voted as the second-best music video of 2010.

On 24 May 2011, Entity Paradigm confirmed, through their Facebook page, that they are working on new tracks and will release a new track Ajab Tamasha soon. In September, EP's music video for their single "Shor Macha" directed by Bilal Lashari was nominated for the "Best Music Video" award at the Lux Style Awards.

On 18 May 2012, Entity Paradigm confirmed, through their Facebook page, that lead vocalist, Fawad Khan have left the band to pursue his acting career and also, the band confirmed the departure of drummer Waqar Ahmed Khan who moved to Islamabad from Lahore. The three remaining band members, Ahmed Ali Butt, Hassaan Khalid, and Salman Albert confirmed that the trio are working on new material and will shortly release a music video of their new single, "Ajab Tamasha".

On 1 December, Entity Paradigm released their single "Ajab Tamasha" which featured Overload's vocalist and drummer Farhad Humayun on drums. The song was released as a celebration of EP's 10th anniversary as a band.

Afterward the band started launching a promo for a new song titled "Zaher", but its release had to be delayed due to members working on different projects. The song along with the music video was released in 2015 featuring Qurat-ul-Ain Balouch and Ahmed Ali Butt on vocals and Salman Albert on guitars and was not released as an EP song. The band went into hiatus, and a question mark was put on all EP projects.

Recently in 2017 at Pepsi Battle of the Bands season 2, EP made a surprise comeback in this year's installment, leaving the audience longing for more. They performed their song Hamesha.

== Discography ==
Studio albums

- Irtiqa (2003)

== Videography ==
- Irtiqa Live & Plugged DVD (2005)

== Band members ==
Final Line-up

- Fawad Afzal Khan – rhythm guitar, vocals (2000–2007, 2009–2012, 2017)
- Ahmed Ali Butt – vocals (2000–2007, 2009–2015, 2017)
- Zulfiqar Jabbar Khan – lead guitar, vocals (2000–2007, 2017)
- Salman Albert – lead guitar, percussion, drums, vocals (2000–2007, 2009–2015, 2017)
- Hassaan Khalid – bass guitar, rhythm guitar (2000–2007, 2009–2015, 2017)
- Sajjad Ali Khan – bass guitar (2002–2007, 2017)

Former

- Asad Ali Khan - lead, rhythm and bass guitars, drums, percussion, backing vocals (2000–2002)
- Waqar Ahmed Khan – drums, percussion (2000–2007, 2009–2012)

== Awards and nominations ==
Year	Nominee / work	Award	Result
Indus Music Awards
2004	"Aghosh"	Best Alternative Song	Won
2005	"Waqt"	Best Rock Song	Won
Lux Style Awards
2006	"Irtiqa"	Best Music Video	Nominated
2010	"Shor Macha"	Best Music Video	Won

== See also ==
- List of Pakistani music bands
