= Irtiqa =

Studio album by Entity Paradigm
- Released: October 1, 2003
- Recorded: 2002–2003 at Digital Fidelity Studios in Lahore, Pakistan
- Length: 55:39
- Labels: Lips Records, Rearts Records
- Producers: Zulfiqar Jabbar Khan, Fawad Khan, Mekaal Hasan

Singles from Irtiqa
- 1. "Kahan Hai Tu" Released: 2003; 2. "Hamein Aazma" Released: 2003; 3. "Aghosh" Released: 2003; 4. "Hamesha" Released: 2004; 5. "Waqt" Released: 2004; 6. "Irtiqa III" Released: 2005

External audio
- Audio Jukebox playlist on YouTube

Professional ratings
Review scores
Source	Rating
Desiest.com	7.3/10 link
Pakistani Music Channel	link
Ultimate-guitar	link

Irtiqa (Urdu: ارتقاء, literal English translation: evolution) is the debut album by the Pakistani rock-metal band, Entity Paradigm. It was released in 2003, after Entity Paradigm lost in the finale of the first-ever Pepsi Battle of the Bands. The album was a critical and commercial success.

Popular singles from Irtiqa include "Hamesha", "Waqt", and "Kahan Hai Tu". At the time, actor and singer Fawad Khan was the lead vocalist, with Xulfi Khan as the lead guitarist.

== Track listing ==
All music composed and arranged by Zulfiqar Jabbar Khan, Fawad Khan and Ahmed Ali Butt.

Irtiqa
No.	Title	Writer(s)	Length
1.	"Irtiqa I"	Zulfiqar Jabbar Khan	2:19
2.	"Hamein Aazma"	Ahmed Ali Butt	4:46
3.	"Kahan Hai Tu"	Zulfiqar Jabbar Khan, Ahmed Ali Butt	4:14
4.	"Hamesha"	Zulfiqar Jabbar Khan, Ahmed Ali Butt, Ali A. Khan	4:57
5.	"Waqt"	Ahmed Ali Butt, Danish J. Khan	6:41
6.	"Aghosh"	Ali A. Khan	6:15
7.	"Irtiqa II"	Zulfiqar Jabbar Khan	1:05
8.	"Rahguzar"	Fawad Khan, Salman Nasir	6:27
9.	"Fitrat"	Ahmed Ali Butt	4:17
10.	"Barzakh"	Zulfiqar Jabbar Khan	7:44
11.	"Irtiqa III"	Danish J. Khan	8:29

== Personnel ==
All information is taken from the CD.

Entity Paradigm

- Fawad Khan: lead vocals
- Waqar Ahmed Khan: drums
- Zulfiqar Jabbar Khan: lead guitar, vocals
- Ahmed Ali Butt: vocals, keyboard
- Salman Albert: rhythm, vocals, drums
- Sajjad Ali Khan: bass guitar
- Hassan Khalid: rhythm guitar

Production

- Produced by Mekaal Hasan, Fawad Khan & Zulfiqar J. Khan
- Recorded & Mixed at Digital Fidelity Studios, Lahore, Punjab
- Guitar sound engineer: Mekaal Hasan, Fawad Khan & Zulfiqar
- Drums reprogrammed: Fawad Khan
- Drums sound engineer: Fawad Khan & Zulfiqar J. Khan
- Assisted by Mekaal Hasan
- Photography: Usman Saeed
- Art direction & design: Safwat Saleem
- Album art: Tania Danish
- Inlay illustrations: Safwat Saleem
