= Call (band) =

Pakistani rock band

- Origin: Lahore, Punjab, Pakistan
- Genres: Rock
- Years active: 1994–2001; 2002–present
- Labels: Sadaf Stereo; Fire Records
- Members: Junaid Khan; Zulfiqar Jabbar Khan; Sultan Raja
- Past members: Waqar Khan; Omer Pervaiz; Danish Jabbar Khan; Nadeem; Nauman Chatha; Sunny; Usman Nasir; Shahzad Hameed; Khurram Jabbar Khan

Call (Urdu: کال) is a Pakistani rock band from Lahore, Pakistan. The current line-up was formed in 2002, the group consists of Junaid Khan (lead vocalist), Zulfiqar J. Khan (lead guitar, producer) and Muhammad Sultan Raja (rhythm guitar).

Call's musical style has remained predominately alternative rock, with some commercial mainstream ballads centered on Junaid's powerful expressive vocals, melancholic soundscapes, intricate guitar riffs and iconic drum beats. Their lyrics, often embellished with imagery, focus on themes such as identity, patriotism and longing. Popular for their live performances, the group have staged several lighting sequences and powerful drum sections. The band became noted for their refusal to adhere to traditional pre-recorded performances, and generating the #Asliwalalive (meaning "the real live") a nod to their live and electrifying performances.

The band's song "Kal Hamara Hai", a promotional song for Warid Telecom (Pakistan), 2006, "Nishaan" Album Jilawatan was released through various online music platforms and gained widespread fame. It went on to top the charts and also won the band its first award; Best Rock Song at the Band Baja Awards 2003. Indus Music made a live video of the song which was to be exclusively aired on the channel itself. Call then came up with a second single titled "Pukaar", which came with a music video, eventually won then Indus Music Award for the Best Alternative Rock Song. The next song that released "Shayad" again garnered massive praise with its distinct video and high octane vocals.

In early 2007, Call released a song named Laree Chotee (sung by Zulfiqar Jabbar Khan) for the Bollywood film titled Ek Chalis Ki Last Local. The song introduced the band to a much diverse audience and a frenzied fan following ensued. Till this day it is a popular public demand at their concert performances.

After a hiatus of three years the band put on an explosive performance at the semi-final of Pepsi Battle of the Bands (Pakistan) with a re-imagined version of their song "Jilawatan". The song was received with a frenzy and the electrifying performance was nostalgic for the first generation fans and won over the youth today.

In 2018, the band created a cricket anthem for Pakistan Super League team, Peshawar Zalmi. The song titled "Hum Zalmi" bought them critical praise from music critics to cricket fans alike. It was a fusion of their heavy metal signature music and the folk Peshawari beats to create a fresh and unique sound. A modern take on the traditional Pashtun Attun dance was used in the music video to symbolize a war cry.

On March 23 (Pakistan Day) 2018, the band made history with their single, "Zindabad" - The Drum Anthem. The band collaborated with 42 top drummers and percussionist of Pakistan for this project. Zindabad is a prayer, a chant to celebrate the freedom, hope and identity that binds Pakistanis as a nation. The song won over the hearts of the entire nation. The video was one of the fastest to reach 1 million views on Facebook of the music coming out of Pakistan.

== History ==
=== Early days (1994–2000) ===
Call was formed in 1994 by Zulfiqar J. Khan, Omer Pervaiz, Khurram J. Khan and Danish J. Khan. They started out by providing background music for mime performances at NCA, Lahore under the name Undrap Nexus. Undrap Nexus line-up was with Zulfiqar J. Khan on the keyboard, Omer Pervaiz on the guitar and Danish J. Khan on vocals. Soon, Zulfiqar J. Khan and Danish J. Khan, Khurram J. Khan was on drums and Call was officially formed.

Call's musical inspirations included bands like Pink Floyd, Led Zeppelin and Iron Maiden. Their musical style was experimental. The band's first gig was in 1995. The site was decorated with flame torches and complimenting the band's music were live mime performances. The band got its prominence for theatrical live performances and original music.

=== Disbanding (2001) ===
On 20 October 2001, Danish J. Khan, the band's vocalist and lyricist, performed for the last time with the band at a rock festival on his birthday. Once the band's primary lyricist and vocalist was gone, the members of the band got busy with other things. Khurram Jabbar Khan moved to the United States, Zulfiqar Jabbar Khan concentrated on his band Paradigm (which later became Entity Paradigm).

=== Revival (2002–2004) ===
In September 2002, Khurram Jabbar Khan, being a core member, returned from the United States to revive Call. Khurram Jabbar Khan auditioned for new band members and decided that this would be an Urdu project. With the help of his friend and band member, Nauman, a dental student, they found Junaid Khan's voice fit the vision for the band's musical direction and recruited him as the band's vocalist. Soon Sunny was chosen to be on guitars with Nauman. The band played a few gigs in Lahore with the new line up to rave reviews due the band's chemistry and Junaid's crisp raw vocals. During this time, on a cold December night at Khurram Jabbar Khan's house, the band composed Call's first song called Nishaan. After Nauman left for the United States to pursue dentistry, Usman Nasir was added on rhythms and Sultan Raja on bass. The band then entered mainstream commercial music.

"Nishaan" was released through various Pakistani music websites and gained widespread fame. It went on to top the charts and also won the band its first award; Best Rock Song at the Band Baja Awards 2003 Indus Music made a live video of the song which was to be exclusively aired on the channel itself. Call then came up with a second single titled "Pukaar", which came with a promotional video, eventually won the Indus Music Award for the Best Alternative Rock Song. The band then released an unplugged song titled "Kaash".

Soon Khurram J. Khan had to part roles with the band because he had to run Jilawatan Productions, the company which used to manage Entity Paradigm, Jal, Call and Roxen. Another shake in the line up became inevitable with the band now without a lead guitar.

Waqar Khan (on Drums) and Zulfiqar J. Khan (Lead Guitars) from the band Entity Paradigm which at that moment was going through a crisis of its own joined the line –up for Call. A new single was released and was accompanied by a video. The song was titled "Shayad" and topped the charts.

=== Jilawatan (2005) ===
With all the band members in sync, Call started recording their debut album, Jilawatan. The album was finally released in November 2005 and immediately topped the Vibes charts. A string of hits followed with two predominant music styles hardcore rock, the title track” jilawatan’, “Kuch Nahin’ and lyrical ballads "Sab Bhula Kai" and Bicher kai Bhee.

“Sab bhula kai” was an instant hit with the video directed by Sohail Javed.

=== Success (2006–2007) ===
The band then involved themselves in a number of collaborations and released several songs on their fansite. The first of was a national/patriotic song, "Kal Hamara Hai" made for Warid Telecom and was released on 23 March (Pakistan Day). An acoustic version of Kal Hamara Hai was also released through their fansite. A second song, titled Rang Dau, was also recorded for Warid Telecom and was used in Warid Telecom ads.

In early 2007, Call released a song named Laree Chotee for the Bollywood flick titled Ek Chalis Ki Last Local and a video followed the audio release which was an international hit.

During the 2007 Cricket World Cup, Call recorded and made a video for a song entitled "Humse He Ye Zamaana". It was an anthem which resonated with both cricket fans and the youth alike.

=== Dhoom (2009) ===
Call released three smash hit singles; "Ho Jaane De", "Yeh Pal" and "Dhadke Jiya", the latter two being tapped into by Bollywood as soundtracks for two different movies, which topped the charts and received positive reviews. A slight detour in the band’s musical style could be observed as they went more mainstream with their next projects. "Dhadke Jiya" did well but Laree Chooti" went widespread and opened up audiences across the border as well. Their next single "Aasmaan", shot onsite of Risalpur airbase returned to the powerful patriotic anthems.

"Ho Jaane De" for Cornetto was also featured on their album Dhoom. The single was widely appreciated throughout the continent. The song was awarded 'Tune of the Month' by BBC Asia and was also used in the Wall's ice cream advertisement in which the band members have also modelled.

On 26 January 2011, Call released their second studio album along with a pop rock single, "Mein Aisa Hee Hoon", from the album. Dhoom was received to mixed views. In 2012, the band was nominated for the best album award at the Lux Style Awards 2012.

=== Reunion ===
In 2016, the band came back with a bang by releasing a tribute videos for their fans “ Teri Har hum” and continued performing in concerts. The band featured as the celebrity artist in the semi-final of the “Pepsi Battle of the Bands” performed a rendition of their song "Jilawatan" live in 2017. The level of sophistication seen in the production of their song "Jilawatan" was unrivalled and the band got critical acclaim both locally and internationally.

They performed at the international Oslo Music Mela 2017 to a heartwarming response. The band went on to release more singles in 2018. The first song was the anthem for PSL Peshawar cricket team Hum Zalmi. Sticking to their heavy rock roots yet representing the beauty of Peshawer they delivered a lovely melody. The video was directed by Murtaza Niaz with appearances by celebrities “Mahira Khan” and Hamza Ali Abbasi. The song played became synonymous with the PSL cricket games.

The next song was released on 23 March 2018. Pakistan Zindabad which cemented their return as a serious confirmation to the music industry. This song shot at the historic Bradlaugh Hall involved 42 Pakistani drummers & percussionist. The sheer scale of the musical arrangement and the number of musicians involved was awe-inspiring and quickly became the most popular viewed song on Facebook in Pakistan. Their return has shown a much evolved approach to their brand Call has simply endeared to new and old fans alike.

== Discography ==
=== Albums ===
Year	Title	Label
2005	Jilawatan	Sadaf Stereo
2011	Dhoom	Fire Records

=== Bollywood ===
Year	Song	Film
2007	Laree Chootee	Ek Chalis Ki Last Local
2009	Yeh Pal	Aasma
2009	Dharkay Jiya	Aloo Chaat

=== Singles ===
Year	Title	Detail(s)
2006	"Kal Hamara Hai"	Warid Telecom
2010	"Badal Do Zamana"	Pakistan's T20 World Cup Official Song
2018	"Peshawar Zalmi Anthem"	Pakistan Super League
2018	"Zindabad" featuring the Drummers of Pakistan	Drum anthem and chant prayer for Pakistan

== Band members ==
Current

- Junaid Khan – lead vocals
- Zulfiqar Jabbar Khan – Lead guitars, Songwriter
- Sultan Raja – bass guitar, rhythm guitar

Live line up

- Bass- Syed Farhan Ali
- Bilalwal Lahooti – Drums
- Violin – Sharoon Leo
- Guitar Tech & Stage – Umar Lahooti
- Sound Engineer – Sherry Khattak

Former

- Waqar Khan – drums
- Shahzad Hameed – bass guitar
- Omer Pervaiz – lead guitar
- Ahsan Fida Khan – lead guitar
- Faisal Murtaza – bass
- Danish Jabbar Khan – vocals
- Khurram Jabbar Khan – drums
- Nauman Chatha- lead guitar
- Sunny – lead guitar
- Usman Nasir – rhythm guitar

Sessional

- Farhan – bass guitar
- Kenny – drums

== Music videos ==
- "Nishaan" (2003) from Jilawatan
- "Pukaar" (2003) from Jilawatan
- "Shayad" (2004) from Jilawatan
- "Sab Bhula Kai" (2005) from Jilawatan
- "Bichar Kai Bhee" (2006) from Jilawatan
- "Kuch Naheen" (2006) from Jilawatan
- "Kal Hamara Hai" (2006)
- "Hum Se Hai Yeh Zamaana" (2007)
- "Laree Chotee" (2007)
- "Aasmaan" (2007)
- "Dhadke Jiya"(Aloo Chaat)(2009)
- "Ho Jaane De" (2009)
- "Badal Do Zamanay Ko"(2010)
- "Main Aisa Hi hoon" (2011)
- "Teri Haar Hum" (2017)
- "Hum Zalmi" (2018)
- "Zindabad" (2018)

== Awards and nominations ==
2nd Jazz IM Awards

Best Debut - Pukaar

Best Solo - Sub Bhula Kai

3rd Jazz IM Awards

Best Ballad - Sab Bhula Kai

Best Alternative Rock Song - Pukaar

Lux Style Awards

Best Album - Jilawatan

Best Album - Dhoom

The Musik Awards

Best Ballad - Sab Bhula Kai

Best Album - Jilawatan

Best Lyrics - Zulfiqar 'Xulfi' J. Khan

Best Music Producer - Zulfiqar 'Xulfi' J. Khan

== See also ==
- List of Pakistani music bands
