= Aloo Chaat (film) =

2009 Indian Hindi-language romantic comedy film

- Promotional poster
- Directed by: Robbie Grewal
- Written by: Divy Nidhi Sharma
- Produced by: Anuj Saxena; A.P. Pairagi; Gary S.
- Starring: Aftab Shivdasani; Aamna Shariff; Linda Arsenio; Kulbhushan Kharbanda; Manoj Pahwa; Sanjay Mishra
- Cinematography: Sanjay Kapoor
- Edited by: Aarif Sheikh
- Music by: RDB; Xulfi; Vipin Mishra; Mehfuz Maruf
- Production companies: Mirchi Movies; Maverick Productions; Red Ice Productions
- Distributed by: PVR Pictures
- Release date: 20 March 2009
- Running time: 110 minutes
- Country: India
- Language: Hindi

Aloo Chaat is a 2009 Indian Hindi-language romantic comedy film starring Aftab Shivdasani, Aamna Sharif, Linda Arsenio, Kulbhushan Kharbanda, Sanjai Mishra, and Manoj Pahwa. The film is directed by Robbie Grewal. It was released in India in March 2009.

== Plot ==
Nikhil returns to his house in Lajpat Nagar after completing his education in the United States. His orthodox Punjabi family, consisting of his father Purushottam, his grandmother Beeji, his confused mother Seeto, and an always suspicious uncle Chhadami Mama, are keen to get him married and scout potential matches. Nikhil, however, does not show an interest in marriage, which has the family worried about their son's orientation. Purushottam requests his family friend Hakim, a sexologist by profession, to try to get Nikhil to open up about marriage.

Nikhil reveals to Hakim that he's already in love with a Muslim girl, Aamna, living in the U.S. Being rooted in old traditions, he fears his family will never accept a Muslim daughter-in-law and has hence kept the matter hidden. Having no qualms with the match himself, Hakim devises a strategy to get Nikhil's family to accept Aamna. The plan involves Nikhil professing to marry an American girl and introducing Aamna to his family as the girl's close friend. They would then portray the American girl in a bad light and Aamna in a good light to help sway his family's opinion. With help from Hakim's regular patient Sukha Paaji, they settle on Nikki, an American girl with strong Indian values, who both Nikhil and Hakim train to come across as a bit spoiled. Nikhil also photoshops images for Nikki's childhood album and, together with Hakim, comes up with a fake history for Nikki.

Although initially against it, Nikhil's family agrees to his choice after some convincing from Hakim. Nikhil brings Nikki and Aamna to his house, the former pretending to arrive from the airport, a ruse that is almost caught by Chhadami. As days progress, Nikki tries to come across as a poor choice for Nikhil by such acts as cooking American food, wearing skimpy western outfits, and acting irresponsibly, while Aamna remedies these by cooking Punjabi food (which the family relishes after initial hesitation), wearing Indian outfits, and being responsible and caring. Nikki even gets herself a sunbath in a bikini at the house's rooftop, inviting several unwanted stares, and is admonished for this by Aamna in the presence of Nikhil's father. Gradually, she starts winning over the family members, although Chhadami stays suspicious of their motives.

Nikhil's plan hits a snag when the astrologer called to select an auspicious marriage date chooses one just four days ahead. In a last-ditch effort to throw the wedding off, the trio decides to hire a woman to play Nikki's mother, having her object to her "daughter's" marriage, but are apparently unsuccessful in their attempts.

While watching a cricket match with the family, Purushottam looks at cricketer Michael Clarke and recalls seeing his picture somewhere. Chhadami screams that the picture was on Nikki's childhood album. Immediately, Purushottam gets a cardiac arrest. He is examined by a doctor, who advises against giving him any stress. Purushottam proposes getting Nikhil married the next day in court itself. Nikhil locks Chhadami in a room to stall him from making any reservations, but Purushottam has already taken care of the marriage dates. Resigned to their fates, Nikhil, Nikki, and Aamna head to court, unable to find a way out.

Confusion abounds at the court as two women show up claiming to be Nikki's mother, objecting to the marriage. Chhadami, who has been able to free himself, rushes to the court to warn Purushottam of Nikhil's scheme. A smiling Purushottam is seen coming out of the court having wed Nikhil and Aamna. He explains he had gotten wind of Nikhil's plan after seeing the cricketer's picture and was able to connect the dots. He then cooked up his own scheme to get Nikhil and Aamna married. The family welcomes Aamna with open arms, and they all head to a food stall near their house to have their regular snack: aloo chaat.

== Cast ==
Actor	Role
Aftab Shivdasani	Nikhil
Aamna Shariff	Aamna
Linda Arsenio	Nikki
Kulbhushan Kharbanda	Puroshottum
Manoj Pahwa	Hakim
Dolly Ahluwalia	Beeji
Meenakshi Sethi	Seeto
Sanjay Mishra	Chhadami mama
Brijendra Kala	Small Role

== Soundtrack ==
Aloo Chaat

Soundtrack album by T-Series
- Released: 12 February 2009 (India)
- Genre: Feature film soundtrack
- Label: T-Series
- Producer: Maverick Productions

T-Series chronology
Dhoondte Reh Jaoge (2009)	Aloo Chaat (2009)	Gulaal (2009)

Song	Singer(s)	Duration
"Aloo Chaat"	RDB & Nindy Kaur, Smooth	5:09
"Dhadke Jiya"	Xulfi	4:40
"Aloo Chaat Aloo Chaat"	Kailash Kher	3:29
"Boliyaan" (Giddha)	RDB & Nindy Kaur	4:27
"Life Is A Sizzling Aloo Chaat"	Kunal Ganjawala	4:06
"Dhadke Jiya" (Remix)	Xulfi	3:24
"Boliyaan" (Giddha) (2nd Version)	Nindy Kaur	3:34
"Aloo Chaat Aloo Chaat" (Remix)	Kailash Kher	3:16

== Reception ==
The film received mixed reviews from critics. Taran Adarsh of Bollywood Hungama called the film "Below Average" stating, "Aloo Chaat suffers due to one major reason: It just doesn’t hold your attention. The screenplay [Divya Nidhi Sharma] relies on the same old tricks and the same old situations that we’ve watched over and over again. You do smile at times not because the scenes are funny, but because the dialogues are witty". He gave the film 1.5 stars out of 5. Elvis D'Silva of Rediff also gave the film 1.5 stars out of 5 stating, "It would be interesting to see what these two rumoured real-life lovebirds would be able to do with a script that actually gave their characters a narrative arc and told a story through them. Aloo Chaat unfortunately is not that script, or film. Those venturing into a cinema to watch this, do so at their own peril."

On the other hand, Nikhat Kazmi reviewing for The Times of India gave the film three stars out of five, calling it fairly enjoyable. She added, "So what do we have here? A spoof on the East versus West debate along with an effortless plea for integration. Appetising fare."
