= Aasma: The Sky Is the Limit =

2009 film

- Directed by: Rohit Nayyar
- Screenplay by: Faizan Kareem, Shubh Mukherjee
- Cinematography: Akashdeep Pandey
- Edited by: Kuldip Mehan
- Music by: Mohammed Afsar, Sajid Ali, Shubh
- Release date: 23 January 2009
- Running time: 4 hours
- Country: India
- Language: Hindi

Aasma: The Sky Is the Limit is a Bollywood film released on 23 January 2009.

== Plot ==
It is a story about a theatre group composed of college students who are talented and aspiring actors. They are unable to get acting offers and then their main sponsor (Sachin Khedekar) backs out of the group. From then on, the group tries to overcome several hurdles, and all of a sudden, it is discovered that the main character Shubh has HIV disease.

== Cast ==
- Seema Biswas
- Hrishitaa Bhatt

== Soundtrack ==
Music direction for the film was provided by Sajid Ali and Mohammed Afsar. Rahat Fateh Ali Khan provided vocals. Other singers include KK, Shaan, Kailash Kher, Mahalaxmi Iyer and Debojit. Call (band) was also involved in the music of this film as well as Xulfi.

No.	Title	Singer(s)	Length
1.	"Aasma" (Sad Version)	Kailash Kher
2.	"Man Bawra" (Lounge Mix)	Shafqat Amanat Ali
3.	"Aasma" (Club Mix)	Kailash Kher
4.	"Ye Pal Aasma" (Remix)	Xulfi
5.	"Chalte Rehien"	Debojit, Mahalaxmi Iyer
6.	"Man Bawra"	Rahat Fateh Ali Khan
7.	"Aasma"	KK, Shaan, Mahalaxmi Iyer
8.	"Ye Pal Aasma"	Xulfi
