= Neha Dhupia =

Indian actress and model (born 1980)

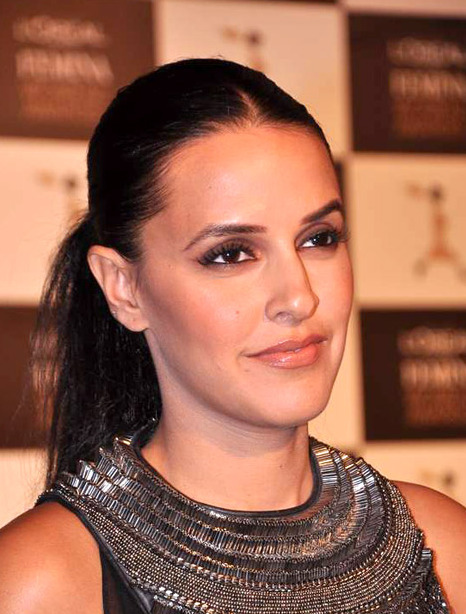
- Dhupia in 2013
- Born: 27 August 1980 (age 46); Kochi, Kerala, India
- Occupations: Actress, model
- Height: 5 ft 6 in (168 cm)
- Spouse: Angad Bedi (m. 2018)
- Children: 2
- Beauty pageant titleholder
- Years active: 2000–present
- Major competitions: Femina Miss India 2002 (Winner); Miss Universe 2002; (Top-10 finalist)

Neha Dhupia (born 27 August 1980) is an Indian actress, model and beauty pageant titleholder. She won the title of Femina Miss India in 2002 and represented India at Miss Universe 2002. She is primarily known for her work in Hindi films and television.

Dhupia made her acting debut with the Telugu film Ninne Istapaddanu (2003) and her Hindi debut with Qayamat: City Under Threat (2003), receiving nomination for Filmfare Award for Best Female Debut. Her notable films include: Kyaa Kool Hai Hum (2005), Chup Chup Ke (2006), Ek Chalis Ki Last Local (2007), Singh Is Kinng (2008), De Dana Dan (2009), Tumhari Sulu (2017) and A Thursday (2022).

Beside films, Dhupia is known for her role as a Gang leader in MTV Roadies. She is married to actor Angad Bedi, with whom she has two children.

== Early life and career ==
Dhupia was born on 27 August 1980, in Kochi, Kerala. She graduated from Jesus and Mary College in Delhi.

Dhupia made her acting debut in a play in New Delhi called Graffiti. Thereafter she appeared in a music video for Indipop band Euphoria and modeled for advertisement campaigns. She then appeared in the TV serial Rajdhani. In 2002, she participated in the Femina Miss India pageant, where she was crowned as Miss India 2002. She was subsequently sent to the Miss Universe 2002 pageant in Puerto Rico where she placed in the top 10. After placing in the pageant, Dhupia intended to pursue a career in the Indian Foreign Service, but turned to acting instead.

== Acting career ==
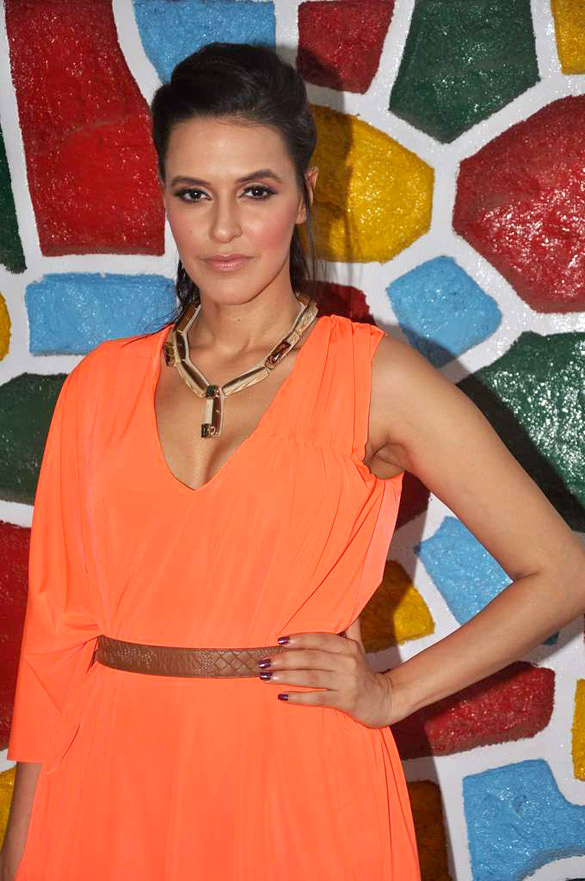
Dhupia at an event in 2012

Dhupia made her Hindi film debut with the 2003 film Qayamat: City Under Threat opposite Ajay Devgn. The film was a moderate success at the box office and earned her nomination for Filmfare Award for Best Female Debut. She rose to fame with her title role in Julie, and then appeared in Sheesha (2005) in a dual role of twin sisters, but it did not do well at the box office.

In the following years, Dhupia earned recognition with her key roles in the films: Kyaa Kool Hai Hum (2005), Chup Chup Ke (2006), Ek Chalis Ki Last Local (2007), Singh Is Kinng (2008), De Dana Dan (2009), Tumhari Sulu (2017) and A Thursday (2022). Among these films, Singh Is Kinng, De Dana Dan and Tumhari Sulu, emerged as commercial success and her highest grossing films.

Reviewing her performance in the 2007 film Ek Chalis Ki Last Local, Khalid Mohamed stated, "Neha is likeable and consistently in the skin of her part." Dhupia played a pregnant police officer in the 2022 film A Thursday. Renuka Vyavahare noted, "Neha plays a significant characters and render a powerful performance." The film earned her the Filmfare OTT Award for Best Supporting Actress – Web Original Film nomination.

Beginning from 2016, Dhupia has appeared as a Gang Leader in the reality show MTV Roadies. Her gang member emerged as the winner in 2017 and 2018. In 2018, Dhupia turned host for the reality series Styled By Neha. In 2025, Dhupia made her streaming debut with Single Papa, playing an adoption center head.

== Other work and media image ==
In the Times Most Desirable Women list, she was placed 49th in 2010. In 2011, Dhupia was placed in NDTV's "Bollywood's Most Beautiful Women" list. Dhupia has modeled on the runway for designers such as Rohit Bal and D'damas.

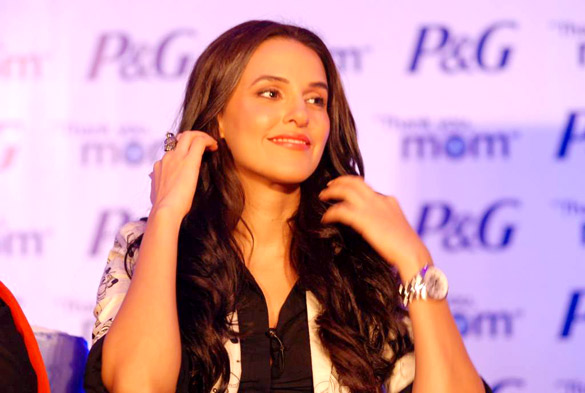
Dhupia at an event for P & G

Dhupia has run in the Mumbai Marathon to support the Concern India Foundation and helped to raise over 5 lakhs. She also helped to raise money for victims of the 2011 Sikkim earthquake. In 2016, Dhupia conceptualized and hosted a Bollywood podcast called #NoFilterNeha on the Indian music app Saavn, in which she interviews Bollywood celebrities. The show received positive reviews, with over 2.3 million listeners. Dhupia debuted season four in November 2019 and planned to expand the podcast into a web series.

== Personal life ==
Dhupia married actor Angad Bedi in a private ceremony at a Gurudwara on 10 May 2018. On 18 November 2018, she gave birth to a girl named Mehr Dhupia Bedi. Dhupia was fat-shamed for her post-pregnancy weight gains by certain sections of the media in 2019. On 19 July 2021, she and Angad announced that they are expecting their second child with an Instagram post. She gave birth to her second child, a boy on 3 October 2021 and named him Guriq Singh Dhupia Bedi.

== Filmography ==
Key
†	Denotes films that have not yet been released

=== Films ===
Year	Title	Role	Notes
1994	Minnaram	Child Artist	Malayalam film
2000	Ninja Odoru! Ninja Densetsu	Meena	Japanese film
2003	Ninne Istapaddanu		Telugu film
2003	Qayamat: City Under Threat	Sapna	Bollywood debut
2003	Miss India: The Mystery		
2003	Villain	Aisha	Telugu film
2004	Julie	Julie	
2004	Rakht: What If You Can See the Future	Rhea Trehan	
2005	Siskiyaan	Ayesha Sheikh	
2005	Sheesha	Sia/Ria Malhotra	Dual role
2005	Kyaa Kool Hai Hum	Dr. Rekha	
2005	Garam Masala	Maggi	Cameo
2006	Fight Club: Members Only	Komal	
2006	Teesri Aankh: The Hidden Camera	Sanpa	
2006	Chup Chup Ke	Meenakshi	
2006	Utthaan	Kiran Talreja	
2007	Delhii Heights	Suhana	
2007	Ek Chalis Ki Last Local	Madhu	
2007	Shootout at Lokhandwala	Rohini	
2007	Heyy Babyy	Special appearance in song	
2007	Dus Kahaniyaan		Segment: Strangers in the Night
2008	Rama Rama Kya Hai Drama	Shanti	
2008	Mithya	Sonam	
2008	Kabhi Pyar Na Karna		Pakistani film in Urdu
2008	De Taali	Sara	Special appearance
2008	Singh Is Kinng	Julie	
2008	Dasvidaniya	Neha Bhanot	
2008	Maharathi	Mallika	
2009	Paying Guests	Aarti Gupta	
2009	Bollywood Hero	Lalima Lakhani	Indian-American miniseries
2009	De Dana Dan	Anu Chopra	
2009	Raat Gayi Baat Gayi?	Sophia	
2010	Action Replayy	Mona	
2010	Phas Gaye Re Obama	Munni (Gangster)	
2011	Parama Veera Chakra	Razia Sultana	Telugu film
2011	Dear Friend Hitler	Eva Braun	Amrapali Media Vision film
2011	Pappu Can't Dance Saala	Mehak Malvade	
2012	Maximum	Supriya	
2012	I M 24	Sheela	
2012	Kismet Love Paisa Dilli	Cameo	
2012	Rush	Lisa Kapoor	
2013	Rangeelay	Simmy	Punjabi film
2014	Double Di Trouble	Herself	Special appearance in song "Lak Tunu Tunu"
2014	Ungli	Teestha	
2014	Ekkees Toppon Ki Salaami	Jayaprabha	
2016	Santa Banta Pvt Ltd	Kareena Roy	
2016	Moh Maya Money	Divya	
2016	Ae Dil Hai Mushkil	Voice	
2017	Hindi Medium	Mrs. Aarti Suri	
2017	Tumhari Sulu	Maria	
2017	Qarib Qarib Singlle	Cameo	
2018	Lust Stories	Rekha	Karan Johar's segment
2018	Helicopter Eela	Lisa Marine	
2020	Devi	Unnamed	Short film
2021	Sanak	ACP Jayati Bhargav	
2022	A Thursday	ACP Catherine Alvarez	
2024	Bad Newz	Ma Carona	
2026	Don't Be Shy	Nandini Verma	

=== Television ===
Year	Title	Role	Notes
2000	Rajdhani		
2001	Ssshhhh...Koi Hai	Archana	
2011	Comedy Circus	Host/presenter	1 episode
2013	Nautanki: The Comedy Theatre	Herself	Team Owner
2014	CEO's Got Talent	Judge	1 Season
2016–2025	MTV Roadies	Gang Leader	
2017	Chhote Miyan Dhakkad	Judge	
2017	BFFs with Vogue	Host	
2018	Styled By Neha	Host	

=== Web series ===
Year	Title	Role	Notes
2025	Single Papa	Romilla Nehra	Netflix series
2025	Perfect Family	Megha	YouTube series

== Awards and nominations ==
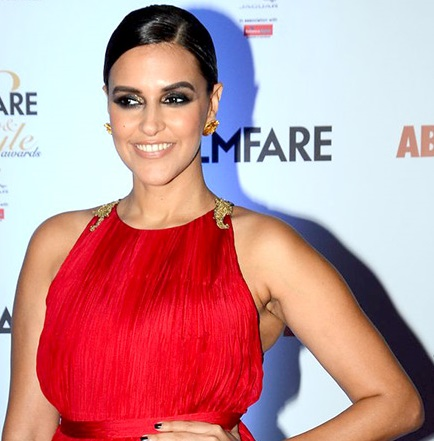
Dhupia at the Filmfare Style Awards, 2016

Won

- 2017: Screen Award for Best Supporting Actress for Tumhari Sulu.
- 2026: Pinkvilla Screen and Style Icons Award for Best Supporting Actor OTT – Female.

Nominated

- 2004: Filmfare Award for Best Female Debut for Qayamat: City Under Threat.
- 2022: Filmfare OTT Award for Best Supporting Actress – Web Original Film for A Thursday.

== See also ==
- List of Indian film actresses
- Femina Miss India

Awards and achievements
Preceded by (Puerto Rico) Denise Quiñones	Miss Universe Top 10; 2002	Succeeded by (Dominican Republic) Amelia Vega
Preceded by Celina Jaitly	Miss India Universe; 2002	Succeeded by Nikita Anand
