= Jilawatan =

Studio album by Call
- Released: November 20, 2005
- Recorded: 2002–2005
- Studio: Xth Harmonic Studio in Lahore, Pakistan
- Genres: Hard rock Alternative metal
- Length: 52:43
- Label: Sadaf Stereo
- Producer: Zufiqar J. Khan

Call chronology
Jilawatan (2005)	Dhoom (2011)

Singles from Jilawatan
- 1. "Nishaan" Released: 2003; 2. "Pukaar" Released: 2003; 3. "Shayad" Released: 2004; 4. "Sab Bhula Kai" Released: 2005; 5. "Bichar Kai Bhee" Released: 2006; 6. "Kuch Naheen" Released: 2006

Professional ratings
Review scores
Source	Rating
Pakistani Music Channel	4.5/5 stars

Jilawatan (Urdu: جلاوطن, literal English translation: exile) is the debut album of Pakistani rock band Call. It was released on November 20, 2005 and gained huge popularity. It was the second album produced by the band's guitarist, Xulfi. The album met critical acclaim, spending over a year on the Vibes Charts.

== Background ==
The word Jilawatan means exiled. The album uses the word jilawatan in the context of being exiled from one's own mind. Xulfi said of the band's name to MTV Moto:

"It's how the person himself feels, exiled from his own self, from his own thoughts, from his own perception and he thinks that he is alone and whatever he's thinking, he feels separated from the world. And that's what the album is all about. In another interview with Geo's High Voltage, Xulfi has said (translation), "The lyrics are written by my brother Haider who lives in Australia these days. Basically, most of it is his interpretation of life and what he has been through... in the sense that he has been living in Australia and he's away from his parents and everyone else... and he misses whatever experiences he had here, in Pakistan, and about now it's all having an impact on his life and the lyrics present a philosophical representation of whatever he's feeling."

The majority of the album is pretty heavy and features the drop-d tuning on guitar. The only exceptions to this are Sab Bhula Kai, Nishaan and Bichar Kai Bhee. Sab Bhula Kai and Bichar Kai Bhee feature guitars with the DADGAD (low to high) tuning whilst Nishaan's guitars feature the traditional EADGBE tuning. Almost all the tracks on the album have acoustic guitars except Shayad, Kuch Naheen, Jilawatan and Wujud and all of the tracks, with the exception of Pukaar and Jilawatan, feature guitar solos.

During live performances, the band plays several songs differently from the album. They usually include an unplugged version of Shayad, include a solo in Jilawatan, perform a completely different solo on Sab Bhula Kai and play the piano intro of Kismet a bit differently on guitars.

== Track listing ==
All songs composed and arranged by Zulfiqar J. Khan and Junaid Khan, except for Shayad and Bichar Kai Bhee music by Zulfiqar J. Khan and Jilawatan, Sab Bhula Kai and Wujud music by Sultan Raja, Zulfiqar J. Khan and Junaid Khan.

Jilawatan
No.	Title	Writer(s)	Length
1.	"Pukaar - پکار"	Haider J. Khan	4:14
2.	"Sab Bhula Kai - سب بھلا کے"	Junaid Khan	5:32
3.	"Shayad - شاید"	Haider J. Khan	4:53
4.	"Kaash - کاش"	Haider J. Khan	6:04
5.	"Kuch Naheen - کچھ نہیں"	Zulfiqar J. Khan, Haider J. Khan	3:53
6.	"Soch - سوچ"	Haider J. Khan	5:04
7.	"Jilawatan - جلاوطن"	Haider J. Khan	3:24
8.	"Nishaan - نشان"	Haider J. Khan	5:37
9.	"Bichar Kai Bhee - بچھڑ کے بھی"	Zufiqar J. Khan, Junaid Khan, Haider J. Khan	6:01
10.	"Kismet - قسمت"	Haider J. Khan	4:07
11.	"Wujud - وجود"	Haider J. Khan	3:47

== Personnel ==
Call

- Junaid Khan - lead vocals
- Zulfiqar J. Khan - lead guitar, bass guitar, backing vocals
- Sultan Raja - bass guitars
- Waqar Ahmed Khan - drums

Production

- Produced by Zulfiqar J. Khan
- Recorded & Mixed at Xth Harmonic Studio in Lahore, Pakistan
- Assisted by Zulfiqar J. Khan

== Chart performance ==
=== Singles ===
Year	Title	Chart positions				Album
Year	Title	IM Top 10	City FM 89	Channel V	Radio Mirchi	Album
2003	"Nishaan"	#1	-	-	-	Jilawatan
2003	"Pukaar"	#1	-	-	-	Jilawatan
2005	"Shayad"	#1	-	-	-	Jilawatan
2005	"Sab Bhula Kai"	#1	#1	#1	#1	Jilawatan
2006	"Bichar Kai Bhee"	#1	#1	-	-	Jilawatan
2007	"Kuch Naheen"	#1	-	-	-	Jilawatan

== Awards and nominations ==
The album has received nominations in several Pakistani award ceremonies. The following list contains all of them.

2nd Jazz IM Awards

- Best Debut - Pukaar
- Best Solo - Sub Bhula Kai

3rd Jazz IM Awards

- Best Ballad - Sab Bhula Kai
- Best Alternative Rock Song - Pukaar

Lux Style Awards

- Best Album - Jilawatan

The Musik Awards

- Best Ballad - Sab Bhula Kai
- Best Album - Jilawatan
- Best Lyrics - Zulfiqar 'Xulfi' J. Khan
- Best Music Producer - Zulfiqar 'Xulfi' J. Khan
