= Bradlaugh Hall =

Historic hall in Lahore, Punjab, Pakistan

- بریڈلا ہال
- Interactive map of the Bradlaugh Hall area
- Former names: National Congress Hall
- Alternative names: Bradlaugh Memorial Hall

General information
- Type: Public assembly hall
- Architectural style: Indo-Saracenic Revival
- Location: Rattigan Road, Lahore, Pakistan
- Coordinates: 31°34′37″N 74°18′33″E
- Named for: Charles Bradlaugh
- Groundbreaking: 1893
- Completed: 1900
- Client: Indian National Congress
- Owner: Walled City of Lahore Authority

Design and construction
- Designations: Federal Protected Site (PB-P-79)

Bradlaugh Hall (Urdu: بریڈلا ہال) is a historic hall located in Lahore, Punjab, Pakistan. It was founded in the memory of a British member of the parliament, Charles Bradlaugh. It hosted the meetings of the Congress during the Indian independence movement.

== History ==
Bradlaugh Hall was constructed in the late 19th century. The Indian National Congress, after five years of planning and fundraising, utilized this structure for its annual session in Lahore in 1893. This initiative was significantly assisted by Sardar Dyal Singh, a noted newspaper publisher who secured Lahore as the session venue in 1888. Surplus funds of Rs 10,000 from the session were allocated for the construction of Bradlaugh Hall.

The building was named in honor of Charles Bradlaugh, a British MP during the late Victorian era, recognized for his advocacy for social justice and affinity towards India. Bradlaugh attended the Indian National Congress's 5th annual session in India in 1889. In recognition of his contributions, a dedication plaque was installed at the hall by Surendra Nath Banerji, a senior leader of the Indian National Congress, on October 30, 1900.

Over the ensuing decades, the hall served as a venue for several advocates for the Indian subcontinent, particularly during the 1920s and 1930s. However, with the rise of the Muslim League in 1946, the Indian National Congress discontinued using the hall. Subsequently, the hall was repurposed as a grain storage facility, a residence for migrants from Amritsar, and a storage facility for ironworkers.

After a flood in 1956 rendered the hall unsuitable for habitation or storage, it was transferred to the National Technical Institute. Following the institute's closure in the late 1990s, the building was rented out to teachers of nearby government schools and other short-term tenants.

In 2024, the building was conserved and restored by the Walled City of Lahore Authority (WCLA), to preserve its legacy for future generations.
