= Koolmuzone =

Pakistani music website

- Website type: Music Blog
- Owner: Hamad Dar
- Creator: Hamad Dar
- Website: www.koolmuzone.pk
- Launched: 2004
- Current status: Active

Koolmuzone is one of the leading Pakistani music blogs started in 2004 by Hamad Dar.

The website has remained inactive since 2014 with no new updates on it.

== Content ==
Koolmuzone hosts music related news and allow newbie singers to get their music reviewed. After the site established its base, veteran singers also started uploading their music here. The other area this blog keep tabs on is the entertainment industry of Pakistan. It also reviews and updates about the underground music industry of Pakistan. It almost every day publishes music and videos from these underground musicians.

Koolmuzone first came to limelight when it revealed Coke Studio, a Pakistani Music show's second season's lineup before the official release. As of 2012 the site attracts 350,000 to 400,000 hits a month and currently ranks at 1,920 among Pakistani websites.

== Awards ==
Koolmuzone won the Pakistan Blog Award for best Music blog in 2010.
