= Ek Chalis Ki Last Local =

2007 Indian adventure comedy thriller

- Theatrical release poster
- Directed by: Sanjay Khanduri
- Produced by: Rajiv Shah; Guru Kher; Sandeep Singh
- Starring: Abhay Deol; Neha Dhupia; Ashwin Mushran; Nawazuddin Siddiqui; Vinay Apte; Ashok Samarth; Deepak Shirke; Virendra Saxena; Amit Mistry; Sunita Rajwar
- Cinematography: C Vijayasri
- Edited by: Dharmendra Sharma
- Music by: Call Band
- Production company: Quartet Films
- Distributed by: Shree Ashtavinayak Cine Vision
- Release date: 18 May 2007
- Running time: 150 minutes
- Country: India
- Language: Hindi

Ek Chalis Ki Last Local (English: Last Local of 1:40) is a 2007 Indian Bollywood adventure comedy thriller directed by Sanjay Khanduri, starring Abhay Deol and Neha Dhupia. The film was released on 18 May 2007.

== Plot ==
Nilesh, a call centre employee, misses his last local train at 1:40 am at Kurla Station. While looking for an autorickshaw, he bumps into a beautiful damsel in distress, Madhu, who also wants to get to Vikhroli. As it turns out, the autorickshaws are on strike due to a bomb blast earlier in the day at Ghatkopar. Nilesh and Madhu are forced to walk to the next rickshaw stand. Nilesh stops at a local pub and is unable to resist his temptation to have a drink or two alongside Madhu. He meets an old friend, Pat, who appears to have earned a lot of money within a year through gambling. Knowing his expertise with the cards, Pat invites Nilesh to join him in the inner chambers to play with the high rollers. Upon some persuasion from Madhu, he gives in and gambles. Taking over Nilesh's turn, Pat loses all the money they have won to Ponappa, an underworld don (who cheats). In the meantime, in his search for Madhu, Nilesh stumbles into the restroom, where he finds Madhu apparently being forced upon by a Nazeer, a drug addict. While Nazeer tries to attack Nilesh for interrupting, he slips and falls and dies.

As it turns out, Nazeer was the younger brother of Ponappa, who is devastated. Nazeer was also the lover of Madhu, who is revealed to be a prostitute whose real name is Mala. While Ponappa is about to kill Nilesh, inspector Malvankar (Ashok Samarth) with his havaldars burst in for a raid. Ponappa pays them to kill Nilesh and Madhu and use Pat as a witness. While on the way to Khandala for the encounter, Pat taunts inspector Malvankar, who shoots him dead. Nilesh and Madhu escape but are recaptured. Madhu offers the inspector more money to spare their lives, and they go to her madame Habiba in Dharavi to collect the money.

In parallel, Ponappa's men collect a ransom of 2.5 crore to return the kid of a rich man, but Rafique and Chakli (belonging to a rival gang) kill them and take the ransom.

Habiba takes everyone to the home of Mangesh Chilkey (a rival of Ponappa and whom Rafique and Chakli work for), who agrees to pay Inspector Malvankar and his men to spare Nilesh and Madhu's lives. In return, it is revealed that Habiba has sold Nilesh to Mangesh Chilkey, who plans to sodomise him. To save him, Madhu calls Ponappa and tells him that Mangesh Chilkey took his 2.5 crores. They eventually arrive, a shootout ensues, and everyone except Nilesh is killed. Nilesh takes off with the 2.5 crores and catches the first morning train at 4:10 AM.

A week later, Nilesh arrives in an expensive car and finds Madhu soliciting again at 1:40 outside Kurla station, and they leave together.

== Cast ==
- Abhay Deol as Nilesh Rastogi
- Neha Dhupia as Madhu/Mala
- Vinay Apte as Ponnappa
- Nawazuddin Siddiqui as Nazeer, Ponnappa's Brother (druggie in bar)
- Ashwin Mushran as Mr. Vinod Bajaj
- Snehal Dabi as Habiba
- Virendra Saxena as Rafique Mohammed
- Atul Srivastava as Hawaldar Tawde
- Manu Rishi as Jeetiya (mangesh's hatchman)
- Deepak Shirke as Mangesh Chilkey
- Ashok Samarth as Inspector Malvankar
- Amit Mistry as Patrick
- Kishor Kadam as Bhujang
- Sunita Rajwar as Chakli
- Sanatan Modi
- Bharat Ganeshpure as Policeman on Kurla station

== Soundtrack ==
The album of Ek Chalis Ki Last Local was composed by a Pakistani rock band Call and lyrics were penned by Gulzar.

- Laree Choote
- Laree Choote - Remix
- Ek Chauka
- Ek Chauka (Title version)
- Akh
- Akh (Dance version)
- Bheegi Bheegi Si
- Panga

== Reception ==
=== Critical reception ===
Taran Adarsh of Bollywood Hungama gave the film 3 stars out of 5, saying that "EK CHALIS KI LAST LOCAL is a decent fare that stands out for a few individualistic episodes in the narrative. At the box-office, the film caters to the multiplex audience mainly, especially big city multiplexes. Business in Mumbai multiplexes should be better due to its Mumbaiya flavor." Khalid Mohamed of Hindustan Times gave the film 3 stars out of 5, writing "Where were these guys hiding their extraordinary talent? Why haven’t they been seen in the big movies? Indeed, just for the zany Mistri-Samarth-Rajwar, and the mad mirthful spirit, it’s worth riding the Last Local." Shubhra Gupta of The Indian Express wrote "It's a little too long, losing steam in patches. Twenty minutes off, like with most debut movies, would have made it tight and terrific. It's also not for the squeamish, or those who are easily offended. It's for the rest. Go have yourselves some great chuckles."

Conversely, Tanveer Bookwala of Rediff.com gave the film 2 stars out of 5, writing "Abhay Deol has an interesting 'Mark Ruffalo' like innocence and childlike quality but looks completely lost in this enterprise. Neha Dhupia has become the industry's first choice to play a prostitute. Other than Laree Choote, the soundtrack is uninspiring. In what could have been a brilliant dark comedy ends up as a mishmash of everything weird. Bizarre!" India Today wrote, "Debutant director Sanjay Khanduri tries too hard to create a Quentin Tarantinoesque mix of black humour, blood, bodies and bullets. So anything is possible, including a scene in which a gay don tries to make Deol his boy toy. Deol has a wonderful unassuming charm but it isn't enough to make this derivative train ride engaging enough."
