= Sikhism by country =

Distribution of Sikhs

Percentage of Sikhs by country

Number of Sikhs by country

Most of the 25–30 million followers of Sikhism, the world's fifth-largest religion live in the northern Indian state of Punjab, the only Sikh-majority administrative division on Earth, but Sikh communities exist on every inhabited continent. Sizeable Sikh populations in countries across the world exist in India (20,833,116), Canada (~771,800), England (~520,100), the United States (~280,000), (Note: While the U.S. Census does not ask about religion, 70,697 Americans (or 0.02% of the total population) declared Sikh as their ethnicity in the 2020 census. In the 2021 Canadian census, 194,640 Canadians declared Sikh as their ethnicity while 771,790 Canadians declared Sikh as their religion, indicating that the Sikh American population may be around 280,329, or 0.08% of the total population. The U.S. Census Bureau estimated the adult Sikh American population at 78,000 in 2008. The Pew Research Center estimated the Sikh American adult population to be 140,000 and the total population at 200,000 in 2012 while the World Religion Database at Boston University estimated the American Sikh population to be at 280,000 in 2012. Sikh organizations like the Sikh Coalition and American Sikh Congressional Caucus estimate the Sikh American population to be as high as 1,000,000, but do not provide any sources for these figures; 500,000 nevertheless remains the most cited Sikh American population size in news media. With 1% of Asian Americans being Sikh, and 90.7% of Sikh Americans being Asian American, the American Sikh population can be estimated around 280,000 in 2021.) Italy (~220,000), and Australia (~210,400), while countries with the largest proportions of Sikhs include Canada (2.12%), India (1.72%), New Zealand (1.07%), Cyprus (~1.1%) England (0.92%), and Australia (0.83%).

Administrative divisions with significant proportions of Sikhs include Punjab, India (Sikhs account for 58% of the population), Chandigarh, India (13.1%), British Columbia, Canada (5.9%), Haryana, India (4.9%), Delhi, India (3.4%), West Midlands, England (2.9%), Manitoba, Canada (2.7%), Alberta, Canada (2.5%), Uttarakhand, India (2.3%), and Ontario, Canada (2.1%). Cities outside India with the largest Sikh populations are Brampton, Ontario, Canada (163,260); Surrey, British Columbia, Canada (154,415); and London, England (144,543).

At 93.33% Sikh, Tarn Taran is the world's most populated Sikh district or county. Located in the heart of the Majha region of Punjab founded by Guru Arjan Dev - the 5th Sikh guru, Tarn Taran also hosts the world's largest sarovar (sacred pool) even surpassing the great Darbar Sahib - Golden Temple in the neighbouring Amritsar district.

== By country ==
The figures on the table below are either based on each of the country's respective censuses or are calculated by specific organizations. Some of these figures are rounded off. In case of conflicting estimates, both the lowest and highest estimates are included.

Sikhs and Sikhism by country
Country	No. of Sikhs	Sikh %	% of all Sikhs	Year/Source(s)
Afghanistan *	140	0.00%	0.00%	2022
Argentina *	300 (Note: Families)	0.00%	0.00%	2012
Austria *	9,000	0.04%	0.04%	2020
Australia *	210,400	0.83%	0.90%	2021 Australian census
Bangladesh *	23,000	0.01%	0.10%	2020
Belgium *	10,000	0.09%	0.04%	2020
Brazil *	300	0.00%	0.00%	2018
Canada *	771,790	2.12%	3.29%	2021 Canadian census
Cyprus *	2,260	0.24%	0.01%	2021
Denmark *	4,000	0.07%	0.02%	2019
Fiji *	2,577	0.31%	0.01%	2007
France *	30,000	0.04%	0.13%	2017
(Georgia (country)) Georgia *	200	0.01%	0.00%	2018
Germany *	18,000	0.02%	0.08%	2017
Greece *	20,000	0.19%	0.09%	2015
Hong Kong *	12,000	0.16%	0.05%	2021
Iceland	100	0.03%	0.00%	2013
India *	20,833,116	1.72%	88.72%	2011 census of India
Indonesia *	15,000	0.01%	0.06%	2009
Iran *	100	0.00%	0.00%	2015
(Republic of Ireland) Ireland *	2,183	0.04%	0.01%	2022 census of Ireland
Italy *	220,000	0.37%	0.94%	2022
Kenya	6,000	0.01%	0.03%	2013
Kuwait	15,000	0.35%	0.06%	2021
Malaysia *	100,000	0.30%	0.43%	2016
Nepal *	609	0.00%	0.00%	2011 Nepal census
Netherlands *	15,000	0.08%	0.06%	2022
New Zealand *	53,406	1.07%	0.23%	2023 New Zealand census
Norway *	4,080	0.08%	0.02%	2020
Oman	33,704	0.75%	0.14%	2020
Pakistan *	15,998	0.01%	0.07%	2023 Pakistani census
Panama *	302	0.01%	0.00%	2020
Philippines	28,436	0.03%	0.12%	2020
Portugal *	35,000	0.34%	0.15%	2020
Saudi Arabia	6,700	0.02%	0.03%	2021
Singapore *	12,051	0.35%	0.05%	2020
South Africa *	13,000	0.02%	0.06%	2020
Spain *	26,000	0.05%	0.11%	2020
Sweden *	4,000	0.04%	0.02%	2020
Thailand *	70,000	0.10%	0.30%	2005
Trinidad and Tobago *	150	0.01%	0.00%	2022
Uganda	2,400	0.01%	0.01%	2021
United Arab Emirates *	52,000	0.56%	0.22%	2022
United Kingdom *	524,529	0.85%	2.23%	2021 United Kingdom census
United States *	280,000	0.08%	1.19%	2021 (Note: While the U.S. Census does not ask about religion, 70,697 Americans (or 0.02% of the total population) declared Sikh as their ethnicity in the 2020 census. In the 2021 Canadian census, 194,640 Canadians declared Sikh as their ethnicity while 771,790 Canadians declared Sikh as their religion, indicating that the Sikh American population may be around 280,329, or 0.08% of the total population. The U.S. Census Bureau estimated the adult Sikh American population at 78,000 in 2008. The Pew Research Center estimated the Sikh American adult population to be 140,000 and the total population at 200,000 in 2012 while the World Religion Database at Boston University estimated the American Sikh population to be at 280,000 in 2012. Sikh organizations like the Sikh Coalition and American Sikh Congressional Caucus estimate the Sikh American population to be as high as 1,000,000, but do not provide any sources for these figures; 500,000 nevertheless remains the most cited Sikh American population size in news media. With 1% of Asian Americans being Sikh, and 90.7% of Sikh Americans being Asian American, the American Sikh population can be estimated around 280,000 in 2021.)
Total	23,482,831 (Note: Total of countries listed above. List last totaled 24 December 2025.)	0.29%	100.10%	

== Census Data ==
As a religious minority, Sikhs have fought long and hard to get official status and to be counted in many countries across the world. Through the efforts of Sikh organisations and communities in their respective countries, there is now readily available population data on Sikhs as part of the census in the following territories:

Census Data
Country	Sikh Religion				Sikh Ethnicity			
Country	Rank	Pop.	%	Year	Pop.	%	Year	Response
India	4th	20,833,116	1.72%	2011				
Canada	4th	771,790	2.12%	2021	194,640	0.54%	2021	Multiple
England	4th	520,092	0.92%	2021	98,666	0.17%	2021	Single
United States					48,321	0.01%	2020	Single
United States					70,697	0.02%	2020	Multiple
Australia	5th	210,400	0.83%	2021	60,501	0.24%	2021	Multiple
New Zealand	5th	53,406	1.07%	2023	7,611	0.15%	2018	Single
New Zealand	5th	53,406	1.07%	2023	9,111	0.18%	2018	Multiple
Pakistan	4th	15,998	0.01%	2023				
Singapore	6th	12,051	0.35%	2020				
Thailand	6th	11,124	0.02%	2010				
Scotland	5th	10,988	0.2%	2022	873	0.02%	2011	Multiple
Wales	5th	4,048	0.13%	2021	683	0.02%	2021	Single
Austria	6th	2,794	0.03%	2001				
Fiji	4th	2,577	0.31%	2007				
Cyprus	4th	2,260	0.24%	2021				
(Republic of Ireland) Ireland	6th	2,183	0.04%	2022				
Nepal	7th	1,496	0.01%	2021				
Northern Ireland	6th	389	0.02%	2021	43	0.00%	2021	Single
Mauritius		182 (Note: Combined responses of "Sikh" (116) and "Punjabi" (66).)	0.01%	2022				
Czech Republic		86	0.00%	2021				
Poland		83 (Note: Combined responses of "Sikhizm" (6) and "Związek Wyznaniowy Singh Sabha Gurudwarai" (77).)	0.00%	2021				
Faroe Islands	7th	3	0.01%	2011				

Official statistics do not count unregistered arrivals or those who have not completed the census or surveys. However, they do provide for a much more accurate depiction of Sikh communities as opposed to estimates from various Sikh organisations whose estimates can vary vastly with no statistically valuable source. Thus, official statistics and census data is highly important and Sikh communities continue to push for census inclusion in many countries where they are still not counted.

Country	Born in Country		Born Overseas		Data
Country	Total	%	Total	%	Data
England	296,673	57.0%	223,419	43.0%	2021
Canada	236,400	30.6%	535,390	69.4%	2021
Australia	51,939	24.9%	157,940	75.1%	2021
Singapore	8,369	69.5%	3,682	30.5%	2020
Wales	2,431	60.1%	1,617	39.9%	2021
Cyprus	56	2.5%	2,204	97.5%	2021

Canada has the largest Sikh population outside India, this is largely due to those born overseas outside Canada numbering 500,000+. Whilst England ranks number 1 for having the largest number born in the diaspora.

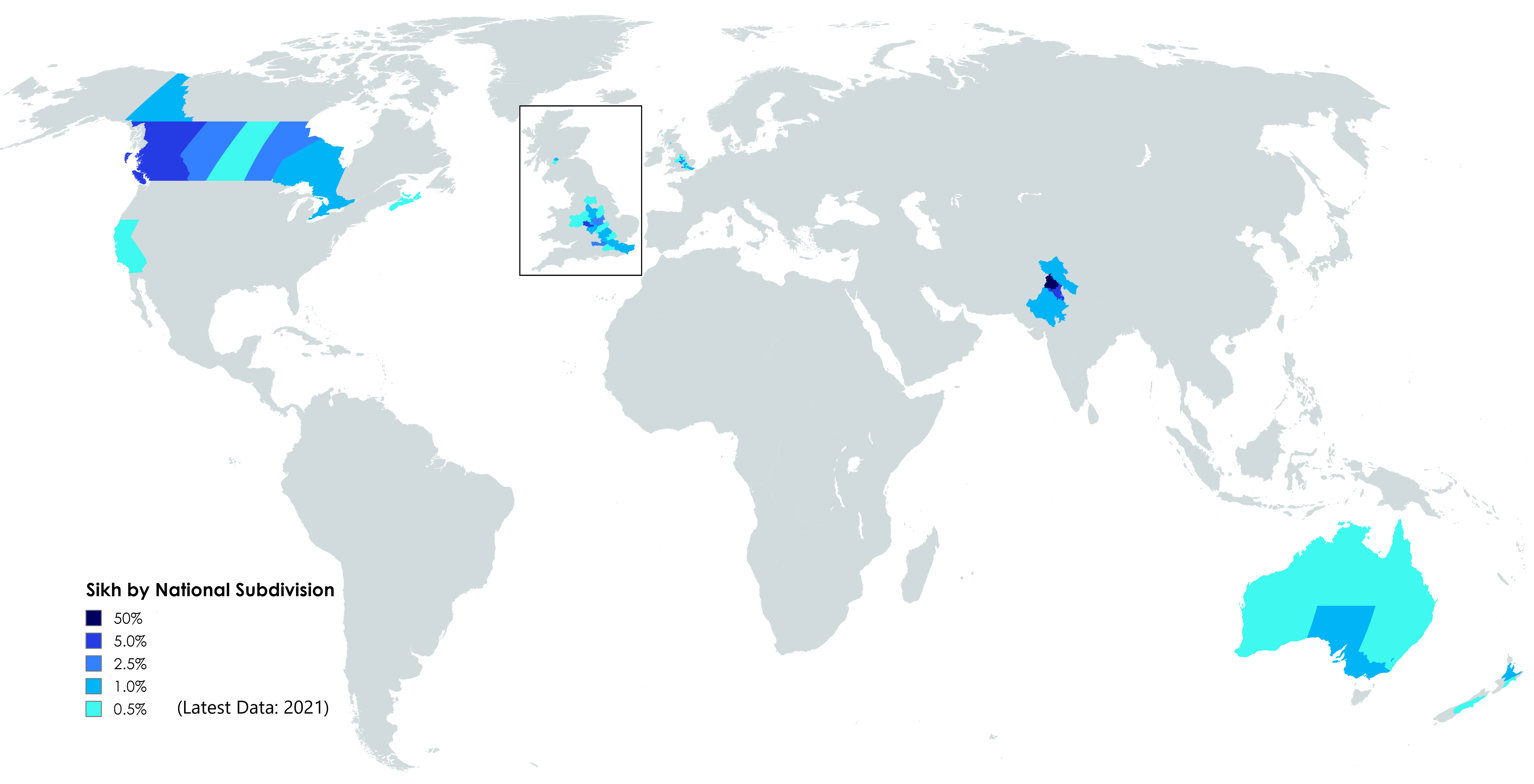
% Sikh by National Subdivision

=== Formerly on census ===
Afghanistan had Sikhism as an option on its only census ever held in 1979, the Afghan conflict prevented.ref>"Population Census 1979 Afghanistan, 1979".</ref>

Austria measured Sikhism on the 2000 census but not the 2020 census.

Fiji recorded Sikh population in 1966 census (3,002 or 0.63%), 1996 census (3,076 or 0.4%), and 2007 census (2,577 or 0.31%), but not on most recent 2017 census.

Malaysia recorded Sikh population.

Palestine recorded Sikhs in 1922.

== Largest proportions and populations ==
Rank	Proportion		Population	
Rank	Country	Proportion	Country	Population
1	Canada	2.12%	India	23,786,000 (Note: (Note: Sikhs comprise 1.7% (23,786,052) of India's total population of 1,399,179,585 per 2023 estimate by the World Factbook.))
2	India	1.72% (Note: The Indian Sikh population grew from 16,420,685 to 19,237,391 between 1991 and 2001, a rise of 2,816,706 or 17.15%. It further rose from 19,237,391 to 20,833,116 between 1991 and 2001, a rise of 1,595,725 or 8.29%. Assuming the Indian Sikh population growth rate continues to decline at the same rate, which is likely since Sikhs have the lowest birth rate across all Indian religious groups, the Indian Sikh population would grow by 4.01% between 2011 and 2021, or from 20,833,116 to 21,668,524.)	Canada	771,790
3	New Zealand	1.07%	United Kingdom	524,000
4	Australia	0.83%	United States	280,000 (Note: While the U.S. Census does not ask about religion, 70,697 Americans (or 0.02% of the total population) declared Sikh as their ethnicity in the 2020 census. In the 2021 Canadian census, 194,640 Canadians declared Sikh as their ethnicity while 771,790 Canadians declared Sikh as their religion, indicating that the Sikh American population may be around 280,329, or 0.08% of the total population. The U.S. Census Bureau estimated the adult Sikh American population at 78,000 in 2008. The Pew Research Center estimated the Sikh American adult population to be 140,000 and the total population at 200,000 in 2012 while the World Religion Database at Boston University estimated the American Sikh population to be at 280,000 in 2012. Sikh organizations like the Sikh Coalition and American Sikh Congressional Caucus estimate the Sikh American population to be as high as 1,000,000, but do not provide any sources for these figures; 500,000 nevertheless remains the most cited Sikh American population size in news media. With 1% of Asian Americans being Sikh, and 90.7% of Sikh Americans being Asian American, the American Sikh population can be estimated around 280,000 in 2021.)
5	United Kingdom	0.80%	Australia	210,400
6	Oman	0.75%	Italy	210,000
7	United Arab Emirates	0.56%	Malaysia	100,000
8	Italy	0.37%	Thailand	70,000
9	Singapore	0.35%	New Zealand	53,406
10	Cyprus	0.24%	United Arab Emirates	52,000
11			Philippines	50,000
12			Oman	35,540
13			Portugal	35,000
14			France	30,000
15			Spain	26,000
16			Germany	25,000
17			Bangladesh	23,000
18			Greece	20,000
19			Pakistan	15,998
20			Netherlands	15,000
21			Kuwait	15,000
22			Hong Kong	15,000
23			Singapore	12,051
24			Indonesia	10,000
25			Belgium	10,000

== Historical Data ==
The Afghan Sikh population declined from between 200,000 and 500,000 (1.8% to 4.6% of the Afghan population) in the 1970s to 45 in 2022 following decades of conflict.

Sikhism by country (2001−2021)
Country	2021		2011		2001		Change (2011-2021)		Change (2001-2011)		Source
Country	Pop.	%	Pop.	%	Pop.	%	±	+%	±	+%	Source
India			20,833,116	1.72%	19,237,391	1.87%			1,595,725	8.29%	
Canada	771,790	2.12%	454,965	1.38%	278,410	0.94%	316,825	69.64%	176,555	63.42%	
England	520,092	0.92%	420,196	0.79%	327,343	0.63%	99,896	23.77%	92,853	28.37%	
United States	269,986	0.08%	189,242	0.06%	119,740	0.04%	80,744	42.67%	69,502	58.04%	(Note: The United States Census does not ask about religious affiliation. Sikh organizations estimate the Sikh American population to be as high as 750,000. Before the United Kingdom Census started asking about religion in 2001, Sikh organizations estimated the British Sikh population to be as high as 750,000, but the 2001 census found the British Sikh population to be only 336,149. Thus, population figures by Sikh organizations are likely overestimates. A comprehensive 2012 survey by the Pew Research Center estimated that 1% of Asian Americans and 5% of Indian Americans are Sikhs, which would yield a Sikh population of approximately 200,000 in 2012 and 290,000 in 2021. The most comprehensive way to estimate the Sikh American population is by comparing to the Punjabi American population. Out of the 4,060,554 Americans who spoke a South Asian language at home in 2021, 318,588, or 7.85%, spoke Punjabi at home. This indicates that Punjabi Americans make up 7.85% of the South Asian American population of 5,492,692, and thus number 430,952. This matches with a comprehensive 2020 survey of Indian Americans by the Carnegie Endowment for International Peace, which found that 8% of Indian Americans were Punjabi. Using this same method, the populations of Punjabi Canadians, English Punjabis, and Punjabi Australians can be estimated at 1,146,900, 931,671, and 319,377 respectively, using language data from censuses conducted in 2021 in those nations. Those nations also ask about religion in their censuses, with there being 771,790 Sikh Canadians, 520,092 English Sikhs, and 210,400 Sikh Australians in 2021. Thus, the Sikh population was about 62.65% of the Punjabi population in those three countries combined. Using this ratio, the American Sikh population can be estimated at 269,986 in 2021. This ratio can also be used to estimate Sikh populations of American states, counties, and communities using population data of Punjabi speakers.)
Australia	210,400	0.83%	72,296	0.34%	17,437	0.09%	138,101	191.02%	54,859	314.61%	
New Zealand	(Note: 2023 census)40,908	1.07%	(Note: 2013 census)19,191	0.45%	5,199	0.14%	34,215	178.29%	13,992	269.13%	
Norway	4,208	0.08%	2,975	0.06%							
Wales	4,048	0.13%	2,962	0.10%	2,015	0.07%	1,086		947		
Nepal	1,496	0.01%	609	0.00%			887				
Fiji	500	0.10%	(Note: 2007 census)2,540	0.30%	(Note: 1996 census)3,067	0.40%			-527	−17.18%	
Northern Ireland	389	0.02%	216	0.01%	219	0.01%	173		-3		

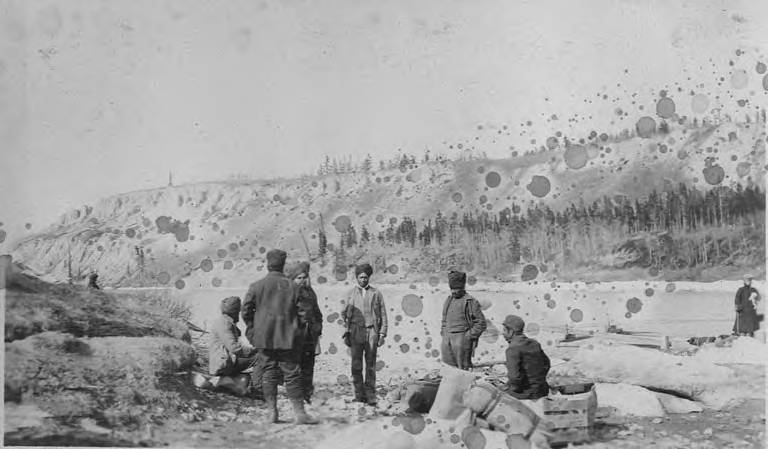
Depiction of early Sikh immigration to Canada (Whitehorse, Yukon). Circa 1906.

== Other data ==
=== Administrative divisions ===
The following table will only list administrative divisions with 1,000 Sikhs or higher.

Sikhs by administrative division (2021) (Note: 2011 census data for India, 2011 census data for Scotland, 2018 census data for New Zealand, 2020 census data for United States, and 2022 census data for Bihar.)
Administrative division	Pop.	%
Punjab, India	16,004,754	57.69%
(India) Haryana	1,243,752	4.91%
(India) Rajasthan	872,930	1.27%
(India) Uttar Pradesh	643,500	0.32%
(India) Delhi	570,581	3.40%
(Canada) Ontario	300,435	2.14%
(Canada) British Columbia	290,870	5.92%
(India) Uttarakhand	236,340	2.34%
(India) Jammu and Kashmir	232,585	1.90%
(India) Maharashtra	223,247	0.20%
(United Kingdom) (England) West Midlands	172,398	2.90%
(India) Madhya Pradesh	151,412	0.21%
(United States) California	146,614	0.37%
(United Kingdom) (England) London	144,543	1.64%
(India) Chandigarh	138,329	13.11%
(Canada) Alberta	103,600	2.48%
(Australia) (Victoria (state)) Victoria	91,745	1.41%
(India) Himachal Pradesh	79,896	1.16%
(United Kingdom) (England) South East	74,348	0.80%
(India) Jharkhand	71,422	0.22%
(India) Chhattisgarh	70,036	0.27%
(India) West Bengal	63,523	0.07%
(India) Gujarat	58,246	0.10%
(United Kingdom) (England) East Midlands	53,950	1.11%
(Australia) New South Wales	47,165	0.58%
(Canada) Manitoba	35,470	2.71%
(United States) (New York (state)) New York	31,496	0.16%
(India) Telangana	30,340	0.09%
(India) Karnataka	28,773	0.05%
(Australia) Queensland	27,713	0.54%
(United Kingdom) (England) East	24,284	0.38%
(United Kingdom) (England) Yorkshire and the Humber	24,034	0.44%
(New Zealand) Auckland	23,832	1.52%
(Canada) Quebec	23,345	0.28%
(India) Odisha	21,991	0.05%
(India) Assam	20,672	0.07%
Western Australia	18,583	0.70%
(United States) (Washington (state)) Washington	17,316	0.22%
South Australia	17,259	0.97%
(United States) New Jersey	15,417	0.17%
(India) Bihar	14,753	0.01%
(India) Tamil Nadu	14,601	0.02%
(United Kingdom) (England) North West	11,862	0.16%
(United States) Texas	10,777	0.04%
(India) Andhra Pradesh	9,904	0.02%
(United Kingdom) Scotland	9,055	0.17%
(Canada) Saskatchewan	9,035	0.82%
(United Kingdom) (England) South West	7,465	0.13%
(United Kingdom) (England) North East	7,206	0.27%
(United States) Indiana	6,812	0.10%
(United States) Virginia	6,792	0.08%
(United States) Michigan	5,809	0.06%
Punjab, Pakistan	5,649	0.00%
(Pakistan) Sindh	5,182	0.01%
(United States) Illinois	5,087	0.04%
(New Zealand) Bay of Plenty	4,842	1.57%
(Canada) Nova Scotia	4,730	0.49%
(United States) Pennsylvania	4,354	0.03%
(Australia) Australian Capital Territory	4,323	0.95%
(New Zealand) Waikato	4,074	0.89%
(Pakistan) Khyber Pakhtunkhwa	4,050	0.01%
(United Kingdom) Wales	4,048	0.13%
(United States) Maryland	4,013	0.06%
(India) Kerala	3,814	0.01%
(United States) Ohio	3,517	0.03%
(India) Arunachal Pradesh	3,287	0.24%
(India) Meghalaya	3,045	0.10%
(New Zealand) Canterbury	2,973	0.50%
(United States) Massachusetts	2,379	0.03%
(United States) Florida	2,359	0.01%
(India) Ladakh	2,263	0.83%
(Australia) Tasmania	2,208	0.40%
(United States) Arizona	2,177	0.03%
(United States) (Georgia (U.S. state)) Georgia	2,173	0.02%
(India) Nagaland	1,890	0.10%
(India) Sikkim	1,868	0.31%
(Canada) New Brunswick	1,780	0.23%
(New Zealand) Wellington	1,647	0.32%
(India) Manipur	1,527	0.05%
(India) Goa	1,473	0.10%
(United States) North Carolina	1,431	0.01%
(United States) Connecticut	1,424	0.04%
(United States) Wisconsin	1,412	0.02%
(Australia) Northern Territory	1,401	0.60%
(New Zealand) Hawke's Bay	1,347	0.81%
(United States) Colorado	1,324	0.02%
(India) Andaman and Nicobar Islands	1,286	0.34%
(Canada) Prince Edward Island	1,165	0.77%
(United States) Oregon	1,130	0.03%
(United States) Nevada	1,118	0.04%
(India) Tripura	1,070	0.03%
(Pakistan) (Balochistan, Pakistan) Balochistan	1,057	0.01%

=== Sub-districts ===
Faith in Newton, Surrey (2021) World's only Sikh majority neighbourhood outside India
1. Christian (16.4%)
2. No Religion (13.9%)
3. Sikh (51.5%)
4. Muslim (8.70%)
5. Hindu (8.10%)
6. Buddhist (0.90%)
7. Jewish (0.10%)
8. Other faiths (0.40%)

A sub-district is a local administrative division known as different names in respective countries: called tehsils in India, electoral districts in Canada and wards in England. These are smaller than counties or districts and consist of neighbourhoods and suburbs. Newton, Surrey is the only Sikh majority sub-district outside India with Sikhs representing 51.5% of the population in 2021. There are however, a number of other neighbourhoods outside India where Sikhs form the largest group (plurality).

Neighbourhoods with Sikhs as Largest Group
Sub-district (neighbourhood)	Division	Nation	% Sikh
Newton - Surrey	British Columbia	Canada	51.5%
Blakenhall - Wolverhampton	West Midlands	England	40.7%
Brampton East - Peel	Ontario	Canada	40.4%
Southall Green - Ealing	London	England	36.8%
Heston West - Hounslow	London	England	31.8%
Lady Margaret - Ealing	London	England	28.2%
Pinkwell - Hillingdon	London	England	26.5%
Norwood Green - Ealing	London	England	26.2%

=== Municipalities ===
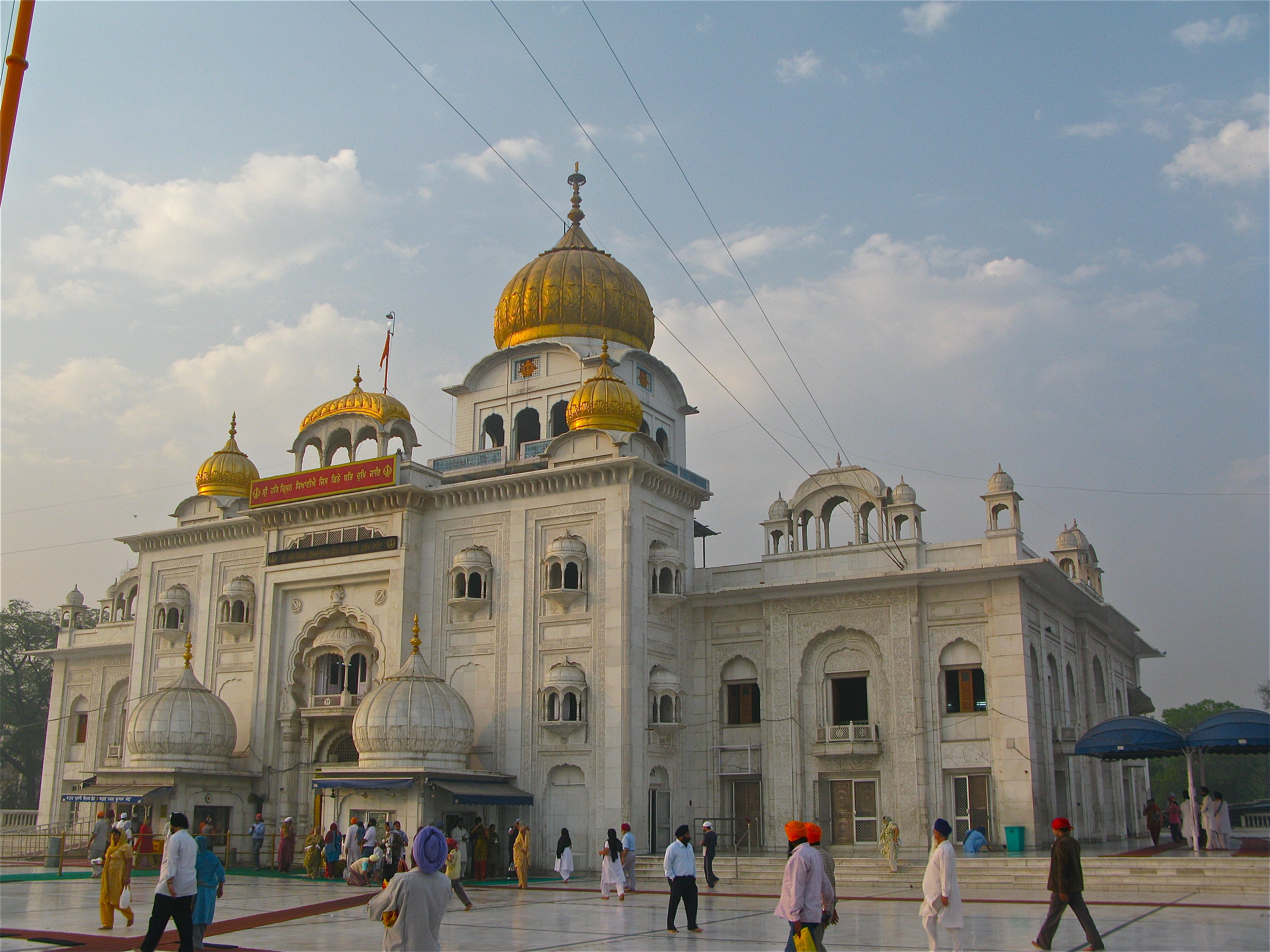
Gurudwara Bangla Sahib is located in Delhi. India's capital and second-largest city with nearly 20 million inhabitants, Delhi was home to 570,581 Sikhs at the 2011 census, the largest municipal Sikh population in the world.

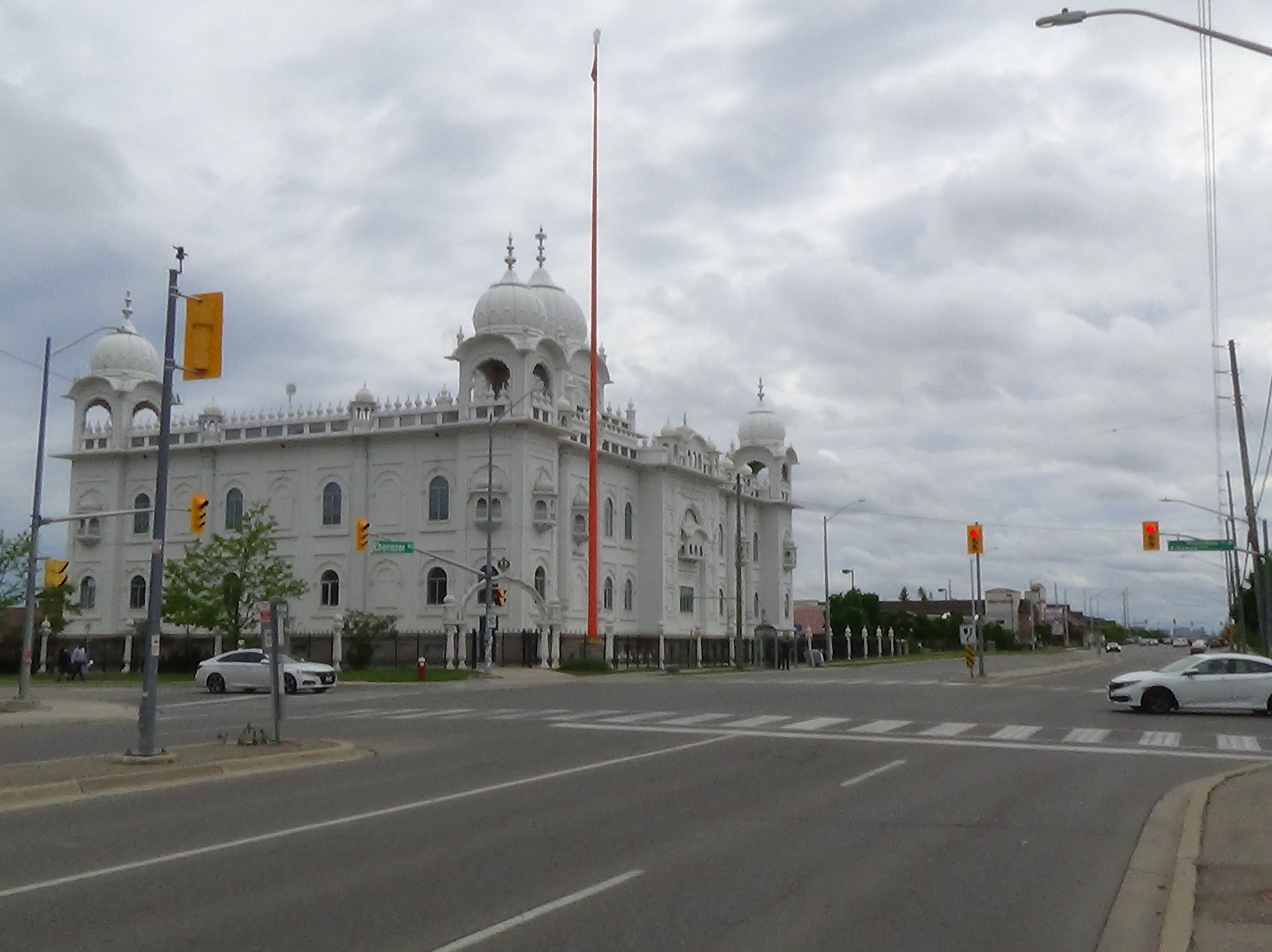
Gurdwara Dasmesh Darbar is located in Brampton, Ontario. Home to 163,260 Sikhs at the 2021 census, Brampton has the world's largest municipal Sikh population outside India.

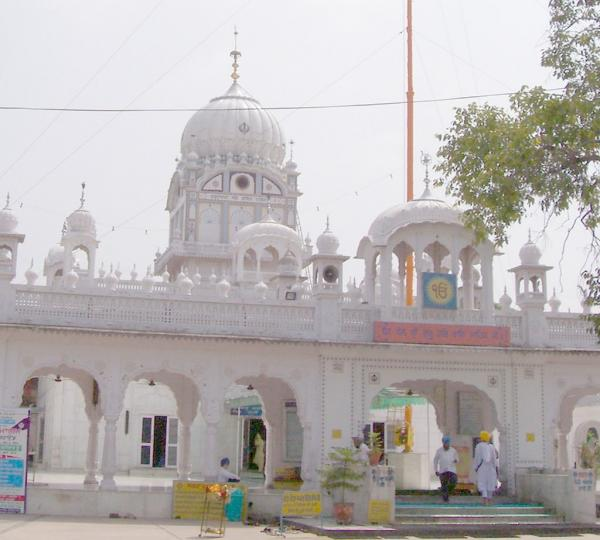
Gurdwara Amb Sahib is located in Mohali, Punjab, the largest Sikh-majority city on Earth with a total population of 166,864 at the 2011 census.

20 largest municipal Sikh populations
Municipality	Sikh population	Total population	Sikh proportion %	Largest religious group	Source				
Municipality	Sikh population	Total population	Sikh proportion %	Largest religious group	(India) Delhi	570,581	16,787,941	3.40%	Hindu (81.68%)
(India) Amritsar	556,431	1,159,227	48.00%	Hindu (49.36%)					
(India) Ludhiana	465,393	1,618,879	28.75%	Hindu (65.96%)					
(India) Jalandhar	185,869	868,929	21.39%	Hindu (74.90%)					
(India) Patiala	178,336	446,246	39.96%	Hindu (57.22%)					
(Canada) Brampton	163,260	650,165	25.11%	Christian (35.72%)					
(Canada) Surrey	154,415	562,565	27.45%	Christian (30.24%)					
(United Kingdom) London	144,543	8,799,728	1.64%	Christian (40.66%)					
(India) Chandigarh	138,329	1,055,450	13.11%	Hindu (80.78%)					
(India) Bhatinda	100,139	446,246	35.04%	Hindu (62.61%)					
(India) Mohali	85,983	166,864	51.53%	Sikh (51.53%)					
(Australia) Melbourne	85,286	4,917,750	1.73%	Christian (40.14%)					
(India) Moga	82,456	163,397	50.46%	Sikh (50.46%)					
(India) Mumbai	60,759	12,442,373	0.49%	Hindu (65.99%)					
(India) Batala	59,996	156,619	37.82%	Hindu (56.00%)					
(India) Barnala	58,652	116,449	50.37%	Sikh (50.37%)					
(India) Khanna	52,240	128,137	40.77%	Hindu (56.41%)					
(India) Tarn Taran	50,583	66,847	75.67%	Sikh (75.67%)					
(India) Muktsar	49,934	116,747	42.77%	Hindu (55.56%)					
(Canada) Calgary	49,465	1,306,784	3.83%	Christian (44.53%)					

== See also ==
- Sikh diaspora
- Punjabis
- List of religious populations
