= Sikhism in Spain =

Sikhism in Spain Sijs en España

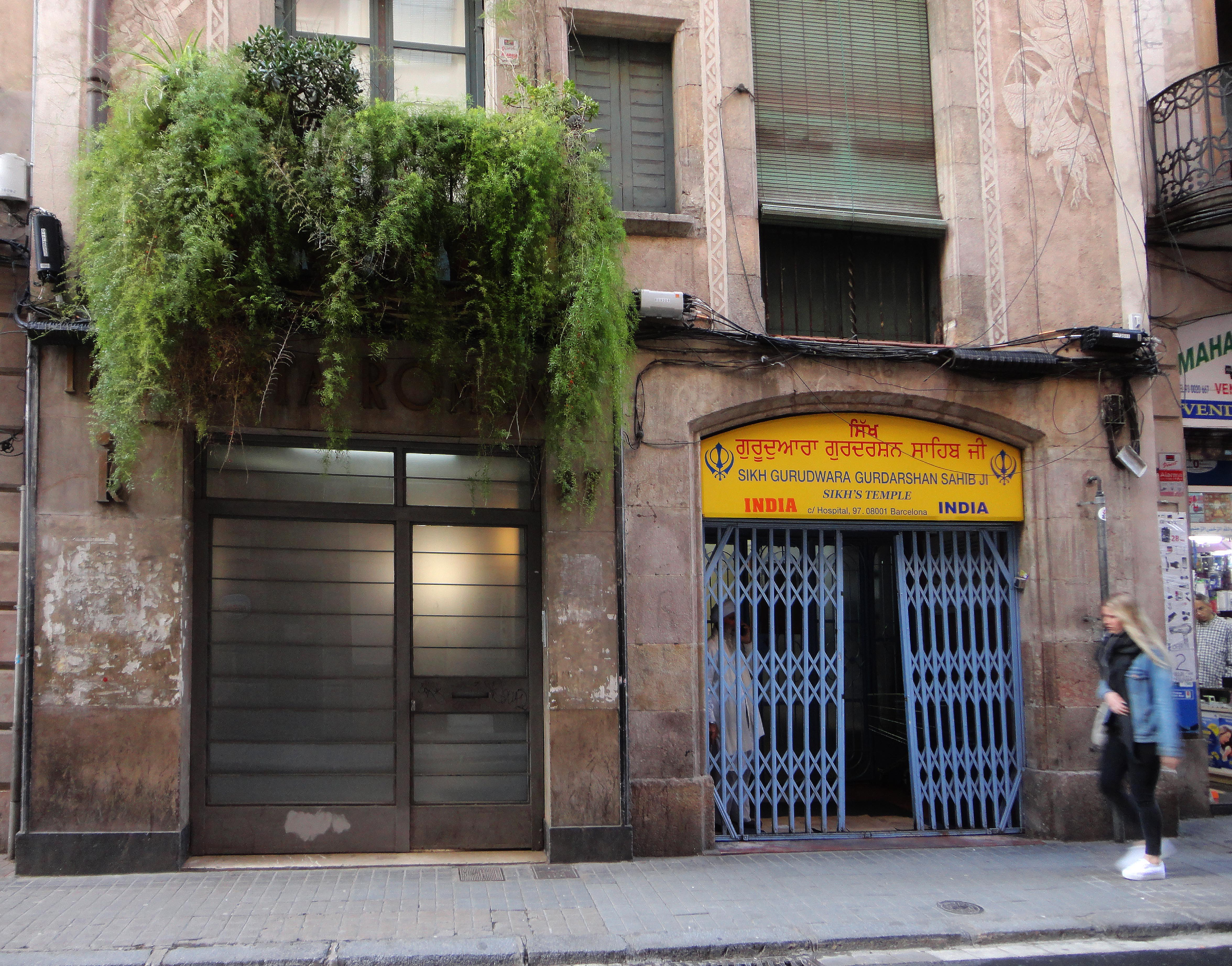
- Gurdwara Guru Darshan Sahib in Barcelona, Spain

Total population
- 26,000

Regions with significant populations
- Barcelona · Madrid · Valencia

Religions
- Sikhism

Languages
- Punjabi · Spanish • Catalan • Valencian • Basque • Hindi • Urdu

Sikhs in Spain are a minority religion group. The Sikh community in Spain is a small but fast growing group. According to the latest available data, there are estimated to be around 26,000 Sikhs living in the country.

The Sikh population in Spain has grown over the years, with many Sikhs migrating to the country for agricultural work, construction work or to start their own businesses.

Sikhism in Spain dates back to the 1980s, where many Sikhs migrated as a result of relaxed immigration policies and labour shortages.

== History ==
=== 1990's to present ===
After Spain joined the European Union in 1986, it became attractive for a large number of Punjabi immigrants. The Sikh migration began in the early 1990s when Spain was undergoing a construction boom and was in a labour shortage.

Since the 1990s, Sikhs from Punjab, India began to work in the agricultural, tourism and manufacturing sector. Many Sikhs also have opened up Indian restaurants around Spain.

Most Sikhs can be found in Barcelona, Valencia, Madrid, Alicante and Bilbao.

In 2017, the Catalonia Sikh Community gave assistance during the 2017 Barcelona attacks.

== Discrimination ==
- In 2023, a Sikh boy was asked to remove his turban during a football match in Spain. According to a FIFA ruling, men football players can wear turbans during matches.

== Gurdwara ==
There are 12 Gurdwaras in Spain.

- Gurdwara Guru Darshan Sahib in Barcelona
- Gurdwara Nanaksar in Barcelona
- Gurdwara Shaheed Baba Deep Singh in Alicante
- Gurdwara Bhai Mardana Ji in Olot
- Gurdwara Sikh Sangat in Málaga
- Gurdwara Sikh Sangat in Valencia
- Gurdwara Guru Nanak Association in Valencia
- Gurdwara Guru Laadho Re Santa Coloma in Santa Coloma de Gramenet
- Gurdwara Valencia in Valencia
- Gurdwara Sikh Kalgidhar Sahib De Salt
- Gurdwara Sri Guru Nanak Dev Ji in Lloret de Mar
- Gurdwara Nanaksar in Madrid

== See also ==
- Religion in Spain
- Sikhism by country
- Sikhism in Portugal
- Indians in Spain
- Sikhism in Greece
- Sikhism in Italy
- Sikhism in France
