= Sikhism in Germany =

Sikhism in Germany Sikhismus in Deutschland

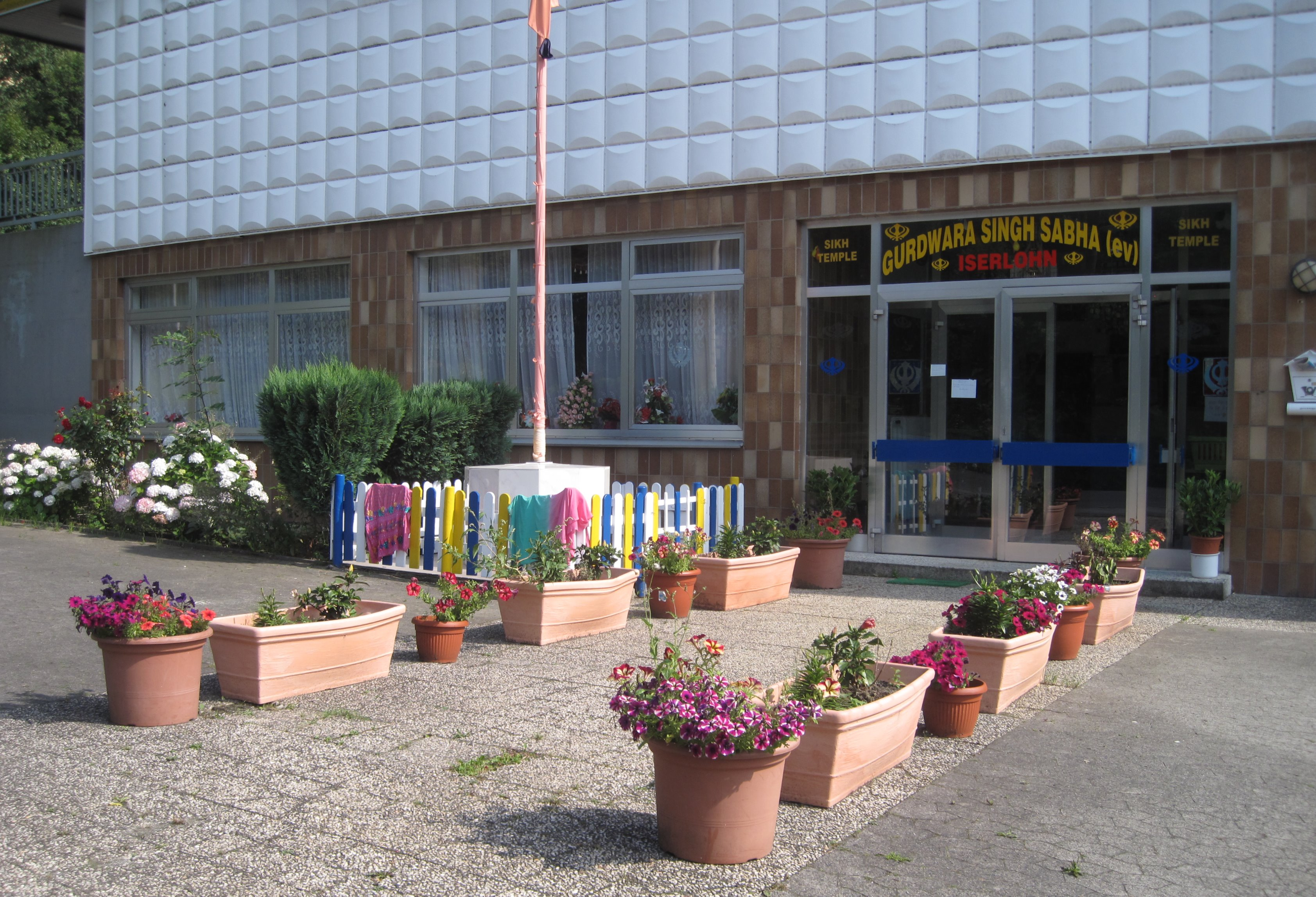
- Gurdwara Singh Sabha in Iserlohn, NRW, Germany

Total population
- 25,000 estimate

Regions with significant populations
- Berlin · Frankfurt · Munich · Hamburg · Cologne ·

Religions
- Sikhism

Languages
- Punjabi · Hindi · German

German Sikhs are a growing religious minority in Germany. The majority of German Sikhs have their roots from the Punjab, India with the remaining coming from the Afghan Sikh community or through conversion. The number of Sikhs is estimated to be between 25,000. Germany has the sixth highest Sikh population in Europe after United Kingdom (535,000), Italy (220,000), Portugal (35,000), France (30,000) and Spain (26,000).

The majority of Sikhs can be found in Berlin, Cologne, Hamburg, Frankfurt or Munich.

== Gurdwaras ==
Here are a list of some of the Gurdwaras in Germany.

- Gurdwara Sri Guru Nanak Sabha, Munich
- Gurdwara Singh Sabha, Augsburg
- Gurdwara Singh Sabha, Berlin
- Gurudwara Singh Sabha, Aachen
- Gurudwara Darbar Sri Guru Granth Sahib Ji, Bochum
- Gurdwara Shri Guru Darshan Sahib, Bremen
- Gurudwara Singh Sabha Chemnitz, Chemnitz
- Sikh Temple Chemnitz
- Gurudwara Gurujot Sahib Delmenhorst, Delmenhorst
- Gurujot Sikh Temple, Delmenhorst
- Gurudwara Sri Guru Nanak Darbar, Dresden
- Gurdwara Singh Sabha Duisburg, Moers
- Gurudwara Shri Guru Ram Das Sahib, Duisburg
- Gurudwara Sarbat Da Bhala, Erfurt
- Gurdwara Nanaksar, Essen
- Gurudwara Dashmesh Darbar, Essen
- Gurdwara Singh Sabha, Frankfurt
- Gurudwara Guru Nanak Niwas, Frankfurt
- Gurudwara Sri Nanaksar, Goslar
- Gurdwara Singh Sabha, Hamburg
- Singh Sabha Sikh Center, Hamburg
- Gurdwara Sri Guru Nanak Darbar, Hamburg
- Gurdwara Sri Guru Nanak Darbar, Hannover
- Gurudwara Shri Guru Ram Dass Ji, Hannover
- Gurdwara Singh Sabha, Iserlohn
- Gurudwara Sikh Gemeinde Südbaden, Lahr
- Gurdwara Shri Dashmesh Singh Sabha, Cologne
- Gurdwara Guru Nanak Parkash, Cologne
- Gurdwara Shri Guru Teg Bahadar Sahib, Cologne
- Gurdwara Guru Shabad Parkash, Cologne
- Gurdwara Gurmat Parchar, Leipzig
- Gurdwara Shri Singh Sabha, Mannheim
- Gurudwara Sri Guru Nanak Darbar, Neunkirchen, Saarland
- Gurdwara Guru Nanak Mission, Nuremberg
- Gurudwara Dhan Baba Deep Singh Ji, Nuremberg
- Gurudwara Sri Guru Singh Sabha, Paderborn
- Gurudwara Sri Guru Nanak Darbar, Regensburg
- Gurudwara Singh Sabha, Regensburg
- Gurdwara Guru Nanak Dev Ji, Soest, Germany
- Guru Nanak Niwas Gurdwara, Stuttgart
- Gurudwara Satsang Darbar, Stuttgart
- Gurudwara Baba Deep Singh Ji, Straelen
- Gurdwara Sahib, Tübingen
- Gurdwara Nanak Darbar, Offenbach am Main
- Gurudwara Gurmat Parchar, Leinfelden-Echterdingen
- Gurudwara Singh Sabha, Ulm
- Gurudwara Gobind Sager, Wurzburg

== List of German Sikhs ==
- Harmanjot Singh - Cricketer for Germany National Team

== Attack on Sikh Community ==
In April 2016, two 16-year-old Muslims bombed a gurdwara in the German city of Essen using fire extinguishers that were converted into an explosive device. The devices detonated after a wedding party had left for the reception. A gurdwara priest was injured seriously, while two others were treated for minor injuries. The building itself was damaged severely. One of the teens was in deradicalization program. The two denied that it was religiously motivated, saying it was “just for the kick of building fireworks!” However, before setting off the blast, the two tried to break into another gurdwara in North Rhine Westphalia.
