= Sikhism in Australia =

Religion in Australia

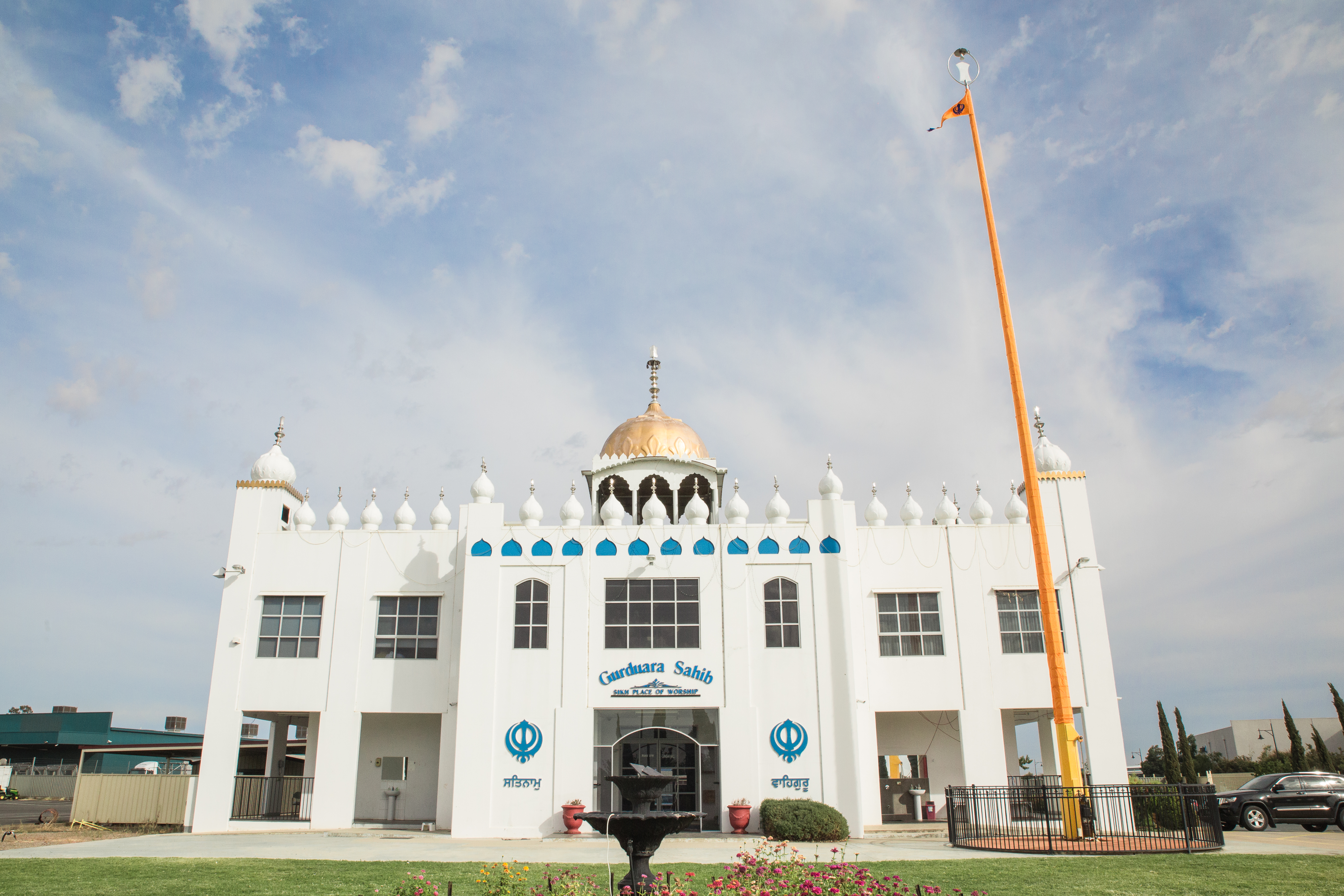
- A gurdwara in Shepparton, Victoria.

Total population
- 210,400; 0.83% of the total Australian population (2021)

Regions with significant populations
- Victoria: 91,745 (1.41%)
- New South Wales: 47,165 (0.58%)
- Queensland: 27,713 (0.54%)
- Western Australia: 18,583 (0.70%)
- South Australia: 17,259 (0.97%)

Languages
- Australian English • Punjabi; Hindi • Urdu

Related ethnic groups
- Indian Australians; Punjabi Australians; American Sikhs; British Sikhs; Canadian Sikhs New Zealander Sikhs

Australian Sikhs number over 210,000 people and account for 0.8% of Australia's population as of 2021, forming the country's fastest-growing and fifth-largest religious group. The largest Sikh populations in Australia are found in Victoria, followed by New South Wales and Queensland.

== History ==
=== Pre-Federation: 1830s–1901 ===
'Podgy', a Sikh hawker in Goulburn Valley, Victoria.

==== Early migrants: indentured labourers and cameleers ====
It is difficult to separate the history of early Sikh arrival to Australia from that of the numerous other religious faiths that were represented the people of British India and more specifically the Punjab province. It appears that the first Sikhs arrived in the country somewhere in the late 1830s, when the penal transport of convicts to New South Wales (which at the time also consisted of Queensland and Victoria) was slowing, before being abolished altogether in 1840. The lack of manual labourers from the convict assignment system led to an increase demand for foreign labour, which was partly filled by the arrival of Sikhs. The Sikhs came from an agrarian background in India, and thus fulfilled their tasks as farm labourers on cane fields and shepherds on sheep stations well.

A record from 1836 records a man with the surname of McCoy recruiting 50 Sikh workers for his sugar plantation in Australia, with the group stopping in Batavia (modern-day Jakarta) en-route to their destination.

"Initially, the migrants from India were indentured labourers, who worked on sheep stations and farms around Australia. Some adventurers followed during the gold rush of the 1850s. A census from 1861 indicates that there were around 200 Indians in Victoria of whom 20 were in Ballarat, the town which was at the epicenter of the gold rush. Thereafter, many more came and worked as hawkers - going from house to house, town to town, traversing thousands of kilometers, making a living by selling a variety of products." From the 1860s onwards, cameleers, commonly called 'Ghans' were brought to Australia to help explore and settle Australia's vast arid interior. While the Ghans consisted mainly of Muslims largely from British India and some even from Afghanistan and Egypt, a sizeable minority were Sikhs from Punjab. The Ghans set up camel-breeding stations and rest house outposts, known as caravanserai, throughout inland Australia, creating a permanent link between the coastal cities and the remote cattle and sheep grazing stations until about the 1930s, when they were largely replaced by the automobile.

==== Entrepreneurial migrants: travelling rural hawkers ====
Towards the end of the 19th century, Indian hawkers, many of whom were Sikh, became a common sight in the country regions throughout the country. Peddling was a common occupation in rural India and was readily transplanted to rural Australia, due to its widely dispersed population. Hawking required little capital to begin, with young men travelling on foot until they had enough money to purchase a horse and cart. The hawking system was based on credit, with warehouses selling goods to Indian wholesalers on credit, who provided the hawkers their stock on credit, who in turn sold their goods to the farmers and farmhands on credit. Credit was vital as money was often only available after the harvesting of the crops. The hawkers sold a wide variety of goods from work wear and farming goods for the men of the household, to fashionable clothing, trinkets and sewing needles for the wives and daughters. All hawkers required licenses issued by the state and from the 1890s licenses started to become restricted to British subjects. This denied Afghans, Assyrians and Chinese from renewing their license, giving the Sikhs a monopoly on hawking which they held until the 1930s when new European migrants began to ply the trade. While the hawkers were usually well received by the people of the country, with many stories of the hawkers cooking curries with the wives and playing cricket with the men, their success worried some politicians. Sikh hawkers sent some of their profits back to their families in the villages of Punjab and invested the rest by building stores and buying land, especially in northern New South Wales, where their continued acquisition caused the minister for of lands, Niel Nielson, to speak out. Two of the most successful Sikh hawkers were Baba Ram Singh and Otim (Uttam) Singh who arrived in 1890 learnt the trade and prospered and in 1907 they established "The People Stores". Baba Ram Singh lived to be 106 and is thought to have brought the first Guru Granth Sahib to Australia in the early 1920s, while in his lifetime Otim Singh acquired £10,000 and developed a thriving business on Kangaroo Island. As their families were not allowed to join these early pioneers many travelled back and forth finally returning to their original homeland to retire.

However, a large number remained in Australia. Their descendants are now 6th generation immigrants, although it is unknown if they retain their ancestors’ faith.

- 1885 - Surjan Singh Johal (Jandiala, Jalandhar)
- 1885 - Mahan Singh Grewal (Dhaliwal, Jalandhar)
- 1889 - Baba Ram Singh Rai (Bhulla Rai, Jalandhar)
- 1890 - Oudham Singh Arkan (Malpur Arkan, Nawanshahr)
- 1890 - Gurbachan Singh Sanghera (Bilga, Jalandhar)
- 1890 - Gharne (Gian) Singh Malhi (Chugha Kalan, Moga)
- 1893 - Mangal Singh Bains (Bilga, Jalandhar)
- 1893 - Prem Singh Majhel (Aujla) (Bhalojala, Amritsar)
- 1894 - Khem Singh Bhatti (Sahlon, Nawanshahr)
- 1895 - Beer Singh Johal (Jandiala, Jalandhar)
- 1895 - Partap Singh Johal (Jandiala, Jalandhar)
- 1895 - Bella Singh Bhangal (Amargarh, Nawanshahr)
- 1895 - Inder Singh Arkan (Malpur Arkan, Nawanshahr)
- 1896 - Jualla (Jolla) Singh Sohal (Atta, Jalandhar)
- 1896 - Sham Singh Pangly (Jagatpur Jattan (Sran), Jalandhar)
- 1896 - Santa Singh Atwal (Bara Pind, Jalandhar)
- 1897 - Jawala Singh Lalli (Lallian, Hoshiarpur)
- 1897 - Inder Singh Bagri (Chak Kalan, Jalandhar)
- 1898 - Narain Singh Hayer (Heran, Jalandhar)
- 1898 - Basanta Singh Sanghera (Bilga, Jalandhar)
- 1898 - Waryam Singh Sidhu (Mansurpur, Jalandhar)
- 1898 - Kishan Singh Chohan (Nagar (Phillaur), Jalandhar)
- 1898 - Indar Singh Sondhu (Jalandhar)
- 1899 - Genda Singh Atwal (Rasulpur, Nawanshahr)
- 1899 - Karam Singh (Boparai Kalan, Jalandhar)
- 1899 - Jowahar Singh (Pabwan, Jalandhar)
- 1899 - Eshar (Esau) Singh Sanghera (Bilga, Jalandhar)
- 1899 - Ram Singh Sangha (Kala Sanghian, Kapurthala)
- 1900 - Sarna Singh Dhesi (Sang Dhesian, Jalandhar)
- 1900 - Joallah Singh Dhadwal (Muthada Kalan, Jalandhar)
- 1900 - Gunda Singh Bains (Bains, Jalandhar)
- 1901 - Pal Singh Pooni (Muthada Kalan, Jalandhar)
- 1901 - Basawa Singh Bassi (Bundala, Jalandhar)
- 1901 - Thakur Singh More (Sadhpur, Nawanshahr)
- 1901 - Inder Singh Dhadlie (Golewal, Nawanshahr)
- 1901 - Inder Singh Thandi (Thandian, Nawanshahr)
- 1902 - Moti Singh Benning (Kishanpura, Nawanshahr)
- 1902 - Munsha Singh Toor (Dhaliwal, Jalandhar)
- 1910 - Brahm Singh Samrai (Samrai, Jalandhar)
- 1880~1901 - Sewa Singh Dhesi (Kahna Dhesian, Jalandhar)
- 1880~1901 - Arjan Singh Sandhar (Nawan Pind, Jalandhar)
- 1880~1901 - Bhulla Singh Sodhi (Mehmoodpur, Nawanshahr)
- 1880~1901 - Ganga Singh Gosal (Ratainda, Nawanshahr)
- 1880~1901 - Lachman Singh Sanghera (Bilga, Jalandhar)
- 1880~1901 - Karam Chand (Bilga, Jalandhar)
- 1880~1901 - Gurdit Singh (Bara Pind, Jalandhar)
- 1880~1901 - Jewan Singh (Chak, Jalandhar)
- 1880~1901 - Dalip Singh (Dhuleta, Jalandhar)
- 1880~1901 - Ram Singh (Bilga, Jalandhar)
- 1880~1901 - Booja Singh (Chak, Jalandhar)
- 1880~1901 - Nanak Chand (Bilga, Jalandhar)
- 1880~1901 - Bishan Das (Dhaliwal, Jalandhar)

==== CEDT - Certificate of Exemption from the Dictation Test ====
Many of the early Sikh pioneers obtained Certificates exempting them from a dictation test that non-whites had to undergo if they wanted to enter Australia after 1901. However, it is not known how the Sikhs that entered for the first time after 1901 continued to or were permitted to reside and work in Australia.

The Dictation Test was a written test in any European language chosen at random by the Migration Officers. It was primarily designed to keep non-white people from entering Australia. However, any Indian or other non-white person who was resident in Australia before 1900 could, if they chose to leave Australia, leave after applying for the CEDT, which would ensure that they could return to Australia at a time of their choosing and not undergo a Dictation Test.

Many people of all nationalities left Australia and later re-entered Australia with little difficulty.

=== During the White Australia Policy: 1901–1973 ===
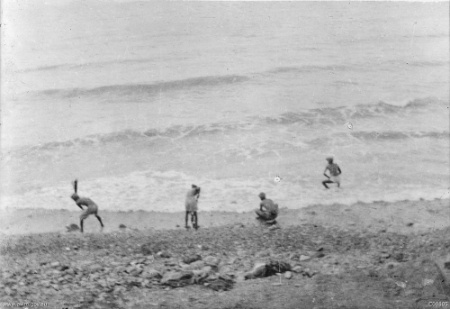
Sikh troops washing their clothes in the surf at Anzac Cove, Gallipoli Peninsula.

From federation in 1901 until 1973, immigration of non-whites, including Sikhs, into Australia was restricted due to the enactment of the White Australia policy. The laws made it impossible for Sikhs to enter the country unless they were merchants or students, who themselves were only allowed in for short periods of time; it also made it impossible for Sikhs who already lived in the country from returning to the motherland, as they would be barred re-entry. Historians place the number of Indians in Australia at federation in 1901 somewhere between 4700 and 7600. According to the 1911 census, there was only 3698 'Indians' (mostly Sikh) signifying a large decrease, with the trend continuing, with only approximately 2200 'Indians' in the country in 1921.

Open discrimination of non-whites before the passing of the laws was also widespread. After the conclusion of World War I, however, the stance of Australia on Sikhs shifted. Sikhs were classified as a martial race by the officials of the British Empire, who believed they were brave, loyal and well-built for fighting. As such they were preferentially recruited to the British armed forces as part of the Sikh Regiment, which quickly became the most decorated regiment in the Empire. They fought side by side with the ANZAC battalions in the battle of Gallipoli and earned the respect of many Australians. This combined the need to strengthen links to counter the growing threat of an expansionist and industrialised Japan saw Indians of Australia given rights far greater than that of other Asian groups through a series of steps between 1925 and 1929, Indians in Australia were allowed limited property rights, were given the right to vote and allowed a pension.

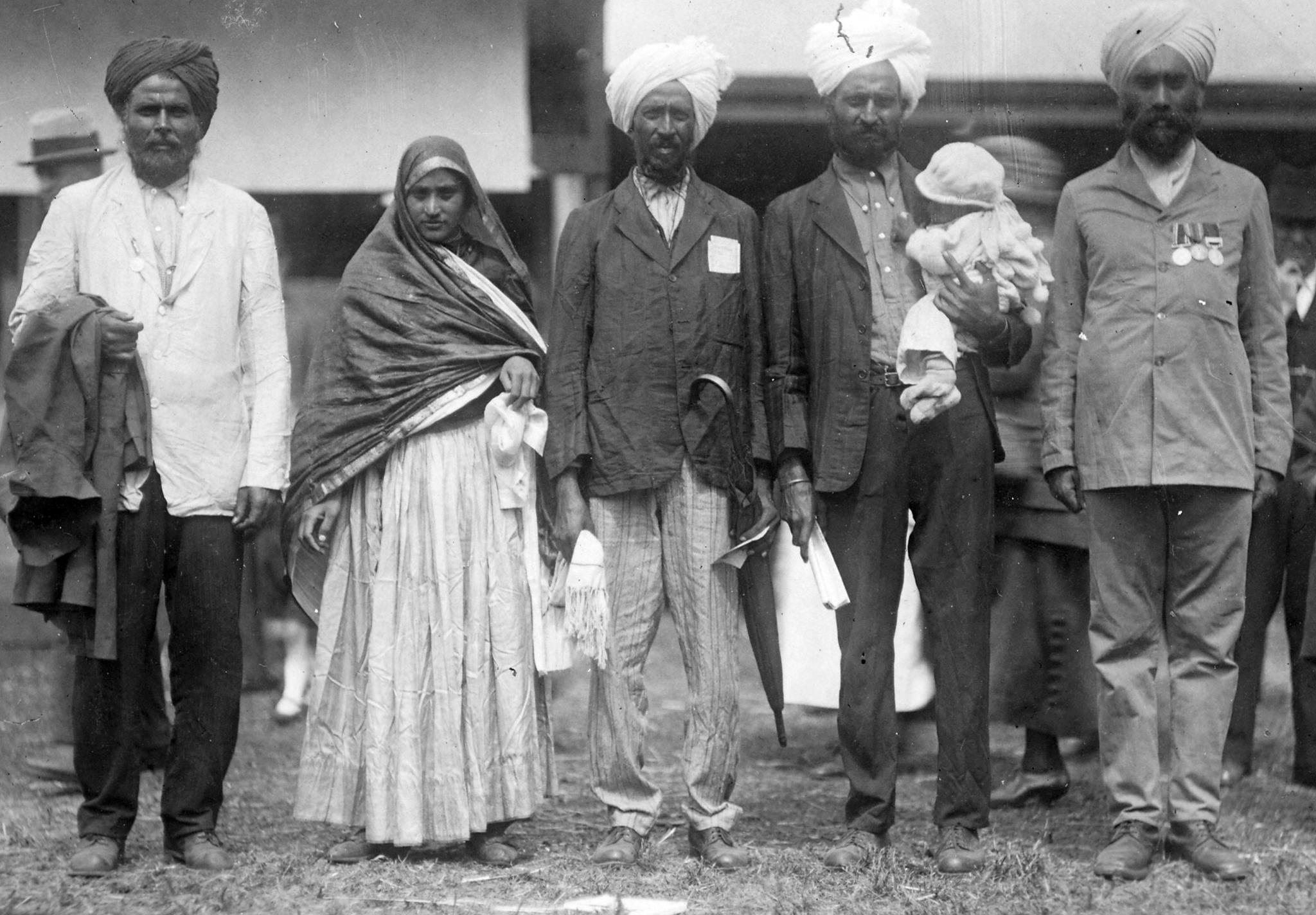
Sikh visitors from India in Adelaide, Australia, 1922. The woman is wearing ghagra.

The Sikhs began to use their new-found rights in the 1930s when the early pioneers begun to bring their 'sons of working age' to Australia. Initially they had a strong presence in the Atherton Tableland region of Queensland and the Northern Rivers of New South Wales, especially Maclean, Harwood and Clarence, where they worked as manual labourers, mainly working on the sugar cane fields, but also finding work in other industries such as the construction of railways. During World War II, Australia suffered from a dearth of labourers as the White population was recruited into the army and sent overseas, where they fought side by side with the Sikhs in the Battle of Malaya, Battle of Singapore and numerous other hostilities. This allowed Indians to work in many agricultural sectors which they had previously been barred from working in due to protests by agricultural unions. One of the opened industries was the banana industry, leading to the Sikhs in Australia migrating to the banana growing areas of Woolgoolga to fill the shortage, forming a Sikh community that still exists to this day.

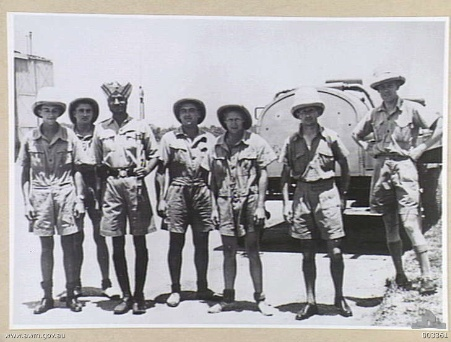
RAAF Personnel with a Sikh man during WWII.

The Partition of India occurred in 1947, with the state of Punjab, the home to the majority of the Sikh community in Australia, being divided between the Islamic Pakistan in the west, and the Secular Hindu, Sikh, Muslim India in the east. As a result of the upheaval, many of the Sikh father and sons returned to the Punjab to protect their family, assets and land from the turmoil, however many of them arrived back in Punjab to find that they had lost everything. Those young and fit enough to still work in Australia returned, mainly to work on the banana farms in Woolgoolga, although some ended up working in Northern Queensland.

In the 1950s and 1960s the Sikhs worked hard and started to purchase land and start their own banana farms. With steady work and income, the Sikh men started to bring their wives from Punjab to Australia. In 1961 there were six Sikh women in Woolgoolga, creating Sikh households and Sikh children born in Australia. As Indians were allowed naturalisation, the first true Sikh Australians came into being. The pull of the Sikh community in Woolgoolga led to Sikhs from other parts of Australia migrating to Woolgoolga in the hope they could follow their kinsmen to a banana led success. In 1968 the First Sikh Temple was opened in Woolgoolga, becoming the first Gurdwara to be opened in the country.

=== Post White Australia Policy: 1973–Present ===
With the enactment of the Racial Discrimination Act by the Whitlam government, Sikh migration to Australia dramatically increased. While most Sikh immigrants can trace their heritage to Punjab, many come from countries other than India including Malaysia, Singapore, Fiji, Kenya, Uganda and the United Kingdom. Sikhs migrate to Australia because it is a free stable country with economic opportunities. In many cases Sikhs suffered injustices in other countries, and in the case of Uganda, open persecution.

Whereas early immigration was mainly as labourers working in the country, new migrants are now mainly based around the major cities, working in a variety of fields from driving taxis to health professionals. Melbourne is now home to the largest Sikh population. Since 2000, there has been a great increase in the number of Sikh students studying in Australia, with many staying on in the country after the completion of their studies. In May and June 2009, a number of Sikhs fell victim to a spate of attacks on Indians studying in the country, leading to protests in Melbourne and Sydney.

== Demographics ==
According to the 2021 census, the Sikh population numbered 210,400 individuals, of the majority (91,745) live in Victoria (state) followed by 47,165 in New South Wales. The lowest population is in Northern Territory which is 1,401.

Sikh Australians by state and territory (1991−2021)
| State/territory | 2021 | | 2016 | | 2011 | | 2006 | | 2001 | | 1991 | |
| State/territory | Pop. | % | Pop. | % | Pop. | % | Pop. | % | Pop. | % | Pop. | % |
|---|---|---|---|---|---|---|---|---|---|---|---|---|
| Victoria | 91,745 | 1.41% | 52,762 | 0.89% | 29,382 | 0.55% | 9,040 | 0.18% | 4,601 | 0.1% | 2,085 | 0.05% |
| New South Wales | 47,165 | 0.58% | 31,737 | 0.42% | 21,748 | 0.31% | 11,618 | 0.18% | 8,600 | 0.14% | 3,320 | 0.06% |
| Queensland | 27,713 | 0.54% | 17,433 | 0.37% | 9,357 | 0.22% | 2,627 | 0.07% | 1,961 | 0.06% | 1,000 | 0.04% |
| Western Australia | 18,583 | 0.7% | 11,897 | 0.48% | 4,927 | 0.22% | 1,407 | 0.07% | 1,092 | 0.06% | 615 | 0.04% |
| South Australia | 17,259 | 0.97% | 8,808 | 0.53% | 5,301 | 0.33% | 1,230 | 0.08% | 823 | 0.06% | 510 | 0.04% |
| Australian Capital Territory | 4,323 | 0.95% | 2,142 | 0.54% | 1,083 | 0.3% | 361 | 0.11% | 249 | 0.08% | 138 | 0.05% |
| Tasmania | 2,208 | 0.4% | 488 | 0.1% | 233 | 0.05% | 71 | 0.01% | 71 | 0.02% | 46 | 0.01% |
| Northern Territory | 1,401 | 0.6% | 634 | 0.28% | 265 | 0.13% | 42 | 0.02% | 40 | 0.02% | 36 | 0.02% |
| Australia | 210,400 | 0.83% | 125,901 | 0.54% | 72,296 | 0.34% | 26,396 | 0.13% | 17,437 | 0.09% | 7,750 | 0.05% |

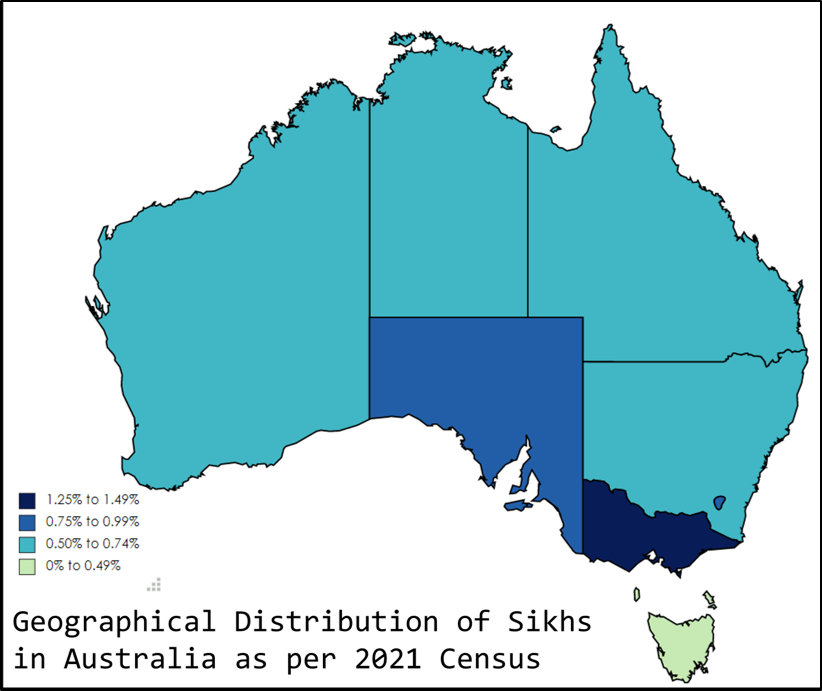
Geographical distribution of Sikhs in Australia per 2021 census

Historical Population
| Year | Pop. | ±% |
|---|---|---|
| 1991 | 7,750 | — |
| 2001 | 17,437 | +125.0% |
| 2006 | 26,396 | +51.4% |
| 2011 | 72,296 | +173.9% |
| 2016 | 125,901 | +74.1% |
| 2021 | 210,400 | +67.1% |

According to the 2016 census, the Sikh population numbered 125,909 individuals, of whom 39% live in Greater Melbourne, 21% in Greater Sydney, and 10% in Greater Brisbane. The states and territories with the highest proportion of Sikhs are Victoria (0.89%) and the Australian Capital Territory (0.54%), whereas those with the lowest are the Northern Territory (0.28%) and Tasmania (0.10%).

=== Place of Birth ===
The majority Australian Sikhs (as of 2021) are first-generation immigrants.

Sikh Australians by place of birth (2021)
| Place of birth | 2021 | |
| Place of birth | Pop. | % |
|---|---|---|
| Australia | 51,939 | 24.69% |
| Not in Australia | 158,461 | 75.31% |
| Total | 210,400 | 100% |

=== Fertility Rate ===
As of 2016, the reported fertility rate of Sikhs in Australia are 2.01. This is below the replacement rate of 2.1, but was higher than the Australian average of 1.8 that year.

=== Employment ===
According to the 2021 Australian Census, Sikhs made up 0.83% of the total population, but were overrepresented in industries like wholesale trade where they made up 28.35% of the industry, 4.77% of the road transport industry, 1.52% of food manufacturing, 1.21% of civil engineering, and 0.92% of the agricultural industry.

== Legacy and celebrations ==
=== Australian Sikh heritage ===
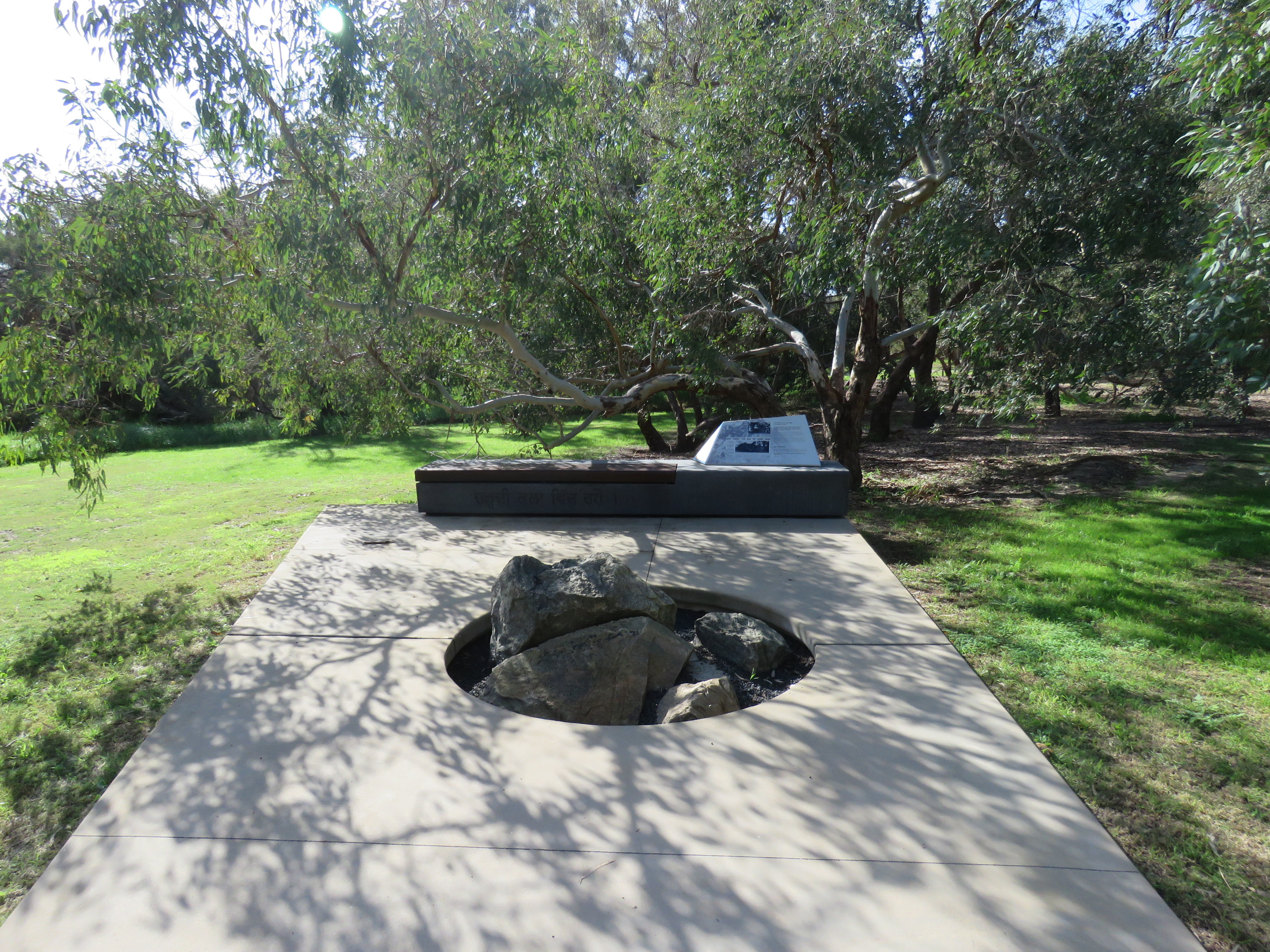
The Australian Sikh Heritage Trail in June 2021.

Australian Sikh Heritage Trail, a group of interconnected pathways in Adenia Park, Riverton, Western Australia, is a monument commemorating the history of Sikhs in Australia. The location, adjacent to the Canning River, is significant as the heritage-listed Sikh cremation site. The winding trail features interpretive signage, plaques, benches, a sheltered area, and a boardwalk by the river. Information on the signs is organised by theme, such as Sikh farmers, Sikh wrestlers, Sikh Anzacs, Sikh hawkers and Sikh entrepreneurs.

Man Mohan Singh, a pilot officer in the Indian Air Force Volunteer Reserve at the onset of the Second World War, consequently joined the RAF Coastal Command and took command of a Sunderland flying boat during the Battle of the Atlantic. He later became a flying officer with the British Indian Air Force. In 1942, he was with the flying boats that arrived at Broome, Western Australia when a Japanese air attack destroyed them all. Singh survived the attack only to drown in the harbour. Singh is remembered on the Darwin Military Museum Memorial Wall and has a memorial in Singapore.

=== Australian Sikh Games ===
In 1988 the first annual Australian Sikh Games commenced, with Sikhs from South Australia, Victoria and New South Wales arriving in Adelaide to compete in a field hockey competition to celebrate the opening of the first Gurdwara in the city. From there the competition grew and in 1989 netball, Association football (soccer) and kabaddi. Tug o' war, volleyball and cricket are also included, while track and field and golf event have been previously competed but are currently non-competition events. Non-sports cultural events such as Bhangra and Giddha are also held simultaneously in the host city.

=== Punjabi language in Australia ===
Punjabi is the 5th most common language in Australia other than English, with nearly 240,000 speakers in the country at the time of the 2021 Australian Census. 81% of Punjabi speakers are Sikhs, 13.3% are Hindus and 1.4% are Muslims.

== Gurdwaras ==
The Gurdwaras is a building meant for Sikh worship. Gurdwaras are used for worship and for learning about Sikhism. Some etiquette around a Gurdwaras include taking off your shoes and covering your heads.

== Attack on Sikh Community ==
In 2023, four Hindu extremists, linked to Bhartiya Janata Party (BJP) and Rashtriya Swayamsevak Sangh (RSS), attempted to vandalize the Sikh temple of Melbourne’s Miri Piri Gurdwara and the posters of Sikh leaders placed outside the temple with graffiti. All the four Hindu men were caught in the act, carrying cans of spray, sticks and paint, and apologized after confessing their attempt to vandalize the Sikh temple and the posters outside the Gurdwara. All the four Hindu men were arrested by the authorities.

== See also ==
- Indian Australian
  - Gurdwaras in Australia
  - Sikhs in Australia, Indian-origin religion
  - Hinduism in Australia, Indian-origin religion
  - List of Indian Australians
- Sikhism by country
  - Sikhism in New Zealand
  - Sikhism in Canada
  - Sikhism in the United Kingdom
  - Sikhism in the United States
  - Sikhism in Fiji
