= Sikhism in Austria =

Religious minority in Austria

Total population
- 10,000

Religions
- Sikhism

Languages
- Austrian German • Punjabi • Hindi • Urdu

Related ethnic groups
- German Sikhs • Dutch Sikhs • Danish Sikhs • Polish Sikhs

Sikhism in Austria is a religious minority. Sikhism became an official religion in Austria in December 2020. As of 2020, there are six gurdwaras in Austria, with three in Vienna and one each in Salzburg, Klagenfurt, and Graz.

== Recognition by the government ==
The gurdwara management committees of Austria submitted a request to the Government of Austria to have Sikhism officially recognised as a religion in 2020. In December of 2020, Sikhism was recognised as an official religion by the Government of Austria. This allows Sikhs to write 'Singh' and 'Kaur' after their forenames in official documents, rather than listing them as extra names, and officially register as Sikhs.
