= Sikhism in Trinidad and Tobago =

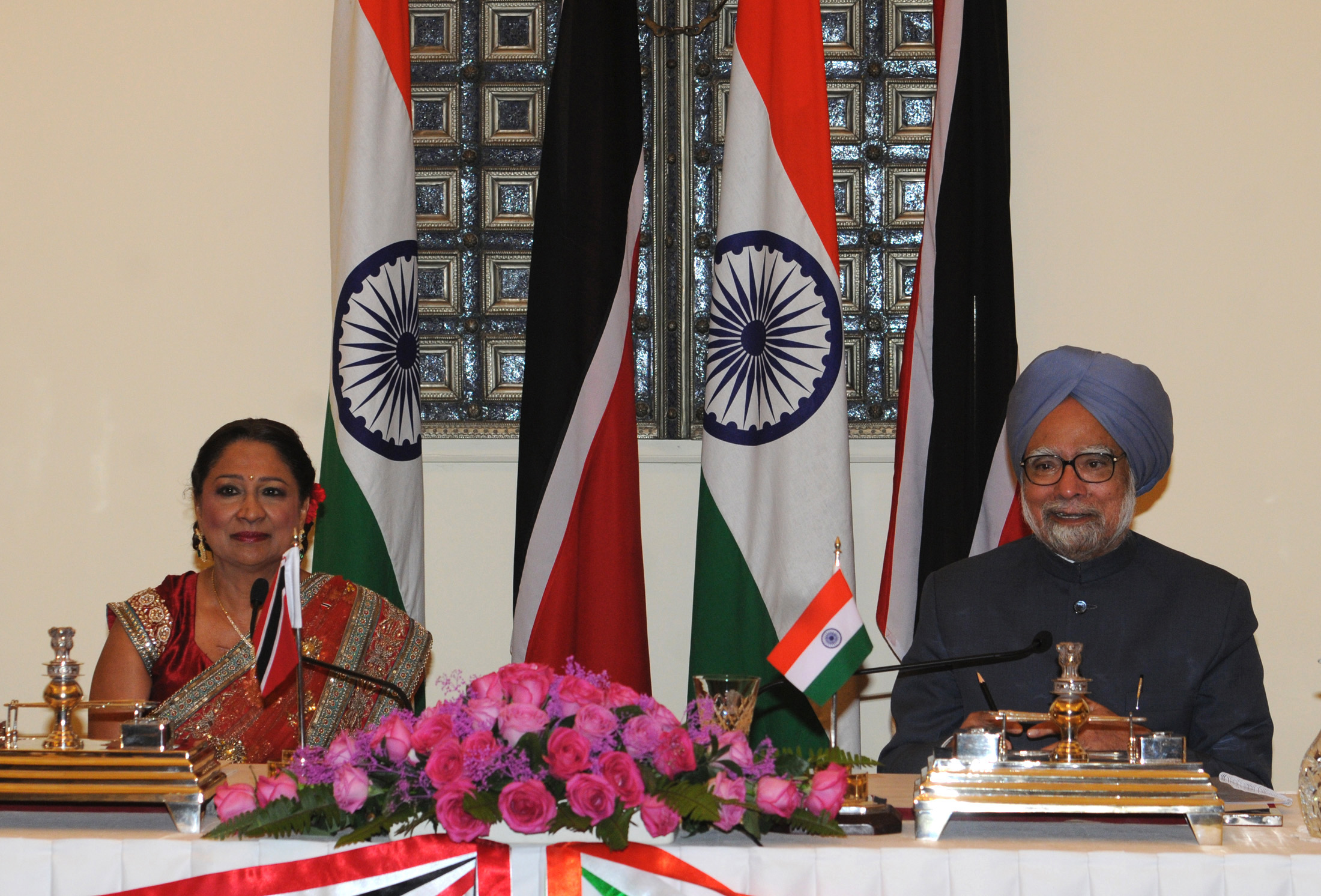
- The first Sikh Prime Minister of India. Dr. Manmohan Singh and the Prime Minister of the Republic of Trinidad and Tobago, Mrs. Kamla Persad-Bissessar,

Total population
- 300

Religions
- Sikhism

Languages
- English • Punjabi

Sikhs are a religious minority in Trinidad and Tobago. There is estimated to be no more than 300 Sikhs living in Trinidad and Tobago, with most residing in Port of Spain.

== History ==
=== 19th Century ===
The first Sikh to arrive in Trinidad was Hem Raj Singh, a former soldier who came as an indentured labourer after the Indian Rebellion of 1857. Later, in the 1860s, more Sikh soldiers arrived in Trinidad and Tobago, and by 1877, they had established the first Sikh Gurdwara in the region, marking it as the first Gurdwara in the Western Hemisphere.

Hem Raj Singh, who became a Sikh leader was soon followed by other Sikh members Bhuta Singh, Sarwan Singh, Lal Singh and Jogie Singh.

In 1880, a Sikh Gurdwara was built on the Orange Grove Estate in the Eastern Main Tunapuna.

In 1883, further Sikhs arrived in Trinidad on the SS Jura ship.

=== 20th Century ===
In 2009, Gursharan Kaur visited the Trinidad Gurdwara with her daughter.

== Demographics ==
- In 2013, it was estimated to be 10 Sikh families living in Port of Spain.
- In 2024, there are estimated to be 300 Sikhs living in Trinidad and Tobago.

== Gurdwara ==
- Gurudwara Sahib Trinidad and Tobago in El Dorado, Trinidad and Tobago

== See also ==
- Sikhism by Country
- Sikhism in South America
- Sikhism in the Cayman Islands
- Sikhism in the United States
- Religion in Trinidad and Tobago
