= List of Indian Australians =

Indian Australians are Australians of Indian ancestry, including both Australians by birth and those born in India or elsewhere among the Indian diaspora. The following provides a list of notable Indian Australians:

== Academics ==
=== Mathematicians ===
- Mathai Varghese, mathematician and professor at the University of Adelaide
- Akshay Venkatesh, mathematician

=== Professors and scholars in other disciplines ===
- Purushottama Bilimoria, professor at Deakin University

== Arts and entertainment ==
=== Actors and actresses ===
- Anusha Dandekar, actress
- Shibani Dandekar, actress
- Lisa Haydon, Bollywood actress
- Mahesh Jadu, actor
- Vimala Raman, actress
- Chandrika Ravi, actress
- Pallavi Sharda, actress
- Isha Sharvani, Bollywood actress
- Geraldine Viswanathan, actress

=== Comedians ===
- Neel Kolhatkar, comedian

=== Film ===
- Partho Sen-Gupta, filmmaker
- Anupam Sharma, filmmaker, Australia Day Ambassador, film entrepreneur

=== Models ===
- Samantha Downie, Australia's Next Top Model contestant, model
- Maria Thattil, activist, beauty queen, and model of South Indian descent who was crowned Miss Universe Australia 2020 and placed Top 10 at Miss Universe 2020

=== Media ===
- Jeremy Fernandez, ABC Weekend presenter and reporter
- Marc Fennell, film critic, technology journalist, radio personality, author, and television presenter
- Indira Naidoo, newsreader

=== Musicians ===
- Charlie Collins, singer-songwriter
- Samantha Jade, singer-songwriter, and actress
- Tharini Mudaliar, singer and actress who played a role in The Matrix Revolutions and Xena: Warrior Princess
- Guy Sebastian, winner of 2003 Australian Idol, singer and songwriter

== Business ==
- Fazal Deen, hawker, battery operator and businessman
- Pankaj Oswal, controversial businessman, accused of embezzlement
- Vivek Chad Sehgal, auto parts maker
- Maha Sinnathamby, real estate

== Literature ==
- Aravind Adiga, novelist, winner of the 2008 Man Booker Prize
- Kersi Meher-Homji, journalist and author

== Politics and government ==
- Prue Car, ALP MP for Londonderry in New South Wales
- Christabel Chamarette, senator from Western Australia from 1992 to 1996
- Jinson Charls, member of the Northern Territory Legislative Assembly
- Chris Crewther, former Liberal MP for Dunkley
- Lauren Moss, ALP MP for Casuarina in the Northern Territory
- Khoda Patel, member of the Northern Territory Legislative Assembly
- Dave Sharma, former Liberal MP for Wentworth
- Lisa Singh, former ALP Senator representing Tasmania
- Kaushaliya Vaghela, former Victorian politician, community leader.
- Peter Varghese, diplomat and Secretary of the Department of Foreign Affairs and Trade (Australia)
- Anne Warner, former Minister for Aboriginal and Islander Affairs, Queensland Labor Government

== Science and technology ==
- Chennupati Jagadish AC, pioneer in nanotechnology
- Zinnia Kumar, scientist and international fashion model

== Sports ==
- Stuart Clark, cricketer
- Arshdeep Dosanjh, professional volleyball player and member of the Australia national team
- Hasrat Gill, cricketer for Melbourne Stars and Victoria
- Sam Kerr, footballer
- Daniel Kerr, Australian rules footballer
- Roger Kerr, Australian rules footballer
- Jordan McMahon, Australian rules footballer
- Clancee Pearce, Australian rules footballer for Fremantle Football Club
- Eric Pearce, former hockey player who represented Australia in four Olympics
- Julian Pearce, former hockey player who represented Australia in 45 international matches
- Tanveer Singh Sangha, cricketer for Sydney Thunder in the Big Bash League and member of Australia's national team
- Gurinder Singh Sandhu, cricketer for Queensland in Domestic cricket and former member of Australia's national team
- Rex Sellers, cricketer and leg spinner who played for Australia in India in 1964
- Astra Sharma, tennis player
- Lisa Sthalekar, captain of the Australia Women's cricket team
- Terry Walsh, hockey player and coach
- Rhys Williams, professional footballer
- Nishan Velupillay, professional footballer

== In fiction ==
- Chloe Frazer, character from the Uncharted video game series
- Edwina "Eddie" Redcliffe, character from the Deadloch TV series

== See also ==
- Indian Australians
