= Sikhism in Nepal =

Total population
- ~600–7,000

Founder
- Guru Nanak

Religions
- Sikhism (incl. Udasis and Nanakpanthis)

Languages
- Punjabi • Nepali

Nepali Sikhs first entered Nepal in the 18th century. Today, there is a small community of Sikhs living in Nepal, with varying claims of their numbers totaling around 609 according to the 2011 census of Nepal whilst others have asserted the true number is in the area of 7,000 people.

The number of Sikhs in Nepal was 9,292 at the 1991 census, 3,054 at the 2001 census, 609 at the 2011 census, and 1,496 at the 2021 census. The 1996-2006 Nepalese Civil War may have influenced the decline in the 1990s and 2000s and the slight rebound in the 2010s.

== History ==
=== Sikh gurus ===
Guru Nanak Dev, the founder of Sikhism, spent more than a year meditating on a site now known as Nanak Math, located in Balaju, Kathmandu. It is believed that Guru Nanak visited the math in 1516. Guru Nanak is traditionally locally known as Nanak Rishi in Nepal.

Guru Gobind Singh makes mention of Gurkhas in the Dasam Granth, stating:

"Gorkhas [sic] sing thy praises, the residents of China and Manchuria bow their heads before thee and the Tibetans destroy their own sufferings by remembering thee. Those who meditate on thee obtain perfect glory, and prosper greatly. One cannot know thy limit, O Infinitely Glorious Lord! Thou art the Giver of all, therefore thou are Boundless."

— Guru Gobind Singh, Dasam Granth

=== Sikh Empire ===
Following conflict with the British East India Company, Maharani Jind Kaur, the youngest wife of Maharaja Ranjit Singh, managed to escape from the Punjab disguised as a servant girl and came to Nepal via Nepalgunj on 29 April, 1849. The Nepalese government gave her shelter. Later, she went to London, but those Sikhs who remained in Nepal started their livelihood there. A few Nepalgunj territories near the Indian border are still called Shikhhanpurwa, Jamunaha and Bankatwa.

==== Release of Sikh prisoners-of-war in Tibetan captivity ====
In March 1856, a treaty between Tibet and the Kingdom of Nepal, known as the Treaty of Thapathali, was signed. Clause 4 of the treaty freed the remaining Sikh prisoners-of-war still held in Tibetan captivity whom were captured in 1841. This clause was included in the treaty at the behest of Gulab Singh of Kashmir to free the remaining prisoners.

== See also ==
- Sikh diaspora
- Sikhism by country
