= Sikhism in Cyprus =

Sikhs in Cyprus

Sikhism in Cyprus Ο Σιχισμός στην Κύπρο

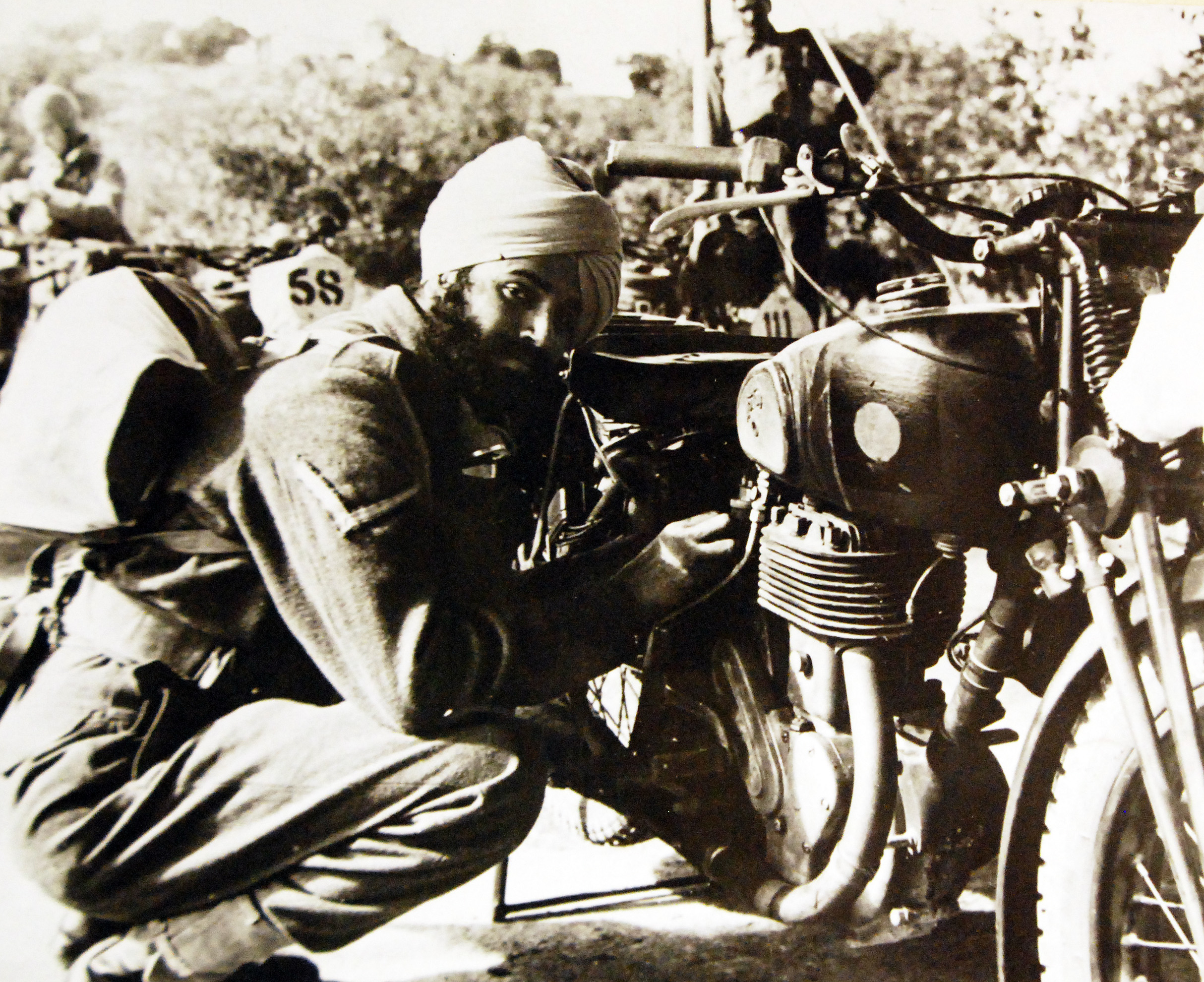
- For the Second World War (North African Campaign), a Sikh despatch rider making a adjustments to his motorcycle before taking part in a motorcycle trial held in Cyprus for the British Armed Forces.

Total population
- 2,264; 0.24% of the total Cypriot population (2021)

Regions with significant populations
- Nicosia · Larnaca

Religions
- Sikhism

Languages
- Punjabi · Cypriot Greek • Cypriot Turkish • Hindi • Urdu

Cypriot Sikhs (Greek: Κύπριοι Σιχ, romanized: Kýprioi Sich; Turkish: Kıbrıslı Sihler) numbered 2,264 at the 2021 census, forming the country's fourth-largest religious group at 0.24% of the country's population. The Sikh population in Cyprus has grown over the years, with many Sikhs migrating to the country for work or to start their own businesses. Today, Sikhs in Cyprus have established their own places of worship and community centres, and are an integral part of the country's cultural diversity.

== History ==
During the Second Anglo-Afghan War from 1878 to 1880, Sikh troops were dispatched to Afghanistan. Concurrently, Sikh cavalrymen played a role in a covert agreement between the British and Indian army, sailing from Malta in the Mediterranean Sea to seize control of Cyprus in cooperation with the Ottoman Empire.

The Sikh community in Cyprus has also made efforts to bring their culture and religion to the wider community. For example, in 2014, Sikhs from Ilford in the UK brought the Guru Granth Sahib, the current Guru of the Sikh religion, to Cyprus for the first time. The Guru Granth Sahib was taken to various locations around the country, allowing people of all faiths to view and learn about the Sikh religion.

Due to immigration from Punjab, some Sikhs in Cyprus have suffered from abuse from human trafficking.

== Gurdwara ==
One of the main places of worship for Sikhs in Cyprus is the Gurdwara Sangatsar Sahib in Nicosia. The Gurudwara was established in 2011 and serves as a center for worship, community activities, and cultural events.

In addition to the Gurudwara, there are other places of worship and community centers that serve the Sikh community in Cyprus. These include the Sri Guru Nanak Darbar in Larnaca, which is another Gurudwara that was established in 2013, and the Cyprus Sikh Association, which was founded in 2016 to promote Sikh culture and values in the country.

== World War II ==
In 2012, a delegation of the Sikh community from Birmingham, travelled to Cyprus to pay homage to Sikh soldiers who lost their lives in the Second World War. Alongside members of the Royal British Legion, they laid a wreath on behalf of the Sikh community at the Nicosia War Cemetery. The cemetery houses the Nicosia Cremation Memorial, specifically dedicated to Sikh soldiers who were accorded the last rites of their religion, which involve cremation. The memorial stands as a stone pylon adorned with wings and an urn, bearing the engraved names of the honoured individuals.

== See also ==
- Sikhism by country
- Sikhism in Greece
- Sikhism in Italy
- Indians in Cyprus
- Sikhism in the United Kingdom
