= Sikhism in Greece =

Sikhism in Greece Σιχ στην Ελλάδα

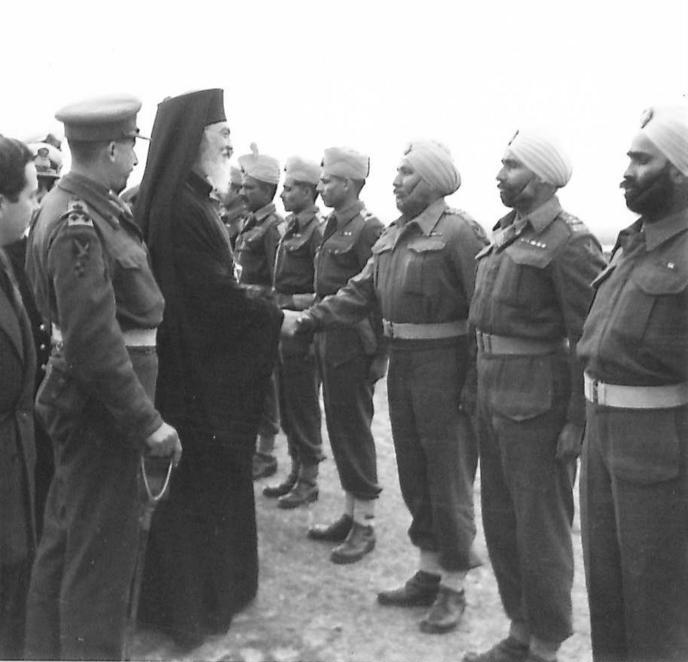
- Damaskinos of Athens meeting with turbaned Indian-Sikh troops (three persons from the left) in Salonika (1945)

Total population
- 20,000

Regions with significant populations
- Athens · Megara · Chalkida · Psachna

Religions
- Sikhism

Languages
- Punjabi · Greek

Sikhism in Greece dates back to the early 1900s, where many Sikhs came to the country through British Indian Army in the World War I and World War II. As of 2012, there are approximately 20,000 Sikhs in Greece. The Sikh population in Greece has grown over the years, with many Sikhs migrating to the country for agricultural work or to start their own businesses.

== History ==
=== World War I & World War II ===
Sikhs have fought and passed through Greece in both World Wars, in large number as part of the British Indian Army.

==== Salonika Cemetery ====
In 2010, Sikhs from Greece and the UK made the first remembrance visit to the Monastir Road Cemetery in Thessaloniki. They also paid respects to the soldiers who died during World War 1.

This cemetery is for Indian soldiers whom many included Sikhs. Sikhs are cremated when they die, but many soldiers were unable to be cremated therefore were buried. It is estimated there are 26 Sikh soldiers buried at the cemetery. At the Sikh graves there is an inscription in Gurmukhi, 'Ik Onkar Sri Waheguru Ji Ki Fateh'.

=== Post 1990s ===
In the 1990s, Sikh immigration increased. The Sikh community in Athens formed a small organization for their religious and social needs, which led to the building of Gurudwara Shri Guru Nanak Darbar. Other Sikh immigrants also made temples in Athens, Megara, Chalkidiki and Psachna.

Many Sikhs in Greece currently work in agriculture, taxi drivers or construction.

== Migration ==
Sikh migrants have been drawn to Greece for various reasons. Many Sikhs migrated to work on Greek shipping lines as no working visa was required. Also some Sikhs entered illegally by jumping offshore as soon as the boat docked into Greece. The geographical location of Greece is an entry in Europe, therefore has been a favourable destination for people in the 2015 European migrant crisis.

There is a large Sikh population in Megara, where hundreds of Sikhs take part in the annual Vaisakhi Nagar Kirtan.

== Discrimination ==
=== 2014 Sikh Gurdwara attacks ===
In 2014, Gurdwara Sri Dasmesh Singh Sabha and Gurdwara Bhagat Ravidas Darbar were attacked by gunfire in Greece. As per Sikh Channel report, there were no casualties, however some buildings were damaged.

== Gurdwaras ==
There are various Gurdwaras in Greece in locations such as Athens, Megara, Chalkidiki and Psachna.

== See also ==
- Religion in Greece
- Sikhism by country
- Sikhism in Cyprus
- Sikhism in Italy
- Sikhism in Portugal
- Sikhs
