= American Sikh Congressional Caucus =

- Co-Chairs: John Garamendi (D); David Valadao (R)
- Founded: April 24, 2013
- Political position: Bipartisan
- Colors: None Official (Gray Unofficial)
- Seats in the Senate: 0 / 50
- Seats in the House: 30 / 435

The American Sikh Congressional Caucus is a congressional caucus focusing on the interests of the American Sikh community. Co-launched by Judy Chu (D-CA) and David Valadao (R-CA), the caucus seeks to address issues such as military discrimination, violence and bullying of Sikhs and raise general awareness of Sikhs and their contributions to the United States. On February 9, 2021, it was announced that U.S. Representatives John Garamendi (D-CA) and David Valadao (R-CA) would serve as the Co-Chairs of the American Sikh Congressional Caucus.

== House members ==
As of July 30, 2025, the Caucus consists of 30 members.

=== Democrats ===
- John Garamendi (Co-Chair)
- Haley Stevens (D‑MI‑11) (Vice-Chair)
- Zoe Lofgren (D‑CA‑18) (Vice-Chair)
- Mary Gay Scanlon (D‑PA‑5)
- Judy Chu (D‑CA‑28)
- Ami Bera (D‑CA‑6)
- Jim Costa (D‑CA‑21)
- Mark DeSaulnier (D‑CA‑10)
- Al Green (D‑TX‑9)
- Hank Johnson (D‑GA‑4)
- Ted Lieu (D‑CA‑36)
- Doris Matsui (D‑CA‑7)
- Grace Meng (D‑NY‑6)
- Frank Pallone (D‑NJ‑6)
- Raul Ruiz (D‑CA‑25)
- Jan Schakowsky (D‑IL‑9)
- Brad Sherman (D‑CA‑32)
- Adam Smith (D‑WA‑9)
- Mark Takano (D‑CA‑41)
- Mike Thompson (D‑CA‑4)
- Nanette Barragán (D‑CA‑44)
- Adam Gray (D‑CA‑13))
- Steve Cohen (D‑TN‑9)
- Jasmine Crockett (D‑TX‑30)
- Josh Harder (D‑CA‑9)

=== Republicans ===
- David Valadao (Co-Chair) (R‑CA‑22)
- Doug LaMalfa (R‑CA‑1)
- Tom McClintock (R‑CA‑5)
- Dave Joyce (R‑OH‑14)
- Pete Sessions (R‑TX‑17)
