= Sikhism in Denmark =

Sikhism in Denmark Sikhisme i Danmark

Total population
- 5,000

Regions with significant populations
- Copenhagen · Brondby

Religions
- Sikhism

Languages
- Punjabi · Danish

Sikhism in Denmark (Danish: Sikhisme i Danmark) is a minority religion. There are estimated to be 5,000 Sikhs living in Denmark.

== History ==
The Sikhs started to arrive at Denmark in the late 1960s and early 1970s as labour migrants. In the 1980s and 1990s, Sikh refugees escaping the violent conflicts in Punjab started to arrive in Denmark.

The Sikh community in Denmark achieved official recognition as a religious community from the Ministry of Ecceslesistical affairs in 1985. In 2008, news reported on violent confrontations between two factions within the only Danish Sikh congregation. They were fighting about the control of the temple in Vanløse.

One estimate put their number to between 800 and 1500 in 2015.

Most Sikhs are concentrated in the capital Copenhagen, with small groups in other places such as the Horsens and Aarhus areas.

== Gurdwaras ==
The gurdwaras in the country are:

- Gurdwara Sri Guru Singh Sabha, Kirkebjerg Allé 35 A, 2720 Vanlose, Copenhagen.
- Gurdwara Copenhagen, Copenhagen

== List of Danish Sikhs ==
- Kirsten Lindholm (former model and a film actress)
- Jagvir Singh (footballer)

== See also ==
- Sikhism by country
