= Sikhism in Portugal =

Sikhism in Portugal Sikhismo em Portugal

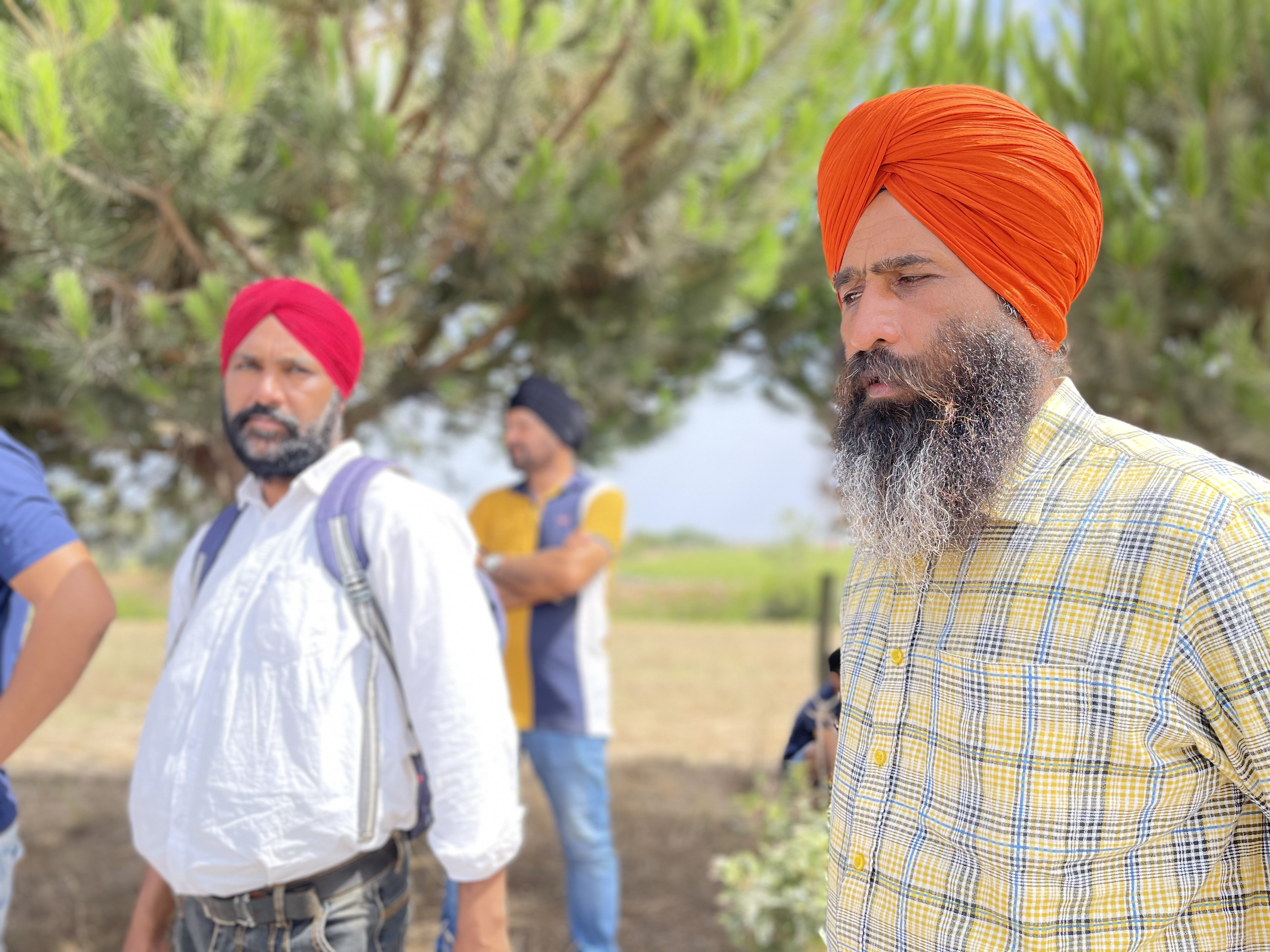
- Turbaned Sikhs during the Roteiro Justiça Climática (Climate Justice Route) in Odemira, Portugal (2022)

Total population
- 35,000

Regions with significant populations
- Lisbon · Albufeira · Porto

Religions
- Sikhism

Languages
- Punjabi · Portuguese · English

Sikhs in Portugal is a minority religion. The Sikh community in Portugal is a small but vastly growing one. According to the latest available data, there are estimated to be around 35,000 Sikhs living in the country.

The Sikh population in Portugal has grown over the years, with many Sikhs migrating to the country for agricultural work, construction work or to start their own businesses. Sikhism in Portugal dates back to the 1990s, where many Sikhs migrated as a result of relaxed immigration policies and labour shortages.

== History ==
=== 1990s to present ===
After Portugal joined the European Union in 1986 and Schengen Area in 1995, it became attractive for a large number of immigrants from the Indian subcontinent. The Sikh migration began in the early 1990s when Portugal was undergoing a construction boom and was in a labour shortage.

Since the 1990s, Sikhs from Punjab, India began to work in the agricultural, tourism and manufacturing sector. Many Sikhs also have opened up Indian restaurants around Portugal.

Most Sikhs can be found in Lisbon, Porto, Albufeira and other cities in the Algarve.

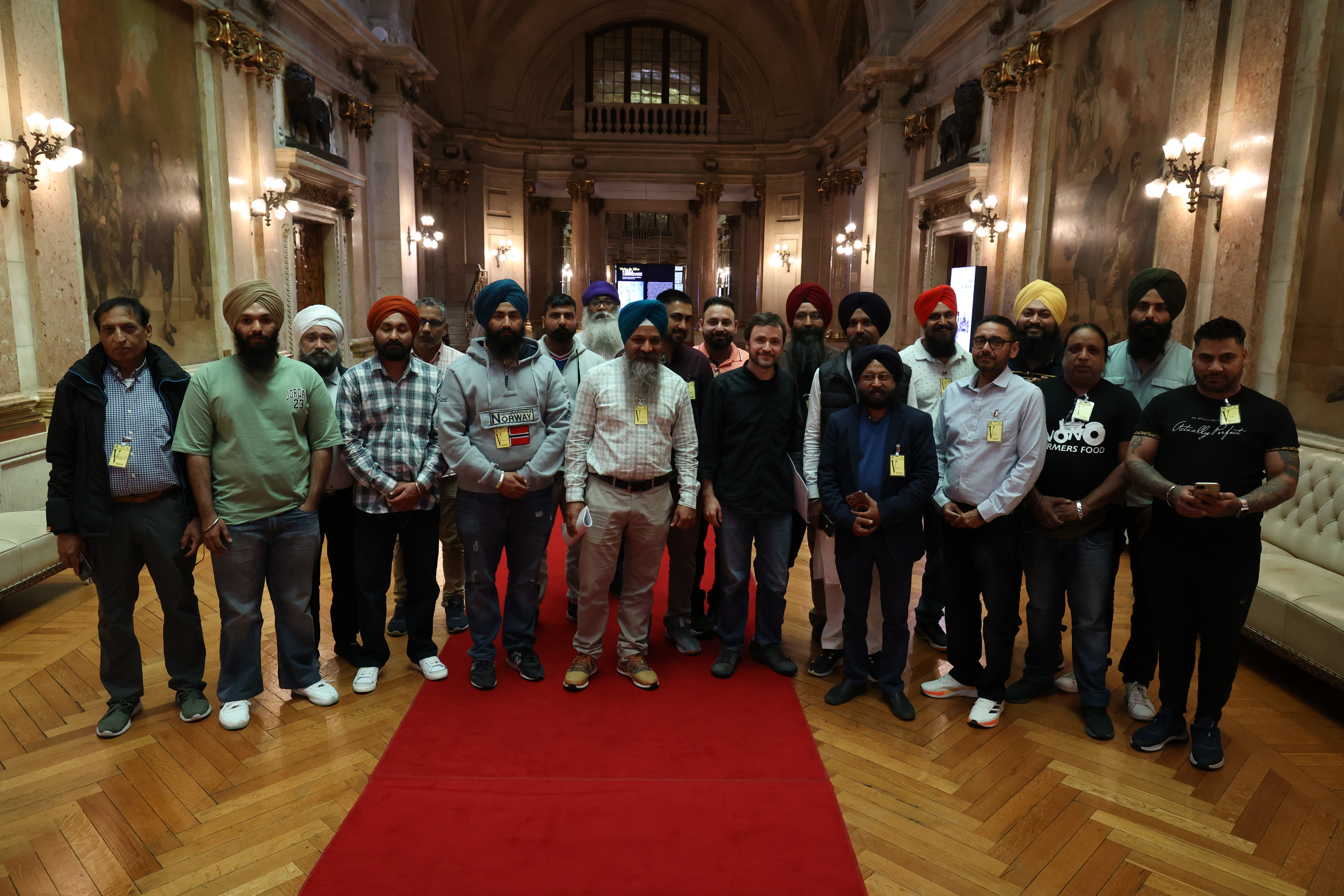
Meeting in Portuguese Parliament with the Sikh community in Lisbon (May 2024)

In 2008, Portuguese Police did not arrest a Sikh man for his kirpan despite the blade exceeded the legal limit because they recognised its religious significance.

In 2022, it was reported that 2,000 Sikhs took part in the annual Vaisakhi Nagar Kirtan parade in Porto.

== Demographics ==
- In 2007, it was estimated there were 5,000 Sikhs in Portugal.
- In 2010, it was estimated by Sikh religious leaders in Portugal that there were 10,000 Sikhs.
- In 2024, according to Indian Embassy in Portugal there are estimated to be 35,000 Sikhs living in Portugal.

== Gurdwara ==
There are 3 Gurdwaras in Portugal.

- Gurdwara Sikh Sangat Sahib in Lisbon
- Gurdwara Sri Guru Teg Bahadur in Albufeira
- Gurdwara Sri Guru Nanak Dev Ji in Porto

== See also ==
- Religion in Portugal
- Sikhism by country
- Indians in Portugal
- Sikhism in Greece
- Sikhism in Italy
- Sikhism in France
