= Fazal Deen =

(1898-1963) hawker, battery-operator and entrepreneur

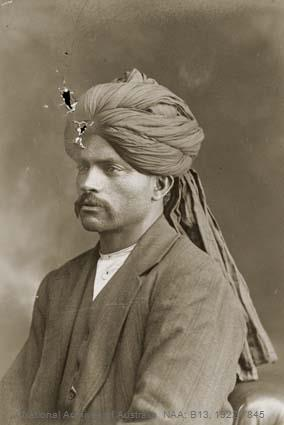
Fazal Deen in 1922

Fazal Deen (19 June 1898 - 29 December 1963) was a Pakistani-Australian man who came to Australia initially as a migrant from British India when a young man. He spent much of his life in the Northern Territory where he worked as a hawker, battery-operator and entrepreneur and, later, moved to Brisbane where he ran and invested in numerous businesses.

In the 1940s, while visiting India, he was caught up in violence following the Partition of India, in which his family lost much of their land and wealth. Following his return to Australia, he became a vocal advocate for Pakistan.

== Early life ==
Deen was born at in the village of Mehron in the Moga district of the Punjab in India to Foth Deen and Umri (Umrbebe) Bebe from a Rajput clan. His family were Muslim and this faith would be important to him throughout his life.

At 16 or 17 Deen married Burkit Bebe and the pair would have six children together; two daughters and four sons.

In 1922 Deen left his wife and their family to immigrate to Australia where he initially based himself Blackall, Queensland which is where his father was already living. Together he and his father worked as hawkers, travelling salesmen, who sold a variety of goods, including jewellery sourced from India, throughout Central Queensland. They sold their goods from a Bedford truck which had been fitted with external shelves and drawers to best display them.

== Life in the Northern Territory ==
In 1922 Deen and his father moved to Tennant Creek, in the Northern Territory, initially still as hawkers with their truck. However, soon after, Deen established a general store catering primarily to the gold miners who were flooding the region who he offered extended credit to often in return for a portion of their profits (this was referred to as 'grubstaking'). The following year, in 1923, he built a battery, known as 'Fasal Deens Battery' nearby to treat gold and, because of its success, was able to enlarge it over the following years. Between 1935 and 1936 the plant processed 54 kilograms (1,900 oz) of gold from 3,630 tonnes (8,000,000 lb) or ore for a total value of £13,375. At the battery Deen attracted criticism from the people working for him for paying a portion of their wages as credits only for goods at his store. Because of this the resignation rate at the battery was high.

In the 1930s, in addition to also getting involved in various mining ventures directly himself, Deen also leased a bore near to the battery and would charge passing drovers and pastoralists for watering their stock there. On the same land he also ran over 500 goats as well as smaller numbers of cattle and horses and used Halal butchering practices.

In 1936 four of Deens sons - Jagir, Wazir, Noor and Nasib (Tom), joined him in Tennant Creek and they lived together in a large house where Deen was known for entertaining and cooking for many guests. Jagir would return to India in 1938 and Wazir married Eunice, who was employed as the battery's bookkeeper.

Shortly after the onset of World War II, in around 1939, the battery was shut down and its engines removed for the war effort.

== Later life ==
In 1944, suffering ill health following being diagnosed with diabetes, Deen moved to Brisbane in Queensland where he bought and managed cafes.

In 1948 Deen made a return journey to India alongside Nasib (Tom) who was to get married there. Here, because of violence caused by the impacts of the Partition of India and because his presence as a Muslim man in a Hindu village, he was forced to hide in a cellar to remain safe. He hid there for a month before he was able to be taken to a refugee camp and, later, to Pakistan where many of his family, including his wife now were. Because of this conflict many of Deen's extended family lost much of their wealth, including ancestral land, although they did receive some monetary compensation.

In 1949 he was able to return to Australia, now with his wife, and they lived together in Wynnum. There Deen continued to operate various businesses and invest in property while also becoming a sought after interpreter for the government and an unofficial representative of Pakistan.

He died on 29 December 1963.
