= Sikhism in Fiji =

Total population
- 3,600

Regions with significant populations
- Lautoka • Suva • Tagi Tagi, Tavua District • Nasinu • Labasa

Languages
- Punjabi • Fijian • Fiji Hindi • Hindi • Urdu

Unlike the majority of Fiji's Indian population, who are descendants of Indian indentured labourers brought to Fiji between 1879 and 1916, most of the Sikhs came to Fiji as free immigrants. Most Sikhs established themselves as farmers. Sikhs also came to Fiji as policemen, teachers and preachers. In recent years large numbers of Sikhs have emigrated from Fiji, especially to the United States, Canada, the United Kingdom, Australia and New Zealand. Sikhs in Fiji are generally referred to as Punjabis. Total population of sikhs in Fiji is around 3600. Discourse on the experiences and histories of Fijian Sikhs tends to subsume them under discourse framed in terms of other South Asian groups.

== Arrival in Fiji ==
=== Under indenture system ===
Many Sikhs arrived in Fiji to work as sugarcane cutters.Sikhs were brought as indentured labourers between the years 1882–85 to work on sugarcane plantations.

Some people who stated their home province as being Punjab were recruited from other parts of India and boarded ships to Fiji from Calcutta. Between 1879 and 1900, out of the 21,368 emigrants from Calcutta, only 369 were from Punjab. Although no religious breakdown of these Punjabi migrants is available, because of the enterprising nature of the Sikh people a large proportion of these would have been Sikhs.

=== As free migrants ===
The period of free migration of Sikhs to Fiji lasted between the years 1904 to 1930. The first Sikh free migrants came to Fiji as part of the group of seventy Punjabis who were lured into coming to New Caledonia, in 1904, on the understanding that high wages were paid there. After finding working conditions unacceptable in the French colony, the seventy came to Fiji where some found temporary employment but most soon left for India dissatisfied at the low wages paid in Fiji. From 1905, when the Union Steam Ship Company of New Zealand began a regular service from Calcutta to Fiji, there was a regular flow of Sikhs and people from Punjab also known as the Saint Ravidass community to Fiji. Some came to Fiji to make it easier for them to enter North America, Australia, New Zealand and even Argentina.

The early Sikh and the Ravidass community migrants were mainly from the Jullundur and Hoshiapur districts, although some also came from Ludhiana, Amritsar, Ferozepore, Lahore, Ambala and Rohtak districts of Punjab. They were all young and mostly younger sons. They came with few women and those who stayed in Fiji married Hindu women and became prosperous farmers or went back to Punjab marrying within their caste and culture. These returned to Fiji with their wives and started families. Most of the emigrants maintained close ties with their families in the Punjab and remitted money back to them.

The first-choice destination for prospective Sikh immigrants in India were Canada, the United States, Australia, and New Zealand. However, when these countries started restricting the migration of South Asians coming in, then many Sikhs settled for their second-choice, which was Malaya and Fiji. The largest number of free Sikh arrivals to Fiji occurred between the years 1918 and 1930. The Sikh migrants arriving in the 1918–1930 period were from Doaba who began working as agriculturalists in Fiji.

Legal migration of Sikhs to Fiji continued until 1930, when higher restrictions were placed upon South Asian arrivals.

Many Fijian Sikhs are best described as "twice migrants", as after arriving in and residing in Fiji, many former immigrants to Fiji (or their descendants) have since emigrated to countries like Canada, the United States, and the United Kingdom (the first migration was from India to Fiji and the second from Fiji to Western countries).

=== As policemen ===
Contracted Sikh policemen began being posted in Fiji from 1900 onwards. Sikh policemen formed the bulk of the early Fijian Sikh community. From 1900 Sikh policemen were brought to Fiji from Hong Kong and Shanghai. C. F. Andrews and W. W. Pearson, in their report on Indian indentured labour in Fiji, in February 1916, expressed high regard for the Indian Police Force in Suva made up of Sikhs. They noted that unlike in India these policemen did not take bribes. They wrote that:

We found an extremely well-conducted Indian Police Force in Suva. These Indians, who were Sikhs, were paid a good monthly wage, and expressed themselves, on the whole, contented with their position. They had come out under an agreement, but there was nothing about it that was servile. Their passage was quite different from that of the ordinary coolies... They were treated well by their senior officers, who spoke highly of their men.

Walter Gill, who served as an overseer for the Colonial Sugar Refining Company in Lautoka during the final years of indenture, has also written about significant numbers of Sikhs employed in the Western Division of Fiji to police the Indian population.

== Sikh Gurdwara's and Shri Guru Ravidass Gurdwara in Fiji ==
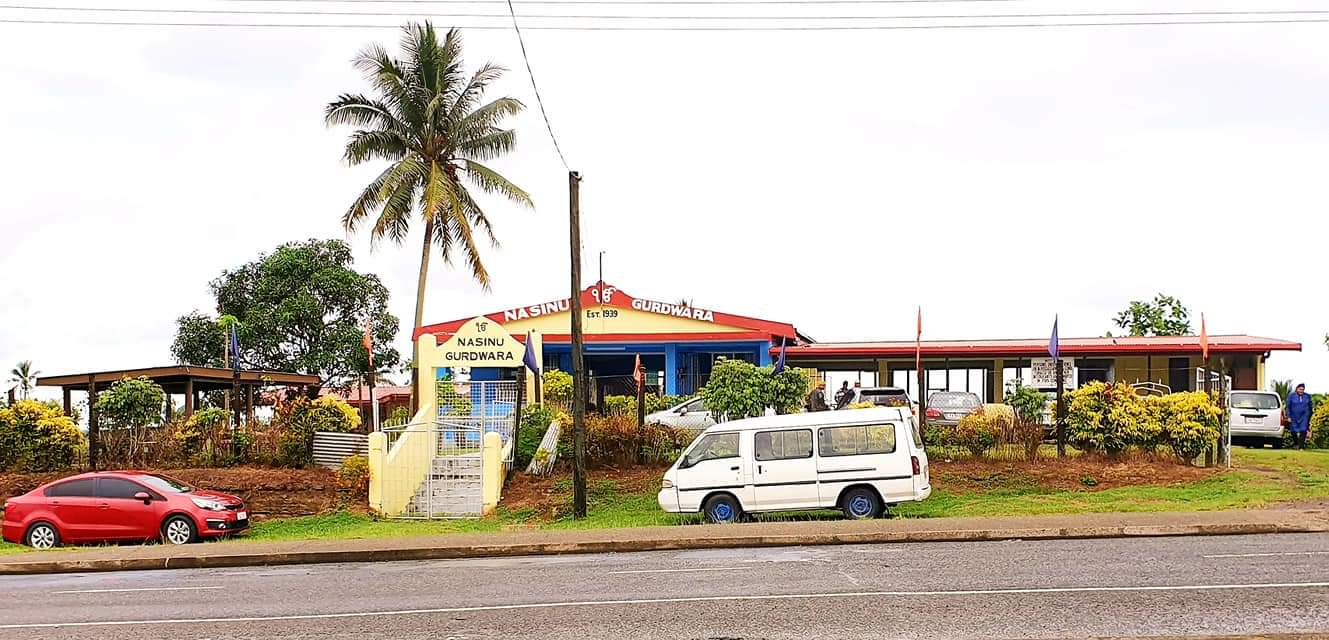
Gurdwara Guru Ravidass, Nasinu, Fiji Established in 1939

Name	City
Gurdwara Sahib Samabula	Suva
Lautoka Sikh Temple	Lautoka
Tagi Tagi Sikh Temple	Tagi Tagi, Tavua District, Fiji
Guru Ravidass Gurdwara	Nasinu, Suva
Labasa Gurdwara	Labasa

Sikh Gurdwaras have been established in areas of Fiji where there is a concentration of Sikhs. These temples not only serve as places of worship but also served the needy with food and shelter. The first Sikh temple in Fiji was built in Samabula (near Suva) in 1922 by Spuran Singh to provide for the needs of new Sikh migrants. Once Tamavua and Nasinu areas (near Suva) had a large concentration of Sikhs and in 1939 First Shri Guru Ravidass Gurudwara outside India was established in Nasinu 6 miles at the corner of Kings Road and Caqiri Road (Next to Singh's Caqiri Shopping Centre).The founding fathers of this Guru Ravidass Gurudwara, registered this Guru Ghar under the banner of the AD-Punjab Association which came from Punjab India in the early 1900s. Registered trustees are Mr. Lachhu Ram a.k.a. Lachhu Sheemar (f/n) Khema Ram, Mr. Rakha Ram (f/n)Phila Ram, Mr. Bakshi Ram (f/n) Melu Ram, Mr. Khushi Ram (f/n) Atchu Ram, Mr. Mehnga Ram (f/n) Nathu Ram. Most Sikhs from the settlements around Suva have emigrated to the United States and Canada and some have moved to the Western Division to undertake cane farming. There is a concentration of Sikh cane farmers in Mataniqara and Tagitagi which lie between Ba and Tavua and to cater for their needs, a temple was built in Tagitagi. There is another temple in Lautoka City, built to cater for the needs of the Sikhs in the Sabeto Valley, but many of these have either left for overseas or moved into the neighbouring settlement of Vutualevu. There is only one temple outside the main island of Viti Levu and it is located in the town of Labasa in the second largest island of Vanua Levu. All the temples in Fiji, except the one in Nasinu, are controlled by temple committees and funded by donations from the local Sikh community. The Ravidass Gurudwara also known as Nasinu Gurudwara is funded by the followers of the Ravidass community in Fiji and abroad.

== Sikh schools in Fiji ==
The first school built by Sikhs in Fiji was the Khalsa High School in Ba District, Fiji in 1958 to provide instruction in the Gurmukhi script of Punjabi to Sikh pupils. It is at present a multi-racial and co-educational institution open to students of all communities. In 1972, out of a total roll of 491 students, only 124 were Sikhs. The Guru Nanak Khalsa Primary School was also built at the same site in Ba. A small school, the Naduri Bay Khalsa Primary School, was built near Sigatoka to provide for the needs of the small Sikh community in the area. The Guru Nanak Khalsa Primary School opened in Labasa in 1970 with a roll of 47 students.

== Notables ==
- Bhai Gyan Singh Sangha was the first Sikh priest in Fiji. He was known for his work in religion. Singing the sacred hymns of Guru Granth Sahib and Sewa (helping people in need), he shared his knowledge and spread the words of Sikhism and Sikh Guru's philosophy to others. He and his wife Pritam Kaur Sangha were very devoted in the Sikh community. Many Sikhs after leaving India left their culture and religion behind. Thanks to this unique man and his devoted wife, Sikhs in Fiji still remember their faith and culture.
- Mehar Singh (a.k.a. Padri Mehar Singh) was the first president of the first effective cane farmers union in Fiji, the Kisan Sangh. He was the President from 1937 to 1944 when, due to disagreement with the Secretary of the union, Ayodhya Prasad, he left the union and formed a rival union known as the Vishal Sangh. His new union had a small support base (mainly Sikh) and had to align itself with the more powerful union, Maha Sangh, formed by A. D. Patel in 1941, for survival.
- Ujagar Singh was elected to the Legislative Council of Fiji in the 1968 by-election from the Nasinu Indian Communal Constituency, representing the National Federation Party (NFP). He was also a member of independent Fiji's House of Representatives. His strong support for the then leader of the NFP, Sidiq Koya, led to his political demise when the NFP split into two factions in 1977.
- Sarvan Singh was member of Parliament for the National Federation Party from 1972 to 1979. He was a supporter of Jai Ram Reddy for the leadership of the NFP.
- Kuar Battan Singh was member of the Senate of Fiji from 1970 to 1977. He was a businessman based in Nausori. During his younger days he was a soccer player and was a member of the 1955 Interdistrict soccer tournament winning Rewa team. He died in an air crash in July 1999.
- Pardeep Singh Rakkar was a Medical, Acupuncturist and a Herbalist practitioner in Ba, Fiji during the mid-1990s. He was a brilliant student from Khalsa College, Wailailai, Ba (1977 to 1981). Pardeep was born in Korovou, Tailevu, Fiji but lived at Mataniqara, Ba, Fiji. Pardeep was generous to many poor farmers of Ba district and provided free service to many of his former patients who were in need. In the late 1980s, Pardeep also taught at a high school in Lautoka. He now resides happily in Brisbane, Australia with his Khalsa College class mate and wife Sanita Devi Singh.
- Jogindar Singh Kanwal has been a long serving Principal of Khalsa College in Ba, Fiji. He is proficient in English, Hindi, Urdu and Punjabi. He has written a number of books in Hindi which include, Mera Desh Mere Log, Savera, Dharti Meri Mata and Karvatbut .His best known book is a survey of the development of Hindi in Fiji called A Hundred Years of Hindi in Fiji. He believed in the separation of the teaching of language from religion and with like minded people formed the Hindi Association of Fiji.
- Gurmit Singh was an educationist in Fiji who served as a high school principal, an Education Officer, a curriculum development officer, principal of a teachers college and a lecturer at the University of the South Pacific.
- Phuman Singh - Served in WW1, survived and lived in Suva, Fiji. He was appointed Justice of the Peace and prominent member of the Suva Gurdwara.
- Jiwan Singh served as a corporal in the Fiji Police Force during the 1940s, originally a member of the British Indian Army, hailing from Hoshiarpur, Punjab. He was awarded with the Defence Medal after WW2, from 1939-45. He was one of the last serving officers in Suva that wore a turban, garnering considerable public attention.

== Statistics ==
- According to the 1921 census, 449 of the 61,000 Indians were born in Punjab.
- According to Fiji Labour Department statistics, between 1927 and 1930, 1,508 male but only 18 female Punjabi immigrants came to Fiji.
- According to the 1956 census, 468 out of a total of 25,848 Fiji Indian households stated Punjabi as the main language spoken
- According to the 1966 census, only 3,002 of the 240,960 Fiji Indians were of the Sikh faith and there were 175 households where Gurmukhi was spoken.
- According to the 1996 census, 3,076 individuals listed their religion as being Sikh. This represents 0.9% of the Fiji Indian population.
- According to the 2007 census, 2,577 individuals listed their religion as being Sikh. This represents 0.86% of the Fiji Indian population.

== See also ==
- Gurdwaras in Oceania
- Sikhism in Australia
