= Sikhism in France =

Sikhism in France Le sikhisme en France
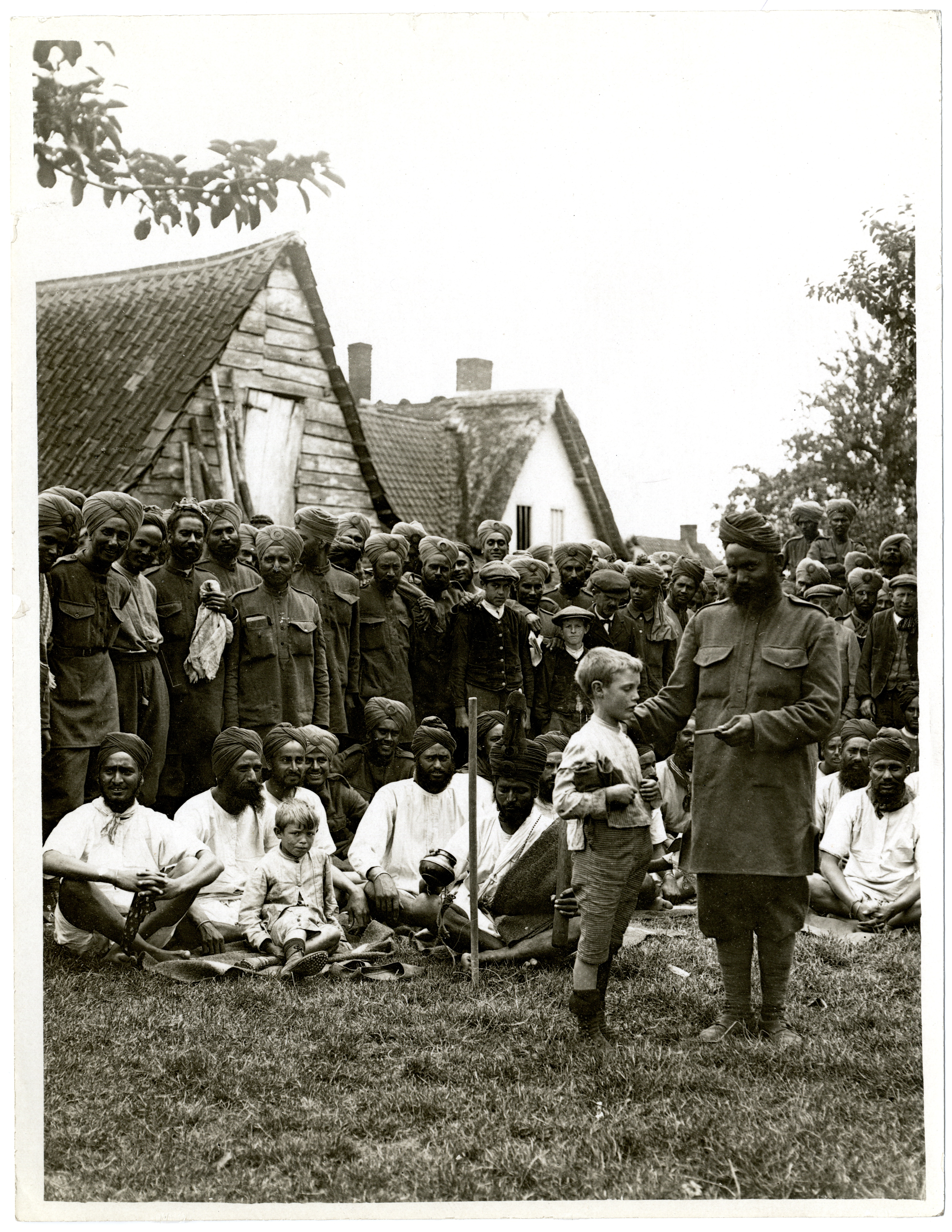
- During World War I, Sikhs soldiers and French villagers in Le Sart, France (24 July 1915)

Total population
- 30,000

Regions with significant populations
- Paris · Bobigny · Le Bourget

Religions
- Sikhism

Languages
- Punjabi · French

French Sikhs are a growing but minority group in France. It is estimated there are about 30,000 Sikhs, most of whom are based in Paris, Bobigny and Île-de-France.

== History ==
=== Sikh Empire ===
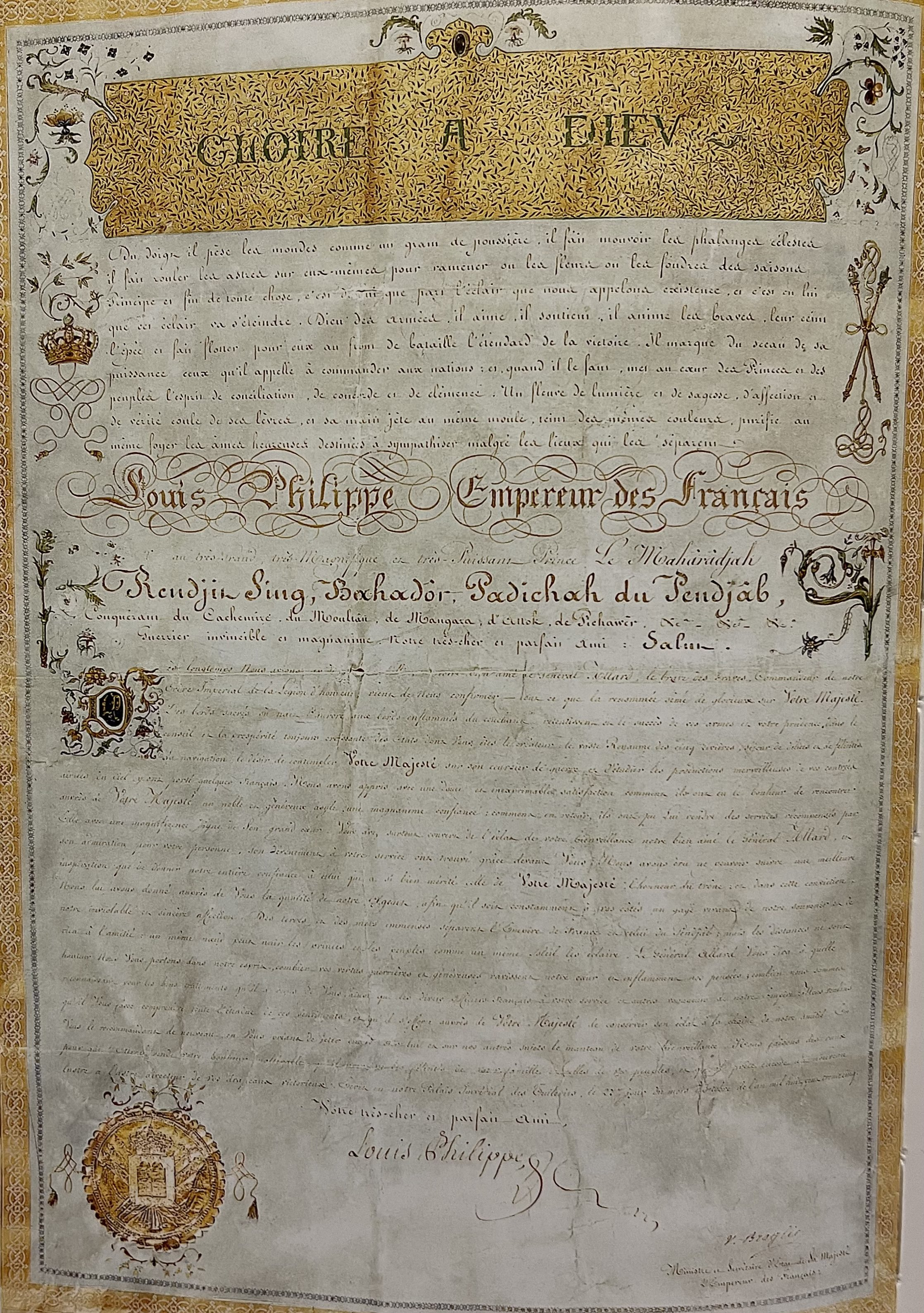
A letter sent from the King of the Frenchs, Louis-Philippe to Maharaja Ranjit Singh. Ranjit Singh is addressed as “Rendjit Sing Bahador - Padichah du Pendjab”. Dated 27 October, 1835

General Jean François Allard, a Frenchman served as the first foreign general under Maharaja Ranjit Singh, the last Sikh Maharaja of Punjab. General Allard issued commands in French but also learned Punjabi to communicate with his soldiers.

Saint-Tropez, a renowned coastal resort in France, is associated with this historical relationship. Within the town, a municipal park features a statue of Maharaja Ranjit Singh and General Allard. It was presented to the town by the Government of Punjab in 2016.

General Allard and Maharaja Ranjit Singh formed a close friendship, and Allard played a pivotal role in establishing the Fauj-i-Khas, a well-structured brigade inspired by Napoleon's army, which contributed to the Sikh triumph in the first Anglo-Sikh war. During battles against the Afghans at the Khyber Pass, the brigade's orders were conveyed in French, providing a tactical advantage.

The connection between Punjab and Saint-Tropez further encompasses the marriage of General Allard to Bannu Pan Deï, strategically arranged by Maharaja Ranjit Singh to strengthen Allard's ties with Punjab. Henri Prevost Allard, the great-grandson of General Allard and the deputy mayor of St Tropez, along with Ranjit Singh from the Sikh Council of France, had proposed the idea to celebrate this connection between the two communities.

=== Colonial Rule ===
The history of Sikhs in France dates back to the early 20th century. Sikhs first arrived in France during the colonial period when the country had overseas territories, particularly in Southeast Asia. Many Sikhs served as soldiers or laborers in the French colonies, including French Indochina (present-day Vietnam, Laos, and Cambodia).

=== World War I ===
After World War I, some Sikh soldiers who had fought in the French army chose to settle in France. They formed a small community, primarily centered around the cities of Marseille and Paris. These early Sikh immigrants faced numerous challenges, including language barriers and cultural differences. However, they established places of worship and gradually integrated into French society.

In the mid-20th century, a significant influx of Sikhs arrived in France as a result of political and economic factors. The partition of India in 1947 and the subsequent creation of Pakistan led to communal tensions and violence. Many Sikhs migrated to various countries, including France. Additionally, in the 1960s and 1970s, economic opportunities in France attracted Sikh immigrants, from Punjab in northern India.

== Demographics ==
- In 2004, according to The Guardian, there were estimated to be 8,000 Sikhs living in France with 5,000 of them living in Paris.
- In 2017, there were estimated to be 30,000 Sikhs in France.

== Turban ban ==
French Sikhs have been in the limelight since the 2004 turban ban, banning Sikhs and other religions from sporting a headwear. This has met with anger and worldwide protest by the Sikhs. At least five Sikhs wearing turbans or cloth covers for their uncut hair were barred from classrooms near Paris. For three years, Sikhs petitioned the authorities to lift the ban on the turban.

== List of French Sikhs ==
- Ranjit Singh Goraya – Deputy Mayor of Bobigny, first Sikh Deputy Mayor in France

== Gurdwaras ==
Gurdwaras in France include:

- Gurudwara Singh Sabha Culte Sikh France, Bobigny
- Gurdwara Sahib, Bourget
- Gurudwara Guru Teg Bahadur Sahib, Bondy
- Gurdwara Sant Baba Prem Singh Ji, La Courneuve
- Gurdwara Shri Guru Ravidass, Paris

== Sikh organisations and associations ==
- Singh Sabha Paris
- Conseil Representatif des Sikhs de France
- Sikhs de France
- Sikh Council France
- Sikhs Unis
- Punjab Sports Club
- Chardikala Sewak Jatha France
- Nawjawan Sikh France
- International Sikh Charity France
- International Sikh Council France

== Places with a significant Sikh population ==
- Paris
- Bobigny
- Seine-Saint-Denis
