= List of gurdwaras in the United Kingdom =

This list of gurdwaras in the United Kingdom shows the location of major gurdwaras (Sikh places of worship) in the United Kingdom.

== England ==
=== West Yorkshire ===
Name	Location	Notes	Image	Ref
Guru Nanak Gurdwara	Bradford			
Guru Gobind Singh Gurdwara	Bradford			
Gurdwara Singh Sabha	Bradford			
Ramgarhia Gurdwara	Bradford			
Gurdwara Amrit Parchar Dharmik Diwan	Bradford			
The Sikh Temple	Leeds			
Ramgarhia Board Gurdwara Leeds	Leeds			
Guru Nanak Nishkam Sewak Jatha	Leeds			
Sri Guru Nanak Sikh Temple	Leeds			
Gurdwara Guru Kalgidhar Sahib	Leeds			
Guru Nanak Gurdwara	Huddersfield			
Guru Tegh Bahadur Gurdwara	Huddersfield			
Gurdwara Singh Sabha	Huddersfield			

=== South Yorkshire ===
Name	Location	Notes	Image	Ref
Sri Guru Gobind Singh Ji Gurdwara	Sheffield			
Guru Kalgidhar Gurdwara	Doncaster			
Gurudwara Sri Guru Tegh Bahadur Sahib Ji	Doncaster			

=== East of England ===
Name	Location	Notes	Image	Ref
Guru Nanak Gurdwara	Luton			
Guru Nanak Gurdwara	Bedford			

=== South East England ===
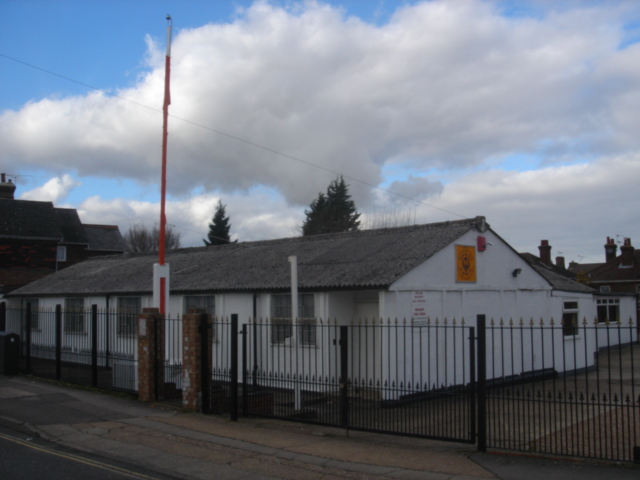
Siri Guru Singh Sabha Gurdwara, West Green, Crawley

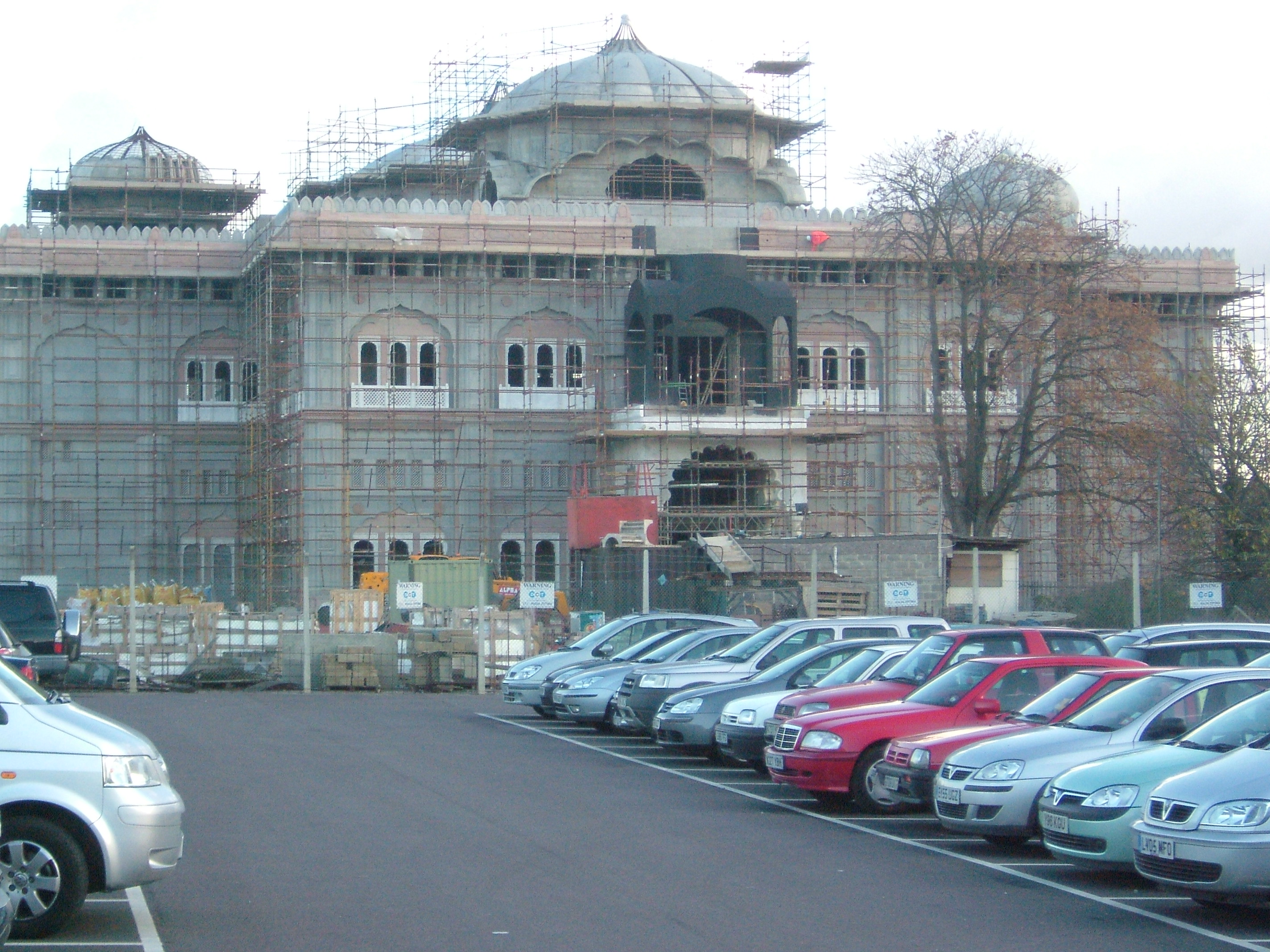
Shri Guru Nanak Darbar Gurdwara Kent under construction

Name	Location	Notes	Image	Ref
Guru Nanak Darbar Gurdwara	Gravesend			
Guru Ravidass Gurdwara	Gravesend			

=== South West England ===
Name	Location	Notes	Image	Ref
Shri Guru Nanak Prakash Singh Sabha	Bristol			
Gurudwara Khalsa Drbar	Southampton			

=== Greater London ===
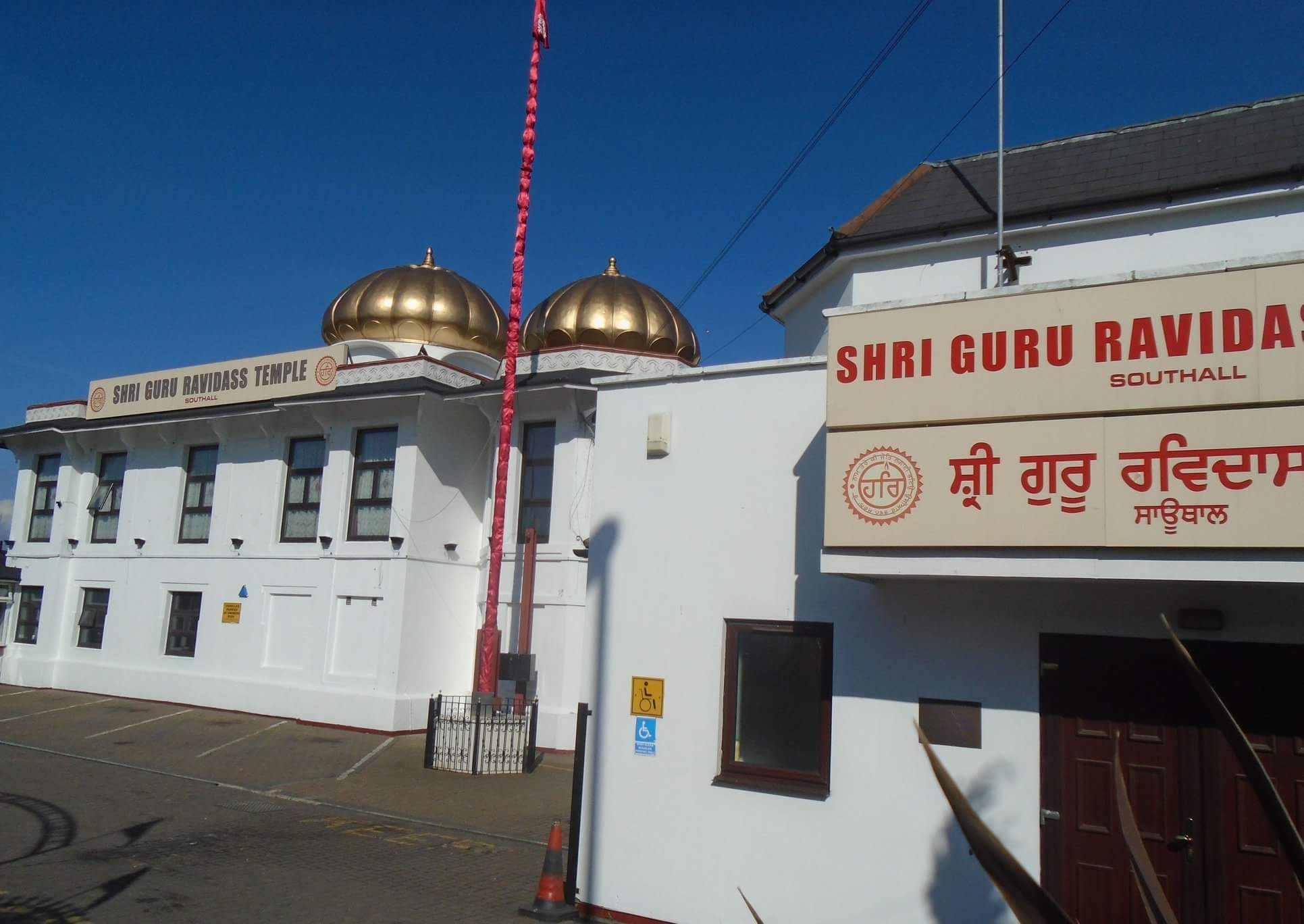
Gurdwara Guru Ravidass Sabha, Southall

Name	Location	Notes	Image	Ref
Central Gurdwara (Khalsa Jatha) London	Central London			
Gurdwara Sri Guru Singh Sabha	Havelock Road, Southall			
Gurdwara Sahib Woolwich	Woolwich			

=== West Midlands ===
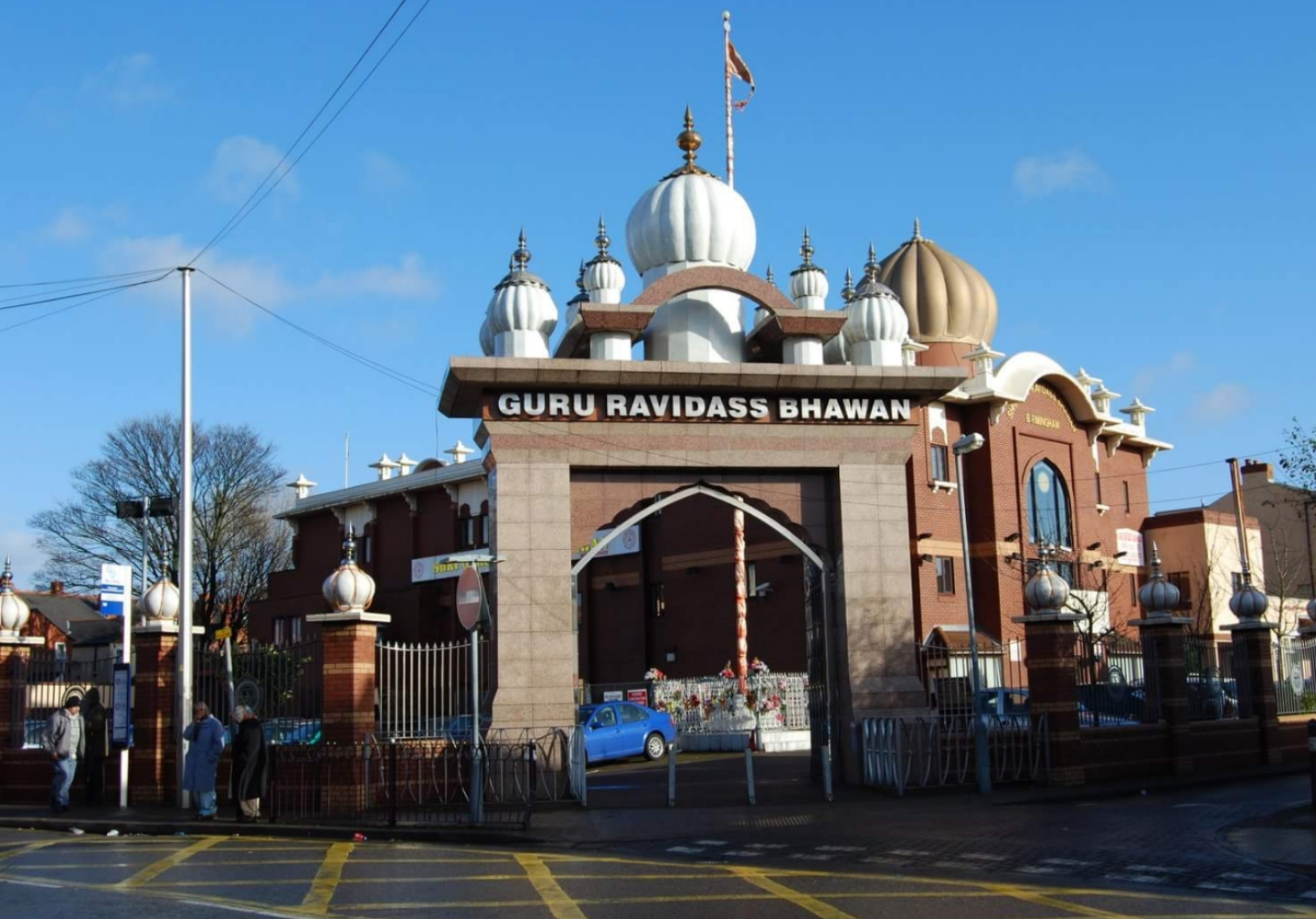
Gurdwara Guru Ravidass Bhavan, Birmingham

Name	Location	Notes	Image	Ref
Guru Nanak Nishkam Sewak Jatha	Birmingham			
Gurudwara Guru Nanak Prakash	Birmingham			
Shri Guru Ravidass Temple	Foleshill, Coventry			
Guru Nanak Gurdwara	Rugby, Warwickshire			
Gurdwara Nanaksar	Smethwick	Old Methodist Church		
Gurdwara Sahib Leamington and Warwick	Warwick	Third largest in UK		

== See also ==
- List of gurdwaras worldwide
