= Sikhism in Northern Ireland =

Sikhism is one of the smallest religions in Northern Ireland with over 389 Sikhs in the country, making up 0.22% of the population.

There have been Sikhs in Northern Ireland since the late 1920s – many of them former members of the British Army.

There are 2 gurdwaras: one in Derry and one in Belfast.

There are reports of Sikhs feeling culturally isolated in Northern Ireland. The exemptions for turban-wearing Sikhs to not wear a helmet in certain workplaces, which had applied to Great Britain for 20 years, when it would otherwise be required, were extended to Northern Ireland.

== Demographics ==
Historical Population of Sikhs
Year	Pop.	±%
2001	219	—
2011	216	−1.4%
2021	389	+80.1%
Census data on the number of Sikhs in Northern Ireland began in 2001.

Sikhs in Northern Ireland
Year	Percent	Increase
2001	0.012%	-
2011	0.011%	-12.6%
2021	0.020%	+80.1%

== See also ==
- Sikhism in the Republic of Ireland
- Sikhism in the United Kingdom
  - Sikhism in England
  - Sikhism in Scotland
  - Sikhism in Wales
- Religion in Northern Ireland
