= Sikhism in Ireland =

Sikhism in Ireland may refer to:

- Sikhism in the Republic of Ireland
- Sikhism in Northern Ireland
