= Malkit Singh Tehang =

- Born: Tehang, Phillaur, Punjab
- Occupation: Former president of Guru Nanak Gurdwara Smethwick

Malkit Singh Tehang was president of the management committee of the Guru Nanak Gurdwara Smethwick, in Smethwick in the West Midlands of England.

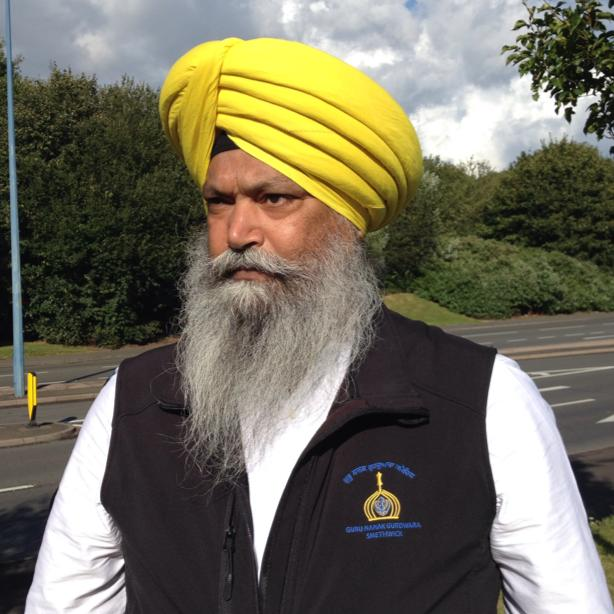
Malkit Singh Tehang outside Guru Nanak Gurdwara Smethwick

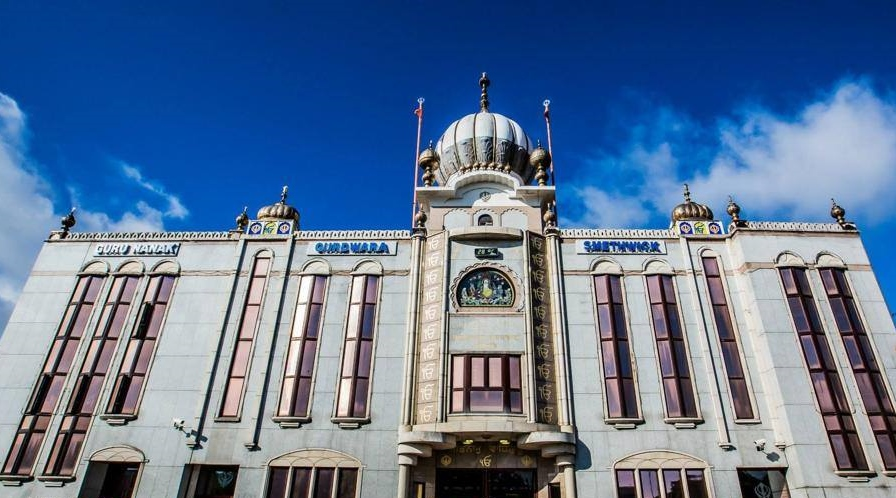
Front view of Guru Nanak Gurdwara Smethwick completed by the management committee of Malkit Singh Tehang

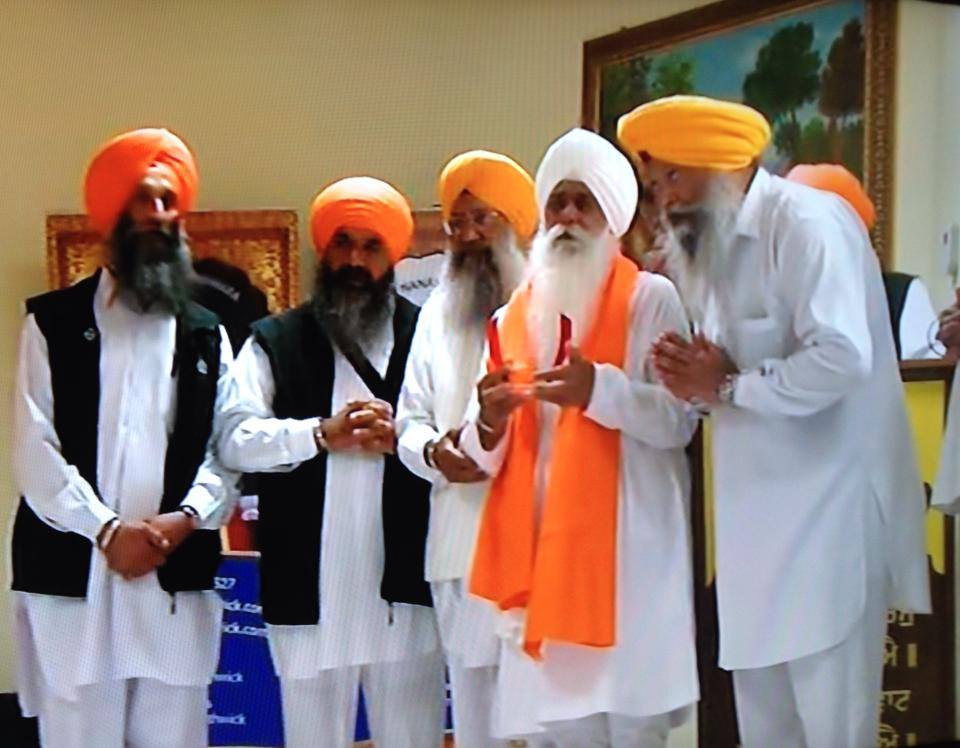
Bhai Sahib Bhai Mohinder Singh Ji of Guru Nanak Nishkam Sewak Jatha being honoured at Guru Nanak Gurdwara Smethwick for their services to the entire Sikh Nation by president Malkit Singh Tehang
