= Sikhism in the Republic of Ireland =

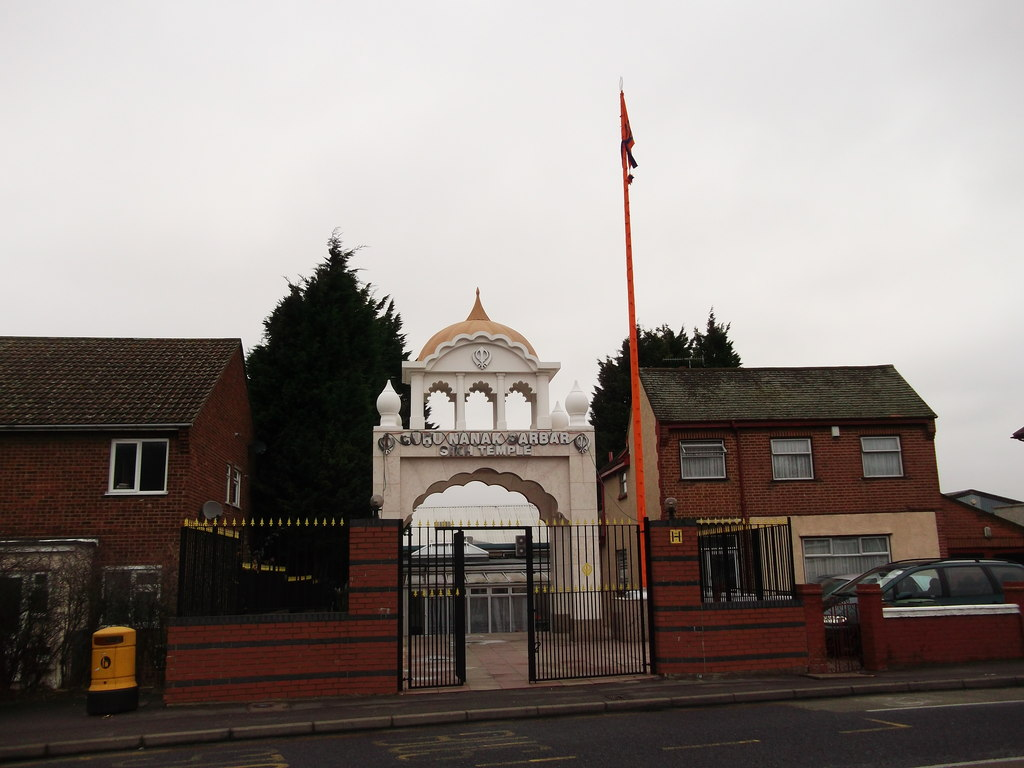
- Guru Nanak Darbar Gurdwara in Dublin

Total population
- 2,173

Religions
- Sikhism

Languages
- English • Irish • Punjabi

Sikhs in the Republic of Ireland are a religious minority in Republic of Ireland. There are 2,173 Sikhs living in Ireland per the 2022 census of Ireland.

== History ==
=== 19th century ===
Born in Limerick in 1841, Max Arthur Macauliffe was an Irish-Sikh convert and a scholar who devoted significant efforts in the late 1800s to translating Sikh scriptures and history into English, helping with the introduction of Sikhism to Europe and North America.

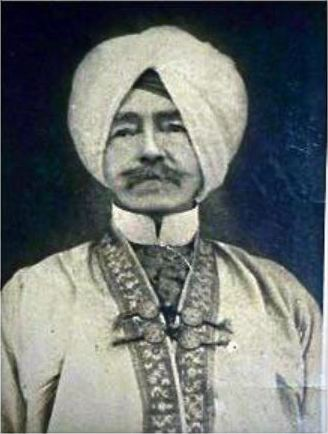
Photograph of Max Arthur Macauliffe wearing a turban.

=== 20th century ===
Sikh migration to Ireland largely began in the 1950s and 1960s, with Sikhs arriving primarily for work in sectors like manufacturing, transport, and agriculture. During this period, the community expanded into urban areas such as Dublin and Cork. Due to immigration policies in the 1990s and the Celtic Tiger period, Ireland attracted more Sikhs primarily from Punjab into professional jobs within the IT and healthcare sector.

=== 21st century ===
Sikh immigration in the early 2000s increased as a result of the coming of international students, some of whom stayed and had children in Ireland.

In 2019, over 2,000 people took part in the Nagar kirtan for Vaisakhi in the Sandymount area of Dublin. In 2021, Ravinder Singh Oberoi became the first practicing Sikh of the Garda Síochána Reserves.

== Gurdwara ==
- Guru Nanak Darbar Gurdwara (Ballsbridge, Dublin) - Established in 1987
- Singh Sabha Gurudwara in Cork
- Dashmesh darbar Gurudwara in Athlone

== Irish Sikh organisations ==
- Irish Sikh Council (founded 2004)
- EcoSikh Ireland

== List of notable Irish Sikhs ==
- Max Arthur Macauliffe, Sikh scholar
- Simi Singh, Irish cricketer

== See also ==
- Sikhism in the United Kingdom
- Religion in the Republic of Ireland
- Sikhism in England
- Sikhism in Wales
- Sikhism in Scotland
