= Dabinderjit Singh =

British civil servant and Sikh activist

Dabinderjit Singh "Sid" Sidhu OBE served as a director at UK's National Audit Office. He retired in 2022, having become the NAO's youngest director in 2000. He was appointed an Officer of the Order of the British Empire (OBE) in the 2000 Birthday Honours for his work on equal opportunities. He is also a leading Sikh activist and spokesman for the Sikh Federation (UK). Singh has become a regular commentator on behalf of the British Sikh community on the talkTV Faith Panel hosted by Trisha Goddard, is regularly quoted in the media and recently became a paper reviewer on Sky News.

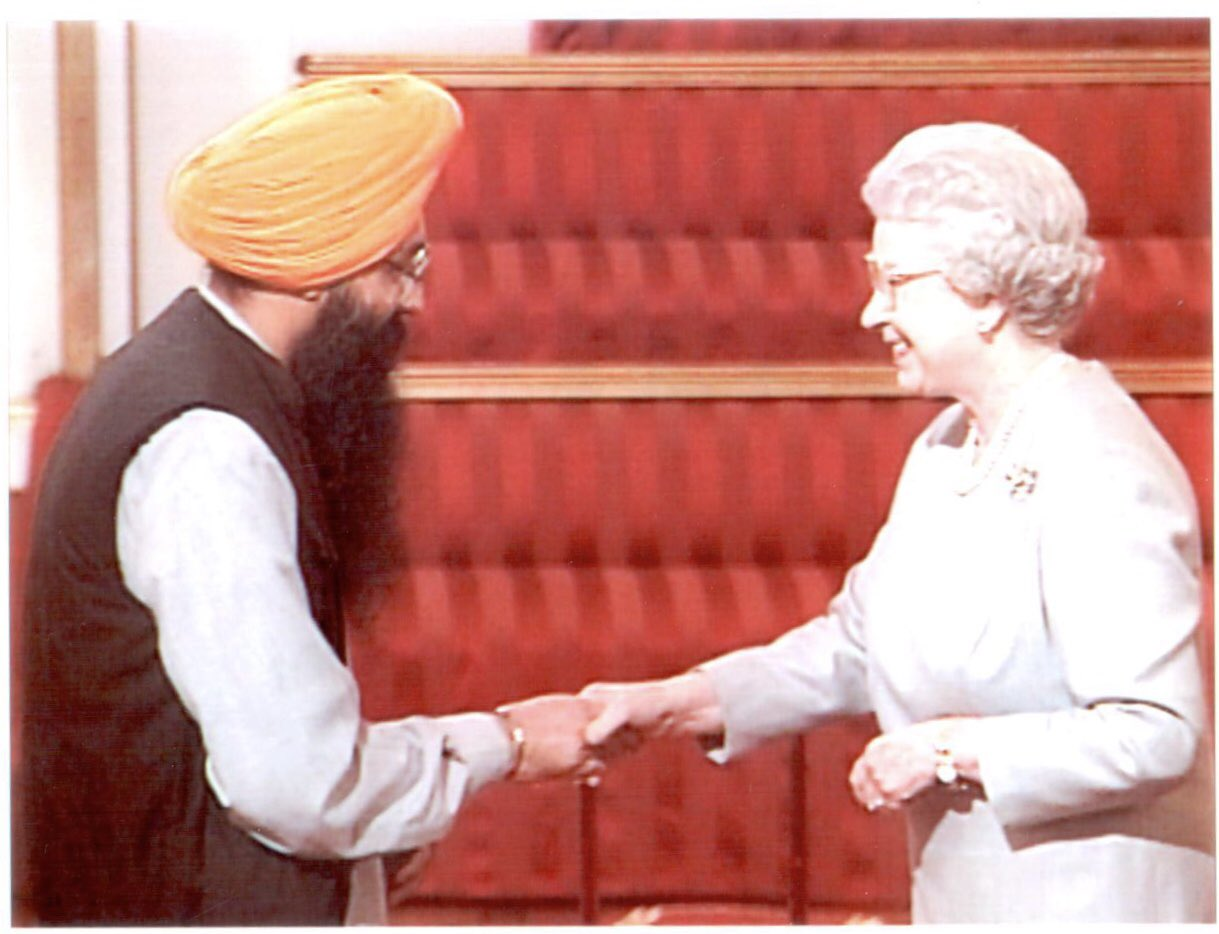
Singh receiving an Order of the British Empire from QueenElizabeth II in December 2000.

== National Audit Office ==
He was employed at the National Audit Office from 1 September 1988 until 6 May 2022.

In November 2000, the National Audit Office reported that Singh ("known as Sid Sidhu to his colleagues") had been promoted to Director. (NAO Focus Issue 9). Since 2000 NAO has published one further reference to Singh under the name Dabinderjit Singh. All other references have used "Sid Sidhu".

In March 2004 he was appointed the first Chair of the EU College of External Auditors for the European Defence Agency for three years and also served as the first Chair of the College of External Auditors examining EU-led military operations.

== Politics ==
Singh was approached in 2001 by the Metropolitan Police Service (MPS) and joined its first Independent Advisory Group (IAG) that was set up for visible minority ethnic and faith groups in advance of the report of the Macpherson Inquiry into the murder of Stephen Lawrence. He was appointed to the board of Transport for London in 2006, under former Mayor of London Ken Livingstone, and served until 2008.

Singh has acted as a spokesman for the Sikh Secretariat, formed in 2001, and has been the Principal Adviser of the Sikh Federation (UK) (SFUK), an organisation formed in September 2003 after the banning of the International Sikh Youth Federation (ISYF). The ban on the ISYF was lifted by the UK Government in March 2016. He is also a founding member of the Sikh Network set up in September 2014 that has become associated with the "Sikh Manifesto".

Singh, although never a member, was associated with the ISYF as he wore a jacket with a small ISYF emblem at his investiture at Buckingham Palace in December 2000 when he received his Order of the British Empire from Queen Elizabeth II. The ISYF was banned in the UK in March 2001, followed by India in December 2001 and Canada in July 2003. In the UK the organisation suspended its membership and national and local structures to legally challenge the proscription. In March 2016 following a legal challenge by three prominent Sikhs, including Singh, the UK Government lifted the ban on the ISYF in the UK and in April 2016 all restrictions were removed across the EU.

The Vancouver Sun, reported in February 2008 that Dabinderjit Singh was in Canada promoting a "Sikh agenda" for the Canadian Government. Dabinderjit Singh clarified he was not on a speaking tour, but on a family holiday to Canada and the US and spoke at one Gurdwara and one other small event where he encouraged Sikhs in Canada to engage in mainstream politics to bring about change. The alleged agenda included challenging the proscription of Sikh organisations in Canada.

Documents declassified by the UK Government in January 2014 under the 30-year rule and released to the National Archives revealed Margaret Thatcher authorised an SAS officer to visit India in February 1984 and assist the Indian authorities in planning the attack on the Golden Temple Complex. Singh and the Sikh Federation (UK) have led demands for a full public inquiry into British involvement. Singh was one of two witnesses who successfully argued in June 2018 in a three-day hearing of the First Tier Tribunal (Information Rights) that UK Government papers should be released in the public interest. Judge Murray Shanks in his ruling rejected the UK government's argument that declassifying the Downing Street papers would hurt diplomatic ties with India.

Singh was nominated for a life peerage by Keir Starmer in early November 2020. He was given the all clear by the House of Lords Appointments Commission on 3 December 2020, recommended by the Prime Minister Boris Johnson and the peerage approved by Queen Elizabeth II for a public announcement expected on 22 December 2020. His name was leaked and the Cabinet Office following a request by Keir Starmer's office in an unprecedented and controversial move withdrew his name from the public announcement over his support for Sikh independence.
