= The Sikh Court =

Alternative dispute resolution body for Sikhs in the United Kingdom

- Established: April 2024
- Jurisdiction: England and Wales
- Authorised by: Arbitration Act 1996
- Website: www.sikhcourt.co.uk

Chief Judge
- Currently: Baldip Singh

Chief Magistrate
- Currently: Gurbani Kaur

The Sikh Court is a legal organization set up in the United Kingdom in 2024 by a group of Sikh lawyers. It is intended to act as an alternative dispute resolution body for disputes within the British Sikh community.

In spite of its name, the founders have stated that it is not a religious tribunal, and participation in its processes is voluntary. The court has 46 members, who were sworn in during April 2024.

== History ==
In April 2024, the world's first Sikh court was established by Sikh lawyers in the 15th-century Old Hall at Lincoln's Inn, London. The court aims to provide an alternative forum for dispute resolution for UK-based Sikhs involved in family and civil disputes, operating on a mediation-arbitration framework in tandem with the UK courts to alleviate backlogs and offer culturally informed judgments.

== Key members ==
- Chief Judge - Baldip Singh Aulak
- Chief Magistrate - Gurbani Kaur
- Family Lead Judge - Sharan Kaur
- Civil Lead Judge - Satvinder Singh Juss
- Fact Finding Inquiries Lead Judge - Harjap Singh Bhangal

== Criticism ==
Pragna Patel of Southall Black Sisters, have criticised the creation of the court, saying that it is an example of a wider trend of conservative religious forces creating "parallel justice systems" occupying areas that were previously the concern of the secular state.

== See also ==
- Sikhism in the United Kingdom
