= Gurdwara Sahib Leamington and Warwick =

Gurdwara in Warwick, England

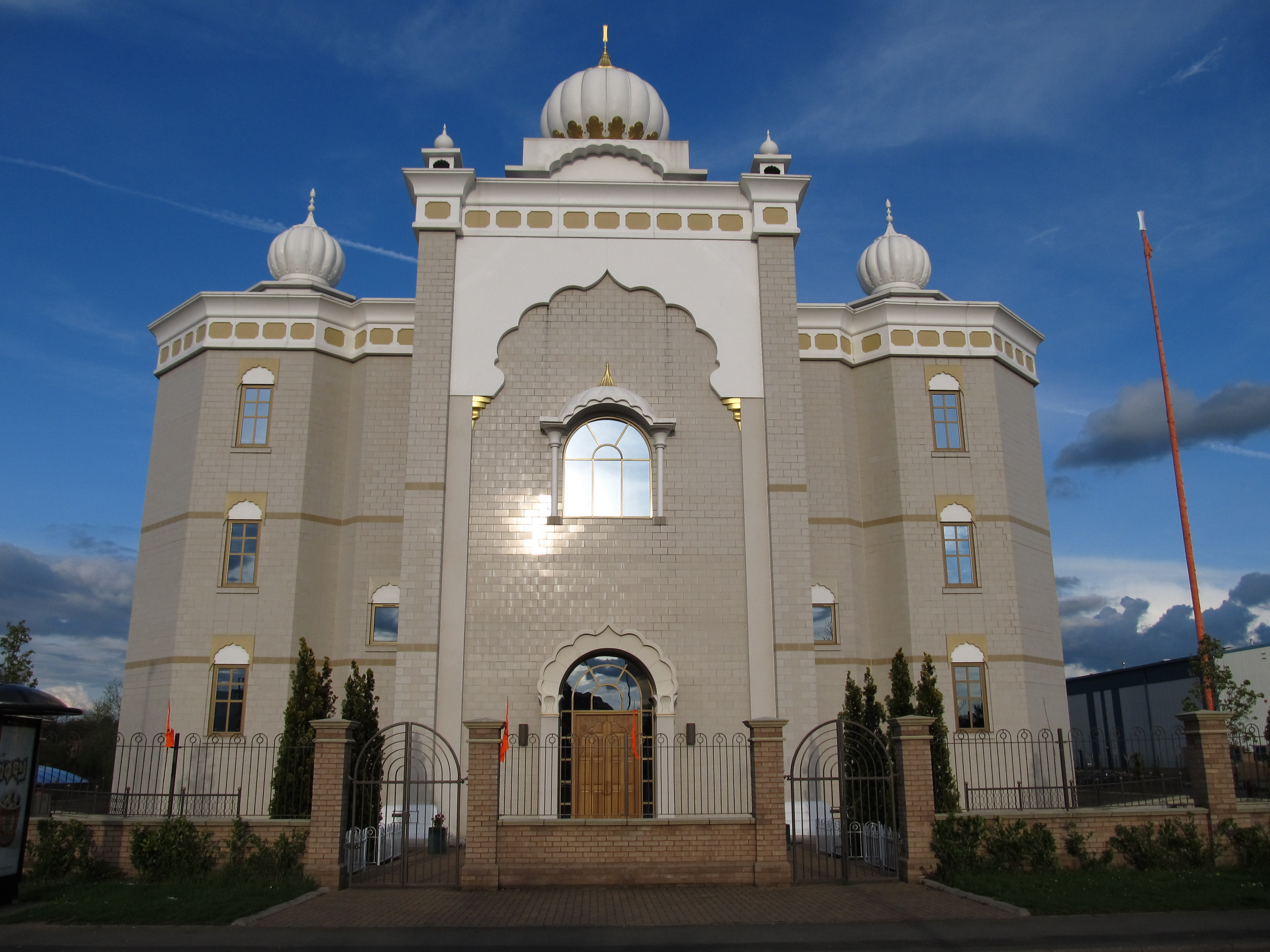
- The Gurdwara Sahib Leamington and Warwick in 2012
- Interactive map of the Gurdwara Sahib Leamington and Warwick area

General information
- Location: Tachbrook Drive, Warwick, England
- Coordinates: 52.2784°N 1.5450°W
- Construction started: March 2008
- Inaugurated: 25 October 2009
- Cost: £11 million

Technical details
- Floor area: 44,000 sq ft (4,100 m^{2})

The Gurdwara Sahib Leamington and Warwick is a Sikh gurdwara located on Tachbrook Drive, Warwick, England. It primarily serves the community around Leamington, Warwick and Kenilworth. It opened in 2009, and is the third largest purpose built Sikh gurdwara in the UK. It is therefore one of the most significant buildings associated with Sikhism in the United Kingdom.

== Details ==
It was built primarily to serve the 7,000 Sikhs living in the Leamington and Warwick area. The £11 million cost of construction was met entirely by the Sikh community. Construction began in March 2008 by the local building contractors AC Lloyd, with building works taking 18 months. It was formally opened on 25 October 2009. Its opening was celebrated by a precession through the streets of Leamington involving up to 7,000 worshippers.

It is a four storey building occupying 44,000 square feet (4,100 m^{2}). It contains three large prayer halls, a multi-purpose assembly room, a communal kitchen, and a number of offices and classrooms.

In February 2015, the gurdwara was visited by the then British Prime Minister David Cameron, in a bid to win support from the Sikh community in the run-up to the 2015 United Kingdom general election. Two months later it was also visited by Ed Miliband, the then leader of the opposition Labour Party.

== 2016 conflict ==
In 2013 the BBC reported that Sikh weddings were often disrupted by protesters opposed to mixed faith marriages in gurdwaras. In 2014 the General Assembly of Sikh Council UK, a Sikh organisation that coexists with the Sikh Federation (UK), which is said to be the largest UK Sikh organisation, passed guidelines declaring that temples are encouraged to ensure that both parties to an Anand Karaj wedding are Sikhs.

On 11 September 2016 a group of protesters initially reported to be "in possession of bladed items" disrupted a mixed-faith wedding between a Sikh bride and a Hindu groom at Leamington Spa gurdwara, threatening and intimidating the people inside. A trustee of the temple described the protesters as "fanatical extremists". Authorised Firearms Officers responded to the scene, arresting 55 men, and seizing "a significant number of bladed weapons", however all but one of which were kirpans, later determined to be ceremonial rather than functional.

Despite it being forbidden as per the Akal Takht, Gurdwara trustee Jaswat Videe said that the intruders were "absolutely wrong" to think that Sikhism prohibits interfaith marriage. The Sikh Council strongly opposes such mixed marriages.

During the Sikh wedding ceremony, Anand Karaj, a couple are making a commitment to live their lives as Sikhs. Many Gurdwara’s worldwide therefore do not allow non Sikhs to partake in the Anand Karaj, but a prayer service like Ardas can be undertaken instead. Similarly, some Christian churches like those of Catholic and other denominations do not allow non practicing Christians to have marriage ceremonies and this is no different with followers of Sikhi.
