= Guru Nanak Darbar Gurdwara =

Gurdwara in Gravesham, England

Gurdwara Nanak Darbar, Gravesend
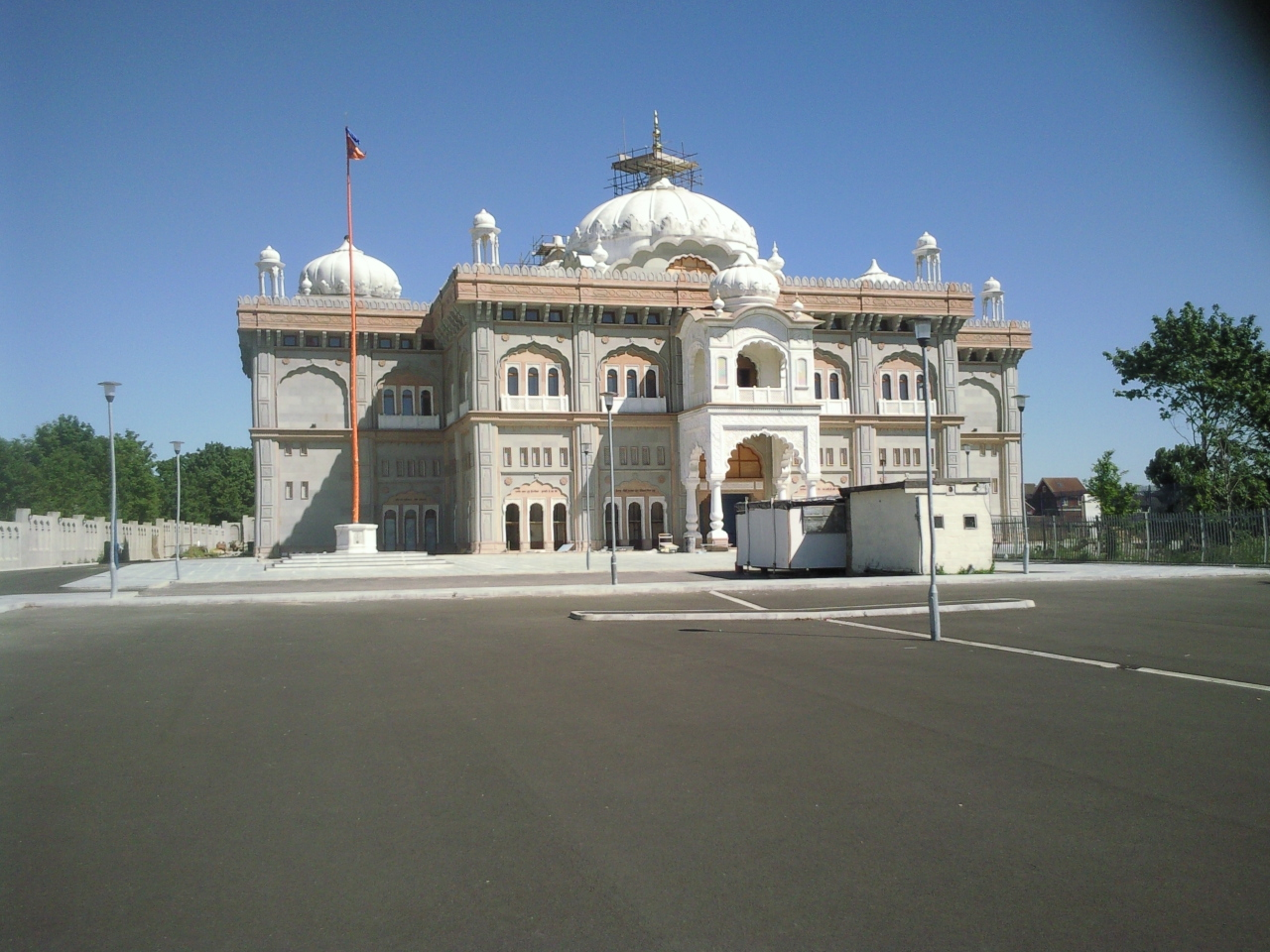
- Front entrance of Guru Nanak Darbar, Gravesend

Religion
- Affiliation: Sikhism
- Ecclesiastical or organizational status: Gurdwara

Location
- Location: Gravesend, Borough of Gravesham, England, United Kingdom
- Interactive map of Gurdwara Nanak Darbar, Gravesend
- Coordinates: 51.4392°N 0.3772°E

Architecture
- Architect: Teja Biring
- Type: Gurdwara
- Style: Sikh
- Completed: 2010
- Construction cost: £12 million
- Capacity: 10,000

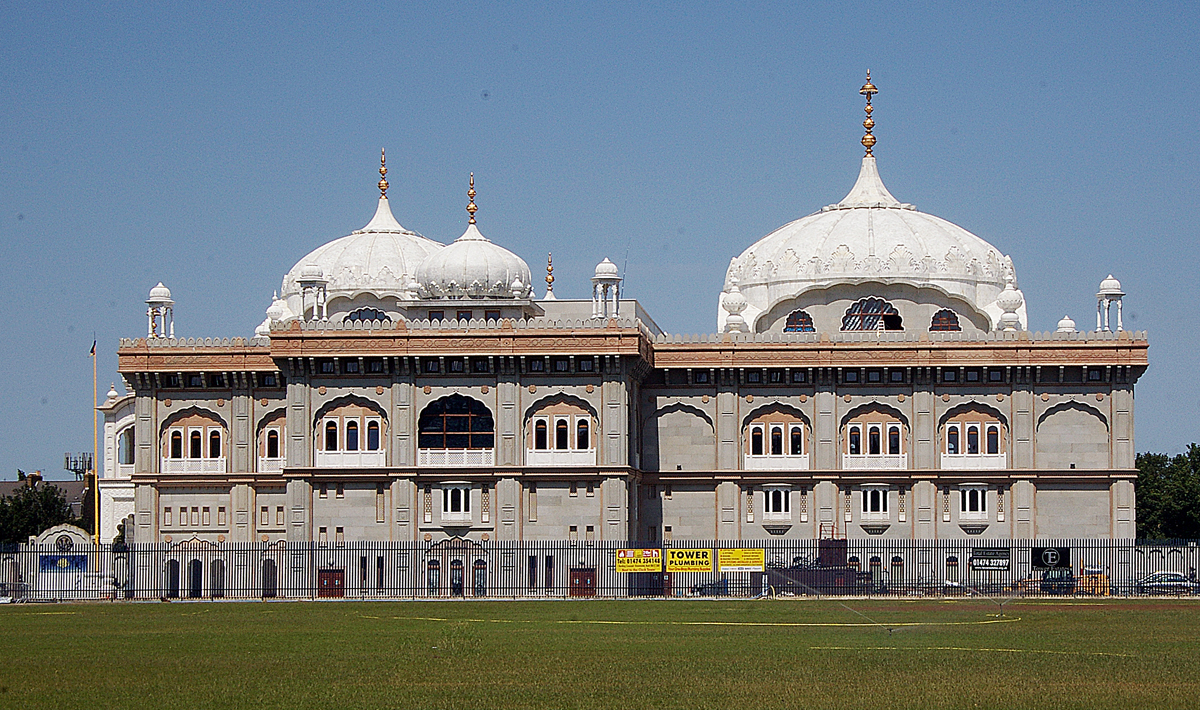
Image of Guru Nanak Darbar, Gravesend (from the side)

The Guru Nanak Darbar Gurdwara (Punjabi: ਗੁਰੂ ਨਾਨਕ ਦਰਬਾਰ ਗੁਰਦੁਆਰਾ (Gurmukhi)) is a Sikh Gurdwara situated in the town of Gravesend, Kent. It is the largest Gurdwara in Europe and also one of the largest outside India.

The complex has 3 prayer rooms and 2 langar halls. There is a building used for Punjabi lessons nearby, called Punjabi School, and as a day centre for the elderly community. There is also a sports hall hosting activities including boxing, basketball and karate. The grounds are used for outdoor sports including football and are where the Gravesend Guru Nanak Football Club plays. The architect was Teja Biring.

== Mukh Sevadar ==
The Mukh Sevadar is a title meaning the Chief Servant, and is commonly referred to as the President of the Gurdwara committee. They have authority of the worldly running of the Gravesend Gudrwara.

Elected	Mukh Sevadar	Party
7 September 2025	Inderpal Singh Sall	Baaj
17 September 2023	Ajaib Singh Cheema	Baaj
26 January 2020	Manpreet Singh Dhaliwal	Baaj
29 October 2017	Ajaib Singh Cheema	Baaj
12 October 2015	Shinde (A1) (aka Davinder Singh Bains)	Sher
October 2013	Shinde (A1) (aka Davinder Singh Bains)	Sher
2001	Jaspal Singh Dhesi	Baaj
	Gurdev Singh Rapur	
	Baldev Singh Biring	
c1976	Mohan Singh Mathada	
c1960s	Ram Singh Biring	
Pre 1962	Charan Singh Jandiali-wala	

Jaspal Singh Dhesi is the father of Slough MP Tan Dhesi.

Shinde (A1) is also father of Conservative Councillor Gurjit Kaur Bains who stood to be MP in Walsall in 2019, but was not elected. Shinde (A1) coordinated the 2015 visit of David and Samantha Cameron to the annual Vaisakhi celebrations amidst Tan Dhesi's 2015 Labour campaign, which Dhesi subsequently lost.

== Election History ==
=== Election 2025 ===
The 2025 election was held on 7 September 2025, with voting taking place between 9am and 7pm. Eligible voters were required to be on the electoral roll and register with the Gurdwara beforehand.

Candidate	Votes	Share	Party
Indepal Singh Sall	2,087	59.0%	Baaj
Bhai Sukhdev Singh	1,429	40.4%	Sher
Spoilt	19	0.6%	

=== Election 2023 ===
The 2023 election was held on 17 September 2023. Ajaib Singh Cheema from the Baaj faction was duly elected.

Candidate	Votes	Party
Ajaib Singh Cheema		Baaj
Bhai Sukhdev Singh		Sher

=== Election 2020 ===
The 2020 election was held on 26 January 2020, with voting taking place between 10am and 8pm. Manpreet Singh Dhaliwal from the Baaj faction was duly elected.

Candidate	Votes	Share	Party
Manpreet Singh Dhaliwal	1,584	54%	Baaj
Shinde (A1) (aka Davinder Singh Bains)	1,140	38.9%	Sher
Parminder Singh Mand	209	7.1%	Independent

=== Election 2017 ===
The 2017 election was held on 17 October 2017. Ajaib Singh Cheema from the Baaj faction was duly elected.

Candidate	Votes	Share	Party
Ajaib Singh Cheema	1,817	55.4%	Baaj
Shinde (A1) (aka Davinder Singh Bains)	1,444	44.0%	Sher
Spoilt Ballots	18	0.5%	

=== Election 2015 ===
The 2015 election was held on 12 October 2015. Shinde (A1) (aka Davinder Singh Bains) from the Sher faction was duly elected.

Candidate	Votes	Share	Party
Shinde (A1) (aka Davinder Singh Bains)	1,896	57.7%	Sher
Parminder Singh Mand	1,369	41.2%	Baaj
Spoilt Ballots	23	0.1%	

=== Election 2013 ===
Candidate	Votes	Party
Shinde (A1) (aka Davinder Singh Bains)	~4,000	Sher
Ajit Singh Clare		Baaj

== Guru Nanak F.C. ==
Guru Nanak F.C., sometimes called GNG (Guru Nanak Gurdwara) FC was founded in 1965 by a group of Sikh students, and is named after Guru Nanak. This is not to be confused with GNG FC Leicester.

This football club has a female section, where 70 women and girls play. they first entered team(s) in the FA People's Cup in 2019. In addition to Sikh players, they have Muslims, Polish, English, Asian and black players. The women's football club was started up by Parm Gill and, in recognition, UEFA rewarded her in 2018, with a UEFA Grassroots gold award for her leadership qualities. This was presented by the UEFA President Aleksander Čeferin, at UEFA's headquarters in Switzerland.

== GNG Kabaddi Club ==
The GNG Kabaddi Club was started in 1964. In 1969 the first UK Kabaddi Tournament was held on Gravesend Gurdwara field.

== Guru Nanak Day Centre ==
Guru Nanak Day Centre was established for the elderly in 1993. Day centre alumni include the WW2 fighter pilot Squadron Leader Mohinder Singh Pujji.

== Ethos ==
In line with the Sikh principle of Sarbat da bhala, the Gurdwara served 60,000 free meals to hospital staff during the COVID-19 pandemic.

== Sites ==
The exact timeline is not fully clear, and conflicting accounts can be seen. However, in the early 50s the first Guru Granth Sahib seems to have been brought to Gravesend by Mr Darshan Singh Sangha, a family from near Amritsar.

=== Wakefield Street (1950s) ===
Prior to Edwin Street, the Gurdwara was located at Wakefield Street. This was also the personal residence of Charan Singh Jandialiwala, who was from the village of Jandiali.

=== Edwin Street (1956/57–1970) ===
The original site for the Gurdwara was 55 Edwin Street, Gravesend. The site was purchased for £575, a significant sum at the time. A library of 500 books was set up in the 60s, having been brought over from India by the then schoolteacher and librarian, Joginder Singh Mattu. The Edwin Street Gurdwara was not closed for the first 2 years of the Clarence Place site operation, but was eventually sold for £2,500.

=== Clarence Place Site (1968–2010) ===
From 17 November 1968 the Gurdwara was located at Clarence Place. Originally a chapel, this site was being used as a warehouse for the previous two decades, when purchased by the Sikh community. The site was purchased for £13,000, and assistance was given in organising by the then MP Albert Murray.

An alternative site had been considered in Lennox Road, but was opposed by the white residents on racial grounds.

After the current site was opened, a plan was made to demolish the Clarence Place site, however this will now only be a refurbishment.

=== Khalsa Avenue (2010–present) ===
It was the idea of President Gurdev Singh Rapur to purchase the current site, which was a park at the time. Initial work was begun by retiree day labourers living off of their state pensions, and working for free. They would also ask other day labourers to volunteer on weekends. The current site took nearly ten years to built.

== Security Incidents ==
In 1976, the then Gurdwara President, Mohan Singh, was attacked by the National Front and thrown through the plate glass window of Woolworth's in Gravesend town centre. Gravesend, being specifically targeted due to having the largest Sikh population in the UK, at that time. This led to further confrontations, and the eventual expulsion of the National Front.

In the 1970s, due to National Front defacement with Swastikas and slogans, then President Mohan Singh organised patrols of 5–6 people at night to watch the Gurdwara and prevent further graffiti.

In 1980, the National Front attempted to burn down the Gurdwara, then located at the Clarence Place site. Local Sikhs, as well as English individuals such as Andy Zeffer and Jill Anderson of the Anti-Nazi League, as well as future mayor Lady Murray, Anglo Indian Naina Sampson (who was born in Delhi and fluent in Punjabi), Miss Braby who began a local club to help Punjabi women learn English, and many others, assisted in working to protest National Front attacks.

In 1981 such attacks were ongoing.

In March 2021 a Swastika was spray painted onto the entrance to the Gurdwara. General Secretary Jagdev Singh Virdee invited "...whoever it was to come in and talk to us. They will be very welcome." No culprit came forward to talk.

On 11 July 2024, a 17-year-old male snuck into the Gurdwara after Sukhasan and attacked two women and several security guards. Initially attempting to hide in an empty prayer room, he was found and accosted by security during their lockup. After a short conversation in which security tried to de-escalate, he threatened to kill the security guards. He then attacked two women, biting one, and slashing several others with a stolen Kirpan and Teer. The motive is unclear, but police initially treated the incident as "religiously aggravated" and not "terrorism-related". The teen was sectioned under the Mental Health Act. In November 2024 he was presented at Westminster Magistrates Court and sentenced for affray, actual bodily harm and was given a hospital order.
