= Sikhism in the United Kingdom =

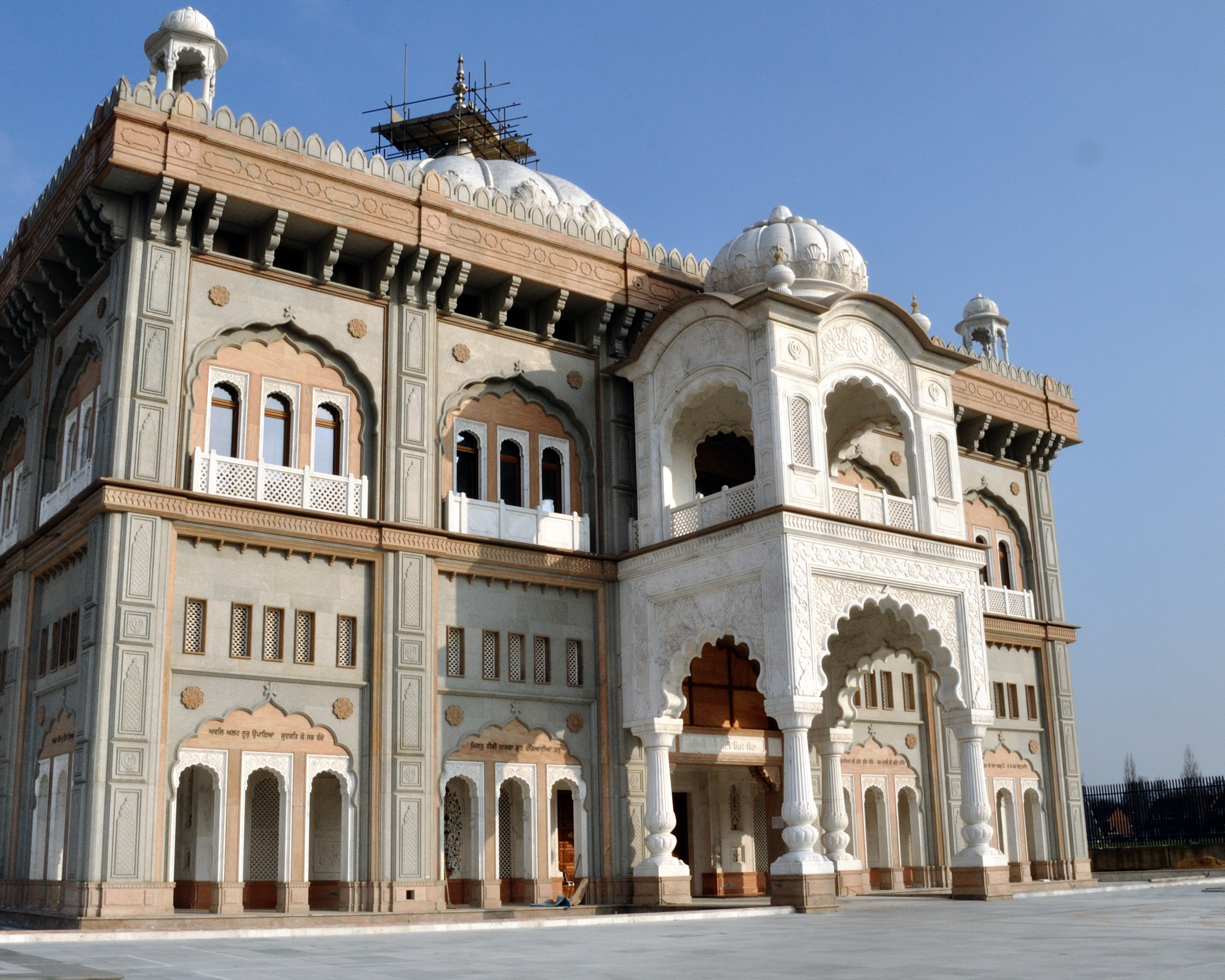
- Guru Nanak Darbar Gurdwara in Gravesend

Total population
- United Kingdom: 535,517 – 0.8% (2021); England: 520,092 – 0.9% (2021); Scotland: 10,988 – 0.2% (2022); Wales: 4,048 – 0.1% (2021); Northern Ireland: 389 – 0.02% (2021)

Regions with significant populations
- West Midlands: 172,398 – 2.90%
- London: 144,543 – 1.64%
- South East: 74,348 – 0.80%
- East Midlands: 53,950 – 1.11%
- East: 24,284 – 0.38%

Languages
- British English • Punjabi; Hindi • Urdu

Related ethnic groups
- American Sikhs; Australian Sikhs; Canadian Sikhs; New Zealander Sikhs

British Sikhs number over 535,000 people and account for 0.8% of the British population as of 2021, forming the United Kingdom's fourth-largest religious group. According to the 2021 United Kingdom census, British Sikhs numbered 535,517, with 520,092 in England, 10,988 in Scotland, 4,048 in Wales, and 389 in Northern Ireland. The largest Sikh populations in the United Kingdom are in the West Midlands and Greater London.

Sikh Population History in the United Kingdom
Year	Pop.	±%
1947	1,500	—
1951	7,000	+366.7%
1961	16,000	+128.6%
1971	72,000	+350.0%
1981	144,000	+100.0%
1991	206,000	+43.1%
2001	336,149	+63.2%
2011	432,429	+28.6%
2021	535,517	+23.8%
Religious Affiliation was not recorded in the census prior to 2001. Source: Office for National Statistics

== History ==
=== Sikh gurus and their associates ===
In 1708 during the final days of Guru Gobind Singh in Nanded, the Mughal emperor Bahadur Shah is said to have dispatched an English surgeon by the name of Dr Cole to dress the ailing guru's wounds. The Guru paid the English surgeon 10 gold coins per day for his services. The English surgeon attending the Guru is mentioned in an account of the passing of Guru Gobind Singh attributed to Koer Singh.

During the execution of Banda Singh Bahadur at Delhi in 1716, two Englishmen, named John Surman and Edward Stephenson of the East India Company, were witnesses. An account of the execution of Banda was written by the two men to Robert Hedges, dated to 10 March 1716.

=== Sikh Empire ===
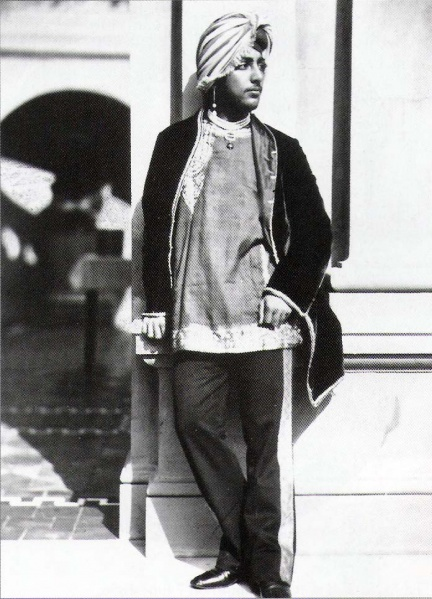
Duleep Singh, the last Maharaja of the Sikh Empire and the first Sikh in England, on the Lower Terrace of Osborne House on 28 August 1854.

Sikhs and Britain have a long and storied history. Decades before the last Sikh King, Duleep Singh, visited Britain in the middle of the 19th century, there had been Anglo-Sikh contact as far back as the 1800s in the Punjab with his father Maharaja Ranjit Singh. Since then, even though this relationship has changed in nature many times, both communities have left a strong permanent influence on each other. For instance, in such varied parts of British society as food, language, political systems, soldiering and of course cricket, the British-Sikh relationship has given rise to many new facets of modern British and Indian society.

=== Migration of Sikhs to Britain ===
The first Sikh to settle permanently in Britain was Maharaja Duleep Singh (1838–1893), the last Sikh Emperor of the Imperial Sukerchakia Dynasty, from 1844 to 1849. He arrived in England in the year 1854, having been exiled from his kingdom by the East India Company. His mother, Empress Jind Kaur (1817–1863), arrived in 1860 at Kensington in Victorian London and settled permanently, after being at war with Britain for an extended period of time until the fall of the Sikh Dynasty in 1849. She was given permission by Parliament to settle on English soil.

The first Sikh settlers started migrating from the Punjab in 1911, when the first Sikh Gurdwara was opened in London. During the start of the First and Second World Wars respectively, there was already an established Sikh presence in many parts of England. Britain's first south Asian immigrants after the war were Pakistani Muslims and Punjabi Sikhs from the Jullundur Doab. They tended to settle in midland towns such as Birmingham and Leeds, as well as in the London borough of Southall.

=== Present ===
In 2019, Seema Malhotra MP set up the first debate in Parliament to discuss the positive contribution of the Sikh community over the last 70 years.

Despite the existence of advocacy organisations like the British Sikh Report, there is very little systematic research on British Sikhs. The only major academic work that is a comprehensive, systematic, and thorough history of the community is by Gurharpal Singh and Darshan S. Tatla, Sikhs in Britain: The Making of a Community (Zed, 2006). This work needs updating in light of the impending Census 2021 to reflect changes in the community's profile.

== Demography ==
According to the 2021 United Kingdom census, Sikhs in England and Wales numbered 524,140, or 0.9% of the population.

=== Place of birth ===
According to the 2017 British Sikh Report which surveys the community in the UK, 71% were born in England, followed by 15% in India, 8% in East Africa, 2% in Scotland, and 1% in Afghanistan.

Birthplace of Sikhs in England and Wales (2001−2021)
Place of birth	2021		2011		2001	
Place of birth	Pop.	%	Pop.	%	Pop.	%
UK	300,075	57.25%	239,360	56.57%	184,612	56.05%
Non-UK	224,065	42.75%	183,798	43.43%	144,744	43.95%
Total	524,140	0.88%	423,158	0.75%	329,358	0.63%

=== Politics ===
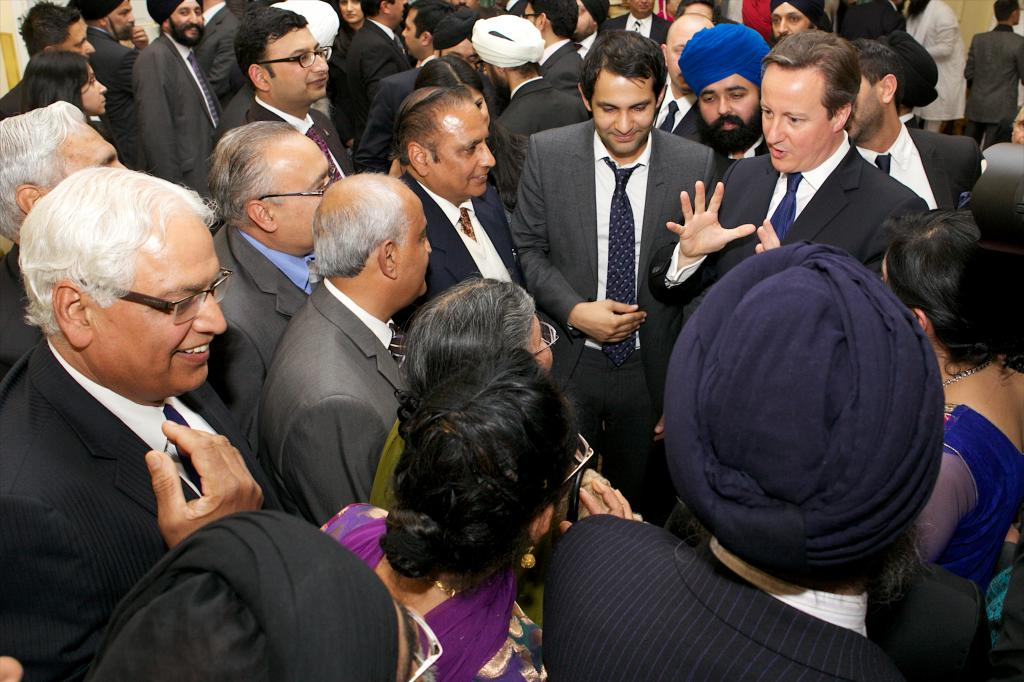
Sikhs meet with PM David Cameron

There have been sixteen Sikh MPs and eight Sikh peers in the UK's history. (Note: Sikh MPs: Piara Khabra, Marsha Singh, Parmjit Dhanda, Parmjit Singh Gill, Paul Uppal, Tan Dhesi, Preet Gill, Jas Athwal, Satvir Kaur, Harpreet Uppal, Warinder Juss, Gurinder Josan, Jeevun Sandher, Sonia Kumar, Kirith Entwistle and Baggy Shanker. Sikh peers: Tarsem King, Diljit Rana, Sandip Verma, Indarjit Singh, Ranbir Suri, Rami Ranger, Kuldip Sahota, Kulveer Ranger.) The first Sikh MP, Piara Singh Khabra, was elected in 1992 from Ealing Southall and the first Sikh peer was Tarsem King of West Bromwich, appointed in 1999. Currently, there are seven Sikh peers and eleven Sikh MPs; Sikhs make up 0.89% of the House of Lords and 1.69% of the House of Commons, while making up 0.8% of the British population.

The seven incumbent Sikh peers include four Conservatives (Baron Rana of Malone in Antrim, Baroness Verma of Leicester, Baron Suri of Ealing, and Baron Ranger of Mayfair), two crossbenchers (Baron Singh of Wimbledon and Baron Ranger of Northwood) and one Labour member (Baron Sahota of Telford).

A 2023 poll indicated that 43% of British Sikhs would vote for Labour, 20% Conservative and 4% each for the Liberal Democrats and Greens in the next general election.

Sikh MPs (2024 United Kingdom general election)
Party	MP	Constituency	Region	Sikh pop. share (%)	First elected	Notes
Labour	Jas Athwal	Ilford South	London	8.03%	2024	
Labour	Tan Dhesi	Slough	South East	11.36%	2017	
Labour	Kirith Entwistle	Bolton North East	North West	0.08%	2024	
Labour	Preet Gill	Birmingham Edgbaston	West Midlands	5.05%	2017	
Labour	Gurinder Josan	Smethwick	West Midlands	13.31%	2024	
Labour	Warinder Juss	Wolverhampton West	West Midlands	14.38%	2024	
Labour	Satvir Kaur	Southampton Test	South East	2.34%	2024	
Labour	Sonia Kumar	Dudley	West Midlands	2.11%	2024	
Labour	Jeevun Sandher	Loughborough	East Midlands	0.52%	2024	
Labour	Baggy Shanker	Derby South	East Midlands	5.43%	2024	
Labour	Harpreet Uppal	Huddersfield	Yorkshire and the Humber	2.04%	2024	

=== Education ===
65% percent of British Sikhs have a graduate level qualification or above. Sikhs in the 20–34 age group have the highest level of graduates (55%) within the Sikh community. The highest level of postgraduate qualifications of Master's degrees (22%) is in the 35–49 age group. Eight percent of Sikhs aged 65 and over have a PhD. The split of formal education between women and men is roughly equal, with slightly more women holding a university degree or equivalent (48% of women, 42% of men).

=== Employment ===
The most popular employment sectors for British Sikhs include: Healthcare (10%), IT and Technology (8%), Teaching and Education (9%), Accountancy and Financial Management (7%), indicating that Sikhs tend to favour professional and technical employment sectors over others. Healthcare is a popular sector for all age groups. Teaching and Education is more common in the 35–49 and the 50–64 age groups than others, whereas accountancy and financial management is more popular with the 20–34 age group (9%) compared with 6% respectively for both the 35–49 and the 50–64 age groups. The top career choices for Sikh women are Healthcare (14%) and Teaching and Education (15%). Healthcare is also a joint second most popular choice for Sikh men along with Accountancy and Financial Management, the most popular sector being IT and Technology (13%).

=== Integration ===
British Sikhs have been praised as an example of positive cultural integration in the United Kingdom, many having achieved success due to a strong cultural work ethic combined with an emphasis on the importance of the family.

=== Wealth ===
==== Home ownership ====
The 2021 census for England and Wales recorded 75.3% of Sikhs either owning their home with a mortgage (45.7%) or outright (29.6%). 18.9% rent privately or live rent free and the remaining 5.7% live in social housing. Across religious groups, Sikhs held the highest rates of home ownership (compared to 62.8% of the wider population) and were the least likely to live in social housing (compared to 17.1% of the wider population).

Home ownership is very high amongst British Sikhs with the British Sikh Report in 2014 recording 87% of households owning at least a portion of their home. 30% of British Sikh households own their homes outright and only 9% rent their properties. Only 1% of British Sikhs claim Housing Benefit. This represents the highest level of private home ownership rate over any other community in the UK. In addition, half of all British Sikh families (49%) own more than one property in the UK, with a similar number (50%) owning at least one property in India, apparently indicating that property ownership is used as a top means of building assets for the future. 6% of British Sikhs own property elsewhere in Europe.

==== Income ====
Relative to the national average income at approximately £40,000 before tax (according to the British Sikh Report), it found that Sikh households tend to be affluent. Two in every three British Sikh households (66%) have pre-tax incomes in excess of £40,000, and over a third (34%) have an income in excess of £80,000, giving a value for the Sikh Pound of 7.63 billion.

However, this data appears to be contradicted by research carried out by the Joseph Rowntree Foundation, which actually states Sikhs have the second highest poverty rate in the UK, with 27% of British Sikhs living below the poverty line; this is in comparison to 18% of the population as a whole.

About one in three British Sikh families (34%) own a business in the UK.

=== Charitable giving and volunteering ===
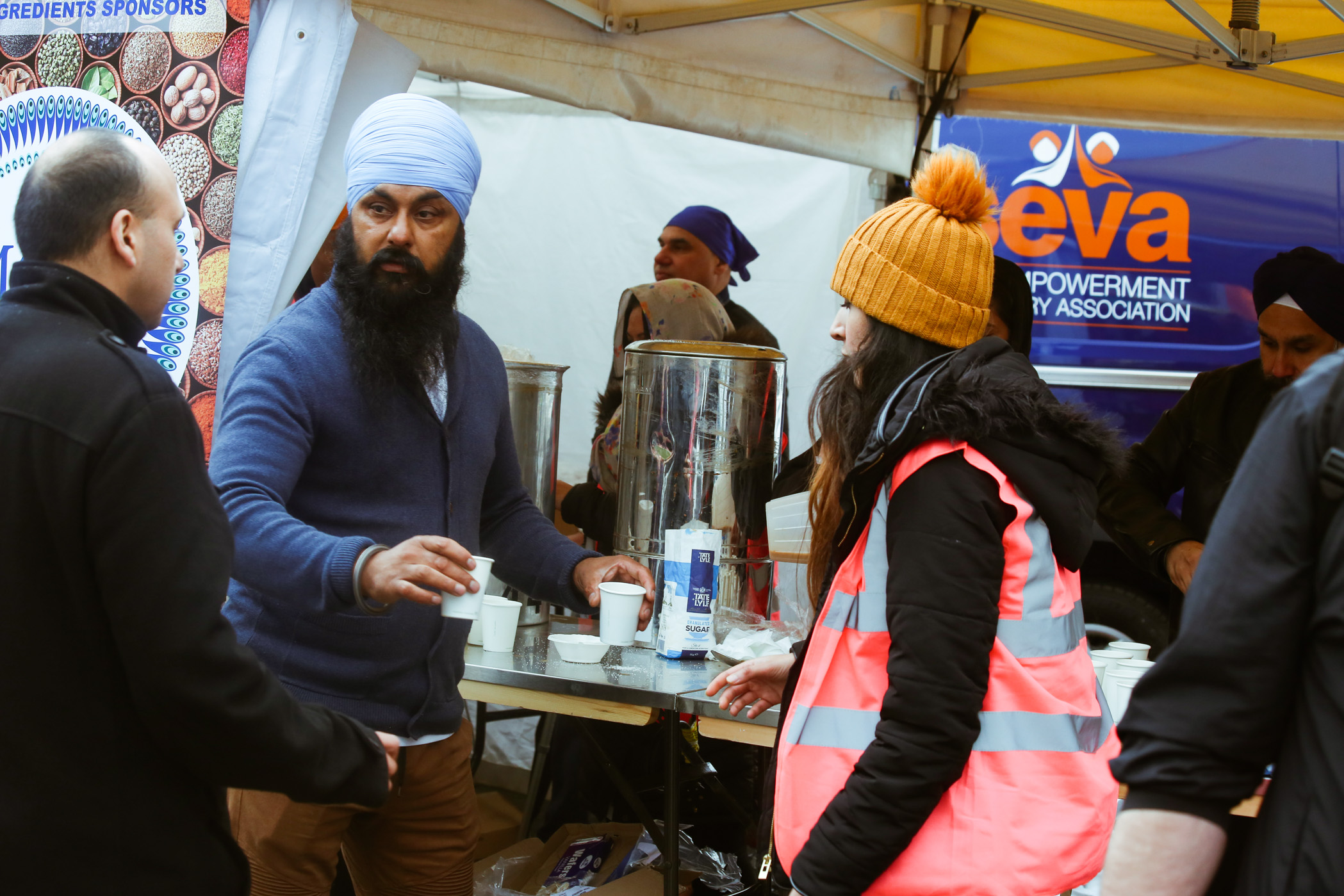
Sikhs distributing langar (free community kitchen) in London

Performing Seva (selfless service) is a basic tenet of Sikhism, and Sikhs are also expected to share at least 10 per cent of their earnings with those less fortunate and for good causes (Dasvandh).

64% percent of British Sikhs engage in some volunteering work, and 40% give between one and five hours per week on voluntary activities, including Seva at their Gurdwara, whilst more than 2% spend over 25 hours on such activities, spending an average of about 200 hours per year on voluntary activities. 93% percent claim to donate some money to charity every month, with 50% donating between £1 and £20 every month, and 7% donating more than £100 per month. It is estimated that Sikhs in Britain donate around £380 per year to charity on average. Taken as a whole, Sikhs in the UK are estimated to donate about £125 million to charity per annum and spend over 65 million hours each year on voluntary activities.

=== Care of the elderly ===
Sikhs prefer to live in extended family households as they grow older (61% of males and 52% of females). The second highest preference is in their own home (44% males and 41% females) and the third preference is in a retirement village (31% females and 24% males).

== Geographical distribution ==
Top ten English local authorities by Sikh population, 2021
Local authority	Population
Sandwell	39,252
Birmingham	33,126
Wolverhampton	31,769
Ealing	28,491
Hillingdon	26,339
Hounslow	24,677
Slough	17,985
Redbridge	17,622
Coventry	17,297
Walsall	17,148

Top ten English local authorities by Sikh proportion, 2021
Local authority	Percentage
Wolverhampton	12.0%
Sandwell	11.5%
Slough	11.3%
Hillingdon	8.6%
Hounslow	8.6%
Gravesham	8.0%
Ealing	7.8%
Oadby and Wigston	7.5%
Walsall	6.0%
Redbridge	5.7%

Sikhs in the United Kingdom by region and country
Region / Country	2021 (Note: 2021/22: England and Wales, Northern Ireland, and Scotland)		2011 (Note: 2011: England and Wales, Northern Ireland, and Scotland)		2001 (Note: 2001: England and Wales, Northern Ireland and Scotland)	
Region / Country	Number	%	Number	%	Number	%
England	520,092	0.92%	420,196	0.79%	327,343	0.63%
—West Midlands	172,398	2.9%	133,681	2.39%	103,870	1.97%
—Greater London	144,543	1.64%	126,134	1.54%	104,230	1.45%
—South East	74,348	0.8%	54,941	0.64%	37,735	0.47%
—East Midlands	53,950	1.11%	44,335	0.98%	33,551	0.8%
—East	24,284	0.38%	18,213	0.31%	13,365	0.25%
—Yorkshire and the Humber	24,034	0.44%	22,179	0.42%	18,711	0.38%
—North West	11,862	0.16%	8,857	0.13%	6,487	0.1%
—South West	7,465	0.13%	5,892	0.11%	4,614	0.09%
—North East	7,206	0.27%	5,964	0.23%	4,780	0.19%
Scotland	10,988 (Note: Scotland held its census a year later after the rest of the United Kingdom due to the COVID-19 pandemic. As a result, data shown is for 2022 as opposed to 2021.)	0.20%	9,055	0.17%	6,572	0.13%
Wales	4,048	0.13%	2,962	0.1%	2,015	0.07%
Northern Ireland	389	0.02%	216	0.01%	219	0.01%
United Kingdom	535,517	0.79%	432,429	0.68%	336,149	0.57%

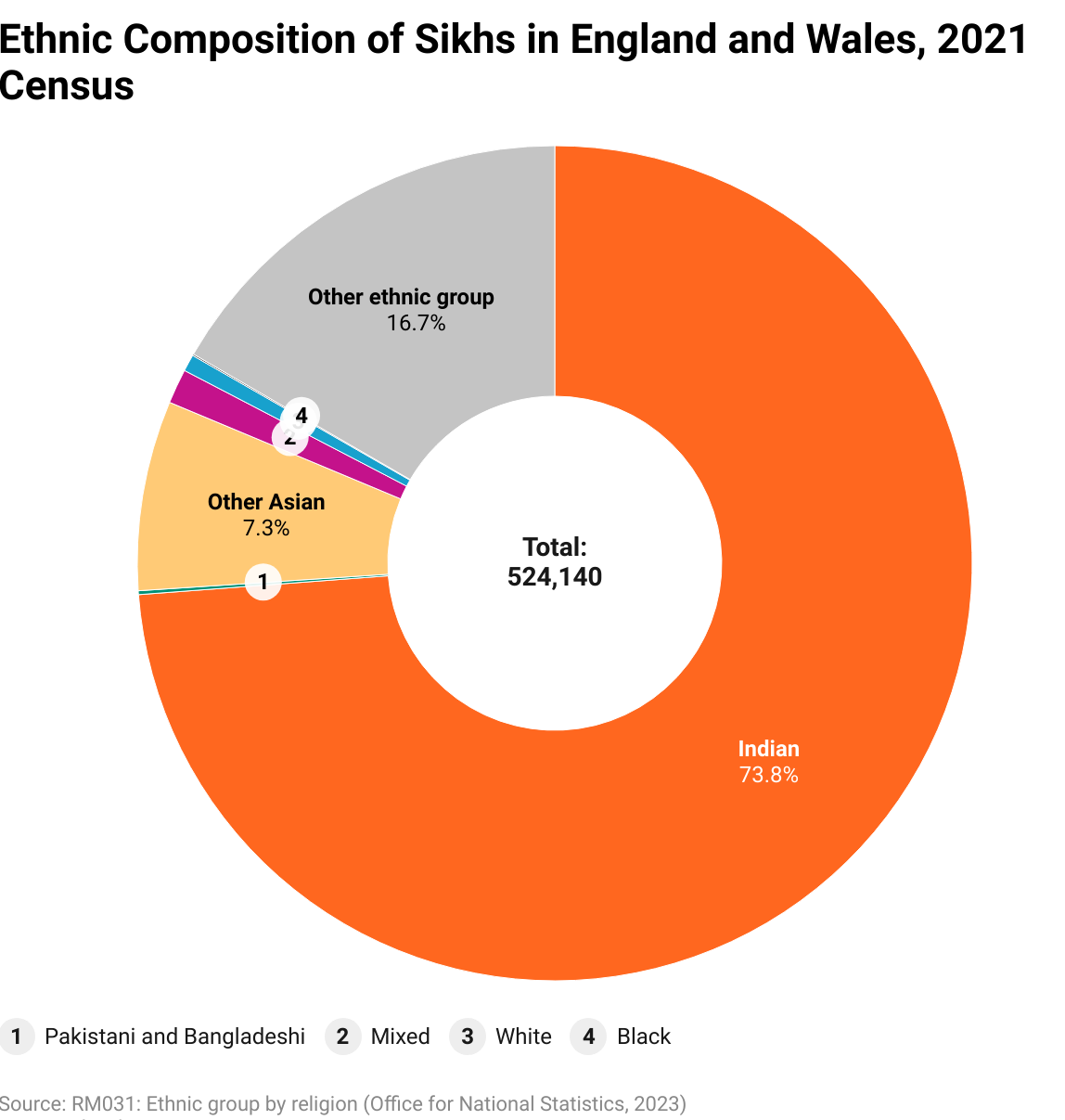
Ethnic composition of British Sikhs, 2021 census

According to the 2021 United Kingdom census, Sikhs in England and Wales enumerated 524,140, or 0.9% of the population Northern Ireland recorded a population of 389, or 0.02% of the population. The equivalent census was recorded a year later in Scotland with a population of 10,988, making up 0.2% of the population.

In the 2021 census for England and Wales, the main places of birth were the United Kingdom at 299,104 people (57.1% of the total Sikh population), South Asia at 192,485 (36.7%), South and Eastern Africa at 17,659 (3.4%) and other parts of Europe at 8,277 (1.6%). Among individual countries outside of the UK, the countries of: India, Kenya, Afghanistan, Italy, Uganda, Tanzania and Malaysia made up the most common countries of birth for Sikhs residing in England and Wales. 73.8% of Sikhs identified as Indian, 0.1% as either Pakistani or Bangladeshi, 7.3% were of other Asian heritage, 1.3% were of Mixed heritage, 0.7% as White, 0.1% identified as Black and the remaining 16.7% identified with other ethnic groups.

The largest ethnic group within the 'other ethnic group' category were Sikhs, with 76,535 using the write-in response option to declare they held Sikh ethnicity. A further 22,814 self-declared that Sikh was their ethnicity within the 'other Asian' category. 426,230 people in England and Wales identified as Sikh through the religion question alone, 1,725 through the ethnic group question alone and 97,910 through both questions together.

According to the 2017 British Sikh Report which surveys the community in the UK, 71% were born in England, followed by 15% in India, 8% in East Africa, 2% in Scotland, and 1% in Afghanistan.

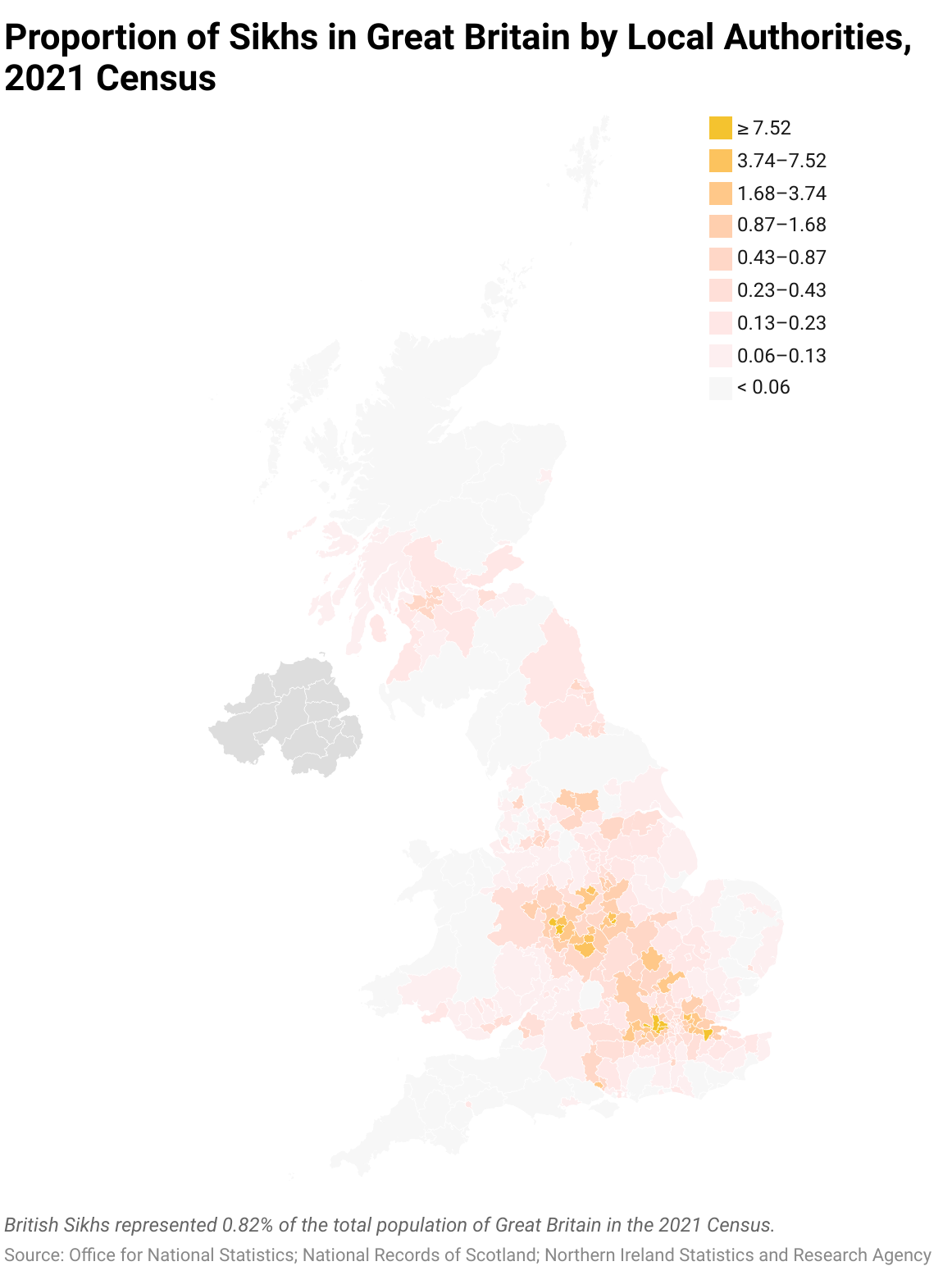
Distribution of British Sikhs by local authority, 2021 census

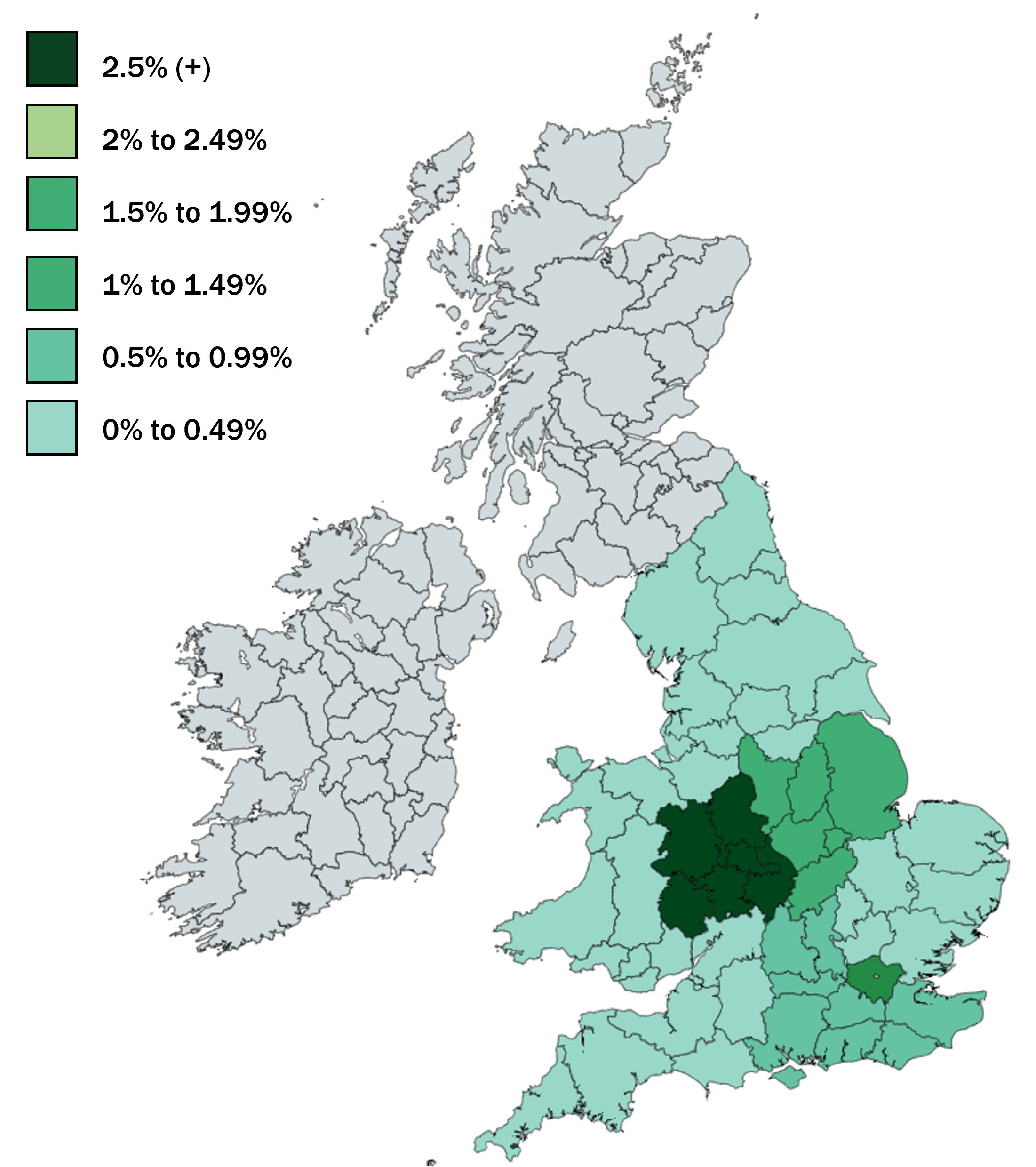
Sikh population distribution in the 2021 Census by UK Region.

=== West Midlands ===
West Midlands has the highest Sikh population and Sikh proportion of any English region, with 172,398 Sikhs making up 2.9% of the region's population at the 2021 census. The five West Midlands local authorities with the highest Sikh population are Sandwell (39,252), Birmingham (33,126), Wolverhampton (31,769), Coventry (17,297), and Walsall (17,148). The five West Midlands local authorities with the highest Sikh proportion are Wolverhampton (12.0%), Sandwell (11.5%), Walsall (6.0%), Coventry (5.0%), and Warwick (4.2%). The Black Country is home to 93,485 Sikhs and is 7.7% Sikh.

==== Sandwell ====
Sandwell has a large Sikh community numbering 39,252 at the 2021 census (the largest of any local authority in England) and making up 11.5% of the area's population (the second-largest proportion of any local authority in England). The majority live in West Bromwich and Smethwick. Sandwell's first gurdwara was built in Smethwick, and is the largest outside of London.

==== Birmingham ====
Birmingham has a large Sikh community numbering 33,126 at the 2021 census (the second-largest of any local authority in England) and making up 2.9% of the city's population. In 2021, Sikhs were the second-largest religious group in Handsworth, where they numbered 5,064 and made up 24.8% of the population.

==== Wolverhampton ====
Wolverhampton has a large Sikh community numbering 31,769 at the 2021 census (the third-largest of any local authority in England) and making up 12.0% of the city's population (the largest proportion of any local authority in England). Blakenhall, in Wolverhampton, was home to 5,131 Sikhs in 2021 and had a 40.7% Sikh plurality.

=== London ===
With 144,543 Sikhs living in London at the 2021 census (1.6% of London's population), the area is home to the second-largest Sikh community in the UK. The five London boroughs with the highest Sikh population are Ealing (28,491), Hillingdon (26,339), Hounslow (24,677), Redbridge (17,622), and Newham (5,638). The five London boroughs with the highest Sikh proportion are Hillingdon (8.6%), Hounslow (8.6%), Ealing (7.8%), Redbridge (5.7%), and Bexley (2.1%).

==== Ealing ====
The area of Southall in Ealing, also known as "Little Punjab", was home to 20,843 Sikhs at the 2021 census and had a 28.2% Sikh plurality.

==== Hounslow ====
Heston, in Hounslow, was home to 10,692 Sikhs in 2021 and had a 25.8% Sikh plurality.

=== South East ===
With 74,348 Sikhs living in the South East at the 2021 census (0.8% of the region's population), the area is home to the third-largest Sikh community in the UK. The five South East local authorities with the highest Sikh population are Slough (17,985), Gravesham (8,560), Medway (4,363), Southampton (4,192), and Wokingham (2,992). The five South East local authorities with the highest Sikh proportion are Slough (11.3%), Gravesham (8.0%), Windsor and Maidenhead (2.9%), Spelthorne (2.5%), and Southampton (1.7%).

=== East Midlands ===
With 53,950 Sikhs living in the East Midlands at the 2021 census (1.1% of the region's population), the area is home to the fourth-largest Sikh community in the UK. The five East Midlands local authorities with the highest Sikh population are Leicester (16,451), Derby (9,762), Oadby and Wigston (4,342), Nottingham (4,110) and Blaby (2,927). The five East Midlands local authorities with the highest Sikh proportion are Oadby and Wigston (7.5%), Leicester (4.5%), Derby (3.7%), Blaby (2.8%) and South Derbyshire (2.1%).

== Festivals and community events ==
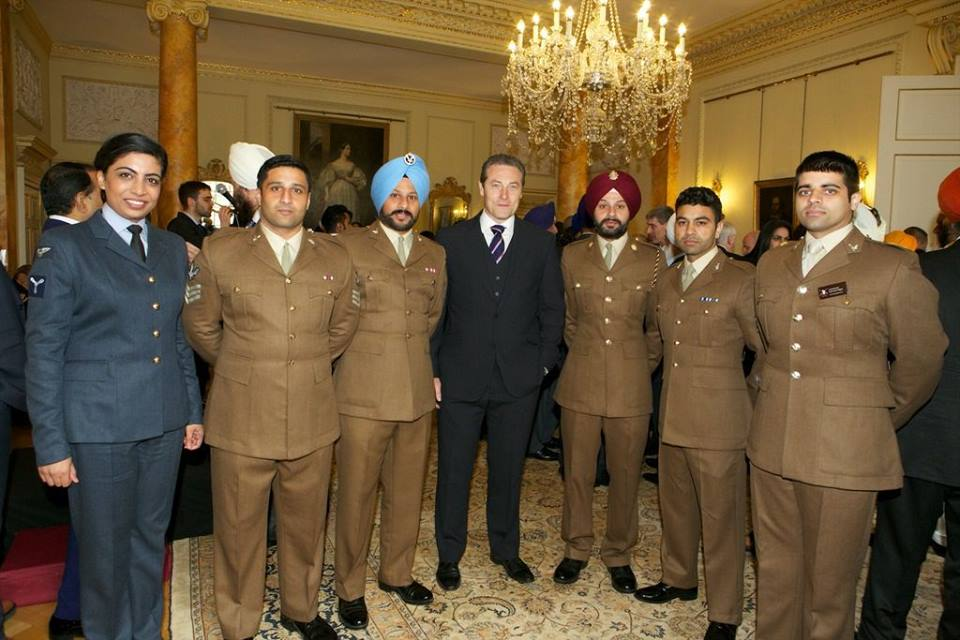
Sikh Members of the armed forces celebrating Vaisakhi at Number 10 with the Prime Minister

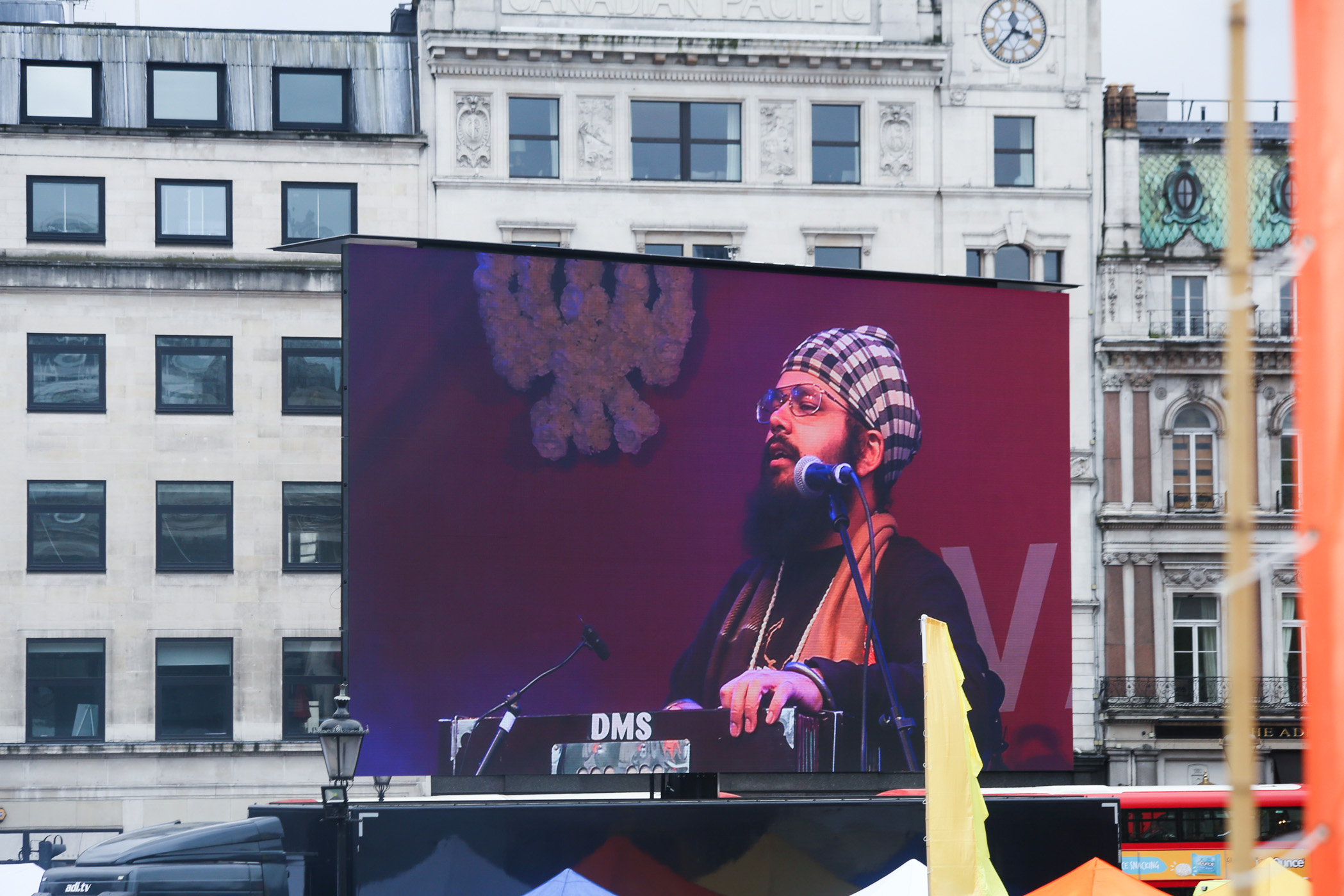
Sikhs celebrating Vaisakhi in Trafalgar Square

Some of the bigger festival celebrations within the British Sikh community include Vaisakhi, which usually involves colourful street processions throughout the country, and Diwali. Southall hosts one of the largest Vaisakhi street processions in Europe. Since 2009, both Vaisakhi and Diwali have been celebrated every year at 10 Downing Street, the residence of the British Prime Minister.

== Exemptions in British law for Sikhs ==
Sikhs are exempt from a few British laws on account of religious reasons. For example, men wearing a Dastar (turban) may ride a motorcycle without a helmet, and are permitted to wear their Kirpan as religious dress rather than as an offensive weapon in certain situations. In February 2010, Sir Mota Singh, Britain's first Asian judge, criticised the banning of the Kirpan in public places such as schools. The tenth and final guru, Guru Gobind Singh formally included the Kirpan as a mandatory article of faith for all baptised Sikhs, making it a duty for Sikhs to be able to defend the needy and suppressed, and to defend righteousness and the freedom of expression.

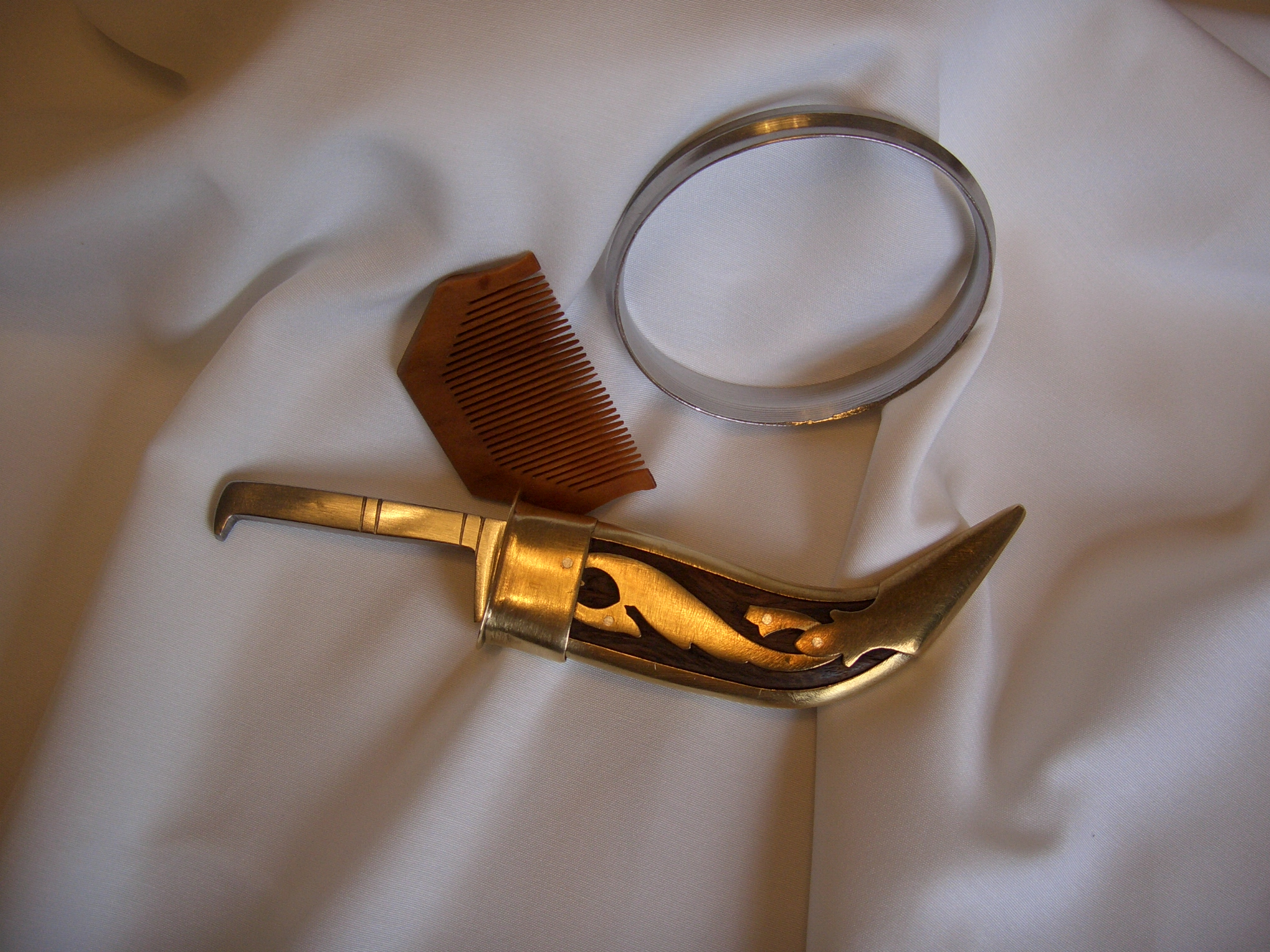
Sikh Kirpan permitted under section 139 of the Criminal Justice Act 1988 for "religious reasons"

In 2026, Vickrum Digwa was sentenced to life imprisonment for the murder of 18-year-old Polish-British student Henry Nowak. The weapon used was not a kirpan; however, the case prompted renewed debate over legal exemptions allowing Sikhs to carry ceremonial blades in the United Kingdom.

== British converts to Sikhism ==
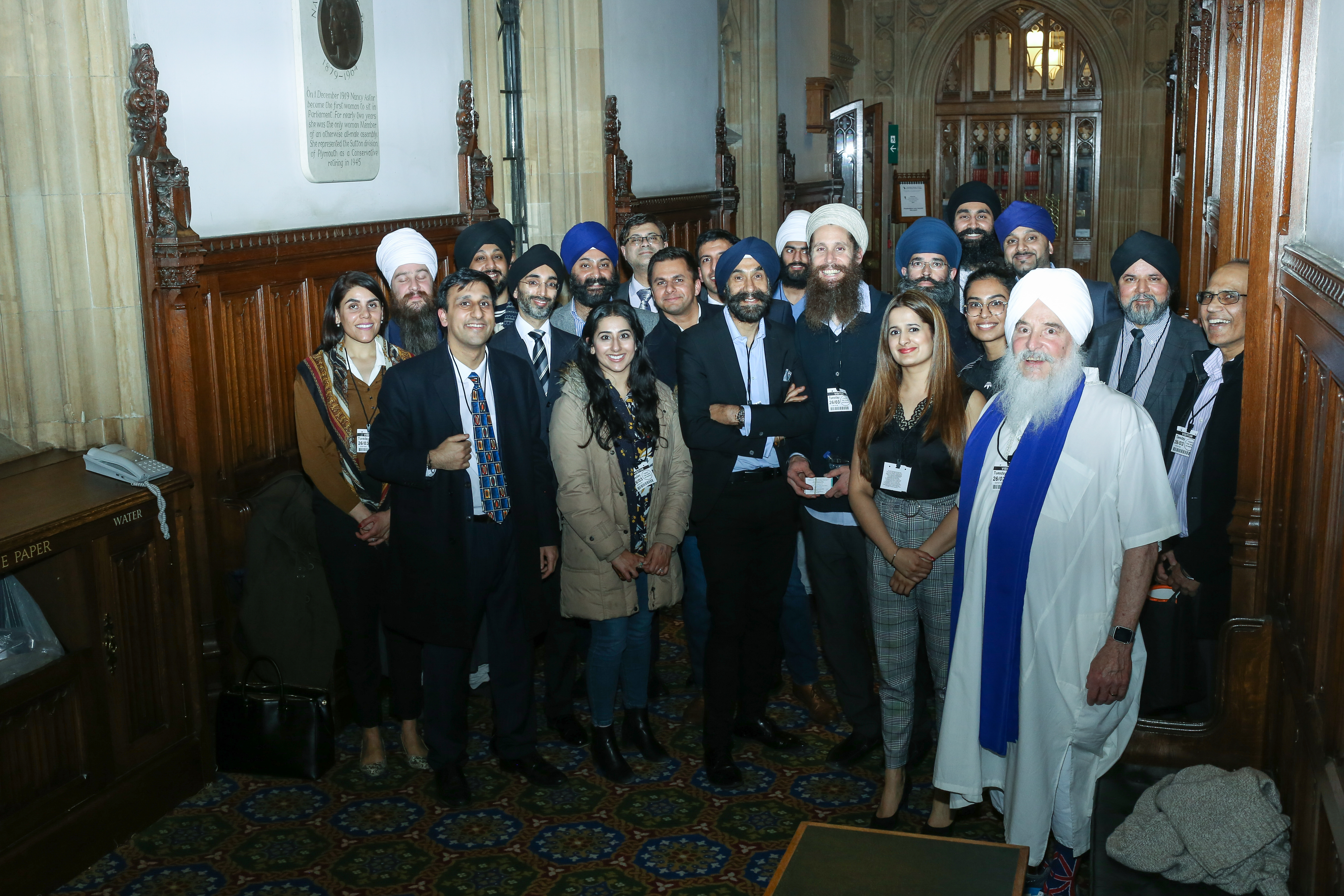
American Sikhs from the Sikhnet Team based in New Mexico visiting the UK and speaking at an event in Parliament with British Sikhs.

- Vic Briggs – former blues musician, now Vikram Singh Khalsa; became the first non-subcontinental to perform kirtan at Harimandir Sahib.
- Max Arthur Macauliffe (1841–1913) – senior administrator of the British Raj who was posted in the Punjab; prolific scholar and author; converted to Sikhism in the 1860s.

== Discrimination ==
In an online survey of 650 Sikhs in the UK, three-quarters of them said they had experienced racism. In spite of this, 95% said they are proud of being born or living in Britain. 43% of the women surveyed said they had experienced discrimination on the basis of gender, and 71% of those had also experienced it within their extended family.

== Influential British Sikh organisations ==
The Gurdwara remains the focal point of the Sikh community. There are also now a variety of notable organisations which have been setup by Sikhs to support the community:

- British Sikh Report
- Basics of Sikhi
- Central Gurdwara (Khalsa Jatha) London
- Gurdwara Sahib Leamington and Warwick
- Guru Nanak Nishkam Sevak Jatha
- Gurdwara Sri Guru Singh Sabha Southall
- Guru Nanak Gurdwara Smethwick
- Guru Nanak Darbar Gurdwara
- Nishkam SWAT
- Sangat TV
- Sikh Pioneers & Sikh Light Infantry Association UK
- Sikh Channel
- Sikh Federation (UK)
- The Sikh Awards
- The Sikh Court

== Controversies ==
=== Attitudes towards women ===
In November 2021, according to a report by Sikh Women’s Aid (SWA) organisation, about 70% of the women in the UK Sikh community have suffered domestic abuse. Over a third of the respondents had suffered child sexual abuse. Most of the victims knew their abusers and about half of the incidents took place in the home.

=== Census data ===
In 2018, some Sikh organisations requested the ONS (Office for National Statistics) to include an ethnic tick box for Sikhs, creating an ongoing dispute between various Sikh organisations. The ONS rejected the request. The ONS rejected the demand in their published paper.

=== Inter-faith marriages ===
Holding an Anand Karaj wedding ceremony between a Sikh and a non-Sikh has become a contentious issue. In 2016, armed police arrested scores of protesters at Gurdwara Sahib in Leamington Spa, which The Telegraph claims "has a history of tensions over mixed marriages". Sikh Youth UK, which was behind the protest, blamed "a rogue Gurdwara committee creating discord".

One Sikh journalist called the issue a "deepening schism" while another expressed dismay at the protesters' use of masks, and the way their actions allowed the kirpan (ceremonial dagger) to be seen as a bladed weapon rather than traditional dress, thus giving "the racists and the bigots justifications for their ignorant hatred". An investigation on BBC Asian Network found that these disruptions over interfaith marriage had been going on for years.

=== Stats ===
- In 2016, an interracial couple was terrorised for having a Sikh wedding by gangs of men.
- In 2015, a Sikh Lives Matter demonstration turned violent with at least one police officer injured.
- In 2014, a religious leader of a Sikh sect was attacked by an axe-wielding man. The attacker Harjit Singh Toor was jailed for 17 years.
- In 2004 a play by Gurpreet Kaur Bhatti sparked controversy and its performances were cancelled after violent protests. The play included a scene set in a gurdwara involving rape, physical abuse and murder. Sikhs protested its opening night at the Birmingham Repertory Theatre.

=== Alleged grooming of Sikh girls by Muslim men ===
A BBC Inside Out (London) programme televised in September 2013 interviewed several young Sikh women who were allegedly groomed and sexually abused by Muslim men, with one alleged ex-groomer even admitting that they specifically targeted Sikh girls. Bhai Mohan Singh, working for the Sikh Awareness Society (SAS), told the BBC he was investigating 19 alleged cases where Sikh girls were allegedly being groomed by older Muslim men, of which one ended with a successful conviction. In August 2013 four Muslims and two Hindus were convicted at Leicester Crown Court of paying a "vulnerable and damaged" 16-year-old Sikh girl for sex, the investigation having been opened due to evidence Bhai Mohan Singh had presented to the police.

However, a report published the previous year by Faith Matters (which runs the TELL MAMA anti-Muslim violence helpline and works closely with the Jewish Community Security Trust) claimed that the Sikh Awareness Society included radical anti-Muslim elements among its members; Faith Matters furthermore alleged it was a matter of "common consensus" that the radical Sikhs said to have had secret meetings with the English Defence League were members of the SAS. The SAS denied allegations and distanced themselves from the organization, a spokesperson telling Hope not Hate: "We would have nothing to do with any racist or fascist group, certainly one that uses religion to divide people…I know nothing about this and no, we are not in any kind of talks and discussion with them". The Nihal Show on the BBC Asian Network discussed the issue and debated the merits of the grooming claims in September 2013.

In 2018, a report by a Sikh activist organisation, Sikh Youth UK, entitled “The Religiously Aggravated Sexual Exploitation of Young Sikh Women Across the UK" made allegations of similarities between the case of Sikh Women and the Rotherham child sexual exploitation scandal. However in 2019 this report was criticised by researchers and an official UK government report led by two Sikh academics for false and misleading information. It noted: "The RASE report lacks solid data, methodological transparency and rigour. It is filled instead with sweeping generalisations and poorly substantiated claims around the nature and scale of abuse of Sikh girls and causal factors driving it. It appealed heavily to historical tensions between Sikhs and Muslims and narratives of honour in a way that seemed designed to whip up fear and hate".

=== Allegations of forced conversions of Sikh girls to Islam ===
In 2007, a Sikh girl's family claimed that she had been forcibly converted to Islam, and after being attacked by an armed gang, they received a police guard. In response to these news stories, an open letter to Sir Ian Blair signed by ten academics argued that claims that Hindu and Sikh girls were being forcefully converted were "part of an arsenal of myths propagated by right-wing Hindu supremacist organisations in India". The Muslim Council of Britain issued a press release pointing out there was a lack of evidence of any forced conversions and suggested it was an underhand attempt to smear the British Muslim population.

An academic paper by Katy Sian published in the journal South Asian Popular Culture in 2011 explored the question of how "forced conversion narratives" arose around the Sikh diaspora in the United Kingdom. Sian, who reports that claims of conversion through courtship on campuses are widespread in the UK, says that rather than relying on actual evidence they primarily rest on the word of "a friend of a friend" or on personal anecdote. According to Sian, the narrative is similar to accusations of "white slavery" lodged against the Jewish community and foreigners to the UK and the US, with the former having ties to antisemitism that mirror the Islamophobia betrayed by the modern narrative. Sian expanded on these views in her 2013 monograph Unsettling Sikh and Muslim Conflict: Mistaken Identities, Forced Conversions, and Postcolonial Formations.

=== Racially and religiously motivated attacks against Sikh women ===
In 2025, several racially and religiously aggravated attacks against Sikh women in the West Midlands were reported by UK media and investigated by police. In October 2025, West Midlands Police said a woman in her 20s had been raped in a racially aggravated attack in Walsall, and confirmed they were also investigating the rape of a Sikh woman in neighbouring Sandwell.

A further Sikh female was raped in Oldbury, and the attacks led to increased fear within the Sikh community and discussions with police and MPs about anti-Sikh hate crime.

== See also ==
- List of British Sikhs
- Sikhism in England
- Sikhism in Northern Ireland
- Sikhism in Scotland
- Sikhism in Wales
- British Indians
- British Punjabis
- British Sikh Report
- Sikhism by country
- Sikhism in Australia
- Sikhism in Canada
- Sikhism in the United States
- Sikhism in New Zealand
