= Sikh Federation (UK) =

UK based org vouching for Khalistan movement and Sikhs in the United Kingdom

Sikh Federation (UK)

The Sikh Federation (UK) (SFUK) describes itself as a non-governmental organisation that works with the main political parties to raise relevant Sikh issues. The organisation is a major pro-Khalistan organisation and supports Khalistani secessionist activities.

SFUK is a pressure group often referred to as the first Sikh political party in the United Kingdom. It says that it is based on the 'miri-piri' principle: the Sikh principle that temporal and spiritual goals are indivisible.

The organisation was established in September 2003 by Dabinderjit Singh with the aim of giving Sikhs a stronger political voice by taking an increasing interest in mainstream politics in the UK. The leadership of the Sikh Federation is almost entirely made from former members of International Sikh Youth Federation (ISYF), banned as a terrorist organisation in several countries, and SFUK serves as its successor. In 2018, India asked UK to ban SFUK for its anti-India, pro-Khalistan activities.

During his much vaunted trip to India in April 2022, a statement by UK Conservative government Prime Minister Boris Johnson that the two nations had agreed to set up an “anti-extremist taskforce” to tackle “Khalistani extremists” that were “threatening India” was criticised by the group.

The British Sikh Association condemned the SFUK for its demand for Khalistan after British Prime Minister Boris Johnson stated that his government does not support the Khalistan movement. It further alleged that Sikh Federation UK is working on the behest of Pakistan's secret agency ISI.

== Leadership ==
As of August 9 Amrik Singh Gill was the Chairman of SFUK.

It has a 15-member executive panel that manages and drives the SFUK agenda and activities, supported by a national and regional structure with local membership. The Federation's most prominent spokesman is Dabinderjit Singh.

== APPG ==
The All Party Parliamentary Group (APPG) for British Sikhs is currently chaired by Britain’s Sikh MP Preet Kaur Gill. Sikh Federation (UK) is the APPG's secretariat.
