= Gurdwara Sri Guru Singh Sabha Southall =

Gurdwara in Southall, London

Gurdwara Sri Guru Singh Sabha
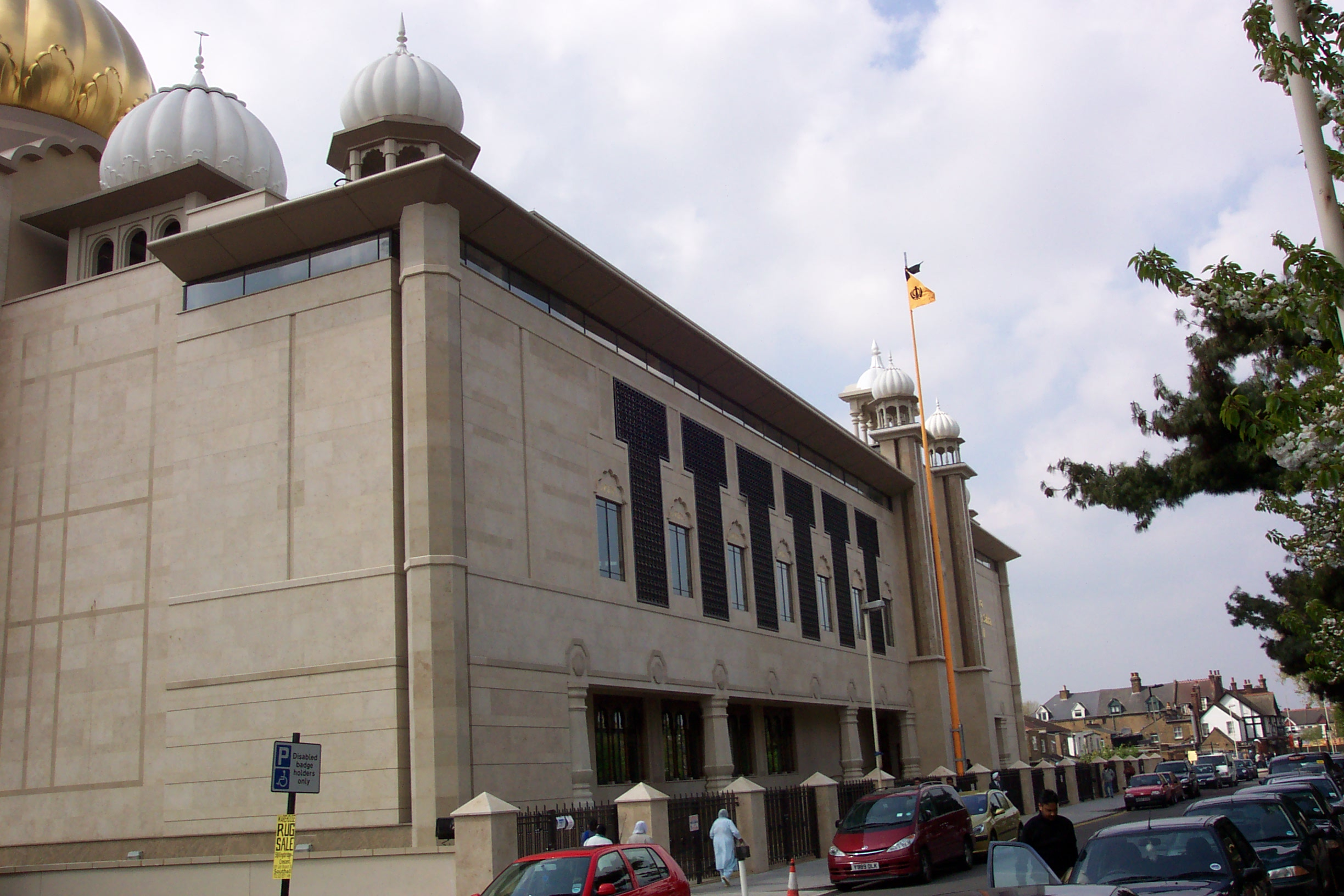
- Exterior and main entrance of Gurdwara Sri Guru Singh Sabha, Southall

Religion
- Affiliation: Sikhism
- Ecclesiastical or organizational status: Gurdwara

Location
- Location: Southall, London Borough of Ealing, England, United Kingdom
- Interactive map of Gurdwara Sri Guru Singh Sabha
- Coordinates: 51.5004°N 0.3810°W

Architecture
- Architect: Architects CoPartnership
- Type: Gurdwara
- Style: Sikh
- Completed: 2003
- Construction cost: £17.5 million
- Capacity: 3,000

Website
- www.sgsss.org

Gurdwara Sri Guru Singh Sabha Southall (SGSS) is a Sikh Gurdwara situated on Guru Nanak Road and Park Avenue, Southall, in the London Borough of Ealing. It is the largest Sikh temple in London. Building work at the Havelock Road site commenced in March 2000 and the Gurdwara opened on Sunday 30 March 2003, in order to accommodate Southall's growing Sikh community. The Gurdwara cost £17.5 million to build. It was funded by donations from members of the local Sikh community.

In June 2003, the Gurdwara was visited by then Prince of Wales, Prince Charles, (now King Charles III).

== Sikh school ==
In a bid to improve and advance the education of Sikh pupils, the gurdwara set up a brand new Sikh school – Khalsa Primary School. This school caters for children of Sikh parents as well as children of other faiths. It is located at Norwood Hall, Tentelow Lane, Southall and was purchased for £2.8 million from Ealing, Hammersmith and West London College.

== Presidency ==
The current Gurdwara president is Himmat Singh Sohi.

== See also ==
- Sikhism in the United Kingdom
