= FA People's Cup =

English association football tournament

The FA People's Cup was an annual English association football tournament organised by The Football Association. The first installment of the tournament, ran in partnership with the British Broadcasting Corporation's "Get Inspired" campaign took place in 2015.

The tournament was open to any football player over the age of 16 and was technically made up of 15 separate tournaments with 15 finals. Categories included male, female, disability (separate tournaments for men and women) and futsal. The finals were played at St George's Park National Football Centre near Burton-on-Trent. The winners of each cup got tickets to that season's FA Cup Final.

Winners

List of FA People's Cup Winners
	2015	2016	2017	2018	2019
Male	Prize Hunters	Hunters	Woolpack United	TCFC	Scorpionz Blue
Female	Liverpool Feds	A-Town Ladies	Plymouth	FC United	Who are You
Male Veterans	Canaries All Stars	Liberties Vets	Liberties Vets	Options Management	White Horse
Female Veterans	n/a	Hackney Jurassics	Hackney Jurassics	Nottingham Vets	Hackney Jurassics
Female Disability	n/a	n/a	Aston Villa	Aston Villa	Plymouth Warriors
Walking Football	Codnor FC	Grimsby Ancient Mariners	Wokingham UB50	Fleetwood Town Flyers	Pele's Pearls
Female Walking Football	n/a	n/a	n/a	n/a	Birmingham WFW Blues
Male Disability	The Manchester Amputees	Midtown	Exeter City	Westcliff United	Reading FC Deaf
Male Disability League	n/a	n/a	Portland	Danby Rovers	FC United Manchester White
Male Disability Championship	n/a	n/a	Warriors	Swale Tigers	Swale Tigers
Cerebral Palsy	West Midlands CP	n/a	n/a	n/a	n/a
U14 Boys	G4G FC	Sandwell Academy	Sproatley Juniors	Finesse Academy	n/a
U14 Girls	AFC Kempston	Harvesters Ladies	Kingston Select	Stevenage Girls	n/a
U16 Boys	ARD7	St. John's Wood FC	Dorking	Chewton	n/a
U16 Girls	Cambridge Utd	Frampton Rangers	Sprowston Girls	Bolton Lionesses	n/a
U16 Disability	n/a	Grange Academy	Cedarsfield	Maidstone United	Maidstone United Raiders FC
Male Higher Education	n/a	n/a	Filthy Fellas	LADS FC	n/a
Female Higher Education	n/a	n/a	Wockey FC	Poppy's Players	n/a
University Male	n/a	n/a	n/a	Filthy Fellas	Team Best
University Female	n/a	n/a	n/a	Lboro Rangers	Aston University
College Futsal Male	n/a	n/a	n/a	n/a	Disco Trimmers
College Futsal Female	n/a	n/a	n/a	n/a	Balotelli-Tubbies
