= Sikhism in Wales =

The arrival of Sikhism in Wales is relatively recent. As of the 2021 United Kingdom census there were 4,048 Sikhs in the country representing 0.1% of the population.

== History ==
Sikh Population History in Wales
Year	Pop.	±%
2001	2,015	—
2011	2,962	+47.0%
2021	4,048	+36.7%
Source: Office for National Statistics

Sikhs have faced some difficulties in Wales: in 2000, a popular Sikh was murdered in a racially motivated attack in Port Talbot. The issue of Sikhism in Wales again came to wider attention in 2008 when the only Sikh pupil at Aberdare Girls' School was banned from school for refusing to remove her kara though the High Court eventually ruled that the school had been wrong to exclude her.

The first purpose-built Sikh gurdwara was opened in Cardiff in 1989.

== Notable Welsh Sikhs ==
- Banita Sandhu

== See also ==
- Sikhism in England
- Sikhism in Scotland
- Religion in Wales
