= Guru Nanak Gurdwara Smethwick =

Coordinates: 52.4958°N 1.9714°W

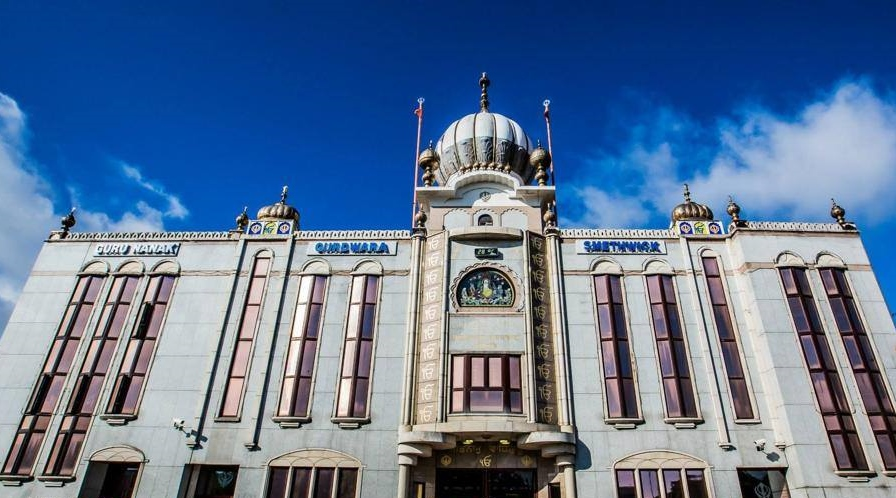

Religion
- Affiliation: Sikhism
- Leadership: Sri Guru Granth Sahib Ji
- Year consecrated: 1961

Location
- Location: 130 High Street, Smethwick, West Midlands, United Kingdom
- Interactive map of Guru Nanak Gurdwara Smethwick

Architecture
- Style: Sikh architecture

Website
- gngsmethwick.com

Guru Nanak Gurdwara Smethwick (ਗੁਰੂ ਨਾਨਕ ਗੁਰਦੁਆਰਾ ਸਮੈਦਿਕ) is a Sikh gurdwara in Smethwick, in Sandwell, near Birmingham in the West Midlands of England. It was established in October 1958 in a former church building which had been bought earlier in the year at a cost of £11,600.

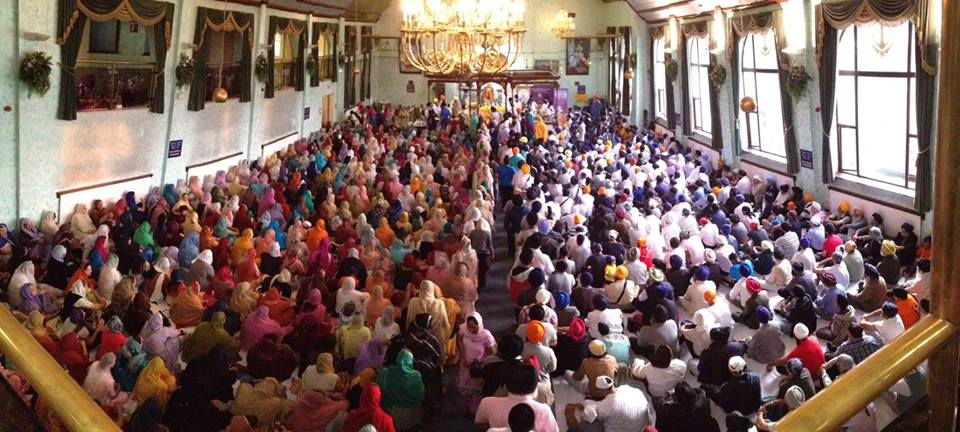
A typical Sunday at Guru Nanak Gurdwara Smethwick

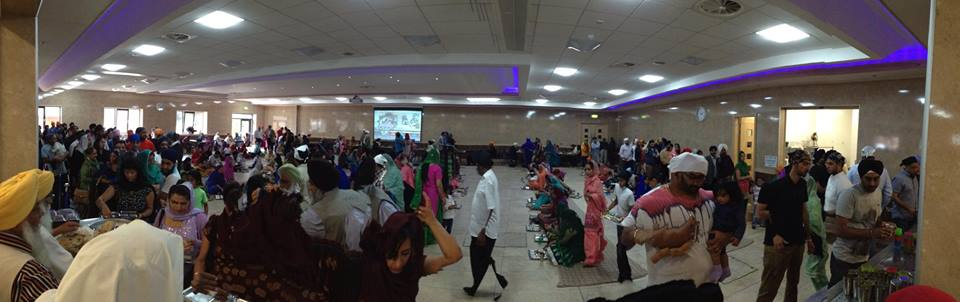
The Langar hall or Guru Ka Langar at Guru Nanak Gurdwara Smethwick

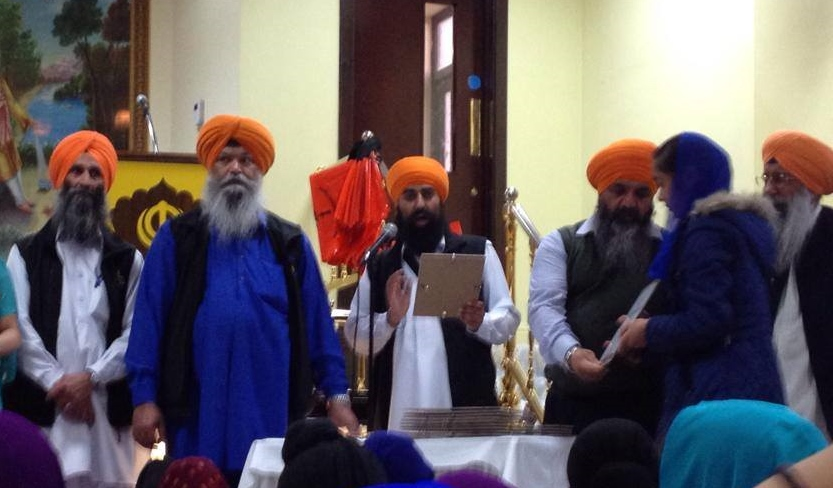
Officials of GNG Smethwick at a recent awards ceremony at the Gurdwara

== See also ==
- List of gurdwaras in the United Kingdom
