= Sikhism in Scotland =

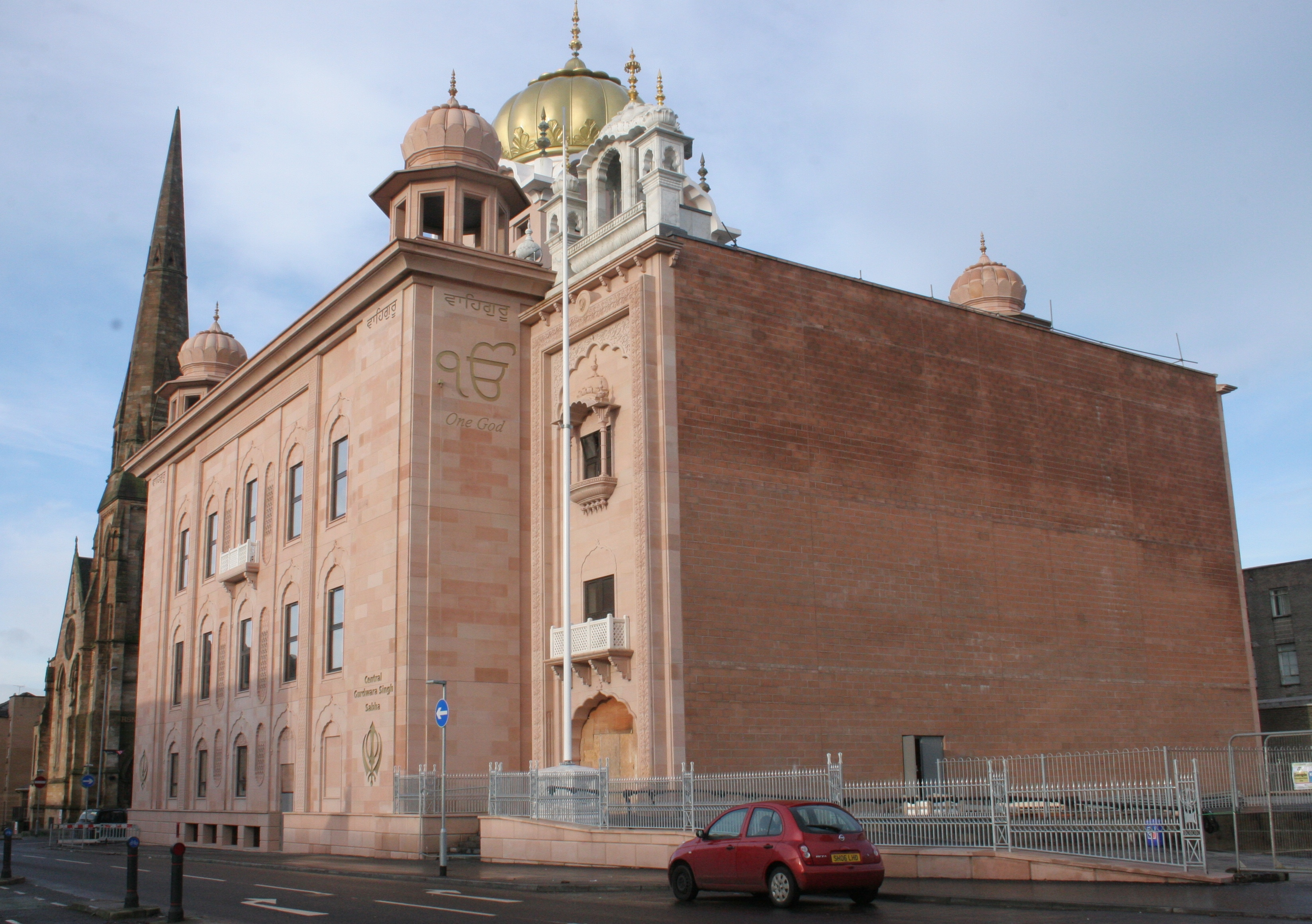
- Central Gurdwara Singh Sabha in Glasgow

Total population
- 10,988 – 0.2% (2022 Census)

Regions with significant populations
- Glasgow City: 3,456 – 0.6%
- City of Edinburgh: 1,395 – 0.3%
- East Dunbartonshire: 869 – 0.8%
- Renfrewshire: 835 – 0.5%

Sikh Population History in Scotland
Year	Pop.	±%
2001	6,572	—
2011	9,055	+37.8%
2022	10,988	+21.3%
Source: Office for National Statistics and National Records of Scotland

Sikhism in Scotland includes all aspects of Sikh life and Sikhism in Scotland. Sikhs have been present in Scotland for over a century, with the first documented Sikh, Maharaja Daleep Singh, arriving in Perthshire in 1855. The next wave of migration was in early-to-mid 1920s when prominent Sikhs of the Bhat/Bhatra community established themselves in Glasgow and Edinburgh. However, the bulk of Sikhs in Scotland come from families who immigrated during the late 20th century. In Scotland, Sikhs represented about 0.2% of the population (10,988) in the 2022 census.

== History ==
The first documented Sikh in Scotland was Maharajah Duleep Singh, who moved to Scotland in 1854, taking up residence at the Grandtully estate in Perthshire. According to the Scottish Sikh Association, the first Sikhs settled in Glasgow in the early 1920s with the first Gurdwara established in South Portland Street. However, the bulk of Sikhs in Scotland come from families who immigrated during the late 20th century.

== Demographics ==
Sikhs by Scottish Council Area - 2011 Vs 2022
Council Area	2011 Census	2021 census
Aberdeen City	129	165
Aberdeenshire	51	66
Angus	13	28
Argyll and Bute	13	48
City of Edinburgh	1,110	1,395
Clackmannanshire	29	41
Dumfries and Galloway	101	76
Dundee City	152	164
East Ayrshire	88	126
East Dunbartonshire	942	869
East Lothian	65	98
East Renfrewshire	548	618
Falkirk	122	149
Fife	324	471
Glasgow City	3,149	3,456
Highland	60	54
Inverclyde	98	63
Midlothian	20	59
Moray	3	29
Na h-Eileanan Siar	1	1
North Ayrshire	218	283
North Lanarkshire	371	672
Orkney Islands	3	3
Perth and Kinross	49	45
Renfrewshire	573	835
Scottish Borders	18	36
Shetland Islands	0	0
South Ayrshire	143	164
South Lanarkshire	385	619
Stirling	88	128
West Dunbartonshire	103	101
West Lothian	86	123

== 21st century ==
According to the 2011 Census, 0.2% of Scotland's population identifies Sikhism as their religion. Glasgow is the area with the most significant Sikh population in the country. Of the seven Gurdwaras in Scotland, four are in Glasgow, one in Edinburgh, one in Dundee and one in Irvine. Plans are also in place to open a Gurdwara in Aberdeen.

== Tartan ==
Scottish Sikhs have their own tartan, and can be seen wearing kilts made from the material.

== Gurdwaras in Scotland ==
- Guru Nanak Gurdwara, Dundee
- Guru Nanak Gurdwara, Edinburgh
- Gurdwara Sri Guru Singh Sabha, Edinburgh
- Guru Nanak Gurdwara, Glasgow (West End)
- Central Gurdwara Singh Sabha, Glasgow (Central)
- Shri Guru Tegh Bahadur Gurdwara, Glasgow (South Side)
- Gurdwara Guru Granth Sahib Sikh Sabha, Glasgow (South Side)
- Guru Nanak Gurdwara Irvine, Irvine

== Notable Scottish Sikhs ==
- Pam Gosal - Member of Scottish Parliament for West Scotland
- Hardeep Singh Kohli - Actor, comedian, presenter
- Sanjeev Kohli - Actor, comedian, presenter
- Tigerstyle - Music band of brothers Raj Singh and Pablo Singh
- Tony Singh - Chef
- Jagtar Singh Johal - Sikh activist

== See also ==
- Religion in Scotland
- Sikhism in the United Kingdom
- List of British Sikhs
- Sikhism by country
- Demographics of Scotland
- Asian-Scots
- New Scot
