= List of Punjabi media =

Daily Des Pardes

== Major Punjabi newspapers and news organizations ==
Hong Kong

- Punjabi Chetna (Punjabi Chetna)

India

- Punjab News Times
- Nirpakh Post (Nirpakh Post)
- GhaintPunjab (GhaintPunjab)
- Living India News
- TBN The Benipal Network
- Desi Channel (Desi Channel)
- Greater Punjab News
- Chardikla (Patiala)|Time TV]] (Chardikla)
- Peddler Media (peddler media)
- Azad Soch
- Daily Ajit
- The Tribune (The Tribune)
- Kiddaan (Kiddaan)
- https://primeasiatv.com/
- Punjab Newsline
- Punjab Times
- Truescoop News (Get Latest Punjab News) (Truescoop News)
- Rozana Spokesman
- DeshVidesh Times
- Punjab Hotline
- Punjabi News Online
- Punjab News Express
- Doaba Headlines
- Punjab Mail
- Monthly Wariam Jalandhar
- Ghanchi Media

Italy

Canada

- The Tv Nri
- TBN The Benipal Network
- Asian Vision
- FYI Media Group Ltd
- Punjab Newsline
- Punjabi Daily
- Sikh Press
- Sanjh Savera
- Ajit Weekly
- Hamdard Media Group

Pakistan

- Sajjan
- Khabran
- Bhulekha
- Muslim Channel
- Sher-e-Panjab
- Pakistani Pitaara
- Multani Punjabi

UK

- Sikh Times
- Akaal Channel

USA

- TBN The Benipal Network
- FYI MEDIA GROUP LTD
- Punjab Mail USA
- Quami Ekta

Other major online Punjabi newspapers

- Punjabi Chetna
- Chardhi Kala
- Punjab Newsline
- DeshVidesh Times
- Wichaar
- Media Punjab
- Europe Samachar
- Europe Vich Punjabi
- Panjabi Today

== Punjabi television channels ==
Network	Country	Genre	Website
9xTashan	India	Music	Official Site
TV Punjab	Canada	General	
Alpha ETC Punjabi	United States	General	Official Site
ATN PM One	Canada	General/Music	Official Site
ATN Punjabi	Canada	General	Official Site
ATN Punjabi News	Canada	News	Official Site
The Tv Nri	Canada	News	
Apna Channel	Pakistan	General	Official Site
Apna News	Pakistan	News	None
Awaaz-E-Watan TV	United States	Music	Official Site
Balle Balle	India	Music	None
Beat & Boom	United States	Music/Available on Roku	Official Site
Channel Punjab	United States	General Entertainment (Comedy, Soap operas and Music)	Official Site
Channel Punjabi	Canada	General	Official Site
Raftaar News	India	General/Music/entertainment/news	Official Site
Chardikala Time TV	India	Sikh Socio-Spiritual-Cultural Religious/Sikh News	Official Site
Peddler Media	India	News/Music/Entertainment	Official Site
DD Jalandhar (Terrestrial)	India	General	Official Site
DD Punjabi	India	General	None
Desi Unplugged	United States	Music Videos	Official Site
Dharti TV	Pakistan	Religious	None
ETC Channel Punjabi	India	Music/Sikh Spiritual	Official Site
Gurkebaani TV	India; United States; United Kingdom; Canada	Religious	Official Site
GET Punjabi	India	Entertainment (Soap operas and Music)	Official Site
Hamdard TV	Canada	News & Entertainment	site
HOME SHOP24X7	India	General	TELE SHOPPING CHANNEL Site
Ikta One	India	Sikh Religious	None
JUS Punjabi	United States	General	Official Site
JUS One	United States	General	Official Site
MH1	India; United States	General/Music/Punjabi movies.	Official Site
NEWS ONLY	India; United States; United Kingdom; Canada	News	Official Site
ONLY Music	India; United States; United Kingdom; Canada	Music	Official Site
(TBN) The Benipal Network	Canada	General	None
THE TV NRI	Canada	News/Music/Entertainment	Official Site
Prime Asia TV	India; United States; United Kingdom; Canada; Australia	News/Music/Entertainment	https://primeasiatv.com/
PTC News	India	News	Official Site
PTC Punjabi	India; United States	General/Music	Official Site
PTC Punjabi	Canada	General/Music	Official Site
Punjabi World Daily	India	News	Official Site
Rtv Punjabi HD	Australia	General/Music/Punjabi movies.	Official Site
Ravi TV	Pakistan	General	None
Sada Channel	India	General/Music	Official Site
Sangat TV/Global Punjab TV	United Kingdom; Canada; United States	Sikh Spiritual	Official Site
SANJHA TV	India; United States; United Kingdom; Canada; Australia	Entertainment	Official Site
Sikh Channel	United Kingdom	Sikh Devotional	Official Site
Spark Punjabi	India	International movies, dramas and shows(dubbed)	Official Site
Sur Sagar TV	Canada	General	Official Site
(TBN) The Benipal Network INC		General	None
Waaj TV	Pakistan	General	None
Zee Punjabi	India; United Kingdom (Earlier its name was Alpha Punjabi.)	General	Official Site India; Official Site United Kingdom
Living India News	India	News	Official Site

Sanjh punjab tv

== See also ==
- List of Punjabi-language television channels
- List of Punjabi-language newspapers
- Ajit
