= List of Punjabi-language newspapers =

Part of a series on

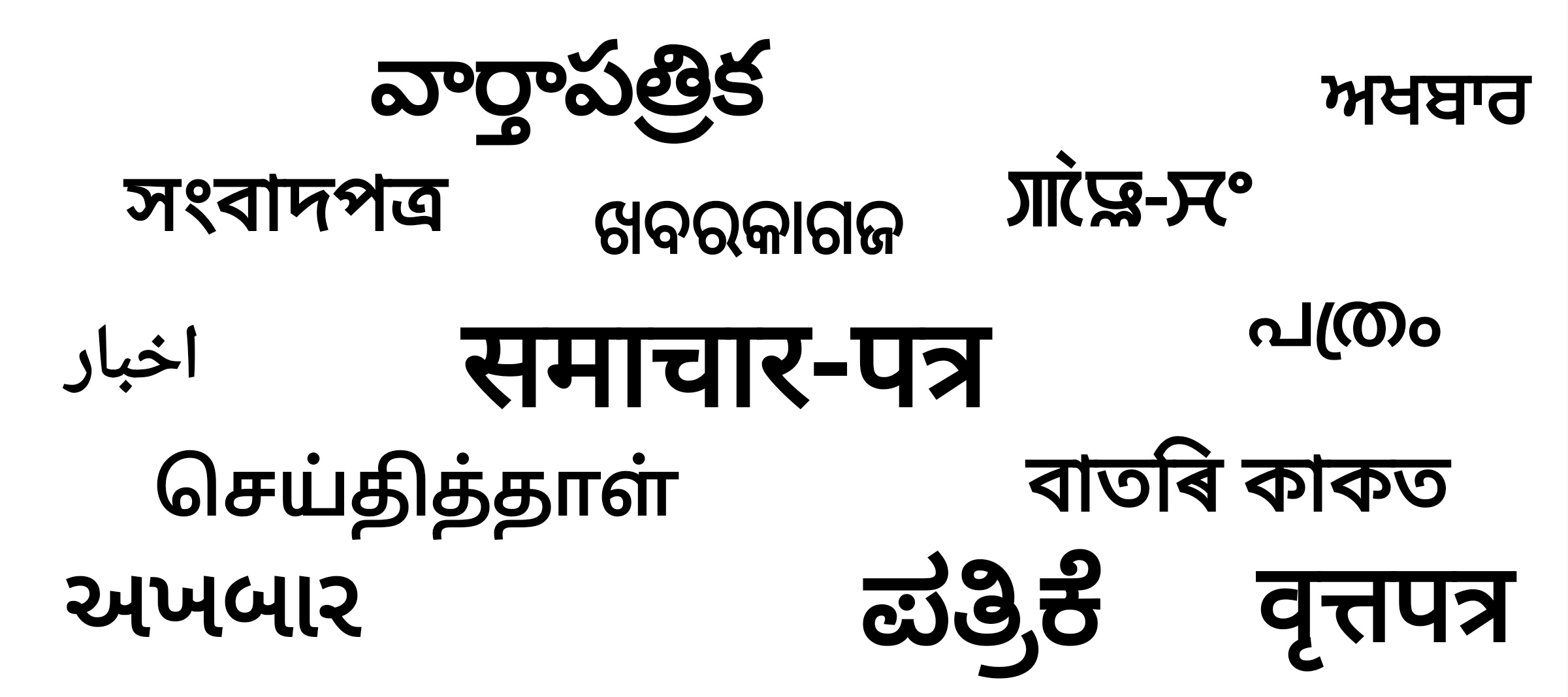

Newspapers of India
Category
Newspapers by languages
- Assamese
- Bengali
- Gujarati
- Hindi
- Kannada
- Malayalam
- Marathi
- Meitei (Manipuri)
- Punjabi
- Tamil
- Telugu
Related
- Newspapers by readership
- Registrar of Newspapers for India
- The Indian Newspaper Society

Some Punjabi language newspapers on a stall

Punjabi-language newspapers are published and circulated in India, Pakistan and some western countries. Punjabi is a language of the Punjab region, which is divided between India and Pakistan. Pakistan has the most Punjabi speakers in the world by 108,775,467 people, but the number of Punjabi-language newspapers published in Pakistan is low, in part due to the lack of government patronage and recognition of the Punjabi language. India is the country where the most Punjabi-language newspapers by 26,535,775 people, are published.

== India ==
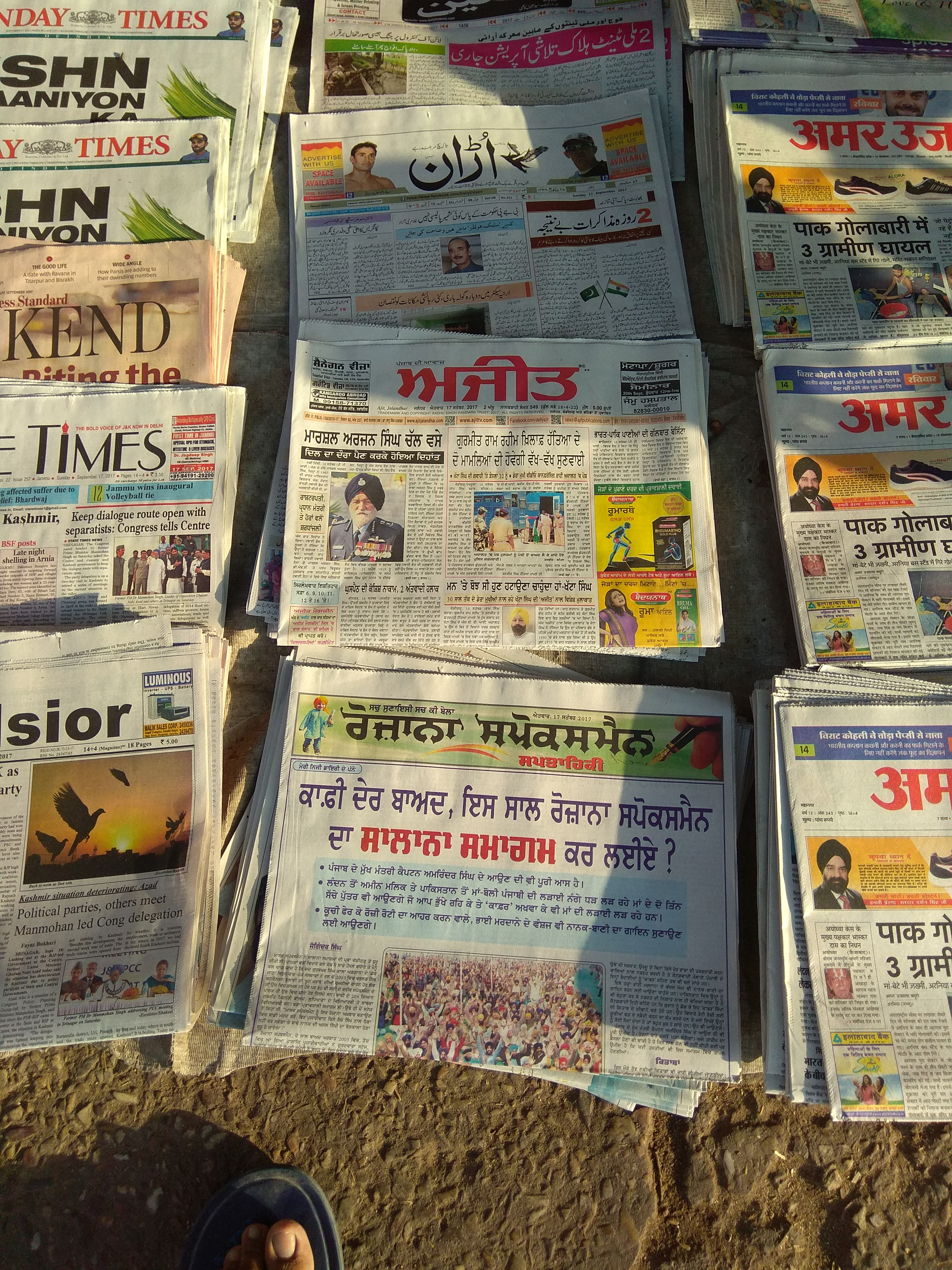
Punjabi newspapers for sale in Jammu, India, alongside Hindi, Urdu, and English newspapers.

- DaiAjit: the largest circulated Punjabi newspaper, published from Jalandhar, India. Sadhu Singh Hamdard is founder of this newspaper. 'Punjab di Aawaz' is the tagline of this newspaper.
- Daily Punjab Times: This newspaper is published by PT Live Private Limited under the editorship of S. Baljit Singh Brar from Jalandhar, Punjab. It covers Sikh mainstream media. 'Sab Da Akhbar' is the tagline of this newspaper.
- Jag Bani: This Punjabi newspaper is published by the Punjab Kesari Group of Jalandhar.
- Nawan Zamana: This newspaper is published from Jalandhar, India. It covers news from different parts of Indian Punjab, India and the world.
- Punjabi Tribune: This Punjabi newspaper is published by The Tribune group of Chandigarh, India. S. Dayal Singh Majithia is founder of this newspaper.
- Rozana Spokesman: This newspaper was founded by S. Hukum Singh ex-speaker of Indian Parliament in 1951 as a weekly magazine and it was graduated as daily newspaper in 2005. This newspaper is published from Mohali, India.
- Azad Soch: This daily newspaper is published from Patiala, India. It covers news and issues from different regions of Punjab' Hariana and India.
- Dainik Savera Times : Hindi daily published from Punjab, Chandigarh, Haryana, Jammu, Himachal Pradesh and Delhi in India.
- Nirpakh Post : Punjabi Language website and newspaper publish from SAS Nagar Mohali (Punjab).
- Punjab News Times: Punjab News Times is the latest news hub publish from Chandigarh.
- Ajj Di Awaz: This newspaper is published from Jalandhar, India. It covers news and issues from different parts of Indian Punjab, India and the world.
- Awaazqaumdi: The famous online Punjabi newspaper (Editor:- Harminder Singh Bhatt/Tarsem Mehto). It publishes news from various cities of Punjab, India and the world.
- Awaza-E-Kom A weekly Punjabi newspaper published from Dharam Singh Market, Amritsar, Punjab India. ESTD: 1980 Regd.No.NRI/05/11/03/86
- Azad Soch:A leading Punjabi Newspaper published from Punjab.
- Charhdikala: ਚੜ੍ਹਦੀਕਲਾ This Punjabi newspaper is published from Patiala, India.
- Daily Sanjhi Khabar: Published in Chandigarh
- Daily Suraj: This daily newspaper is published from Ludhiana since 1970. It covers news from different parts of Indian Punjab and India.
- Desh Videsh Times: This Punjabi newspaper is published in India and Canada.
- Deshsewak: This newspaper was started on 1 January 1996 from Chandigarh, India. 'Baba Sohan Singh Bhakna' group was founded under the patronage of Harkishan Singh Surjeet to start this newspaper.
- Doaba Headlines: This newspaper was started on 26 May 2002 from Nakodar, India. Ram Singh Aulakh is its founder and current Editor-in-Chief.
- Jagat Sewak: This Punjabi weekly newspaper is published from Bagha Purana, India. Its editor in chief is Tarlochan Singh Brar. It features articles of renowned writers like Jatinder Pannu. It covers news from Punjab, Delhi and Chandigarh.
- Jammu Prabhat: The only Punjabi newspaper in the Dogri dialect of Punjabi. It publishes news from various cities of Jammu and Kashmir, India and the world.
- Janjagriti: This daily Punjabi newspaper is published from Ludhiana India.
- Khuli Soch: The only Punjabi daily evening newspaper published from Ludhiana since 2012.
- Khuli Soch: This weekly Punjabi newspaper is published from India. Rajesh Kumar Sharma is its editor.
- Live Punjab: This Punjabi news website covers news from different parts of India news about Punjabi overseas, immigration to Canada, and Punjabi news.
- Malwa Mail: This Punjabi weekly newspaper is published from Bagha Purana, India. Its editor in chief is Phool Mittal. It features articles by renowned writers like Jatinder Pannu and Prof. Inder Singh Ghagga. It covers news from Punjab, Delhi and Chandigarh.
- Malwa Post: This Punjabi newspaper is published from Bathinda, India. It covers news from the Malwa region of Indian Punjab.
- Nirpakh Awaaz (ਨਿਰਪੱਖ ਆਵਾਜ਼): This Online Punjabi News media, which covers maximum areas of Punjab, Canada, America and Europe. Nirpakh Awaaz covers news from different parts of Indian Punjab, India and the world.
- Pehredar (ਪਹਿਰੇਦਾਰ): Renowned Sikh scholar Jaspal Singh 'Heran' (ਜਸਪਾਲ ਸਿੰਘ 'ਹੇਰਾਂ') is Founder and Chief Editor of this newspaper. Pehredar is one of the leading Punjabi daily newspapers published in India with a functioning base at Ludhiana. 'Hak Sach Da Pehredar' (ਹੱਕ ਸੱਚ ਦਾ ਪਹਿਰੇਦਾਰ) is the tagline of this newspaper.
- Punjab Express: This Punjabi newspaper publishes news from various cities of Indian Punjab, India and the world, especially of neighbouring countries of India.
- Punjab Infoline: This newspaper is published from Ludhiana, India.
- Punjab Mail Online: This leading online news portal is updated daily and published from Punjab, India.
- Punjab Post: a complete Punjabi and English newspaper, online daily and printed weekly from Holy City Amritsar
- Punjabi Bollywood Tadka: This Punjabi Newspapaer contain Bollywood gossip.
- Punjabi Jagran: This newspaper is published by the Jagran group in India. It covers news from different parts of Indian Punjab, India and the world.
- Punjabi Screen voice of Pollywood
- Raisingvoice: This newspaper was co founded by Mr Harvinder as online news website 2016. This website operated in Ludhiana, Punjab (India).
- Sachkahoon: This Punjabi newspaper is India by Dera Sachcha Sauda organisation. 'Kall, Ajj te Bhalke' is tagline of this newspaper. It covers news from the southern region of Indian Punjab. Sach Kahoon Newspaper largest selling Newspaper in Malwa Resign in Punjab. More than 250,000 copies selling Daily. Sach Kahoon 3rd highest selling Punjabi newspaper in Punjab, after Ajit and Jagbani.
- Shaheed-e-Azam: started in 1983 from Patiala
- Daily Des Pardes ( Punjabi Newspaper)RNI NO 51354/90
- Yugmarg (English Newspaper) RNI NO 61323/95

== Pakistan ==
These newspapers are published in the Shahmukhi script of Punjabi language.

- Sajjan: Sajjan (Punjabi: روزوار سجن / ਰੁਜ਼ਾਨਾ ਸਜਣ) was the first Punjabi newspaper started in 1989 by Zafaryab Ahmad and Hussain Naqi. Both gentlemen were associated with English press in Pakistan. There were not publishing software for shahmukhi, katibs write the whole paper and it was a costly process at that time. Sajjan was an experiment to make a way for later Punjabi newspapers in Pakistan, it was estimated that newspaper will be defunct in 3 or 6-month but news paper survived for more than year and defunct in 1990. Sajjan style was like the English newspapers but people were used to with Urdu newspaper which are different in style. .
- Bhulekha: Daily Bhulekha is Punjabi shahmukhi newspaper published by Mudassar Iqbal Butt from Lahore. Bhulekha operates from two cities of Punjab Lahore and Gujranwala.It covers regional, national and international news. This newspaper has been launched when there was no Punjabi newspaper in the country, Bhulekha has maximum number of circulations in Punjabi daily's of Pakistan. Daily Bhulekha was stated in 1995 after the closure of first complete Pakistani Punjabi newspaper Sajjan.
- Khabran: Urdu daily newspaper Khabrain started its sindhi, Punjabi and pashto versions. Khabran was the Punjabi version of this newspaper published in Shahmukhi. Khabran started its service from three cities of Punjab Lahore, Rawalpindi and Multan. Khabran was defunct in 2005 while its sindhi version is still publishing.
- Daily Lokaai: This is one of the few daily Punjabi language newspapers of Pakistan. It is published from Lahore in the Shahmukhi script of Punjabi. It covers news from different parts of Pakistani Punjab, Punjab and the world. This newspaper has been launched to reach Punjabi readers of Pakistan and keep alive the Punjabi language in Pakistan.

== Western countries ==
- Ajit Weekly: Launched in 1993, this become the world's largest Punjabi weekly by bringing out editions from Toronto, New York, California and Vancouver. It is distributed free all over North America. The H.O. is located in Mississauga, Ontario, Canada. It covers a wide range of news and articles related to India, Indians and international readers. It features Bollywood, Hollywood, sports, stories, and horoscopes. It was the first Punjabi weekly to be online, with the launch of its web portal in 1998.
- Ambedkar Times: Ambedkar Times in English is published from Sacramento, California, USA www.ambedkartimes.com
- The Contact: This weekly was launched in 2002 by the Ajit Weekly group of newspapers from Toronto, Canada. It is distributed free all over Canada. It is the most popular South Asian weekly publication, covering Bollywood, Hollywood, and Indian political and international news. It specializes in weird news from around the world. It includes weekly horoscope, international kitchen, sports and philosophical contents. The head office is in Mississauga, Canada.
- Daily Khushbow Sabhyachar Di
- Desh Doaba Desh Doaba weekly newspaper is published from Sacramento, California, USA
- Europe Samachar
- Europe Vich Punjabi
- Hamdard Weekly: It started on 13 April 1991, originally named Canada Ajit. It also publishes a monthly magazine, Quomantary. It is published from Toronto, Vancouver, New York, California, and Chandigarh.
- Indo Times: This is the first Punjabi newspaper published from Australia and New Zealand. S. Taswinder Singh is its Editor-in-Chief.
- Indo US Trucking: This Punjabi language newspaper is for Punjabi-speaking truckers. It is published from Sacramento, California, and distributed all over North America. It covers new rules and regulations of truck-related business in the USA.
- Media Punjab
- NZ Punjabi news: online Punjabi newspaper from Auckland
- Panjabi Today
- Punjab Mail USA: This Punjabi newspaper is published in Sacramento, California, USA. It is distributed free all over North America. Its website is updated daily. It is the first ever Punjabi language newspaper published from Sacramento, California. The website is very popular. Punjab Mail TV Channel is also available on IP Box and as well as on all social media
- Punjab Newsline
- Punjab Post: This weekly Punjabi newspaper was launched in 2009. It is published from Calgary, and distributed all over Alberta, Saskatoon.
- Punjab Star News: Launched in 2005, this Punjabi newspaper is published from Los Angeles, California, USA. It is distributed free all over California. It is now in updated 24/7. It covers a wide range of Punjab, India, and international news and articles. It also covers Punjab politics, NRI news, sports, Hollywood, and Bollywood.
- Punjab Star: Launched in April 2002 from Mississauga, Canada. It is now updated daily in Punjabi and English online.
- The Punjabi Star: Vancouver's most read weekly Punjabi newspaper, started in 2002
- Quami Ekta: This Punjabi newspaper is completely designed and printed in the United States. It mainly focuses on Punjabi NRIs. It was founded as an online newspaper in 2002 and in 2004 a print edition was started.
- Sanjh Savera: This newspaper is published from Canada. It covers issues and news related to Canadian Punjabis and Sikhs. It was established in 1978.
- Sher-E-Panjab: It was started in August 1998 from New York. It is the only subscription based Punjabi newspaper in USA. It also has an online edition.
- Sikh Spokesman: This Punjabi language weekly newspaper is published in Toronto, Ontario. It is updated daily online, and the print version comes out every Friday. It is distributed all over the greater Toronto area.
- Sikh Times
- Wichaar

== See also ==
- List of Punjabi media
- List of Punjabi-language television channels
