= List of newspapers in Pakistan =

Comprehensive list of newspapers across Pakistan

The total number of newspapers in Pakistan as of 2019 was 707 according to the Pakistan Bureau of Statistics.

No.	Newspaper	Type	Language	Location	Founded	Notes
1	Pakistan Times (Urdu: پاکستان ٹائمز)	Daily	English, Urdu	Lahore, Karachi, Islamabad, Peshawar, Gujranwala	4 February 1947	Defunct
2	Daily Qudrat	Daily	Urdu and English	Quetta, Karachi, Islamabad	2004	Founded by Naimat Ullah Achakzai. Founded on 4 April 2004 From Quetta balochistan. Online (digital) publication started in 2011.
3	The Dayspring	Fortnightly	English	Islamabad	2018	Pakistan first youth centric news agency independent newspaper of Dayspring Media, launched on 1 November 2018.
4	Pahanji Akhbar (Sindhi: پيهنجي اخبار)	Daily	Sindhi	Karachi, Hyderabad, Islamabad, Sukkur	2018	First completely digital Sindhi Newspaper.
5	Daily Jhoke	Daily	Saraiki	Multan, Khanpur, Dera Ismail Khan, Karachi	1990	
6	Daily Ibrat (Urdu: عبرت)	Daily	Sindhi	Hyderabad, Karachi, Sukkur, Lahore, Islamabad.	1958	International and regional news
7	Daily Jang (Urdu: روزنامہ جنگ)	Daily	Urdu	Karachi, Lahore, Rawalpindi, Multan, London	1946	Second-oldest continuously published Urdu language newspaper in Pakistan
8	Daily Nawa-i-Waqt	Daily	Urdu	Lahore, Karachi, Rawalpindi, Islamabad, Multan	1940	Oldest continuously published Urdu language newspaper in Pakistan
9	Daily The Patriot	Daily	English	Islamabad, Lahore	–	
10	Khabrain (Urdu: خبریں)	Daily	Urdu	Islamabad, Lahore, Karachi, Hyderabad, Multan, Muzafarabad, Peshawer, Sukker	1992	
11	Daily Express (Urdu: ایکسپریس)	Daily	Urdu	Islamabad, Karachi, Lahore, Faisalabad, Quetta, Peshawar, Multan	1998	International and regional news
12	Daily Global Current News (Urdu: گلوبل نیوز )	Daily	Urdu / English	All Pakistan	1992	International and regional news
13	BOL News (Urdu: بول نیوز)	Daily	Urdu / English	All Pakistan	2013	International and regional news
14	Daily Nai Baat	Daily	Urdu	Lahore, Karachi, Multan, Peshawar, Quetta	2011	Current/political
15	Daily Sarhad (Urdu: سرحد)	Daily	Urdu	Peshawar	1970	
16	Business Recorder	Daily	English	Karachi, Islamabad and Lahore	1965	Pakistan's first financial newspaper
17	Daily Times	Daily	English	Lahore, Karachi, Islamabad	2002	
18	Dawn	Daily	English	Karachi, Islamabad and Lahore	1947	Founded by Muhammad Ali Jinnah
19	The Friday Times	Weekly	English	Lahore	1989	Weekly newspaper
20	Bayan	Daily	Urdu	Peshawar	2017	
21	The Frontier Post	Daily	English	Peshawar, Quetta and Lahore	1985	
22	The Nation	Daily	English	Lahore, Karachi, and Islamabad	1986	
23	The News International	Daily	English	Karachi, Lahore, Islamabad/Rawalpindi and London	1991	
24	Pakistan Observer	Daily	English	Islamabad, Karachi, Lahore, Peshawar, Muzaffarabad and Quetta	1988	
25	The Post	Daily	English	Lahore, Islamabad and Karachi	2005	Defunct
26	Khalsa Akhbar Lahore	Daily	Punjabi	Lahore	1886	Defunct
27	The Regional Times of Sindh	Daily	English	Karachi, Hyderabad	–	
28	The Star	Daily	English	Karachi	1951	Dawn Group's evening newspaper; now defunct
29	The Statesman	Daily	English	Peshawar	2002	
30	Pakistan Today	Daily	English	Lahore, Karachi, Islamabad	2010	
31	Daily Pakistan	Daily	Urdu	Lahore, Islamabad, Karachi, Peshawar	1997	
32	The Express Tribune	Daily	English	Karachi, Lahore, Islamabad, Peshawar	2010	
33	Daily Dunya	Daily	Urdu	Lahore, Karachi, Faisalabad, Gujranwala, Multan, Islamabad	2012	
34	Daily Nizam (Urdu: روزنامہ نظام)	Daily		Islamabad	2017	Authentic continuously published Urdu language newspaper in Pakistan
35	Wahdat (Pashto: وحدت)	Daily	Pashto	Peshawar	1983	
36	Sajjan (Punjabi: سجن)	Daily	Punjabi	Lahore	1989	First Punjabi newspaper of Pakistan, started in 1989 by Hussain naqi and defunct in 1990. Started online website again in 2019.
37	Daily Lokaai (Punjabi: لوکائی)	Daily	Punjabi	Lahore	2006	
38	Bhulekha (Punjabi: بھلیکھا)	Daily	Punjabi	Lahore, Gujranwala	1989	
39	Daily Hilal-e-Pakistan (Sindhi: هلال پاڪستان)	Daily	Sindhi	Karachi	1946	
40	Daily Kawish (Sindhi: ڪاوش)	Daily	Sindhi	Hyderabad	1990	
41	Daily Koshish (Sindhi: ڪوشش)	Daily	Sindhi	Hyderabad	1998	
42	Daily Mehran (Sindhi: مهراڻ)	Daily	Sindhi	Hyderabad	1957	
43	Daily 92 (Urdu: روزنامہ ٩٢)	Daily	Urdu	Islamabad, Karachi, Lahore, Faisalabad, Quetta, Peshawar, Multan	–	
44	Daily Safeer (Sindhi: سفیر)	Daily	Sindhi	Hyderabad		
45	Daily Sindh (Sindhi: سنڌ)	Daily	Sindhi	Hyderabad	1995	
46	Daily Sindhu (Sindhi: سنڌو)	Daily	Sindhi	Hyderabad	1989	
47	Daily Basharat (Urdu: روزنامہ بشارت)	Daily	Urdu	Karachi, Hyderabad, Gilgit	1952	
48	Daily Ummat	Daily	Urdu	Karachi	1996	
49	Manaqib (Urdu: مناقب)	Daily	Urdu	Islamabad, Sargodha	2016	Pakistan and World News
50	Qum News	Weekly	Urdu	Karachi, Hyderabad, shikarpur and whole Pakistan	2017	Founded by Rasheed Azad
51	Christian Voice	Weekly	English	Karachi	1950	Second oldest Catholic publication in Pakistan
52	Indus News	Daily	Sindhi	Islamabad	2010	Indusnews.net was launched in the name dxingworld.info on 4 Dec 2010, later name was changed in July 2011 and in the same year Indus News won a regional news award in regional news blogs. Chief Editor: Zahoor Solangi
53	Weekly Parda Chaak (Urdu: ہفت روزہ پردہ چاک)	Weekly	Urdu	Lahore, Pakistan	1991	Founded by Sheikh Waseem Ahmad Anwar. Parda chaak is a weekly news publication being regularly published from Lahore Pakistan.
54	Daily Ausaf	Daily	Urdu	Lahore, Karachi, Peshawar, Europe, Kashmir, Gilgit-Baltistan	1997	Its chief editor is Mehtab Khan. Daily Ausaf was inaugurated on 25 December 1997 from Islamabad
55	Daily Aaj	Daily	Urdu	Peshawar, Abbottabad	1989	Editor-in-chief: A.W. Yousfi
56	Daily Mashriq	Daily	Urdu	Peshawar	1963	Founder is Inayat Ullah Khan
57	Daily Talib	Daily	Urdu	Quetta	2004	Online (digital) publication started in 2021
58	Al Akhbar	Daily	Urdu	Islamabad, Muzaffarabad	–	
59	Awam	Daily	Urdu, Sindhi	Karachi	1994	
60	Civil and Military Gazette	Daily	Urdu	Lahore, Karachi	1872	Defunct in 1963
62	Daily Asas	Daily	Urdu	Rawalpindi, Lahore, Karachi, Faisalabad, Muzaffarabad	1995	
63	Daily Awam	Daily	Urdu	Islamabad, Quetta, Hub.	1989	Defunct in 2018
64	Daily Awami Awaz	Daily	Sindhi	Karachi	–	
65	Daily Din	Daily	Urdu	Karachi, Lahore, Faisalabad, Islamabad, Rawalpindi		
66	Daily Imroze	Daily	Urdu	Lahore, Karachi	pre 1947	
67	Daily Inqilab	Daily	Urdu	Lahore	1927	Defunct in 1949
68	Daily Jasarat	Daily	Urdu	Karachi	1970	
69	Daily Qaumi Bandhan	Daily	Bengali	Karachi	1940s	Defunct
70	Khyber Mail	Daily	Urdu	Peshawar	1932	Defunct in 1989
71	Daily Maidan	Daily	Urdu	Peshawar	–	
72	Millat	Daily	Gujrati, Urdu	Karachi	1948	
73	Talár	Daily	Brahui	–	–	
74	Agahi	Weekly	Urdu	Karachi	2006	
75	Zamindar	–	Urdu	Lahore	1873	Defunct in 1956
76	Nawai Watan	–	Balochi	Quetta	–	
77	Sandesh	–	Urdu, Sindhi	Kotri	–	
78	Socialist Weekly	Weekly	Urdu	Karachi	1947	Defunct
79	Daily Sehar	Daily	Urdu	Lahore	2006	
80	Daily Nai Roshni	Daily	Urdu	Multan	1985	
81	Maidan Daily	Daily	Urdu	Peshawar and Quetta		
82	Independent News Pakistan		English, Urdu	Islamabad, Karachi, Lahore, Quetta, Peshawar	1996	
