= List of Sindhi-language newspapers =

The Sindhi language has a long history of arts, literature, and culture. The first Sindhi newspaper was Sind Sudhar, founded in 1884. Sindhi language newspapers played a vital role for Independence in 1947; In 1920, Al-Wahid newspaper published by Haji Abdullah Haroon in Karachi.

== Sindhi newspapers in Pakistan ==
Following is a list of Sindhi newspapers from Sindh in Pakistan.

Name of Newspaper	Type	Location	Founded	Year	Notes
Sind Sudhar (Sindhi: سنڌ سڌار)	Daily	Sindhi		1884	
Hilal-e-Pakistan (Sindhi: هلال پاڪستان)	Daily	Sindhi	Karachi	1946	
Mehran (Sindhi: مهراڻ)	Daily	Sindhi	Hyderabad	1957	
Awami Awaz (Sindhi: روزاني عوامي آواز)	Daily	Sindhi	Karachi		
Daily Kawish	Daily	Sindhi	Hyderabad	1991	Kawish Group

== See also ==
- List of newspapers in Pakistan
