= Sikhism in England =

People of the Sikh faith in England

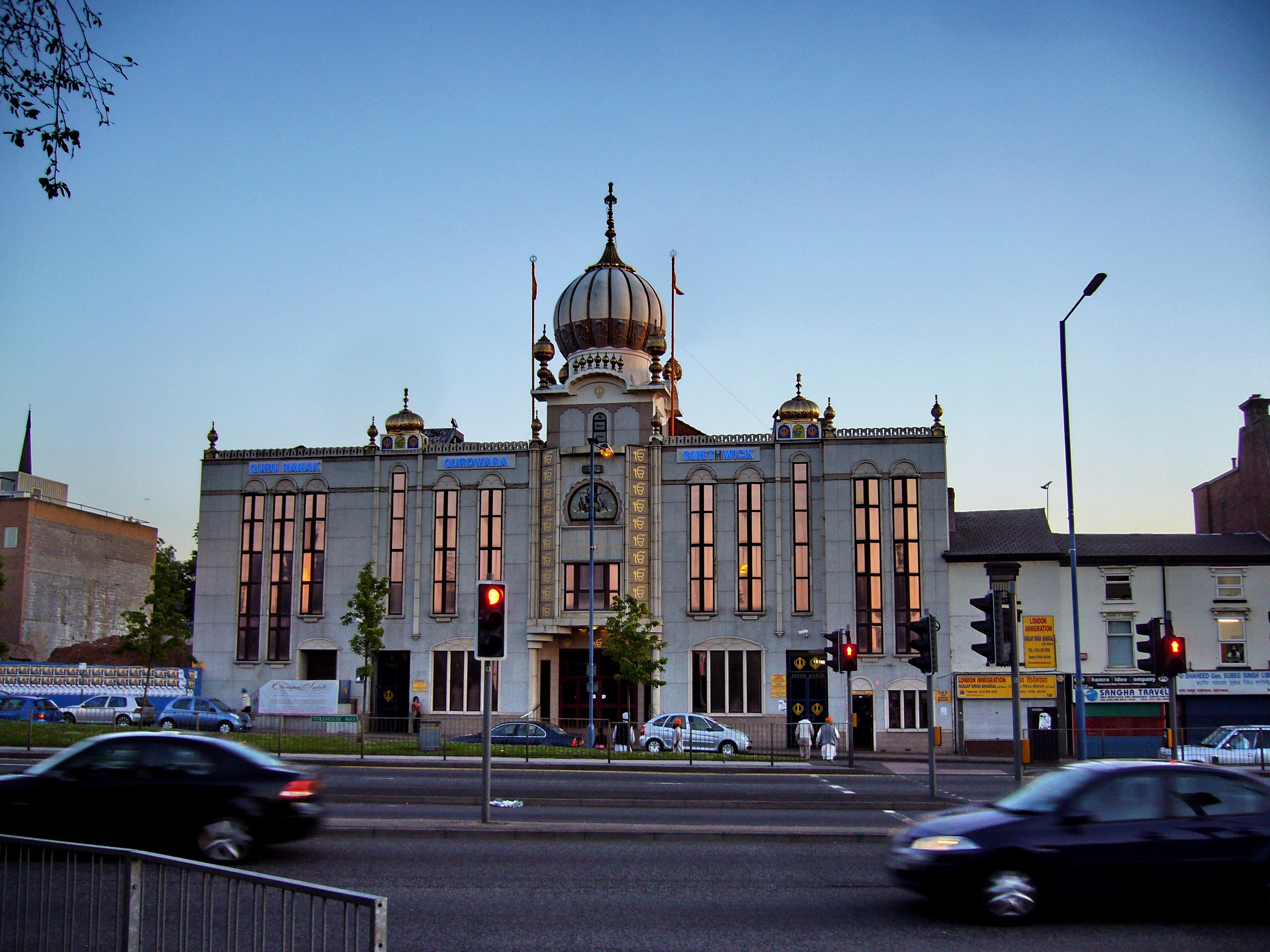
- The Guru Nanak Gurdwara Smethwick.

Total population
- 520,092; 0.92% of the total population (2021)

Regions with significant populations
- West Midlands: 172,398 (2.90%)
- London: 144,543 (1.64%)
- South East: 74,348 (0.80%)
- East Midlands: 53,950 (1.11%)
- East: 24,284 (0.38%)

Religions
- Sikhism

Languages
- British English • Punjabi; Hindi • Urdu

English Sikhs number over 520,000 people and account for 0.9% of England's population in 2021, forming the country's fourth-largest religious group. In 2006 there were 352 gurdwaras in England. The largest Sikh populations in the UK are in the West Midlands and Greater London.

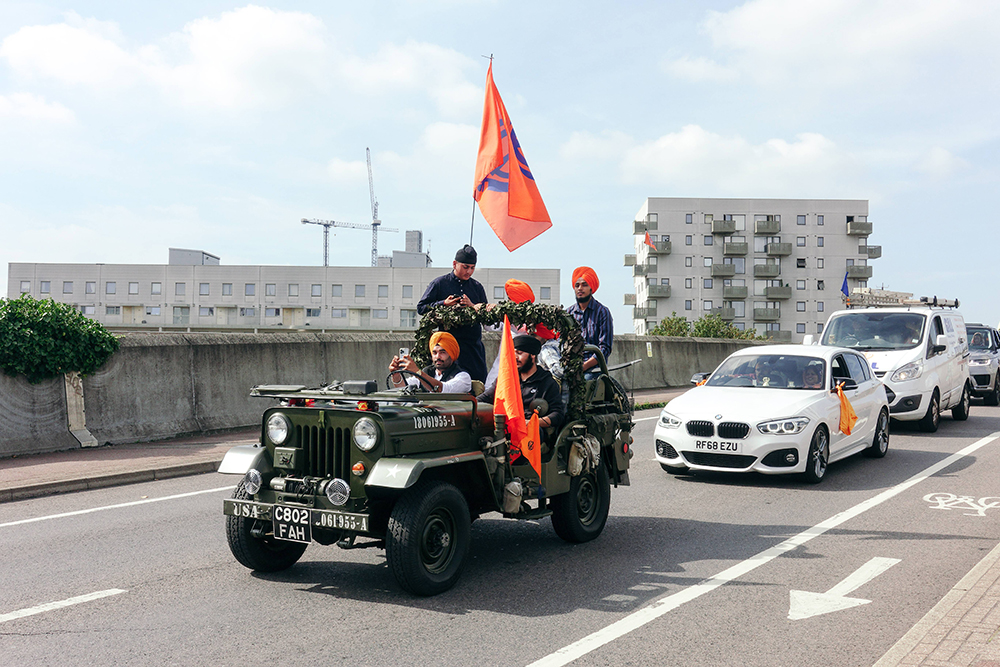
Nagar kirtan convoy in Barking, London.

Sikh Population History in England
| Year | Pop. | ±% |
|---|---|---|
| 2001 | 327,343 | — |
| 2011 | 420,196 | +28.4% |
| 2021 | 520,092 | +23.8% |
Source: Office for National Statistics

== History ==
The permanent arrival of Sikhism in England is dated to 1850 A.D. with the arrival of Maharajah Duleep Singh (last ruler of the Sikh Empire). The first Sikh place of worship, called a Gurdwara, was opened in 1911 in London and this was partly funded by the Maharaja of Patiala. Prior to this the first Sikh Society called Khalsa Jatha was formed in 1908.

In 2019, the statue of Sikh soldier was unveiled in the West Yorkshire to commemorate the Sikhs martyrs in the World War I and World War II.

== Demographics ==
=== Geographical Distribution ===
Top ten English local authorities by Sikh population, 2021
| Local authority | Population |
|---|---|
| Sandwell | 39,252 |
| Birmingham | 33,126 |
| Wolverhampton | 31,769 |
| Ealing | 28,491 |
| Hillingdon | 26,339 |
| Hounslow | 24,677 |
| Slough | 17,985 |
| Redbridge | 17,622 |
| Coventry | 17,297 |
| Walsall | 17,148 |

Top ten English local authorities by Sikh proportion, 2021
| Local authority | Percentage |
|---|---|
| Wolverhampton | 12.0% |
| Sandwell | 11.5% |
| Slough | 11.3% |
| Hillingdon | 8.6% |
| Hounslow | 8.6% |
| Gravesham | 8.0% |
| Ealing | 7.8% |
| Oadby and Wigston | 7.5% |
| Walsall | 6.0% |
| Redbridge | 5.7% |

English Sikhs by region (2001−2021)
| Region | 2021 | | 2011 | | 2001 | |
| Region | Pop. | % | Pop. | % | Pop. | % |
|---|---|---|---|---|---|---|
| West Midlands | 172,398 | 2.9% | 133,681 | 2.39% | 103,870 | 1.97% |
| London | 144,543 | 1.64% | 126,134 | 1.54% | 104,230 | 1.45% |
| South East | 74,348 | 0.8% | 54,941 | 0.64% | 37,735 | 0.47% |
| East Midlands | 53,950 | 1.11% | 44,335 | 0.98% | 33,551 | 0.8% |
| East | 24,284 | 0.38% | 18,213 | 0.31% | 13,365 | 0.25% |
| Yorkshire and the Humber | 24,034 | 0.44% | 22,179 | 0.42% | 18,711 | 0.38% |
| North West | 11,862 | 0.16% | 8,857 | 0.13% | 6,487 | 0.1% |
| South West | 7,465 | 0.13% | 5,892 | 0.11% | 4,614 | 0.09% |
| North East | 7,206 | 0.27% | 5,964 | 0.23% | 4,780 | 0.19% |
| England | 520,092 | 0.92% | 420,196 | 0.79% | 327,343 | 0.63% |

=== National and Ethnic Origins ===
Between 2001 and 2011, the proportion of English Sikhs who identified as Indian declined from 91.6% to 74.0%, while the proportion of English Sikhs who identified as "Other Asian" rose from 4.6% to 12.0% and the proportion of English Sikhs who identified as "Other Ethnic group" rose from 0.7% to 9.5%.

English Sikhs by National and Ethnic Origins
| | 2001 | | 2011 | | 2021 | |
| | Number | % | Number | % | Number | % |
| Asian | 315,144 | 96.27% | 366,033 | 87.11% | 422,906 | 85.16% |
| – Indian | 299,717 | 91.56% | 310,845 | 73.98% | 383,954 | 73.82% |
| – Pakistani | 343 | 0.1% | 3,268 | 0.78% | 585 | 0.11% |
| – Chinese | 76 | 0.02% | 1,000 | 0.24% | 85 | 0.02% |
| – Bangladeshi | 112 | 0.03% | 657 | 0.16% | 174 | 0.03% |
| – Other Asian | 14,896 | 4.55% | 50,263 | 11.96% | 38,108 | 7.33% |
| White | 6,625 | 2.02% | 7,232 | 1.72% | 3,269 | 0.63% |
| – British | 5,953 | 1.82% | 5,220 | 1.24% | 2,479 | 0.48% |
| – Irish | 146 | 0.04% | 147 | 0.03% | 70 | 0.01% |
| – Irish Traveller | | | 89 | 0.02% | 82 | 0.02% |
| – Roma | | | | | 42 | 0.01% |
| – Other White | 526 | 0.16% | 1,776 | 0.42% | 596 | 0.11% |
| Mixed | 2,722 | 0.83% | 5,025 | 1.2% | 6,906 | 1.33% |
| – White and Asian | 2,083 | 0.64% | 3,768 | 0.9% | 5,516 | 1.06% |
| – White and Black Caribbean | 63 | 0.02% | 269 | 0.06% | 102 | 0.02% |
| – White and Black African | 30 | 0.01% | 104 | 0.02% | 51 | 0.01% |
| – Other Mixed | 546 | 0.17% | 884 | 0.21% | 1,237 | 0.24% |
| Black | 614 | 0.19% | 1,426 | 0.34% | 300 | 0.06% |
| – African | 408 | 0.12% | 553 | 0.13% | 139 | 0.03% |
| – Caribbean | 140 | 0.04% | 347 | 0.08% | 108 | 0.02% |
| – Other Black | 66 | 0.02% | 526 | 0.13% | 53 | 0.01% |
| Arab | | | 494 | 0.12% | 80 | 0.02% |
| Other Ethnic group | 2,238 | 0.68% | 39,986 | 9.52% | 86,830 | 16.7% |
| TOTAL | 327,343 | 100% | 420,196 | 100% | | 100% |

== Sikh Schools ==
There are currently 13 Sikh Schools in England that teach the national curriculum alongside Sikh values. These schools are often oversubscribed and outperform regular schools, for example the Nishkam High School in Birmingham was recently rated by Ofsted as outstanding in every area. The Nishkam School Trust is also developing a sister school in West London, which is an area with a large Sikh community, which is due to open in September 2016.

The schools include:

- Akaal Primary School, Derby
- Atam Academy, Romford
- Falcons Primary School, Leicester
- Guru Gobind Singh Khalsa College, Chigwell
- Guru Nanak Sikh Academy, Hayes
- Khalsa Primary School, Slough
- Khalsa Primary School, Southall
- Pioneer Secondary Academy, Stoke Poges
- Nishkam Nursery & Primary School, Birmingham
- Nishkam High School, Birmingham
- Nishkam School West London, Isleworth
- Seva School, Coventry
- The Khalsa Academy, Wolverhampton

== Gurdwaras ==
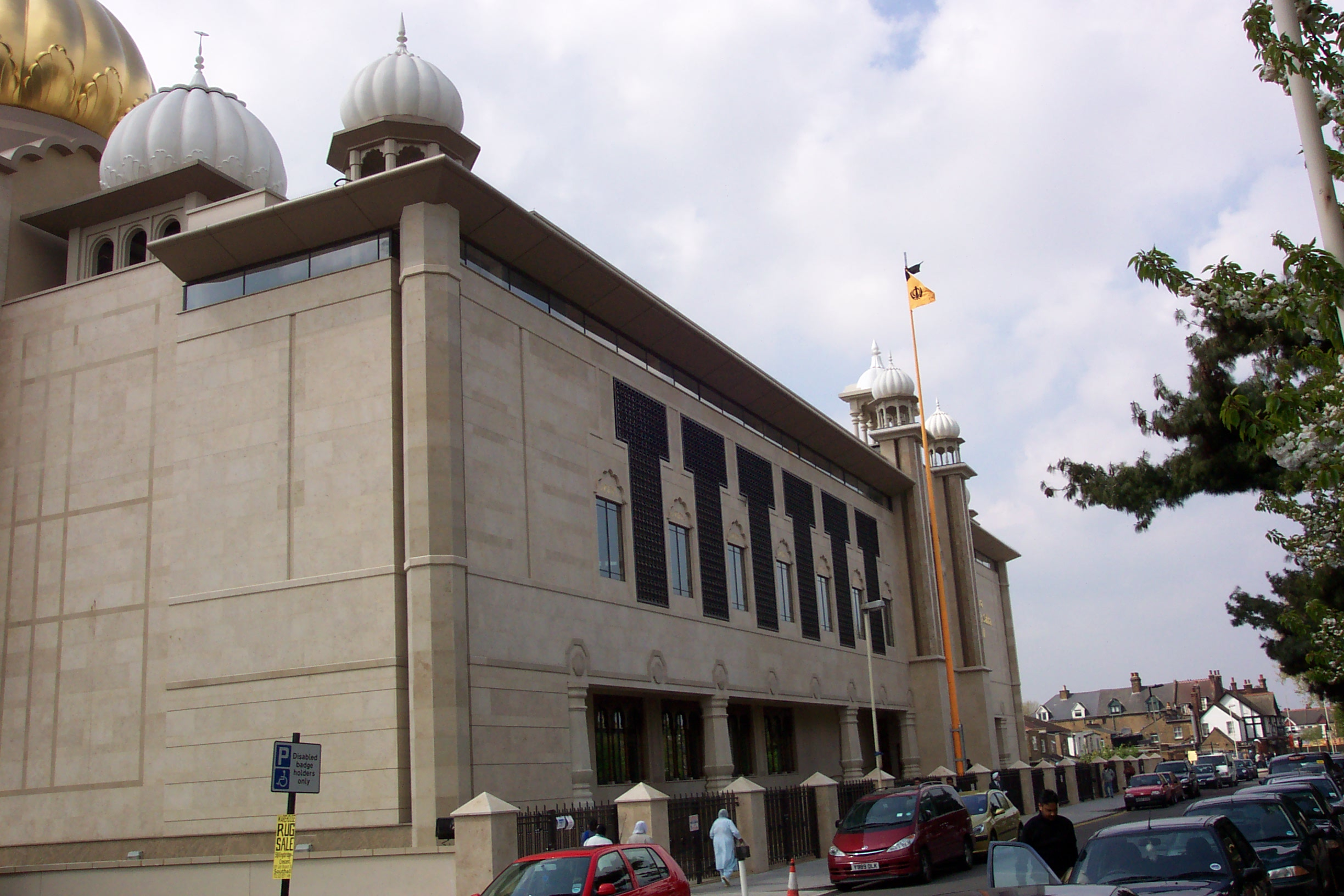
Gurdwara Sri Guru Singh Sabha, Southall, London.

Southall, in London, is home to the largest Sikh temple outside India, known as Gurdwara Sri Guru Singh Sabha. It opened in 2003 after almost three years construction and a cost of £17 million. Another large Gurdwara in Gravesend began construction in 2001, and was officially opened in November 2010 . In Sunderland, a former Church of England church has been transformed into a Sikh Gurdwara by the Sunderland Sikh Association.

Many cities, especially those with large Sikh communities, now have several Gurdwaras to cater to their growing congregations. For example, Bradford is a city that now has 6 Gurdwaras. Many Gurdwaras will have had other uses and have been converted from industrial buildings to even former churches that have closed down. Increasingly, Gurdwaras are being purposely built, The Guru Gobind Singh Gurdwara in Bradford is an example of a purpose-built Gurdwara.

== Notable British Sikh organisations ==
In addition to Gurdwaras there are now a variety of additional organisations which have been setup by Sikhs to support the community:

- British Sikh Report
- City Sikhs
- Gurdwara Sahib Leamington and Warwick
- Guru Nanak Nishkam Sevak Jatha
- Gurdwara Sri Guru Singh Sabha Southall
- Guru Nanak Gurdwara Smethwick
- Guru Nanak Darbar Gurdwara
- Nishkam SWAT
- Sangat TV
- Sikh Pioneers & Sikh Light Infantry Association UK
- Sikh Channel
- Sikh Federation (UK)
- The Sikh Awards

== Sikh Media ==
Sikhs in England have managed to establish a range of media outlets to propagate and encourage dialogue between Sikhs across the country, predominantly in Punjabi, although increasingly media is produced in English to include the new generation. Many Sikhs still speak Punjabi as a first and second language. In England there are currently no less than 4 Sky channels including, Sikh Channel, Sikh TV, Akaal Channel and Sangat TV, all are also broadcast worldwide and on the internet. There are now also radio stations, which broadcast Gurbani at different times during the morning and evening hours.

In radio there are numerous stations broadcast on analogue in areas with large Sikh communities as well as internationally on the Sky platform, since 2001 Sukh Sagar on Sky channel 0150 is one such station that was also the world's first 24-hour Gurbani (Sikh prayer) radio station.

== See also ==
- List of British Sikhs
- Sikhism in the United Kingdom
- Sikhism in Scotland
- Sikhism in Wales
- Religion in England
- Gurdwaras in England
