= BBC News Punjabi =

- Native name: BBC News ਪੰਜਾਬੀ
- Website type: Online newspaper
- Available in: Punjabi (Gurmukhi)
- Parent: BBC World Service
- Website: www.bbc.com/punjabi
- IPv6 support: No
- Launched: 2 October 2017; 8 years ago

BBC Punjabi (in Punjabi: ਬੀਬੀਸੀ ਪੰਜਾਬੀ (Gurmukhi), بی بی سی پنجابی (Shahmukhi)) or BBC News Punjabi is an international news service in the Punjabi language. It was started on 2 October 2017. The service is on websites and social networking sites. The launch is part of the World Service's biggest expansion since the 1940s, following a government funding boost announced in 2016.

== Coverage area ==
Former BBC News Punjabi logo.

Target audiences are Punjabis from India, Pakistan and other western countries with significant Punjabi population like Canada, the United Kingdom, and Australia. According to BBC's official website, Punjabi is spoken by 100 million people, making it the 11th most used language in the world.

== See also ==
- List of Punjabi media
- List of Punjabi-language television channels
