= Barjinder Singh Hamdard =

Indian newspaper editor

Barjinder Singh Hamdard is the managing editor of the Punjabi newspaper Daily Ajit and he is also an ex-parliamentarian of India's upper house, Rajya Sabha. He is the son of famous Punjabi journalist and writer Sadhu Singh Hamdard.

== Punjabi politics ==
Hamdard led a coalition in opposition to Amarinder Singh after Singh took office and withdrew government advertising from Ajit newspapers.
