= Khyber Mail =

Khyber Mail may refer to:

- Khyber Mail (passenger train), a train service in Pakistan
- Khyber Mail (newspaper), an English language newspaper in Peshawar, Pakistan
