= Sajjan =

Sajjan may refer to:

- Sajjan (newspaper), a Punjabi newspaper published in Lahore, Punjab, Pakistan
- Sajjan (actor) (1921–2000), Bollywood and stage actor
- Harjit Sajjan (b. 1970), Canadian Minister of Defence under Prime Minister Justin Trudeau

== See also ==
- Sajan (disambiguation)
