= Sajni =

Sajni or Sajani may refer to:

- Sajni (film), a 2007 Indian Kannada-language film
- Sajni (album), a music album by Shaban Yusuf
- "Sajni" (song), by Arijit Singh from the 2023 Indian film Laapataa Ladies
- Sajani (1940 film), an Indian Hindi-language social film
- Sajani (2004 film), an Indian Bengali-language film

== See also ==
- Sajan (disambiguation)
