= List of Punjabi-language television channels =

Punjabi-language television channels

This is a list of channels broadcast in Punjabi language.

== Government owned channel ==
- DD Punjabi

== General entertainment ==
- PTC Punjabi
- Zee Punjabi
- GTC Punjabi

== Movies ==
- Manoranjan Movies
- Pitaara TV

== News ==
- ABP Sanjha
- Chaupal TV
- News18 Punjab
- PTC News
- Zee Punjab Haryana Himachal

== Music ==
- 9X Tashan

== Religious ==
- Akaali Channel
- Sangat di maa di TV
- Sikho app personal Channel

== See also ==
- List of Punjabi media
- List of Punjabi-language newspapers
