= Zia Shahid =

Pakistani journalist (1945–2021)

- Born: 4 January 1945
- Died: 12 April 2021 (aged 76); Lahore, Pakistan
- Occupations: Journalist, Editor-in-Chief of a newspaper
- Employer: Liberty Papers Private Ltd
- Known for: Roznama Khabrain, Channel Five
- Awards: Sitara-i-Imtiaz (2007)

Zia Shahid (4 January 1945 – 12 April 2021) was a Pakistani journalist. He was the editor-in-chief of Channel Five and a daily newspaper Roznama Khabrain, two prominent Urdu language news media organizations in Pakistan.

Additionally, he was the proprietor of Liberty Papers Private Ltd, which owned a TV station and produced a number of daily newspapers.

It is proclaimed by colleagues of Zia Shahid that he enjoyed bad reputation as "Evil Genius" as a manager/Head of Department, he was involved to deliberately delaying salaries of lower staff, he was involved in immoral activities with his lady secretaries in office. He was also involved in Journalism malpractices. He founded the newspaper Khabrain in 1992. He belonged to an Arain family of Punjab.

Shahid maintained business relationships with numerous magazines during his career, developing a reputation as an experienced journalist. He participated in influencing public opinion and reported on several political eras in Pakistan.

== Death and legacy ==
Shahid spent the last two weeks of his life receiving treatment at Shaikh Zayed Hospital for a cardiac condition. In addition, he had various diseases including kidney issues. The founder of Minhaj-ul-Quran, Tahirul Qadri, and the previous Federal Minister for Science and Technology, Fawad Chaudhry, both expressed their sadness and offered prayers for the soul of the deceased. Shahid's contributions to press freedom were praised by Senate Chairman Sadiq Sanjrani. On April 13, 2021, prayers for his funeral were performed at N-Block Ground in Model Town, Lahore.

== Awards and honours ==
- Sitara-i-Imtiaz (Star of Excellence) award by the President of Pakistan in 2007 for his contributions to journalism.
