= Daily Punjab Times =

- Type: Daily newspaper
- Format: Broadsheet
- Owner: PT Live Private Limited
- Editor-in-chief: Baljit Singh Brar
- Political alignment: Neutral
- Language: Punjabi language
- Headquarters: 503, GTB Nagar, Jalandhar 144003 East Punjab, India)
- Website: www.dailypunjabtimes.com

Daily Punjab Times is an Indian Punjabi language daily newspaper owned by PT Live Private Limited from Jalandhar, and published in Punjab, India. Baljit Singh Brar is the editor.

== See also ==
- The Tribune
- Punjabi Tribune
- List of Punjabi-language newspapers
- List of newspapers
- List of newspapers in India by circulation
- List of newspapers in the world by circulation
