= Saidpur, Kapurthala =

Saidpur
- village
- Country: India
- State: Punjab
- District: Kapurthala
- Tehsil: Sultanpur Lodhi
- Elevation: 31.41945 m (103.0822 ft)

Languages
  - Official: Punjabi
- Time zone: UTC+5:30 (IST)
- PIN: 144628
- Vehicle registration: PB-09

Saidpur is a village in Sultanpur Lodhi Tehsil, Kapurthala district, Punjab, India, situated in the footsteps of Margalla Hills hardly at five minutes drive from the upscale neighbourhoods of the capital.

== Bhai Jwala Singh Ragi: (1892–1952) ==
Bhai Sahib Bhai Jwala Singh Ragi of SaidPur, Kapurthala. 1935 at Dera Sahib, Lahore. On the Jori is Bhai Gurcharan Singh and at about 10 years old is Bhai Avtar Singh playing the Taus. The handsome little boy is Bhai Rattan Singh, a gurbhai of Bhai Avtar Singh and a Tabla-Jori player who studied from Bhai Gurcharan Singh. Bhai Rattan Singh played Jori with Bhai Saheb Jwala Singh for the 9 days of kirtan when Mohandas Karam Chand (Mahatma) Gandhi died.

The pinnacle was his victory over the great legendary rababi Bhai Moti of Darbar Sahib Amritsar in the early 1900s. Bhai Santu played Jori with Bhai Moti and Bhai Harnam Singh of Thatha Tibba (a senior disciple of Ustad Bhai Harnam Singh of Jammu) played with him. But for the dual, they had to swap their pakhawajis to increase the level of difficulty. The competition went on for three days. He is one Kirtaniya whose name everyone took by touching their ears.

== Rubaru Restaurant ==
A fine dining restaurant in the area. Rubaru makes many types of Indian dishes and also has a big Chinese menu. It states at the main road of rcf to Goindwal sahib in the main entrance of Saidpur.

== Famous People from Saidpur ==
- Balwant Singh Thind (former Deputy-Chief Minister of Punjab, Ex Revenue/Finance Minister);
- Bhai Baldeep Singh, The Anād Foundation;
