= Bhai Baldeep Singh =

Classical and Sikh musician (born 1969)

- Born: 13 September 1969 (age 57); Chandigarh
- Education: Bachelors Degree in Arts (1988)
- Alma mater: Goveronment College of Arts Sector 11 Chandigarh
- Occupations: Exponent of Pakhawaj Jori, Luether, Gurmat & Classical music singer and player
- Relatives: Amarjeet Singh ( Father)
- Writing career
- Years active: 1989-present
- Genres: Gurbani Sangeet, Chant, Var & Drupad
- Notable works: Research on crafting rabab used at Guru times, made a documentary on Gurmat Sangeet
- Notable awards: Batan Singh Memorial Award 1997; Annual award for contribution to classical music by Delhi Goveronment 2002–2003; Award for Gaurav of Sikhi 2003; Award on Gurbani and Classical music by Goveronment of Punjab 15 ਅਗੱਸਤ 2011; Sikh Award U.K in entertainment field 2014; Certificate of Merit by Goveronmentbof Bihar 2017; Member of Punjab state Sangeet Natak Akadami 2001–03 ਤੇ 2004–2006; Punjab representative in National Sangeet Natak Akadami of India 2009–2014; Shaan-e-Khalsa 2025 by Jawaddi Taksal and Virasat Punjab Manch
- Website: anadfoundation.org

Bhai Baldeep Singh (born 1969) is a Ragi known for his Shabad Kirtan. He is a researcher and revivalist for conventional string instruments like Dhurphadi Rabab, Saranda, Tāmbūrnī (Tanpura), Dilruba used for Sikh music since Guru's Times. He is an accomplished Pakhawaj Mridang Jori player. He is the founder and chairman of Anad Foundation organisation dedicated to Sikh music. He was an unsuccessful candidate of Aam Aadmi Party in 2014 general elections for Punjab state of India.

== Early life ==
Bhai Baldeep was born to his parents Amarjeet Singh and Sukhjit Kaur in a respectable family of Sikh musicians at Chandigarh on 13 September 1969.He passed Fifth Standard from Airforce school Vadodara Gujrat and Matriculation from Goveronment Model High School, sector 32 Chandigarh in 1984.He was a leading cadet in NCC aero wing of school who took part in Republic Day Parade of 1987 at Delhi as one of three parade commanders and was even selected in SSB interview after matriculation. He was also adjudged as best aero modeller at Punjab (combined Punjab, Haryana, Himachal and Chandigarh) directorate of NCC, Patiala

== Inheritance and early Gurbani Kirtan learning ==
Being a child of a family of well versed in Sikh musical traditions, he was initiated to learning kirtan since age 5 by his mother Sukhjit Kaur. Then learning of Tabla playing came from Air Force station gurdwara Granthi in 1976.All this was happening to him as he was great-grandchild of Bhai Narain Singh who was himself a kirataniya and elder brother of reputed Bhai Jawala Singh Ragi In turn Bhai Jawala Singh and Narain Singh were tenth generation of their ancestors Bhai Sadharan jee (who was architect at Baoli sahib Goindwal at times of Guru Amardas), after them came in lineage Bhai Sahib Singh (a Sikh of Guru Gobind Singh), Bhai Mehtab Singh his son Bhai Tehal Singh (a kirtaniya of panch shabdee Aasa ki Var bani since sunset to early morning sunrise), further his son Bhai Deva Singh (d 1894) father of Baba Jawala Singh (1872–1952) who had two sons as accomplished ragis Bhai Avtar Singh and Gurcharan Singh, grand uncles of Bhai Baldeep Singh, and other son of Deva Singh Bhai Narain singh (1856–1906) whose son Giani Bhagat Singh (1897–1906) grand father of Bhai Baldeep singh 13th generation exponent of great family was.

== Occupation ==
Instead of choosing his bright career in aero modelling after initial studies, he preferred to dedicate his life for study of difficult and well developed heritage of Gurbani Kirtan and Sikh music.

== Research for traditional compositions of Gurbani Kirtan & into the making of traditional string instruments. ==
During 1987–2005, Bhai Baldeep conducted a comprehensive research mission across Punjab and Pakistan with the aim of gaining access to the Gurbani kirtan tradition by reaching out to the old ragis of the time and retrieving its links. He retrieved musical compositions of Gurbani Shabads left out and remaining at that time in oral tradition, revived intricacies in playing percussion instrument Pakhawaj Jori. He also succeeded in exposing the peacock based stringed instrument Taus which was in vogue for Gurbani singing initiated by Guru Hargobind. He was successful to approach Giani Harbhajan Singh an elderly luthier (1920–2005), who possessed profound knowledge of playing and making traditional string instruments like Taus, Saranda, Rabab, Dilruba etc. used for Gurbani Kirtan and Indian classical music and reviving his Luthiery techniques for learning and making these instruments himself. Giani Harbhajan Singh Mistry even handed over the reins of his young grandson Parminder Singh Bumrah to Baldeep Singh, who later became a major string instrument luthier and Mridangam Pakhavaj player.

== Achievements and rewards ==
Bhai Baldeep Singh learned playing Mirdang (jori, tabla), Pakhawaj, according to the Guru Chela tradition from Ustad Arjan Singh Tarangar, an expert musician of Jodi and Mirdang. He perfected this art so much that he received the turban /achieved headship of Amritsari Baj tradition being continued from Bhai Maiya Singh in this art. He revived this gharana of Pakhawaj also known as Nayian da gharana or more recently Punjab Gharana. He also perfected his learning of Gurbani and Gurmat Sangeet from his grand uncle Bhai Gurcharan Singh Ragi. Additionally he mastered technique of making traditional string instruments like rabab, saranda, tambura, dilruba etc. Bhai Baldeep is not only engaged in the research of traditional string instruments of the Guru period, but has succeeded in reviving these instruments in service of Gurbani Sangeet,.

He is founder and chairman of Anad conservatory of classical style of kirtan. He has trained several Indian and western musicians in this art. To name a few Nirinjan Kaur Khalsa and Francesca Cassio are his well acclaimed students.

Besides he has organized many music concerts in India as well as abroad in North America, Europe, Southeast Asia and Australia and gave performances for his singing and playing.

He has been an expert and visiting professor of Gurbani Sangeet, at Hofstra University, USA.
