= Nawai Watan =

Pakistani Newspaper

Nawai Watan (Balochi: روتاک نوائے وطن) is a Balochi-language newspaper published in Quetta, Balochistan, Pakistan. It is mainly distributed in Quetta with a limited circulation.

== See also ==
- List of newspapers in Pakistan
