= Sajan =

Sajan may refer to:

- Sajan (director), Indian director of Malayalam movies
- Sajan (Kikinda), a village in Vojvodina, Serbia
- Sajan (1947 film), 1947 Indian film
- Sajan (1969 film), Indian Hindi-language film, debut of actor Shatrughan Sinha
- Saajan, 1991 Indian film by Lawrence D'Souza
- Sajan, byname of Indian politician Sunil Singh Yadav

== See also ==
- Sajjan (disambiguation)
- Sajni (disambiguation)
