= Balwant Singh Thind =

Indian politician

Balwant Singh was a leader of Shiromani Akali Dal. He was deputy chief minister and finance minister of Punjab, India. He was killed by Sikh militants in July 1990.

== Personal life ==
Thind was born in 1929, in the village of Saidpur, Kapurthala. He started his political career as a member of the congress party and after losing his first election succeeded in getting elected in 1962.He later joined the Akali Dal.He has been minister of finance. His family lives in Chandigarh.He has 1 son and 2 grandchildren.
