= Millat =

Pakistani newspaper

Millat (Gujarati: મિલ્લત, Urdu: ملت) or Daily Millat is a bilingual Gujarati and Urdu daily founded in 1948 by Fakhre Matri and based in Karachi, Sindh, Pakistan. After him his son Inquilab Matri managed the newspaper. It is edited by Shumaila Matri Daud.

It is one of the two Gujarati newspapers published from Karachi; other is Watan.

== Editor-in-chiefs ==
- Fakhre Matri (1948–1966)
- Inquilab Matri (1966–2010)
- Shumaila Matri (2010–present)

== See also ==
- List of newspapers in Pakistan
