= Al Akhbar (Pakistan) =

Pakistani Newspaper

Al Akhbar (Urdu: روزنامہ الاخبار) is an Urdu daily newspaper in Pakistan. The newspaper is published from Islamabad, with an edition published in Muzaffarabad as well. As of 2004 Ghulam Akbar was the editor of the newspaper.

== See also ==
- List of newspapers in Pakistan
