= Daily Hilal Pakistan =

Pakistani Newspaper

ہِلال پاکِستان
- Type: Daily newspaper
- Format: Broadsheet
- Founded: 1946
- Language: Sindhi
- Headquarters: Karachi, Pakistan
- Website: www.dailyhilal.com.pk

Daily Hilal-e-Pakistan (Sindhi: روزانہ ہِلال پاکِستان) is a Sindhi-language daily newspaper in Pakistan. It was founded in Hyderabad, Sindh.

== History ==
The Daily Hilal started publishing in 1946, making it the oldest running newspaper of Pakistan. It has been notable for its role in supporting the concept of Pakistan. It also distinguishes itself as one of the rare Sindhi newspapers with additional offices in Islamabad and Lahore.

The newspaper is one of 11 dailies published in the Sindhi language in Karachi. It is a member of the All Pakistan Newspaper Society and ABC certified.

== See also ==
- Daily Kawish
- Daily Awami Awaz
- List of newspapers in Pakistan
