= Ravi Singh (businessman) =

American politician and businessman (born 1972)

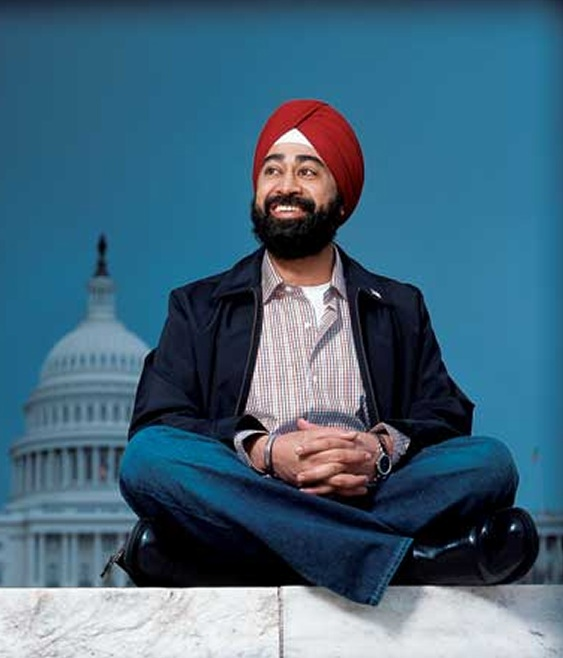
- Born: 1972 (age 53–54); Aurora, Illinois, U.S.
- Education: Doctoral specializing in social media & technology Master of Science in Social Media Management Masters of Arts in Political Science; Bachelor of Science Honorary MIT Alumni (Sloan Business ACE Program)
- Alma mater: Northwestern University; Valparaiso University
- Known for: First Asian candidate for Illinois Legislature; Founder of ElectionMall Technologies; Fought conviction of illegally influencing San Diego mayoral campaign and bribery for 8 years
- Notable work: Twitterism: Raise Your Voice a scientific study of @RealDonaldTrump's Tweets. Leadership By Turban: An American Dream
- Political party: Republican
- Awards: 2010 Sikh in Media Award; 2010 Outstanding 50 Asian Americans in Business; 2007 Campaigns & Elections Magazine Rising Star
- Website: www.ravisingh.com

Ravi Singh (born 1972) is a Sikh American entrepreneur, author, and the first turban wearing, US military cadet (ARMY), a conservative (Republican) candidate for Illinois State Representative politician who fought conviction of 3 felony for eight (8) years regarding US Federal counts relating to a California State, San Diego mayoral election, and fought to wear his turban even in US Federal Prison during his 120 Days incarceration. He was the founder and CEO of Electionmall Technologies, a non-partisan marketing company that offers technology products and services tailored to those running for political office, and co-branded with Microsoft the first cloud based software, Campaign Cloud invented by him. Singh became known as the first U.S. cadet to graduate from a military academy with a turban. His 1998 bid for the Illinois Legislature made him the first Asian to ever run for the position. Singh has been honored with numerous awards and recognitions including the Sikh in Media Award in 2011, and a Rising Star, a prestigious honor given in politics.

== Early life and education ==
Singh was born and raised in Aurora, Illinois, to U.S. immigrant parents who came to the United States from India in the 1960s. He was raised in Sikh faith, in which wearing a turban and full beard are basic religious constituents.

At the age of 14, Singh attended Marmion Military Academy in Aurora, Illinois where he was not allowed to wear his turban. Singh was allowed to wear his turban but was not allowed to participate in Army drills with his turban. He was expelled from the military school after he refused to remove his turban. Singh's parents went to U.S. Representative J. Dennis Hastert, to draft legislation where discrimination based on turbans would be declared illegal. He then graduated from Marmion Military Academy in 1990. Shortly after entering the academy, co-sponsored legislation introduced by Senator Paul Simon and Congressman Dennis Hastert and later signed by President Ronald Reagan, allowed him to graduate with his turban. His mother fought for the legislation which also allowed Jews to wear religious headdress while attending military academies.

Singh attended Valparaiso University, a Lutheran university located in Valparaiso, Indiana. Singh got his Bachelor of Science degree from Valparaiso University, where he was elected to be the first Sikh-American student body president. During his time as student body president, he spoke at the 1993 Parliament of the World's Religions in Chicago. He went on to Northwestern University where he earned his master's degree in Political science in 1995 and he completed his second master's degree at Liberty University in 2019.

He completed his master's degree in Political Science in nine months and wrote a dissertation on Asian American political participation and talked about the challenges that Sikh-Americans had to deal with by being mislabeled and by not being considered Asian-Americans. In 2019, Singh acquired his PhD in social media and technology from Ashford University and finished his studies at MIT, Duke, and Harvard in digital marketing and leadership programs.

== Political career ==
After graduating from Northwestern, he worked as a legislative assistant to then Illinois Lt Governor Bob Kustra. A year later he went to work for Illinois State Treasurer Judy Baar Topinka and served as liaison to the Asian Pacific American community. In 1997, at 25, he ran for the State Legislature for the Illinois' 42nd Assembly District. The district's population was only 2% Asian-American at the time. Singh gained the support of the owner of the local Domino's Pizza restaurant. Singh lost the election and attributes the loss partially to his refusal to remove his turban during the campaign. He was quoted in the Outlook Magazine as stating, "if I do that, I will not be true to my faith and my work…If I give up my identity and values, I'll not be Asian or an American. I'll be nobody." Even though he did not win the elections, he landed on the position of administrative assistant for the Illinois Lt. Governor and State Treasurer.

Singh was a member of EAPC (European), the AAPC (American) and one of the youngest board members on the Associations of Political Consultants, and IAPC (International), where he is part of the board members. He has published articles for George Washington University, and these revolve around Campaign Relationship Management and Voter Space.

He has served as a technology adviser for Nobel Prize Winner Juan Manuel Santos, the former Colombian President. He was invited to the 10th annual Art and Science of Public Affairs conference to discuss U.S politics. He has also served as an advisor to Enda Kenny, Prime Minister of Ireland (Center right candidate), and has assisted over 9 heads of states get elected using his software.

== Tech entrepreneur ==
In 2000, Singh founded ElectionMall™ Technologies, Inc., a non-partisan technology company headquartered in Washington, D.C. It was the first company in the industry to send a unique electronic card over the Internet known as eYardSigns. The company has campaigned for George W. Bush and the Democratic National Committee in Presidential Campaign in 2000.

Singh has expanded his company in Latin America, Asia, and Europe. The company also acquired sponsorship funds from Microsoft and together created Campaign Cloud. Singh successfully co-branded the first cloud based political software, Campaign Cloud, powered by Microsoft, is a campaign dashboard for all types of campaigns that use advanced cloud computing technologies.

In 2007, nearly 640 campaigners signed up with the company. ElectionMall™ has an international patent and was the first to introduce digital certificates in elections.

== Election influence and criminal conviction ==
Singh founded ElectionMall Technologies in 1999. He realized after his loss in the Illinois State Legislature election that there was no company offering candidates any type of technology solution for fighting campaigns digitally. In a 2004 cover story for USA Weekend, Singh was quoted as saying, "we want the mother running for school board to have the same tools as a senator."

ElectionMall, founded in 1999 a non-partisan campaign technology company in Washington, D.C., hit the headlines when a criminal complaint against its Founder and CEO Singh was unsealed, revealing that the Justice Department had charged him with illegally helping a foreigner to influence the election process in San Diego during the 2012 and 2013 election cycles through an independent political action committee. Singh was arrested 17 January 2014, and released on bail four days later. On 9 September 2016, a Federal Jury found Singh guilty on 4 felony counts related to a conspiracy to make contributions in a U.S. election on behalf of a foreign national. He later appealed the case to the Appellate court but still sentenced 12 months in USA federal prisons day the 1 main felony charge was overturned. He was sentenced to 12 months in prison and was quoted as saying "I've always wanted to serve my country, now I can't even vote" ElectionMall has closed operations since December 2016 due to the ongoing cost of the litigation.

== Personal life ==
Singh is a practicing Sikh. Singh is a resident of Aurora, Illinois. He is a member of the Chicago area Sikh community.

== See also ==
- Asian Americans in government and politics
- Sikhism in the United States
