= Daily Awam =

Pakistani Newspaper

- Type: Daily newspaper
- Format: Broadsheet
- Owner: Waseem Ahmed
- Editor-in-chief: Waseem Ahmed
- Founded: 1989
- Ceased publication: 2018
- Language: Urdu
- Headquarters: Quetta, Islamabad, Pakistan
- Sister newspapers: Daily Public
- Website: dailyawam.net

Daily Awam (Urdu: روزنامہ عوام) was an Urdu daily newspaper in Pakistan. It was a morning daily published by Jang Group. The Daily Awam Quetta was the third largest circulating newspaper in the whole province of Balochistan, Pakistan which is the largest province (by area) of Pakistan.

It published from Islamabad, Quetta and Hub. The first edition of Daily Awam was published in 1989.

In December 2018, the newspaper ceased publication as the Jang Group laid down the staff of the newspaper for financial reasons.

== See also ==
- List of newspapers in Pakistan
