= Harjinder Singh Dilgeer =

Indian historian

Harjinder Singh Dilgeer, Dr (Punjabi: ਹਰਜਿੰਦਰ ਸਿੰਘ ਦਿਲਗੀਰ, born 22 October 1965 ) is an eminent historian and author of more than 60 books on the history of the Sikhs and Punjab.

Dilgeer has translated Guru Granth Sahib in English. He has written about the concept and history of Akal Takht Sahib, Sikh culture, Shiromani Akali Dal, the history of Anandpur Sahib, Kiratpur Sahib, etc.

The Sikh Reference Book is his magnum opus. The Sikh Reference Book is an encyclopedia consisting of more than 2400 biographies, a chronology of Sikh history, 400 concepts of Sikh philosophy, and 800 Sikh shrines. He has produced a Sikh Encyclopedia CD-ROM. Dr Dilgeer's greatest work is "Navan Te Vadda Mahan Kosh" which is more than an encyclopedia. It runs through 2748 big-size pages with more than one hundred thousand entries about the language, literature, culture, and history of the Sikhs and Punjab. This is perhaps the only book in Punjabi that gives the Prakrit, Apbhranash, and Pali roots of hundreds of Punjabi words. This has been considered the most important book of the previous 100 years. Dilgeer has also published books about the history and archeology of the Punjab which include Encyclopedia of Jalandhar, Amritsar & Darbar Sahib, and Heritage of the Punjab. His latest production is encyclopaedic work SIKH HISTORICAL SHRINES (History, street maps and coloured photographs of all the (more than 900) historical Gurdwaras of India, Pakistan, Afghanistan, Bangladesh, Nepal, Sri Lanka etc))

== Early life ==
Dilgeer was born on 22 October 1965, in Jalandhar in Punjab, India, into a Sikh family to parents Gurbakhsh Singh and Jagtar Kaur. in a family originally from Jaisalmer, in Rajasthan, then Mehraj village (now in Bathinda district). He was later based in Jalandhar and Jalalabad (Firozpur), and finally in Oslo. He is a citizen of Norway, and, presently lives in England.

== Education and career ==
Dilgeer passed his M.A. in English, Punjabi, Philosophy, and History. He was awarded the degrees of Master of Philosophy (M.Phil), Bachelor of Laws, and PhD by Panjab University Chandigarh. He has passed the degree of Adi Granth Acharya.

He started teaching in various colleges in Punjab and finally at Panjab University Chandigarh. He has been a visiting teacher at the Punjabi University Patiala. He has been teaching in Canada and England also. He has been Director of the Sikh History Research Board as well as the Sikh Reference Library (SGPC). He is a former director of the Guru Nanak Institute of Sikh Studies. Currently, he is the Director of Guru Nanak Research Institute (Birmingham, England). He is the Editor-in-Chief of "The Sikhs: Past & Present".

He has been the editor of the newspapers The Punjab Times (London) and The Sikh Times (Birmingham). He is also the Director of the website thesikhs.org.

== Awards ==
In Denmark in 1995, he was presented with the Shan-i-Punjab award; in 2004, he was given the Giani Garja Singh Award in Ludhiana; in 2005, he was presented with the Kohinoor Award, the National Professor of Sikh Studies award and a gold medal in Birmingham (England); and in 2006 he was given the Bhai Gurdas award in Amritsar. In 2009, he was presented with the National Professor of Sikh History award at Chandigarh. In 2014, he was awarded a gold medal in Toronto. He was given the award of "Heera-e-Qaum" (Panth Ratan) by the Haryana SGPC on 11 November 2017.
