= Manika Kaur =

Australian musician

- Born: Melbourne, Australia
- Genres: Religious, Kirtan, Spiritual, Yoga, New Age
- Occupations: Singer, songwriter and philanthropist
- Years active: 2012–present
- Labels: Shemaroo Entertainment, Invincible Recording, United Sound Recordings, Suriya Recordings and Six Degrees Records
- Website: www.manikakaur.com

Manika Kaur is an Australian religious singer, songwriter and philanthropist from Melbourne.

== Early life ==
Kaur was born and raised in Melbourne, Australia, to parents who were active members of the Sikh community. In 2006 she married and moved to Dubai. She currently resides in London with her three children.

== Career ==
In 2012, Kaur released a music video for her song "Guru Ram Das Rakho Sarnaee", telling the life story of Guru Ram Das through shadow puppets and hand shadowgraph by Amar Sen.

=== Bandhanaa (re-released as Satnam Waheguru) ===
Kaur's debut album, Bandhanaa, was released in 2008 by Shemaroo Entertainment. The album was produced by Sukhbir Singh. In 2014, the album was re-mixed and re-released as Satanam Waheguru by Invincible Recordings.

=== I Bow To You Waheguru ===
In 2015, Kaur's second album was released by United Sound Recordings through Proper Music Distribution. Its title track, "I Bow to You Waheguru", was produced by Talvin Singh.

The album features collaborations with Rakesh Chaurasia, Jyotsna Srikanth, Soumik Datta, Bernhard Schimpelsberger, and Reiner Erlings. She performed material from the album on the Sikh Channel, BBC London, and ABC Australia TV.

=== Sacred Words ===
Kaur's third album, Sacred Words, was released in 2018 on Martin 'Youth' Glover's label Suriya Recordings and was released in the US on imprint label partner Six Degrees Records. It features collaborations with Scottish folk musician James Yorkston, Jyotsna Srikanth (violin), and Tunde Jegede.

=== EK ===
Manika Kaur's fourth album, EK, was released in 2021. It was produced by Oskar Vizan and Vinod Gadher and incorporates themes influenced by Sikh teachings. The album combines traditional Sikh kirtan with elements of world music. Contributing artists include Jyotsna Srikanth, Jesse Bannister, Soumik Datta, Kirpal Panesar, Suhail Yusuf Khan, and Sanjeev Shankar.

=== Yoga Ambient (remixes) ===
Released in 2020, Yoga Ambient (remixes) features reinterpretations of Kaur's previous works by producer Martin "Youth" Glover. The album blends kirtan vocals with ambient and downtempo electronic styles and is intended to complement activities such as yoga and meditation.

=== Journey (The Ambient Remixes) ===
Also released in 2020, Journey (The Ambient Remixes) includes remixed versions of Manika Kaur's devotional music, produced by Martin "Youth" Glover. The album integrates ambient and electronic sounds while maintaining the spiritual nature of the original compositions.

== Discography ==
Year	Album or non-album single	Featured artist(s)	Composer(s)	Label
2008	Bandhanaa			Shemaroo Entertainment
2014	Satanam Waheguru			Invincible Recording
2015	I Bow To You Waheguru	Rakesh Chaurasia, Jyotsna Srikanth, Soumik Datta, Bernhard Schimpelsberger, and Reiner Erlings	Talvin Singh	United Sound Recordings
2018	"Aval Allah" (single)	feat. James Yorkston		Manika Music
2018	Sacred Words	James Yorkston, Jyotsna Srikanth (violin), and Tunde Jegede	Talvin Singh, Tigerstyle, and Oskar Vizan	Suriya Recordings
2018	"Tu Sultan" (single)	feat. James Yorkston		Manika Music
2020	Yoga Ambient (Remixes)	Rakesh Chaurasia, Jyotsna Srikanth, Soumik Datta, Bernhard Schimpelsberger, and Reiner Erlings	Manika Kaur	Six Degrees Records
2020	Harbour of Inner Lights	Rakesh Chaurasia, Jyotsna Srikanth, Soumik Datta, Bernhard Schimpelsberger, and Reiner Erlings	Manika Kaur	Six Degrees Records
2021	Magic Mantra (single)	Jyotsna Srikanth	Manika Kaur	United Sound Recordings
2021	Diwali Di Raat (single)	Jyotsna Srikanth	Manika Kaur	United Sound Recordings
2022	Mool Mantra Extended Version (single)	Talvin Singh	Manika Kaur	United Sound Recordings
2022	Waheguru the Journey Simraan Extended Version (single)		Manika Kaur	United Sound Recordings
2024	Pavan Meh (single)	Rakesh Chaurasia	Manika Kaur	United Sound Recordings
2025	Siddhartha (Radio Edit single)	Martin Glover	Manika Kaur	Six Degrees Records
2025	Wakan Tanka (Radio Edit single)	John Thorpe	Manika Kaur	Six Degrees Records
2025	Devocean	Martin Glover, Roopa Panesar, Giuliano Modarelli, Jesse Bannister, Kabiraj Singh, Sukhvinder Barj, Michael Rendall	Manika Kaur	Six Degrees Records

== Philanthropy ==
Through her foundation Kirtan for Causes, Kaur raises awareness for issues such as equality, global access to feminine hygiene products, and education of females of all ages around the world.

Her foundation currently supports the education of 100 programme participants and supports the education of over 200 children. Kaur raised over one million dirhams (approx. £210,000) through her first album, which she donated to finance a new Gurdwara (Sikh temple) in Dubai. All of the revenue from Kaur's work go to support her charity.

== Awards ==
Kaur won the 2016 Sikh Award for Sikhs in Entertainment and placed sacred Sikh vocal music and Kirtan in the World Music Charts Europe for the first time.
