= Bhulekha =

Daily newspaper in Pakistan

Daily Bhulekha
- Type: Daily newspaper
- Format: Print, online
- Owner: Mudasssar Iqbal Butt
- Founded: 24 May 1989
- Language: Punjabi

Bhulekha (Punjabi: روزانہ بھلیکھا) is a Punjabi daily newspaper in Pakistan. Bhulekha is currently publishing from seven stations in Pakistan alongside eveninger Punjabi Zuban and Lokaai. Bilal Mudassar Butt is the editor of Bhulekha. Mudasssar Iqbal Butt is the CEO and publisher of Bhulekha. Bhulekha are Worldwide reporters, Imran Choudhry reporter's for France and Europe, M. Kamal for Australia and New Zealand, M. Khowaja and Rafiq Ahmed for the United States.

== See also ==
- List of newspapers in Pakistan
- List of Punjabi-language newspapers
