= The Sikh Awards =

Sikh Award
- Current: 13th Sikh Awards
- The Sikh Awards logo
- First award: October 10, 2010; 16 years ago
- Website: http://www.sikhawards.com

The Sikh Awards is an annual awards ceremony dedicated to recognising the contributions of the Sikh community to a variety of fields. The first annual Sikh Awards ceremony was held on October 10, 2010 as a tribute to the skills, achievements, and successes of the Sikh community. The event was organized by The Sikh Directory.

== The Sikh Directory ==
The Sikh Directory was published in 2006 and has since been updated and published annually. It is currently the world’s largest and most comprehensive Sikh business directory. It is an established and trusted brand which educates the next generation, stimulates community networking and connects buyers and sellers.

The Sikh Directory’s main objective is to serve, connect and unite the Sikh community around the world, to help promote and magnify the competitiveness and breadth of Sikh businesses internationally.

== Award Categories ==
The awards are given to organisations and individuals that have shown considerable commitment to their respective fields, particularly Sikhs showing outstanding delivery of service and selfless voluntary service (seva).

- Sikhs in Business

"For the organisation or individual that can best demonstrate how it has made exceptional financial returns, shown strong growth, innovative strategies and clear market leadership in its sector. This category also incorporates Business Man, Business Women and Entrepreneur awards."

- Sikhs in Charity

"For an individual, organisation, or society which can best demonstrate that it has the community at heart and has had a positive impact whilst improving the health and wellbeing of society."

- Sikhs in Education

"For any Sikh educational establishment, teacher or individual that is taking a strategic approach to recognising, educating and developing the talent and skills within the community."

- Sikhs in Entertainment

"This category recognises directors, presenters, comedians, instrumentalists and musical artists etc… respected role models who promote the Sikh identity within the entertainment industry."

- Sikhs in Media

"For an individual or organisation that has made a substantial positive impact within the media industry, including newspapers, websites, radio and television stations and all other media platforms."

- Sikhs in Profession

"Nominees in this category are employees whose contributions have made an exceptional difference on a local or global scale, in any field such as financial, medical, technology, government or legal."

- Sikhs in Seva

"This category recognises an outstanding individual who has shown exceptional vision and contribution to society through means of Seva (Selfless Voluntary Service)."

- Sikhs in Sports

"For an individual that has made a significant contribution to the sports industry on a regional, national or global scale whilst promoting their Sikh Identity."

- The Sikh Lifetime Achievement Award

"For a Sikh who has made a significant contribution to Sikhism on a global scale, an individual who has demonstrated a positive impact on society whilst progressing Sikhism to higher levels."

- The Sikh People's Choice Award

"Chosen by the community through the online voting process this category recognises an individual who has had a positive impact on people’s lives and has great admiration from others."

- The Special Recognition Award

"This highly respected honour is bestowed to a Sikh or non-Sikh that through their passion, dedication and commitment have made a significant contribution for the greater good of society."

== Previous Award Winners ==
=== 1st Awards Winners - 2010 ===
- Sikhs in Business - Kartar Lalvani - United Kingdom
- Sikhs in Business - Rabinder Buttar - United Kingdom
- Sikhs in Business - Mr Jasvinder Singh Sehmbi - United Kingdom
- Sikhs in Charity - United Sikhs - United Kingdom
- Sikhs in Education - Tejinder Virdee - United Kingdom
- Sikhs in Entertainment - Jazzy B - United Kingdom
- Sikhs in Media - The Sikh Times - United Kingdom
- Sikhs in Seva - Dr Manjit Kaur Birdi - United Kingdom
- Sikhs in Sports - Satnam Dhillon - United Kingdom
- Sikh Lifetime Achievement Award - Fauja Singh - United Kingdom
- Special Recognition Award - Bhai Sahib Dr Monhinder Singh Ji - United Kingdom

=== 2nd Awards Winners - 2011 ===
- Sikhs in Business - Analjit Singh - India
- Sikhs in Business - Mrs Geeta Kaur Sidhu - United Kingdom
- Sikhs in Business - Mr Harvinder Singh - Malaysia
- Sikhs in Charity - Sikh Aid International - United Kingdom
- Sikhs in Education - Simon Singh - United Kingdom
- Sikhs in Entertainment - Gurmeet Kaur Sodhi - United States
- Sikhs in Media - Ravi Singh - United States
- Sikhs in Profession - Jodishwar Singh - Switzerland
- Sikhs in Seva - Kulvinder Singh Sihra - Kenya
- Sikhs in Sports - Harbhajan Singh - India
- Sikh Lifetime Achievement Award - Prof Kartar Singh Ji - India
- Sikh People's Choice Award - Raminder Singh Ranger - United Kingdom
- Special Faith Award - Tariq Jahan - United Kingdom
- Special Recognition Award - Stephen Grosz - United Kingdom

=== 3rd Award Winners - 2012 ===
- Sikhs in Business - Rajinder Singh Baryan - Kenya
- Sikhs in Business - Mrs Sukhinder Singh - United States
- Sikhs in Business - Mr Suneet Singh Tuli - India
- Sikhs in Charity - Cancer Research UK - United Kingdom
- Sikhs in Education - Dr Jagir Singh - India
- Sikhs in Entertainment - Gurpreet Singh - India
- Sikhs in Media - Guruka Singh - United States
- Sikhs in Profession - Gurmant Grewal - Canada
- Sikhs in Seva - Surender S Khandari - Dubai
- Sikhs in Sports - Rashpal Kaur - India
- Sikh Lifetime Achievement Award - Bibi Inderjit Kaur Ji - India
- Sikh People's Choice Award - Paul Uppal - United Kingdom
- Special Recognition Award - Lakshmi Mittal - United Kingdom

=== 4th Award Winners - 2013 ===
- Sikhs in Business - Harpal Singh Saggu - India
- Sikhs in Business - Ms Harpreet Kaur - India
- Sikhs in Business - Kamalpreet Singh Virdi - United States
- Sikhs in Charity - Sikh Welfare Association - Malaysia
- Sikhs in Education - Ms Tavneet Kaur Suri - Kenya
- Sikhs in Entertainment - Prabjot Kaur Randhawa - United States
- Sikhs in Media - Harbinder Singh Sewak - United States
- Sikhs in Profession - Harminder Dua - United Kingdom
- Sikhs in Seva - Dr Sarup Singh Alag - India
- Sikhs in Sports - Avtar Singh Sohal - Kenya
- Sikh Lifetime Achievement Award - Jathedar Sant Baba Nihal Singh Ji - India
- Sikh People's Choice Award - Jatinder Singh Durhailay - United Kingdom
- Special Recognition Award - David Cameron - United Kingdom

=== 5th Award Winners - 2014 ===
- Sikhs in Business - Malvinder Mohan Singh - India
- Sikhs in Business - Mrs Parminder Kaur - Netherlands
- Sikhs in Business - Suki Singh Ghuman - United Kingdom
- Sikhs in Charity - Sikh Helpline - United Kingdom
- Sikhs in Education - Ms Gursharan Kaur Kandra - Canada
- Sikhs in Entertainment - Bhai Baldeep Singh - India
- Sikhs in Media - Sangat TV - United Kingdom
- Sikhs in Profession - Amrit Singh Uppal - Singapore
- Sikhs in Seva - Swaran Singh Gharial - Kenya
- Sikhs in Sports - Navtej Singh - India
- Sikh Lifetime Achievement Award - Tarlochan Singh - India
- Sikh People's Choice Award - Pardeep Singh Bahra - United Kingdom

=== 6th Award Winners - 2015 ===
- Sikhs in Business - Kuldip Singh Dhingra - India
- Sikhs in Business - Ms Indira Kaur Ahluwalia - United States
- Sikhs in Business - Ajinder Pal Singh - Botswana
- Sikhs in Charity - World Cancer Care - United Kingdom
- Sikhs in Education - Dr Raghbir Singh Bains - Canada
- Sikhs in Entertainment - Sardar Mohinder Singh Sarna - United States
- Sikhs in Media - Bal Samra - United Kingdom
- Sikhs in Profession - Karan Singh Bajwa - India
- Sikhs in Seva - Dr Parvinder Singh Pasricha - India
- Sikhs in Sports - Sundeep Singh Sandhu - United Kingdom
- Sikh Lifetime Achievement Award - Bibi Parkash Kaur Ji - India
- Sikh People's Choice Award - Kavanjit Singh Hayre - United Kingdom

=== 7th Award Winners - 2016 ===
- Sikhs in Business - Bob Singh Dhillon - Canada
- Sikhs in Business - Ms Kiran Singh - United Kingdom
- Sikhs in Business - Supreet Singh Manchanda - United States
- Sikhs in Charity - Khalsa Aid - UK
- Sikhs in Education - Dr Birender Singh Mahon - United Kingdom
- Sikhs in Entertainment - Mrs Manika Kaur - Dubai
- Sikhs in Media - Akaal Television - United Kingdom
- Sikhs in Profession - Jaspal Singh Bindra - India
- Sikhs in Seva - Gurmeet Singh - India
- Sikhs in Sports - Ram Singh Nayyar - Canada
- Sikh Lifetime Achievement Award - Sant Baba Iqbal Singh Ji - India
- Sikh People's Choice Award - Natasha Mudhar - United Kingdom
- Special Recognition Award - Mohammed bin Rashid Al Maktoum - Dubai

=== 8th Award Winners - 2017 ===
- Sikhs in Business - Harmeek Singh - Dubai
- Sikhs in Business - Balvinder Kaur Takhar - Canada
- Sikhs in Business - Balbir Singh Kakar - Canada
- Sikhs in Charity - Pakistan Sikh Council - Pakistan
- Sikhs in Education - Panth Rattan Bhai Sahiba Bibi ji Inderjit Kaur - United States
- Sikhs in Entertainment - Gurinder Kaur Chadha - United Kingdom
- Sikhs in Profession - Jagmeet Singh Dhaliwal - Canada
- Sikhs in Seva - Navdeep Singh Bhatia - Canada
- Sikhs in Sports - Yuvraj Singh Dhesi - Canada
- Sikh Lifetime Achievement Award - Sardarni Mann Kaur Ji - India
- Sikh People's Choice Award - Jaspreet Singh Nyotta - United Kingdom
- Special Recognition Award - Justin Trudeau - Canada

=== 9th Award Winners - 2018 ===
- Sikhs in Business - Charanjit Singh Hayer - Kenya
- Sikhs in Business - Harjinder Kaur Talwar - India
- Sikhs in Business - Harcharan Singh Ranauta - India
- Sikhs in Charity - Sikh Women's Society - Kenya
- Sikhs in Education - Harpreet Singh Sareen - United States
- Sikhs in Entertainment - Satpal Prakash Sabherwal - India
- Sikhs in Media - Amardeep Singh Gill - United Kingdom
- Sikhs in Profession - Arvinder Singh Reel - Kenya
- Sikhs in Seva - Jasdip Singh Jassi - United States
- Sikhs in Sports - Jaspreet Singh Chatthe - Kenya
- Sikh Lifetime Achievement Award - Hindpal Singh Jabbal - Kenya
- Sikh People's Choice Award - Aman Singh Gulati - India
- Special Recognition Award - Uhuru Kenyatta - Kenya

=== 10th Award Winners - 2019 ===
- Sikhs in Business - Balwinder Singh Sahni - United Arab Emirates
- Sikhs in Business - Joginder Singh Sunner - Canada
- Sikhs in Business - Varinder Kaur Virdy - Kenya
- Sikhs in Charity - Sikh Volunteers Australia - Australia
- Sikhs in Education - Gurinderpal Singh Josan - United States
- Sikhs in Entertainment - Rishi Rich - India
- Sikhs in Media - Chardikla Time TV - India
- Sikhs in Seva - Surinder Pal Singh Oberoi - United States
- Sikhs in Sports - Dal Singh Darroch - United Kingdom
- Sikh Lifetime Achievement Award - Manmohan Singh - India
- Sikh People's Choice Award - Sagarjeet Singh Ahuja Pakistan
- Special Appreication Award - Khalsa Aid India - India
- Special Faith Award - Harwant Singh Sahni - United Arab Emirates
