= Sind Sudhar =

First publication in the Sindhi language

Sindh Sudhar Sindhi: سنڌ سڌ ار, the first publication in Sindhi language was started in 1884. Initially published by Education Department of Sindh, it was taken out later by Sindh Saba. Sadhu Hiranand was its first editor from 1884-87.
