= Asian Vision =

Philippine telecommunications company

Asian Vision Cable Holdings, Inc. (Asian Vision)
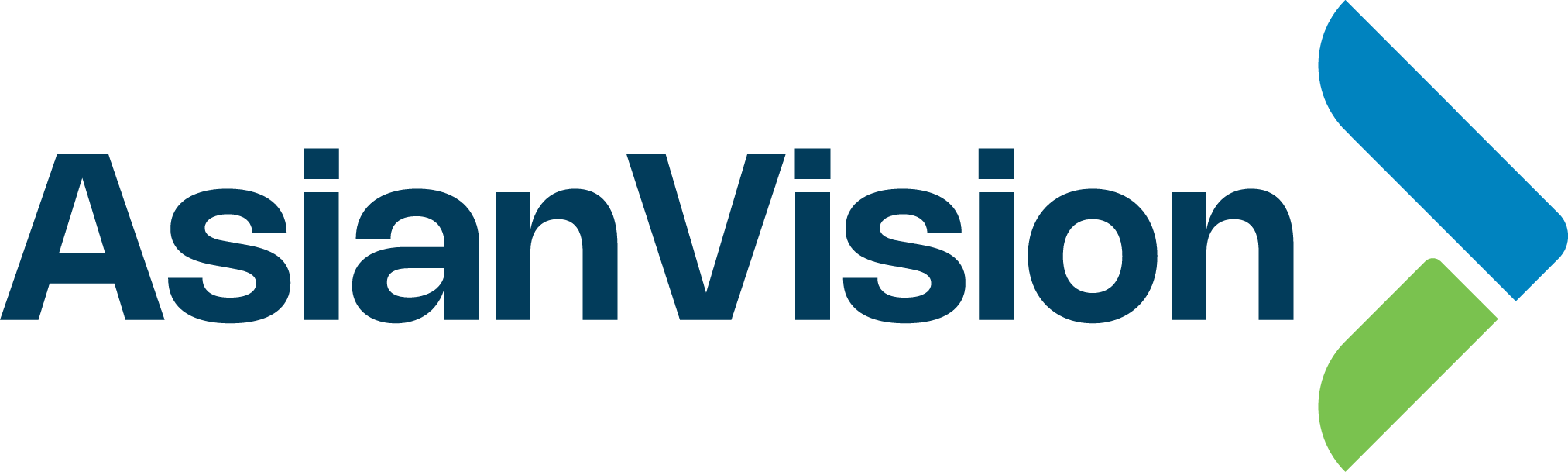
- Company type: Private
- Industry: Telecommunications
- Predecessor: myCATV (2011–2019)
- Founded: 1973; 53 years ago
- Founder: Ramon Magsaysay Jr.
- Headquarters: Lot 11 Block 1 Westside Villagefront Brentville, Brgy. Mamplasan, Biñan, Laguna, Philippines
- Area served: Zambales; Batangas; Quezon
- Key people: Francisco Magsaysay (President and CEO)
- Services: Digital Cable, Fiber Internet, Value-Added Service
- Website: asianvision.com.ph asianvisionenterprise.ph

Asian Vision Cable Holdings, Inc. (Asian Vision) is a telecommunications company in the Philippines. Founded in 1972 by Ramon "Jun" Magsaysay Jr., it was the second commercial cable television service in the country as Colorview CATV in Zambales.

Asian Vision has a number of subscribers covering areas in Zambales, Batangas and Quezon, offering cable television and broadband internet services.

== History ==
After the cable television industry in the Philippines began in 1969 with the founding of Nuvue Cablevision (founded by American expatriate Russel Swartley) in Baguio, businessman Ramon "Jun" Magsaysay Jr. (son of the late President Ramon Magsaysay) followed the footsteps of Swartley's legacy. After spending his 4-year tenure as Congressman representing the lone district of Zambales and returning to work in the private sector, he founded Colorview CATV in Olongapo, Zambales.

In 1977, Magsaysay expanded his cable business into the Southern Tagalog region by establishing Quezon CATV in Lucena.

In 1986, after the historic EDSA People Power Revolution where Corazon Aquino was elected president and toppled the regime of Ferdinand Marcos, Magsaysay established Batangas CATV in Batangas City. At the same time, he led a group of other cable television owners to form the Philippine Cable and Telecommunications Association (PCTA). Aquino later signed Executive No. 205 in 1987, which paved the way for the liberalization of the cable TV industry.

In 1995, Magsaysay stepped down as the company president to run for the Senatorial race. His son, Francisco "Paco" Magsaysay, took over his position.

In 2005, it began venturing into broadband internet services with the launch of Click Internet.

In 2011, all the companies under the Asian Vision group were reformed under a unified brand called myCATV.

In 2019, myCATV was renamed Asian Vision.

== List of service areas ==
Province	Area	Subsidiary
Zambales	Olongapo, Iba, Masinloc, Cabangan, Candelaria, Santa Cruz, San Narciso	Colorview CATV
Zambales	Subic, San Marcelino	Subic CATV
Zambales	Castillejos, San Felipe, San Antonio	Wesky Cable
Batangas	Batangas City, Bauan, San Pascual, Padre Garcia, Mabini	Batangas CATV
Batangas	Taal, Ibaan, Santa Teresita, Laurel, Rosario, San Juan, Lipa, Talisay, San Luis, San Jose, Malvar, San Pablo	Excelite CATV
Batangas	Lemery	Aclan Cable
Quezon	Lucena City, Pagbilao, Catanauan	Quezon CATV
Quezon	Tayabas	Tayabas Resources Ventures Corp
Quezon	Mauban	Southeast Cable
Quezon	Sariaya	Sariaya Cable
