= Akaal Channel =

UK based, free-to-air satellite Television channel

- Broadcast area: International
- Headquarters: Birmingham, UK

Programming
- Languages: Punjabi, English

Ownership
- Owner: Amrik Singh Kooner

History
- Launched: 2 September 2013

Links
- Website: www.akaalchannel.tv

Availability

Streaming media
- akaalchannel.tv: Watch live

Akaal Channel is a UK based, free-to-air satellite television channel which is dedicatedly focused on Sikhism and the Sikh community. Founded by Amrik Singh Kooner, the channel also broadcasts across 44 countries, including Europe, on satellite television. Formerly known as Sikh TV, the channel has a center in Amritsar as well.

== Awards and recognition ==
- Sikhs in Media at 7th Annual Sikhs Award, London
- The channel was reported to rank at number 21 in the category of UK Asian Entertainment TV channels at the end of April 2019.
- Best World Sikh Media, Annual Sikh Awards 2017

== Programming ==
The channel features a one-hour current affairs program weekly called 'Big Question.

== Humanitarian aid ==
The channel also has an 'Akaal Channel Aid' which is a humanitarian agency.

== See also ==
- Sikhism in England
- Sikhism in the United Kingdom
