= Sadhu Singh Hamdard =

Indian freedom fighter, journalist, poet

- Born: 1918 Paddi Math Wali, Banga, India
- Died: 27 July 1984 (aged 66) Jalandhar, India
- Occupation: Poet

Sadhu Singh Hamdard (1918–1984) was an Indian freedom fighter and journalist, excelling in both Urdu and Punjabi and an innovative poet, who carried in his name the pseudonym 'Hamdard', "sharing with all the pangs of their hearts," "friendly towards all."

== Early life as freedom fighter ==
As a high school student, he was active in Chaudhri Sher Jang's group of the radicals in the Yug Paltai Dal, party to impart a radical turn to the age. The Dal was formed in 1939-40 by Giani Harbans Singh of Sarhala Khurd in Hoshiarpur district. The Dal ceased to exist after the arrest and execution of its founder Harbans Singh, Sadhu Singh then joined the Shiromani Gurdwara Parbandhak Committee taking over its publicity wing.

== As a journalist and Chief Editor of Ajit ==
In 1944, Sadhu Singh entered the field of journalism. He took up editorship of the up to Daily Ajit (Urdu) and retained this position till 1957. In 1955, he also became chief editor of the Punjabi Ajit. The birth of the Ajit was an entirely new phenomenon in Punjabi journalism. It marked a new era of change and experimentation. In Sadhu Singh's hands, Punjabi journalism matured and reached new heights. The Ajit and Sadhu Singh Hamdard became synonymous names, he had so lovingly nursed the paper. Sadhu Singh set its permanent seal on Punjabi journalism. He created a new taste in Punjabi writing and introduced several new techniques. His services to Punjabi journalism, to what he did to give it a new face and format, were widely acknowledged.

== Awards ==
In 1963, the Punjab Government honoured him with the title of Shiromani Pattarkar (the journalist of the year). He was chairman of the reception committee of All India Newspapers Editors Conference held at Jalandhar in 1973. He also edited two monthly magazines Tasvir and Drishtl.

Within his lifetime, Sadhu Singh converted all his property and assets into a public trust for the advancement of Punjabi culture and letters.

Dr Sadhu Singh Hamdard was also awarded the title of Padma Shri by the Central Government in January 1984, but he surrendered the honour in protest against the army action in the precincts of the Golden Temple, Amritsar, in June 1984. Sadhu Singh Hamdard died a month later at Jalandhar on 29 July 1984.

== Poet ==
As a poet, Sadhu Hamdard is especially remembered for popularising the Ghazal form in Punjabi. His collection of Punjabi poems in the genre, entitled Ghazal won him a first prize from the Punjab Government in 1963. An anthology of his prose writings assembled under the title Akkhin Ditha Rus, a travelogue on his visits to Soviet Russia in 1967, also won the Punjab Government's award in 1972–73. He also wrote some novels built around heroic episodes from Sikh history as well as some short stories.

== Conferring of Ph.D ==
Guru Nanak Dev University, Amritsar, awarded him the Ph.D. degree for his thesis on "Origin and Development of the Punjabi Ghazal." He was a fellow of that University and member of its Syndicate. He was also a member of the Advisory Committee of the Languages Department and Press Advisory Committee of the Punjab Government, and of the Indian Academy of Letters (1973–1978). He was also president of the Kendri Punjabi Lekhak Sabha during 1972-79 and founder-president of Bazm-I-Adab (Urdu).
