= Sajni (album) =

Sajni (سجنی)

Studio album by Shaban Yusuf, Joans Foster
- Released: September 6, 2015
- Genre: Club music Sufi music Pop Music
- Length: 22:47
- Label: Venus
- Producer: Hot Ice Films

Singles from Sajni
- 1. "Sajni" Released: September 6, 2015

Sajni (سجنی) is an album by Shaban Yusuf (شعبان یوسف), a national stage artist. The album comprises five audio tracks with different genres written and composed by Shaban Yusuf. Joans Foster is the music director of the album.

== Track listing ==
The full track list was announced at Saavn.com on July 28, 2015.

No.	Title	Writer(s)	Singer(s)	Length
1.	"Chillum Trance"	Shaban Yusuf	Shaban Yusuf, Addy Ak	4:10
2.	"Desi Kudi"	Shaban Yusuf	Shaban Yusuf, Addy Ak	3:21
3.	"Lillah"	Shaban Yusuf	Shaban Yusuf, Baig Saya	4:48
4.	"Maula"	Shaban Yusuf	Shaban Yusuf	5:50
5.	"Sajni"	Shaban Yusuf	Shaban Yusuf, Baig Saya	4:38
Total length:				22:47
