= Khyber Mail (newspaper) =

English language newspaper in Peshawar, Pakistan

- Type: Daily newspaper
- Founder: Sheikh Sanaullah
- Founded: 1932; 94 years ago
- Ceased publication: 1989
- Language: English
- City: Peshawar
- Country: Pakistan

Khyber Mail was a daily newspaper published from Peshawar, Khyber-Pakhtunkhwa, Pakistan. The news service was discontinued in 2004.

Sheikh Sanaullah was the founder editor of Khyber Mail, the first English newspaper of the then NWFP that he started from Peshawar in 1932. He was an eminent journalist who began his career as a sub-editor in daily 'Muslim Outlook", Lahore. He worked as a special correspondent of several Indian and foreign newspapers. He was an experienced newsman and was acknowledged far and wide when he successfully reported for the daily "Pioneer" Lucknow, the proceedings of the Court Martial of the Indian officers and jawans who had refused to fire on the unarmed people at the Qissa Khwani Bazar of Peshawar in 1930.

The newspaper survived till 2004, edited, published and managed by his sons Shiekh Zakaullah, Sheikh Inayat Ullah and Shiekh Saleemullah, mainly by the oldest, Shiekh Zakaullah, who himself was a distinguished journalist, a sportsman, a parliamentarian and a philanthropist. The news service died with the death of Shiekh Zakaullah in 1990.

Prominent among the editors of this news service were (now all deceased except Sabir Hussain) Shiekh Zakaullah, Qalandar Momand, Askar Ali Shah, Mr Mashwani, Ziauddin Ahmad and Sabir Hussain.

== See also ==
- List of newspapers in Pakistan
