= Sandesh (Pakistani newspaper) =

Pakistani Newspaper

Sandesh (Sindhi: سنديش, Urdu: سندیش) is the name of a Sindhi language newspaper in Pakistan, notable for being the only newspaper catering to Pakistan's Hindu community. The paper was founded by Harji Lal, and Mukesh Meghwar and is sold at a price that is affordable to the impoverished rural Hindu community in Sindh, which has however caused financial strain to its founder. The newspaper is based in the town of Kotri, Sindh and an Urdu version of the paper is planned.
