= Balle Balle =

Phrase used in Bhangra Punjabi songs

Balle Balle (Gurmukhi: ਬੱਲੇ ਬੱਲੇ, Shahmukhi: بلّے بلّے) is a phrase used in many Punjabi songs to depict a feeling of happiness. It is used in the same way as the English expressions, "Hooray!" or "Hurrah!". It derives from the Sanskrit word भल्ल (bhalla), which means "auspicious, favourable". An equivalent to this is "Shava Shava" (Gurmukhi: ਸ਼ਾਵਾ ਸ਼ਾਵਾ, Shahmukhi: شاوا شاوا). It is used in Bhangra songs and dances generally set in the Punjab. It has become a symbol to refer to Punjabis and Sikhs in general.
