= Ajit (newspaper) =

Punjabi language newspaper

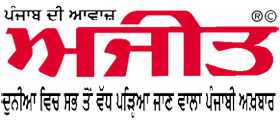

- Front page of 12 February 2020
- Type: Daily newspaper
- Format: Broadsheet
- Owner: Pudhari Group
- Editor-in-chief: Barjinder Singh Hamdard
- Founded: 1941; 85 years ago
- Political alignment: Conservative, Punjabism, Sikhism
- Language: Punjabi
- Headquarters: Jalandhar, India
- Sister newspapers: Ajit Samachar (Hindi daily); Daily Ajit (Urdu daily); Pudhari
- Website: ajitjalandhar.com

Ajit (Daily Ajit) is a Punjabi language daily newspaper published in Jalandhar, India. The newspaper is run by Sadhu Singh Hamdard Trust and has been publishing since 1941. Veteran journalist and ex-Rajya Sabha member, Barjinder Singh Hamdard, is the current editor-in-chief. In 2007–08, it claimed a circulation of more than 333,000.

== History ==
Ajit started its circulation with an Urdu language weekly edition in 1941 from Shaheed Sikh Missionary College Amritsar. Ajit Singh Ambalvi was its first editor. In November 1942, it became a daily newspaper and began printing from Lahore. After independence it moved its base to Jalandhar and Sadhu Singh Hamdard became its editor. In 1955, its name was changed to Ajit Patrika and the language was changed from Urdu to Punjabi. Later in 1957, its name was changed back to Ajit. After Hamdard's death in 1984, its present editor Barjinder Singh Hamdard took charge. In 1996, a Hindi edition titled "Ajit Samachar" was commenced and in 2002 its website was launched. Ajit established a new milestone in its historic journey by starting Hindi daily Ajit named "Ajit Samachar" to further widen the circle of its readership. It was a new and fresh message in the field of journalism. It is gratifying indeed, that Ajit Samachar, keeping its traditions alive has not only made big strides on the chosen path but has also been discharging its responsibilities in a very effective manner. This newspaper has widened the horizons of the group. Today it is successfully hosting its flag in Haryana Himachal and Jammu Kashmir.

== Editors ==
- Ajit Singh Ambalvi (1941–1947)
- Sadhu Singh Hamdard (1947–1984)
- Barjinder Singh Hamdard (1984–Present)

== See also ==
- Khalsa Akhbar Lahore
- Punjabi Tribune
- List of newspapers
- List of newspapers in India by circulation
- List of newspapers in the world by circulation
