= Quami Ekta =

- Frontpage of Quami Ekta Weekly Punjabi Newspaper (Volume 7, Issue 1) 2010
- Type: Daily Online newspaper and Weekly Print newspaper
- Format: Broadsheet
- Editor: Harjeet Singh Sandhu
- Founded: June 14, 2002
- Headquarters: California, United States
- Price: Free
- Website: quamiekta.com

Quami Ekta (Punjabi: ਕੌਮੀ ਏਕਤਾ; transl. National Unity) is a California-based online newspaper and a Punjabi weekly print newspaper targeting Punjabis throughout the world. The online edition is in both Punjabi and English. The newspaper was launched in 2002 as an online newspaper and in 2004 as a weekly broadsheet print newspaper. Both the online and print edition are available free of cost.

In July 2007 Quami Ekta honored Dharmendra for his contributions to the Indian cinema.
