= Daily Lokaai =

Pakistani newspaper

- Type: Daily newspaper
- Format: Print, online
- Owner(s): Jameel Ahmad Paul
- Founded: 2006
- Language: Punjabi

The Daily Lokaai (Punjabi:روزوار لوکائی) is a daily newspaper of Punjab, Pakistan. Lokaai means people or masses in Punjabi. Lokaai was first published in 2006, to fill the gap after the closure of the daily Khabran, a Punjabi version of Khabrain. Lokaai currently publishes from Lahore, Pakistan. Jameel Ahmad Paul is current editor of the newspaper. Daily Lokaai covers national, international and regional news. Provincial newspapers and publications face hardship, but despite these obstacles, Lokaai provides media service to a Punjabi audience.
