= Rozana Spokesman =

Indian newspaper

Rozana Spokesman is a Punjabi-language daily newspaper in India, mainly circulated in the Punjab region. During its earlier years it was a weekly newspaper. Joginder Singh is the editor. Currently it has the fourth-largest circulation of all Punjabi-language newspapers.
