= The Sikh Times =

The Sikh Times is a Handsworth-based dual-language weekly newspaper primarily targeting Sikhs in the Birmingham area in England.

It is written in both Punjabi and English, with English covering most of the paper's content.

The newspaper was launched on the Soho Road in the Handsworth area of Birmingham in 2001 by Gurjeet Bains, who is the editor, and Jaspal Singh, who is the publisher. The newspaper firm has now grown to a size that it relocated to Alexandra Road in the Business Village.

Gurjeet, as editor of The Sikh Times, received the Media, Sports & Arts Award at the Lloyds TSB Asian Jewel Central Awards in 2006.

In July 2006, the newspaper announced they were to launch an online subscription service. The Sikh Times had Sikh historian Dr Harjinder Singh Dilgeer as Editor of the Punjabi section for one year, December 2001 to December 2002.
