= Sajjan (newspaper) =

Pakistani Newspaper

Sajjan Lahore (Punjabi: روزنامہ سجن / ਰੁਜ਼ਾਨਾ ਸਜਣ) was a Punjabi newspaper published from Lahore, Punjab, Pakistan. It was the first Punjabi daily newspaper to be published in Pakistan.

Its first issue appeared on 3 February 1989. Is still continued today now in the form of E-Newspaper with the name of SajjanLahore.com, but it was discontinued after that because of financial constraints caused by a lack of advertising revenue from the government and the private sector. It was a venture of Punjabi Promotion Trust. Hussain Naqi was its managing editor, Qaisar Nazir Khawar was its deputy managing editor, whereas Zafrayab Ahmed was its editor. Zafaryab Ahmed died on 25 February 2006.

A number of Punjabi lovers worked in it voluntarily not only in editorial team but also in administrative setup.

== See also ==
- List of newspapers in Pakistan
