= Daily Awami Awaz =

Pakistani Newspaper

- Type: Daily newspaper
- Format: Broadsheet
- Owner(s): Abdul Jabbar Khattak
- Publisher: Marvi Publication
- Editor: Abdul Jabbar Khattak
- Headquarters: Karachi, Pakistan
- Website: www.awamiawaz.pk

Awami Awaz (Sindhi: روزاني عوامي آواز) is a Sindhi-language daily newspaper and news TV channel in Pakistan. The newspaper is published from Karachi. The current chief editor of the newspaper is Jabbar Khattak.
