= Sangat TV =

- Sangat Television

Ownership
- Owner: Sangat Trust

History
- Launched: 1 September 2010

Links
- Website: sangattelevision.org

Availability

Streaming media
- Livestream: Watch live

Sangat Television is a SKY TV channel, and is a Project of, and wholly owned by Sangat Trust, a Registered UK charity. The station commenced broadcasting on 1 September 2010, as part of a two-week test phase.

== Description ==
Sangat TV is owned by Sangat Trust, a UK Registered Charity backed by gurdwaras from the UK and from other individuals. The channel is an open platform for the Sikhs sangat to express their views independently. Programming includes educational material on the Sikh gurus and Guru Granth Sahib. The channel is now broadcast on Sky channel 763, and online 24/7 from the sangattelevision.org website.

== West Midlands riots ==
Sangat TV came into prominence during the West Midlands riots of August 2011. The presenter Upinder Randhawa notably broadcast live from the streets of Birmingham from the first day of rioting in the area, Monday 8 August 2011, to provide accurate, live information and broadcasts. Coverage was extended to the surrounding areas such as West Bromwich and Wolverhampton the following night. The channel's coverage was used by BBC News, ITN and Sky News as well as international stations such as CNN, Fox News and NDTV 24x7 to show what was happening in the area.

This coverage included sequences of guerrilla journalism, most notably footage of the reporting team transporting a police officer in their vehicle in pursuit of looters while live on air. The popularity of the coverage led to Sangat TV presenter Upinder Randhawa's Twitter following jumping from 600 users to about 4,000 users in one night, as well as having over 4,000 followers to a fan page on Facebook called "Upinder Randhawa from Sangat TV is a Legend". Prime Minister David Cameron hailed Sangat TV's contribution as "an example of a media company's commitment to social responsibility".
