= Khabrain =

Pakistani Newspaper

Daily Khabrain
- Type: Daily newspaper
- Format: Tabloid
- Owner(s): Khabrain Group of Newspapers
- Founder(s): Zia Shahid
- Founded: 26 September 1992
- Language: Urdu
- Website: dailykhabrain.com.pk

Daily Khabrain (Urdu: روزنامہ خبریں) is a Pakistani daily newspaper based in Lahore. The Daily Khabrain is published by the Khabrain Group of Newspapers. It is published simultaneously from Islamabad, Karachi, Lahore, Peshawar, Multan, Hyderabad, Muzaffarabad South Punjab Bahawalpur and Sukkur.

It is a member publication of All Pakistan Newspapers Society organization.

== History ==
Daily Khabrain was established following a split in the editorial staff of Daily Jang's Lahore office during the late 1980s. Zia Shahid, among others, left to create Daily Pakistan, a publication funded by a group of investors known as members.

Within a year, differences arose between Shahid and the senior editorial staff, prompting him to initiate Daily Khabrain in 1992. In this new venture, he transformed the business model, requiring potential reporters and distributors to purchase an upfront membership.

== Editorial stance ==
The newspaper has displayed a proactive editorial stance. It created teams to inspect various businesses for potential illegalities, which were then publicized. In addition, it took on a role in moral policing, particularly for women and youth in educational institutions and marketplaces.

In 1997, Daily Khabrain focused its efforts against Mohammed Yusuf Ali from Lahore, alleging that he proclaimed himself a prophet. The term "kazzab", or liar, was used to label him. In 2000, he was convicted on blasphemy charges and sentenced to death but was murdered in prison before the sentence could be carried out. Purportedly, a reporter from Daily Khabrain was involved in smuggling a weapon into the prison for the murder.

By the mid-1990s, the newspaper's sensationalist and nationalistic reporting style had propelled it to become the third largest daily in Punjab, following Daily Jang and Nawa-i-Waqt.

== Khabrain Group ==
Khabrain Group owns the following publications and television station:

- Daily Khabraan, a Punjabi language newspaper
- Daily Khabroon, a Sindhi language newspaper
- Daily The Post
- Sahafat, defunct newspaper
- Channel 5, founded in 2012

== Ownership ==
- Zia Shahid family (63.9 percent)
- Aleem Chaudhry (8.2 percent)
- Muzzafar Un Nisa (2.7 percent)

== Notable columnist ==
- Humayon Dar - a specialist in Islamic banking and finance
