= India–Italy relations =

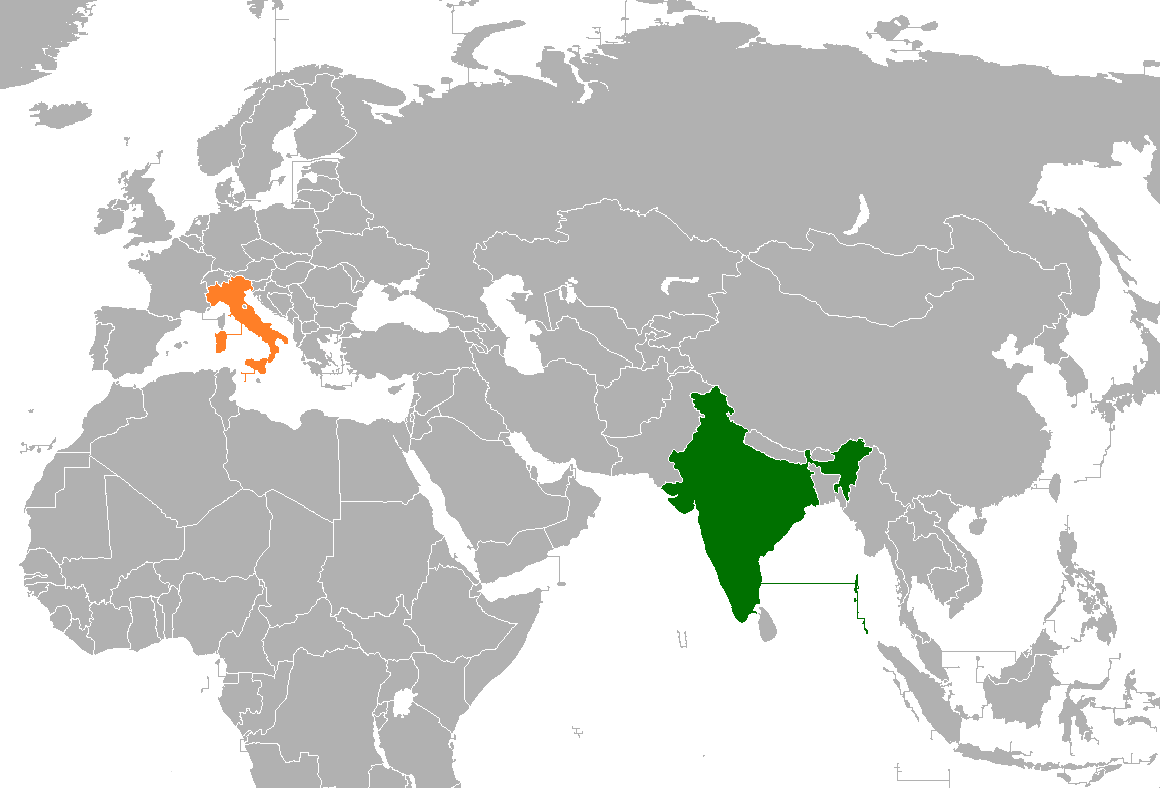
- India: Italy

Diplomatic mission
- Embassy of India, Rome: Embassy of Italy, New Delhi

Envoy
- Indian Ambassador to Italy Vani Rao: Italian Ambassador to India Vincenzo de Luca

India–Italy relations are the international relations that exist between the republics of India and Italy. Historically, trade and cultural ties date back to the era of the Roman Empire and ancient India. Italy contains one of the largest Indian populations in continental Europe after Germany. India maintains an Embassy in Rome, a Consulate-General in Milan and an honorary consul in Caserta. Italy has an embassy in New Delhi, and Consulate-Generals in Mumbai, Kolkata and Bengaluru.

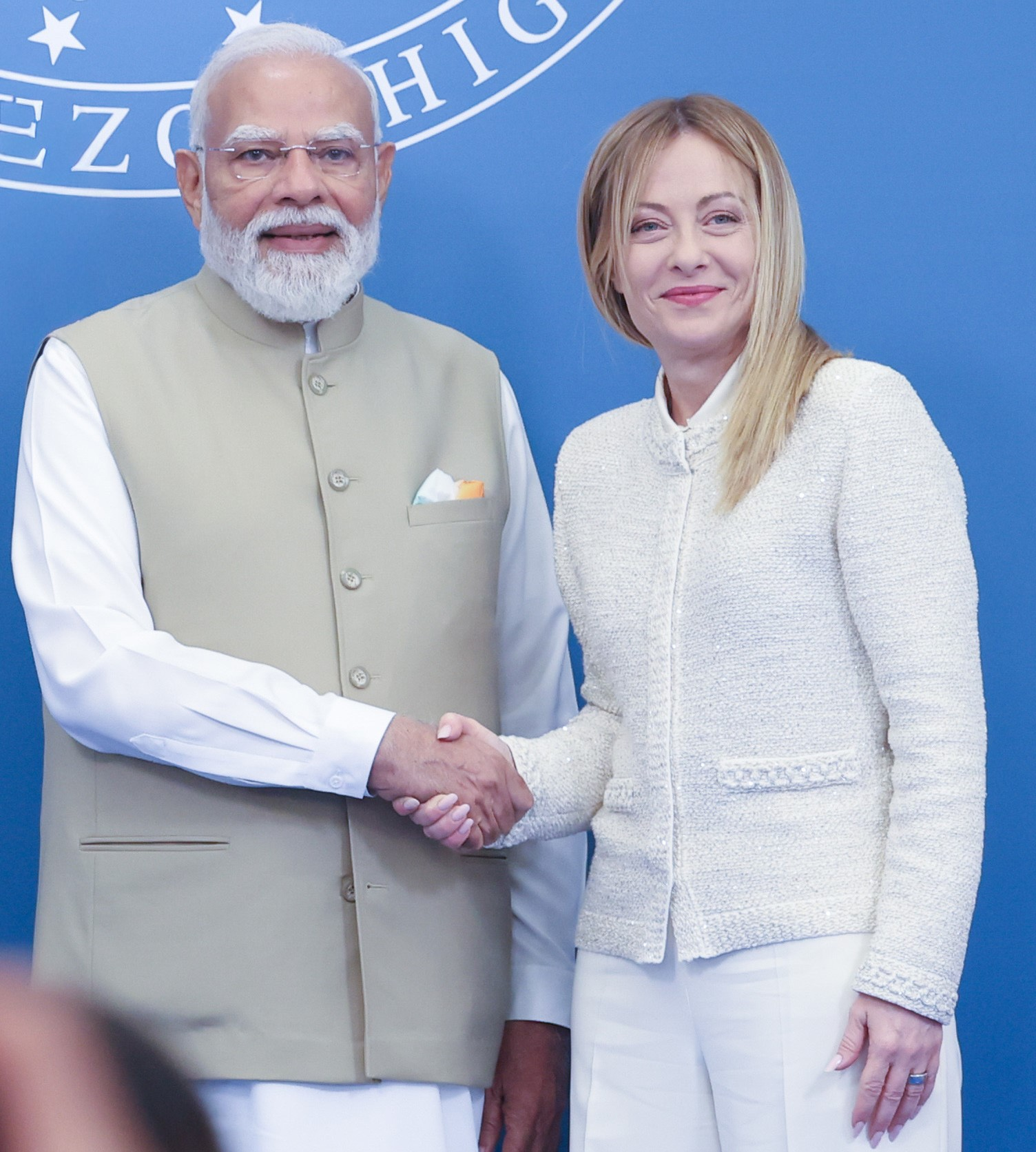
Prime Minister of India, Shri Narendra Modi in a bilateral meeting with the Prime Minister of the ltalian Republic, Giorgia Meloni, in Rome, Italy in 2026.

== Early history ==
=== Indo-Roman relations ===
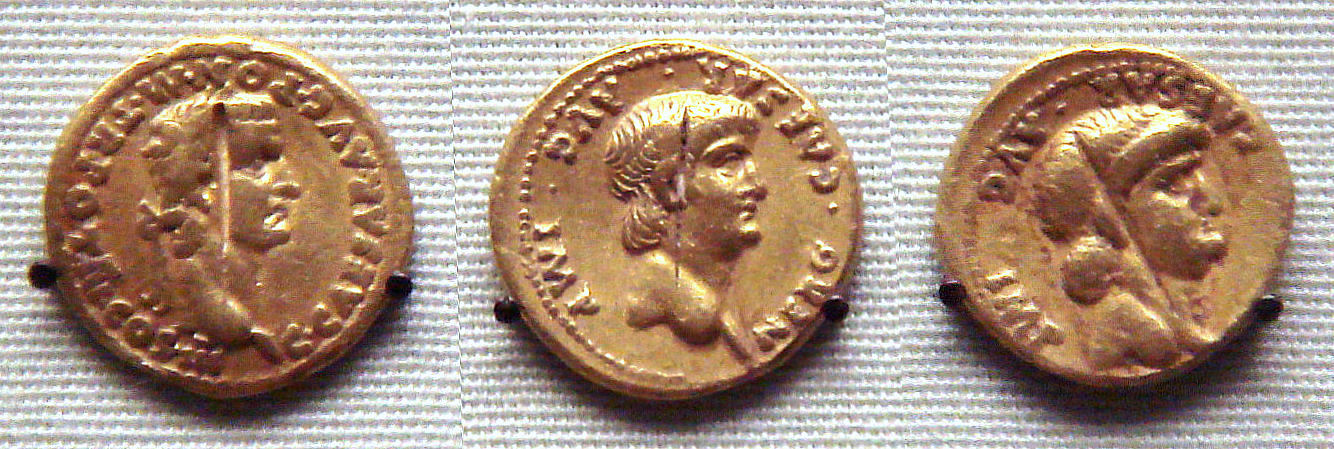
Roman coins depicting Caligula and Nero found in Pudukkottai, Tamil Nadu.

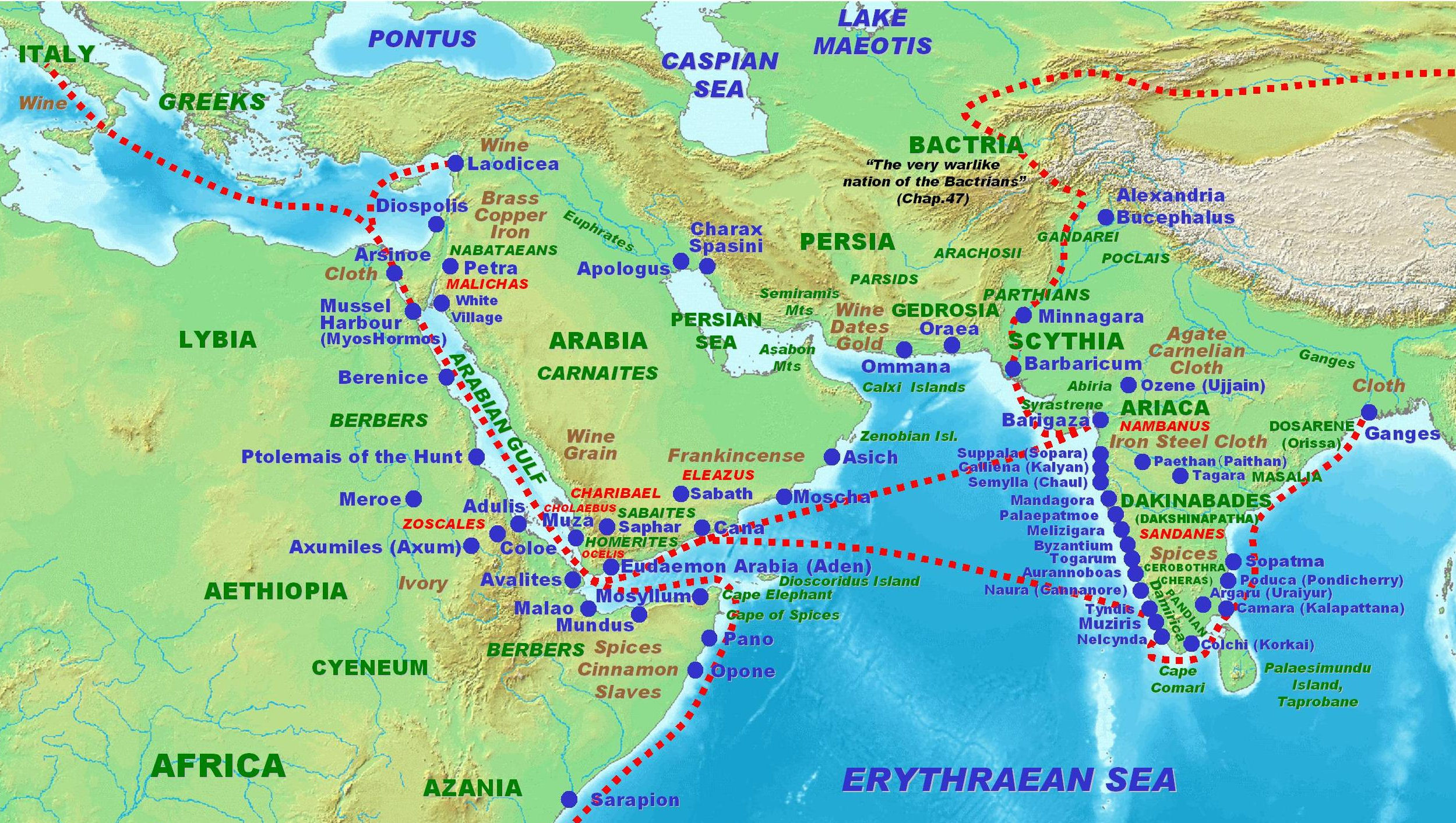
Roman maritime trade in India and Scythia according to the Periplus Maris Erythraei, 1st century AD

Relations between India and Italy date back to ancient times. Works from authors such as Diodorus Siculus' Library of History, Arrian's Indika, and Pliny the Elder's Natural History make references to India. Piper (Modern Italian: pepe), or pepper (both longum and nigrium), increased in popularity in Rome around 30 BC, and eventually over 70 per cent of Roman recipes required the use of Indian pepper.

The first documented relations between ancient India and ancient Rome occurred during the reign of Augustus (27 BC – AD 14), the first Roman Emperor. The Romans were referred as रोमक Romaka in Sanskrit, while the Romans called the Indians in Latin Indī.

According to Strabo (II.5.12), not long after Augustus took control of Egypt, while Gallus was Prefect of Egypt (26–24 BC), up to 120 ships were setting sail every year from Myos Hormos to modern-day India:

"At any rate, when Gallus was prefect of Egypt, I accompanied him and ascended the Nile as far as Syene and the frontiers of Ethiopia, and I learned that as many as one hundred and twenty vessels were sailing from Myos Hormos to India, whereas formerly, under the Ptolemies, only a very few ventured to undertake the voyage and to carry on traffic in Indian merchandise."

— Strabo II.5.12.

Gaius Plinius Secundus (AD 23–79), generally known as Pliny the Elder, writing c. AD 77, left probably the most important account of India and its trade with Rome that has survived in Classical literature. He gives quite a lot of detail about India, albeit not all accurate, but his observations do more than just outline the bare bones of history, and help give us some picture of how intimately Indian culture and trade was becoming known:

"Coral is as highly valued among the Indians as Indian pearls. It is also found in the Red Sea, but there it is darker in colour. The most prized is found in the Gallic Gulf around the Stoechades Islands, in the Sicilian Gulf around the Aeolian Islands, and around Drepanum. . . . Coral-berries are no less valued by Indian men than specimen Indian pearls by Roman ladies. Indian soothsayers and seers believe that coral is potent as a charm for warding off dangers. Accordingly they delight in its beauty and religious power. Before this became known, the Gauls used to decorate their swords, shields and helmets with coral. Now it is very scarce because of the price it commands, and is rarely seen in its natural habitat." Pliny. Natural History (AD 77) (XXXII, chaps. 21, 23).

The Peutinger Table, a medieval copy of a 4th or early 5th century map of the world, shows a "Temple to Augustus" at Muziris, one of the main ports for trade to the Roman Empire on the southwest coast of India. This and evidence of agreements for loans between agents, one of whom most likely lived in Muziris, and a rather oblique reference in the Periplus, all seem to point to a settlement of Roman subjects living in the region. Embassies are recorded as arriving from the "Indians of the East" at the court of Constantine the Great (r. 306–337):

"Ambassadors from the Indians of the East brought presents . . . . which they presented to the king (Constantine the Great) as an acknowledgment that his sovereignty extended to their ocean. They told him, too, how Princes of India had dedicated pictures and statues in his honour in token that they had recognised him as their autocrat and king." Eusebius of Caesarea (fl. early 4th century) Vita Constantini IV. 50.

=== Middle Ages ===
Relations and trade between the Mediterranean and India ended after the fall of the Roman Empire, but resumed after a few centuries. Marco Polo published his travelogue The Travels of Marco Polo in which he described the life and customs in India at the end of the 13th century.

Many other notable Venetians also visited India. Niccolò de' Conti left Venice in 1419 to visit the Middle East, Persia and then India.

=== British Raj ===
During the British Raj, trade and travel between India and Italy reduced significantly due to prevailing political conditions. Italian scholars participated in Sanskrit studies, and Gaspare Gorresio created the first Chair of Sanskrit in Italy at the University of Turin in 1852. Gorresio translated the Ramayana into Italian. It was published as Ramayana, poema indiano di Valmichi in ten volumes between 1843 and 1858. The Italian unification movement inspired some Indian freedom fighters, and the works of the Italian patriot Giuseppe Mazzini were translated and widely read by Indian intelligentsia.

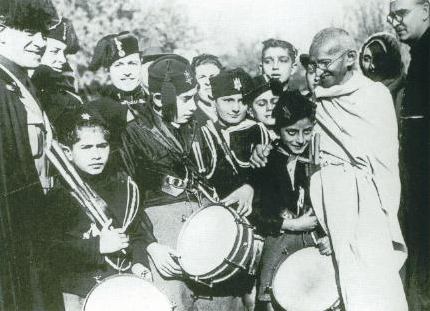
Mahatma Gandhi in Rome.

In the 1940s, during World War II, the British brought Italian prisoners of war, who were captured in either Europe or North Africa, to Bangalore and Madras. They were put up at the Garrison Grounds, today's Parade Grounds-Cubbon Road area.^{[4]} In February 1941, about 2,200 Italian prisoners of war arrived in Bangalore by a special train and were marched to internment camps at Byramangala, 20 miles from Bangalore.^{[5]}

Fascist Italy under Benito Mussolini maintained friendly ties with Indian nationalist leaders Mahatma Gandhi and Subhas Chandra Bose, and Mussolini expressed genuine support for Indian independence during the 1930s and 1940s, though it at first remained sceptical that Bose's efforts would receive significant support from its ally, Nazi Germany. In May 1942, Italy advocated for the Tripartite Pact to formally endorse Indian independence, though this was vetoed at the time by Germany. Nevertheless, as Bose grew closer to Germany in the 1940s, Italy grew closer to his rival, Indian Muslim leader Mohammad Iqbal Shedai, bringing Italy's India policy in line with its policy of seeking Muslim support in the Middle East. Eventually, the Battaglione Azad Hindoustan unit of British Indian prisoners of war was formed under Shedai's leadership, though the soldiers involved were viewed as disloyal by Italian authorities and the unit ultimately mutinied in November 1942. In 1943, Italy, Germany and six other Axis states formally recognised the Bose-led Azad Hind as the government of India.

British Indian forces played a role in liberating Italy from Nazi control. India contributed the 3rd largest Allied contingent in the Italian campaign after US and British forces. The 4th, 8th and 10th Divisions and 43rd Gurkha Infantry Brigade led the advance, notably at the gruelling Battle of Monte Cassino.

== Modern history ==
Diplomatic relations between the Republic of India and the Italian Republic were established in 1947. Indian Prime Minister Jawaharlal Nehru visited Italy in 1953. President Oscar Luigi Scalfaro was the first Italian head of state to visit India in February 1995. President Carlo Azeglio Ciampi visited India in February 2005.

Romano Prodi became the first Italian Prime Minister to visit India in February 2007. Indian Prime Minister Manmohan Singh visited Italy to attend the 35th G8 summit at L'Aquila in July 2009. External Affairs Minister S.M. Krishna represented India at the 150th anniversary celebrations of the unification of Italy in Rome In June 2011.

After some years of tensions due to the 2012 case of the two Italian marines accused of killing two fishermen off the coast of Kerala, the two countries revived normal relations thanks to Prime Ministers Paolo Gentiloni and Narendra Modi. The two leaders described Gentiloni's visit in India in 2017 as a "new beginning" and a great opportunity for both countries.

At the 50th G7 Summit, which was held in Italy in 2024, Italian Prime Minister Giorgia Meloni shared a selfie video of her with Indian Prime Minister Narendra Modi on X and Instagram with the caption "Hi friends, from #Melodi". #Melodi being a portmanteau of both their surnames. On X, the video has been viewed over 40 million times.

== Economic relations ==
=== Bilateral trade ===
Bilateral trade between India and Italy grew by 12 times in the 2 decades between 1991 and 2011, from EUR 708 million to EUR 8.5 billion. Bilateral trade began experiencing a decline from 2012, decreasing to €7.1 billion in 2012 and €6.95 billion in 2013.

On November 29, 2017, India and Italy signed a memorandum of understanding (MoU) for enhancing bilateral cooperation in the health sector. This MoU was signed between Union Health Minister J P Nadda and the visiting Italian Health Minister Beatrice Lorenzin. The MoU envisages cooperation in health sector by pooling in technical, financial and human resources for accomplishing the ultimate objective to upgrade infrastructural resources, medical education and research in both countries. Activities to be carried out under the scope of this MoU include exchange and training of doctors, setting up of health care facilities and promotion of business development opportunities in pharmaceuticals.

As of 2025, the bilateral trade stood at 14.25 billion euros in 2025. India’s exports to Italy were at 8.55 billion euros, while India imported 5.70 billion euros worth of goods from Italy.

=== Foreign direct investment ===
Italian companies invested €694 million in India in 2011, and over €1 billion in 2012. As of December 2012, Italy had an accumulated investment of €3.75 billion in India, or 9% of the total European Union FDI in India.

Indian investment in Italy grew from €584 million in 2004 to €10 billion in 2011. Italy accounted for 2.3% of India's total investment in the European Union.

== Resident diplomatic missions ==
- India has an embassy in Rome and a consulate-general in Milan.
- Italy has an embassy in New Delhi and a consulates-general in Bengaluru, Kolkata and Mumbai.

== See also ==
- Foreign relations of Italy
- Foreign relations of India
- Italians in India
- Indians in Italy
- Tamils in Italy
- Hinduism in Italy
- Buddhism in Italy
- Hinduism in Italy
- Sikhism in Italy
