= List of Lebanese people in Italy =

This is a list of notable individuals born in Italy of Lebanese ancestry or people of Lebanese and Italian dual nationality who live or lived in Italy.

== Entertainment ==
- Bob Azzam, singer
- Antonella Lualdi, actress

== Sciences ==
- Luca Turin, biophysicist

== Sports ==
- Bruno Carmeni, judoka

== Writers ==
- Gad Lerner, journalist

== See also ==
- Italian Lebanese
- Italy–Lebanon relations
- List of Lebanese people
- List of Lebanese people (Diaspora)
