= Hinduism in Italy =

Italian Hindus
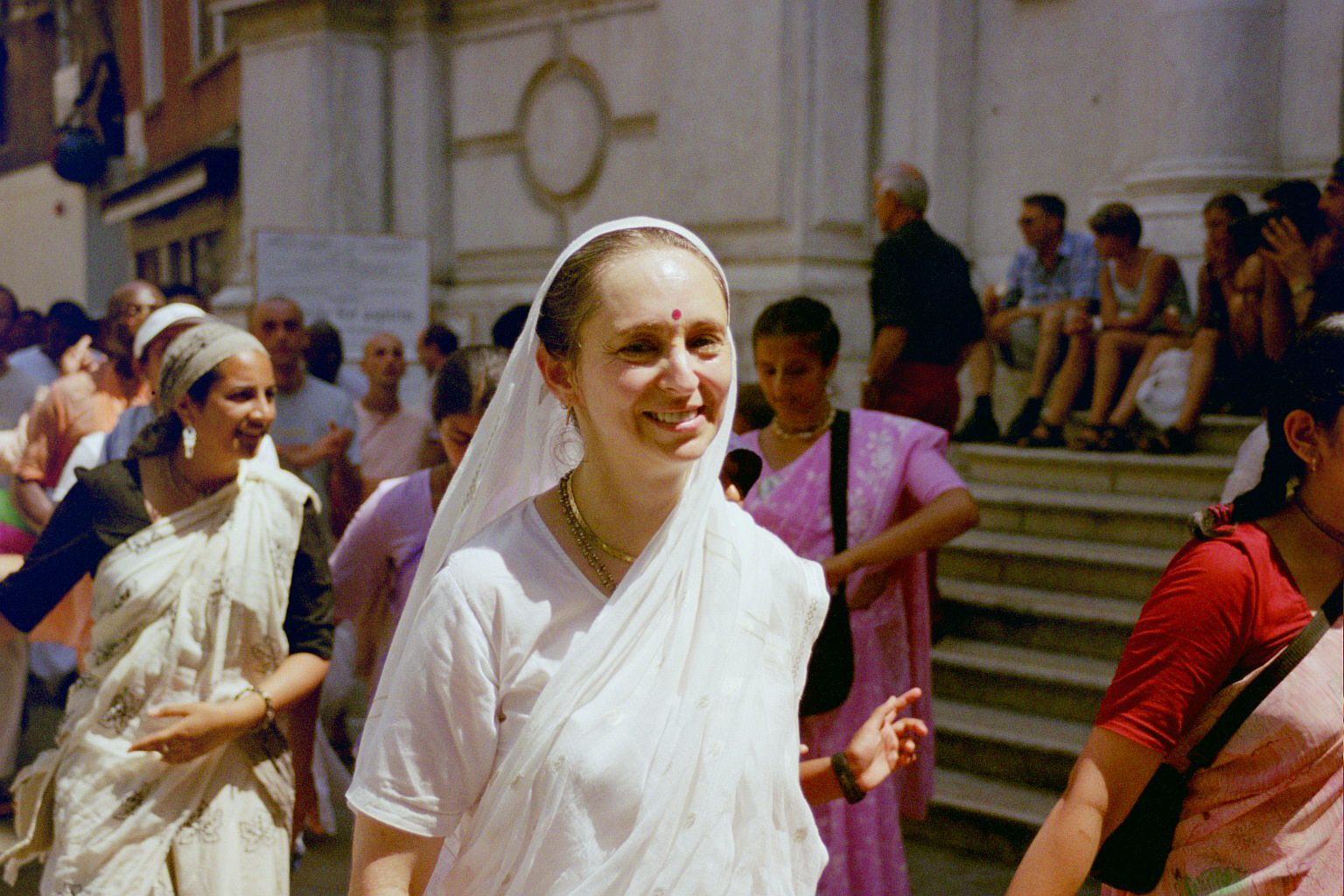
- ISKCON devotees in Venice, Italy

Total population
- 223,000 (2023) ▲ (0.4%) of total population

Regions with significant populations
- Rome, Milan, Venice

Religions
- Hinduism

Languages
- Sacred; Sanskrit; Majority; Hindi, English, Tamil and other Indian diaspora languages, some also speak Italian

Hinduism is practised by 0.4% of the people in Italy. It is practised by 0.1% of the Italian citizens and 2.9% of the immigrant population. In 2012, there were about 90,000 Hindus in Italy. In 2015, the population increased to 120,000. As of 2023, the population is around 223,000 - the second largest Hindu community in Europe after the United Kingdom, and the largest Hindu community in the European Union.The majority of Hindus in Italy are of Indian, Sri Lanka, and Bengali descent. Though, a small proportion of Hindus are ethnic Italian converts.

Organized international Hindu groups have established links to Italy since 1950s. In 1996 Italian Hindus established the Italian Hindu Union. In 2007 the union signed a formal agreement with the Italian state, in was passed in law in 2012 by parliament. It was passed under Article 8 of the Constitution, which sets the rules for the state's relations with religions other than Catholicism.

== History ==
Hindu spiritual leaders and teachers visited Italy in the early 20th century. Paramahansa Yogananda first visited Italy in 1935 before settling in the United States and establishing the Self-Realization Fellowship (SRF). After the Italian edition of the Autobiography of a Yogi was published in 1951, Italian members of the SRF held meditation groups and other public events. Yogananda's belief in how his teachings aligned with Christianity allowed the SRF to grow. In 1960, Maharishi Mahesh Yogi visited Italy and introduced Transcendental Meditation. Other groups established a presence in the following decades: Shri Ram Chandra Mission (1972), International Society for Krishna Consciousness (ISKCON) (1973), Sathya Sai Baba Organisation (1977), and Vishwa Nirmala Dharma Movement (1982). Beginning with the 1980s, academics began studying the Hindu diaspora and how Hindu beliefs and practices were received within Italy and Europe.

The Italian Hindu Union (Italian: Unione Induista Italiana, UII) was established in 1996 by Swami Yogananda Giri of the Gitananda Ashram along with the Indian Embassy and scholars to represent Hindus in Italy. In 2000, a presidential decree recognised the UII as a religious denomination, the first time in Italian history that a religion other than Judaism or Christianity had received official state designation. The UII signed an agreement with the Italian government in 2007, in accordance with Italian Constitution Article 8, which regulates the relations with religious minorities. In 2012, the Italian Parliament approved the agreement alongside the Italian Buddhist Union.

== Demographics ==
Although there are no exact figures for the number of Hindus in Italy, estimates rely on immigration from countries with large Hindu communities, like India, Bangladesh, and Sri Lanka. In 2017, India, Bangladesh, and Sri Lanka ranked sixth, eighth, and twelfth, respectively, in terms of citizens requesting visas. During the Sri Lankan civil war, migrants sought asylum in Italy. In a 2019 report, Eurispes (Institute of Political, Economic, and Social Studies) estimated 180,000 Hindus lived in Italy (150,000 of South Asian origin; 30,000 of Italian origin). In 2020, Jacobsen estimated 200,000 Hindus of South Asian origin lived in Italy, the second largest after the United Kingdom and tied with the Netherlands, and France.

| Year | Population | Percent of Total Population | Change |
|---|---|---|---|
| 2012 | 90,000 | 0.1% | N/A |
| 2015 | 120,000 | 0.2% | ▲30% |
| 2021 | 180,000 | 0.3% | ▲50% |
| 2023 | 223,000 | 0.4% | ▲24% |

== Hindu organisations ==
=== Italian Hindu Union (UII) ===
This designation allows the UII to receive funding like other federally recognized religious minorities, federal accreditation of Hindu training courses for teachers in public schools, and the presence of Hindu ministers in public hospitals.

The UII consists of 16 communities and four centres, including the Gitananda Ashram, which comprises approximately 5000 individuals (about half Italian) and 50,000 Hindus from Sri Lanka and Tamil Nadu. However, other groups which established themselves beginning in the 1950s had received legal recognition prior to the UII's conception, and the majority of Hindus living in Italy are unaffiliated with the UII.

=== Self-Realisation Fellowship (SRF) ===
Paramahansa Yogananda first visited Rome and Assisi in 1935. After the publication of Yogananda's Autobiography of a Yogi in 1951, the SRF began holding public gatherings, like meditation groups. Yogananda believed that his teachings overlapped with Christianity, which allowed his followers to engage in interfaith dialogue and for the SRF to grow in Italy. As of 2020, the SRF remains unaffiliated with the UII and includes 10,000 Italian members across three centres, twelve groups, and 53 meditation circles.

=== Transcendental Meditation (TM) ===
Maharishi Mahesh Yogi introduced TM to Italy in 1960. As of 2020, there are 54 TM centres in Italy. David Lynch promoted TM on Italian television. Lynch's foundation also expressed interest in creating TM training courses in schools.

=== Shri Ram Chandra Mission ===
Established in Italy in 1972 by followers of Ram Chandra of Shahjahanpur, the group teaches yogic principles that align with European lifestyle without emphasising specific attire or changing names. The group was legally constituted in 1988. As of 2020, the organisation has 28 centres and 300-400 Italian members.

=== Matha Gitananda Ashram ===
The Hindu monastery Matha Gitananda Ashram is located atop a hill 520m high in Località Pellegrino, Altare, in the inland of Savona. The ashram was established in 1984 by Swami Yogananda Giri (born Paolo Valle) and serves as the national headquarters of the UII. The ashram follows Saiva Siddhanta and Srividya traditions.

=== International Society for Krishna Consciousness ===
International Society for Krishna Consciousness (ISKCON) arrived in Italy in 1973, opening its first center in Rome. Prabhupada visited Rome in 1974 and gave a public lecture. ISKCON later established centres, rural communities and Govinda vegetarian restaurants in various parts of Italy. In 1998, the Italian government recognized ISKCON as an ente morale ("moral institution").

=== Sathya Sai Baba Organisation ===
The organisation's first centre in Italy was established by an Italian engineer in 1972. As of 2020, the organisation encompasses 26 national centres with over 2000 active members. The Italian branch also communicates its teachings on Radio Sai Italia and runs its own publishing house.

=== Sri Aurobindo ===
Established on Lake Orta in Piedmont in 1978 by German followers of Sri Aurobindo led by Michel Montecrossa, the Mirapuri community focuses on the practice of integral yoga. The community oversees educational projects with children and runs the Mirapuri International Research Academy which hosts lectures on meditation and New Age spirituality.

In 1986, an Italian follower of Sri Aurobindo, Giovanni Tonioni, and his French partner, Mira Alfassa Richard, established The Sri Aurobindo and Mère Centre in Modena. The centre was to emulate Auroville, which Richard established in Pondicherry in 1963. As of 2020, the centre had about twenty residents. The community supports itself through a cooperative, the Germoglio Group, which oversees activities like construction and publication.

=== Sahaja Yoga Movement ===
Nirmala Srivastava introduced her meditation techniques when she came to Rome in 1981. Headquartered at the Cabella Ashram in the Ligurian Apennines, the group had 700 members as of 2020.

=== Babaji Movement ===
The group's first centre opened in 1979 in Cisternino, followed by another centre in Asti (1989). These two sites operated independent of one another until 2008 when Maha Muniraji advised they unify into the Herakhandi Samaj Association.

== Hindu temples ==
Hindu immigrant communities unaffiliated with the Italian Hindu Union oversee about twenty Hindu temples. In 2011, the Temple of Pegognaga, the second largest Hindu temple in Italy at the time after the Matha Gitananda Ashram in Altare, was inaugurated by the consul general of India, Sanjay Kumar Verma. Other temples include the Shri Vishnu Temple in Milan (2011), Maha Shiv Shakti Mandir Temple (2016). A temple was inaugurated in 2017 in Novellara. In Reggio Emilia, a temple dedicated to the goddess Sri Raja Rajeshwari was founded by the Tamil community.

== Contemporary society ==
Under the 2012 law that recognised Hinduism as an official religion, Diwali is designated as the official Hindu religious holiday. Ministers (e.g., swamis) perform Hindu rites of passage (e.g., marriages, funerals) in ashrams and temples.

Over 1 million Italians practise yoga, with 650 Italian books published on yoga between 1909 and 2018. Scholars note the commercialisation of yoga is driven by cultural "ablation" whereby yoga is secularised and removed from its Hindu origins.

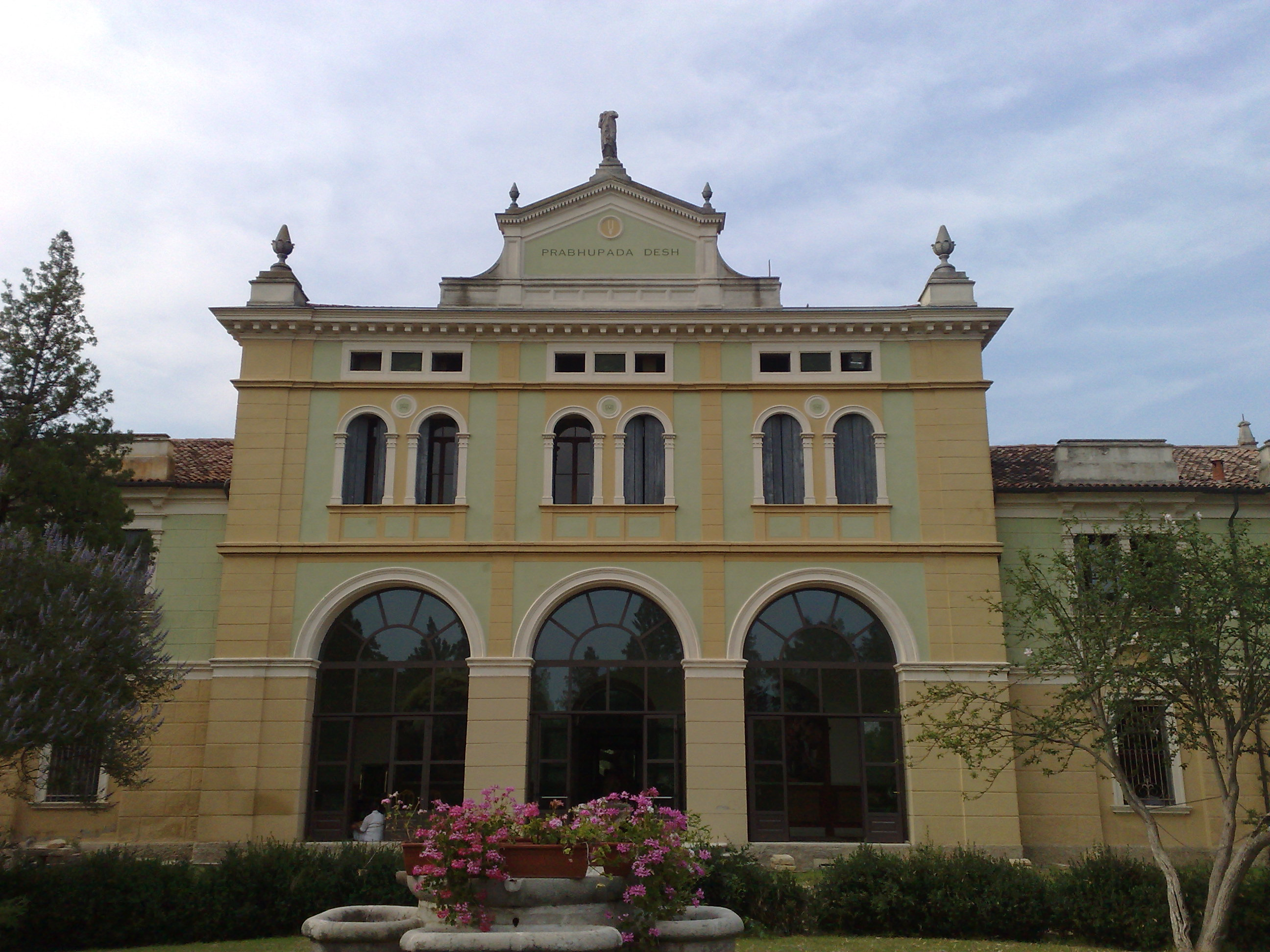
Hare Krishnas Mandir in Albettone, Vicenza.

== See also ==
- Eight per thousand, a taxation scheme supporting organised religion
- Relations
  - Ancient Indo-Roman trade relations
  - India–Italy relations
- Italians in India
- Indians in Italy
  - Tamils in Italy
- Indian religions in Italy
  - Buddhism in Italy
  - Hinduism by country
  - Sikhism in Italy

== Sources ==
- Jacobsen, Knut A.; Sardella, Ferdinando, eds. (2020). Handbook of Hinduism in Europe. Handbook of oriental studies. Section two, South Asia. Vol. 35. Leiden ; Boston: Brill. ISBN 978-90-04-43228-4.
