= Indians in Italy =

Ethnic group

Total population
- 203,052 (January 1, 2022)

Regions with significant populations
- Rome, Milan

Languages
- Italian, English, Languages of India

Religion
- Sikhism, Ravidassia, Hinduism, Religions of India, Christianity

Related ethnic groups
- Non-resident Indian and Person of Indian Origin, Desi, Chinese in Italy, Sri Lankans in Italy, Pakistanis in Italy, Bangladeshis in Italy

Indians in Italy comprise the third largest population of Indians in Europe. Although Italy and India have maintained important relations since ancient times, significant Indian migration to Italy is a recent phenomenon. Many Indians began immigrating to Italy in the early 1990s, when the Italian government initiated programs to get Indian IT professionals and engineers to contribute to the technology sector in Italy. Most Indian immigrants came to Italy legally.

== Analysis ==
Many immigrants came from Punjab as entrepreneurs active in the restaurant and retail fields associated with Italy's large tourism industry. About half of the total Indian migrant population in Italy lives in the central and northern regions of the country, especially in Rome and Milan. Lombardy hosts the most important Indian community with 47,743 people.

Most Indians have retained their religious practices, mainly Hinduism, Ravidassia and Sikhism. There are numerous temples and gurdwaras as well as ISKCON centres. There are also many Christians from Kerala.

According to the research paper of the European University Institute, Fiesole, Italy, the Ravidassia community is the second largest group of Indian diaspora in Italy. The Ravidassia community's migration starts in the early 80s, and currently the community is operating 18 Guru Ravidass temples throughout Italy. But due to the lack of recognized independent religious identity by the Italian government, the local Italian community leaders assume Ravidasias are Hindu or Sikh.

== Dairy industry ==
The production of many Italian cheeses, including Parmigiano-Reggiano, Grana Padano, and mozzarella, depends significantly on immigrant labour. Starting in the 1990s, Indians have come to dominate the labour force of the Italian dairy industry in this niche. 60% of the workers in the Parmesan industry are Sikh.

Most Indians in Italy settle in the north of the country and work in agriculture. The Po Valley is similar in climate to the Punjab, where most of these Sikh workers are from. Their first jobs tend to be directly with the cows and buffalos, as many come from farming families, but some move on to become cheesemakers, which is better paying.

it:Coldiretti, which Politico Europe describes as Italy's most important farming union and civic authorities in the region acknowledge that the immigrants are indispensable for agriculture in general and the dairy industry in particular. The dairy workers themselves (bergamini) tend to belong to the Italian General Confederation of Labour.

== See also ==
- India-Italy relations
- Hinduism in Italy
- Sikhism in Italy
- Italians in India
- Romani people in Italy
- Tamils in Italy
