= Italians in Lebanon =

Italian Lebanese
Italo-libanesi (Italian)
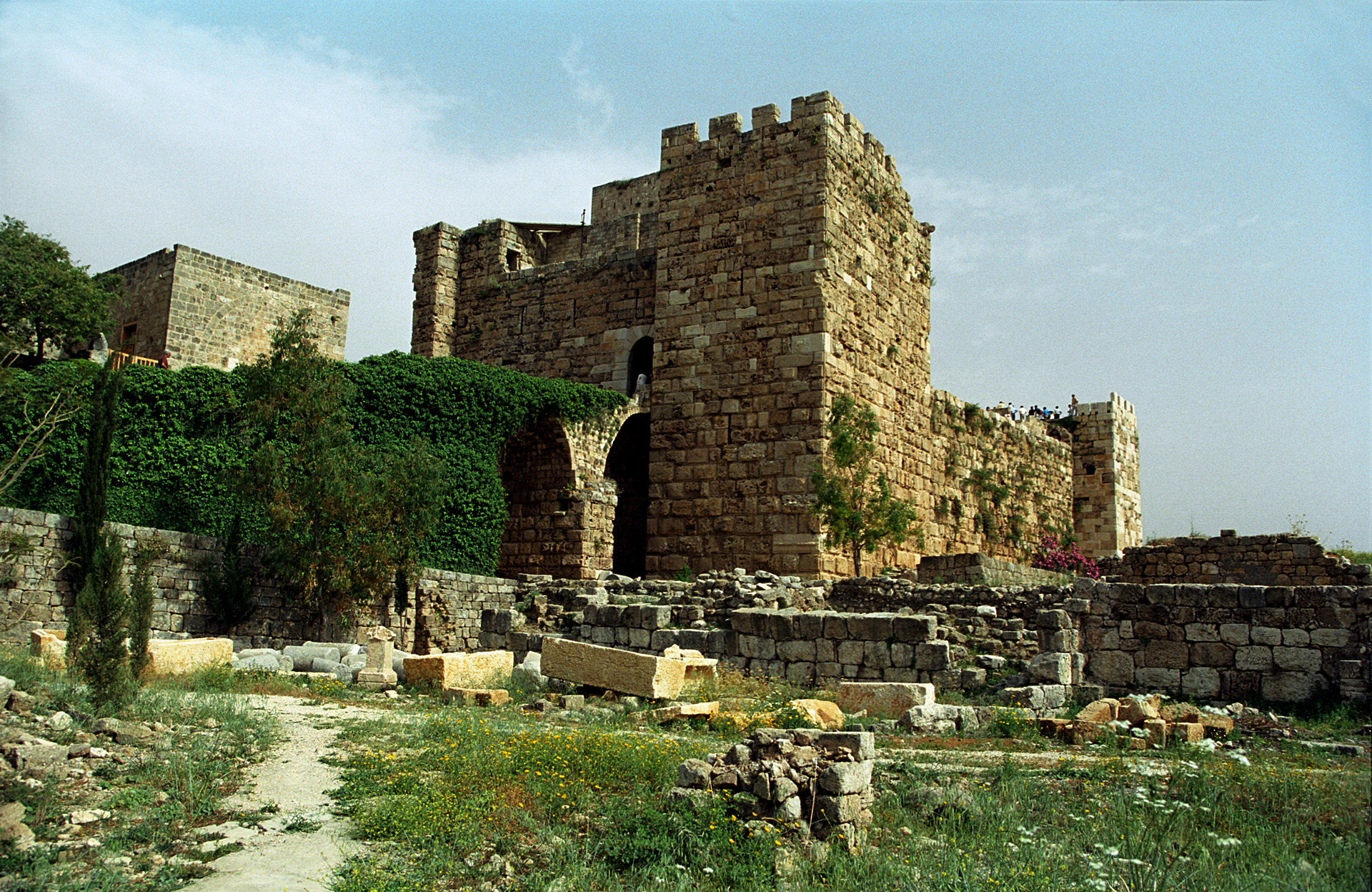
- Genoese crusader castle of Byblos

Total population
- 5,100

Regions with significant populations
- Beirut (Greater Beirut), Tripoli

Languages
- Lebanese Arabic · French · English · Italian and Italian dialects

Religion
- Christian: Mostly Latin Catholic; some Maronite Catholic and Muslim

Related ethnic groups
- Italians, Italian Emiratis, Italian Indians, Italian Levantine

There is a small Italian community in Lebanon (Italian: italo-libanesi, also called Italian Lebanese) consisting mainly of Lebanese citizens of Italian heritage as well with expatriates and migrants from Italy who reside in Lebanon. It is a community with a history that goes back to Roman times.

== History ==
In 64 B.C., the Roman general Pompey added Lebanon to the Roman Republic. During and before this time, Phoenicians and Romans exchanged knowledge, habits, and customs. Indeed, the veterans of two Roman legions were established in the city of "Berytus" (modern Beirut): the fifth Macedonian and the third Gallic. The city quickly became Romanized, with the descendants of those legionaries from the Italian peninsula.

Between the 12th and, 15th centuries the Italian Republic of Genoa had some Genoese colonies in Beirut, Tripoli, and Byblos.

In more recent times the Italians came to Lebanon in small groups during the World War I and World War II, trying to escape the wars at that time in Europe. Some of the first Italians who choose Lebanon as a place to settle and find a refuge were Italian soldiers from the Italo-Turkish War in 1911 to 1912. Also, most of the Italians chose to settle in Beirut, because of its European style of life. Only a few Italians left Lebanon for France after independence.

== Lebanese-Italian relations ==
Lebanon opened a legation in 1946, which was transformed into an embassy in 1955. Both countries signed a Treaty of Friendship, Cooperation and Navigation in 1949. Both countries are members of the Union for the Mediterranean.

Italy and Lebanon are linked by an ancient friendship, which finds its roots in their common Mediterranean heritage, their civilizations and common history, trade relations and cultural and human exchanges. In the 16th century, the relationship between Emir Fakhreddine and the Medici family of Tuscany was instrumental in forging Lebanon as we know it today, which is a mixture of Western and Arabic cultures. Lebanon also left traces in Italy's history: in 1584 the Maronite College was founded in Rome, fostering contacts between clergymen, researchers and students, which today is being continued under the framework of Inter-University cooperation. This level of bilateral relations between Italy and Lebanon is reinforced today by the common views of the two countries on a number of Middle East issues, and by the awareness that in a globalized world the two shores of the Mediterranean sea share the same destiny.

== Italian community in Lebanon ==
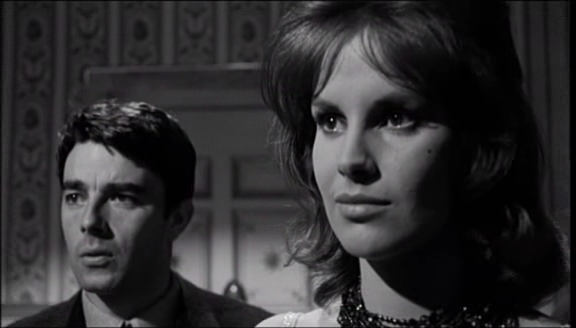
The Italian Lebanese actress Antonella Lualdi in a scene from the film Silver Spoon Set (1960)

The Italian community in Lebanon is very small (about 4,300 people) and it is mostly assimilated into the Lebanese Catholic community.

The intermarriage in the Italian community is very high and most of the younger members are half Italian on the paternal side. In mixed Latin-Maronite or other mixed-rite marriages, the children are raised in the father's rite, and along with bearing the father's surname, identify with the father's ethnic group. Therefore, the children of Italian fathers and Lebanese mothers are counted as Italian, and those of Lebanese fathers and Italian mothers as Lebanese, some last name were modified. There are some Italian families who returned to Italy after World War II together with their Lebanese born children.

There is a growing interest in economic relationships between Italy and Lebanon (like with the "Vinifest 2011"), thanks even to the remaining Italian Lebanese.

== Language and religion ==
Only a small percentage of all remaining Italian Lebanese speak some Italian, while the majority of them speak Arabic as a first language and French and/or English as second language, and are mainly Roman Catholics. Their main organizations are the former Associazione Nazionale Pro Italiani del Libano (ANPIL) and the Istituto Italiano di Cultura di Beirut (IICB).

The Italian Lebanese of the current generations are assimilated to Lebanese society, and most of them speak only Arabic and French and English (only a few young Italian Lebanese know some basic words in Italian). In religion, most of the young generation are Roman Catholics, while only a few young people practise Islam, mainly because of marriage although some are descendants of Italian converts.

== Famous Italian Lebanese ==
- Andrea Paoli, representing Lebanon in Taekwondo at the 2012 Olympic Games held in London
- Philippe Paoli, a Lebanese footballer
- Antonella Lualdi, international actress
- Bruno Carmeni, judoka
- Luca Turin, biophysicist and expert in the art of perfume and fragrance
- Natasha Hovey, actress (born in Beirut, her mother is Italian Lebanese)

See also List of Lebanese people in Italy

== See also ==
- Latin Church in Lebanon
- Lebanon
- Italy
- Italian Empire
- Imperial Italy
- Italy–Lebanon relations
- Italian diaspora
- Roman Lebanon
- Latin Church in the Middle East

== Bibliography ==
- Consorti, A. Vicende dell’italianità in Levante, 1815-1915 in: Rivista Coloniale, anno XV.
- Corm, Georges. Il Libano contemporaneo, storia e società. Jaca Book. Milano, 2006
- Favero, Luigi e Tassello, Graziano. Cent'anni di emigrazione italiana (1876-1976). Cser. Roma, 1978.
- Miller, William. The Latin Orient. Bibliobazaar LLC. London, 2009 ISBN 1-110-86390-X.
- Ossian De negri, Teofilo. Storia di Genova: Mediterraneo, Europa, Atlantico. Giunti Editore. Firenze, 2003. ISBN 9788809029323
- Touma, Toufic. Paysans et institutions féodales chez les Druses et les Maronites du Liban du XVIIe siècle à 1914. Publications de l'Université Libanaise. Beyrouth, 1971.; 1972
