= Italians in the United Arab Emirates =

Emirati citizens of Italian descent

Italian Emiratis
Italo-emiratini (Italian)

Total population
- 10,000

Regions with significant populations
- Abu Dhabi · Dubai

Languages
- Italian and Italian dialects · Emirati Arabic · English

Religion
- Roman Catholicism

Related ethnic groups
- Italians, Italian Indians, Italian Lebanese, Italian Levantine

There are up to 10,000 Italians in the United Arab Emirates approximately two-thirds of whom are in Dubai, and the rest in Abu Dhabi. The United Arab Emirates in recent years has attained the status of a favourite destination for Italian immigrants, with the rate of Italians moving into the country having increased by forty percent between 2005 and 2007.

== Relations ==
Italians make up one of the largest European groups in the United Arab Emirates. In September 2007, after being awarded the Italian Stella Re prize, the UAE minister for economy Sheikha Lubna Khalid Al Qasimi described the interest of the UAE government in boosting cultural and economic ties with Italy: "With thousands of expatriate Italians living in the UAE, our governments are continuing to actively promote bilateral investments and increase the opportunities for further cooperation between our two countries."

== Social life ==
The community is structured through numerous social circles and organisations such as the Italian Cultural and Recreational Circle (now known as "Cicer"), the Italian Industry and Commerce Office (UAE) and the Italian Business Council Dubai. Social activities like outdoor excursions, gastronomy evenings, language courses, activities for children, exhibitions and concerts are frequent; there have been talks of setting up a permanent Italian cultural centre in Abu Dhabi which would act as a venue for activities.

Italian cuisine, culture, and fashion are widespread throughout Dubai and Abu Dhabi, with a large number of native Italians running restaurants. In 2008, the Italian embassy in Abu Dhabi arranged an exhibition of the 2006 FIFA World Cup trophy (won by Italy) to celebrate Festa della Repubblica, the national day of Italy; the rare reception was organised in the Emirates Palace hotel.

== See also ==
- Ferrari World
- Italy–United Arab Emirates relations
