= Italians in India =

Indian citizens of Italian descent

Italo-indiani (Italian)

Total population
- 15,000 - 20,000

Regions with significant populations
- Delhi · Bangalore · Mumbai · Hyderabad · Chennai

Languages
- Indian English · Italian and Italian dialects · Languages of India

Religion
- Roman Catholicism · Hinduism

Related ethnic groups
- Italians, Italian Emiratis, Italian Lebanese, Italian Levantine

There is a small Italian community in India (Italian: italo-indiani, also called Italian Indians) consisting mainly of Indian citizens of Italian heritage as well with expatriates and migrants from Italy who reside in India.

== Migration history ==
Since Roman times, people from the Italian peninsula moved to India mainly as merchants. During the Middle Ages, the first Italians to arrive in India were Jesuits and Christian missionaries.

Since the 16th century, many of these Italian Jesuits came to South India, mainly Goa, Kerala and Tamil Nadu. Some of the most well known Jesuits in India include Antonio Moscheni, Constanzo Beschi, Roberto de Nobili and Rodolfo Acquaviva

In the 1940s, during World War II, the British brought Italian prisoners of war, who were captured in either Europe or North Africa, to Bangalore and Madras. They were put up at the Garrison Grounds, today's Parade Grounds-Cubbon Road area. In February 1941, about 2,200 Italian prisoners of war arrived in Bangalore by a special train and marched to internment camps at Byramangala, 20 miles from Bangalore.

In recent years, many Italians have been coming to India for business purposes. Today, Italy is India's fifth largest trading partner in the European Union. The Italian government has already identified India as a priority country and, in particular, as the Focus Country for 2007 and there are several Italian companies currently doing business in India. Many Italian expatriates in India therefore tend to be entrepreneurs from multi-national companies. In addition, there are some students. Italy also maintains an active diplomatic presence in India; apart from an embassy in Delhi, it has consulates in Goa, Mumbai and Kolkata.

There are currently between 15,000 to 20,000 Italian nationals in India based mostly in South India. The city of Mumbai itself has a sizeable number of Italians and some in Chennai.

== Notable people ==
Sonia Gandhi née Maino is an Indian politician born in Lusiana near Veneto (northern Italy) and served as the President of the Indian National Congress. Sonia Gandhi married into the influential Nehru-Gandhi family and is the daughter-in-law of former Prime Minister of India Indira Gandhi and the widow of former Prime Minister Rajiv Gandhi. After the assassination of Rajiv Gandhi in 1991, she initially shunned politics, only to be elected as the leader of the INC in 1998. In September 2010, on being re-elected for the fourth time, she became the longest serving president in the 125-year history of the Congress.

Other notable Indians of Italian birth or descent include:

- Shiva Keshavan - Indian luger
- Dino Morea - Indian actor
- Ileana Citaristi - Odissi dancer
- Lekha Washington - Indian film actress and model
- Alessia Dipol - Italian-born Togolese alpine skier who formerly represented India (2011–2013)
- Giorgia Andriani - Bollywood actress born in Apulia, Italy.
- Rahul Gandhi
- Priyanka Gandhi

== See also ==
- India–Italy relations
- Enrica Lexie case
- Indians in Italy
- Hinduism in Italy
