= List of ambassadors of Italy to the United Arab Emirates =

Ambassador of Italy to the United Arab Emirates
- Ambasciatore d’Italia negli Emirati Arabi Uniti
- Emblem of Italy
- Incumbent; Lorenzo Fanara since October 12, 2022
- Style: His/Her Excellency
- Seat: Embassy of Italy, Abu Dhabi
- Inaugural holder: Antonio Napolitano
- Formation: June 10, 1979
- Website: Ambasciata d'Italia Abu Dhabi

The Ambassador of Italy to the United Arab Emirates (in arabic: سفير الأيطاليا في الإمارات العربية المتحدة) is Italy's foremost diplomatic representative in the United Arab Emirates, and head of Italy's diplomatic mission to the United Arab Emirates. The current ambassador is Lorenzo Fanara, who presentend his credentials on October 12, 2022.

== List ==
The following is a list of Italian ambassadors to the United Arab Emirates.

Name	Presentation	Termination
Antonio Napolitano	June 10, 1979	December 2, 1982
Luca Biolato	January 16, 1983	July 6, 1987
Enrico De Maio	July 23, 1987	March 25, 1990
Giovanni Ferrero	May 7, 1990	February 9, 1994
Pietro Cordone	March 9, 1995	January 31, 1998
Ranieri Fornari	February 1, 1998	January 31, 2002
Domenico Pedata	February 23, 2002	June 29, 2006
Paolo Dionisi	July 4, 2006	September 29, 2010
Giorgio Starace	September 30, 2010	June 4, 2015
Liborio Stellino	June 29, 2015	September 30, 2019
Nicola Lener	October 1, 2019	September 14, 2022
Lorenzo Fanara	October 12, 2022	Incumbent

== See also ==
- Italy–United Arab Emirates relations
