= Giovanni Scognamillo =

Turkish Levantine film critic

Giovanni Scognamillo (25 April 1929 – 8 October 2016) was a Turkish Levantine film critic.

Scognamillo was born to a family of Italian Levantines; his father was the son of an immigrant from Naples and his mother was descended from Genoese settlers of Tinos. As his father, Leone, was the manager of the prestigious movie theatre Elhamra Sineması of Beyoğlu, Scognamillo became acquainted with cinema in early years of his life. After graduation from Liceo Italiano, he started to write cinema articles for various Italian-language media. By 1961, he began his career in Turkish language press.

Scognamillo is the author of several books on the history of cinema, including Turk Sinema Tarihi, Birinci Cilt, 1896-1959, as well as diverse topics such as fantastique and occultism.
