= Italy–United Arab Emirates relations =

- Italy: United Arab Emirates

Diplomatic mission
- Embassy of Italy, Abu Dhabi: Embassy of the United Arab Emirates, Rome

Envoy
- Ambassador Lorenzo Fanara: Ambassador Abdulla Ali AlSubousi

Italy and the United Arab Emirates (UAE) enjoy good diplomatic relations. Italy has an embassy in Abu Dhabi and a consulate-general in Dubai. The UAE has an embassy in Rome.

== History ==
Italy and the United Arab Emirates established diplomatic relationships in 1971, with Italy opening its embassy in Abu Dhabi in 1979, and the UAE opening its embassy in Rome in 1981. In 2021, Italy opened an Italian Cultural Institute in Abu Dhabi to promote the Italian language and culture and to organize events centered around Italy.

A diplomatic rift between Italy and the United Arab Emirates arose when the first Conte government partially suspended arm sales to the UAE in 2019, due to the UAE's involvement in the Yemeni civil war, with the second Conte government finally halting them in January 2021. In June of the same year, the Emirati government responded by ordering the withdrawal of all Italian aircraft and personnel from the Al Minhad Air Base. In July 2021, the Draghi government partially lifted the arms embargo, which was ultimately fully revoked in April 2023 by the Meloni government.

The first state visit exchanged between Italy and the United Arab Emirates occurred in February 2025, when the president of the UAE Mohamed bin Zayed Al Nahyan visited Rome. In that context, Meloni and Mohamed signed multiple agreements, for a total of a $40 billion investment deal, to expand cooperation in areas including aerospace, defense, and energy. These agreements signaled an improvement in the relations between Italy and the UAE after the 2021 diplomatic incidents.

== Trade ==
In 2024, bilateral trade between Italy and the United Arab Emirates reached €9.9 billion, with Italian export to the UAE accounting for €7.9 billion.

== Resident diplomatic missions ==
- Italy has an embassy in Abu Dhabi and a consulate-general in Dubai.
- The United Arab Emirates has an embassy in Rome.

== See also ==
- Italians in the United Arab Emirates
- List of ambassadors of Italy to the United Arab Emirates
- India–Middle East–Europe Economic Corridor
