= Vani Sarraju Rao =

Indian diplomat

Vani Sarraju Rao is an Indian career diplomat who was appointed the Ambassador of India to Italy, San Marino and Permanent Representative to UN entities in Rome on the 27 October 2023. She took office on 3 April 2024 and presented her credentials to President Sergio Mattarella on 23 April 2024.

== Education ==
Rao studied political science at the University of Hyderabad and environmental studies at San Jose State University. She speaks English, Telugu, Hindi and Spanish.

== Career ==
Rao previously served as Ambassador to Finland and Estonia from 2017 to 2020, becoming the first Telugu woman to be appointed as an ambassador. Prior to that she served in Israel as Deputy Chief of Mission, and in Mexico and Sweden.
