= Italy–Lebanon relations =

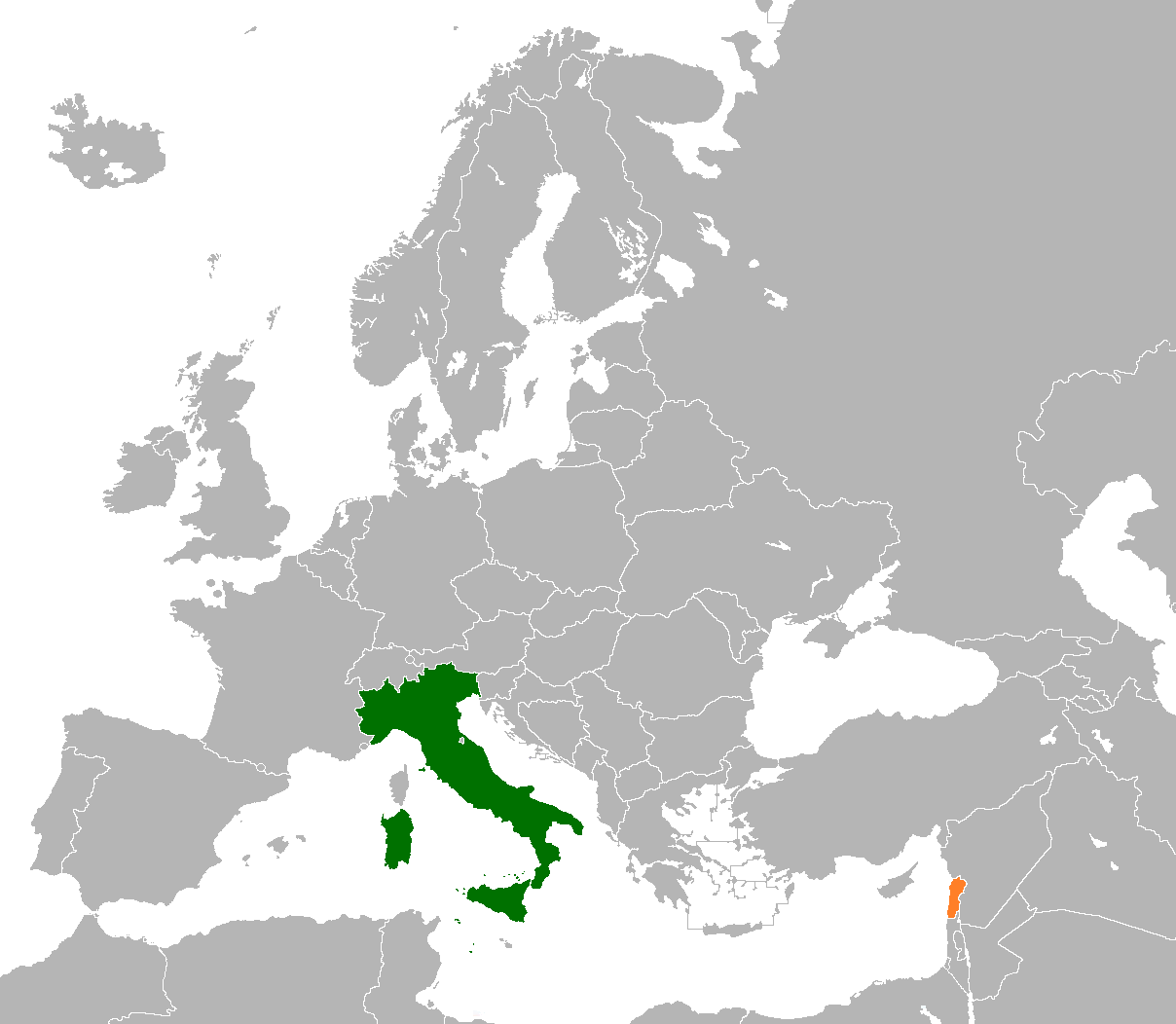
- Italy: Lebanon

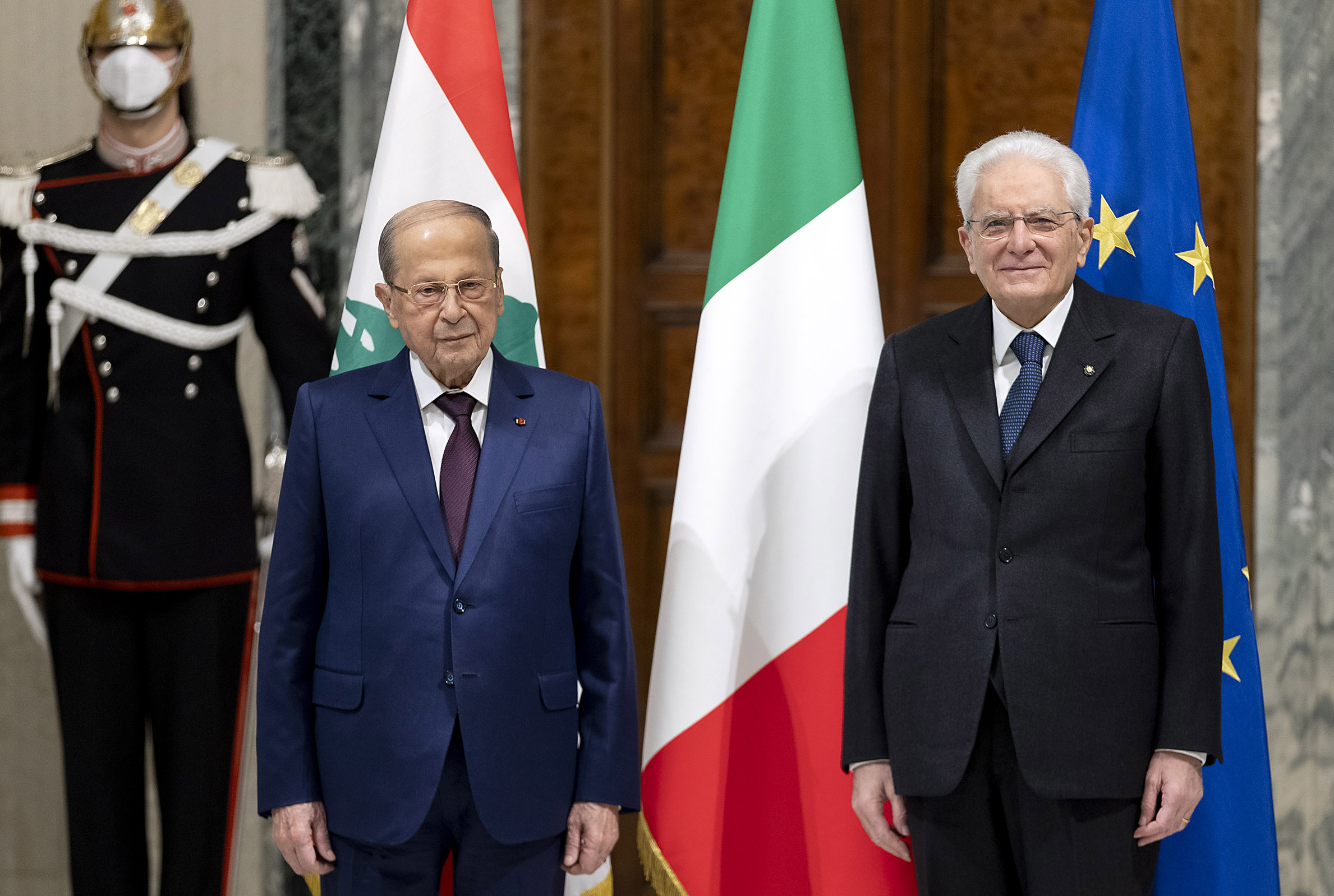
Sergio Mattarella with Lebanese president Michel Aoun in Rome, 2022

Italy–Lebanon relations (Italian: relazioni bilaterali tra Italia e Libano, Arabic: العلاقات الإيطالية اللبنانية) are relations between Italy and Lebanon. Both countries are members of the Union for the Mediterranean. Lebanese-Italian relations go back to ancient times. Phoenicians traded Tyrian purple (which was extremely valuable and rare), Phoenician wine, olive oil and cedar wood with Romans.

== History ==
In 64 B.C., the Roman general Pompey added Lebanon to the Roman Republic. During and before this time, Phoenicians and Romans exchanged knowledge, habits, and customs.

Lebanon opened a legation in 1946, which was transformed into an embassy in 1955. Both countries signed a Treaty of Friendship, Cooperation and Navigation in 1949. The Italian Cultural Institute of Beirut (Istituto Italiano di Cultura di Beirut) is located on the ground floor of the Embassy in the suburb of Baabda.

== Official visits ==
In April 2014, Italian Defense Minister Roberta Pinotti visited Lebanese President Michel Sleiman and Prime Minister Tammam Salam to discuss international support for the Lebanese Armed Forces.

== Economic relations ==
In 2019, the volume of trade between Italy and Lebanon amounted to $1.35 billion, with Italy exporting $1.31 billion worth of goods to Lebanon and Lebanon exporting $39.8 million worth of goods to Italy.

Italy's main export to Lebanon is refined oil (41.5%), with jewellery (5.01%) and eyewear (1.98%) also among the most-exported products from Italy. Lebanon's main export to Italy are scrap copper (24.8%) and phosphoric acid (24.5%), with other notable exports being gold (6.76%) and scrap aluminium (5.85%).

== Italian aid to Lebanon ==
The Italian Government supported the reconstruction of Lebanon after the Taef Agreement.

In December 2013, the Italian Government announced increased funding to Lebanon to assist Lebanon in dealing with refugees fleeing the Syrian Civil War. Italy also announced a rescue mission with five to seven ships to rescue thousands of migrants, mostly Syrians, in the Mediterranean Sea.

In 2023, Italy reaffirmed its commitment to ensuring stability in Lebanon and descalating conflict in Lebanon which had led to an increase in migration from Lebanon to Europe.

== Resident diplomatic missions ==
- Italy has an embassy in Beirut.
- Lebanon has an embassy in Rome and consulate-general in Milan.

== See also ==
- Foreign relations of Italy
- Foreign relations of Lebanon
- Italians in Lebanon
- Arabs in Italy

== Bibliography ==
- Giampaolo Conte: Economic Relationship between Italy and Lebanon in the Fifties, in: "Oriente Moderno", v. 94, issue 1, pp 99–112.
