= Latin Church in the Middle East =

Latin Catholicism in the Middle East

- Dioceses of the Latin Church in the Middle East
- Countries and regions: Cyprus Palestine; Israel; Jordan; Lebanon; Syria; Turkey (Hatay Province) Broader definition: Egypt; Greece; Iraq; Cyrenaica (Libya); Turkey
- Demonym: Latin Catholics, Levantines
- Languages: Levantine Arabic, Hebrew, Aramaic, Armenian, Circassian, Greek, Kurdish, Ladino, Turkish, Domari
- Time Zones: UTC+02:00 (EET) ( Cyprus)
- Largest cities: Damascus; Amman; Aleppo; Beirut; Gaza; Jerusalem; Tel Aviv

The Latin Church of the Catholic Church has several dispersed populations of members in the Middle East, notably in Turkey, Cyprus and the Levant (Syria, Lebanon, Palestine, Israel, and Jordan). Latin Catholics employ the Latin liturgical rites, in contrast to Eastern Catholics who fall under their respective church's patriarchs and employ distinct Eastern Catholic liturgies, while being in full communion with the worldwide Catholic Church.

Depending on the specific area in question, due to their cultural heritage descending from Catholics who lived under the Ottoman Empire, they are sometimes referred to as Levantines, Italo-Levantines, or Franco-Levantines (Arabic: شوام; French: Levantins; Italian: Levantini; Greek: Φραγκολεβαντίνοι Frankolevantini; Turkish: Levantenler or Tatlısu Frenkleri) after Frankokratia.

A distinctive era of influence occurred during the Crusades with the establishment of the Kingdom of Jerusalem during the Middle Ages. As with the case of Eastern Catholics and other Christians in the Middle East, Latin Catholics have both a history and a present of persecution.

== History ==
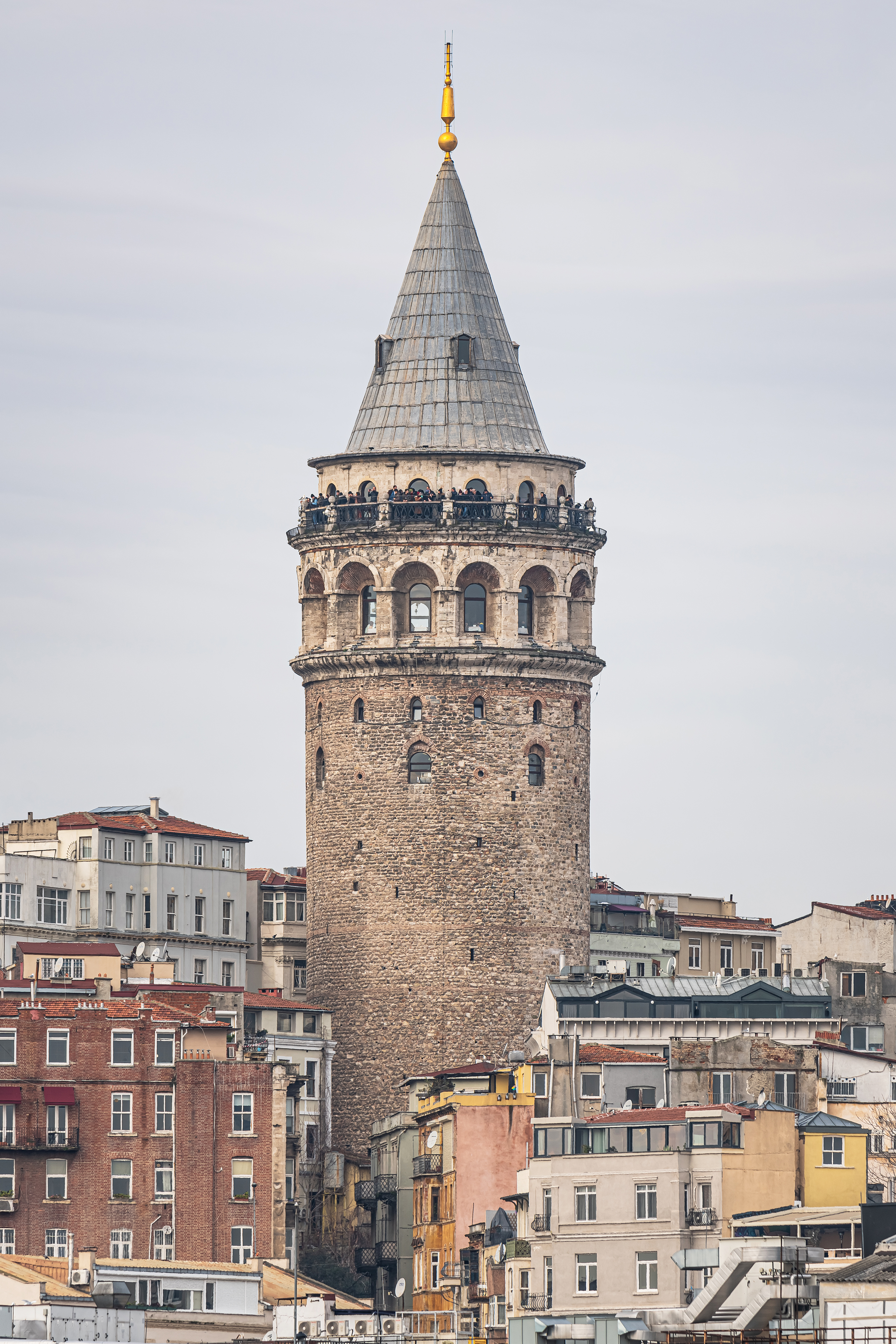
Galata Tower, built in 1348 by the Republic of Genoa in the citadel of Galata (modern Karaköy) on the northern shore of the Golden Horn, across Constantinople (Fatih) on the southern shore, is one of the most famous architectural landmarks of the Italian Levantine community in Istanbul.

Levantines were mostly of Italian (especially Venetian and Pisan), French, or other Euro-Mediterranean origin. They have been living in the eastern Mediterranean coast of Lebanon and Syria since the middle Byzantine or the Ottoman era and in Constantinople (Istanbul), Smyrna (İzmir) and other parts of Anatolia (such as the port towns of Amasra, Sinop, Trabzon, Enez, Çanakkale, Foça, Çeşme, Bodrum, Alanya, Mersin, Iskenderun, etc., where the colonies of Genoese and Venetian merchants existed) in present-day Turkey.

The majority are either the descendants of traders from the maritime republics of Venice, Genoa, Pisa, Ancona and Ragusa who had colonies in the East Mediterranean coast; or the descendants of the French/Italian Levantines who lived in the Crusader states of the Levant (in present-day Lebanon, Israel, Palestine and Syria), especially in port towns such as Beirut, Tripoli, Tyre, Byblos, Acre, Jaffa, Latakia, etc.; or in major cities near the coast, such as Tarsus, Antioch, Jerusalem, etc. Others may be converts to Catholicism, immigrants from Anglo-French colonization, or Eastern Christians who had resided there for centuries.

== Levant ==
When the United Kingdom took over the southern portion of Ottoman Syria in the aftermath of the First World War, some of the new rulers adapted the term "Levantine" pejoratively to refer to the inhabitants of mixed Arab and European descent in Lebanon, Syria and Palestine, and to Europeans (usually French, Italian or Greek) who had assimilated and adopted local dress and customs.

Today, a small percentage of Lebanon's small group of Latin Catholics are of at least partial French/Italian descent.

== Cyprus ==
The Catholic community of Cyprus (Latinoi, Λατίνοι) consists one of the three recognized religious minorities of Cyprus, together with the Armenians and Maronites, according to the 1960 constitution.

== Turkey ==
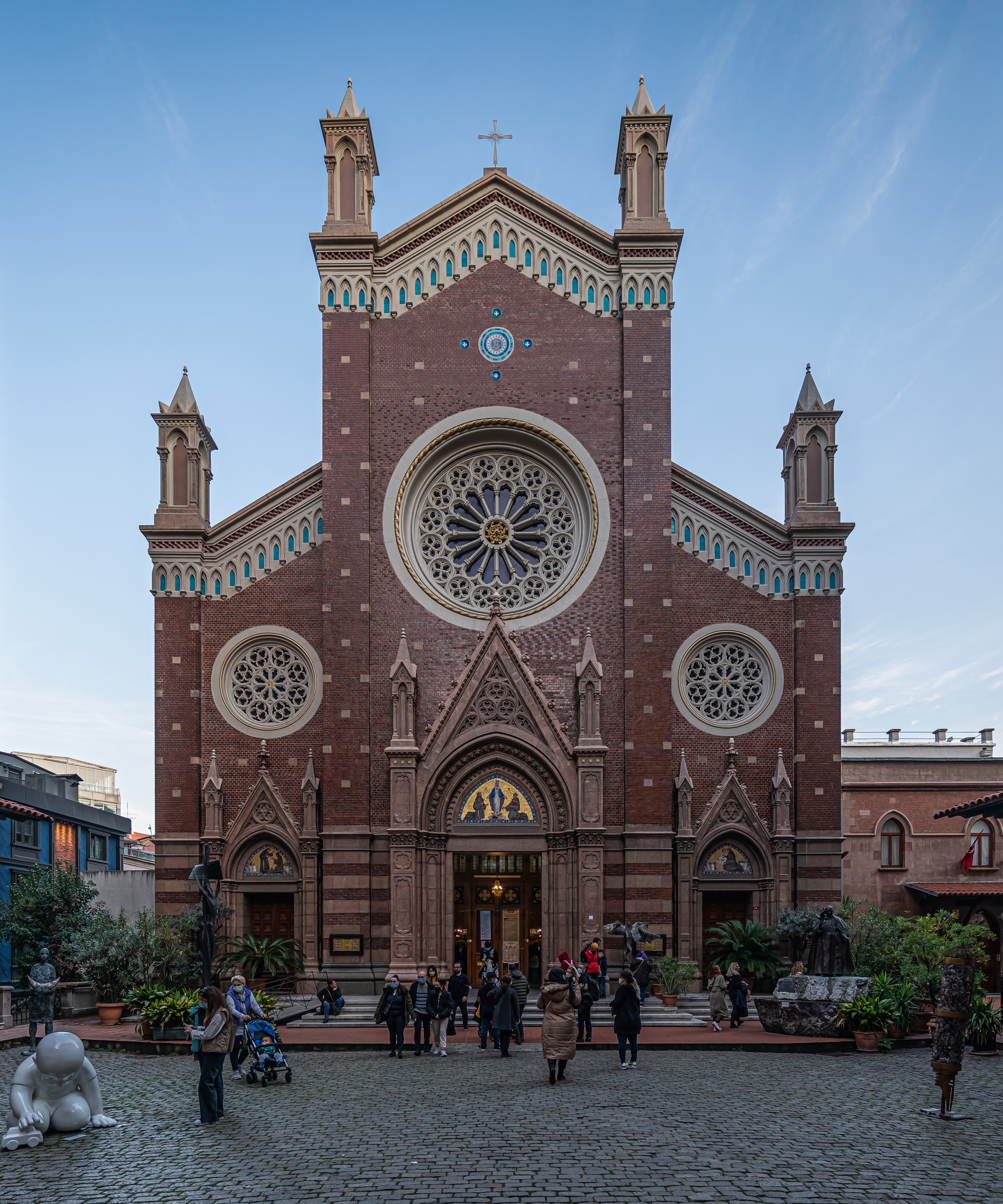
Church of St. Anthony of Padua on İstiklal Avenue in the Beyoğlu (Pera) district of Istanbul, which was constructed between 1906 and 1912 by the city's Italian Levantine community.

Circa 2013 about 35,000 Levantines live in Turkey.

The name Italo-Levantine is specifically applied to people of Italian (especially Venetian or Genoese) origin, but even with some French or other Euro-Mediterranean roots, who have lived in Istanbul, İzmir and other parts of Anatolia in Turkey. Some of the Italian Levantines may have ancestral origins also in the eastern Mediterranean coast (the Levant, particularly in present-day Lebanon and Israel) dating back to the period of the Crusades and the Byzantine Empire. A small group came from Crimea and from the Genoese colonies in the Black Sea, after the Fall of Constantinople in 1453.

The majority of the Levantines in modern Turkey are the descendants of traders/colonists from the Italian maritime republics of the Mediterranean (especially Genoa and Venice) and France, who obtained special rights and privileges called the Capitulations from the Ottoman sultans in the 16th century.

There are two large communities of Italian Levantines: one in Istanbul and the other in İzmir. At the end of the 19th century there were nearly 6,000 Levantines of Italian roots in İzmir. They came mainly from the nearby Genoese island of Chios in the Aegean Sea.

The community had more than 15,000 members during Atatürk's presidency in the 1920s and 1930s, but today is reduced to only a few hundreds, according to Italian Levantine writer Giovanni Scognamillo.

They continue to live in Istanbul (mostly in the districts of Karaköy, Beyoğlu and Nişantaşı), and İzmir (mostly in the districts of Karşıyaka, Bornova and Buca.)

The largest Catholic church in Turkey is the Church of St. Anthony of Padua on İstiklal Avenue in the Beyoğlu (Pera) district of Istanbul, which was constructed between 1906 and 1912 by the Italian Levantine community.

They have been influential in creating and reviving a tradition of opera. Famous people of the present-day Levantine community in Turkey include Maria Rita Epik, Franco-Levantine Caroline Giraud Koç and Italo-Levantine Giovanni Scognamillo. Most of Turkey's small Catholic community are Levantines.

=== Notable people ===
Notable people of the Italian Levantine community in Turkey include:

- Sir Alfred Biliotti, who joined the British foreign service and eventually rose to become one of its most distinguished consular officers in the late 19th century. Biliotti was also an accomplished archaeologist who conducted important excavations at sites in the Aegean and Anatolia.
- Livio Missir di Lusignano. Historian. His masterpiece is Les anciennes familles italiennes de Turquie.
- Giuseppe Donizetti, born in Bergamo, Italy, musician. He was Instructor General of the Imperial Ottoman Music at the court of Sultan Mahmud II.
- Giovanni Scognamillo, writer. He composed "Memorie di Beyoğlu di un Levantino" in 1989.

== See also ==
- Latin Empire of Constantinople
- Catholic Church in the Middle East
  - Catholic Church in Syria
  - Catholic Church in Turkey
- Italian Lebanese
- French Lebanese
- Embriaco family
- House of Lusignan
- House of Camondo
- Enrico Dandolo
- Gattilusi
- Bailo
- Bailo of Constantinople
- Andrea Gritti
- Alvise Gritti
- Cigalazade Yusuf Sinan Pasha
- Cağaloğlu
- Hekimoğlu Ali Pasha
- Alexander Vallaury
- Raimondo Tommaso D'Aronco
