= Bruno Carmeni =

Italian judoka

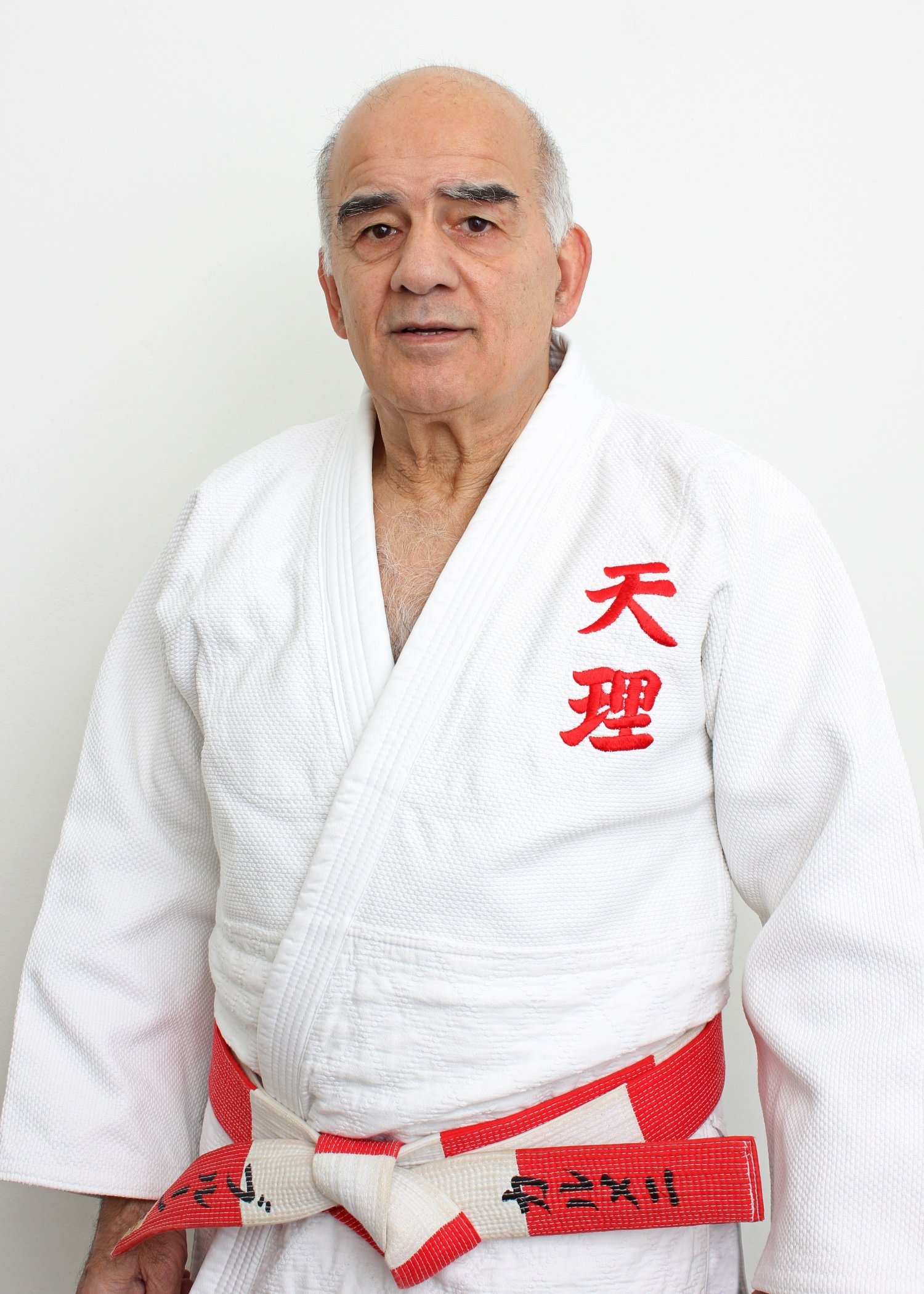
- Born: 29 December 1940 (age 85); Beirut, Lebanon
- Nationality: (Italy) Italian
- Height: 5 ft 7 in (1.70 m)
- Weight: 178 lb (81 kg; 12.7 st)
- Division: Middleweight
- Style: Judo
- Rank: black belt 8th Dan
- Years active: 60

Bruno Carmeni (born 29 December 1940, in Beirut, Lebanon) is an Italian judoka, who started training judo in 1955. He competed at the 1964 Summer Olympics.

== Early life ==
At the age of fifteen (1955), some friends asked him to come to judo with them. This is how he started at the club of Fiamma Yamato located in via Corvieri in Rome (Italy). He had several masters, among which Vittorio Porceddu, Elio Paci, Vinicio Volpi and last but not least Noritomo Ken Otani. Thanks to the latter, he was introduced to a judo form much closer to the original Japanese one, allowing him to perfect his judo techniques. Thanks to the skill of this master, he learnt to understand the term Do, the way that allowed him to reach several goals. Already in 1960, he had his first results by winning the silver medal at the Italian Championships for blue and brown belts, allowing him to open the doors in order to get into the Italian National Squad. In the same year, he got his black belt 1st dan. He continued to win at many National and Regional Tournaments and was noticed by the Federal Sports Director, who called him to participate in several training sessions of the National Team. In 1961, he voluntarily entered the Police at the Sports Centre of the Fiamme Oro (Gold Flame, State Police) and was sent to the Sports Centre of Nettuno. Here he perfected further his judo techniques, thanks to the contribution of master Otani, and this allowed him to win the first Italian Title in the up to 68 kg weight division in Perugia. In the afternoon of the same day, he also won the Silver medal in the open weight division. Another six National Titles follow after this first time in Perugia.

== Competitor ==
He is 21 21-time member of the Italian National Team and has participated in 8 European Championships. In 1963, he won the Silver Medal at the European Championships in Geneva (Switzerland), becoming the first Italian lightweight in Italian judo history to reach this goal. The Italian National Olympic Committee adds him to the list of “Probable Olympians” for the 1964 Tokyo Olympics. He participates in this first-time judo event at the Olympic Games along with Nicola Tempesta (the only two Italians who participated in judo). After the competition at the Olympics he becomes a member of the team "Rest of the World”, touring Japan to fight against Japanese teams in Tokyo, Tenri, Nagoya, Yokohama, and Fukuoka, where he places first. Thanks to the help of master Ken Otani, he got a scholarship to enter the University of Tenri (Nara). He remained in Japan for two years studying judo and the Japanese language, getting a diploma in the latter. During his stay there, he has had the chance to study under several outstanding masters, among which Ken Otani (9th dan), Kotani (10th dan), Ebii (9th dan), Matsumoto (9th dan), Daigo (9th dan), Osawa (8th dan) and Hashimoto (8th dan). He returned to Italy in 1966, where he won other National Titles and several silver and bronze medals; in total, he participated in 44 National Championships.

== Trainer ==
In 1970, he quit competitions and became the first trainer of the Junior National Team and then of the Senior Team, followed by the University Team and the National Visually Impaired one, belonging to the National Blind Sports Federation (FICS), later called Italian Federation of Disabled Sport (FISD). Later, he becomes the National Sports Director of the latter. In 1971, the Italian National Judo Academy was founded, of which he was the first teacher. He is elected to the Council of the Technical Teachers Order of the Federation, and after that, is part of several National Technical Commissions in order to define the technical programs for grading and qualification and also for teaching.

== International career ==
In 1987, he was nominated Chairman for Judo within the International Blind Sport Association (IBSA), a position that he has held for five four-year Olympic periods. He also became a member of the International Paralympic Committee. He tours the world for conferences, technical and pedagogical updating courses. He has contacts and meetings with the International Judo Federation and the Continental Judo Unions, in which he promotes the cause of the Visually Impaired Athletes under the slogan “disability maximum ability”. He was a Technical Delegate at the following Paralympic Games: Seoul (1988), Barcelona (1992), Atlanta (1996), Sydney (2000), Athens (2004) and VIP Guest at Beijing (2008)and London (2012). He is the Director at 11 World Championships, 13 Europeans and 2 Asian Games. He has received many National and International awards, among which are: Knight to the Merit of the Italian Republic, Gold Star of the National Italian Olympic Committee, Gold Star of the Olympic Committee of the Russian Confederation as first foreigner honoured by such award, Ambassador of USA Judo, awards from the Olympic Committees of Algeria, China and Libya. He received the International Cultural and Sport Lions Club prize, the Bronze Medal from the International Judo Federation and the Honours Medal from the Italian National Judo Federation (FIJLKAM). He is a Well-deserving and International Referee, a Well-deserving Master. He received a special motion from the University of Fighting Arts, the Yong In University, Korea. In 2018, the FIJLKAM Chairman awarded him with the 9th dan, one of the highest recognitions both nationally and internationally. He has written many technical books, which deal with judo teaching methods for kids, grading systems, judo’s pedagogy and psychology, judo’s culture, the kata, sensorial disabled athletes and their integration thanks to the practice of judo. His books have been translated into English, Spanish, Arabic, Braille and mentioned all around the world. In 2007, he was nominated technical consultant of the Visually Impaired Chinese National Judo Team for the Beijing 2008 Paralympics. Thanks to the outstanding teaching method in favour of the members of the American Police, he was nominated Honor Member of the New Jersey Police (USA). At the Judo World Championships, which took place in São Paulo (Brazil) in June 2007, he won two Silver medals (weight division and open). In 2018, he was awarded by the Association of the National Police Treviso Section and by the CONCILIO DE MAESTROS DE LAS ARTES MARCIALES in Cartagena, Spain.

He teaches and is the Sport Director of the ASD Judo Club Conegliano, Treviso (Italy).

Throughout the years, he has maintained his strong bond to Japan, and since 2006, he has been there regularly once or twice a year. In 2010, the idea to open a Japanese Cultural Centre at the Judo Club Conegliano was conceived, thus promoting activities such as Japanese Language, Ikebana, Taiko and more. In 2012, he reached an agreement with the Judo Headquarters in Tenri, becoming Tenri Judo Conegliano.
