= Sikhism in Italy =

Religious minority in Italy

Sikhism in Italy Sikhismo in Italia

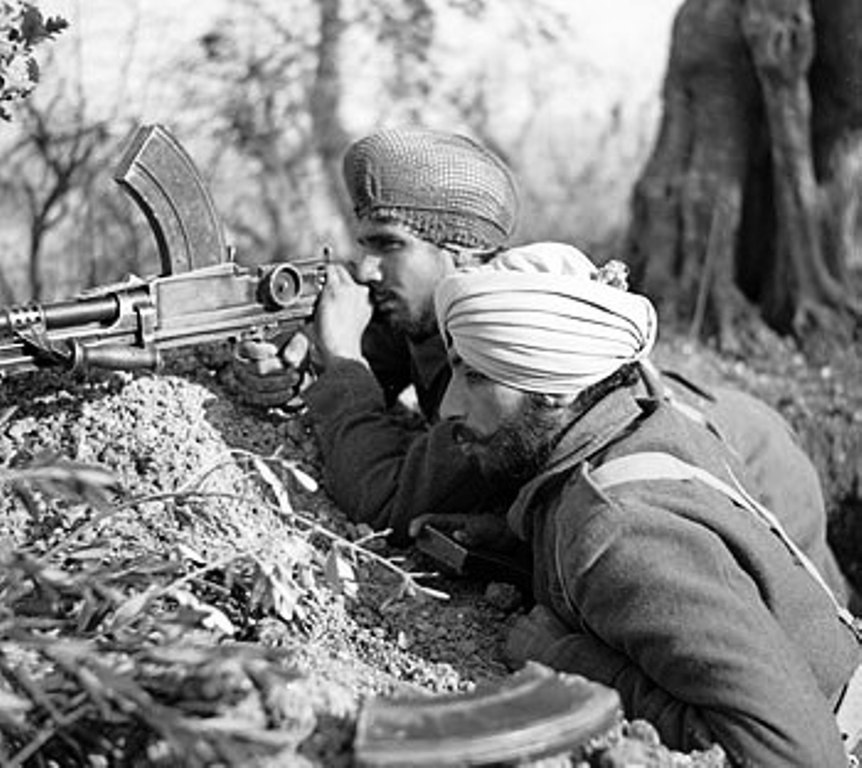
- Two Sikh soldiers using a Bren light machine gun in the World War II (Italian campaign) near Villa Grande (15 January 1944)

Total population
- 220,000; 0.3% of the total Italian population

Regions with significant populations
- Reggio Emilia · Brescia · Verona · Lazio

Religions
- Sikhism

Languages
- Punjabi · Italian; Venetian • Neapolitan • Hindi • Urdu

Italian Sikhs are a growing religious minority in Italy, which has the second biggest Sikh population in Europe after the United Kingdom (535,000) and sixth largest number of Sikhs in the world. It is estimated that there are 220,000 Sikhs in Italy, constituting 0.3% of the total Italian population.

== History ==
=== Sikh Gurus ===
One of the earliest documented interactions of Italians and Sikhs was in 1708, when Niccolao Manucci, a Venetian doctor who practiced medicine in Lahore, is "reported" to have attended Guru Gobind Singh to treat a stab wound during his final days in Nanded, India. However this claim is a point of contention.

=== Sikh Empire ===
The Italians had a significant impact on the Sikh Empire under Maharaja Ranjit Singh. They played key roles in the administration, military, and cultural aspects of the empire. Some notable Italians who influenced the Sikh Empire were General Jean-Baptiste Ventura and General Paolo Crescenzo Avitabile.

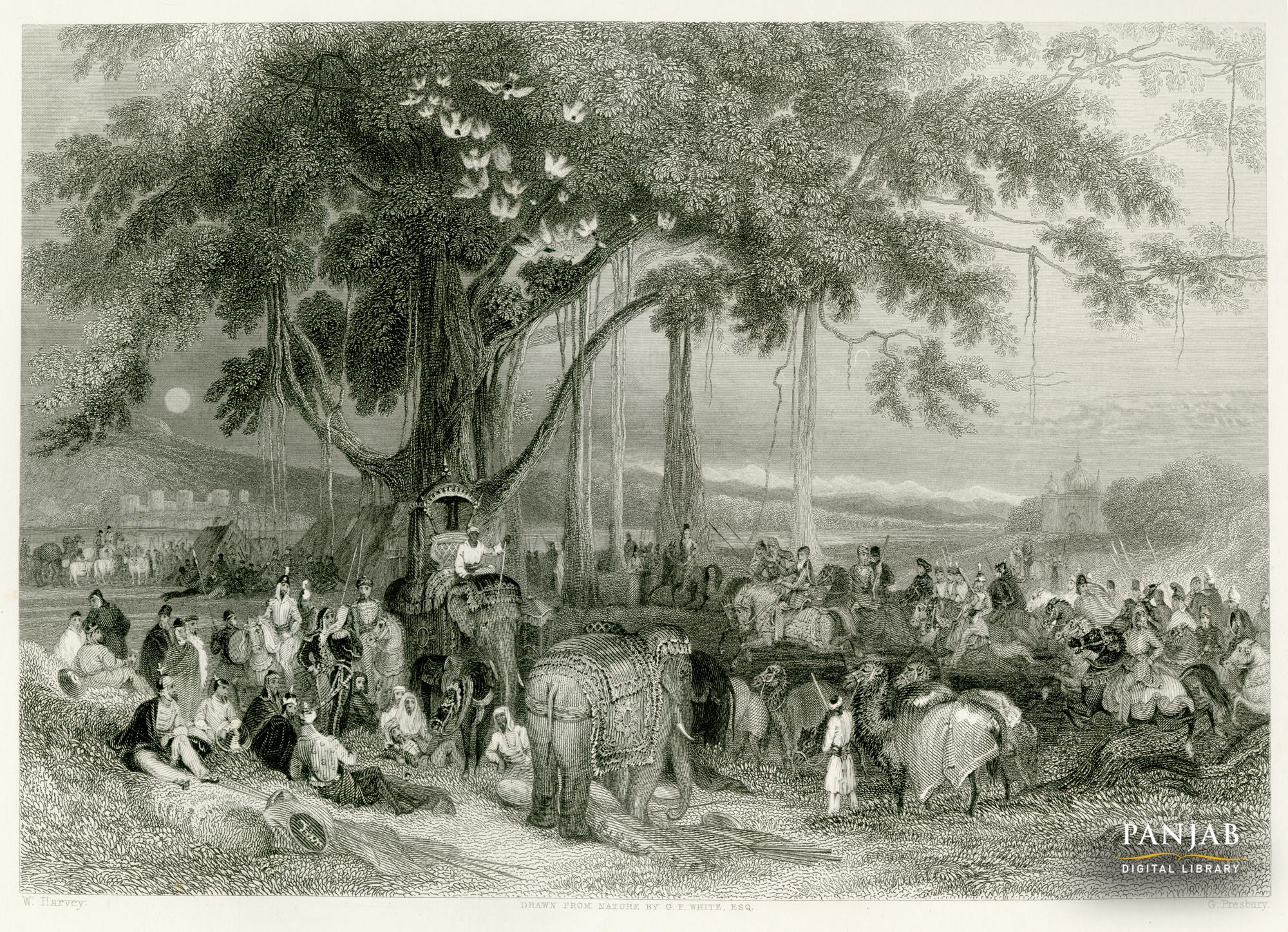
A late night gathering of Sikhs with Maharaja Ranjit Singh and Italian General Ventura outside the walls of Lahore, ca.1830

Ventura was a commander in the Fauj-i-Khas, a brigade of the Fauj-i-Ain section of the Sikh Khalsa Army of Punjab.

The Italians, along with other European mercenaries, were instrumental in modernizing and reorganizing the Khalsa Army, bringing it up to European standards. They introduced new military strategies, training techniques, and weaponry, enhancing the efficiency and effectiveness of the Sikh forces.

In addition to their military contributions, the Italians also held influential positions within the Sikh administration. They served as advisors to the Maharaja and held administrative posts in various provinces. For example, General Paolo Crescenzo Avitabile was appointed as the Governor of Wazirabad and succeeded Sikh leader General Hari Singh Nalwa as Governor of Peshawar where he implemented administrative reforms and maintained order in those regions.

The Italians also had a cultural impact on the Sikh Empire. They brought their own customs, traditions, and architectural styles, influencing the artistic and architectural landscape of Punjab. Their presence contributed to the cosmopolitan atmosphere at the Lahore Court and added to the modernising of the Sikh Army.

=== Mid 19th Century: Duleep Singh ===
Maharaja Duleep Singh had travelled through Italy in late 1856 and early 1857. Lena, Lady Login had a handwritten diary recounting parts of the four-month tour accompanying Duleep Singh on this trip.

=== Early 1900s ===
In 1918, Maharaja Bhupinder Singh of Patiala was awarded the Order of the Crown of Italy.

Maharaja Bhupinder Singh of Patiala visited Rome, Italy in 1935. To this day, it is claimed shops in Milan still remember Singh as one of their high-flying benefactors. As an ally of the British, Bhupinder Singh served on the General Staff in the World War I which commanded the first Patiala Regiment, which won 43 honours for its display of courage in Italy alongside Palestine, Gallipoli and Mesopotamia in the World War I.

=== Italian campaign (World War II) ===
The Italian Campaign began with the landing of the Allies in Sicily on July 9, 1943. This significant event marked Italy's decision to join the war on the side of the Allies and the beginning of the decline of Fascism. On April 24, 1945, the liberation of Ferrara was officially announced by Anglo-American troops. Testimonies from that time indicate that Indian troops, primarily Sikh soldiers, were among the first to reach Ferrara. These troops were part of the 5th Corps of the 8th British Army. Following the liberation of Ferrara, the troops were deployed in Porotto, strategically located on the path leading to the Po River, which ran alongside the Gothic Line.

Maharaja Yadavindra Singh also fought in Italy during the World War II.

In April 2023, the World Sikh Martyr Military Memorial Committee (WMC) attended the commemoration ceremony in Lucera, Italy. It is estimated that between 5,000 - 5,800 Sikh Soldiers died for the liberation of Italy.

During the Italian Campaign, Indian troops won six of the 20 Victoria crosses awarded to Allied Forces in Italy.

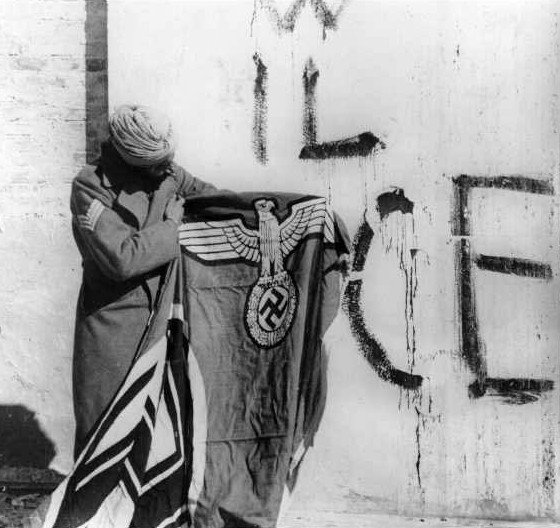
A Sikh soldier of the 4th Division (the Red Eagles) of the Indian Army, attached to the British Fifth Army in Italy. Holding a captured Hakenkreuz (Hooked Cross) after the surrender of German forces in Italy, May 1945.

=== Italian Sikh Soldier Memorial ===
In April 2011, at the Forli War Cemetery, the inauguration of the first Sikh military monument in Italy was dedicated to the Sikhs who fought in Forlì from 1943 to 1945. According to the Commonwealth War Graves Commission, it is estimated that 352 Sikh soldiers died at Forli.

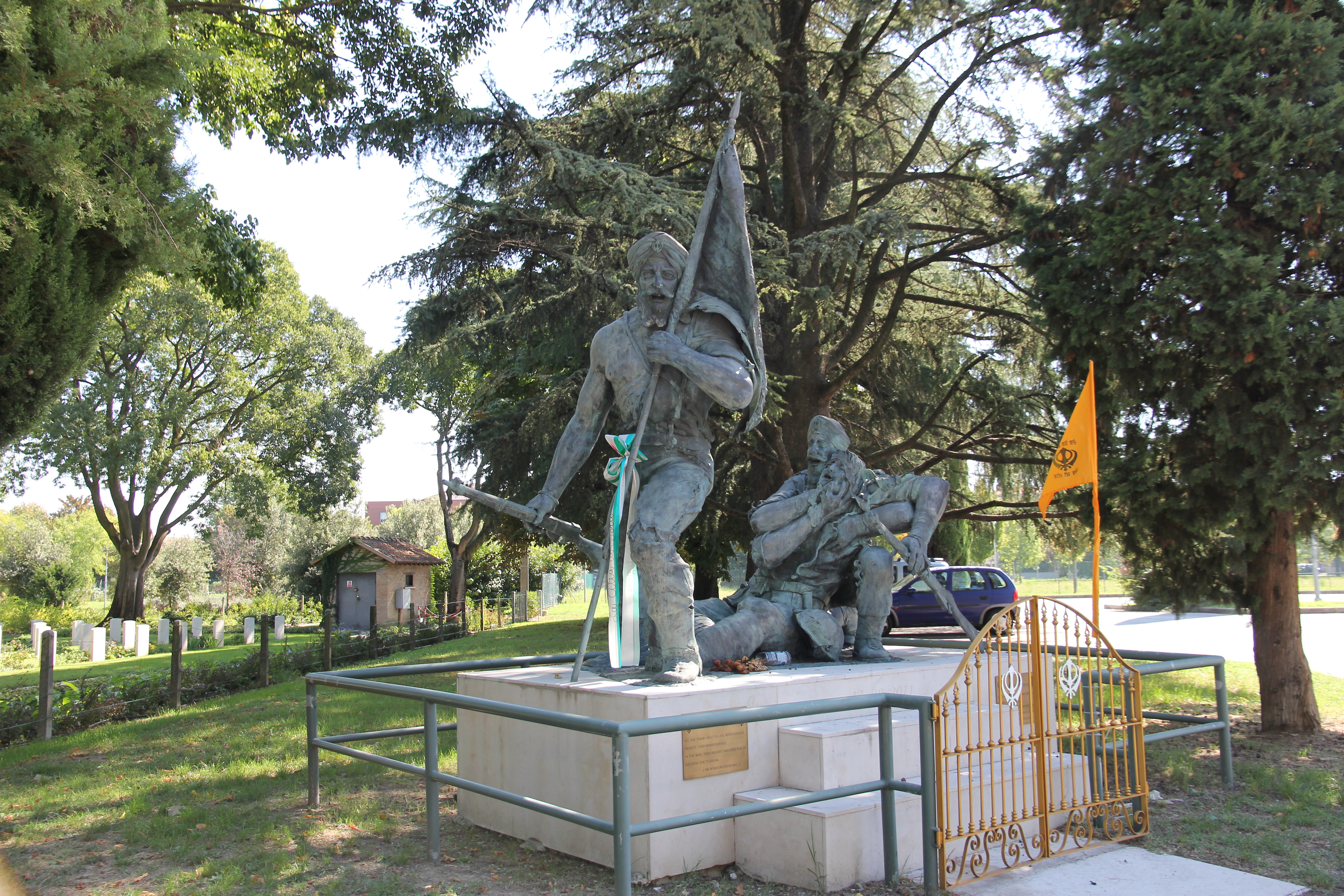
WWII Sikh Soldier Statue at Forli War Cemetery in Forlì, Italy

=== Post World War II ===
In 1965, Maharaja Yadavindra Singh served as the ambassador to Italy for two years before leaving his post to become a member of the Punjab State Assembly.

In 1968, Milkha Singh finished fourth in the men's 400m in the Olympic Games in Rome.

In 1991, the first Gurdwara was opened in an abandoned flour mill in Rio Saliceto, Reggio Emilia. Here, worship occurred on Sundays.

=== 21st Century ===
In 2009, Dr. Manmohan Singh, the First Sikh Prime Minister of India arrives in Rome, Italy to attend the 35th G8 summit.

In April 2023, Vincenzo De Luca, Italian Ambassador to India went to pay obeisance at Golden Temple in Amritsar, India.

== Employment ==
=== Italian cheese industry ===
There is a disproportionate amount of Sikhs working in the Italian cheese industry. Due to their significant contribution to the industry, Sikhs have been regarded as the 'saviours of Parmesan'.

The British Sikh Report has stated in 2016, "As a result, Sikhs make up a large number of workers in many of the Mozzarella and Parmesan dairies in Northern and Central Italy. It is remarkable to think that a significant portion of these and other world famous Italian cheeses are now produced by Sikhs. The influx of diligent Sikh migrant workers has rescued the trade as many younger Italians have sought vocations away from these traditional industries."

=== Exploitation of Sikh workers ===
There have been thousands of cases raised of exploitation of Sikh migrant workers within the agricultural sector. Many have been exploited through being paid below minimum wage, organised crime, blackmail, harassment, threats and even violence.

Marco Omizzolo, is a sociologist, researcher and journalist who has been documenting human rights violations against Sikh migrant workers exploited in the fields in the province of Latina. He has released various books, research papers and studies in this area.

In 2011, Al Jazeera released a documentary called 'Italy's Sikh Slaves' which explored Sikh migrant workers who "face abuse and exploitation from both profit-driven agri-businesses and organised crime – labouring for pitiful wages, often without official documentation, and trapped in a system from which there is no escape."

According to Medu (Doctors for Human Rights - Italy), 43% of Sikh agricultural workers don't speak Italian therefore are cut-off from criminal justice and social support services.

Sikh women have also reported sexual exploitation, harassment and work exploitation. The Lilith Women's Center in Latina, Lazio also has stated the threat of domestic violence is also a deterrent to Punjabi women seeking justice when they facing harassment.

In 2016, Marco Omizzolo and 4,000 Sikhs marched through the provincial capital of Latina to protest pay and conditions.

In 2018, another protest was organised where representatives from Italy's largest workers' unions joined 1,500 Sikhs.

United Nations's special rapporteur on contemporary forms of slavery had estimated that more than 400,000 agricultural workers in Italy are at risk being exploitation in 2018 and almost 100,000 are likely to face "inhumane conditions".

== Demographics ==
It is widely estimated that the number of Sikhs currently are between 200,000 to 220,000, with some scholars estimate this number to be significantly higher and have doubled it or even tripled it. This can be largely attributed due to ongoing large immigration from Punjab, undocumented migrants and a lack of religious census data in Italy.

- In 2006, Outlook (India) reported there to be 50,000 Sikhs in Italy.
- In 2012, Ester Gallo in his chapter 'Gurdwaras, Narrating Histories: Perspectives on the Sikh Diaspora in Italy estimated the number of Sikhs to be 115,000.
- In 2013, Barbara Bertolani in 'Globalizing Beliefs: Localizing Gods' estimated the number of Sikhs to be 100,000.
- In 2016, The Times of India estimated the number of Sikhs to be 124,000.
- In 2017 and 2018, The Hindustan Times estimated the number of Sikhs to be 150,000 to 200,000.
- In 2017, Corriere della Sera conducted an investigation and estimated the number of Sikhs to be 150,000.
- In 2017, The Wire (India) estimated the number of Sikhs to be closer to 220,000.
- In 2018, The Economic Times estimated the number of Sikhs to be closer to 200,000.
- In 2022, The Express Tribune, Geo News, Daily Pakistan, Pakistan Today, The Nation (Pakistan) and BOL Network estimated the number to be 200,000.
- In 2023, The Guardian estimated the number of Sikhs to be 220,000.
  Sikh Population in Italy (Estimate)
  Year	Pop.	±%
  2006	50,000	—
  2012	115,000	+130.0%
  2017	150,000	+30.4%
  2023	220,000	+46.7%

=== Regional ===
- It is estimated in Vicenza, there are 1,000.
- In Novellara, there are estimated to be 10,000 Sikhs.
- In Pontinia, there estimated to be 60,000 Sikhs making it the second largest cluster of Sikhs in Italy.

== Kirpan ruling ==
In 2017, Shiromani Gurdwara Parbandhak Committee (SGPC) decided to approach the International Court of Justice to challenge the recent ruling by the Italian court upholding the prohibition on Sikhs carrying the Kirpan. The SGPC expressed its discontent with the decision and plans to take legal action at the international level to defend the rights of Sikhs to carry their religious ceremonial daggers.

== Gurdwaras ==
There are about 60 Gurdwaras across the country—the oldest one being in Reggio Emilia in northern Italy where many members of the community are engaged in agricultural work.

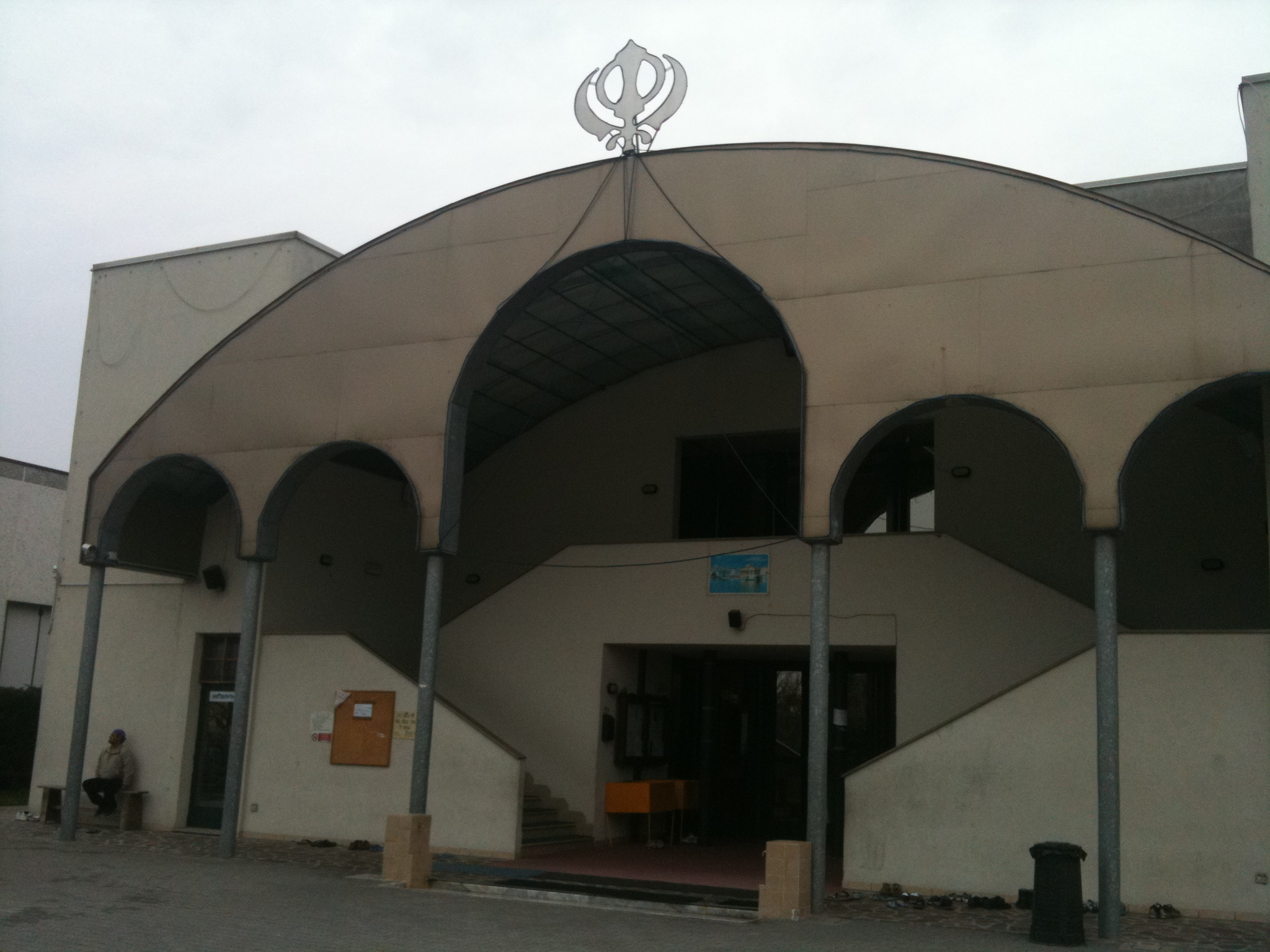
Gurdwara Singh Sabha in Reggio Emilia, Italy

These Gurdwaras include:

Calabria

- Gurdwara Sri Sadh Sangat Sahib, Locri
- Gurdwara Sri Sadh Sangat Sahib, Reggio Calabria

Friuli-Venezia Giulia

- Gurudwara Shri Singh Sabha, Pasiano di Pordenone

Emilia-Romagna

- Gurdwara Singh Sabha, Novellara
- Gurdwara Guru Nanak Darbar, Castelfranco Emilia
- Gurudwara Sahib, Correggio, Emilia-Romagna
- Gurdwara Shri Guru Nanak Parkash, Fiorenzuola d'Arda
- Gurudwara Dashmesh Darbar, Casalecchio di Reno
- Gurdwara Singh Sabha, Parma

Lazio

- Gurudwara Shri Guru Nanak Darvar, Roma
- Gurdwara Singh Sabha, Roma
- Gurdwara Sri Sadh Sangat Sahib, Terracina (LT)
- Gurdwara Singh Sabha, Fondi (LT)
- Gurudwara Singh Saba, Sabaudia (LT)
- Gurudwara Sing Sabha, Cisterna di Latina (LT)

Lombardia

- Gurudwara Singh Sabha, Cortenuova (BG)
- Gurudwara Sahib Baba Makhan Shah Lobana, Borgo San Giacomo (BS)
- Gurudwara Shri Guru Kalgidhar Singh Sabha, Torre De' Picenardi (CR)
- Gurudwara Shri Guru Nanak Niwas, Luzzana (BG)
- Gurduwara Shri Guru Hargobind Sahib Ji, Leno (BS)
- Gurdwara Mata Sahib Kaur ki, Covo (BG)
- Gurdwara Singh Sabha, Rodigo (MN)
- Shri Guru Ravidass Dham, Gorlago (BG)
- Gurudwara Shri Guru Kalgidhar Singh Sabha, Castiglione delle Stiviere (MN)
- Gurdwara Singh Sabha, Brescia (BS)

Marche

- Gurudwara singh sabha, Fabriano (AN)

Piemonte

- Gurudwara Singh Sabha, Novara
- Gurdwara Mata Sahib Kaur Ji, Nibbia, San Pietro Mosezzo, (NO)
- Gurdwara Singh Sabha Marene, Marene (CN)
- Gurudwara Mata Sahib Kaur Ji, Trecate (NO)

Puglia

- Gurudwara Singh Sabha, Bari
- Gurudwara Singh Sabha, Lecce

Toscana

- Gurdwara Sangat Sabha Terranuova Bracciolini (AR)

Trentino-Alto Adige

- Gurdwara Singh Sabha Galvani, Bolzano

Umbria

- Gurdwara Singh Sabh, Terni

Veneto

- Gurudwara Singh Sabha, Castelgomberto (VI)
- Baba Zorawar Singh Ji Baba Fateh Singh Ji Sewa Society, Lonigo (VI)
- Gurdwara Guru Nanak Mission Sewa Society, San Bonifacio (VR)
- Gurdwara Sri Sadh Sangat Sahib, Ormelle (TV)

== List of Italian Sikhs ==
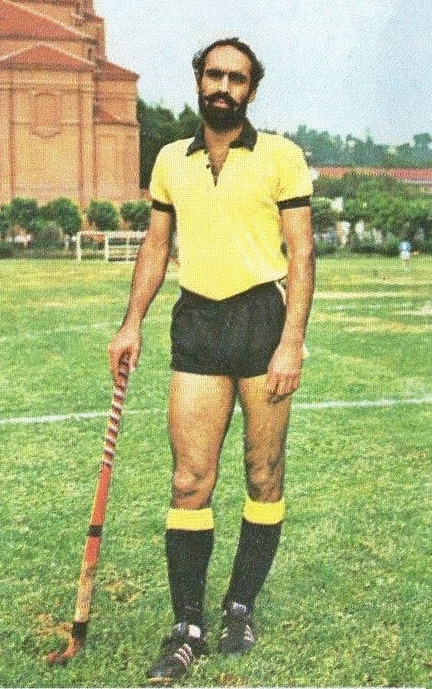
Inder Singh (Hockey) - 1968 Olympic Bronze Medallist

- Inder Singh - 1968 Indian Field Hockey Olympic bronze medallist, settled in Italy after marriage.
- Jasbeer Singh - Italian Field Hockey Player for Italy Women's National Field Hockey Team
- Kulwant Singh - 1972 Indian Field Hockey bronze medallist settled in Italy.
- Baljit Singh - Cricketer for Italian National Team.
- Manpreet Singh - Cricketer for Italian National Team.
- Jaspreet Singh - Cricketer for Italian National Team.
- Charanjeet Singh - Cricketer for Italian National Team

== See also ==
- Sikhism by country
- Religion in Italy
- Sikhism in France
- Sikhism in Germany
- Sikhism in Australia
- Sikhism in the United Kingdom
- Sikhism in New Zealand
- Sikhism in Canada
- Sikhism in the United States
