= Tamils in Italy =

Ethnic Group residing in Italy

Total population
- 25,000

Regions with significant populations
- Milan, Palermo, Rome

Languages
- Tamil, Italian, English

Religion
- Hinduism (~95%), Catholicism (~5%)

Tamils in Italy are people of ethnic Tamil ancestry who reside in Italy. Recent estimates indicate that around 25,000 Tamils from both Sri Lanka and India are living in Italy.

== History of Migration ==
Though it is not established when the migration of Tamil people to Italy started, Tamils were reported to have migrated to Milan during the 1980s. More migrants came during the Sri Lankan Civil War, which commenced in 1983. It is estimated that Sri Lankan Tamils constitute at least a third of the Sri Lankan immigrants in Italy.

The Tamil Diaspora is concentrated predominantly in Palermo, Catania, Milan, Reggio Emilia, Naples, Bologna and Lecce, where a number of cultural and linguistic organizations are based.
